= 2024–25 Drake Bulldogs women's basketball team =

American college basketball season

2024–25 Drake Bulldogs women's basketball

WBIT, First Round
- Conference: Missouri Valley Conference
- Record: 22–12 (15–5 MVC)
- Head coach: Allison Pohlman (4th season)
- Assistant coaches: Whitney Moia; Kelli Greenway; Cortni Rush
- Home arena: Knapp Center

2024–25 Missouri Valley Conference women's basketball standings
	Conf.				Overall
Team	W		L	PCT	W		L	PCT
Murray State †	16	–	4	.800	25	–	8	.758
Missouri State	16	–	4	.800	26	–	9	.743
Belmont	15	–	5	.750	26	–	13	.667
Drake	15	–	5	.750	22	–	12	.647
Illinois State	14	–	6	.700	24	–	13	.649
Northern Iowa	11	–	9	.550	17	–	17	.500
UIC	10	–	10	.500	15	–	18	.455
Valparaiso	9	–	11	.450	13	–	19	.406
Bradley	7	–	13	.350	14	–	19	.424
Evansville	3	–	17	.150	7	–	25	.219
Southern Illinois	2	–	18	.100	4	–	26	.133
Indiana State	2	–	18	.100	4	–	28	.125
† 2025 MVC tournament winner

The 2024–25 Drake Bulldogs women's basketball team represented Drake University during the 2024–25 NCAA Division I women's basketball season. The Bulldogs, led by fourth-year head coach Allison Pohlman, played their home games at the Knapp Center in Des Moines, Iowa as members of the Missouri Valley Conference (MVC).

== Previous season ==
The Bulldogs finished the 2023–24 season 29–6, 19–1 in MVC play, to finish in first place. In the MVC tournament, they defeated Indiana State in the quarterfinals, Northern Iowa in the semifinals, and Missouri State to win the MVC tournament championship and earn the conference's automatic bid into the NCAA tournament. They received the #12 seed in the Albany Regional 2, where they would lose to #5 region seed Colorado in the first round.

== Roster ==
2024–25 Drake Bulldogs women's basketball team
Players
Coaches

Pos.	#	Name	Height	Year	Previous school	Hometown
G	2	Grace Knutson	5 ft 10 in (1.78 m)	Fr	Cedar Falls	Cedar Falls, IA
G	3	Abbie Aalsma	5 ft 9 in (1.75 m)	Jr	Illinois State	Waupun, WI
G	4	Shannon Fornshell	6 ft 1 in (1.85 m)	So	Wayzata	Plymouth, MN
G	10	Katie Dinnebier	5 ft 8 in (1.73 m)	Sr	Waukee	West Des Moines, IA
G	11	Peyton McCabe	5 ft 7 in (1.7 m)	Fr	Skutt Catholic	Blair, NE
F	12	Ashley Iiams	6 ft 1 in (1.85 m)	Sr	Ames	Ames, IA
F	14	Anna Miller	6 ft 3 in (1.91 m)	Sr	Rochester Mayo	Rochester, MN
F	15	Maggie Taylor	6 ft 2 in (1.88 m)	Fr	Hill City	Rapid City, SD
G	20	Emily Christenson	5 ft 11 in (1.8 m)	So	East Ridge	Woodbury, MN
G	21	Ava Hawthorne	5 ft 9 in (1.75 m)	Jr	Gilbert	Ames, IA
G	22	Brooklin Dailey	6 ft 0 in (1.83 m)	So	Southeast Polk	Pleasant Hill, IA
F	30	Taedyn Gray	6 ft 2 in (1.88 m)	Jr	Shawnee Mission West	Lenexa, KS
F	32	Courtney Becker	6 ft 0 in (1.83 m)	GS	La Crosse Aquinas	Fountain City, WI

Head coach

- Allison Pohlman (Northern Iowa)

Assistant coach(es)

- Cortni Rush (Drake)
- Whitney Moia (MidAmerica Nazarene)
- Kelli Greenway (Iowa)

Legend

- (C) Team captain
- (S) Suspended
- (I) Ineligible
- (W) Walk-on
- Injured
- Current redshirt

Roster
Last update: December 16, 2024

== Schedule and results ==
Date time, TV	Rank^{#}	Opponent^{#}	Result	Record	High points	High rebounds	High assists	Site (attendance) city, state
Exhibition
October 27, 2024*; 2:00 p.m.		Omaha	W 96–79	–	14 – Iiams	8 – Becker	7 – Knutson	Knapp Center (2,106); Des Moines, IA
October 31, 2024*; 6:00 p.m.		Grand View	W 110–46	–	15 – 2 tied	7 – Becker	9 – Hawthorne	Knapp Center (1,942); Des Moines, IA
Non-conference regular season
November 4, 2024*; 11:00 a.m.		at North Dakota State	W 84–78	1–0	22 – Miller	13 – Miller	6 – Dinnebier	Scheels Center (1,073); Fargo, ND
November 7, 2024*; 6:00 p.m., ESPN+		Saint Louis	W 95–70	2–0	24 – Miller	9 – Miller	9 – Dinnebier	Knapp Center (2,173); Des Moines, IA
November 11, 2024*; 6:00 p.m., FloHoops		at Creighton	L 72–80	2–1	21 – Becker	14 – Miller	4 – Becker	D. J. Sokol Arena (1,609); Omaha, NE
November 17, 2024*; 2:00 p.m., MC22/ESPN+		Iowa	L 73–86	2-2	40 – Dinnebier	10 – Miller	5 – Dinnebier	Knapp Center (6,424); Des Moines, IA
November 24, 2024*; 2:00 p.m., ESPN+		at No. 8 Iowa State	L 78–80	2–3	39 – Dinnebier	8 – Miller	4 – Miller	Hilton Coliseum (10,368); Ames, IA
November 28, 2024*; 12:30 p.m., FloSports		vs. Wyoming; San Juan Shootout	L 57–71	2–4	11 – Dailey	8 – Taylor	6 – Dinnebier	Roberto Clemente Coliseum (250); San Juan, PR
November 29, 2024*; 10:00 a.m., FloSports		vs. Green Bay; San Juan Shootout	L 59–64	2–5	16 – Miller	12 – Becker	9 – Dinnebier	Roberto Clemente Coliseum (250); San Juan, PR
November 30, 2024*; 2:00 p.m., FloSports		vs. Washington State; San Juan Shootout	W 79–68	3–5	19 – Aalsma	12 – Becker	13 – Dinnebier	Roberto Clemente Coliseum (250); San Juan, PR
December 12, 2024*; 5:00 p.m., MC22/ESPN+		North Dakota	W 82–63	4–5	18 – Hawthorne	13 – Becker	13 – Dinnebier	Knapp Center (4,919); Des Moines, IA
December 16, 2024*; 11:00 a.m., ESPN+		USC Upstate	W 84–34	5–5	11 – Dailey	11 – Taylor	4 – Miller	Knapp Center (6,424); Des Moines, IA
December 21, 2024*; 1:00 p.m., MidcoSN		at St. Thomas (MN)	W 92–81	6–5	32 – Dinnebier	10 – Miller	10 – Dinnebier	Schoenecker Arena (653); Saint Paul, MN
MVC regular season
December 29, 2024; 12:00 p.m., ESPN+		at Evansville	W 76–54	7–5 (1–0)	32 – Dinnebier	12 – Miller	8 – Dinnebier	Ford Center (807); Evansville, IN
January 2, 2025; 6:00 p.m., ESPN+		UIC	W 86–63	8–5 (2–0)	26 – Becker	7 – Miller	9 – Dinnebier	Knapp Center (2,316); Des Moines, IA
January 4, 2025; 2:00 p.m., ESPN+		Valparaiso	W 82–64	9–5 (3–0)	31 – Dinnebier	9 – Miller	4 – Dinnebier	Knapp Center (2,656); Des Moines, IA
January 10, 2025; 6:00 p.m., ESPN+		at Bradley	W 67-63	10-5 (4-0)	26 – Dinnebier	11 – Becker	7 – Dinnebier	Renaissance Coliseum (510); Peoria, IL
January 12, 2025; 2:00 p.m., ESPN+		at Illinois State	W 85-64	11-5 (5-0)	18 – Dinnebier	12 – Becker	12 – Dinnebier	CEFCU Arena (2,519); Normal, IL
January 16, 2025; 6:00 p.m., ESPN+		Belmont	L 65-80	11-6 (5-1)	21 – Dinnebier	7 – Dinnebier	7 – Dinnebier	Knapp Center (2,874); Des Moines, IA
January 18, 2025; 2:00 p.m., ESPN+		Murray State	L 59-81	11-7 (5-2)	16 – Dinnebier	7 – Miller	7 – Dinnebier	Knapp Center (2,739); Des Moines, IA
January 25, 2025; 6:30 p.m., ESPN+		at Missouri State	L 68-72 ^{OT}	11-8 (5-3)	28 – Dinnebier	18 – Miller	6 – Dinnebier	Great Southern Bank Arena (3,115); Springfield, MO
January 26, 2025; 2:00 p.m., ESPN+		at Southern Illinois	W 93-66	12-8 (6-3)	20 – Aalsma	8 – Taylor	8 – Dinnebier	Banterra Center (377); Carbondale, IL
February 1, 2025; 2:00 p.m., ESPN+		Northern Iowa	W 69-63	13-8 (7-3)	20 – Miller	13 – Miller	5 – Dinnebier	Knapp Center (4,355); Des Moines, IA
February 7, 2025; 6:00 p.m., ESPN+		Illinois State	W 79-74	14-8 (8-3)	19 – Dinnebier	13 – Miller	11 – Dinnebier	Knapp Center (2,547); Des Moines, IA
February 9, 2025; 2:00 p.m., ESPN+		Bradley	W 72-52	15-8 (9-3)	15 – Dinnebier	8 – Miller	10 – Dinnebier	Knapp Center (2,159); Des Moines, IA
February 13, 2025; 6:00 p.m., ESPN+		at Murray State	W 92-86	16-8 (10-3)	21 – Dinnebier	11 – Miller	7 – Dinnebier	CFSB Center (1,811); Murray, KY
February 15, 2025; 4:00 p.m., ESPN+		at Belmont	W 88-83	17-8 (11-3)	42 – Dinnebier	10 – Becker	8 – Dinnebier	Curb Event Center (936); Nashville, TN
February 20, 2025; 6:00 p.m., ESPN+		Southern Illinois	W 82-40	18-8 (12-3)	18 – Dinnebier	12 – Becker	7 – Becker	Knapp Center (2,421); Des Moines, IA
February 22, 2025; 2:00 p.m., ESPN+		Missouri State	L 79-82 ^{OT}	18-9 (12-4)	33 – Dinnebier	9 – Becker	8 – Dinnebier	Knapp Center (2,933); Des Moines, IA
February 27, 2025; 6:00 p.m., ESPN+		Indiana State	W 107-86	19-9 (13-4)	35 – Dinnebier	11 – Taylor	10 – Dinnebier	Knapp Center (2,492); Des Moines, IA
March 1, 2025; 2:00 p.m., ESPN+		at Northern Iowa	W 80-79	20-9 (14-4)	36 – Dinnebier	11 – Miller	7 – Dinnebier	McLeod Center (3,370); Cedar Falls, IA
March 6, 2025; 6:00 p.m., ESPN+		at Valparaiso	L 65-66	20-10 (14-5)	30 – Dinnebier	12 – Becker	4 – Dinnebier	Athletics-Recreation Center (290); Valparaiso, IN
March 8, 2025; 2:00 p.m., ESPN+		at UIC	W 69-49	21-10 (15-5)	32 – Dinnebier	8 – Miller	9 – Dinnebier	Credit Union 1 Arena (758); Chicago, IL
MVC tournament
March 14, 2025; 2:30 p.m., ESPN+	(4)	vs. (5) Illinois State; Quarterfinals	W 75-69	22-10	22 – Dinnebier	10 – Miller	4 – Dinnebier	Ford Center (947); Evansville, IN
March 15, 2025; 1:30 p.m., ESPN+	(4)	vs. (1) Murray State; Semifinals	L 90-96	22-11	45 – Dinnebier	9 – Becker	5 – Dinnebier	Ford Center (1,000); Evansville, IN
WBIT
March 20, 2025*; 2:00 p.m., ESPN+	(4)	Marquette; First Round	L 69-74	22-12	25 – Dinnebier	11 – Miller	5 – Dinnebier	Knapp Center (1,959); Des Moines, IA
*Non-conference game. ^{#}Rankings from AP poll. (#) Tournament seedings in parentheses. All times are in Central.
