= 2024–25 Northern Iowa Panthers women's basketball team =

American college basketball season

2024–25 Northern Iowa Panthers women's basketball

WBIT, first round
- Conference: Missouri Valley Conference
- Record: 17–17 (11–9 MVC)
- Head coach: Tanya Warren (18th season)
- Associate head coach: Brad Nelson
- Assistant coaches: Nate Oakland; Katelin Vandevender; Deidra Johnson
- Home arena: McLeod Center

2024–25 Missouri Valley Conference women's basketball standings
	Conf.				Overall
Team	W		L	PCT	W		L	PCT
Murray State †	16	–	4	.800	25	–	8	.758
Missouri State	16	–	4	.800	26	–	9	.743
Belmont	15	–	5	.750	26	–	13	.667
Drake	15	–	5	.750	22	–	12	.647
Illinois State	14	–	6	.700	24	–	13	.649
Northern Iowa	11	–	9	.550	17	–	17	.500
UIC	10	–	10	.500	15	–	18	.455
Valparaiso	9	–	11	.450	13	–	19	.406
Bradley	7	–	13	.350	14	–	19	.424
Evansville	3	–	17	.150	7	–	25	.219
Southern Illinois	2	–	18	.100	4	–	26	.133
Indiana State	2	–	18	.100	4	–	28	.125
† 2025 MVC tournament winner

The 2024–25 Northern Iowa Panthers women's basketball team represented the University of Northern Iowa during the 2024–25 NCAA Division I women's basketball season. The Panthers, led by 18th-year head coach Tanya Warren, played their home games at the McLeod Center in Cedar Falls, Iowa as members of the Missouri Valley Conference (MVC).

The Panthers finished the season 17–17, 11–9 in MVC play, to finish in sixth place.

== Previous season ==
The Panthers finished the 2022–23 season 23–10, 16–4 in MVC play, to finish in fourth place. In the MVC tournament, they defeated Illinois State in the quarterfinals before falling to top-seeded Drake in the semifinals. They received an invitation to the WNIT, where they fell at Saint Louis.

== Roster ==
2024–25 Northern Iowa Panthers women's basketball team
Players
Coaches

Pos.	#	Name	Height	Year	Previous school	Hometown
G	0	Maya McDermott	5 ft 6 in (1.68 m)	Sr	Johnston High School	Johnston, IA
F	2	Kaylee Corbin	6 ft 1 in (1.85 m)	Jr	Louisa-Muscatine High School	Letts, IA
G	3	Ellie Foster	5 ft 11 in (1.8 m)	RS Jr	Green Bay	Dike, IA
G	4	Emerson Green	5 ft 10 in (1.78 m)	Sr	Cedar Falls High School	Cedar Falls, IA
F	5	Ryley Goebel	5 ft 11 in (1.8 m)	Jr	Center Point–Urbana High School	Urbana, IA
G	11	Mya Nicholson	5 ft 9 in (1.75 m)	Fr	Janesville-Craig High School	Milton, WI
F	13	Shateah Wetering	6 ft 0 in (1.83 m)	RS Sr	Iowa	Montezuma, IA
F	15	Elise Jaeger	6 ft 1 in (1.85 m)	Fr	Valley High School	West Des Moines, IA
G	21	Eliana Sheplee	5 ft 10 in (1.78 m)	Fr	Rice Lake High School	Birchwood, WI
G	22	Taryn Wharton	5 ft 5 in (1.65 m)	Jr	Bellevue West High School	Bellevue, NE
G	23	Bri Robinson	5 ft 8 in (1.73 m)	So	Lincoln High School	Lincoln, NE
G	24	Kayba Laube	5 ft 9 in (1.75 m)	Jr	Marion High School	Marion, IA
F	34	Kaylynn Janes	6 ft 0 in (1.83 m)	Fr	Incarnate Word Academy	St. Louis, MO
F	42	Grace Boffeli	6 ft 1 in (1.85 m)	Sr	North Scott High School	Eldridge, IA

Head coach

- Tanya Warren (Creighton)

Assistant coach(es)

- Brad Nelson (Oregon)
- Nate Oakland (Northern Iowa)
- Katelin Vandevender (Northern Iowa)
- Deidra Johnson (Oklahoma State)

Legend

- (C) Team captain
- (S) Suspended
- (I) Ineligible
- (W) Walk-on
- Injured
- Current redshirt

Roster
Last update: May 10, 2025

== Schedule and results ==
Date time, TV	Rank^{#}	Opponent^{#}	Result	Record	Site (attendance) city, state
Exhibition
October 29, 2024*; 6:00 p.m.		Quincy	W 92–58	–	McLeod Center (865); Cedar Falls, IA
Non-conference regular season
November 5, 2024*; 6:00 p.m., ESPN+		Wisconsin–La Crosse	W 99–56	1–0	McLeod Center (2,227); Cedar Falls, IA
November 9, 2024*; 1:00 p.m., ESPN+		at Green Bay	W 71–56	2–0	Kress Events Center (1,884); Green Bay, WI
November 16, 2024*; 2:00 p.m., ESPN+		Ball State	L 70–76	2–1	McLeod Center (2,338); Cedar Falls, IA
November 20, 2024*; 6:00 p.m., ESPN+		No. 8 Iowa State	W 87–75	3–1	McLeod Center (5,304); Cedar Falls, IA
November 28, 2024*; 2:00 p.m., ESPN+		vs. Auburn; U.S. Virgin Islands Paradise Jam	L 64–65	3–2	Eldridge Blake Sports & Fitness Center (925); St. Thomas, U.S. Virgin Islands
November 29, 2024*; 2:00 p.m., ESPN+		vs. Kansas; U.S. Virgin Islands Paradise Jam	L 73–76	3–3	Eldridge Blake Sports & Fitness Center (625); St. Thomas, U.S. Virgin Islands
November 30, 2024*; 11:30 a.m., ESPN+		vs. Pittsburgh; U.S. Virgin Islands Paradise Jam	W 90–74	4–3	Eldridge Blake Sports & Fitness Center (–); St. Thomas, U.S. Virgin Islands
December 7, 2024*; 2:00 p.m., ESPN+		Creighton	L 71–75	4–4	McLeod Center (2,745); Cedar Falls, IA
December 10, 2024*; 6:00 p.m., ESPN+		South Dakota	W 78–59	5–4	McLeod Center (2,360); Cedar Falls, IA
December 14, 2024*; 4:00 p.m., ESPN+		at South Dakota State	L 53–68	5–5	First Bank and Trust Arena (2,156); Brookings, SD
December 20, 2024*; 6:30 p.m., BTN+		at No. 22 Iowa	L 86–92	5–6	Carver–Hawkeye Arena (14,998); Iowa City, IA
MVC regular season
December 29, 2024; 1:00 p.m., ESPN+		at Indiana State	W 75–65	6–6 (1–0)	Hulman Center (1,204); Terre Haute, IN
January 2, 2025; 6:00 p.m., ESPN+		Valparaiso	W 93–70	7–6 (2–0)	McLeod Center (2,607); Cedar Falls, IA
January 4, 2025; 2:00 p.m., ESPN+		UIC	W 75–64	8–6 (3–0)	McLeod Center (2,543); Cedar Falls, IA
January 10, 2025; 6:30 p.m., ESPN+		at Illinois State	L 66–79	8–7 (3–1)	CEFCU Arena (1,630); Normal, IL
January 12, 2025; 2:00 p.m., ESPN+		at Bradley	W 67–44	9–7 (4–1)	Renaissance Coliseum (652); Peoria, IL
January 16, 2025; 6:00 p.m., ESPN+		Murray State	L 89–95	9–8 (4–2)	McLeod Center (2,432); Cedar Falls, IA
January 18, 2025; 2:00 p.m., ESPN+		Belmont	L 60–74	9–9 (4–3)	McLeod Center (2,621); Cedar Falls, IA
January 24, 2025; 6:00 p.m., ESPN+		at Southern Illinois	W 84–59	10–9 (5–3)	Banterra Center (402); Carbondale, IL
January 26, 2025; 2:00 p.m., ESPN+		at Missouri State	L 45–81	10–10 (5–4)	Great Southern Bank Arena (2,241); Springfield, MO
February 1, 2025; 2:00 p.m., ESPN+		at Drake	L 63–69	10–11 (5–5)	Knapp Center (4,355); Des Moines, IA
February 7, 2025; 6:00 p.m., ESPN+		Bradley	W 69–51	11–11 (6–5)	McLeod Center (2,853); Cedar Falls, IA
February 9, 2025; 2:00 p.m., ESPN+		Illinois State	W 72–52	12–11 (7–5)	McLeod Center (2,489); Cedar Falls, IA
February 13, 2025; 6:00 p.m., ESPN+		at Belmont	W 73–61	13–11 (8–5)	Curb Event Center (729); Nashville, TN
February 15, 2025; 2:00 p.m., ESPN+		at Murray State	L 91–96	13–12 (8–6)	CFSB Center (1,651); Murray, KY
February 20, 2025; 6:00 p.m., ESPN+		Missouri State	L 72–75 ^{OT}	13–13 (8–7)	McLeod Center (2,638); Cedar Falls, IA
February 22, 2025; 2:00 p.m., ESPN+		Southern Illinois	W 87–51	14–13 (9–7)	McLeod Center (2,828); Cedar Falls, IA
February 27, 2025; 6:00 p.m., ESPN+		Evansville	W 71–54	15–13 (10–7)	McLeod Center (2,796); Cedar Falls, IA
March 1, 2025; 2:00 p.m., ESPN+		Drake	L 79–80	15–14 (10–8)	McLeod Center (3,370); Cedar Falls, IA
March 6, 2025; 7:00 p.m., ESPN+		at UIC	L 57–76	15–15 (10–9)	Credit Union 1 Arena (464); Chicago, IL
March 8, 2025; 1:00 p.m., ESPN+		at Valparaiso	W 85–73	16–15 (11–9)	Athletics-Recreation Center (421); Valparaiso, IN
MVC tournament
March 13, 2025; 8:30 p.m., ESPN+	(6)	vs. (11) Indiana State; Opening round	W 87–73	17–15	Ford Center (822); Evansville, IN
March 14, 2025; 8:30 p.m., ESPN+	(6)	vs. (3) Belmont; Quarterfinals	L 46–64	17–16	Ford Center (927); Evansville, IN
WBIT
March 20, 2025*; 6:00 p.m., ESPN+		at (3) Florida; First round	L 71–83	17–17	O'Connell Center (405); Gainesville, FL
*Non-conference game. ^{#}Rankings from AP poll. (#) Tournament seedings in parentheses. All times are in Central.
