= 2024–25 Illinois State Redbirds women's basketball team =

American college basketball season

2024–25 Illinois State Redbirds women's basketball

WNIT, Fab 4
- Conference: Missouri Valley Conference
- Record: 24–13 (14–6 MVC)
- Head coach: Kristen Gillespie (8th season)
- Associate head coach: Scott Gillespie
- Assistant coaches: Drew Cole; Katrina Beck; Jordan Alford; Mannie Robinson
- Home arena: CEFCU Arena

2024–25 Missouri Valley Conference women's basketball standings
	Conf.				Overall
Team	W		L	PCT	W		L	PCT
Murray State †	16	–	4	.800	25	–	8	.758
Missouri State	16	–	4	.800	26	–	9	.743
Belmont	15	–	5	.750	26	–	13	.667
Drake	15	–	5	.750	22	–	12	.647
Illinois State	14	–	6	.700	24	–	13	.649
Northern Iowa	11	–	9	.550	17	–	17	.500
UIC	10	–	10	.500	15	–	18	.455
Valparaiso	9	–	11	.450	13	–	19	.406
Bradley	7	–	13	.350	14	–	19	.424
Evansville	3	–	17	.150	7	–	25	.219
Southern Illinois	2	–	18	.100	4	–	26	.133
Indiana State	2	–	18	.100	4	–	28	.125
† 2025 MVC tournament winner

The 2024–25 Illinois State Redbirds women's basketball team represented Illinois State University during the 2024–25 NCAA Division I women's basketball season. The Redbirds, who were led by eighth-year head coach Kristen Gillespie, played their home games at CEFCU Arena in Normal, Illinois as members of the Missouri Valley Conference.

== Previous season ==
The Redbirds finished the 2023–24 season 21–11, 13–7 in MVC play, to finish in fifth place. They defeated Evansville, before falling to Northern Iowa in the quarterfinals of the MVC tournament. They received an at-large bid to the WNIT, where they would defeat Charleston in the second round, before falling to Wisconsin in the Super 16.

== Preseason ==
On October 1, 2024, the MVC released their preseason coaches poll. Illinois State was picked to finish seventh in the MVC regular season.

=== Preseason rankings ===
MVC preseason poll
Predicted finish	Team	Votes (1st place)
1	Drake	566 (39)
2	Northern Iowa	504 (6)
3	Belmont	475 (3)
4	Murray State	391
5	Missouri State	380
6	UIC	347
7	Illinois State	341
8	Valparaiso	193
9	Indiana State	189
10	Southern Illinois	167
11	Bradley	97
12	Evansville	96

=== Preseason All-MVC Teams ===
Preseason All-MVC Team
Team	Player	Position	Year
Second	Maya Wong	Guard	Graduate student

== Roster ==
2024–25 Illinois State Redbirds women's basketball team
Players
Coaches

Pos.	#	Name	Height	Year	Previous school	Hometown
G	0	Shannon Dowell	5 ft 10 in (1.78 m)	So	O'Fallon Township High School	O'Fallon, Illinois
G	1	Elyce Knudsen	5 ft 8 in (1.73 m)	GS	Millikin	Philo, Illinois
G/F	2	De'Shawnti Thomas	5 ft 10 in (1.78 m)	RS Jr	Old Dominion	Tulsa, Oklahoma
G	3	Trista Fayta	5 ft 8 in (1.73 m)	Fr	Notre Dame Academy	Green Bay, Wisconsin
G	4	Lauren Cohen	5 ft 8 in (1.73 m)	Sr	Glenbard South High School	Wheaton, Illinois
G	5	Morgan Bruno	5 ft 11 in (1.8 m)	Fr	Loyola Academy	Chicago, Illinois
G	11	Caroline Waite	5 ft 4 in (1.63 m)	Sr	Bradley	Ames, Iowa
G	12	Maya Wong	5 ft 8 in (1.73 m)	GS	Normal Community High School	Normal, Illinois
G	15	Taylor Veach	5 ft 11 in (1.8 m)	Jr	Central DeWitt High School	DeWitt, Iowa
F	21	Nevaeh Thomas	6 ft 1 in (1.85 m)	So	Evansville	Kenosha, Wisconsin
F	22	Doneelah Washington	6 ft 1 in (1.85 m)	Fr	Lincoln Northeast High School	Lincoln, Nebraska
G	23	Grace Nelson	5 ft 10 in (1.78 m)	Fr	Altamont High School	Altamont, Illinois
F	24	Addison Martin	6 ft 1 in (1.85 m)	RS Jr	Abilene Christian	Shreveport, Louisiana
F	52	Savannah McGowan	6 ft 2 in (1.88 m)	So	Armstrong High School	Plymouth, Minnesota

Head coach

- Kristen Gillespie (NC State)

Assistant coach(es)

- Scott Gillespie (Ripon)
- Drew Cole (Aurora)
- Katrina Beck (Illinois State)
- Jordan Alford (Columbia (MO))
- Mannie Robinson (Talladega)

Legend

- (C) Team captain
- (S) Suspended
- (I) Ineligible
- (W) Walk-on
- Injured
- Current redshirt

Roster
Last update: April 3, 2025

== Schedule and results ==
Date time, TV	Rank^{#}	Opponent^{#}	Result	Record	Site (attendance) city, state
Exhibition
October 27, 2024*; 2:00 pm		Illinois Wesleyan	W 101–86	–	CEFCU Arena; Normal, IL
Non-conference regular season
November 6, 2024*; 7:00 pm, B1G+		at Northwestern	W 81–77	1–0	Welsh–Ryan Arena (1,119); Evanston, IL
November 12, 2024*; 7:00 pm, ESPN+		at Saint Louis	L 71–78	1–1	Chaifetz Arena (857); St. Louis, MO
November 17, 2024*; 2:00 pm, ESPN+		Le Moyne	W 71–55	2–1	CEFCU Arena (3,974); Normal, IL
November 24, 2024*; 2:00 pm, ESPN+		Harvard	L 62–72	2–2	CEFCU Arena (1,424); Normal, IL
November 29, 2024*; 10:00 am, FloHoops		vs. Boise State; Gulf Coast Showcase first round	L 76–79	2–3	Hertz Arena (213); Estero, FL
November 30, 2024*; 10:00 am, FloHoops		vs. High Point; Gulf Coast Showcase consolation 2nd round	W 70–49	3–3	Hertz Arena (203); Estero, FL
December 1, 2024*; 12:30 pm, FloHoops		vs. New Mexico State; Gulf Coast Showcase 5th place game	W 82–66	4–3	Hertz Arena (177); Estero, FL
December 5, 2024*; 11:00 am, ESPN+		St. Francis (IL)	W 110–60	5–3	CEFCU Arena (8,027); Normal, IL
December 8, 2024*; 2:00 pm, FloHoops		at Marquette	L 57–78	5–4	Al McGuire Center (1,814); Milwaukee, WI
December 15, 2024*; 1:00 pm, NEC Front Row		at Chicago State	W 79–52	6–4	Jones Convocation Center (149); Chicago, IL
December 20, 2024*; 6:30 pm, ESPN+		UAB	L 68–71	6–5	CEFCU Arena (1,532); Normal, IL
MVC regular season
December 29, 2024; 2:00 pm, ESPN+		at Murray State	L 80–91	6–6 (0–1)	CFSB Center (1,478); Murray, KY
January 2, 2025; 6:30 pm, ESPN+		Indiana State	W 96–69	7–6 (1–1)	CEFCU Arena (1,596); Normal, IL
January 4, 2025; 4:00 pm, ESPN+		Evansville	W 79–55	8–6 (2–1)	CEFCU Arena (1,483); Normal, IL
January 10, 2025; 6:30 pm, ESPN+		Northern Iowa	W 79–66	9–6 (3–1)	CEFCU Arena (1,630); Normal, IL
January 12, 2025; 2:00 pm, ESPN+		Drake	L 64–85	9–7 (3–2)	CEFCU Arena (2,519); Normal, IL
January 17, 2025; 6:00 pm, ESPN+		at Valparaiso	W 79–65	10–7 (4–2)	Athletics–Recreation Center (242); Valparaiso, IN
January 19, 2025; 2:00 pm, ESPN+		at UIC	W 75–66	11–7 (5–2)	Credit Union 1 Arena (728); Chicago, IL
January 26, 2025; 2:00 pm, ESPN+		Bradley; I-74 Rivalry	W 74–58	12–7 (6–2)	CEFCU Arena (2,302); Normal, IL
January 31, 2025; 6:30 pm, ESPN+		Southern Illinois	W 78–60	13–7 (7–2)	CEFCU Arena (1,589); Normal, IL
February 2, 2025; 2:00 pm, ESPN+		Missouri State	W 66–55	14–7 (8–2)	CEFCU Arena (2,784); Normal, IL
February 7, 2025; 6:00 pm, ESPN+		at Drake	L 74–79	14–8 (8–3)	Knapp Center (2,547); Des Moines, IA
February 9, 2025; 2:00 pm, ESPN+		at Northern Iowa	L 52–72	14–9 (8–4)	McLeod Center (2,589); Cedar Falls, IA
February 13, 2025; 6:00 pm, ESPN+		at Indiana State	W 85–77	15–9 (9–4)	Hulman Center (1,110); Terre Haute, IN
February 15, 2025; 2:00 pm, ESPN+		at Evansville	W 73–53	16–9 (10–4)	Meeks Family Fieldhouse (318); Evansville, IN
February 20, 2025; 6:30 pm, ESPN+		Belmont	W 66–63	17–9 (11–4)	CEFCU Arena (2,489); Normal, IL
February 23, 2025; 2:00 pm, ESPN+		at Bradley; I-74 Rivalry	L 65–70	17–10 (11–5)	Renaissance Coliseum (951); Peoria, IL
February 27, 2025; 6:30 pm, ESPN+		UIC	W 65–64	18–10 (12–5)	CEFCU Arena (1,821); Normal, IL
March 1, 2025; 4:00 pm, ESPN+		Valparaiso	W 90–68	19–10 (13–5)	CEFCU Arena (2,621); Normal, IL
March 6, 2025; 6:30 pm, ESPN+		at Missouri State	L 47–72	19–11 (13–6)	Great Southern Bank Arena (2,415); Springfield, MO
March 8, 2025; 2:00 pm, ESPN+		at Southern Illinois	W 99–86	20–11 (14–6)	Banterra Center (324); Carbondale, IL
MVC tournament
March 13, 2025; 2:30 pm, ESPN+	(5)	vs. (12) Southern Illinois; Opening round	W 88–48	21–11	Ford Center (708); Evansville, IN
March 14, 2025; 2:30 pm, ESPN+	(5)	vs. (4) Drake; Quarterfinals	L 69–75	21–12	Ford Center (947); Evansville, IN
WNIT
March 23, 2025*; 2:00 pm, ESPN+		Western Illinois; Second round	W 90–80	22–12	CEFCU Arena (1,551); Normal, IL
March 27, 2025*; 6:30 pm, YouTube		Abilene Christian; Super 16	W 78–68	23–12	Shirk Center (1,380); Bloomington, IL
March 31, 2025*; 6:00 pm, ESPN+		Louisiana Tech; Great 8	W 78–70	24–12	CEFCU Arena (2,168); Normal, IL
April 2, 2025*; 6:30 pm, ESPN+		Troy; Fab 4	L 96–99	24–13	CEFCU Arena (2,406); Normal, IL
*Non-conference game. ^{#}Rankings from AP Poll. (#) Tournament seedings in parentheses. All times are in Central.
