= 2024–25 Murray State Racers women's basketball team =

American college basketball season

2024–25 Murray State Racers women's basketball

MVC regular season co-champions MVC tournament champions

NCAA tournament, First Round
- Conference: Missouri Valley Conference
- Record: 25–8 (16–4 MVC)
- Head coach: Rechelle Turner (8th season)
- Assistant coaches: Monica Evans; Wyatt Foust; Kayla Kleifgen; Brittney Patrick; Nieja Tucker
- Home arena: CFSB Center

2024–25 Missouri Valley Conference women's basketball standings
	Conf.				Overall
Team	W		L	PCT	W		L	PCT
Murray State †	16	–	4	.800	25	–	8	.758
Missouri State	16	–	4	.800	26	–	9	.743
Belmont	15	–	5	.750	26	–	13	.667
Drake	15	–	5	.750	22	–	12	.647
Illinois State	14	–	6	.700	24	–	13	.649
Northern Iowa	11	–	9	.550	17	–	17	.500
UIC	10	–	10	.500	15	–	18	.455
Valparaiso	9	–	11	.450	13	–	19	.406
Bradley	7	–	13	.350	14	–	19	.424
Evansville	3	–	17	.150	7	–	25	.219
Southern Illinois	2	–	18	.100	4	–	26	.133
Indiana State	2	–	18	.100	4	–	28	.125
† 2025 MVC tournament winner

The 2024–25 Murray State Racers women's basketball team represent Murray State University during the 2024–25 NCAA Division I women's basketball season. The Racers, led by eighth-year head coach Rechelle Turner, played their home games at the CFSB Center in Murray, Kentucky, as third-year members of the Missouri Valley Conference (MVC).

== Previous season ==
The Racers finished the 2023–24 season 20–12, 12–8 in MVC play, to finish in sixth place. They defeated Bradley, before falling to Missouri State in the quarterfinals of the MVC tournament. They received an at-large bid to the WNIT, where they were defeated by Southern Miss in the first round.

== Preseason ==
On October 1, 2024, the MVC released their preseason coaches poll. Murray State was picked to finish fourth in the MVC regular season.

=== Preseason rankings ===
MVC preseason poll
Predicted finish	Team	Votes (1st place)
1	Drake	566 (39)
2	Northern Iowa	504 (6)
3	Belmont	475 (3)
4	Murray State	391
5	Missouri State	380
6	UIC	347
7	Illinois State	341
8	Valparaiso	193
9	Indiana State	189
10	Southern Illinois	167
11	Bradley	97
12	Evansville	96

=== Preseason All-MVC teams ===
Preseason All-MVC teams
Team	Player	Position	Year
First	Katelyn Young	Forward	Graduate student

== Roster ==
2024–25 Murray State Racers women's basketball team
Players
Coaches

Pos.	#	Name	Height	Year	Previous school	Hometown
G	0	Jada Cook	5 ft 8 in (1.73 m)	Fr	Patrick Henry High School	Roanoke, Virginia
G	1	Halli Poock	5 ft 6 in (1.68 m)	So	Bradley	Waterloo, Iowa
G	2	Haven Ford	5 ft 6 in (1.68 m)	So	Rowan County Senior High School	Morehead, Kentucky
G	3	Briley Pena	5 ft 4 in (1.63 m)	Jr	Nettleton High School	Jonesboro, Arkansas
G	5	Trinity White	5 ft 9 in (1.75 m)	Sr	Butler	McKinney, Texas
G	10	Grace Billington	5 ft 10 in (1.78 m)	Fr	Moberly High School	Moberly, Missouri
G	12	Jenna Walker	5 ft 8 in (1.73 m)	Sr	Western Kentucky	Priceville, Alabama
G/F	14	Ava Learn	6 ft 1 in (1.85 m)	Sr	Purdue	Pleasant Valley, New York
G	20	Braxcynn Baker	5 ft 11 in (1.8 m)	Fr	Lowell High School	Lowell, Michigan
F	22	Cam Hoover	6 ft 0 in (1.83 m)	Fr	Woodridge High School	Cuyahoga Falls, Ohio
F	23	Jazmine Young	6 ft 1 in (1.85 m)	Fr	Hamilton Southeastern High School	Michigan City, Indiana
F	24	Adriana Blazquez	6 ft 0 in (1.83 m)	Fr	ÍES Diego Velázquez	Madrid, Spain
G/F	25	Destiny Thomas	5 ft 10 in (1.78 m)	So	McCracken County High School	Paducah, Kentucky
F	31	Katelyn Young	6 ft 1 in (1.85 m)	GS	Oakwood High School	Oakwood, Illinois
F	33	Adalyn Koelling	6 ft 1 in (1.85 m)	Fr	Helias Catholic High School	Jefferson City, Missouri

Head coach

- Rechelle Turner (Murray State)

Assistant coach(es)

- Monica Evans (Murray State)
- Wyatt Foust (Kentucky Wesleyan)
- Kayla Kleifgen (Eckerd)
- Brittney Patrick (Southern Illinois)
- Nieja Tucker (Austin Peay)

Legend

- (C) Team captain
- (S) Suspended
- (I) Ineligible
- (W) Walk-on
- Injured
- Current redshirt

Roster
Last update: March 18, 2025

== Schedule and results ==
Date time, TV	Rank^{#}	Opponent^{#}	Result	Record	Site (attendance) city, state
Exhibition
October 30, 2024*; 6:00 pm		Bethel (TN)	W 98–66	–	CFSB Center; Murray, KY
Non-conference regular season
November 7, 2024*; 6:00 pm, ESPN+		SIU Edwardsville	W 104–60	1–0	CFSB Center (1,445); Murray, KY
November 12, 2024*; 11:00 am, ESPN+		Southern Indiana	L 75–82	1–1	CFSB Center (2,713); Murray, KY
November 15, 2024*; 7:00 pm, SECN+		at No. 7 LSU	L 60–74	1–2	Pete Maravich Assembly Center (10,181); Baton Rouge, LA
November 23, 2024*; 2:00 pm, ESPN+		at Memphis	W 87–83	2–2	Elma Roane Fieldhouse (1,113); Memphis, TN
November 26, 2024*; 7:00 pm, ESPN+		at Little Rock	W 105–57	3–2	Jack Stephens Center (651); Little Rock, AR
December 3, 2024*; 7:00 pm, ESPN+		at Saint Louis	W 91–66	4–2	Chaifetz Arena (317); St. Louis, MO
December 7, 2024*; 2:00 pm, ESPN+		Austin Peay	W 116–80	5–2	CFSB Center (1,126); Murray, KY
December 15, 2024*; 2:00 pm, SECN+		at Alabama	L 63–90	5–3	Coleman Coliseum (2,600); Tuscaloosa, AL
December 19, 2024*; 6:00 pm, ESPN+		Western Carolina	W 110–79	6–3	CFSB Center (1,037); Murray, KY
MVC regular season
December 29, 2024; 2:00 pm, ESPN+		Illinois State	W 91–80	7–3 (1–0)	CFSB Center (1,478); Murray, KY
January 2, 2025; 6:00 pm, ESPN+		at Southern Illinois	W 93–69	8–3 (2–0)	Banterra Center (424); Carbondale, IL
January 4, 2025; 1:00 pm, ESPN+		at Missouri State	L 78–85	8–4 (2–1)	Great Southern Bank Arena (1,676); Springfield, MO
January 10, 2025; 6:00 pm, ESPN+		Valparaiso	W 82–45	9–4 (3–1)	CFSB Center (873); Murray, KY
January 12, 2025; 2:00 pm, ESPN+		UIC	W 67–60	10–4 (4–1)	CFSB Center (1,521); Murray, KY
January 16, 2025; 6:00 pm, ESPN+		at Northern Iowa	W 95–89	11–4 (5–1)	McLeod Center (2,432); Cedar Falls, IA
January 18, 2025; 2:00 pm, ESPN+		at Drake	W 81–59	12–4 (6–1)	Knapp Center (2,739); Des Moines, IA
January 24, 2025; 6:00 pm, ESPN+		Indiana State	W 97–71	13–4 (7–1)	CFSB Center; Murray, KY
January 26, 2025; 2:00 pm, ESPN+		Evansville	W 104–66	14–4 (8–1)	CFSB Center (1,527); Murray, KY
February 1, 2025; 4:00 pm, ESPN+		at Belmont	L 89–96	14–5 (8–2)	Curb Event Center (1,087); Nashville, TN
February 7, 2025; 7:00 pm, ESPN+		at UIC	L 70–79	14–6 (8–3)	Credit Union 1 Arena (785); Chicago, IL
February 9, 2025; 1:00 pm, ESPN+		at Valparaiso	W 77–57	15–6 (9–3)	Athletics–Recreation Center (352); Valparaiso, IN
February 13, 2025; 6:00 pm, ESPN+		Drake	L 86–92	15–7 (9–4)	CFSB Center (1,811); Murray, KY
February 15, 2025; 3:00 pm, ESPN+		Northern Iowa	W 96–91	16–7 (10–4)	CFSB Center (1,641); Murray, KY
February 20, 2025; 6:00 pm, ESPN+		at Bradley	W 81–55	17–7 (11–4)	Renaissance Coliseum (458); Peoria, IL
February 23, 2025; 2:00 pm, ESPN+		Belmont	W 83–78	18–7 (12–4)	CFSB Center (2,196); Murray, KY
February 27, 2025; 6:00 pm, ESPN+		Missouri State	W 78–67	19–7 (13–4)	CFSB Center (2,577); Murray, KY
March 1, 2025; 2:00 pm, ESPN+		Southern Illinois	W 87–64	20–7 (14–4)	CFSB Center (2,347); Murray, KY
March 6, 2025; 6:00 pm, ESPN+		at Evansville	W 88–60	21–7 (15–4)	Meeks Family Fieldhouse (250); Evansville, IN
March 8, 2025; 1:00 pm, ESPN+		at Indiana State	W 109–70	22–7 (16–4)	Hulman Center (1,227); Terre Haute, IN
MVC tournament
March 14, 2025; 12:00 pm, ESPN+	(1)	vs. (9) Bradley; Quarterfinals	W 86–50	23–7	Ford Center; Evansville, IN
March 15, 2025; 1:30 pm, ESPN+	(1)	vs. (4) Drake; Semifinals	W 96–90	24–7	Ford Center; Evansville, IN
March 16, 2025; 1:00 pm, ESPN2/ESPN+	(1)	vs. (3) Belmont; Championship	W 83–62	25–7	Ford Center (1,503); Evansville, IN
NCAA tournament
March 22, 2025; 11:00 am, ESPN	(11 S4)	vs. (6 S4) Iowa; First Round	L 57–92	25–8	Lloyd Noble Center; Norman, OK
*Non-conference game. ^{#}Rankings from AP Poll. (#) Tournament seedings in parentheses. All times are in Central.
