= 2024–25 Bradley Braves women's basketball team =

American college basketball season

2024–25 Bradley Braves women's basketball
- Conference: Missouri Valley Conference
- Record: 14–19 (7–13 MVC)
- Head coach: Kate Popovec-Goss (3rd season)
- Assistant coaches: JerShon Cobb; Ollie Goss; Stephanie Miller
- Home arena: Renaissance Coliseum

2024–25 Missouri Valley Conference women's basketball standings
	Conf.				Overall
Team	W		L	PCT	W		L	PCT
Murray State †	16	–	4	.800	25	–	8	.758
Missouri State	16	–	4	.800	26	–	9	.743
Belmont	15	–	5	.750	26	–	13	.667
Drake	15	–	5	.750	22	–	12	.647
Illinois State	14	–	6	.700	24	–	13	.649
Northern Iowa	11	–	9	.550	17	–	17	.500
UIC	10	–	10	.500	15	–	18	.455
Valparaiso	9	–	11	.450	13	–	19	.406
Bradley	7	–	13	.350	14	–	19	.424
Evansville	3	–	17	.150	7	–	25	.219
Southern Illinois	2	–	18	.100	4	–	26	.133
Indiana State	2	–	18	.100	4	–	28	.125
† 2025 MVC tournament winner

The 2024–25 Bradley Braves women's basketball team represented Bradley University during the 2024–25 NCAA Division I women's basketball season. The Braves, who were led by third-year head coach Kate Popovec-Goss, played their home games at the Renaissance Coliseum in Peoria, Illinois, as members of the Missouri Valley Conference.

== Previous season ==
The Braves finished the 2023–24 season 6–25, 2–18 in MVC play, to finish in a tie for last place. They were defeated by Murray State in the opening round of the MVC tournament.

== Preseason ==
On October 1, 2024, the MVC released their preseason coaches poll. Bradley was picked to finish eleventh in the MVC regular season.

=== Preseason rankings ===
MVC preseason poll
Predicted finish	Team	Votes (1st place)
1	Drake	566 (39)
2	Northern Iowa	504 (6)
3	Belmont	475 (3)
4	Murray State	391
5	Missouri State	380
6	UIC	347
7	Illinois State	341
8	Valparaiso	193
9	Indiana State	189
10	Southern Illinois	167
11	Bradley	97
12	Evansville	96

=== Preseason All-MVC Teams ===
No Braves were named to the Preseason All-MVC First or Second teams.

== Roster ==
2024–25 Bradley Braves women's basketball team
Players
Coaches

Pos.	#	Name	Height	Year	Previous school	Hometown
G/F	0	Kaylen Nelson	5 ft 10 in (1.78 m)	Sr	Old Dominion	Tulsa, Oklahoma
G/F	1	Claire McDougall	5 ft 11 in (1.8 m)	So	Washington Community High School	Washington, Illinois
G	2	Lucia Llaveria	5 ft 5 in (1.65 m)	Jr	Sagrat Cor Diputació	Sant Vicenç de Montalt, Spain
G/F	3	Lila Posthuma	6 ft 0 in (1.83 m)	Fr	Prescott High School	Prescott, Wisconsin
G	4	Soleil Barnes	5 ft 7 in (1.7 m)	Sr	Toledo	Southfield, Michigan
G	8	Ruba Abo Hashesh	5 ft 5 in (1.65 m)	GS	Iowa Western Community College	Karlstad, Sweden
G	10	Katy Wade	5 ft 6 in (1.68 m)	Sr	Plano West High School	Plano, Texas
G	11	Caitlin Washington	5 ft 8 in (1.73 m)	Fr	Neuqua Valley High School	Naperville, Illinois
F	12	Amy O'Hara	6 ft 2 in (1.88 m)	Jr	George Mason	Melbourne, Australia
G	13	Sheyene Neale	5 ft 8 in (1.73 m)	So	King's Christian Collegiate	Oakville, Ontario
G	14	Inia Jones	5 ft 6 in (1.68 m)	Fr	Omaha Central High School	Omaha, Nebraska
F	20	Ellie McDermid	6 ft 1 in (1.85 m)	Fr	Bay Port High School	Green Bay, Wisconsin
G/F	22	Tamia Perryman	5 ft 8 in (1.73 m)	Sr	Marian	Indianapolis, Indiana
F	30	Carlie Vick	6 ft 2 in (1.88 m)	Jr	Florida Atlantic	St. Albans, Missouri
F	66	Mariam Coulibaly	6 ft 0 in (1.83 m)	Fr	J Addison School	Bamako, Mali

Head coach

- Kate Popovec-Goss (Northwestern)

Assistant coach(es)

- JerShon Cobb (Northwestern)
- Ollie Goss (Bowling Green)
- Stephanie Miller (Michigan State)

Legend

- (C) Team captain
- (S) Suspended
- (I) Ineligible
- (W) Walk-on
- Injured
- Current redshirt

Roster
Last update: April 4, 2025

== Schedule and results ==
Date time, TV	Rank^{#}	Opponent^{#}	Result	Record	Site (attendance) city, state
Exhibition
November 2, 2024*; 2:00 pm		Knox	W 104–69	–	Renaissance Coliseum; Peoria, IL
Non-conference regular season
November 7, 2024*; 6:00 pm, ESPN+		St. Francis (IL)	W 70–32	1–0	Renaissance Coliseum (473); Peoria, IL
November 12, 2024*; 6:00 pm, ESPN+		at Lindenwood	L 56–64	1–1	Hyland Performance Arena (407); St. Charles, MO
November 17, 2024*; 12:00 pm, ESPN+		at Central Michigan	W 66–57	2–1	McGuirk Arena (1,019); Mount Pleasant, MI
November 21, 2024*; 11:00 am, ESPN+		IU Indy	W 72–47	3–1	Renaissance Coliseum; Peoria, IL
November 24, 2024*; 2:00 pm, ESPN+		Western Illinois	L 41–62	3–2	Renaissance Coliseum (385); Peoria, IL
November 27, 2024*; 2:00 pm, ESPN+		Northern Kentucky	W 62–57	4–2	Renaissance Coliseum (501); Peoria, IL
December 3, 2024*; 11:00 am, NEC Front Row		at Chicago State	W 75–57	5–2	Jones Convocation Center (575); Chicago, IL
December 12, 2024*; 6:00 pm, B1G+		at Illinois	L 52–70	5–3	State Farm Center (3,684); Champaign, IL
December 15, 2024*; 2:00 pm, B1G+		at Northwestern	L 57–67	5–4	Welsh–Ryan Arena (1,130); Evanston, IL
December 19, 2024*; 12:30 pm		vs. Bethune–Cookman; Hatter Classic	W 71–36	6–4	Insight Credit Union Arena (122); DeLand, FL
December 20, 2024*; 10:00 am, ESPN+		at Stetson; Hatter Classic	L 58–66	6–5	Insight Credit Union Arena; DeLand, FL
MVC regular season
December 29, 2024; 2:00 pm, ESPN+		at Belmont	L 61–69	6–6 (0–1)	Curb Event Center (1,005); Nashville, TN
January 2, 2025; 6:00 pm, ESPN+		Evansville	W 45–42	7–6 (1–1)	Renaissance Coliseum (453); Peoria, IL
January 5, 2025; 2:00 pm, ESPN+		Indiana State	W 65–52	8–6 (2–1)	Renaissance Coliseum (531); Peoria, IL
January 10, 2025; 6:00 pm, ESPN+		Drake	L 63–67	8–7 (2–2)	Renaissance Coliseum (510); Peoria, IL
January 12, 2025; 2:00 pm, ESPN+		Northern Iowa	L 44–67	8–8 (2–3)	Renaissance Coliseum (652); Peoria, IL
January 17, 2025; 7:00 pm, ESPN+		at UIC	L 49–52	8–9 (2–4)	Credit Union 1 Arena (539); Chicago, IL
January 19, 2025; 1:00 pm, ESPN+		at Valparaiso	L 52–59	8–10 (2–5)	Athletics–Recreation Center (227); Valparaiso, IN
January 26, 2025; 2:00 pm, ESPN+		at Illinois State; I-74 Rivalry	L 58–74	8–11 (2–6)	CEFCU Arena (2,302); Normal, IL
January 31, 2025; 6:00 pm, ESPN+		Missouri State	L 62–73	8–12 (2–7)	Renaissance Coliseum (439); Peoria, IL
February 2, 2025; 2:00 pm, ESPN+		Southern Illinois	W 68–46	9–12 (3–7)	Renaissance Coliseum (513); Peoria, IL
February 7, 2025; 6:00 pm, ESPN+		at Northern Iowa	L 51–69	9–13 (3–8)	McLeod Center (2,853); Cedar Falls, IA
February 9, 2025; 2:00 pm, ESPN+		at Drake	L 52–72	9–14 (3–9)	Knapp Center (2,159); Des Moines, IA
February 13, 2025; 6:00 pm, ESPN+		at Evansville	L 45–55	9–15 (3–10)	Meeks Family Fieldhouse (748); Evansville, IN
February 16, 2025; 1:00 pm, ESPN+		at Indiana State	W 56–54	10–15 (4–10)	Hulman Center (1,090); Terre Haute, IN
February 20, 2025; 6:00 pm, ESPN+		Murray State	L 55–81	10–16 (4–11)	Renaissance Coliseum (458); Peoria, IL
February 23, 2025; 2:00 pm, ESPN+		Illinois State; I-74 Rivalry	W 70–65	11–16 (5–11)	Renaissance Coliseum (951); Peoria, IL
February 27, 2025; 6:00 pm, ESPN+		Valparaiso	L 64–66	11–17 (5–12)	Renaissance Coliseum (662); Peoria, IL
March 1, 2025; 2:00 pm, ESPN+		UIC	W 65–54	12–17 (6–12)	Renaissance Coliseum (907); Peoria, IL
March 6, 2025; 6:00 pm, ESPN+		at Southern Illinois	W 59–51	13–17 (7–12)	Banterra Center (261); Carbondale, IL
March 8, 2025; 1:00 pm, ESPN+		at Missouri State	L 54–64	13–18 (7–13)	Great Southern Bank Arena (4,063); Springfield, MO
MVC tournament
March 13, 2025; 12:00 pm, ESPN+	(9)	vs. (8) Valparaiso; Opening round	W 64–58	14–18	Ford Center; Evansville, IN
March 14, 2025; 12:00 pm, ESPN+	(9)	vs. (1) Murray State; Quarterfinals	L 50–86	14–19	Ford Center; Evansville, IN
*Non-conference game. ^{#}Rankings from AP Poll. (#) Tournament seedings in parentheses. All times are in Central.
