= 2024–25 Valparaiso Beacons women's basketball team =

American college basketball season

2024–25 Valparaiso Beacons women's basketball
- Conference: Missouri Valley Conference
- Record: 13–19 (9–11 MVC)
- Head coach: Mary Evans (7th season)
- Assistant coaches: Jon Hill; Dominique Miller; Andrew Whitt
- Home arena: Athletics–Recreation Center

2024–25 Missouri Valley Conference women's basketball standings
	Conf.				Overall
Team	W		L	PCT	W		L	PCT
Murray State †	16	–	4	.800	25	–	8	.758
Missouri State	16	–	4	.800	26	–	9	.743
Belmont	15	–	5	.750	26	–	13	.667
Drake	15	–	5	.750	22	–	12	.647
Illinois State	14	–	6	.700	24	–	13	.649
Northern Iowa	11	–	9	.550	17	–	17	.500
UIC	10	–	10	.500	15	–	18	.455
Valparaiso	9	–	11	.450	13	–	19	.406
Bradley	7	–	13	.350	14	–	19	.424
Evansville	3	–	17	.150	7	–	25	.219
Southern Illinois	2	–	18	.100	4	–	26	.133
Indiana State	2	–	18	.100	4	–	28	.125
† 2025 MVC tournament winner

The 2024–25 Valparaiso Beacons women's basketball team represented Valparaiso University during the 2024–25 NCAA Division I women's basketball season. The Beacons, who were led by seventh-year head coach Mary Evans, played their home games at the Athletics–Recreation Center in Valparaiso, Indiana as members of the Missouri Valley Conference.

== Previous season ==
The Beacons finished the 2023–24 season 5–23, 4–15 in MVC play, to finish in tenth place. They were defeated by UIC in the opening round of the MVC tournament.

== Preseason ==
On October 1, 2024, the MVC released their preseason coaches poll. Valparaiso was picked to eighth in the MVC regular season.

=== Preseason rankings ===
MVC preseason poll
Predicted finish	Team	Votes (1st place)
1	Drake	566 (39)
2	Northern Iowa	504 (6)
3	Belmont	475 (3)
4	Murray State	391
5	Missouri State	380
6	UIC	347
7	Illinois State	341
8	Valparaiso	193
9	Indiana State	189
10	Southern Illinois	167
11	Bradley	97
12	Evansville	96

=== Preseason All-MVC Teams ===
Preseason All-MVC Team
Team	Player	Position	Year
Second	Leah Earnest	Guard/Forward	Fifth year

== Roster ==
2024–25 Valparaiso Beacons women's basketball team
Players
Coaches

Pos.	#	Name	Height	Year	Previous school	Hometown
G	2	Maci Rhoades	5 ft 11 in (1.8 m)	Jr	Radford	Beavercreek, Ohio
G/F	3	Lexi Castator	6 ft 1 in (1.85 m)	Fr	Northrop High School	Fort Wayne, Indiana
G	4	Fiona Connolly	5 ft 8 in (1.73 m)	Jr	La Salle	South Burlington, Vermont
G	5	Raeven Raye-Redmond	5 ft 6 in (1.68 m)	So	Trotwood-Madison High School	Trotwood, Ohio
G	9	Mor Shabtai	5 ft 4 in (1.63 m)	Fr	Hapoel Petah Tikva	Tel Aviv, Israel
G/F	11	Nevaeh Jackson	6 ft 0 in (1.83 m)	So	Northrop High School	Fort Wayne, Indiana
G/F	12	Saniya Jackson	6 ft 0 in (1.83 m)	So	Northrop High School	Fort Wayne, Indiana
F	20	Katie Beyer	6 ft 1 in (1.85 m)	Sr	McHenry High School	McHenry, Illinois
G/F	21	Layla Gold	5 ft 11 in (1.8 m)	So	Cathedral High School	Indianapolis, Indiana
G/F	22	Leah Earnest (5Y)	5 ft 10 in (1.78 m)	Sr	SPASH	Stevens Point, Wisconsin
G	23	Bella Swedlund	5 ft 8 in (1.73 m)	RS So	Toledo	Winner, South Dakota
F	24	Kayla Preston	6 ft 0 in (1.83 m)	So	Millard North High School	Omaha, Nebraska
F	33	Kylie Waytashek	6 ft 2 in (1.88 m)	Fr	Royalton High School	Royalton, Minnesota

Head coach

- Mary Evans (Georgia Southern)

Assistant coach(es)

- Jon Hill (Southern New Hampshire)
- Dominique Miller (Ohio)
- Andrew Whitt (Ohio)

Legend

- (C) Team captain
- (S) Suspended
- (I) Ineligible
- (W) Walk-on
- (5Y) Fifth-year senior
- Injured
- Current redshirt

Roster
Last update: April 3, 2025

== Schedule and results ==
Date time, TV	Rank^{#}	Opponent^{#}	Result	Record	Site (attendance) city, state
Non-conference regular season
November 4, 2024*; 12:00 pm, Gray Media		vs. Liberty; AIA Total Action Tip-Off	L 58–77	0–1	Wooden Family Fieldhouse (1,200); Xenia, OH
November 9, 2024*; 7:00 pm, ESPN+		Purdue Fort Wayne	L 56–72	0–2	Athletics–Recreation Center (493); Valparaiso, IN
November 12, 2024*; 11:00 am, ESPN+		Trinity Christian	W 81–40	1–2	Athletics–Recreation Center (675); Valparaiso, IN
November 14, 2024*; 6:00 pm, ESPN+		at Milwaukee	L 79–90	1–3	Klotsche Center (574); Milwaukee, WI
November 19, 2024*; 5:00 pm, ESPN+		at Loyola Chicago	L 62–70	1–4	Joseph J. Gentile Arena (451); Chicago, IL
November 25, 2024*; 6:00 pm, ESPN+		Goshen	W 72–41	2–4	Athletics–Recreation Center (207); Valparaiso, IN
November 30, 2024*; 1:30 pm		vs. North Dakota; Christmas City Classic	W 76–57	3–4	Stabler Arena (489); Bethlehem, PA
December 1, 2024*; 1:30 pm, ESPN+		at Lehigh; Christmas City Classic	L 59–77	3–5	Stabler Arena (426); Bethlehem, PA
December 4, 2024*; 6:00 pm, ESPN+		Western Michigan	W 67–54	4–5	Athletics–Recreation Center (234); Valparaiso, IN
December 18, 2024*; 4:00 pm, FDSNMW/ESPN+		at Saint Louis	L 59–69	4–6	Chaifetz Arena; St. Louis, MO
December 21, 2024*; 1:00 pm, ESPN+		Detroit Mercy	L 71–79 ^{2OT}	4–7	Athletics–Recreation Center (377); Valparaiso, IN
MVC regular season
December 29, 2024; 1:00 pm, ESPN+		Southern Illinois	W 69–51	5–7 (1–0)	Athletics–Recreation Center (272); Valparaiso, IN
January 2, 2025; 6:00 pm, ESPN+		at Northern Iowa	L 70–93	5–8 (1–1)	McLeod Center (2,607); Cedar Falls, IA
January 4, 2025; 2:00 pm, ESPN+		at Drake	L 64–82	5–9 (1–2)	Knapp Center (2,656); Des Moines, IA
January 10, 2025; 6:00 pm, ESPN+		at Murray State	L 45–82	5–10 (1–3)	CFSB Center (873); Murray, KY
January 12, 2025; 2:00 pm, ESPN+		at Belmont	L 53–67	5–11 (1–4)	Curb Event Center (1,012); Nashville, TN
January 17, 2025; 6:00 pm, ESPN+		Illinois State	L 65–79	5–12 (1–5)	Athletics–Recreation Center (242); Valparaiso, IN
January 19, 2025; 1:00 pm, ESPN+		Bradley	W 59–52	6–12 (2–5)	Athletics–Recreation Center (227); Valparaiso, IN
January 26, 2025; 2:00 pm, ESPN+		at UIC	L 45–60	6–13 (2–6)	Credit Union 1 Arena (639); Chicago, IL
January 30, 2025; 6:00 pm, ESPN+		at Indiana State	W 73–54	7–13 (3–6)	Hulman Center (1,201); Terre Haute, IN
February 1, 2025; 5:00 pm, ESPN+		at Evansville	W 66–54	8–13 (4–6)	Meeks Family Fieldhouse (618); Evansville, IN
February 7, 2025; 6:00 pm, ESPN+		Belmont	L 41–69	8–14 (4–7)	Athletics–Recreation Center (272); Valparaiso, IN
February 9, 2025; 1:00 pm, ESPN+		Murray State	L 57–77	8–15 (4–8)	Athletics–Recreation Center (352); Valparaiso, IN
February 13, 2025; 6:00 pm, ESPN+		UIC	W 60–51	9–15 (5–8)	Athletics–Recreation Center (285); Valparaiso, IN
February 16, 2025; 2:00 pm, ESPN+		at Missouri State	L 63–79	9–16 (5–9)	Great Southern Bank Arena (2,592); Springfield, MO
February 21, 2025; 6:00 pm, ESPN+		Evansville	W 76–55	10–16 (6–9)	Athletics–Recreation Center (539); Valparaiso, IN
February 23, 2025; 1:00 pm, ESPN+		Indiana State	W 73–68	11–16 (7–9)	Athletics–Recreation Center (325); Valparaiso, IN
February 27, 2025; 6:00 pm, ESPN+		at Bradley	W 66–64	12–16 (8–9)	Renaissance Coliseum (662); Peoria, IL
March 1, 2025; 4:00 pm, ESPN+		at Illinois State	L 68–90	12–17 (8–10)	CEFCU Arena (2,621); Normal, IL
March 6, 2025; 6:00 pm, ESPN+		Drake	W 66–65	13–17 (9–10)	Athletics–Recreation Center (290); Valparaiso, IN
March 8, 2025; 1:00 pm, ESPN+		Northern Iowa	L 73–85	13–18 (9–11)	Athletics–Recreation Center (421); Valparaiso, IN
MVC tournament
March 13, 2025; 12:00 pm, ESPN+	(8)	vs. (9) Bradley; Opening round	L 58–64	13–19	Ford Center; Evansville, IN
*Non-conference game. ^{#}Rankings from AP Poll. (#) Tournament seedings in parentheses. All times are in Central.
