= 2024–25 Missouri State Lady Bears basketball team =

American college basketball season

2024–25 Missouri State Lady Bears basketball

WBIT, Second Round
- Conference: Missouri Valley Conference
- Record: 26–9 (16–4 MVC)
- Head coach: Beth Cunningham (3rd season)
- Associate head coach: Darren Guensch
- Assistant coaches: Kenzie Kostas; Olivia Applewhite; Abby Emmert
- Home arena: Great Southern Bank Arena

2024–25 Missouri Valley Conference women's basketball standings
	Conf.				Overall
Team	W		L	PCT	W		L	PCT
Murray State †	16	–	4	.800	25	–	8	.758
Missouri State	16	–	4	.800	26	–	9	.743
Belmont	15	–	5	.750	26	–	13	.667
Drake	15	–	5	.750	22	–	12	.647
Illinois State	14	–	6	.700	24	–	13	.649
Northern Iowa	11	–	9	.550	17	–	17	.500
UIC	10	–	10	.500	15	–	18	.455
Valparaiso	9	–	11	.450	13	–	19	.406
Bradley	7	–	13	.350	14	–	19	.424
Evansville	3	–	17	.150	7	–	25	.219
Southern Illinois	2	–	18	.100	4	–	26	.133
Indiana State	2	–	18	.100	4	–	28	.125
† 2025 MVC tournament winner

The 2024–25 Missouri State Lady Bears basketball team represented Missouri State University during the 2024–25 NCAA Division I women's basketball season. The Lady Bears, who were led by third-year head coach Beth Cunningham, played their home games at the Great Southern Bank Arena in Springfield, Missouri, as members of the Missouri Valley Conference.

This was Missouri State's final season as members of the Missouri Valley Conference, as they will be moving to Conference USA, effective July 1, 2025.

== Previous season ==
The Lady Bears finished the 2023–24 season 23–10, 15–5 in MVC play, to finish in third place. They would defeat Murray State, and Belmont, before falling to top-seeded Drake in the MVC tournament. They received an at-large bid to the WBIT, where they would be defeated by Illinois in the first round.

== Preseason ==
On October 1, 2024, the MVC released their preseason coaches poll. Missouri State was picked to finish fifth in the MVC regular season.

=== Preseason rankings ===
MVC preseason poll
Predicted finish	Team	Votes (1st place)
1	Drake	566 (39)
2	Northern Iowa	504 (6)
3	Belmont	475 (3)
4	Murray State	391
5	Missouri State	380
6	UIC	347
7	Illinois State	341
8	Valparaiso	193
9	Indiana State	189
10	Southern Illinois	167
11	Bradley	97
12	Evansville	96

=== Preseason All-MVC Teams ===
Preseason All-MVC Team
Team	Player	Position	Year
First	Lacy Stokes	Guard	Senior

== Roster ==
2024–25 Missouri State Lady Bears women's basketball team
Players
Coaches

Pos.	#	Name	Height	Year	Previous school	Hometown
G	1	JaNyla Bush	5 ft 3 in (1.6 m)	Fr	Link Academy	St. Louis, Missouri
F	2	Lainie Douglas	6 ft 3 in (1.91 m)	Fr	Blue Valley Northwest High School	Overland Park, Kansas
G	4	Lacy Stokes	5 ft 4 in (1.63 m)	Sr	Missouri Southern	Mount Vernon, Missouri
G	8	Kiley Bess	6 ft 0 in (1.83 m)	Sr	Indiana State	Poplar Bluff, Missouri
F	12	Tyra Robinson	6 ft 3 in (1.91 m)	So	Western Carolina	Little Rock, Arkansas
F	13	Sarah Linthacum	6 ft 3 in (1.91 m)	Sr	Missouri	Jefferson City, Missouri
G	20	Angel Scott	5 ft 10 in (1.78 m)	Sr	Stephen F. Austin	Edmond, Oklahoma
G	21	Kyrah Daniels	6 ft 0 in (1.83 m)	So	ThunderRidge High School	Highlands Ranch, Colorado
G	22	Paige Rocca	5 ft 9 in (1.75 m)	Sr	Iowa City High School	Iowa City, Iowa
G	23	Zoe Stewart	5 ft 10 in (1.78 m)	RS So	Murray State	Terre Haute, Indiana
G	24	Kaemyn Bekemeier	5 ft 9 in (1.75 m)	So	Republic High School	Republic, Missouri
G	32	Cady Pauley	5 ft 11 in (1.8 m)	Jr	Virginia	Milan, Missouri
F	33	Blake O'Grady	6 ft 0 in (1.83 m)	So	Dexter Southfield School	Brookline, Massachusetts

Head coach

- Beth Cunningham (Notre Dame)

Assistant coach(es)

- Darren Guensch (Radford)
- Kenzie Kostas (Missouri State)
- Olivia Applewhite (Dayton)
- Abby Emmert (Missouri State)

Legend

- (C) Team captain
- (S) Suspended
- (I) Ineligible
- (W) Walk-on
- Injured
- Current redshirt

Roster
Last update: March 25, 2025

== Schedule and results ==
Date time, TV	Rank^{#}	Opponent^{#}	Result	Record	Site (attendance) city, state
Exhibition
November 4, 2024*; 6:30 pm		Missouri S&T	W 76–30	–	Great Southern Bank Arena (1,412); Springfield, MO
Non-conference regular season
November 10, 2024*; 2:00 pm, ESPN+		Tulsa	W 63–61	1–0	Great Southern Bank Arena (1,803); Springfield, MO
November 13, 2024*; 6:00 pm, ESPN+		at Wichita State	W 82–77	2–0	Charles Koch Arena (1,045); Wichita, KS
November 19, 2024*; 11:00 am, ESPN+		at UT Martin	L 66–74	2–1	Skyhawk Arena (2,483); Martin, TN
November 23, 2024*; 1:00 pm, ESPN+		at Saint Louis	W 91–68	3–1	Chaifetz Arena (725); St. Louis, MO
November 28, 2024*; 4:30 pm, ESPN+		vs. Gonzaga; Paradise Jam Reef Division	W 65–64	4–1	Sports and Fitness Center; St. Thomas, USVI
November 29, 2024*; 4:30 pm, ESPN+		vs. Florida State; Paradise Jam Reef Division	L 66–97	4–2	Sports and Fitness Center; St. Thomas, USVI
November 30, 2024*; 4:30 pm, ESPN+		vs. Texas Tech; Paradise Jam Reef Division	L 69–72	4–3	Sports and Fitness Center; St. Thomas, USVI
December 6, 2024*; 6:30 pm, ESPN+		Wyoming	W 62–50	5–3	Great Southern Bank Arena (2,155); Springfield, MO
December 14, 2024*; 1:00 pm, ESPN+		Little Rock	W 67–45	6–3	Great Southern Bank Arena (1,853); Springfield, MO
December 16, 2024*; 11:00 am, ESPN+		at Southeast Missouri State	W 77–49	7–3	Show Me Center (2,130); Cape Girardeau, MO
December 20, 2024*; 12:00 pm, ESPN+		Southern Miss	W 92–54	8–3	Great Southern Bank Arena (1,731); Springfield, MO
MVC regular season
December 29, 2024; 3:00 pm, ESPN+		at UIC	L 62–69	8–4 (0–1)	Credit Union 1 Arena (485); Chicago, IL
January 2, 2025; 6:30 pm, ESPN+		Belmont	W 57–55	9–4 (1–1)	Great Southern Bank Arena (2,093); Springfield, MO
January 4, 2025; 1:00 pm, ESPN+		Murray State	W 85–78	10–4 (2–1)	Great Southern Bank Arena (1,676); Springfield, MO
January 12, 2025; 2:00 pm, ESPN+		Southern Illinois	W 75–37	11–4 (3–1)	Great Southern Bank Arena (2,528); Springfield, MO
January 17, 2025; 6:00 pm, ESPN+		at Evansville	W 84–57	12–4 (4–1)	Meeks Family Fieldhouse (352); Evansville, IN
January 19, 2025; 1:00 pm, ESPN+		at Indiana State	W 73–57	13–4 (5–1)	Hulman Center (1,262); Terre Haute, IN
January 24, 2025; 6:30 pm, ESPN+		Drake	W 72–68 ^{OT}	14–4 (6–1)	Great Southern Bank Arena (3,115); Springfield, MO
January 26, 2025; 2:00 pm, ESPN+		Northern Iowa	W 81–45	15–4 (7–1)	Great Southern Bank Arena (2,241); Springfield, MO
January 31, 2025; 6:00 pm, ESPN+		at Bradley	W 73–62	16–4 (8–1)	Renaissance Coliseum (439); Peoria, IL
February 2, 2025; 2:00 pm, ESPN+		at Illinois State	L 55–66	16–5 (8–2)	CEFCU Arena (2,784); Normal, IL
February 7, 2025; 6:30 pm, ESPN+		Indiana State	W 76–61	17–5 (9–2)	Great Southern Bank Arena (2,091); Springfield, MO
February 9, 2025; 2:00 pm, ESPN+		Evansville	W 86–57	18–5 (10–2)	Great Southern Bank Arena (1,465); Springfield, MO
February 13, 2025; 6:00 pm, ESPN+		at Southern Illinois	W 83–48	19–5 (11–2)	Banterra Center (305); Carbondale, IL
February 16, 2025; 2:00 pm, ESPN+		Valparaiso	W 79–63	20–5 (12–2)	Great Southern Bank Arena (2,592); Springfield, MO
February 20, 2025; 6:00 pm, ESPN+		at Northern Iowa	W 75–72 ^{OT}	21–5 (13–2)	McLeod Center (2,638); Cedar Falls, IA
February 22, 2025; 2:00 pm, ESPN+		at Drake	W 82–79 ^{OT}	22–5 (14–2)	Knapp Center (2,933); Des Moines, IA
February 27, 2025; 6:00 pm, ESPN+		at Murray State	L 67–78	22–6 (14–3)	CFSB Center (2,577); Murray, KY
March 1, 2025; 4:00 pm, ESPN+		at Belmont	L 61–67	22–7 (14–4)	Curb Event Center (1,031); Nashville, TN
March 6, 2025; 6:30 pm, ESPN+		Illinois State	W 72–47	23–7 (15–4)	Great Southern Bank Arena (2,415); Springfield, MO
March 8, 2025; 1:00 pm, ESPN+		Bradley	W 64–54	24–7 (16–4)	Great Southern Bank Arena (4,063); Springfield, MO
MVC tournament
March 14, 2025; 6:00 pm, ESPN+	(2)	vs. (7) UIC; Quarterfinals	W 77–70	25–7	Ford Center; Evansville, IN
March 15, 2025; 4:00 pm, ESPN+	(2)	vs. (3) Belmont; Semifinals	L 67–76	25–8	Ford Center (1,566); Evansville, IN
WBIT
March 20, 2025*; 6:30 pm, ESPN+	(3)	Oral Roberts; First Round	W 107–76	26–8	Great Southern Bank Arena (2,032); Springfield, MO
March 23, 2025*; 2:00 pm, ESPN+	(3)	(2) Minnesota; Second Round	L 71–78	26–9	Great Southern Bank Arena (2,416); Springfield, MO
*Non-conference game. ^{#}Rankings from AP Poll. (#) Tournament seedings in parentheses. All times are in Central.
