= 2024–25 UIC Flames women's basketball team =

American college basketball season

2024–25 UIC Flames women's basketball

WNIT, Second Round
- Conference: Missouri Valley Conference
- Record: 15–18 (10–10 MVC)
- Head coach: Ashleen Bracey (3rd season)
- Assistant coaches: Caprice Smith; Remy Lory; John McCray; Kara Rawls
- Home arena: Credit Union 1 Arena

2024–25 Missouri Valley Conference women's basketball standings
	Conf.				Overall
Team	W		L	PCT	W		L	PCT
Murray State †	16	–	4	.800	25	–	8	.758
Missouri State	16	–	4	.800	26	–	9	.743
Belmont	15	–	5	.750	26	–	13	.667
Drake	15	–	5	.750	22	–	12	.647
Illinois State	14	–	6	.700	24	–	13	.649
Northern Iowa	11	–	9	.550	17	–	17	.500
UIC	10	–	10	.500	15	–	18	.455
Valparaiso	9	–	11	.450	13	–	19	.406
Bradley	7	–	13	.350	14	–	19	.424
Evansville	3	–	17	.150	7	–	25	.219
Southern Illinois	2	–	18	.100	4	–	26	.133
Indiana State	2	–	18	.100	4	–	28	.125
† 2025 MVC tournament winner

The 2024–25 UIC Flames women's basketball team represented the University of Illinois Chicago during the 2024–25 NCAA Division I women's basketball season. The Flames, who were led by third-year head coach Ashleen Bracey, played their home games at Credit Union 1 Arena in Chicago, Illinois as members of the Missouri Valley Conference.

== Previous season ==
The Flames finished the 2023–24 season 18–16, 10–10 in MVC play, to finish in seventh place. They defeated Valparaiso, before falling to Belmont in the quarterfinals of the MVC tournament. They received an at-large bid to the WNIT, where they would be defeated by Southern Indiana in the first round.

== Preseason ==
On October 1, 2024, the MVC released their preseason coaches poll. UIC was picked to finish sixth in the MVC regular season.

=== Preseason rankings ===
MVC preseason poll
Predicted finish	Team	Votes (1st place)
1	Drake	566 (39)
2	Northern Iowa	504 (6)
3	Belmont	475 (3)
4	Murray State	391
5	Missouri State	380
6	UIC	347
7	Illinois State	341
8	Valparaiso	193
9	Indiana State	189
10	Southern Illinois	167
11	Bradley	97
12	Evansville	96

=== Preseason All-MVC Teams ===
Preseason All-MVC Team
Team	Player	Position	Year
Second	Keimari Rimmer	Forward	Graduate student

== Roster ==
2024–25 UIC Flames women's basketball team
Players
Coaches

Pos.	#	Name	Height	Year	Previous school	Hometown
G	0	Jalysa Stokes	5 ft 5 in (1.65 m)	Sr	UMSL	Joliet, Illinois
G	1	Kristian Young	5 ft 5 in (1.65 m)	GS	Lawrence North High School	Indianapolis, Indiana
G	2	Chantrel "Tutu" Clayton	5 ft 6 in (1.68 m)	Fr	Vashon High School	St. Louis, Missouri
G	3	Sara Zabrecky	5 ft 9 in (1.75 m)	GS	St. John's	Munster, Indiana
F	4	Jaida McCloud	6 ft 3 in (1.91 m)	GS	Richwoods High School	Peoria, Illinois
F	5	Ky Dempsey-Toney	6 ft 2 in (1.88 m)	Sr	Franklin High School	Franklin, New Jersey
G	11	Arin Freeman	5 ft 7 in (1.7 m)	Sr	Coastal Carolina	Little Rock, Arkansas
F	12	Julia Coleman	6 ft 0 in (1.83 m)	So	Texas State	St. Louis, Missouri
G	14	Krystyna Ellew	5 ft 10 in (1.78 m)	Sr	Wisconsin	Chicago, Illinois
C	16	Magdalena Winter	6 ft 4 in (1.93 m)	Fr	Schul- und Leistungssportzentrum Berlin	Berlin, Germany
G	20	Sandra Frau-Garcia	5 ft 7 in (1.7 m)	Sr	Casper College	Pego, Spain
F	22	Keimari Rimmer	5 ft 10 in (1.78 m)	GS	DePaul	Chicago, Illinois
G/F	23	Makiyah Williams	6 ft 0 in (1.83 m)	Sr	Marquette	Chicago, Illinois
G	24	Megen Sanaj	5 ft 7 in (1.7 m)	So	Latin School of Chicago	Chicago, Illinois
G	25	Danyel Middleton	5 ft 10 in (1.78 m)	GS	Marquette	Chicago, Illinois

Head coach

- Ashleen Bracey (Illinois State)

Assistant coach(es)

- Caprice Smith (DePaul)
- Remy Lory (Southeastern)
- John McCray (Ohio State)
- Kara Rawls (UAB)

Legend

- (C) Team captain
- (S) Suspended
- (I) Ineligible
- (W) Walk-on
- Injured
- Current redshirt

Roster
Last update: April 3, 2025

== Schedule and results ==
Date time, TV	Rank^{#}	Opponent^{#}	Result	Record	Site (attendance) city, state
Exhibition
October 29, 2024*; 6:00 pm		Roosevelt	W 58–52	–	Credit Union 1 Arena; Chicago, IL
Non-conference regular season
November 5, 2024*; 7:00 pm, ESPN+		Cincinnati	L 54–66	0–1	Credit Union 1 Arena (416); Chicago, IL
November 13, 2024*; 7:00 pm, ESPN+		Green Bay	L 71–74	0–2	Credit Union 1 Arena (667); Chicago, IL
November 21, 2024*; 6:30 pm, B1G+		at Wisconsin	L 57–61	0–3	Kohl Center (2,728); Madison, WI
November 27, 2024*; 6:00 pm, ESPN+		at Northern Illinois	W 69–66	1–3	NIU Convocation Center (805); DeKalb, IL
December 1, 2024*; 12:00 pm, SLN		at St. Thomas	L 71–75	1–4	Schoenecker Arena (411); St. Paul, MN
December 8, 2024*; 12:00 pm, ESPN+		North Central	W 113–53	2–4	Credit Union 1 Arena (346); Chicago, IL
December 13, 2024*; 7:00 pm, FloHoops		at DePaul	L 56–73	2–5	Wintrust Arena (1,430); Chicago, IL
December 19, 2024*; 7:00 pm, ESPN+		No. 5 LSU	L 73–91	2–6	Credit Union 1 Arena (4,322); Chicago, IL
December 22, 2024*; 12:00 pm, ESPN+		Ohio	W 91–45	3–6	Credit Union 1 Arena (535); Chicago, IL
MVC regular season
December 29, 2024; 3:00 pm, ESPN+		Missouri State	W 69–62	4–6 (1–0)	Credit Union 1 Arena (485); Chicago, IL
January 2, 2025; 6:00 pm, ESPN+		at Drake	L 63–86	4–7 (1–1)	Knapp Center (2,316); Des Moines, IA
January 4, 2025; 2:00 pm, ESPN+		at Northern Iowa	L 64–75	4–8 (1–2)	McLeod Center (2,543); Cedar Falls, IA
January 10, 2025; 2:00 pm, ESPN+		at Belmont	L 52–67	4–9 (1–3)	Curb Event Center (514); Nashville, TN
January 12, 2025; 2:00 pm, ESPN+		at Murray State	L 60–67	4–10 (1–4)	CFSB Center (1,521); Murray, KY
January 17, 2025; 7:00 pm, ESPN+		Bradley	W 52–49	5–10 (2–4)	Credit Union 1 Arena (539); Chicago, IL
January 19, 2025; 2:00 pm, ESPN+		Illinois State	L 66–75	5–11 (2–5)	Credit Union 1 Arena (728); Chicago, IL
January 26, 2025; 2:00 pm, ESPN+		Valparaiso	W 60–45	6–11 (3–5)	Credit Union 1 Arena (639); Chicago, IL
January 30, 2025; 6:00 pm, ESPN+		at Evansville	W 74–43	7–11 (4–5)	Meeks Family Fieldhouse (315); Evansville, IN
February 1, 2025; 1:00 pm, ESPN+		at Indiana State	W 58–53	8–11 (5–5)	Hulman Center (1,278); Terre Haute, IN
February 7, 2025; 7:00 pm, ESPN+		Murray State	W 79–70	9–11 (6–5)	Credit Union 1 Arena (785); Chicago, IL
February 9, 2025; 1:00 pm, ESPN+		Belmont	L 55–64	9–12 (6–6)	Credit Union 1 Arena (684); Chicago, IL
February 13, 2025; 6:00 pm, ESPN+		at Valparaiso	L 51–60	9–13 (6–7)	Athletics–Recreation Center (285); Valparaiso, IN
February 16, 2025; 2:00 pm, ESPN+		at Southern Illinois	W 62–46	10–13 (7–7)	Banterra Center (451); Carbondale, IL
February 21, 2025; 11:00 am, ESPN+		Indiana State	W 94–71	11–13 (8–7)	Credit Union 1 Arena (3,025); Chicago, IL
February 23, 2025; 2:00 pm, ESPN+		Evansville	W 71–54	12–13 (9–7)	Credit Union 1 Arena (805); Chicago, IL
February 27, 2025; 6:30 pm, ESPN+		at Illinois State	L 64–65	12–14 (9–8)	CEFCU Arena (1,821); Normal, IL
March 1, 2025; 2:00 pm, ESPN+		at Bradley	L 54–65	12–15 (9–9)	Renaissance Coliseum (907); Peoria, IL
March 6, 2025; 7:00 pm, ESPN+		Northern Iowa	W 76–57	13–15 (10–9)	Credit Union 1 Arena (464); Chicago, IL
March 8, 2025; 2:00 pm, ESPN+		Drake	L 49–69	13–16 (10–10)	Credit Union 1 Arena (758); Chicago, IL
MVC tournament
March 13, 2025; 6:00 pm, ESPN+	(7)	vs. (10) Evansville; Opening round	W 72–62	14–16	Ford Center; Evansville, IN
March 14, 2025; 6:00 pm, ESPN+	(7)	vs. (2) Missouri State; Quarterfinals	L 70–77	14–17	Ford Center; Evansville, IN
WNIT
March 21, 2025*; 7:00 pm, ESPN+		UAB; First round	W 63–48	15–17	Credit Union 1 Arena (382); Chicago, IL
March 23, 2025*; 12:00 pm, YouTube		at Butler; Second round	L 54–61	15–18	Hinkle Fieldhouse (445); Indianapolis, IN
*Non-conference game. ^{#}Rankings from AP Poll. (#) Tournament seedings in parentheses. All times are in Central.
