= 2024–25 Evansville Purple Aces women's basketball team =

American college basketball season

2024–25 Evansville Purple Aces women's basketball
- Conference: Missouri Valley Conference
- Record: 7–25 (3–17 MVC)
- Head coach: Robyn Scherr (4th season)
- Associate head coach: Dodie Dunson
- Assistant coaches: Zhaque Gray; Anna Newman; Tyler McCormick
- Home arena: Meeks Family Fieldhouse

2024–25 Missouri Valley Conference women's basketball standings
	Conf.				Overall
Team	W		L	PCT	W		L	PCT
Murray State †	16	–	4	.800	25	–	8	.758
Missouri State	16	–	4	.800	26	–	9	.743
Belmont	15	–	5	.750	26	–	13	.667
Drake	15	–	5	.750	22	–	12	.647
Illinois State	14	–	6	.700	24	–	13	.649
Northern Iowa	11	–	9	.550	17	–	17	.500
UIC	10	–	10	.500	15	–	18	.455
Valparaiso	9	–	11	.450	13	–	19	.406
Bradley	7	–	13	.350	14	–	19	.424
Evansville	3	–	17	.150	7	–	25	.219
Southern Illinois	2	–	18	.100	4	–	26	.133
Indiana State	2	–	18	.100	4	–	28	.125
† 2025 MVC tournament winner

The 2024–25 Evansville Purple Aces women's basketball team represented the University of Evansville during the 2024–25 NCAA Division I women's basketball season. The Purple Aces, who were led by fourth-year head coach Robyn Scherr, played their home games at Meeks Family Fieldhouse in Evansville, Indiana as members of the Missouri Valley Conference.

== Previous season ==
The Purple Aces finished the 2023–24 season 4–27, 2–18 in MVC play, to finish in a tie for last place. They were defeated by Illinois State in the opening round of the MVC tournament.

== Preseason ==
On October 1, 2024, the MVC released their preseason coaches poll. Evansville was picked to finish last in the MVC regular season.

=== Preseason rankings ===
MVC preseason poll
Predicted finish	Team	Votes (1st place)
1	Drake	566 (39)
2	Northern Iowa	504 (6)
3	Belmont	475 (3)
4	Murray State	391
5	Missouri State	380
6	UIC	347
7	Illinois State	341
8	Valparaiso	193
9	Indiana State	189
10	Southern Illinois	167
11	Bradley	97
12	Evansville	96

=== Preseason All-MVC Teams ===
No Purple Aces were named to the Preseason All-MVC First or Second teams.

== Roster ==
2024–25 Evansville Purple Aces women's basketball team
Players
Coaches

Pos.	#	Name	Height	Year	Previous school	Hometown
F	0	Mira Hanna	6 ft 0 in (1.83 m)	Jr	Little Rock	Palm Harbor, Florida
PG	1	Avery Kelley	5 ft 6 in (1.68 m)	Fr	Reitz Memorial High School	Evansville, Indiana
G	2	Alana Striverson	5 ft 10 in (1.78 m)	Sr	Lindenwood	Sellersburg, Indiana
F	4	Tamesha "Mae" Dozier	6 ft 1 in (1.85 m)	Jr	Wabash Valley College	Louisville, Kentucky
G	5	Júlia Palomo	5 ft 7 in (1.7 m)	Sr	Casper College	La Seu d'Urgell, Spain
G	10	Camryn Runner	5 ft 8 in (1.73 m)	Fr	Hamilton Heights High School	Cicero, Indiana
G	11	Kaiden Kreinhagen	5 ft 8 in (1.73 m)	Fr	North Central High School	Indianapolis, Indiana
G	12	Tené Smith	5 ft 6 in (1.68 m)	So	King's Christian Collegiate	Brampton, Ontario
G	13	Madlena Gerke	5 ft 10 in (1.78 m)	Sr	Eastern Florida State College	Riga, Latvia
G/F	15	Elle Snyder	5 ft 9 in (1.75 m)	Fr	Greater Latrobe High School	Latrobe, Pennsylvania
G	20	Kylee Norkus	5 ft 10 in (1.78 m)	Fr	Neuqua Valley High School	Naperville, Illinois
F	21	Anica Skrivan	6 ft 1 in (1.85 m)	Sr	Northeastern Oklahoma A&M College	Trebinje, Bosnia and Herzegovina
F	24	Maggie Hartwig	6 ft 1 in (1.85 m)	So	Sauk Prairie High School	Sauk City, Wisconsin
F	25	Claudia Clement	6 ft 3 in (1.91 m)	So	Winthrop	Barcelona, Spain
G	33	Logan Luebbers Palmer	5 ft 9 in (1.75 m)	Fr	Randall K. Cooper High School	Union, Kentucky

Head coach

- Robyn Scherr (Michigan)

Assistant coach(es)

- Dodie Dunson (Bradley)
- Zhaque Gray (Penn State)
- Anna Newman (Evansville)
- Tyler McCormick (Missouri Southern)

Legend

- (C) Team captain
- (S) Suspended
- (I) Ineligible
- (W) Walk-on
- Injured
- Current redshirt

Roster
Last update: April 4, 2025

== Schedule and results ==
Date time, TV	Rank^{#}	Opponent^{#}	Result	Record	Site (attendance) city, state
Exhibition
October 30, 2024*; 6:00 pm		Franklin	W 86–60	–	Meeks Family Fieldhouse; Evansville, IN
Non-conference regular season
November 5, 2024*; 5:30 pm, ESPN+		at IU Indy	L 76–101	0–1	The Jungle (706); Indianapolis, IN
November 10, 2024*; 11:00 am, ESPN+		Wright State	W 65–63	1–1	Meeks Family Fieldhouse (392); Evansville, IN
November 14, 2024*; 6:00 pm, ESPN+		Southeast Missouri State	W 70–55	2–1	Meeks Family Fieldhouse; Evansville, IN
November 18, 2024*; 6:00 pm, ESPN+		at Lindenwood	L 69–71 ^{OT}	2–2	Hyland Performance Arena (472); St. Charles, MO
November 23, 2024*; 12:00 pm, ESPN+		at Lipscomb	L 79–86	2–3	Allen Arena (327); Nashville, TN
November 29, 2024*; 8:00 pm, YouTube		vs. Nicholls; Big Easy New Orleans Classic	L 50–63	2–4	Alario Center (204); Westwego, LA
November 30, 2024*; 5:45 pm, YouTube		vs. Delaware; Big Easy New Orleans Classic	L 54–65	2–5	Alario Center (108); Westwego, LA
December 8, 2024*; 1:00 pm, ESPN+		SIU Edwardsville	W 87–74	3–5	Meeks Family Fieldhouse (412); Evansville, IN
December 14, 2024*; 2:00 pm, SECN+		at Vanderbilt	L 40–106	3–6	Memorial Gymnasium (2,599); Nashville, TN
December 17, 2024*; 11:00 am, ESPN+		IU Columbus	W 84–52	4–6	Meeks Family Fieldhouse (2,120); Evansville, IN
December 21, 2024*; 2:00 pm, ESPN+		at Loyola Chicago	L 57–70	4–7	Joseph J. Gentile Arena (447); Chicago, IL
MVC regular season
December 29, 2024; 12:00 pm, ESPN+		Drake	L 54–76	4–8 (0–1)	Meeks Family Fieldhouse (807); Evansville, IN
January 2, 2025; 6:00 pm, ESPN+		at Bradley	L 42–45	4–9 (0–2)	Renaissance Coliseum (453); Peoria, IL
January 4, 2025; 4:00 pm, ESPN+		at Illinois State	L 55–79	4–10 (0–3)	CEFCU Arena (1,483); Normal, IL
January 12, 2025; 1:00 pm, ESPN+		at Indiana State	L 74–90	4–11 (0–4)	Hulman Center (1,472); Terre Haute, IN
January 17, 2025; 6:00 pm, ESPN+		Missouri State	L 57–84	4–12 (0–5)	Meeks Family Fieldhouse (352); Evansville, IN
January 19, 2025; 1:00 pm, ESPN+		Southern Illinois	W 85–70	5–12 (1–5)	Meeks Family Fieldhouse (410); Evansville, IN
January 24, 2025; 6:30 pm, ESPN+		at Belmont	L 65–90	5–13 (1–6)	Curb Event Center (933); Nashville, TN
January 26, 2025; 2:00 pm, ESPN+		at Murray State	L 66–104	5–14 (1–7)	CFSB Center (1,527); Murray, KY
January 30, 2025; 6:00 pm, ESPN+		UIC	L 43–74	5–15 (1–8)	Meeks Family Fieldhouse (315); Evansville, IN
February 1, 2025; 5:00 pm, ESPN+		Valparaiso	L 54–66	5–16 (1–9)	Meeks Family Fieldhouse (618); Evansville, IN
February 7, 2025; 6:00 pm, ESPN+		at Southern Illinois	L 69–72	5–17 (1–10)	Banterra Center (343); Carbondale, IL
February 9, 2025; 2:00 pm, ESPN+		at Missouri State	L 57–86	5–18 (1–11)	Great Southern Bank Arena (1,465); Springfield, MO
February 13, 2025; 6:00 pm, ESPN+		Bradley	W 55–45	6–18 (2–11)	Meeks Family Fieldhouse (748); Evansville, IN
February 15, 2025; 2:00 pm, ESPN+		Illinois State	L 53–73	6–19 (2–12)	Meeks Family Fieldhouse (318); Evansville, IN
February 21, 2025; 6:00 pm, ESPN+		at Valparaiso	L 55–76	6–20 (2–13)	Athletics–Recreation Center (539); Valparaiso, IN
February 23, 2025; 2:00 pm, ESPN+		at UIC	L 54–71	6–21 (2–14)	Credit Union 1 Arena (805); Chicago, IL
February 27, 2025; 6:00 pm, ESPN+		at Northern Iowa	L 54–71	6–22 (2–15)	McLeod Center (2,796); Cedar Falls, IA
March 1, 2025; 5:00 pm, ESPN+		Indiana State	W 79–68	7–22 (3–15)	Meeks Family Fieldhouse (526); Evansville, IN
March 6, 2025; 6:00 pm, ESPN+		Murray State	L 60–88	7–23 (3–16)	Meeks Family Fieldhouse (250); Evansville, IN
March 8, 2025; 2:00 pm, ESPN+		Belmont	L 48–75	7–24 (3–17)	Meeks Family Fieldhouse (315); Evansville, IN
MVC tournament
March 13, 2025; 6:00 pm, ESPN+	(10)	vs. (7) UIC; Opening round	L 62–72	7–25	Ford Center; Evansville, IN
*Non-conference game. ^{#}Rankings from AP Poll. (#) Tournament seedings in parentheses. All times are in Central.
