= 2024–25 Southern Illinois Salukis women's basketball team =

American college basketball season

2024–25 Southern Illinois Salukis women's basketball
- Conference: Missouri Valley Conference
- Record: 4–26 (2–18 MVC)
- Head coach: Kelly Bond-White (3rd season)
- Associate head coach: Chester Nichols
- Assistant coaches: Marissa Webb; Cartaesha Macklin; Greg Brown
- Home arena: Banterra Center

2024–25 Missouri Valley Conference women's basketball standings
	Conf.				Overall
Team	W		L	PCT	W		L	PCT
Murray State †	16	–	4	.800	25	–	8	.758
Missouri State	16	–	4	.800	26	–	9	.743
Belmont	15	–	5	.750	26	–	13	.667
Drake	15	–	5	.750	22	–	12	.647
Illinois State	14	–	6	.700	24	–	13	.649
Northern Iowa	11	–	9	.550	17	–	17	.500
UIC	10	–	10	.500	15	–	18	.455
Valparaiso	9	–	11	.450	13	–	19	.406
Bradley	7	–	13	.350	14	–	19	.424
Evansville	3	–	17	.150	7	–	25	.219
Southern Illinois	2	–	18	.100	4	–	26	.133
Indiana State	2	–	18	.100	4	–	28	.125
† 2025 MVC tournament winner

The 2024–25 Southern Illinois Salukis women's basketball team represented Southern Illinois University Carbondale during the 2024–25 NCAA Division I women's basketball season. The Salukis, who were led by third-year head coach Kelly Bond-White, played their home games at the Banterra Center in Carbondale, Illinois as members of the Missouri Valley Conference (MVC).

The Salukis finished the season 4–26, 2–18 in MVC play, to finish in a tie for eleventh place. Their season ended after a 40-point loss to Illinois State in the first round of the MVC tournament.

== Previous season ==
The Salukis finished the 2023–24 season 11–20, 6–14 in MVC play, to finish in a tie for eighth place. They were defeated by Indiana State in the opening round of the MVC tournament.

== Preseason ==
On October 1, 2024, the MVC released their preseason coaches poll. Southern Illinois was picked to finish tenth in the MVC regular season.

=== Preseason rankings ===
MVC preseason poll
Predicted finish	Team	Votes (1st place)
1	Drake	566 (39)
2	Northern Iowa	504 (6)
3	Belmont	475 (3)
4	Murray State	391
5	Missouri State	380
6	UIC	347
7	Illinois State	341
8	Valparaiso	193
9	Indiana State	189
10	Southern Illinois	167
11	Bradley	97
12	Evansville	96

=== Preseason All-MVC Teams ===
No Salukis were named to the Preseason All-MVC First or Second teams.

== Roster ==
2024–25 Southern Illinois Salukis women's basketball team
Players
Coaches

Pos.	#	Name	Height	Year	Previous school	Hometown
G	1	Tyranny Brown	5 ft 8 in (1.73 m)	Sr	Heritage Christian School	Indianapolis, IN
F	3	Isabella Palmqvist	6 ft 1 in (1.85 m)	Fr	Falkonergårdens Gymnasium	Copenhagen, Denmark
G	6	Ternadoo Agatha Agba	5 ft 9 in (1.75 m)	Fr	St. Emma's Comprehensive High School	Lagos, Nigeria
G	8	Kelowna Ngoyi	5 ft 10 in (1.78 m)	Fr	Cégep de Saint-Jean-sur-Richelieu	Montreal, QC
C	10	Mia Gaines	6 ft 4 in (1.93 m)	Fr	Hyde Park High School	Chicago, IL
G	11	Kayla Cooper	5 ft 9 in (1.75 m)	So	Oklahoma	Plano, TX
G	14	Ariana Peagler	5 ft 7 in (1.7 m)	Fr	Hoover High School	Hoover, AL
F	15	Gift Uchenna	6 ft 3 in (1.91 m)	Jr	Shih Hsin	Ebonyi State, Nigeria
G	20	Alice Curman	5 ft 9 in (1.75 m)	Fr	Bromma Gymnasium	Stockholm, Sweden
G	23	Tkiyah Nelson	5 ft 10 in (1.78 m)	So	Whitfield School	St. Louis, MO
C	25	Angela Samuel	6 ft 2 in (1.88 m)	So	St. Emma Comprehensive College	Lagos, Nigeria
G	33	Karris Allen	6 ft 0 in (1.83 m)	Jr	Western Kentucky	Sikeston, MO
G	40	Se'Quoia Allmond	5 ft 5 in (1.65 m)	Sr	Loyola Marymount	South Memphis, TN
G	45	Jeniah Thompson	5 ft 10 in (1.78 m)	GS	Wichita State	Carterville, IL

Head coach

- Kelly Bond-White (Illinois)

Assistant coach(es)

- Chester Nichols (Greenville)
- Marissa Webb (Western Illinois)
- Cartaesha Macklin (Southern Illinois)
- Greg Brown (Lipscomb)

Legend

- (C) Team captain
- (S) Suspended
- (I) Ineligible
- (W) Walk-on
- Injured
- Current redshirt

Roster
Last update: April 5, 2025

== Schedule and results ==
Date time, TV	Rank^{#}	Opponent^{#}	Result	Record	Site (attendance) city, state
Non-conference regular season
November 4, 2024*; 6:00 p.m., SECN+		at Auburn	L 31–65	0–1	Neville Arena (2,564); Auburn, AL
November 10, 2024*; 2:00 p.m., ESPN+		Eastern Kentucky	L 49–70	0–2	Banterra Center (483); Carbondale, IL
November 13, 2024*; 6:00 p.m., ESPN+		Louisiana–Monroe	L 66–79	0–3	Banterra Center; Carbondale, IL
November 16, 2024*; 4:00 p.m., ESPN+		at IU Indy	W 85–80	1–3	The Jungle (531); Indianapolis, IN
November 25, 2024*; 6:30 p.m., ESPN+		at Southeast Missouri State	L 58–70	1–4	Show Me Center (580); Cape Girardeau, MO
December 2, 2024*; 11:00 a.m., ESPN+		Central Methodist	W 74–38	2–4	Banterra Center (4,849); Carbondale, IL
December 7, 2024*; 2:00 p.m., ESPN+		at North Texas	L 54–87	2–5	The Super Pit (1,673); Denton, TX
December 15, 2024*; 3:30 p.m., ESPN+		at SIU Edwardsville	L 59–71	2–6	First Community Arena (727); Edwardsville, IL
December 22, 2024*; 12:00 p.m., ESPN+		UAB	L 57–75	2–7	Banterra Center; Carbondale, IL
MVC regular season
December 29, 2024; 1:00 p.m., ESPN+		at Valparaiso	L 51–69	2–8 (0–1)	Athletics–Recreation Center (272); Valparaiso, IN
January 2, 2025; 6:00 p.m., ESPN+		Murray State	L 69–93	2–9 (0–2)	Banterra Center (424); Carbondale, IL
January 4, 2025; 2:00 p.m., ESPN+		Belmont	L 66–79	2–10 (0–3)	Banterra Center (302); Carbondale, IL
January 12, 2025; 2:00 p.m., ESPN+		at Missouri State	L 37–75	2–11 (0–4)	Great Southern Bank Arena (2,528); Springfield, MO
January 16, 2025; 6:00 p.m., ESPN+		at Indiana State	W 63–58	3–11 (1–4)	Hulman Center (1,163); Terre Haute, IN
January 19, 2025; 1:00 p.m., ESPN+		at Evansville	L 70–85	3–12 (1–5)	Meeks Family Fieldhouse (410); Evansville, IN
January 24, 2025; 6:00 p.m., ESPN+		Northern Iowa	L 59–84	3–13 (1–6)	Banterra Center (402); Carbondale, IL
January 26, 2025; 2:00 p.m., ESPN+		Drake	L 66–93	3–14 (1–7)	Banterra Center (377); Carbondale, IL
January 31, 2025; 6:30 p.m., ESPN+		at Illinois State	L 60–78	3–15 (1–8)	CEFCU Arena (1,589); Normal, IL
February 2, 2025; 2:00 p.m., ESPN+		at Bradley	L 46–68	3–16 (1–9)	Renaissance Coliseum (513); Peoria, IL
February 7, 2025; 6:00 p.m., ESPN+		Evansville	W 72–69	4–16 (2–9)	Banterra Center (343); Carbondale, IL
February 9, 2025; 12:00 p.m., ESPN+		Indiana State	L 63–87	4–17 (2–10)	Banterra Center (336); Carbondale, IL
February 13, 2025; 6:00 p.m., ESPN+		Missouri State	L 48–83	4–18 (2–11)	Banterra Center (305); Carbondale, IL
February 16, 2025; 2:00 p.m., ESPN+		UIC	L 46–62	4–19 (2–12)	Banterra Center (451); Carbondale, IL
February 20, 2025; 6:00 p.m., ESPN+		at Drake	L 40–82	4–20 (2–13)	Knapp Center (2,421); Des Moines, IA
February 22, 2025; 2:00 p.m., ESPN+		at Northern Iowa	L 51–87	4–21 (2–14)	McLeod Center (2,828); Cedar Falls, IA
February 27, 2025; 6:30 p.m., ESPN+		at Belmont	L 43–73	4–22 (2–15)	Curb Event Center (407); Nashville, TN
March 1, 2025; 2:00 p.m., ESPN+		at Murray State	L 64–87	4–23 (2–16)	CFSB Center (2,347); Murray, KY
March 6, 2025; 6:00 p.m., ESPN+		Bradley	L 51–59	4–24 (2–17)	Banterra Center (261); Carbondale, IL
March 8, 2025; 2:00 p.m., ESPN+		Illinois State	L 86–99	4–25 (2–18)	Banterra Center (324); Carbondale, IL
MVC tournament
March 13, 2025; 2:30 p.m., ESPN+	(12)	vs. (5) Illinois State; First round	L 48–88	4–26	Ford Center (708); Evansville, IN
*Non-conference game. ^{#}Rankings from AP poll. (#) Tournament seedings in parentheses. All times are in Central.
