= 2024–25 Indiana State Sycamores women's basketball team =

American college basketball season

2024–25 Indiana State Sycamores women's basketball
- Conference: Missouri Valley Conference
- Record: 4–28 (2–18 MVC)
- Head coach: Marc Mitchell (1st season)
- Associate head coach: Jason Pruitt
- Assistant coaches: Krystle Evans; Ashley Yu
- Home arena: Hulman Center

2024–25 Missouri Valley Conference women's basketball standings
	Conf.				Overall
Team	W		L	PCT	W		L	PCT
Murray State †	16	–	4	.800	25	–	8	.758
Missouri State	16	–	4	.800	26	–	9	.743
Belmont	15	–	5	.750	26	–	13	.667
Drake	15	–	5	.750	22	–	12	.647
Illinois State	14	–	6	.700	24	–	13	.649
Northern Iowa	11	–	9	.550	17	–	17	.500
UIC	10	–	10	.500	15	–	18	.455
Valparaiso	9	–	11	.450	13	–	19	.406
Bradley	7	–	13	.350	14	–	19	.424
Evansville	3	–	17	.150	7	–	25	.219
Southern Illinois	2	–	18	.100	4	–	26	.133
Indiana State	2	–	18	.100	4	–	28	.125
† 2025 MVC tournament winner

The 2024–25 Indiana State Sycamores women's basketball team represented Indiana State University during the 2024–25 NCAA Division I women's basketball season. The Sycamores, who were led by first-year head coach Marc Mitchell, played their home games at the Hulman Center in Terre Haute, Indiana as members of the Missouri Valley Conference.

== Previous season ==
The Sycamores finished the 2023–24 season 11–21, 6–14 in MVC play, to finish in a tie for eighth place. They defeated Southern Illinois, before falling to top-seeded and eventual tournament champions Drake in the quarterfinals of the MVC tournament.

On April 24, 2024, head coach Chad Killinger announced that he would be stepping down as head coach after three seasons, after missing a majority of the season due to an undisclosed health issue. On May 10, UIndy head coach Marc Mitchell announced that he would be stepping down from his head coaching position, in order to take the head coaching position at Indiana State.

== Preseason ==
On October 1, 2024, the MVC released their preseason coaches poll. Indiana State was picked to finish ninth in the MVC regular season.

=== Preseason rankings ===
MVC preseason poll
Predicted finish	Team	Votes (1st place)
1	Drake	566 (39)
2	Northern Iowa	504 (6)
3	Belmont	475 (3)
4	Murray State	391
5	Missouri State	380
6	UIC	347
7	Illinois State	341
8	Valparaiso	193
9	Indiana State	189
10	Southern Illinois	167
11	Bradley	97
12	Evansville	96

=== Preseason All-MVC Teams ===
No Sycamores were named to the Preseason All-MVC First or Second teams.

== Roster ==
2024–25 Indiana State Sycamores women's basketball team
Players
Coaches

Pos.	#	Name	Height	Year	Previous school	Hometown
G	00	Queen Ruffin	5 ft 6 in (1.68 m)	So	Johnson C. Smith	Moreno Valley, California
F	2	Savannah White	6 ft 2 in (1.88 m)	Jr	Wisconsin	Saint Paul, Minnesota
F	3	Zalissa Finley	6 ft 2 in (1.88 m)	So	Whitworth	Inchelium, Washington
G	4	Mia Simpson	5 ft 8 in (1.73 m)	Jr	Morton College	Waukegan, Illinois
G/F	5	Davina Smith	6 ft 0 in (1.83 m)	Jr	IU East	Merrillville, Indiana
G	8	Semie Brar	5 ft 4 in (1.63 m)	Sr	Wagner	Fresno, California
G	10	Deja Jones	5 ft 9 in (1.75 m)	Sr	Cochise College	San Antonio, Texas
G	12	Keslyn Secrist	5 ft 10 in (1.78 m)	So	Pulaski County High School	Draper, Virginia
F	13	Saige Stahl	6 ft 1 in (1.85 m)	So	Columbus East High School	Seymour, Indiana
F	14	Leah Yarbrough	6 ft 0 in (1.83 m)	Sr	UIC	Indianapolis, Indiana
F	23	Chloe Williams	6 ft 3 in (1.91 m)	Jr	Tulsa	Los Angeles, California
C	31	Lily Niebuhr	6 ft 3 in (1.91 m)	Jr	Chaska High School	Jordan, Minnesota
G	33	Bella Finnegan	6 ft 0 in (1.83 m)	Jr	Mother McAuley High School	Hometown, Illinois

Head coach

- Marc Mitchell (Kean)

Assistant coach(es)

- Jason Pruitt (Kentucky State)
- Krystle Evans (UCLA)
- Ashley Yu (Hunter)

Legend

- (C) Team captain
- (S) Suspended
- (I) Ineligible
- (W) Walk-on
- Injured
- Current redshirt

Roster
Last update: April 5, 2025

== Schedule and results ==
Date time, TV	Rank^{#}	Opponent^{#}	Result	Record	Site (attendance) city, state
Non-conference regular season
November 4, 2024*; 7:00 pm, ESPN+		Western Kentucky	L 59–71	0–1	Hulman Center (1,113); Terre Haute, IN
November 7, 2024*; 7:30 pm, ESPN+		at No. 8 Iowa State	L 42–64	0–2	Hilton Coliseum (9,992); Ames, IA
November 12, 2024*; 7:00 pm, ESPN+		at Wright State	W 68–51	1–2	Nutter Center (1,077); Fairborn, OH
November 15, 2024*; 7:00 pm, ESPN+		Austin Peay	L 56–74	1–3	Hulman Center (1,140); Terre Haute, IN
November 20, 2024*; 7:00 pm, FloHoops		at Butler	L 55–80	1–4	Hinkle Fieldhouse (877); Indianapolis, IN
November 30, 2024*; 6:15 pm, ESPN+		at Southeast Missouri State	W 68–65	2–4	Show Me Center (625); Cape Girardeau, MO
December 3, 2024*; 7:30 pm, FloHoops		at Marquette	L 67–83	2–5	Al McGuire Center (1,166); Milwaukee, WI
December 6, 2024*; 6:00 pm, ESPN+		at Eastern Illinois	L 60–73	2–6	Groniger Arena (505); Charleston, IL
December 15, 2024*; 2:00 pm		vs. Northern Illinois; Eastern Kentucky MTE	L 78–82	2–7	Clive M. Beck Center (101); Lexington, KY
December 16, 2024*; 2:00 pm, ESPN+		at Eastern Kentucky; Eastern Kentucky MTE	L 72–89	2–8	Clive M. Beck Center (112); Lexington, KY
December 21, 2024*; 2:00 pm, B1G+		at Purdue	L 68–87	2–9	Mackey Arena (3,803); West Lafayette, IN
MVC regular season
December 29, 2024; 2:00 pm, ESPN+		Northern Iowa	L 65–75	2–10 (0–1)	Hulman Center (1,204); Terre Haute, IN
January 2, 2025; 7:30 pm, ESPN+		at Illinois State	L 69–96	2–11 (0–2)	CEFCU Arena (1,596); Normal, IL
January 5, 2025; 3:00 pm, ESPN+		at Bradley	L 52–65	2–12 (0–3)	Renaissance Coliseum (531); Peoria, IL
January 12, 2025; 2:00 pm, ESPN+		Evansville	W 90–74	3–12 (1–3)	Hulman Center (1,472); Terre Haute, IN
January 16, 2025; 7:00 pm, ESPN+		Southern Illinois	L 58–63	3–13 (1–4)	Hulman Center (1,163); Terre Haute, IN
January 19, 2025; 2:00 pm, ESPN+		Missouri State	L 57–73	3–14 (1–5)	Hulman Center (1,262); Terre Haute, IN
January 24, 2025; 7:00 pm, ESPN+		at Murray State	L 71–97	3–15 (1–6)	CFSB Center; Murray, KY
January 26, 2025; 3:00 pm, ESPN+		at Belmont	L 58–88	3–16 (1–7)	Curb Event Center (876); Nashville, TN
January 30, 2025; 7:00 pm, ESPN+		Valparaiso	L 54–73	3–17 (1–8)	Hulman Center (1,201); Terre Haute, IN
February 1, 2025; 2:00 pm, ESPN+		UIC	L 53–58	3–18 (1–9)	Hulman Center (1,278); Terre Haute, IN
February 7, 2025; 7:30 pm, ESPN+		at Missouri State	L 61–76	3–19 (1–10)	Great Southern Bank Arena (2,091); Springfield, MO
February 9, 2025; 1:00 pm, ESPN+		at Southern Illinois	W 87–63	4–19 (2–10)	Banterra Center (336); Carbondale, IL
February 13, 2025; 7:00 pm, ESPN+		Illinois State	L 77–85	4–20 (2–11)	Hulman Center (1,110); Terre Haute, IN
February 16, 2025; 2:00 pm, ESPN+		Bradley	L 54–56	4–21 (2–12)	Hulman Center (1,090); Terre Haute, IN
February 21, 2025; 12:00 pm, ESPN+		at UIC	L 71–94	4–22 (2–13)	Credit Union 1 Arena (3,025); Chicago, IL
February 23, 2025; 2:00 pm, ESPN+		at Valparaiso	L 68–73	4–23 (2–14)	Athletics–Recreation Center (325); Valparaiso, IN
February 27, 2025; 7:00 pm, ESPN+		at Drake	L 86–107	4–24 (2–15)	Knapp Center (2,492); Des Moines, IA
March 1, 2025; 6:00 pm, ESPN+		at Evansville	L 68–79	4–25 (2–16)	Meeks Family Fieldhouse (526); Evansville, IN
March 6, 2025; 7:00 pm, ESPN+		Belmont	L 69–90	4–26 (2–17)	Hulman Center (1,121); Terre Haute, IN
March 8, 2025; 2:00 pm, ESPN+		Murray State	L 70–109	4–27 (2–18)	Hulman Center (1,227); Terre Haute, IN
MVC tournament
March 13, 2025; 9:30 pm, ESPN+	(11)	vs. (6) Northern Iowa; Opening round	L 73–87	4–28	Ford Center (822); Evansville, IN
*Non-conference game. ^{#}Rankings from AP Poll. (#) Tournament seedings in parentheses. All times are in Eastern.
