= 2024–25 Belmont Bruins women's basketball team =

American college basketball season

2024–25 Belmont Bruins women's basketball

WBIT, Runner-Up
- Conference: Missouri Valley Conference
- Record: 26–13 (15–5 MVC)
- Head coach: Bart Brooks (8th season)
- Associate head coach: Jamey Givens
- Assistant coaches: Amy Malo; Jessica Holman; Nyla Johnson
- Home arena: Curb Event Center

2024–25 Missouri Valley Conference women's basketball standings
	Conf.				Overall
Team	W		L	PCT	W		L	PCT
Murray State †	16	–	4	.800	25	–	8	.758
Missouri State	16	–	4	.800	26	–	9	.743
Belmont	15	–	5	.750	26	–	13	.667
Drake	15	–	5	.750	22	–	12	.647
Illinois State	14	–	6	.700	24	–	13	.649
Northern Iowa	11	–	9	.550	17	–	17	.500
UIC	10	–	10	.500	15	–	18	.455
Valparaiso	9	–	11	.450	13	–	19	.406
Bradley	7	–	13	.350	14	–	19	.424
Evansville	3	–	17	.150	7	–	25	.219
Southern Illinois	2	–	18	.100	4	–	26	.133
Indiana State	2	–	18	.100	4	–	28	.125
† 2025 MVC tournament winner

The 2024–25 Belmont Bruins women's basketball team represented Belmont University during the 2024–25 NCAA Division I women's basketball season. The Bruins, led by eighth-year head coach Bart Brooks, played their home games at the Curb Event Center in Nashville, Tennessee as members of the Missouri Valley Conference.

== Previous season ==
The Bruins finished the 2023–24 season 26–8, 17–3 in MVC play, to finish in second place. They defeated UIC, before falling to Missouri State in the semifinals of the MVC tournament. They received an at-large bid to the WBIT, where they defeated Ball State in the first round, before falling to Penn State in the second round.

== Preseason ==
On October 1, 2024, the MVC released their preseason coaches poll. Belmont was picked to finish third in the MVC regular season.

=== Preseason rankings ===
MVC preseason poll
Predicted finish	Team	Votes (1st place)
1	Drake	566 (39)
2	Northern Iowa	504 (6)
3	Belmont	475 (3)
4	Murray State	391
5	Missouri State	380
6	UIC	347
7	Illinois State	341
8	Valparaiso	193
9	Indiana State	189
10	Southern Illinois	167
11	Bradley	97
12	Evansville	96

=== Preseason All-MVC teams ===
Preseason All-MVC team
Team	Player	Position	Year
Second	Jailyn Banks	Guard	Sophomore
Second	Kendal Cheesman	Forward	Senior
Second	Tuti Jones	Guard	Graduate student

== Roster ==
2024–25 Belmont Bruins women's basketball team
Players
Coaches

Pos.	#	Name	Height	Year	Previous school	Hometown
G	0	Tuti Jones	5 ft 7 in (1.7 m)	GS	Charles Henderson High School	Troy, Alabama
G	1	Kensley Feltner	5 ft 11 in (1.8 m)	So	Lawrence County High School	Louisa, Kentucky
G	4	Liz Suder	5 ft 8 in (1.73 m)	Sr	Riverside High School	Leesburg, Virginia
G	5	Sanaa Tripp	5 ft 8 in (1.73 m)	Fr	Newton High School	Covington, Georgia
F	9	Hilary Fuller	6 ft 2 in (1.88 m)	Fr	All Hallows' School	Brisbane, Australia
G	13	Claire Hyde	5 ft 6 in (1.68 m)	Jr	Morton College	Wheaton, Illinois
F	14	Kendal Cheesman	6 ft 2 in (1.88 m)	Sr	Vanderbilt	Tampa, Florida
G	20	Jacee Busick	6 ft 1 in (1.85 m)	GS	Charlotte	Kernersville, North Carolina
G	21	Emily La Chapell	5 ft 11 in (1.8 m)	Jr	Marquette	Appleton, Wisconsin
G	22	Quinn Eubank	6 ft 0 in (1.83 m)	Fr	Ryle High School	Union, Kentucky
G	23	Jailyn Banks	5 ft 9 in (1.75 m)	So	Middle Tennessee Christian School	Spring Hill, Tennessee
F	33	Carmyn Harrison	6 ft 2 in (1.88 m)	Sr	Georgia Tech	Memphis, Tennessee
G	35	Kendall Holmes	5 ft 10 in (1.78 m)	GS	South Dakota	Plainfield, Illinois

Head coach

- Bart Brooks (Wyoming)

Assistant coach(es)

- Jamey Givens (Florida State)
- Amy Malo (Vanderbilt)
- Jessica Holman (Vanderbilt)
- Nyla Johnson (Faulkner)

Legend

- (C) Team captain
- (S) Suspended
- (I) Ineligible
- (W) Walk-on
- Injured
- Current redshirt

Roster
Last update: March 27, 2025

== Schedule and results ==
Date time, TV	Rank^{#}	Opponent^{#}	Result	Record	Site (attendance) city, state
Non-conference regular season
November 7, 2024*; 6:30 pm, ESPN+		at No. 13 Kansas State	L 56–82	0–1	Bramlage Coliseum (3,452); Manhattan, KS
November 9, 2024*; 2:00 pm, ESPN+		at Wichita State	W 75–55	1–1	Charles Koch Arena (1,187); Wichita, KS
November 14, 2024*; 6:30 pm, ESPN+		Kennesaw State	W 75–47	2–1	Curb Event Center (756); Nashville, TN
November 17, 2024*; 2:00 pm, ESPN+		No. 12 Ohio State	L 63–67	2–2	Curb Event Center (1,814); Nashville, TN
November 21, 2024*; 6:00 pm, ACCN		at No. 14 Duke	L 47–79	2–3	Cameron Indoor Stadium (2,147); Durham, NC
November 29, 2024*; 1:00 pm, WSN		vs. Michigan; Fort Myers Tip-Off Shell Division semifinals	L 58–68	2–4	Suncoast Credit Union Arena (787); Fort Myers, FL
November 30, 2024*; 4:00 pm, WSN		vs. Davidson; Fort Myers Tip-Off Shell Division consolation	W 69–59	3–4	Suncoast Credit Union Arena (573); Fort Myers, FL
December 4, 2024*; 6:00 pm, ESPN+		at Lipscomb; Battle of the Boulevard	W 63–55	4–4	Allen Arena (325); Nashville, TN
December 7, 2024*; 12:00 pm, ESPN+		Middle Tennessee	W 65–52	5–4	Curb Event Center (1,219); Nashville, TN
December 14, 2024*; 2:00 pm, SECN+		vs. Mississippi State	L 70–73	5–5	Cadence Bank Arena; Tupelo, MS
December 20, 2024*; 5:00 pm, SECN+		at No. 16 Kentucky	L 78–84	5–6	Memorial Coliseum (3,887); Lexington, KY
MVC regular season
December 29, 2024; 2:00 pm, ESPN+		Bradley	W 69–61	6–6 (1–0)	Curb Event Center (1,005); Nashville, TN
January 2, 2025; 6:30 pm, ESPN+		at Missouri State	L 55–57	6–7 (1–1)	Great Southern Bank Arena (2,093); Springfield, MO
January 4, 2025; 2:00 pm, ESPN+		at Southern Illinois	W 79–66	7–7 (2–1)	Banterra Center (302); Carbondale, IL
January 10, 2025; 2:00 pm, ESPN+		UIC	W 67–52	8–7 (3–1)	Curb Event Center (514); Nashville, TN
January 12, 2025; 2:00 pm, ESPN+		Valparaiso	W 67–53	9–7 (4–1)	Curb Event Center (1,012); Nashville, TN
January 16, 2025; 6:00 pm, ESPN+		at Drake	W 80–65	10–7 (5–1)	Knapp Center (2,874); Des Moines, IA
January 18, 2025; 2:00 pm, ESPN+		at Northern Iowa	W 74–60	11–7 (6–1)	McLeod Center (2,621); Cedar Falls, IA
January 24, 2025; 6:30 pm, ESPN+		Evansville	W 90–65	12–7 (7–1)	Curb Event Center (933); Nashville, TN
January 26, 2025; 2:00 pm, ESPN+		Indiana State	W 88–58	13–7 (8–1)	Curb Event Center (876); Nashville, TN
February 1, 2025; 4:00 pm, ESPN+		Murray State	W 96–89	14–7 (9–1)	Curb Event Center (1,087); Nashville, TN
February 7, 2025; 6:00 pm, ESPN+		at Valparaiso	W 69–41	15–7 (10–1)	Athletics–Recreation Center (272); Valparaiso, IN
February 9, 2025; 1:00 pm, ESPN+		at UIC	W 64–55	16–7 (11–1)	Credit Union 1 Arena (684); Chicago, IL
February 13, 2025; 6:00 pm, Gray Media/ESPN+		Northern Iowa	L 61–73	16–8 (11–2)	Curb Event Center (729); Nashville, TN
February 15, 2025; 4:00 pm, ESPN+		Drake	L 83–88	16–9 (11–3)	Curb Event Center (835); Nashville, TN
February 20, 2025; 6:30 pm, ESPN+		at Illinois State	L 63–66	16–10 (11–4)	CEFCU Arena (2,489); Normal, IL
February 23, 2025; 2:00 pm, ESPN+		at Murray State	L 78–83	16–11 (11–5)	CFSB Center (2,196); Murray, KY
February 27, 2025; 6:30 pm, ESPN+		Southern Illinois	W 73–43	17–11 (12–5)	Curb Event Center (407); Nashville, TN
March 1, 2025; 4:00 pm, ESPN+		Missouri State	W 67–61	18–11 (13–5)	Curb Event Center (1,031); Nashville, TN
March 6, 2025; 6:00 pm, ESPN+		at Indiana State	W 90–69	19–11 (14–5)	Hulman Center (1,121); Terre Haute, IN
March 8, 2025; 2:00 pm, ESPN+		at Evansville	W 75–48	20–11 (15–5)	Meeks Family Fieldhouse (315); Evansville, IN
MVC tournament
March 14, 2025; 8:30 pm, ESPN+	(3)	vs. (6) Northern Iowa; Quarterfinals	W 64–46	21–11	Ford Center (927); Evansville, IN
March 15, 2025; 4:00 pm, ESPN+	(3)	vs. (2) Missouri State; Semifinals	W 76–67	22–11	Ford Center (1,566); Evansville, IN
March 16, 2025; 1:00 pm, ESPN2	(3)	vs. (1) Murray State; Championship	L 62–83	22–12	Ford Center (1,503); Evansville, IN
WBIT
March 20, 2025*; 6:30 pm, ESPN+	(3)	Middle Tennessee; First Round	W 64–51	23–12	Curb Event Center (1,009); Nashville, TN
March 23, 2025*; 2:00 pm, ESPN+	(3)	Northern Arizona; Second Round	W 81–80	24–12	Curb Event Center (822); Nashville, TN
March 27, 2025*; 6:00 pm, ESPN+	(3)	at (1) James Madison; Quarterfinals	W 90–45	25–12	Atlantic Union Bank Center (1,645); Harrisonburg, VA
March 31, 2025*; 1:30 pm, ESPNU	(3)	vs. (4) Villanova; Semifinals	W 66–57	26–12	Hinkle Fieldhouse; Indianapolis, IN
April 2, 2025*; 5:00 pm, ESPN2	(3)	vs. (2) Minnesota; Championship	L 63–75	26–13	Hinkle Fieldhouse (1,595); Indianapolis, IN
*Non-conference game. ^{#}Rankings from AP Poll. (#) Tournament seedings in parentheses. All times are in Central.
