= 2024–25 Saint Louis Billikens women's basketball team =

American college basketball season

2024–25 Saint Louis Billikens women's basketball
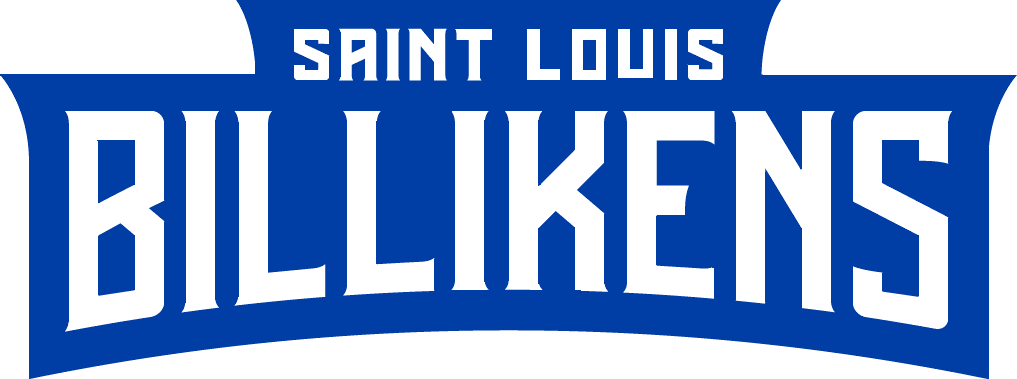
- Conference: Atlantic 10 Conference
- Record: 13–17 (7–10 A–10)
- Head coach: Rebecca Tillett (3rd season)
- Associate head coach: Jimmy Colloton
- Assistant coaches: Kelsey Johnson; Tra'Dayja Smith
- Home arena: Chaifetz Arena

2024–25 Atlantic 10 women's basketball standings
	Conf.				Overall
Team	W		L	PCT	W		L	PCT
Richmond	17	–	1	.944	28	–	7	.800
George Mason †	14	–	4	.778	27	–	6	.818
Davidson	13	–	5	.722	19	–	14	.576
Saint Joseph's	12	–	6	.667	24	–	10	.706
Rhode Island	11	–	7	.611	17	–	16	.515
Dayton	11	–	7	.611	18	–	13	.581
UMass	11	–	7	.611	17	–	15	.531
Fordham	9	–	9	.500	15	–	15	.500
Duquesne	9	–	9	.500	21	–	13	.618
Saint Louis	7	–	11	.389	15	–	19	.441
VCU	6	–	12	.333	12	–	19	.387
George Washington	5	–	13	.278	13	–	18	.419
Loyola Chicago	5	–	13	.278	13	–	17	.433
La Salle	3	–	15	.167	10	–	23	.303
St. Bonaventure	2	–	16	.111	6	–	24	.200
† 2025 A10 tournament winner

The 2024–25 Saint Louis Billikens women's basketball team represented Saint Louis University during the 2024–25 NCAA Division I women's basketball season. The Billikens, led by third-year head coach Rebecca Tillett, played their home games at Chaifetz Arena in St. Louis, Missouri as members of the Atlantic 10 Conference.

== Previous season ==
The Billikens finished the 2023–24 season 22–18, 9–9 in A–10 play to finish in seventh place. They defeated George Washington, and VCU, before falling to Rhode Island in the semifinals of the A–10 tournament. They received an at-large bid to the WNIT, where they would defeat Central Arkansas, Northern Iowa, Purdue Fort Wayne, Wisconsin, Vermont, and Minnesota to win the WNIT championship, becoming the first A–10 team to ever win a postseason title.

== Roster ==
2024–25 Saint Louis Billikens women's basketball team
Players
Coaches

Pos.	#	Name	Height	Year	Previous school	Hometown
F	00	Mya Glanton	6 ft 0 in (1.83 m)	GS	Indiana State	East St. Louis, Illinois
G	1	Hannah Wallace	6 ft 0 in (1.83 m)	Fr	Cardinal Ritter Prep	St. Louis, Missouri
G	2	Shun'teria Anumele	5 ft 8 in (1.73 m)	Fr	Legacy Sports School of Sciences	Houston, Texas
G	4	Kennedy Calhoun	5 ft 5 in (1.65 m)	Sr	Longwood	Harrisburg, North Carolina
G	5	Brooklyn Gray	5 ft 11 in (1.8 m)	Jr	Wabash Valley College	Rockford, Illinois
G/F	7	Bri Johns	5 ft 11 in (1.8 m)	GS	Longwood	Alexandria, Virginia
G	10	Isabel Tillett	5 ft 10 in (1.78 m)	RS Jr	Longwood	Manassas, Virginia
F	12	Tierra Simon	6 ft 1 in (1.85 m)	Sr	Pearl River Community College	Houston, Texas
C	15	Marilena Triantafylli	6 ft 5 in (1.96 m)	So	Syracuse	Athens, Greece
F	21	Nafatoumata Haidara	6 ft 5 in (1.96 m)	GS	Chicago State	Bamako, Mali
C	25	Marcavia Shavers	6 ft 2 in (1.88 m)	Sr	Pearl River Community College	Biloxi, Mississippi
F	32	Peyton Kennedy	5 ft 11 in (1.8 m)	GS	Boylan Catholic High School	Rockford, Illinois
G	33	Mia Bergstrom	5 ft 10 in (1.78 m)	Fr	St. Viator High School	Mount Prospect, Illinois
G	44	Rita Nazário	5 ft 5 in (1.65 m)	Fr	CRC Quinta dos Lombos	Figueira da Foz, Portugal

Head coach

- Rebecca Tillett (William & Mary)

Assistant coach(es)

- Jimmy Colloton (Wittenberg)
- Kelsey Johnson (Bridgewater State)
- Tra'Dayja Smith (Longwood)

Legend

- (C) Team captain
- (S) Suspended
- (I) Ineligible
- (W) Walk-on
- Injured
- Current redshirt

Roster
Last update: January 5, 2025

== Schedule and results ==
Date time, TV	Rank^{#}	Opponent^{#}	Result	Record	High points	High rebounds	High assists	Site (attendance) city, state
Exhibition
October 22, 2024*; 6:00 pm		at SIU Edwardsville; Charity Exhibition	W 76–67	–	30 – Kennedy	11 – Simon	8 – Calhoun	First Community Arena (482); Edwardsville, IL
October 29, 2024*; 4:00 pm		Missouri S&T	W 65–44	–	20 – Anumele	7 – Kennedy	4 – Calhoun	Chaifetz Arena; St. Louis, MO
Non-conference regular season
November 4, 2024*; 5:30 pm, SLN		at South Dakota	W 85–83 ^{OT}	1–0	25 – Kennedy	13 – Simon	4 – Calhoun	Sanford Coyote Sports Center (1,953); Vermillion, SD
November 7, 2024*; 6:00 pm, ESPN+		at Drake	L 70–95	1–1	26 – Anumele	8 – Simon	4 – Calhoun	Knapp Center (2,173); Des Moines, IA
November 12, 2024*; 7:00 pm, ESPN+		Illinois State	W 78–71	2–1	17 – Kennedy	8 – Simon	5 – Calhoun	Chaifetz Arena (857); St. Louis, MO
November 17, 2024*; 2:00 pm, ESPN+		at Southern Indiana	L 59–71	2–2	23 – Kennedy	12 – Glanton	5 – Calhoun	Liberty Arena (1,009); Evansville, IN
November 20, 2024*; 6:30 pm, SECN+		at Missouri	L 59–112	2–3	14 – Kennedy	5 – Shavers	3 – Gray	Mizzou Arena (2,698); Columbia, MO
November 23, 2024*; 1:00 pm, ESPN+		Missouri State	L 68–91	2–4	25 – Gray	5 – Gray	4 – Gray	Chaifetz Arena (725); St. Louis, MO
November 26, 2024*; 8:00 pm, ESPN+		at California Baptist	W 82–70	3–4	24 – Gray	16 – Simon	4 – Tied	Fowler Events Center (461); Riverside, CA
November 29, 2024*; 6:00 pm, TruTV		vs. No. 6 USC; Acrisure Holiday Invitational	L 65–104	3–5	19 – Bergstrom	11 – Simon	3 – Tied	Acrisure Arena (2,725); Thousand Palms, CA
December 3, 2024*; 7:00 pm, ESPN+		Murray State	L 66–91	3–6	20 – Kennedy	10 – Simon	3 – Tied	Chaifetz Arena (317); St. Louis, MO
December 7, 2024*; 10:30 am		vs. Norfolk State; Coaches vs. Racism Roundball Classic	L 66–75	3–7	21 – Bergstrom	11 – Simon	6 – Calhoun	Entertainment and Sports Arena; Washington, D.C.
December 15, 2024*; 2:00 pm, ESPN+		Ohio	W 96–52	4–7	25 – Kennedy	12 – Simon	9 – Gray	Chaifetz Arena (625); St. Louis, MO
December 18, 2024*; 4:00 pm, ESPN+		Valparaiso	W 69–59	5–7	15 – Kennedy	14 – Simon	9 – Calhoun	Chaifetz Arena; St. Louis, MO
December 21, 2024*; 1:00 pm, ESPN+		Bellarmine	W 86–69	6–7	22 – Kennedy	17 – Simon	5 – Calhoun	Chaifetz Arena (526); St. Louis, MO
A–10 regular season
December 29, 2024; 12:00 pm, ESPN+		at Rhode Island	L 63–83	6–8 (0–1)	19 – Gray	5 – Simon	4 – Calhoun	Ryan Center (1,162); Kingston, RI
January 2, 2025; 7:00 pm, ESPN+		UMass	L 55–72	6–9 (0–2)	16 – Anumele	12 – Simon	4 – Calhoun	Chaifetz Arena (729); St. Louis, MO
January 5, 2025; 11:00 am, CBSSN		Davidson	L 53-94	6-10 (0-3)	17 – Simon	7 – Glanton	2 – Kennedy	Chaifetz Arena (126); St. Louis, MO
January 8, 2025; 5:00 pm, ESPN+		at St. Bonaventure	L 66-68	6-11 (0-4)	16 – Anumele	20 – Shavers	2 – Calhoun	Reilly Center (155); St. Bonaventure, NY
January 15, 2025; 7:00 pm, ESPN+		George Washington	W 64-63	7-11 (1-4)	17 – Glanton	9 – Simon	3 – Tillett	Chaifetz Arena (532); St. Louis, MO
January 18, 2025; 7:00 pm, ESPN+		Loyola Chicago	L 63-66	7-12 (1-5)	23 – Gray	10 – Simon	3 – Gray	Chaifetz Arena (904); St. Louis, MO
January 22, 2025; 6:00 pm, ESPN+		at Dayton	L 76-87	7-13 (1-6)	16 – Gray	7 – Calhoun	5 – Calhoun	UD Arena (1,286); Dayton, OH
January 26, 2025; 10:00 am, CBSSN		at Davidson	W 60-51	8-13 (2-6)	18 – Glanton	10 – Glanton	7 – Calhoun	John M. Belk Arena (831); Davidson, NC
January 29, 2025; 11:00 am, ESPN+		George Mason	L 53-80	8-14 (2-7)	12 – Anumele	10 – Shavers	2 – Calhoun	Chaifetz Arena (3,378); St. Louis, MO
February 1, 2025; 7:00 pm, ESPN+		Fordham						Chaifetz Arena; St. Louis, MO
February 5, 2025; 6:00 pm, ESPN+		at Saint Joseph's						Hagan Arena; Philadelphia, PA
February 8, 2025; 7:00 pm, ESPN+		La Salle						Chaifetz Arena; St. Louis, MO
February 13, 2025; 10:00 am, ESPN+		at VCU						Siegel Center; Richmond, VA
February 16, 2025; 1:00 pm, ESPN+		at Richmond						Robins Center; Richmond, VA
February 19, 2025; 7:00 pm, ESPN+		Dayton						Chaifetz Arena; St. Louis, MO
February 22, 2025; 1:00 pm, ESPN+		at Duquesne	L 72−84	12−17 (6−10)	19 – Kennedy	9 – Simon	4 – Calhoun	UPMC Cooper Fieldhouse (1,268); Pittsburgh, PA
February 26, 2025; 7:00 pm, ESPN+		Rhode Island	W 67−63	13−17 (7−10)	22 – Gray	11 – Simon	6 – Calhoun	Chaifetz Arena (913); St. Louis, MO
March 1, 2025; 2:00 pm, ESPN+		at Loyola Chicago						Joseph J. Gentile Arena; Chicago, IL
A-10 tournament
March 5, 2025; 1:30 pm, ESPN+	(10)	vs. (15) St. Bonaventure; First round	W 60–50	14–18	20 – Calhoun	6 – Tied	3 – Kennedy	Henrico Sports & Events Center; Henrico, VA
March 6, 2025; 4:00 pm, ESPN+	(10)	vs. (7) UMass; Second round	W 67–57	15–18	30 – Gray	11 – Simon	4 – Calhoun	Henrico Sports & Events Center; Henrico, VA
March 7, 2025; 5:00 pm, Peacock	(10)	vs. (2) George Mason; Quarterfinals						Henrico Sports & Events Center; Henrico, VA
*Non-conference game. ^{#}Rankings from AP Poll. (#) Tournament seedings in parentheses. All times are in Central.
