= 2025 Missouri Valley Conference women's basketball tournament =

American college basketball postseason tournament

- Classification: Division I
- Season: 2024–25
- Teams: 12
- Site: Ford Center; Evansville, Indiana
- Champions: Murray State (1st title)
- Winning coach: Rechelle Turner (1st title)
- MVP: Katelyn Young (Murray State)
- Television: ESPN+, ESPN2

2024–25 Missouri Valley Conference women's basketball standings
	Conf.				Overall
Team	W		L	PCT	W		L	PCT
Murray State †	16	–	4	.800	25	–	8	.758
Missouri State	16	–	4	.800	26	–	9	.743
Belmont	15	–	5	.750	26	–	13	.667
Drake	15	–	5	.750	22	–	12	.647
Illinois State	14	–	6	.700	24	–	13	.649
Northern Iowa	11	–	9	.550	17	–	17	.500
UIC	10	–	10	.500	15	–	18	.455
Valparaiso	9	–	11	.450	13	–	19	.406
Bradley	7	–	13	.350	14	–	19	.424
Evansville	3	–	17	.150	7	–	25	.219
Southern Illinois	2	–	18	.100	4	–	26	.133
Indiana State	2	–	18	.100	4	–	28	.125
† 2025 MVC tournament winner

The 2025 Missouri Valley Conference Women's Basketball Tournament, was a postseason women's basketball tournament which completed the 2024–25 season in the Missouri Valley Conference. The tournament was held at the Ford Center in Evansville, Indiana from March 13-16, 2025.

== Seeds ==
Teams are seeded by conference record.

Two-way ties are broken by utilizing head-to-head record; should a tie still remain, the NCAA Evaluation Tool (NET) rankings the day following all conference teams having completed their regular season will be used.

Three (or more) way ties are broken by first determining the cumulative record for each tied team versus the other teams with the same conference record. Should any teams still remain tied (and there are more than two), the cumulative record would again be used on those remaining teams; should any teams still remain (and there are only two), the two-way approach would be leveraged.

The top four seeds receive opening-round byes.

Seed	School	Conference Record	Tiebreaker
1	Murray State	16–4	NET: 56
2	Missouri State	16–4	NET: 66
3	Belmont	15–5	NET: 61
4	Drake	15–5	NET: 68
5	Illinois State	14–6	
6	Northern Iowa	11–9	
7	UIC	10–10	
8	Valparaiso	9–11	
9	Bradley	7–13	
10	Evansville	3–17	
11	Indiana State	2–18	NET: 287
12	Southern Illinois	2–18	NET: 338

== Schedule ==
Game	Time *	Matchup	Score	Television
Opening Round – Thursday, March 13
1	12:00 pm	No. 8 Valparaiso vs. No. 9 Bradley	58–64	ESPN+
2	2:30 pm	No. 5 Illinois State vs. No. 12 Southern Illinois	88–48	ESPN+
3	6:00 pm	No. 7 UIC vs. No. 10 Evansville	72–62	ESPN+
4	8:30 pm	No. 6 Northern Iowa vs. No. 11 Indiana State	87–73	ESPN+
Quarterfinals – Friday, March 14
5	12:00 pm	No. 1 Murray State vs. No. 9 Bradley	86–50	ESPN+
6	2:30 pm	No. 4 Drake vs. No. 5 Illinois State	75–69	ESPN+
7	6:00 pm	No. 2 Missouri State vs. No. 7 UIC	77–70	ESPN+
8	8:30 pm	No. 3 Belmont vs. No. 6 Northern Iowa	64–46	ESPN+
Semifinals – Saturday, March 15
9	1:30 pm	No. 1 Murray State vs. No. 4 Drake	96–90	ESPN+
10	4:00 pm	No. 2 Missouri State vs. No. 3 Belmont	67–76	ESPN+
Championship – Sunday, March 16
11	1:15 pm	No. 1 Murray State vs. No. 3 Belmont	83–62	ESPN2
* Game times in CST through the semifinals and CDT for the championship; rankings denote tournament seed.

== Bracket ==
Opening Round; Thursday, March 13; ESPN+
8	Valparaiso	58
9	Bradley	64
5	Illinois State	88
12	Southern Illinois	48
7	UIC	72
10	Evansville	62
6	Northern Iowa	87
11	Indiana State	73

Quarterfinals; Friday, March 14; ESPN+
1	Murray State	86
9	Bradley	50
4	Drake	75
5	Illinois State	69
2	Missouri State	77
7	UIC	70
3	Belmont	64
6	Northern Iowa	46

Semifinals; Saturday, March 15; ESPN+
1	Murray State	96
4	Drake	90
2	Missouri State	67
3	Belmont	76

Final; Sunday, March 16; ESPN2
1	Murray State	83
3	Belmont	62
