= Southern Illinois Salukis women's basketball =

American women's college basketball team

Southern Illinois Salukis
2024–25 Southern Illinois Salukis women's basketball team
- University: Southern Illinois University
- Head coach: Kelly Bond-White (3rd season)
- Location: Carbondale, Illinois
- Arena: Banterra Center (capacity: 9,328)
- Conference: Missouri Valley
- Nickname: Salukis
- Colors: Maroon and white

NCAA Division I tournament Sweet Sixteen
- 1987

NCAA Division I tournament appearances
- 1986, 1987, 1990, 1992

Conference tournament champions
- 1987, 1990

Conference regular-season champions
- 1986, 1987, 1990, 2007, 2022

Uniforms
Home	Away

The Southern Illinois Salukis women's basketball team represents Southern Illinois University Carbondale in Carbondale, Illinois. The Salukis compete in the Missouri Valley Conference.

== History ==
Southern Illinois began play in 1959. The Salukis have won five regular season titles (1986, 1987, 1990, 2007, 2022) and two conference tournament titles (1987, 1990). They did not lose a conference game in two consecutive seasons from 1985 to 1987. they have made the NCAA Tournament in 1986, 1987, 1990, and 1992, making the Sweet Sixteen in 1987 (they gained a bye into the Second Round and beat LSU 70–56) before losing to Louisiana Tech 66–53. They made the Second Round in 1992 after beating Colorado 84–80, but they were beaten by Ole Miss 72–56. As of the end of the 2015–16 season, they have an all-time record of 663–641. They have made the WNIT five times, thrice in the first edition of the tournament (1969, 1970, 1983), and twice in its second version (2007, 2022). They have also made the Women's Basketball Invitational once, in 2016.

== NCAA tournament results ==
Year	Seed	Round	Opponent	Result
1986	#6	Second Round	#3 Auburn	L 39−61
1987	#5	Second Round; Sweet Sixteen	#4 LSU #1 Louisiana Tech	W 70−56; L 53–66
1990	#11	First Round	#6 Ohio State	L 61−73
1992	#10	First Round; Second Round	#7 Colorado #2 Ole Miss	W 84−80 (OT); L 56–72

== Notable players ==
=== Retired jerseys ===
Southern Illinois has retired two jersey numbers.

No.	Player	Career
34	Amy Rakers	1987–1991
44	Sue Faber	1979–1983
