= Bradley Braves women's basketball =

Bradley Braves
2026–27 Bradley Braves women's basketball team
- University: Bradley University
- Head coach: Chaia Meier (1st season)
- Location: Peoria, Illinois
- Arena: Renaissance Coliseum (capacity: 4,200)
- Conference: Missouri Valley
- Nickname: Braves
- Colors: Red and white

NCAA Division I tournament appearances
- 2021

Conference tournament champions
- 2021

Uniforms
Home	Away

The Bradley Braves women's basketball team represents Bradley University, located in Peoria, Illinois, United States, in NCAA Division I basketball competition. They currently compete in the Missouri Valley Conference.

== History ==
Bradley began play in 1975. They made the 2011 Women's Basketball Invitational. In their only postseason appearance as of 2017, they lost to Minnesota 85–59 in the First Round. The Braves have an all-time record (as of the end of the 2015–16 season) of 504–611. They played in the Gateway Conference from 1983 to 1992 before joining the Missouri Valley Conference in 1992. They have never finished above 3rd place, tying for that position in 2010 (their first since 1992). In 2021, they won their first MVC Tournament and secured a first-round bid to the NCAA Tournament.

== Postseason results ==
=== NCAA Division I tournament results ===
The Braves have appeared in the NCAA Division I tournament once. Their combined record is 0–1.

Year	Seed	Round	Opponent	Result
2021	#11	First Round	#6 Texas	L 62–81
