= Renaissance Coliseum =

Multi-use indoor arena in Peoria, Illinois, U.S.

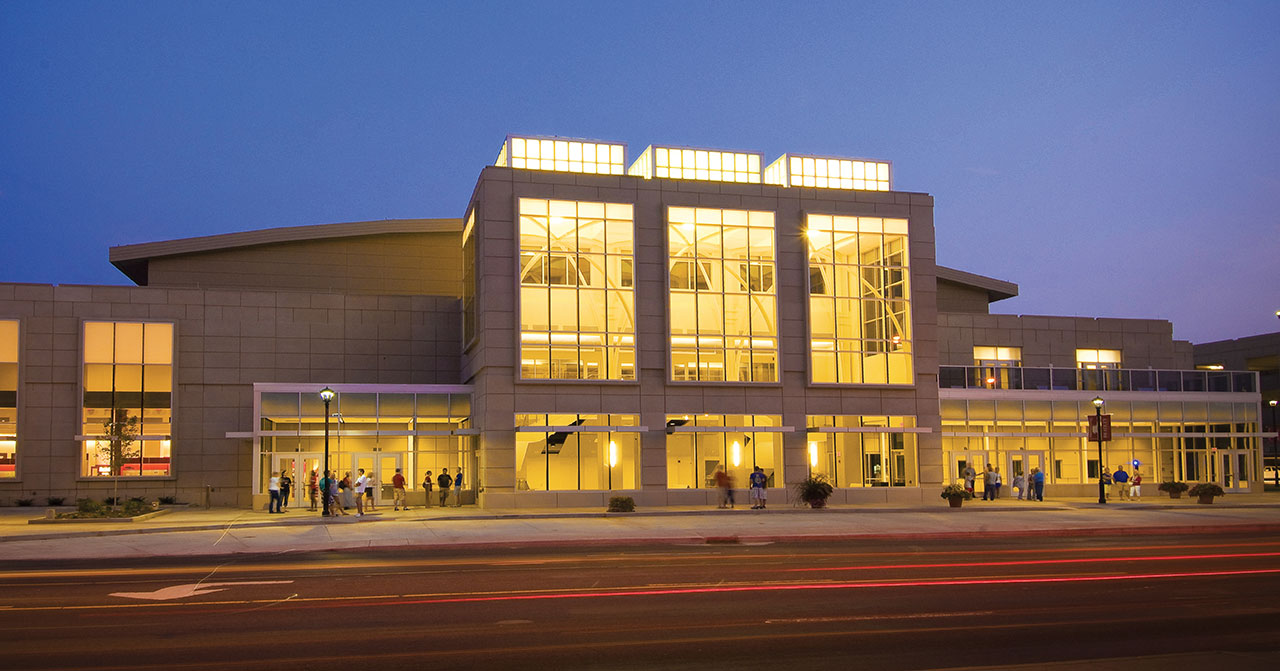
- Interactive map of Renaissance Coliseum
- Former names: Bradley University Arena, Bradley Athletics Performance Center
- Location: Peoria, Illinois
- Coordinates: 40°41′57″N 89°37′4″W
- Owner: Bradley University
- Operator: Bradley University
- Capacity: 4,200
- Public transit: CityLink

Construction
- Opened: August 27, 2010
- Cost: US$50 Million (estimated)
- Architect: PSA/Dewberry

Tenants
- Bradley Braves: Women's basketball Women's volleyball

Renaissance Coliseum is a multi-purpose athletic facility at Bradley University in Peoria, Illinois.

The Bradley Braves women's basketball and volleyball teams play most of their home contests at Renaissance Coliseum, which also houses athletic offices, practice, training/conditioning facilities, the athletics hall of fame and other features. Adjacent to the arena is the men's basketball practice facility. In addition to hosting Bradley Athletics events, the facility hosts concerts, speakers, commencement, IHSA competitions, and other events local to Central Illinois.

== History ==
Renaissance Coliseum was originally intended to be completed in 2009, but construction delays pushed back the opening to the 2010–11 academic year.

After the demolition of Robertson Memorial Field House, the 4,200-seat arena was needed to host sports that don't require the larger Carver Arena. Because of the delays, the Bradley teams moved to Lorene Ramsey Gymnasium at nearby Illinois Central College for the 2009–2010 season.

Two cul de sacs (Haussler Lane and Robertson Court) flank each side of Renaissance Coliseum, paying tribute to two prominent campus names. A.J. Robertson was athletics director at Bradley from 1920 to 1948.

The Coliseum opened on August 27, 2010. The official dedication took place on October 15, 2010.

== Events ==
=== Concerts ===
Concerts the arena has hosted over the years include: Weezer, Jason Derulo, Mike Posner, Taking Back Sunday, Girl Talk, The Band Perry, Plain White T's, The Fray, and Macklemore & Ryan Lewis.

=== Sports ===
In 2012, the Bradley University Men's Basketball team played its first regular season home game on campus since 1982. The team has continued to schedule at least one regular season home game at the arena since then. Bradley played two home games of the CIT postseason tournament at the Coliseum, defeating both the University of Wisconsin-Green Bay and Tulane.

== See also ==
- List of NCAA Division I basketball arenas
