= 2025–26 Loyola Ramblers women's basketball team =

American college basketball season

2025–26 Loyola Ramblers women's basketball

WNIT, Super 16
- Conference: Atlantic 10 Conference
- Record: 16–18 (9–9 A-10)
- Head coach: Allison Guth (4th season)
- Assistant coaches: Jordan McCann; Adam Call; Mai-Loni Henson; Jasmyne Fogle; Alyssa Fisher
- Home arena: Joseph J. Gentile Arena

2025–26 Atlantic 10 women's basketball standings
	Conf.				Overall
Team	W		L	PCT	W		L	PCT
Rhode Island †	16	–	2	.889	28	–	5	.848
George Mason	16	–	2	.889	23	–	10	.697
Richmond	15	–	3	.833	26	–	8	.765
Davidson	12	–	6	.667	21	–	12	.636
Saint Joseph's	10	–	8	.556	20	–	11	.645
La Salle	10	–	8	.556	19	–	14	.576
Dayton	9	–	9	.500	17	–	14	.548
Loyola Chicago	9	–	9	.500	16	–	18	.471
St. Bonaventure	7	–	11	.389	17	–	16	.515
George Washington	7	–	11	.389	18	–	18	.500
Saint Louis	5	–	13	.278	12	–	21	.364
Duquesne	4	–	14	.222	12	–	19	.387
VCU	4	–	14	.222	8	–	23	.258
Fordham	2	–	16	.111	10	–	20	.333
† 2026 A10 tournament winner

The 2025–26 Loyola Ramblers women's basketball team represents Loyola University Chicago during the 2025–26 NCAA Division I women's basketball season. The Ramblers, led by fourth-year head coach Allison Guth, play their home games at the Joseph J. Gentile Arena in Chicago, Illinois as members of the Atlantic 10 Conference.

== Previous season ==
The Ramblers finished the 2024–25 season 12–16, 4–13 in A-10 play, to finish in a tie for 12th place. They were defeated by George Washington in the first round of the A-10 tournament.

== Preseason ==
On September 30, 2025, the Atlantic 10 Conference released their preseason poll. Loyola Chicago was picked to finish 13th in the conference.

=== Preseason rankings ===
Atlantic 10 Preseason Poll
Place	Team	Votes
1	Richmond	188 (9)
2	George Mason	185 (4)
3	Davidson	167 (1)
4	Rhode Island	137
5	Dayton	123
6	Saint Joseph's	120
7	VCU	110
8	Duquesne	95
9	Saint Louis	86
10	George Washington	75
11	Fordham	63
12	La Salle	56
13	Loyola Chicago	43
14	St. Bonaventure	22
(#) first-place votes

=== Preseason All-A10 Teams ===
No players were named to the First, Second, or Third Preseason All-A10 Teams.

=== Preseason All-A10 Defensive Team ===
No players were named to the Preseason All-A10 Defensive Team.

== Roster ==
2025–26 Loyola Ramblers women's basketball team
Players
Coaches

Pos.	#	Name	Height	Year	Previous school	Hometown
F	0	Yasmyn Palmer	6 ft 2 in (1.88 m)	So	Cranbrook Kingswood School	Southfield, Michigan
F	1	Roisin Grandberry	6 ft 4 in (1.93 m)	So	Rolling Meadows High School	Arlington Heights, Illinois
G	2	Alexa Kinas	5 ft 8 in (1.73 m)	So	Kaukauna High School	Kaukauna, Wisconsin
G	4	Audrey Deptula	6 ft 0 in (1.83 m)	Jr	Middleton High School	Middleton, Wisconsin
G	9	Rosalie Mercille	5 ft 9 in (1.75 m)	Jr	Monmouth	Montreal, Quebec
G/F	10	Alex-Anne Bessette	6 ft 2 in (1.88 m)	Fr	Cairine Wilson Secondary School	Quebec City, Quebec
G	11	Kendall Hendrix	5 ft 10 in (1.78 m)	So	West Bloomfield High School	West Bloomfield, Michigan
G	13	Kira Chivers	5 ft 3 in (1.6 m)	Sr	Marist High School	Chicago, Illinois
F	14	Nevaeh Dickman	6 ft 0 in (1.83 m)	Fr	Fishers High School	Fishers, Indiana
G	20	Daniella Matus	5 ft 9 in (1.75 m)	Fr	Morris Catholic High School	Fairfield, New Jersey
F	21	Brooklyn Vaughn	5 ft 11 in (1.8 m)	So	Central Catholic High School	Maumee, Ohio
G	22	Alexus Mobley	5 ft 7 in (1.7 m)	GS	Akron	Indianapolis, Indiana
F	28	Clara Djoko	6 ft 0 in (1.83 m)	RS Jr	UC Irvine	Entzheim, France

Head coach

- Allison Guth (Illinois)

Assistant coach(es)

- Jordan McCann (Illinois)
- Adam Call (Oklahoma)
- Mai-Loni Henson (Washington)
- Jasmyne Fogle (Post)
- Alyssa Fisher (St. Francis Brooklyn)

Legend

- (C) Team captain
- (S) Suspended
- (I) Ineligible
- (W) Walk-on
- Injured
- Current redshirt

Roster
Last update: February 16, 2026

== Schedule and results ==
Date time, TV	Rank^{#}	Opponent^{#}	Result	Record	High points	High rebounds	High assists	Site (attendance) city, state
Exhibition
October 26, 2025*; 1:00 pm		North Central	W 86–42	–	–	–	–	Joseph J. Gentile Arena; Chicago, IL
Regular season
November 3, 2025*; 6:00 pm, ESPN+		at Milwaukee	W 59–55	1–0	12 – Bessette	7 – Kinas	3 – Djoko	Klotsche Center (462); Milwaukee, WI
November 6, 2025*; 5:00 pm, ESPN+		Green Bay	L 46–55	1–1	10 – Deptula	7 – Djoko	3 – Djoko	Joseph J. Gentile Arena (210); Chicago, IL
November 12, 2025*; 6:30 pm, truTV		at No. 1 UConn	L 31–85	1–2	7 – Tied	7 – Hendrix	3 – Kinas	Gampel Pavilion (10,244); Storrs, CT
November 16, 2025*; 1:00 pm, ESPN+		Maryland Eastern Shore	L 67–70	1–3	22 – Vaughn	10 – Vaughn	6 – Kinas	Joseph J. Gentile Arena (576); Chicago, IL
November 18, 2025*; 6:00 pm, ESPN+		Illinois State	L 44−59	1−4	11 – Kinas	13 – Vaughn	3 – Vaughn	Joseph J. Gentile Arena (566); Chicago, IL
November 22, 2025*; 2:00 pm, ESPN+		at UIC	L 54−68	1−5	22 – Bessette	8 – Tied	4 – Tied	Credit Union 1 Arena (495); Chicago, IL
November 26, 2025*; 11:00 am, ESPN+		at DePaul	W 61–49	2–5	16 – Tied	9 – Vaughn	5 – Kinas	Wintrust Arena (1,400); Chicago, IL
December 3, 2025; 5:00 pm, ESPN+		at Richmond	L 46–69	2–6 (0–1)	15 – Bessette	9 – Vaughn	7 – Chivers	Robins Center (1,335); Richmond, VA
December 7, 2025*; 1:00 pm, ESPN+		Western Michigan	L 45–58	2–7	18 – Chivers	8 – Djoko	5 – Vaughn	Joseph J. Gentile Arena (382); Chicago, IL
December 15, 2025*; 11:00 am, Marquee		Oakland	W 59–56	3–7	18 – Bessette	10 – Djoko	5 – Djoko	Joseph J. Gentile Arena (3,825); Chicago, IL
December 18, 2025*; 11:00 am, B1G+		at Northwestern	W 69–68	4–7	22 – Bessette	10 – Vaughn	4 – Tied	Welsh–Ryan Arena (3,102); Evanston, IL
December 22, 2025*; 2:00 pm, ESPN+		Austin Peay	L 47−57	4−8	15 – Vaughn	8 – Vaughn	3 – Kinas	Joseph J. Gentile Arena (390); Chicago, IL
December 31, 2025; 2:00 pm, ESPN+		Davidson	L 50–62	4–9 (0–2)	18 – Kinas	8 – Vaughn	3 – Kinas	Joseph J. Gentile Arena (317); Chicago, IL
January 3, 2026; 7:00 pm, ESPN+		Rhode Island	L 58–70	4–10 (0–3)	17 – Vaughn	10 – Kinas	4 – Chivers	Joseph J. Gentile Arena (371); Chicago, IL
January 7, 2026; 6:00 pm, ESPN+		at Dayton	W 71–68	5–10 (1–3)	20 – Kinas	7 – Vaughn	4 – Vaughn	UD Arena (1,881); Dayton, OH
January 11, 2026; 1:00 pm, USA		Saint Louis	W 71–64	6–10 (2–3)	20 – Bessette	9 – Mobley	2 – Tied	Joseph J. Gentile Arena (428); Chicago, IL
January 14, 2026; 6:00 pm, ESPN+		at George Mason	L 54–59	6–11 (2–4)	17 – Kinas	7 – Kinas	3 – Bessette	EagleBank Arena (727); Fairfax, VA
January 17, 2026; 1:00 pm, ESPN+		at George Washington	W 53–48	7–11 (3–4)	19 – Mobley	5 – Mobley	3 – Chivers	Charles E. Smith Center (573); Washington, D.C.
January 21, 2026; 6:00 pm, ESPN+		La Salle	W 64–60	8–11 (4–4)	18 – Bessette	7 – Kinas	6 – Kinas	Joseph J. Gentile Arena (420); Chicago, IL
January 24, 2026; 6:00 pm, ESPN+		at Saint Louis	W 74–59	9–11 (5–4)	23 – Bessette	8 – Bessette	3 – Chivers	Chaifetz Arena (276); St. Louis, MO
January 31, 2026; 2:00 pm, ESPN+		St. Bonaventure	W 60–52	10–11 (6–4)	18 – Bessette	6 – Tied	4 – Tied	Joseph J. Gentile Arena (499); Chicago, IL
February 4, 2026; 5:00 pm, ESPN+		at Fordham	W 47–42	11–11 (7–4)	17 – Mobley	4 – Tied	3 – Kinas	Rose Hill Gymnasium (406); Bronx, NY
February 7, 2026; 2:00 pm, Marquee		VCU	W 66–55	12–11 (8–4)	23 – Mobley	11 – Vaughn	6 – Kinas	Joseph J. Gentile Arena (834); Chicago, IL
February 11, 2026; 10:00 am, ESPN+		at Duquesne	L 55–67	12–12 (8–5)	14 – Bessette	7 – Kinas	2 – Tied	UPMC Cooper Fieldhouse (3,005); Pittsburgh, PA
February 14, 2026; 6:00 pm, ESPN+		Saint Joseph's	L 50–63	12–13 (8–6)	15 – Kinas	5 – Kinas	4 – Kinas	Joseph J. Gentile Arena (501); Chicago, IL
February 18, 2026; 6:00 pm, ESPN+		George Mason	L 55–67	12–14 (8–7)	15 – Bessette	8 – Mobley	3 – Tied	Joseph J. Gentile Arena (412); Chicago, IL
February 21, 2026; 2:00 pm, ESPN+		at St. Bonaventure	W 58–55	13–14 (9–7)	21 – Kinas	6 – Tied	2 – Tied	Reilly Center (427); St. Bonaventure, NY
February 25, 2026; 6:00 pm, ESPN+		Dayton	L 58–67	13–15 (9–8)	22 – Mobley	6 – Mobley	5 – Chivers	Joseph J. Gentile Arena (804); Chicago, IL
February 28, 2026; 12:00 pm, ESPN+		at La Salle	L 57–70	13–16 (9–9)	13 – Tied	10 – Mobley	4 – Kinas	John Glaser Arena (405); Philadelphia, PA
A-10 tournament
March 5, 2026; 11:00 a.m., ESPN+	(8)	vs. (9) St. Bonaventure; Second round	W 61–59	14–16	20 – Bessette	6 – Tied	4 – Tied	Henrico Sports & Events Center (1,434); Henrico, VA
March 6, 2026; 11:00 a.m., USA	(8)	vs. (1) Rhode Island; Quarterfinals	L 64–71	14–17	19 – Mobley	11 – Mobley	2 – Tied	Henrico Sports & Events Center; Henrico, VA
*Non-conference game. ^{#}Rankings from AP Poll. (#) Tournament seedings in parentheses. All times are in Central.
