= 2025–26 La Salle Explorers women's basketball team =

American college basketball season

2025–26 La Salle Explorers women's basketball

WNIT, Super 16
- Conference: Atlantic 10 Conference
- Record: 19–14 (10–8 A-10)
- Head coach: Mountain MacGillivray (8th season)
- Associate head coach: Chris Day
- Assistant coaches: Tiffany Coll; River Baldwin; Sianny Sanchez-Oliver
- Home arena: John Glaser Arena

2025–26 Atlantic 10 women's basketball standings
	Conf.				Overall
Team	W		L	PCT	W		L	PCT
Rhode Island †	16	–	2	.889	28	–	5	.848
George Mason	16	–	2	.889	23	–	10	.697
Richmond	15	–	3	.833	26	–	8	.765
Davidson	12	–	6	.667	21	–	12	.636
Saint Joseph's	10	–	8	.556	20	–	11	.645
La Salle	10	–	8	.556	19	–	14	.576
Dayton	9	–	9	.500	17	–	14	.548
Loyola Chicago	9	–	9	.500	16	–	18	.471
St. Bonaventure	7	–	11	.389	17	–	16	.515
George Washington	7	–	11	.389	18	–	18	.500
Saint Louis	5	–	13	.278	12	–	21	.364
Duquesne	4	–	14	.222	12	–	19	.387
VCU	4	–	14	.222	8	–	23	.258
Fordham	2	–	16	.111	10	–	20	.333
† 2026 A10 tournament winner

The 2025–26 La Salle Explorers women's basketball team represents La Salle University during the 2025–26 NCAA Division I women's basketball season. The Explorers, led by eighth-year head coach Mountain MacGillivray, play their home games at John Glaser Arena in Philadelphia, Pennsylvania as members of the Atlantic 10 Conference.

== Previous season ==
The Explorers finished the 2024–25 season 8–22, 2–15 in A-10 play, to finish in 14th place. They defeated VCU, before falling to Dayton in the second round of the A-10 tournament.

== Preseason ==
On September 30, 2025, the Atlantic 10 Conference released their preseason poll. La Salle was picked to finish 12th in the conference.

=== Preseason rankings ===
Atlantic 10 Preseason Poll
Place	Team	Votes
1	Richmond	188 (9)
2	George Mason	185 (4)
3	Davidson	167 (1)
4	Rhode Island	137
5	Dayton	123
6	Saint Joseph's	120
7	VCU	110
8	Duquesne	95
9	Saint Louis	86
10	George Washington	75
11	Fordham	63
12	La Salle	56
13	Loyola Chicago	43
14	St. Bonaventure	22
(#) first-place votes

=== Preseason All-A10 Teams ===
Preseason All-A10 Teams
Team	Player	Year	Position
Third	Joan Quinn	Sophomore	Guard

=== Preseason All-A10 Defensive Team ===
No players were named to the Preseason All-A10 Defensive Team.

== Roster ==
2025–26 La Salle Explorers women's basketball team
Players
Coaches

Pos.	#	Name	Height	Year	Previous school	Hometown
G	0	Aryss Macktoon	5 ft 11 in (1.8 m)	RS So	St. Timothy's School	Baltimore, Maryland
G	3	Lauren Patnode	6 ft 0 in (1.83 m)	RS Fr	Perkiomen School	Saratoga Springs, New York
G	6	Jana Mbombo Njoya	5 ft 11 in (1.8 m)	Fr	Tony Parker Adéquat Academy	Montpellier, France
F	7	Amiya Moses	6 ft 2 in (1.88 m)	Fr	Addison School	Scarborough, Ontario
G/F	8	Diora Ressaissi	6 ft 0 in (1.83 m)	So	Long Island Lutheran High School	Orlando, Florida
G	10	Ivona Miljanic	6 ft 0 in (1.83 m)	Sr	Young Harris	Belgrade, Serbia
G	11	Sania Jenkins	5 ft 11 in (1.8 m)	So	Etiwanda High School	Narrabeen, Australia
G	12	India Webb	5 ft 7 in (1.7 m)	Fr	Preparatory Charter School	Philadelphia, Pennsylvania
G	13	Joan Quinn	5 ft 9 in (1.75 m)	So	Cardinal O'Hara High School	Newtown Square, Pennsylvania
G	15	Ashleigh Connor	5 ft 11 in (1.8 m)	RS Jr	Saint Louis	Pittsburgh, Pennsylvania
F	20	Anna Przyszlak	6 ft 1 in (1.85 m)	Sr	Cowley Community College	Gdańsk, Poland
G	21	Ty'Renisha Bowers	5 ft 8 in (1.73 m)	Sr	SAU Tech	Natchez, Louisiana
G/F	22	Yar Manyiel	6 ft 0 in (1.83 m)	Jr	Johnson County Community College	Nairobi, Kenya
F	24	Kiara Williams	6 ft 0 in (1.83 m)	RS Fr	Pittsburgh	Palm Bay, Florida
G	25	Charity Sawyer	5 ft 8 in (1.73 m)	Fr	International Christian High School	Philadelphia, Pennsylvania
C	33	Ava Hoy	6 ft 3 in (1.91 m)	Fr	H.C. Williams High School	Canton, New York

Head coach

- Mountain MacGillivray (Temple)

Assistant coach(es)

- Chris Day (West Chester)
- Tiffany Coll (UMBC)
- River Baldwin (NC State)
- Sianny Sanchez-Oliver (New Mexico State)

Legend

- (C) Team captain
- (S) Suspended
- (I) Ineligible
- (W) Walk-on
- Injured
- Current redshirt

Roster
Last update: February 17, 2026

== Schedule and results ==
Date time, TV	Rank^{#}	Opponent^{#}	Result	Record	High points	High rebounds	High assists	Site (attendance) city, state
Regular season
November 6, 2025*; 7:00 pm, ESPN+		at Loyola (MD)	W 71–59	1–0	25 – Macktoon	10 – Macktoon	5 – Connor	Reitz Arena (683); Baltimore, MD
November 8, 2025*; 12:00 pm, ESPN+		Saint Francis	W 84–73	2–0	22 – Connor	7 – Macktoon	5 – Connor	John Glaser Arena (2,942); Philadelphia, PA
November 11, 2025*; 6:00 pm, ESPN+		at Lehigh	W 81–70	3–0	24 – Macktoon	7 – Connor	3 – Tied	Stabler Arena (428); Bethlehem, PA
November 14, 2025*; 11:00 am, ESPN+		at Temple; Big 5 Classic Pod 2	L 54–75	3–1	16 – Macktoon	5 – Macktoon	6 – Quinn	Liacouras Center (3,507); Philadelphia, PA
November 18, 2025*; 6:30 pm, ESPN+		West Chester	W 83−50	4−1	18 – Connor	14 – Macktoon	4 – Connor	John Glaser Arena (415); Philadelphia, PA
November 22, 2025*; 1:00 pm, ESPN+		American	W 72−61	5−1	20 – Quinn	5 – Tied	4 – Connor	John Glaser Arena (348); Philadelphia, PA
November 25, 2025*; 6:30 pm, ESPN+		Villanova; Big 5 Classic Pod 2	L 54–66	5–2	17 – Connor	9 – Connor	4 – Connor	John Glaser Arena (287); Philadelphia, PA
December 3, 2025; 6:30 pm, ESPN+		VCU	W 70–62	6–2 (1–0)	21 – Macktoon	8 – Williams	6 – Connor	John Glaser Arena (380); Philadelphia, PA
December 7, 2025*; 12:00 pm, ESPN+		vs. Penn; Big 5 Classic 5th Place Game	L 52–65	6–3	15 – Macktoon	7 – Macktoon	7 – Connor	Finneran Pavilion; Villanova, PA
December 14, 2025*; 2:00 pm, DSN		at Maryland Eastern Shore	W 63–58	7–3	14 – Tied	6 – Tied	8 – Connor	Hytche Athletic Center (200); Princess Anne, MD
December 17, 2025*; 11:00 am, ESPN+		at Delaware	W 65–48	8–3	15 – Macktoon	7 – Tied	4 – Williams	Bob Carpenter Center (3,605); Newark, DE
December 20, 2025*; 12:00 pm, ESPN+		Mississippi State	L 37−85	8−4	10 – Connor	4 – Tied	3 – Quinn	John Glaser Arena (490); Philadelphia, PA
December 31, 2025; 1:00 pm, ESPN+		at Fordham	W 72–69	9–4 (2–0)	17 – Connor	7 – Tied	5 – Connor	Rose Hill Gymnasium (268); Bronx, NY
January 3, 2026; 1:00 pm, ESPN+		George Washington	W 66–52	10–4 (3–0)	18 – Macktoon	8 – Macktoon	4 – Williams	John Glaser Arena (205); Philadelphia, PA
January 7, 2026; 7:00 pm, ESPN+		at George Mason	L 47–62	10–5 (3–1)	17 – Macktoon	7 – Connor	3 – Quinn	EagleBank Arena (784); Fairfax, VA
January 10, 2026; 2:00 pm, ESPN+/NBCSP		at Saint Joseph's	L 60–69	10–6 (3–2)	19 – Macktoon	5 – Tied	3 – Tied	Hagan Arena (1,132); Philadelphia, PA
January 14, 2026; 11:00 am, ESPN+		Saint Louis	L 57–66	10–7 (3–3)	25 – Connor	10 – Tied	2 – Tied	John Glaser Arena (850); Philadelphia, PA
January 18, 2026; 1:00 pm, ESPN+		Davidson	L 58–62	10–8 (3–4)	19 – Quinn	6 – Macktoon	4 – Connor	John Glaser Arena (123); Philadelphia, PA
January 21, 2026; 7:00 pm, ESPN+		at Loyola Chicago	L 60–64	10–9 (3–5)	20 – Williams	9 – Macktoon	6 – Connor	Joseph J. Gentile Arena (420); Chicago, IL
January 24, 2026; 1:00 pm, ESPN+		at St. Bonaventure	W 83–74	11–9 (4–5)	23 – Macktoon	8 – Macktoon	4 – Tied	Reilly Center (252); St. Bonaventure, NY
January 28, 2026; 6:30 pm, ESPN+		Saint Joseph's	L 65–69	11–10 (4–6)	18 – Quinn	7 – Tied	8 – Connor	John Glaser Arena (385); Philadelphia, PA
January 31, 2026; 2:00 pm, ESPN+		at Duquesne	W 77–61	12–10 (5–6)	26 – Connor	8 – Williams	5 – Williams	UPMC Cooper Fieldhouse (1,237); Pittsburgh, PA
February 4, 2026; 6:30 pm, ESPN+		Dayton	L 60–68	12–11 (5–7)	17 – Connor	12 – Macktoon	5 – Connor	John Glaser Arena (235); Philadelphia, PA
February 7, 2026; 1:00 pm, ESPN+		Fordham	W 70–53	13–11 (6–7)	18 – Macktoon	6 – Quinn	4 – Tied	John Glaser Arena (515); Philadelphia, PA
February 14, 2026; 2:00 pm, ESPN+		at George Washington	W 67–52	14–11 (7–7)	18 – Connor	11 – Macktoon	3 – Moses	Charles E. Smith Center (702); Washington, D.C.
February 18, 2026; 6:30 pm, ESPN+		Rhode Island	W 63–59	15–11 (8–7)	21 – Quinn	5 – Tied	3 – Connor	John Glaser Arena (321); Philadelphia, PA
February 22, 2026; 2:00 pm, ESPN+		at Richmond	L 58–92	15–12 (8–8)	15 – Connor	6 – Macktoon	5 – Connor	Robins Center (2,268); Richmond, VA
February 25, 2026; 6:00 pm, ESPN+		at VCU	W 71–54	16–12 (9–8)	28 – Macktoon	10 – Macktoon	4 – Macktoon	Siegel Center (1,003); Richmond, VA
February 28, 2026; 1:00 pm, ESPN+		Loyola Chicago	W 70–57	17–12 (10–8)	26 – Connor	11 – Macktoon	4 – Williams	John Glaser Arena (405); Philadelphia, PA
A-10 tournament
March 5, 2026; 7:30 p.m., ESPN+	(6)	vs. (11) Saint Louis; Second round	W 59–51	18–12	16 – Connor	14 – Macktoon	8 – Connor	Henrico Sports & Events Center (1,273); Henrico, VA
March 6, 2026; 7:30 p.m., CNBC	(6)	vs. (3) Richmond; Quarterfinals	L 51–70	18–13	18 – Connor	13 – Macktoon	4 – Connor	Henrico Sports & Events Center (2,618); Henrico, VA
WNIT
March 23, 2026*; 6:00 p.m., ESPN+		Binghamton; Second round	W 70–61	19–13	22 – Macktoon	10 – Macktoon	4 – Macktoon	John Glaser Arena (1,069); Philadelphia, PA
March 25, 2026*; 6:00 p.m., ESPN+		at Army; Super 16	L 63–74	19–14	24 – Williams	11 – Williams	3 – Macktoon	Christl Arena (540); West Point, NY
*Non-conference game. ^{#}Rankings from AP Poll. (#) Tournament seedings in parentheses. All times are in Eastern.
