= 2025–26 Fordham Rams women's basketball team =

American college basketball season

2025–26 Fordham Rams women's basketball
- Conference: Atlantic 10 Conference
- Record: 10–20 (2–16 A-10)
- Head coach: Bridgette Mitchell (3rd season)
- Assistant coaches: Keturah Jackson; Andre Jurko; John Azzinaro; Leah Metcalf; Jared Wilson
- Home arena: Rose Hill Gymnasium

2025–26 Atlantic 10 women's basketball standings
	Conf.				Overall
Team	W		L	PCT	W		L	PCT
Rhode Island †	16	–	2	.889	28	–	5	.848
George Mason	16	–	2	.889	23	–	10	.697
Richmond	15	–	3	.833	26	–	8	.765
Davidson	12	–	6	.667	21	–	12	.636
Saint Joseph's	10	–	8	.556	20	–	11	.645
La Salle	10	–	8	.556	19	–	14	.576
Dayton	9	–	9	.500	17	–	14	.548
Loyola Chicago	9	–	9	.500	16	–	18	.471
St. Bonaventure	7	–	11	.389	17	–	16	.515
George Washington	7	–	11	.389	18	–	18	.500
Saint Louis	5	–	13	.278	12	–	21	.364
Duquesne	4	–	14	.222	12	–	19	.387
VCU	4	–	14	.222	8	–	23	.258
Fordham	2	–	16	.111	10	–	20	.333
† 2026 A10 tournament winner

The 2025–26 Fordham Rams women's basketball team represents Fordham University during the 2025–26 NCAA Division I women's basketball season. The Rams, led by third-year head coach Bridgette Mitchell, play their home games at Rose Hill Gymnasium in The Bronx, New York, as members of the Atlantic 10 Conference.

== Previous season ==
The Rams finished the 2024–25 season 15–15, 9–9 in A-10 play, to finish in a tie for eighth place. They were defeated by Duquesne in the second round of the A-10 tournament.

== Preseason ==
On September 30, 2025, the Atlantic 10 Conference released their preseason poll. Fordham was picked to finish eleventh in the conference.

=== Preseason rankings ===
Atlantic 10 Preseason Poll
Place	Team	Votes
1	Richmond	188 (9)
2	George Mason	185 (4)
3	Davidson	167 (1)
4	Rhode Island	137
5	Dayton	123
6	Saint Joseph's	120
7	VCU	110
8	Duquesne	95
9	Saint Louis	86
10	George Washington	75
11	Fordham	63
12	La Salle	56
13	Loyola Chicago	43
14	St. Bonaventure	22
(#) first-place votes

=== Preseason All-A10 Teams ===
No players were named to the First, Second, or Third Preseason All-A10 Teams.

=== Preseason All-A10 Defensive Team ===
No players were named to the Preseason All-A10 Defensive Team.

== Roster ==
2025–26 Fordham Rams women's basketball team
Players
Coaches

Pos.	#	Name	Height	Year	Previous school	Hometown
G	0	Alexis Black	5 ft 9 in (1.75 m)	Sr	Appalachian State	Washington, D.C.
G	1	Maysen Hill	5 ft 11 in (1.8 m)	Fr	St. Andrew's School	South Kingstown, Rhode Island
G	3	Carryn Easley	5 ft 5 in (1.65 m)	Fr	Neumann Goretti High School	Philadelphia, Pennsylvania
G	4	Lakresha Edwards	6 ft 0 in (1.83 m)	Jr	Miami (OH)	Chilliwack, British Columbia
F	5	Ornella Niankan	6 ft 0 in (1.83 m)	GS	Wichita State	Montreal, Quebec
G	7	Tia Morgan	5 ft 8 in (1.73 m)	GS	Purdue Fort Wayne	Chicago, Illinois
G	9	Anastasija Veljovic	5 ft 11 in (1.8 m)	So	Fort Erie International Academy	Mississauga, Ontario
F	10	London Liley	5 ft 11 in (1.8 m)	Fr	Maret School	Oxon Hill, Maryland
F	11	Precious Omoshola	6 ft 2 in (1.88 m)	So	Storm King School	London, England
F	13	Emma Wilson-Saltos	5 ft 11 in (1.8 m)	Sr	Monroe	Bronx, New York
F	21	Ugne Sirtautaite	6 ft 1 in (1.85 m)	Jr	Providence	Kaunas, Lithuania
F	25	Kaila Berry	5 ft 11 in (1.8 m)	Sr	St. John's Prep	Brooklyn, New York

Head coach

- Bridgette Mitchell (Duke)

Assistant coach(es)

- Keturah Jackson (Duke)
- Andre Jurko (Florida State)
- John Azzinaro (Bucknell)
- Leah Metcalf (North Carolina)
- Jared Wilson (USC)

Legend

- (C) Team captain
- (S) Suspended
- (I) Ineligible
- (W) Walk-on
- Injured
- Current redshirt

Roster
Last update: February 21, 2026

== Schedule and results ==
Date time, TV	Rank^{#}	Opponent^{#}	Result	Record	High points	High rebounds	High assists	Site (attendance) city, state
Regular season
November 3, 2025*; 6:00 pm, ESPN+		Adelphi	W 60–51	1–0	14 – Tied	9 – Berry	4 – Black	Rose Hill Gymnasium (285); Bronx, NY
November 7, 2025*; 5:00 pm, ESPN+		NJIT	L 78–82	1–1	30 – Black	7 – Tied	5 – Easley	Rose Hill Gymnasium; Bronx, NY
November 10, 2025*; 6:00 pm, ESPN+		Saint Peter's	W 70–56	2–1	20 – Black	9 – Sirtautaite	5 – Black	Rose Hill Gymnasium (380); Bronx, NY
November 12, 2025*; 6:00 pm, ESPN+		Stony Brook	W 58–52	3–1	20 – Black	10 – Wilson-Saltos	5 – Easley	Rose Hill Gymnasium (392); Bronx, NY
November 16, 2025*; 2:00 pm, ESPN+		at Buffalo	L 59−67	3−2	13 – Tied	8 – Wilson-Saltos	4 – Black	Alumni Arena (883); Amherst, NY
November 20, 2025*; 7:00 pm, ESPN+		at Seton Hall	L 83−90 ^{2OT}	3−3	42 – Black	11 – Sirtautaite	4 – Tied	Walsh Gymnasium (689); South Orange, NJ
November 23, 2025*; 2:00 pm, ESPN+		Manhattan; Battle of the Bronx	W 65–62	4–3	20 – Black	8 – Niankan	7 – Black	Rose Hill Gymnasium (426); Bronx, NY
November 26, 2025*; 1:00 pm, ESPN+		at Niagara	W 70–47	5–3	18 – Black	10 – Niankan	2 – Tied	Gallagher Center (129); Lewiston, NY
November 30, 2025*; 2:00 pm, YES/ESPN+		LIU	W 72–51	6–3	12 – Sirtautaite	7 – Black	5 – Black	Rose Hill Gymnasium (184); Bronx, NY
December 3, 2025; 7:00 pm, ESPN+		at George Mason	L 55–73	6–4 (0–1)	21 – Black	7 – Wilson-Saltos	3 – Black	EagleBank Arena (658); Fairfax, VA
December 6, 2025*; 2:00 pm, FloCollege/MSG2		at Hofstra	W 69–46	7–4	14 – Sirtautaite	7 – Wilson-Saltos	6 – Morgan	Mack Sports Complex (327); Hempstead, NY
December 21, 2025*; 1:00 pm, YES/ESPN+		Saint Francis	W 86−61	8−4	25 – Black	10 – Wilson-Saltos	9 – Easley	Rose Hill Gymnasium (313); Bronx, NY
December 31, 2025; 1:00 pm, ESPN+		La Salle	L 69–72	8–5 (0–2)	21 – Black	8 – Niankan	6 – Black	Rose Hill Gymnasium (268); Bronx, NY
January 3, 2026; 2:00 pm, SNY/ESPN+		Saint Joseph's	L 49–78	8–6 (0–3)	12 – Sirtautaite	7 – Veljovic	3 – Tied	Rose Hill Gymnasium (216); Bronx, NY
January 7, 2026; 6:00 pm, ESPN+		at Richmond	L 65–84	8–7 (0–4)	12 – Niankan	6 – Niankan	4 – Easley	Robins Center (1,204); Richmond, VA
January 10, 2026; 2:00 pm, ESPN+		Dayton	L 58–66	8–8 (0–5)	17 – Edwards	7 – Easley	6 – Easley	Rose Hill Gymnasium (239); Bronx, NY
January 14, 2026; 7:00 pm, ESPN+		at Davidson	L 50–74	8–9 (0–6)	12 – Morgan	7 – Wilson-Saltos	3 – Easley	John M. Belk Arena (770); Davidson, NC
January 18, 2026; 2:00 pm, ESPN+		St. Bonaventure	W 66–53	9–9 (1–6)	16 – Tied	16 – Wilson-Saltos	7 – Easley	Rose Hill Gymnasium (504); Bronx, NY
January 21, 2026; 11:00 am, SNY/ESPN+		Saint Louis	L 57–67 ^{OT}	9–10 (1–7)	11 – Morgan	8 – Omoshola	6 – Easley	Rose Hill Gymnasium (1,800); Bronx, NY
January 24, 2026; 2:00 pm, ESPN+		at George Washington	L 47–58	9–11 (1–8)	18 – Edwards	7 – Omoshola	2 – Easley	Charles E. Smith Center (527); Washington, D.C.
January 28, 2026; 11:00 am, ESPN+		at VCU	L 58–69	9–12 (1–9)	15 – Edwards	7 – Omoshola	4 – Black	Siegel Center (319); Richmond, VA
January 31, 2026; 2:00 pm, ESPN+		Rhode Island	L 47–61	9–13 (1–10)	14 – Black	11 – Berry	2 – Wilson-Saltos	Rose Hill Gymnasium (506); Bronx, NY
February 4, 2026; 6:00 pm, ESPN+		Loyola Chicago	L 42–47	9–14 (1–11)	13 – Wilson-Saltos	11 – Berry	2 – Wilson-Saltos	Rose Hill Gymnasium (406); Bronx, NY
February 7, 2026; 1:00 pm, ESPN+		at La Salle	L 53–70	9–15 (1–12)	14 – Black	9 – Veljovic	2 – Tied	John Glaser Arena (515); Philadelphia, PA
February 11, 2026; 12:00 pm, ESPN+		at Saint Louis	W 42–39	10–15 (2–12)	11 – Easley	9 – Omoshola	2 – Tied	Chaifetz Arena (8,000); St. Louis, MO
February 14, 2026; 2:00 pm, ESPN+		Duquesne	L 67–80	10–16 (2–13)	24 – Edwards	8 – Veljovic	5 – Easley	Rose Hill Gymnasium; Bronx, NY
February 21, 2026; 1:00 pm, ESPN+		at Rhode Island	L 39–69	10–17 (2–14)	10 – Edwards	6 – Wilson-Saltos	2 – Easley	Ryan Center (2,528); Kingston, RI
February 25, 2026; 6:00 pm, ESPN+		Davidson	L 49–58	10–18 (2–15)	11 – Easley	6 – Wilson-Saltos	2 – Tied	Rose Hill Gymnasium (376); Bronx, NY
February 28, 2026; 1:00 pm, ESPN+		at St. Bonaventure	L 69–77	10–19 (2–16)	18 – Black	3 – Tied	4 – Easley	Reilly Center (357); St. Bonaventure, NY
A-10 tournament
March 4, 2026; 2:30 p.m., ESPN+	(14)	vs. (11) Saint Louis; First round	L 60–68	10–20	23 – Easley	5 – Omoshola	3 – Easley	Henrico Sports & Events Center (1,181); Henrico, VA
*Non-conference game. ^{#}Rankings from AP Poll. (#) Tournament seedings in parentheses. All times are in Eastern.
