= 2025–26 Saint Joseph's Hawks women's basketball team =

American college basketball season

2025–26 Saint Joseph's Hawks women's basketball
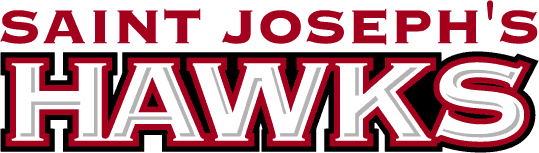
- Conference: Atlantic 10 Conference
- Record: 20–11 (10–8 A-10)
- Head coach: Cindy Griffin (25th season)
- Associate head coach: Melissa Dunne
- Assistant coaches: Ashley Prim; MyNeshia McKenzie; Tyler Robinson; Megan Bauman
- Home arena: Hagan Arena

2025–26 Atlantic 10 women's basketball standings
	Conf.				Overall
Team	W		L	PCT	W		L	PCT
Rhode Island †	16	–	2	.889	28	–	5	.848
George Mason	16	–	2	.889	23	–	10	.697
Richmond	15	–	3	.833	26	–	8	.765
Davidson	12	–	6	.667	21	–	12	.636
Saint Joseph's	10	–	8	.556	20	–	11	.645
La Salle	10	–	8	.556	19	–	14	.576
Dayton	9	–	9	.500	17	–	14	.548
Loyola Chicago	9	–	9	.500	16	–	18	.471
St. Bonaventure	7	–	11	.389	17	–	16	.515
George Washington	7	–	11	.389	18	–	18	.500
Saint Louis	5	–	13	.278	12	–	21	.364
Duquesne	4	–	14	.222	12	–	19	.387
VCU	4	–	14	.222	8	–	23	.258
Fordham	2	–	16	.111	10	–	20	.333
† 2026 A10 tournament winner

The 2025–26 Saint Joseph's Hawks women's basketball team represented Saint Joseph's University during the 2025–26 NCAA Division I women's basketball season. The Hawks, led by 25th-year head coach Cindy Griffin, played their home games at Hagan Arena in Philadelphia, Pennsylvania as members of the Atlantic 10 Conference.

== Previous season ==
The Hawks finished the 2024–25 season 24–10, 12–6 in A-10 play, to finish in fourth place. They defeated Rhode Island and Richmond, before falling to George Mason in the A-10 tournament championship game. They received an at-large bid to the WBIT, where they would beat Albany in the First Round, before falling to Villanova in the Second Round.

== Preseason ==
On September 30, 2025, the Atlantic 10 Conference released their preseason poll. Saint Joseph's was picked to finish sixth in the conference.

=== Preseason rankings ===
Atlantic 10 Preseason Poll
Place	Team	Votes
1	Richmond	188 (9)
2	George Mason	185 (4)
3	Davidson	167 (1)
4	Rhode Island	137
5	Dayton	123
6	Saint Joseph's	120
7	VCU	110
8	Duquesne	95
9	Saint Louis	86
10	George Washington	75
11	Fordham	63
12	La Salle	56
13	Loyola Chicago	43
14	St. Bonaventure	22
(#) first-place votes

=== Preseason All-A10 Teams ===
Preseason All-A10 Team
Team	Player	Year	Position
Second	Aleah Snead	Junior	Guard
Third	Gabby Casey	Junior	Guard

=== Preseason All-A10 Defensive Team ===
Preseason All-A10 Defensive Team
Player	Year	Position
Aleah Snead	Junior	Guard

== Roster ==
2025–26 Saint Joseph's Hawks women's basketball team
Players
Coaches

Pos.	#	Name	Height	Year	Previous school	Hometown
F	00	Faith Stinson	6 ft 2 in (1.88 m)	Sr	IU Indy	Thornville, Ohio
G	1	Rhian Stokes	5 ft 7 in (1.7 m)	So	Ewing High School	Ewing, New Jersey
G	2	Aleah Snead	5 ft 11 in (1.8 m)	Jr	William Penn Charter School	Philadelphia, Pennsylvania
F	9	Meja Jägerskog	6 ft 2 in (1.88 m)	So	RIG Luleå Elite Academy	Stockholm, Sweden
G	11	Kaylie Griffin	5 ft 7 in (1.7 m)	GS	Gwynedd Mercy Academy High School	Conshohocken, Pennsylvania
G	15	Gabby Casey	5 ft 9 in (1.75 m)	Jr	Lansdale Catholic High School	Quakertown, Pennsylvania
F	19	Olivia Lutterodt	6 ft 2 in (1.88 m)	Fr	Allerød Gymnasium	Farum, Denmark
G	22	Kaylinn Bethea	5 ft 9 in (1.75 m)	Fr	William Penn Charter School	Voorhees, New Jersey
G	24	Jill Jekot	5 ft 11 in (1.8 m)	So	Penn State	Enola, Pennsylvania
F	25	Rian Dotsey	6 ft 2 in (1.88 m)	Fr	Haverford High School	Havertown, Pennsylvania
G	30	Emily Knouse	5 ft 11 in (1.8 m)	Fr	Archbishop Wood Catholic High School	Horsham, Pennsylvania
G	31	Lauren Greer	5 ft 6 in (1.68 m)	So	Archbishop Wood Catholic High School	Philadelphia, Pennsylvania
F	32	Cecilia Kay	6 ft 2 in (1.88 m)	So	American	Melrose, Massachusetts
G	33	Emirson Devenie	6 ft 1 in (1.85 m)	Sr	Royal Crown Academy	Melbourne, Australia

Head coach

- Cindy Griffin (Saint Joseph's)

Assistant coach(es)

- Melissa Dunne (Temple)
- Ashley Prim (Saint Joseph's)
- MyNeshia McKenzie (Rider)
- Tyler Robinson (Penn State)
- Megan Bauman (NYU)

Legend

- (C) Team captain
- (S) Suspended
- (I) Ineligible
- (W) Walk-on
- Injured
- Current redshirt

Roster
Last update: February 15, 2026

== Schedule and results ==
Date time, TV	Rank^{#}	Opponent^{#}	Result	Record	High points	High rebounds	High assists	Site (attendance) city, state
Regular season
November 4, 2025*; 7:00 pm, ESPN+		West Chester	W 69–46	1–0	20 – Jekot	11 – Kay	5 – Stokes	Hagan Arena (1,143); Philadelphia, PA
November 7, 2025*; 7:00 pm, ESPN+		at Maine	W 63–62	2–0	19 – Casey	9 – Casey	7 – Snead	Memorial Gymnasium (1,230); Orono, ME
November 11, 2025*; 7:00 pm, ESPN+		Cincinnati	W 70–65	3–0	19 – Snead	9 – Casey	4 – Stokes	Hagan Arena (895); Philadelphia, PA
November 16, 2025*; 2:00 pm, ESPN+/NBCSP		Penn State	L 77–89	3–1	24 – Casey	6 – Snead	5 – Casey	Hagan Arena (1,522); Philadelphia, PA
November 20, 2025*; 11:00 am, ESPN+		at Columbia	W 66–48	4–1	17 – Casey	7 – Jekot	4 – Jekot	Levien Gymnasium (2,511); New York, NY
November 24, 2025*; 6:00 pm, ESPN+/NBCSP		at Penn; Big 5 Classic Pod 1	W 74−53	5−1	18 – Snead	11 – Snead	8 – Snead	The Palestra (491); Philadelphia, PA
November 29, 2025*; 2:00 pm, ESPN+/NBCSP		Drexel; Big 5 Classic Pod 1	W 57−55	6−1	16 – Casey	12 – Snead	3 – Tied	Hagan Arena (1,009); Philadelphia, PA
December 3, 2025; 7:00 pm, ESPN+		Rhode Island	L 52–59	6–2 (0–1)	16 – Stokes	7 – Snead	4 – Tied	Hagan Arena (875); Philadelphia, PA
December 7, 2025*; 4:30 pm, NBCSP		at Villanova; Big 5 Classic championship/Holy War	L 70–76	6–3	23 – Stokes	8 – Casey	6 – Stokes	Finneran Pavilion (1,242); Villanova, PA
December 20, 2025*; 12:00 pm, ESPN+		Le Moyne; Hawk Classic	W 100–40	7–3	18 – Stinson	10 – Casey	6 – Casey	Hagan Arena (1,031); Philadelphia, PA
December 21, 2025*; 2:00 pm, ESPN+		Delaware; Hawk Classic	W 73–66	8–3	19 – Casey	6 – Tied	5 – Tied	Hagan Arena (1,051); Philadelphia, PA
December 28, 2025*; 2:00 pm, ESPN+		Arcadia	W 108–38	9–3	16 – Jekot	9 – Jägerskog	10 – Stokes	Hagan Arena (2,012); Philadelphia, PA
December 31, 2025; 2:00 pm, ESPN+		VCU	W 55−45	10−3 (1–1)	11 – Stokes	9 – Stinson	5 – Stokes	Hagan Arena (942); Philadelphia, PA
January 3, 2026; 2:00 pm, ESPN+/NBCSP/SNY		at Fordham	W 78–49	11–3 (2–1)	19 – Casey	7 – Casey	7 – Casey	Rose Hill Gymnasium (216); Bronx, NY
January 7, 2026; 6:00 pm, ESPN+		at Davidson	L 36–48	11–4 (2–2)	19 – Casey	8 – Casey	2 – Stokes	John M. Belk Arena (742); Davidson, NC
January 10, 2026; 2:00 pm, ESPN+/NBCSP		La Salle	W 69–60	12–4 (3–2)	15 – Casey	7 – Casey	2 – Tied	Hagan Arena (1,132); Philadelphia, PA
January 14, 2026; 6:00 pm, ESPN+		at St. Bonaventure	L 48–57	12–5 (3–3)	20 – Stokes	8 – Casey	3 – Kay	Reilly Center (305); St. Bonaventure, NY
January 18, 2026; 2:00 pm, CBSSN		George Mason	L 59–66	12–6 (3–4)	15 – Stokes	10 – Casey	4 – Stokes	Hagan Arena (1,057); Philadelphia, PA
January 24, 2026; 12:00 pm, ESPN+		at Duquesne	W 72–53	13–6 (4–4)	26 – Casey	10 – Casey	5 – Casey	UPMC Cooper Fieldhouse (850); Pittsburgh, PA
January 28, 2026; 6:30 pm, ESPN+		at La Salle	W 69–65	14–6 (5–4)	14 – Casey	7 – Kay	4 – Stinson	John Glaser Arena (385); Philadelphia, PA
February 1, 2026; 1:00 pm, ESPN+		Davidson	W 59–51	15–6 (6–4)	22 – Casey	6 – Tied	3 – Stinson	Hagan Arena (1,054); Philadelphia, PA
February 4, 2026; 6:00 pm, ESPN+		at Rhode Island	L 61–69	15–7 (6–5)	24 – Snead	9 – Tied	5 – Stokes	Ryan Center (1,216); Kingston, RI
February 7, 2026; 2:00 pm, ESPN+		Dayton	L 73–75	15–8 (6–6)	29 – Casey	7 – Casey	4 – Tied	Hagan Arena (1,050); Philadelphia, PA
February 11, 2026; 11:00 am, ESPN+/NBCSP		George Washington	W 70–63	16–8 (7–6)	16 – Stokes	6 – Snead	5 – Casey	Hagan Arena (1,580); Philadelphia, PA
February 14, 2026; 7:00 pm, ESPN+		at Loyola Chicago	W 63–50	17–8 (8–6)	16 – Snead	12 – Snead	6 – Snead	Joseph J. Gentile Arena (501); Chicago, IL
February 18, 2026; 7:00 pm, ESPN+		Duquesne	W 61–46	18–8 (9–6)	19 – Casey	9 – Tied	5 – Stokes	Hagan Arena (1,059); Philadelphia, PA
February 21, 2026; 3:00 pm, ESPN+		at Saint Louis	W 65–54	19–8 (10–6)	18 – Snead	5 – Tied	7 – Snead	Chaifetz Arena (1,374); St. Louis, MO
February 25, 2026; 7:00 pm, ESPN+		at George Mason	L 59–85	19–9 (10–7)	15 – Stinson	6 – Kay	3 – Tied	EagleBank Arena (846); Fairfax, VA
February 28, 2026; 2:00 pm, ESPN+		Richmond	L 61–72	19–10 (10–8)	15 – Stokes	7 – Snead	4 – Stokes	Hagan Arena (1,604); Philadelphia, PA
A-10 tournament
March 5, 2026; 1:30 p.m., ESPN+	(5)	vs. (12) Duquesne; Second round	W 66–45	20–10	16 – Casey	11 – Jekot	6 – Snead	Henrico Sports & Events Center (1,434); Henrico, VA
March 6, 2026; 1:30 p.m., USA App	(5)	vs. (4) Davidson; Quarterfinals	L 59–64	20–11	23 – Snead	8 – Stinson	3 – Stokes	Henrico Sports & Events Center (2,116); Henrico, VA
*Non-conference game. ^{#}Rankings from AP Poll. (#) Tournament seedings in parentheses. All times are in Eastern.
