= 2025–26 VCU Rams women's basketball team =

American college basketball season

2025–26 VCU Rams women's basketball
- Conference: Atlantic 10 Conference
- Record: 8–23 (4–14 A-10)
- Head coach: Beth O'Boyle (fired February 2nd, 8–15 record; 12th season); Kirk Crawford (interim)
- Assistant coaches: Brittany Parker; Dylan Nsiah-Amoako; Taya Robinson
- Home arena: Siegel Center

2025–26 Atlantic 10 women's basketball standings
| | Conf. | | | | Overall |
| Team | W | | L | PCT | W | | L | PCT |
|---|---|---|---|---|---|---|---|---|
| Rhode Island † | 16 | – | 2 | .889 | 28 | – | 5 | .848 |
| George Mason | 16 | – | 2 | .889 | 23 | – | 10 | .697 |
| Richmond | 15 | – | 3 | .833 | 26 | – | 8 | .765 |
| Davidson | 12 | – | 6 | .667 | 21 | – | 12 | .636 |
| Saint Joseph's | 10 | – | 8 | .556 | 20 | – | 11 | .645 |
| La Salle | 10 | – | 8 | .556 | 19 | – | 14 | .576 |
| Dayton | 9 | – | 9 | .500 | 17 | – | 14 | .548 |
| Loyola Chicago | 9 | – | 9 | .500 | 16 | – | 18 | .471 |
| St. Bonaventure | 7 | – | 11 | .389 | 17 | – | 16 | .515 |
| George Washington | 7 | – | 11 | .389 | 18 | – | 18 | .500 |
| Saint Louis | 5 | – | 13 | .278 | 12 | – | 21 | .364 |
| Duquesne | 4 | – | 14 | .222 | 12 | – | 19 | .387 |
| VCU | 4 | – | 14 | .222 | 8 | – | 23 | .258 |
| Fordham | 2 | – | 16 | .111 | 10 | – | 20 | .333 |
† 2026 A10 tournament winner

The 2025–26 VCU Rams women's basketball team represents Virginia Commonwealth University during the 2025–26 NCAA Division I women's basketball season. The Rams were led by 12th-year head coach Beth O'Boyle, prior to her February 2nd firing, with assistant coach Kirk Crawford being named interim head coach for the remainder of the season. They play their home games at the Siegel Center in Richmond, Virginia, as members of the Atlantic 10 Conference.

== Previous season ==
The Rams finished the 2024–25 season 12–19, 6–12 in A-10 play, to finish in 11th place. They were defeated by La Salle in the first round of the A-10 tournament.

== Preseason ==
On September 30, 2025, the Atlantic 10 Conference released their preseason poll. VCU was picked to finish seventh in the conference.

=== Preseason rankings ===
Atlantic 10 Preseason Poll
| Place | Team | Votes |
|---|---|---|
| 1 | Richmond | 188 (9) |
| 2 | George Mason | 185 (4) |
| 3 | Davidson | 167 (1) |
| 4 | Rhode Island | 137 |
| 5 | Dayton | 123 |
| 6 | Saint Joseph's | 120 |
| 7 | VCU | 110 |
| 8 | Duquesne | 95 |
| 9 | Saint Louis | 86 |
| 10 | George Washington | 75 |
| 11 | Fordham | 63 |
| 12 | La Salle | 56 |
| 13 | Loyola Chicago | 43 |
| 14 | St. Bonaventure | 22 |
(#) first-place votes

=== Preseason All-A10 Teams ===
Preseason All-A10 Teams
| Team | Player | Year | Position |
|---|---|---|---|
| First | Mary-Anna Asare | Senior | Guard |

=== Preseason All-A10 Defensive Team ===
No players were named to the Preseason All-A10 Defensive Team.

== Roster ==
2025–26 VCU Rams women's basketball team
Players
Coaches

| Pos. | # | Name | Height | Year | Previous school | Hometown |
|---|---|---|---|---|---|---|
| G | 0 | Ty Williams | 5 ft 7 in (1.7 m) | RS Sr | McNeese | New Orleans, Louisiana |
| G | 2 | Cyriah Griffin | 5 ft 7 in (1.7 m) | So | Menchville High School | Virginia Beach, Virginia |
| F | 5 | Makennah White | 6 ft 2 in (1.88 m) | Sr | Seton Hall | Farrell, Pennsylvania |
| F | 7 | Hawa Doumbouya | 6 ft 7 in (2.01 m) | RS So | Virginia | Bronx, New York |
| G | 8 | Daija Preston | 5 ft 7 in (1.7 m) | Fr | Carrollton High School | Douglasville, Georgia |
| F | 10 | Ann Zachariah | 6 ft 2 in (1.88 m) | RS Jr | Colorado State | Kerala, India |
| G | 11 | Mary-Anna Asare | 5 ft 8 in (1.73 m) | Sr | J. Addison School | Pickering, Ontario |
| G | 12 | Patricia Augustin | 5 ft 10 in (1.78 m) | Fr | Capital Courts Academy | Longueuil, Quebec |
| G/F | 14 | Tanya Tkachenko | 6 ft 2 in (1.88 m) | Sr | Herner TC | Berdiansk, Ukraine |
| G | 22 | Laia Crespín | 5 ft 5 in (1.65 m) | Fr | Barca CBS | Calafell, Spain |
| F | 31 | Isabel Whitelaw | 6 ft 3 in (1.91 m) | So | Shepparton Gators | Shepparton, Australia |
| F | 32 | Lucía Sotelo | 6 ft 1 in (1.85 m) | Jr | Ensino Lugo | Ourense, Spain |
| G/F | 34 | Katarina Kneževic | 6 ft 0 in (1.83 m) | So | Arizona | Belgrade, Serbia |
| F | 42 | Lucy Ghaifan | 6 ft 0 in (1.83 m) | Jr | Grand Canyon | Grand Island, Nebraska |

Head coach

- Beth O'Boyle (Gettysburg)

Assistant coach(es)

- Kirk Crawford (Western Colorado)
- Brittany Parker (St. Augustine's)
- Dylan Nsiah-Amoako (Georgia State)
- Taya Robinson (VCU)

Legend

- (C) Team captain
- (S) Suspended
- (I) Ineligible
- (W) Walk-on
- Injured
- Current redshirt

Roster
Last update: February 20, 2026

== Schedule and results ==
| Date time, TV | Rank^{#} | Opponent^{#} | Result | Record | High points | High rebounds | High assists | Site (attendance) city, state |
Regular season
| November 5, 2025*; 6:00 pm, ESPN+ | | Maryland Eastern Shore | W 62–48 | 1–0 | 23 – Asare | 7 – Tied | 3 – Asare | Siegel Center (460); Richmond, VA |
| November 9, 2025*; 2:00 pm, YouTube | | vs. Villanova | L 40–74 | 1–1 | 13 – Asare | 4 – Tied | 2 – Preston | Mattamy Athletic Centre; Toronto, ON |
| November 14, 2025*; 7:00 pm, MASN/ESPN+ | | Maine | W 81–77 | 2–1 | 19 – Kneževic | 8 – Tied | 4 – Kneževic | Siegel Center (814); Richmond, VA |
| November 17, 2025*; 6:00 pm, ESPN+ | | Howard | W 69–66 | 3–1 | 25 – Asare | 11 – Ghaifan | 5 – Griffin | Siegel Center (612); Richmond, VA |
| November 22, 2025*; 11:30 pm, BallerTV | | vs. Texas A&M; North Shore Showcase | L 66−78 | 3−2 | 24 – Asare | 6 – Kneževic | 2 – Asare | George Q. Cannon Activities Center (370); Lāʻie, HI |
| November 24, 2025*; 7:30 pm, BallerTV | | vs. Colorado; North Shore Showcase | L 58−69 | 3−3 | 20 – Kneževic | 5 – Doumbouya | 5 – Williams | George Q. Cannon Activities Center (254); Lāʻie, HI |
| November 25, 2025*; 9:30 pm, BallerTV | | vs. UT Arlington; North Shore Showcase | L 39–61 | 3–4 | 11 – Williams | 5 – Doumbouya | 3 – Williams | George Q. Cannon Activities Center (278); Lāʻie, HI |
| December 3, 2025; 6:30 pm, ESPN+ | | at La Salle | L 62–70 | 3–5 (0–1) | 16 – Griffin | 9 – Augustin | 3 – Tied | John Glaser Arena (380); Philadelphia, PA |
| December 7, 2025*; 2:00 pm, ESPN+ | | at James Madison | L 63–81 | 3–6 | 14 – Tied | 7 – Augustin | 3 – Tied | Atlantic Union Bank Center (2,170); Harrisonburg, VA |
| December 13, 2025*; 2:00 pm, ESPN+ | | at Temple | L 63–88 | 3–7 | 21 – Kneževic | 6 – Preston | 6 – Preston | Liacouras Center (1,393); Philadelphia, PA |
| December 16, 2025*; 6:00 pm, ESPN+ | | American | W 69–63 | 4–7 | 16 – Ghaifan | 6 – Tied | 6 – Crespín | Siegel Center (1,150); Richmond, VA |
| December 19, 2025*; 7:00 pm, ESPN+ | | vs. Georgia; 4 Tha Culture Holiday Classic | L 53−72 | 4−8 | 15 – Augustin | 9 – Preston | 4 – Kneževic | Henrico Sports & Events Center (273); Henrico, VA |
| December 20, 2025*; 3:30 pm, ESPN+ | | vs. Penn State; 4 Tha Culture Holiday Classic | L 66–78 | 4–9 | 17 – Preston | 8 – Kneževic | 4 – Crespín | Henrico Sports & Events Center (553); Henrico, VA |
| December 31, 2025; 2:00 pm, ESPN+ | | at Saint Joseph's | L 45–55 | 4–10 (0–2) | 20 – Asare | 4 – Tied | 2 – Preston | Hagan Arena (942); Philadelphia, PA |
| January 4, 2026; 12:00 pm, CBSSN | | George Mason; Rivalry | L 58–68 | 4–11 (0–3) | 16 – Asare | 7 – Augustin | 2 – Tied | Siegel Center (504); Richmond, VA |
| January 7, 2026; 8:00 pm, ESPN+ | | at Saint Louis | W 50–39 | 5–11 (1–3) | 11 – Augustin | 11 – White | 5 – Crespín | Chaifetz Arena (646); St. Louis, MO |
| January 11, 2026; 2:00 pm, CBSSN | | Duquesne | W 61–54 | 6–11 (2–3) | 14 – Crespín | 7 – Kneževic | 4 – Griffin | Siegel Center (995); Richmond, VA |
| January 14, 2026; 6:00 pm, ESPN+ | | Rhode Island | L 41–46 | 6–12 (2–4) | 12 – White | 7 – Crespín | 6 – Crespín | Siegel Center (313); Richmond, VA |
| January 18, 2026; 12:00 pm, CBSSN | | at Richmond; Capital City Classic | L 47–77 | 6–13 (2–5) | 15 – Griffin | 6 – Ghaifan | 5 – Preston | Robins Center (5,224); Richmond, VA |
| January 21, 2026; 6:00 pm, ESPN+ | | George Washington | W 63–60 | 7–13 (3–5) | 18 – Griffin | 7 – Kneževic | 5 – Preston | Siegel Center (413); Richmond, VA |
| January 24, 2026; 12:00 pm, ESPN+ | | at Davidson | L 51–66 | 7–14 (3–6) | 10 – Preston | 5 – Zachariah | 2 – Tied | John M. Belk Arena (1,044); Davidson, NC |
| January 28, 2026; 11:00 am, ESPN+ | | Fordham | W 69–58 | 8–14 (4–6) | 14 – Ghaifan | 8 – Griffin | 6 – Griffin | Siegel Center (319); Richmond, VA |
| February 1, 2026; 12:00 pm, ESPNU | | Richmond; Capital City Classic | L 65–77 | 8–15 (4–7) | 22 – Kneževic | 8 – Ghaifan | 4 – Griffin | Siegel Center (5,373); Richmond, VA |
| February 7, 2026; 3:00 pm, ESPN+ | | at Loyola Chicago | L 55–66 | 8–16 (4–8) | 12 – Ghaifan | 10 – Ghaifan | 4 – Crespín | Joseph J. Gentile Arena (834); Chicago, IL |
| February 11, 2026; 6:00 pm, ESPN+ | | at Rhode Island | L 42–85 | 8–17 (4–9) | 8 – White | 10 – Kneževic | 2 – Tied | Ryan Center (1,072); Kingston, RI |
| February 14, 2026; 1:00 pm, ESPN+ | | St. Bonaventure | L 53–64 | 8–18 (4–10) | 18 – Kneževic | 10 – Kneževic | 3 – Tied | Siegel Center (1,520); Richmond, VA |
| February 18, 2026; 6:00 pm, ESPN+ | | Davidson | L 39–66 | 8–19 (4–11) | 10 – Kneževic | 9 – Kneževic | 2 – Kneževic | Siegel Center (341); Richmond, VA |
| February 21, 2026; 2:00 pm, ESPN+ | | at Duquesne | L 61–72 | 8–20 (4–12) | 14 – Griffin | 10 – Kneževic | 4 – Crespín | UPMC Cooper Fieldhouse (988); Pittsburgh, PA |
| February 25, 2026; 6:00 pm, ESPN+ | | La Salle | L 54–71 | 8–21 (4–13) | 14 – Kneževic | 13 – Kneževic | 3 – Tied | Siegel Center (1,003); Richmond, VA |
| February 28, 2026; 1:00 pm, ESPN+ | | at Dayton | L 62–79 | 8–22 (4–14) | 13 – Sotelo | 8 – Kneževic | 4 – Tied | UD Arena (2,263); Dayton, OH |
A-10 tournament
| March 4, 2026; 12:00 p.m., ESPN+ | (13) | vs. (12) Duquesne; First round | L 52–60 | 8–23 | 14 – White | 8 – Kneževic | 3 – Tied | Henrico Sports & Events Center (1,181); Henrico, VA |
*Non-conference game. ^{#}Rankings from AP Poll. (#) Tournament seedings in parentheses. All times are in Eastern.
