= 2025–26 Dayton Flyers women's basketball team =

American college basketball season

2025–26 Dayton Flyers women's basketball
- Conference: Atlantic 10 Conference
- Record: 17–14 (9–9 A-10)
- Head coach: Tamika Williams-Jeter (4th season)
- Assistant coaches: Kalisha Keane; Bryce Agler; Darryl Hudson; Trendale Perkins; Tari Cummings-Baker
- Home arena: UD Arena

2025–26 Atlantic 10 women's basketball standings
	Conf.				Overall
Team	W		L	PCT	W		L	PCT
Rhode Island †	16	–	2	.889	28	–	5	.848
George Mason	16	–	2	.889	23	–	10	.697
Richmond	15	–	3	.833	26	–	8	.765
Davidson	12	–	6	.667	21	–	12	.636
Saint Joseph's	10	–	8	.556	20	–	11	.645
La Salle	10	–	8	.556	19	–	14	.576
Dayton	9	–	9	.500	17	–	14	.548
Loyola Chicago	9	–	9	.500	16	–	18	.471
St. Bonaventure	7	–	11	.389	17	–	16	.515
George Washington	7	–	11	.389	18	–	18	.500
Saint Louis	5	–	13	.278	12	–	21	.364
Duquesne	4	–	14	.222	12	–	19	.387
VCU	4	–	14	.222	8	–	23	.258
Fordham	2	–	16	.111	10	–	20	.333
† 2026 A10 tournament winner

The 2025–26 Dayton Flyers women's basketball team represented the University of Dayton during the 2025–26 NCAA Division I women's basketball season. The Flyers, led by fourth-year head coach Tamika Williams-Jeter, played their home games at UD Arena in Dayton, Ohio, as members of the Atlantic 10 Conference.

== Previous season ==
The Flyers finished the 2024–25 season 18–13, 11–7 in A-10 play, to finish in a three-way tie for fifth place. They defeated La Salle, before falling to Davidson in the quarterfinals of the A-10 tournament.

== Preseason ==
On September 30, 2025, the Atlantic 10 Conference released their preseason poll. Dayton was picked to finish fifth in the conference.

=== Preseason rankings ===
Atlantic 10 Preseason Poll
Place	Team	Votes
1	Richmond	188 (9)
2	George Mason	185 (4)
3	Davidson	167 (1)
4	Rhode Island	137
5	Dayton	123
6	Saint Joseph's	120
7	VCU	110
8	Duquesne	95
9	Saint Louis	86
10	George Washington	75
11	Fordham	63
12	La Salle	56
13	Loyola Chicago	43
14	St. Bonaventure	22
(#) first-place votes

=== Preseason All-A10 Teams ===
Preseason All-A10 Teams
Team	Player	Year	Position
Third	Nicole Stephens	Graduate Student	Guard

=== Preseason All-A10 Defensive Team ===
No players were named to the Preseason All-A10 Defensive Team.

== Roster ==
2025–26 Dayton Flyers women's basketball team
Players
Coaches

Pos.	#	Name	Height	Year	Previous school	Hometown
G	0	Maliyah Johnson	6 ft 1 in (1.85 m)	GS	Houston	Columbus, Ohio
G	1	Nayo Lear	5 ft 10 in (1.78 m)	Sr	Example Sports Academy	South Holland, Illinois
G	4	Shantavia Dawkins	5 ft 8 in (1.73 m)	Sr	Iowa State	Brampton, Ontario
G	5	Jordyn Poole	5 ft 7 in (1.7 m)	So	Purdue	Fort Wayne, Indiana
G	7	Olivia Leung	5 ft 10 in (1.78 m)	So	Crestwood Prep	Calgary, Alberta
C	10	Fatima Ibrahim	6 ft 3 in (1.91 m)	Jr	North Dakota	Winnipeg, Manitoba
G	12	Jayda Johnson	6 ft 1 in (1.85 m)	Jr	Boston College	West Haven, Connecticut
G/F	14	Ajok Madol	6 ft 3 in (1.91 m)	Jr	Minnesota	Regina, Saskatchewan
F	15	M.G. Talle	6 ft 2 in (1.88 m)	Fr	Félix-Leclerc Secondary School	Terrebonne, Quebec
G	21	Nicole Stephens	5 ft 7 in (1.7 m)	GS	Columbia	Pickerington, Ohio
G	24	Kamryn Grant	6 ft 0 in (1.83 m)	So	Columbus Africentric Early College	Columbus, Ohio
F/C	35	Molly O'Riordan	6 ft 2 in (1.88 m)	So	Barrington High School	Barrington, Illinois
G	42	Eleanor Monyek	6 ft 0 in (1.83 m)	Sr	Hinsdale Central High School	Clarendon Hills, Illinois

Head coach

- Tamika Williams-Jeter (Connecticut)

Assistant coach(es)

- Kalisha Keane (Michigan State)
- Bryce Agler (Wittenberg)
- Darryl Hudson (Howard)
- Trendale Perkins (Ohio)
- Tari Cummings-Baker (Oklahoma State)

Legend

- (C) Team captain
- (S) Suspended
- (I) Ineligible
- (W) Walk-on
- Injured
- Current redshirt

Roster
Last update: February 18, 2026

== Schedule and results ==
Date time, TV	Rank^{#}	Opponent^{#}	Result	Record	High points	High rebounds	High assists	Site (attendance) city, state
Regular season
November 3, 2025*; 7:30 pm, ESPN+		at Illinois State	L 76–87	0–1	22 – Lear	7 – Ibrahim	4 – Tied	CEFCU Arena; Normal, IL
November 6, 2025*; 7:00 pm, ESPN+		Mercyhurst	W 86–44	1–1	20 – Lear	9 – Tied	6 – Stephens	UD Arena (2,088); Dayton, OH
November 11, 2025*; 6:30 pm, ESPN+		at Xavier; Blackburn/McCafferty Trophy	W 71–66	2–1	14 – Tied	13 – O'Riordan	6 – Stephens	Cintas Center (689); Cincinnati, OH
November 16, 2025*; 1:00 pm, ESPN+		Belmont	L 66–72	2–2	17 – Ibrahim	11 – Ibrahim	4 – Stephens	UD Arena (2,171); Dayton, OH
November 21, 2025*; 7:00 pm, ESPN+		Canisius	W 61–52	3–2	19 – Lear	7 – Tied	4 – Lear	UD Arena (2,050); Dayton, OH
November 28, 2025*; 5:00 pm, Ion		vs. Butler; Fort Myers Tip-Off Island Division	L 66−92	3−3	17 – Madol	6 – Ibrahim	4 – Madol	Suncoast Credit Union Arena (927); Fort Myers, FL
November 29, 2025*; 7:30 pm, Ion		vs. Kansas; Fort Myers Tip-Off Island Division	W 59−58	4−3	16 – Lear	8 – Ibrahim	5 – Stephens	Suncoast Credit Union Arena (932); Fort Myers, FL
December 3, 2025; 6:00 pm, ESPN+		at George Washington	L 42–54	4–4 (0–1)	10 – Talle	7 – Ibrahim	4 – Stephens	Charles E. Smith Center (531); Washington, D.C.
December 7, 2025*; 1:00 pm, ESPN+		LIU	W 81–72	5–4	24 – Lear	7 – Tied	6 – Lear	UD Arena (1,748); Dayton, OH
December 14, 2025*; 12:00 pm, B1G+		at Purdue	L 43–80	5–5	9 – Stephens	6 – Tied	2 – Stephens	Mackey Arena (5,024); West Lafayette, IN
December 18, 2025*; 6:30 pm, ESPN+		at Western Michigan	W 65–58	6–5	17 – Lear	8 – Talle	6 – Stephens	University Arena (655); Kalamazoo, MI
December 21, 2025*; 1:00 pm, ESPN+		Evansville	W 75–66	7–5	27 – Lear	10 – Madol	3 – J. Johnson	UD Arena (1,904); Dayton, OH
December 31, 2025; 12:00 pm, ESPN+		at George Mason	L 59−74	7−6 (0–2)	16 – O'Riordan	9 – O'Riordan	6 – Stephens	EagleBank Arena (4,123); Fairfax, VA
January 3, 2026; 1:00 pm, ESPN+		Duquesne	W 68–61	8–6 (1–2)	23 – O'Riordan	9 – Stephens	7 – Stephens	UD Arena (2,131); Dayton, OH
January 7, 2026; 7:00 pm, ESPN+		Loyola Chicago	L 68–71	8–7 (1–3)	14 – Madol	7 – Madol	4 – Lear	UD Arena (1,881); Dayton, OH
January 10, 2026; 2:00 pm, ESPN+		at Fordham	W 66–58	9–7 (2–3)	30 – Lear	11 – Ibrahim	4 – Lear	Rose Hill Gymnasium (239); Bronx, NY
January 14, 2026; 7:00 pm, ESPN+		Richmond	L 67–85	9–8 (2–4)	18 – Stephens	9 – Talle	1 – Tied	UD Arena (2,437); Dayton, OH
January 18, 2026; 3:00 pm, ESPN+		at Saint Louis	L 58–62	9–9 (2–5)	17 – Lear	7 – Leung	2 – Tied	Chaifetz Arena (890); St. Louis, MO
January 21, 2026; 6:00 pm, ESPN+		at Duquesne	W 75–58	10–9 (3–5)	15 – Leung	8 – Tied	6 – Leung	UPMC Cooper Fieldhouse (788); Pittsburgh, PA
January 25, 2026; 2:00 pm, CBSSN		Rhode Island	L 66–79	10–10 (3–6)	13 – Tied	9 – Ibrahim	4 – Stephens	UD Arena (1,652); Dayton, OH
January 28, 2026; 7:00 pm, ESPN+		St. Bonaventure	W 75–71	11–10 (4–6)	20 – Leung	15 – O'Riordan	4 – Tied	UD Arena (2,319); Dayton, OH
February 1, 2026; 2:00 pm, USA		George Washington	L 54–66	11–11 (4–7)	15 – Stephens	9 – O'Riordan	4 – Stephens	UD Arena (2,650); Dayton, OH
February 4, 2026; 6:30 pm, ESPN+		at La Salle	W 68–60	12–11 (5–7)	16 – O'Riordan	8 – Madol	5 – Stephens	John Glaser Arena (235); Philadelphia, PA
February 7, 2026; 2:00 pm, ESPN+		at Saint Joseph's	W 75–73	13–11 (6–7)	18 – Stephens	9 – O'Riordan	7 – Lear	Hagan Arena (1,050); Philadelphia, PA
February 11, 2026; 11:00 am, ESPN+		George Mason	L 61–72	13–12 (6–8)	16 – Stephens	9 – Madol	2 – Stephens	UD Arena (12,598); Dayton, OH
February 14, 2026; 1:00 pm, ESPN+		Saint Louis	W 65–63	14–12 (7–8)	21 – Lear	8 – Madol	4 – Stephens	UD Arena (2,059); Dayton, OH
February 21, 2026; 1:00 pm, ESPN+		at Davidson	L 67–79	14–13 (7–9)	14 – O'Riordan	9 – Madol	3 – Tied	John M. Belk Arena (823); Davidson, NC
February 25, 2026; 7:00 pm, ESPN+		at Loyola Chicago	W 67–58	15–13 (8–9)	15 – O'Riordan	11 – Lear	5 – Lear	Joseph J. Gentile Arena (804); Chicago, IL
February 28, 2026; 1:00 pm, ESPN+		VCU	W 79–62	16–13 (9–9)	17 – Madol	11 – Ibrahim	4 – Tied	UD Arena (2,263); Dayton, OH
A-10 tournament
March 5, 2026; 5:00 p.m., ESPN+	(7)	vs. (10) George Washington; Second round	W 62–54	17–13	14 – Tied	7 – O'Riordan	4 – Stephens	Henrico Sports & Events Center (1,273); Henrico, VA
March 6, 2026; 5:00 p.m., USA	(7)	vs. (2) George Mason; Quarterfinals	L 85-87 ^{OT}	17–14	18 – Ibrahim	8 – Lear	6 – Lear	Henrico Sports & Events Center; Henrico, VA
*Non-conference game. ^{#}Rankings from AP Poll. (#) Tournament seedings in parentheses. All times are in Eastern.
