= 2025–26 Davidson Wildcats women's basketball team =

American college basketball season

2025–26 Davidson Wildcats women's basketball
- Conference: Atlantic 10 Conference
- Record: 21-12 (12–6 A-10)
- Head coach: Gayle Fulks (9th season)
- Associate head coach: James Janssen
- Assistant coaches: Jasmine Jenkins; Laura Barry; Ryan Bauder
- Home arena: John M. Belk Arena

2025–26 Atlantic 10 women's basketball standings
	Conf.				Overall
Team	W		L	PCT	W		L	PCT
Rhode Island †	16	–	2	.889	28	–	5	.848
George Mason	16	–	2	.889	23	–	10	.697
Richmond	15	–	3	.833	26	–	8	.765
Davidson	12	–	6	.667	21	–	12	.636
Saint Joseph's	10	–	8	.556	20	–	11	.645
La Salle	10	–	8	.556	19	–	14	.576
Dayton	9	–	9	.500	17	–	14	.548
Loyola Chicago	9	–	9	.500	16	–	18	.471
St. Bonaventure	7	–	11	.389	17	–	16	.515
George Washington	7	–	11	.389	18	–	18	.500
Saint Louis	5	–	13	.278	12	–	21	.364
Duquesne	4	–	14	.222	12	–	19	.387
VCU	4	–	14	.222	8	–	23	.258
Fordham	2	–	16	.111	10	–	20	.333
† 2026 A10 tournament winner

The 2025–26 Davidson Wildcats women's basketball team represents Davidson College during the 2025–26 NCAA Division I women's basketball season. The Wildcats, led by ninth-year head coach Gayle Fulks, play their home games at the John M. Belk Arena in Davidson, North Carolina as members of the Atlantic 10 Conference.

== Previous season ==
The Wildcats finished the 2024–25 season 19–14, 13–5 in A-10 play, to finish in third place. They defeated Dayton, before falling to eventual tournament champions George Mason in the semifinals of the A-10 tournament. They received an at-large bid to the WBIT, where they would be defeated by James Madison in the first round.

== Preseason ==
On September 30, 2025, the Atlantic 10 Conference released their preseason poll. Davidson was picked to finish third in the conference, with one first-place vote.

=== Preseason rankings ===
Atlantic 10 Preseason Poll
Place	Team	Votes
1	Richmond	188 (9)
2	George Mason	185 (4)
3	Davidson	167 (1)
4	Rhode Island	137
5	Dayton	123
6	Saint Joseph's	120
7	VCU	110
8	Duquesne	95
9	Saint Louis	86
10	George Washington	75
11	Fordham	63
12	La Salle	56
13	Loyola Chicago	43
14	St. Bonaventure	22
(#) first-place votes

=== Preseason All-A10 Teams ===
Preseason All-A10 Teams
Team	Player	Year	Position
First	Charlise Dunn	Senior	Guard
Second	Katie Donovan	Junior	Guard
Third	Candice Lienafa	Sophomore	Forward

=== Preseason All-A10 Defensive Team ===
Preseason All-A10 Defensive Team
Player	Year	Position
Charlise Dunn	Senior	Guard

== Roster ==
2025–26 Davidson Wildcats women's basketball team
Players
Coaches

Pos.	#	Name	Height	Year	Previous school	Hometown
F	0	Eliza Buerk	6 ft 3 in (1.91 m)	Jr	Clackamas High School	Portland, Oregon
G	3	Jasmine Timmerson	5 ft 7 in (1.7 m)	Jr	Pittsburgh	Wexford, Pennsylvania
G	4	Elena Alvarez Castellanos	5 ft 6 in (1.68 m)	Fr	Colegio Miravalles-El Redin	Pamplona, Spain
G	7	Katie Donovan	5 ft 11 in (1.8 m)	Jr	Southport State High School	Gold Coast, Australia
F	10	Ines Garcia Monje	6 ft 2 in (1.88 m)	Fr	Instituto Joaquim Blume	Santa Cruz de Tenerife, Spain
G	11	Angeliki Ziaka	5 ft 9 in (1.75 m)	So	San Francisco	Athens, Greece
G	13	Sienna Dauer	5 ft 11 in (1.8 m)	So	IMG Academy	Bradenton, Florida
G	14	Kyra Bruyndoncx	5 ft 11 in (1.8 m)	So	Topsportschool Antwerpen	Mol, Belgium
F	17	Candice Lienafa	5 ft 11 in (1.8 m)	So	Champlain College Saint-Lambert	Ducos, Martinique
G	21	Charlise Dunn	6 ft 2 in (1.88 m)	Sr	Virginia Tech	Vermont, Australia
G	22	Sylvie Jackson	6 ft 0 in (1.83 m)	Jr	Louisa County High School	Zion Crossroads, Virginia
F	23	Asha Nightingale	6 ft 1 in (1.85 m)	Fr	Casey Cavaliers	Melbourne, Australia
C	26	Edina Strausz	6 ft 3 in (1.91 m)	So	Winston-Salem Christian School	Budapest, Hungary
G	33	Stephanie Gutierrez-Rodriguez	5 ft 6 in (1.68 m)	So	Coleville High School	South Lake Tahoe, California
G	44	Emilie Bessell	5 ft 9 in (1.75 m)	So	Redlands College	Sydney, Australia

Head coach

- Gayle Fulks (Fairleigh Dickinson)

Assistant coach(es)

- James Janssen (Deakin)
- Jasmine Jenkins (Vanderbilt)
- Laura Barry (North Carolina)
- Ryan Bauder (Wake Forest)

Legend

- (C) Team captain
- (S) Suspended
- (I) Ineligible
- (W) Walk-on
- Injured
- Current redshirt

Roster
Last update: February 16, 2026

== Schedule and results ==
Date time, TV	Rank^{#}	Opponent^{#}	Result	Record	High points	High rebounds	High assists	Site (attendance) city, state
Exhibition
October 29, 2025*; 7:00 pm		Wingate	W 70–55	–	–	–	–	John M. Belk Arena; Davidson, NC
Regular season
November 3, 2025*; 7:30 pm, SECN+		at Mississippi State	L 57–66	0–1	11 – Tied	6 – Garcia Monje	4 – Donovan	Humphrey Coliseum (3,462); Starkville, MS
November 6, 2025*; 7:00 pm, ESPN+		William & Mary	W 71–50	1–1	18 – Bruyndoncx	5 – Dunn	5 – Garcia Monje	John M. Belk Arena (795); Davidson, NC
November 8, 2025*; 7:00 pm, ESPN+		at Florida Gulf Coast	W 77–51	2–1	20 – Tied	8 – Tied	3 – Garcia Monje	Alico Arena (1,573); Fort Myers, FL
November 12, 2025*; 6:30 pm, ESPN+		at Appalachian State	W 74–55	3–1	19 – Bessell	9 – Dunn	3 – Tied	Holmes Center (489); Boone, NC
November 16, 2025*; 1:00 pm, ESPN+		Iona	W 82–52	4–1	23 – Donovan	7 – Dunn	6 – Garcia Monje	John M. Belk Arena (795); Davidson, NC
November 20, 2025*; 6:00 pm, ESPNU		vs. Miami (FL); WBCA Showcase	L 58−66	4−2	14 – Dunn	6 – Tied	4 – Lienafa	State Farm Field House; Kissimmee, FL
November 22, 2025*; 5:30 pm, ESPN+		vs. No. 7 Baylor; WBCA Showcase	L 72−74 ^{OT}	4−3	33 – Dunn	11 – Dunn	2 – Tied	State Farm Field House; Kissimmee, FL
November 30, 2025*; 1:00 pm, ESPN+		Ohio	W 64–59	5–3	17 – Dunn	12 – Dunn	4 – Dunn	John M. Belk Arena (835); Davidson, NC
December 3, 2025; 7:00 pm, ESPN+		Duquesne	W 72–55	6–3 (1–0)	19 – Donovan	11 – Dunn	5 – Dunn	John M. Belk Arena (716); Davidson, NC
December 7, 2025*; 4:30 pm, ESPN+		Ball State	W 87–65	7–3	28 – Donovan	6 – Strausz	6 – Dunn	John M. Belk Arena (819); Davidson, NC
December 14, 2025*; 7:00 pm, ESPN+		at Charlotte	L 61–71	7–4	16 – Donovan	5 – Tied	4 – Tied	Halton Arena (475); Charlotte, NC
December 17, 2025*; 7:00 pm, ESPN+		High Point	W 76–65	8–4	20 – Garcia Monje	10 – Dunn	5 – Garcia Monje	John M. Belk Arena (737); Davidson, NC
December 19, 2025*; 11:00 am, ESPN+		Morgan State	W 78−34	9−4	14 – Lienafa	9 – Strausz	5 – Alvarez Castellanos	John M. Belk Arena (3,083); Davidson, NC
December 21, 2025*; 12:00 pm, CBSSN		NC State	L 59–68	9–5	21 – Dunn	9 – Strausz	5 – Alvarez Castellanos	John M. Belk Arena (1,521); Davidson, NC
December 31, 2025; 3:00 pm, ESPN+		at Loyola Chicago	W 62–50	10–5 (2–0)	18 – Donovan	13 – Dunn	4 – Timmerson	Joseph J. Gentile Arena (317); Chicago, IL
January 3, 2026; 2:00 pm, ESPN+		at Saint Louis	W 71–55	11–5 (3–0)	17 – Tied	6 – Dunn	4 – Timmerson	Chaifetz Arena (866); St. Louis, MO
January 7, 2026; 6:00 pm, ESPN+		Saint Joseph's	W 48–36	12–5 (4–0)	10 – Tied	13 – Dunn	3 – Timmerson	John M. Belk Arena (742); Davidson, NC
January 10, 2026; 6:00 pm, ESPN+		at Richmond	L 84–91 ^{3OT}	12–6 (4–1)	27 – Donovan	11 – Dunn	8 – Garcia Monje	Robins Center (2,207); Richmond, VA
January 14, 2026; 7:00 pm, ESPN+		Fordham	W 74–50	13–6 (5–1)	17 – Strausz	6 – Lienafa	4 – Tied	John M. Belk Arena (770); Davidson, NC
January 18, 2026; 1:00 pm, ESPN+		at La Salle	W 62–58	14–6 (6–1)	13 – Donovan	6 – Tied	5 – Alvarez Castellanos	John Glaser Arena (123); Philadelphia, PA
January 21, 2026; 6:00 pm, ESPN+		at Rhode Island	L 53–60	14–7 (6–2)	17 – Bruyndoncx	4 – Tied	5 – Alvarez Castellanos	Ryan Center (1,123); Kingston, RI
January 24, 2026; 12:00 pm, ESPN+		VCU	W 66–51	15–7 (7–2)	18 – Bruyndoncx	12 – Dunn	3 – Garcia Monje	John M. Belk Arena (1,044); Davidson, NC
January 28, 2026; 7:00 pm, ESPN+		George Mason	L 51–62	15–8 (7–3)	18 – Donovan	11 – Dunn	3 – Bruyndoncx	John M. Belk Arena (786); Davidson, NC
February 1, 2026; 1:00 pm, ESPN+		at Saint Joseph's	L 51–59	15–9 (7–4)	21 – Dunn	11 – Dunn	4 – Alvarez Castellanos	Hagan Arena (1,054); Philadelphia, PA
February 4, 2026; 6:00 pm, ESPN+		at St. Bonaventure	L 50–59	15–10 (7–5)	18 – Dunn	10 – Dunn	2 – Tied	Reilly Center (395); St. Bonaventure, NY
February 7, 2026; 1:00 pm, ESPN+		George Washington	W 68–58	16–10 (8–5)	31 – Dunn	8 – Garcia Monje	6 – Alvarez Castellanos	John M. Belk Arena (951); Davidson, NC
February 14, 2026; 1:00 pm, ESPN+		Richmond	L 43–65	16–11 (8–6)	12 – Alvarez Castellanos	7 – Garcia Monje	3 – Dunn	John M. Belk Arena (1,348); Davidson, NC
February 18, 2026; 6:00 pm, ESPN+		at VCU	W 66–39	17–11 (9–6)	14 – Donovan	9 – Garcia Monje	4 – Alvarez Castellanos	Siegel Center (341); Richmond, VA
February 21, 2026; 1:00 pm, ESPN+		Dayton	W 79–67	18–11 (10–6)	18 – Donovan	7 – Dunn	4 – Timmerson	John M. Belk Arena (823); Davidson, NC
February 25, 2026; 6:00 pm, ESPN+		at Fordham	W 58–49	19–11 (11–6)	22 – Dunn	7 – Garcia Monje	4 – Garcia Monje	Rose Hill Gymnasium (376); Bronx, NY
February 28, 2026; 1:00 pm, ESPN+		Saint Louis	W 74–62	20–11 (12–6)	24 – Donovan	9 – Ziaka	6 – Timmerson	John M. Belk Arena (1,249); Davidson, NC
A-10 tournament
March 6, 2026; 1:30 p.m., USA App	(4)	vs. (5) Saint Joseph's; Quarterfinals	W 64–59	21–11	13 – Donovan	6 – Garcia Monje	2 – Tied	Henrico Sports & Events Center (2,116); Henrico, VA
March 7, 2026; 11:00 a.m., CBSSN	(4)	vs. (1) Rhode Island; Semifinals	L 46-55	21-12	15 – Dunn	5 – Tied	2 – Alvarez Castellanos	Henrico Sports & Events Center; Henrico, VA
*Non-conference game. ^{#}Rankings from AP Poll. (#) Tournament seedings in parentheses. All times are in Eastern.
