= 2026 Atlantic 10 women's basketball tournament =

American college basketball postseason tournament

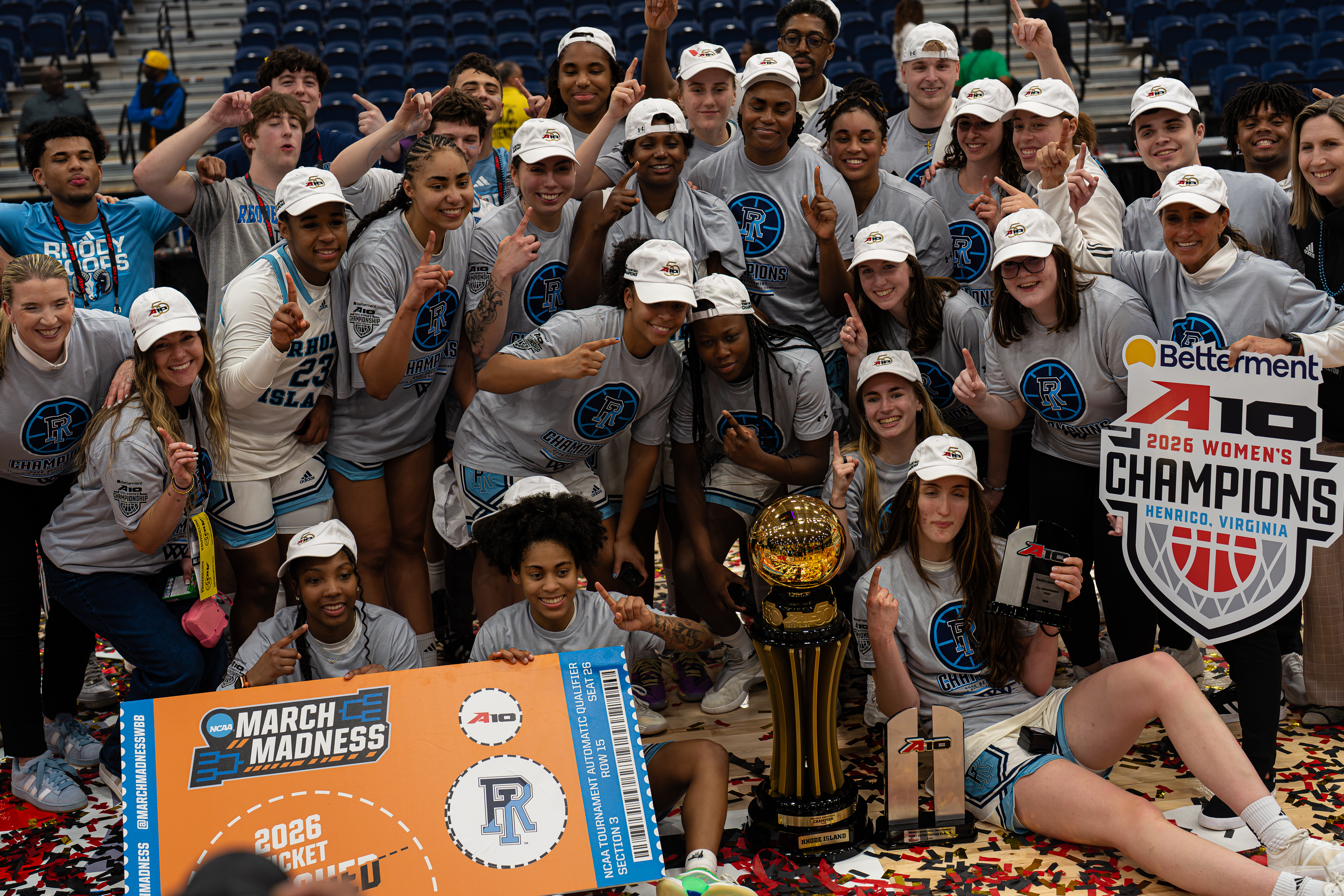
- 2026 Champions the Rhode Island Rams at the Henrico Sports & Events Center
- Classification: Division I
- Season: 2025–26
- Teams: 14
- Site: Henrico Sports & Events Center; Henrico, Virginia
- Champions: Rhode Island (1st title)
- Winning coach: Tammi Reiss (1st title)
- MVP: Albina Syla (Rhode Island)
- Attendance: 14,019
- Television: ESPN+, CNBC, CBSSN, ESPN2

2025–26 Atlantic 10 women's basketball standings
	Conf.				Overall
Team	W		L	PCT	W		L	PCT
Rhode Island †	16	–	2	.889	28	–	5	.848
George Mason	16	–	2	.889	23	–	10	.697
Richmond	15	–	3	.833	26	–	8	.765
Davidson	12	–	6	.667	21	–	12	.636
Saint Joseph's	10	–	8	.556	20	–	11	.645
La Salle	10	–	8	.556	19	–	14	.576
Dayton	9	–	9	.500	17	–	14	.548
Loyola Chicago	9	–	9	.500	16	–	18	.471
St. Bonaventure	7	–	11	.389	17	–	16	.515
George Washington	7	–	11	.389	18	–	18	.500
Saint Louis	5	–	13	.278	12	–	21	.364
Duquesne	4	–	14	.222	12	–	19	.387
VCU	4	–	14	.222	8	–	23	.258
Fordham	2	–	16	.111	10	–	20	.333
† 2026 A10 tournament winner

The 2026 Atlantic 10 women's basketball tournament was the postseason women's basketball tournament for the 2025–26 season of the Atlantic 10 Conference (A-10). It was held from March 4–8, 2026, in Henrico, Virginia, at the Henrico Sports & Events Center.

No. 1 Rhode Island defeated defending champions No. 2 George Mason 53–51 in the championship game, claiming their first conference title in program history and sending them to the NCAA tournament for the first time since 1996.

== Seeds ==
All 14 A-10 schools participated in the tournament. Teams were seeded by winning percentage within the conference, with a tiebreaker system to seed teams with identical percentages. The top ten teams received a first-round bye, and the top four teams received a double-bye, automatically advancing them to the quarterfinals.

Seed	School	Conference Record	Tiebreaker
1	Rhode Island	16–2	1–0 vs. George Mason
2	George Mason	16–2	0–1 vs. Rhode Island
3	Richmond	15–3	
4	Davidson	12–6	
5	Saint Joseph's	10–8	2–0 vs. La Salle
6	La Salle	10–8	0–2 vs. Saint Joseph's
7	Dayton	9–9	1–1 vs. Loyola Chicago; 2–0 vs. Saint Joseph's & La Salle
8	Loyola Chicago	9–9	1–1 vs. Dayton; 1–2 vs. Saint Joseph's & La Salle
9	St. Bonaventure	7–11	1–1 vs. George Washington; 0–2 vs. Rhode Island & George Mason
10	George Washington	7–11	1–1 vs. St. Bonaventure; 0–4 vs. Rhode Island & George Mason
11	Saint Louis	5–13	
12	Duquesne	4–14	1–1 vs. VCU; 0–2 vs. Rhode Island & George Mason
13	VCU	4–14	1–1 vs. Duquesne; 0–3 vs. Rhode Island & George Mason
14	Fordham	2–16	

== Schedule ==
Session	Game	Time	Matchup	Score	Television	Attendance
First round – Wednesday, March 4
1	1	Noon	No. 12 Duquesne vs. No. 13 VCU	60–52	ESPN+	1,181
1	2	2:30 p.m.	No. 11 Saint Louis vs. No. 14 Fordham	68–60	ESPN+	1,181
Second round – Thursday, March 5
2	3	11:00 a.m.	No. 8 Loyola Chicago vs. No. 9 St. Bonaventure	61−59	ESPN+	1,434
2	4	1:30 p.m.	No. 5 Saint Joseph's vs. No. 12 Duquesne	66−45	ESPN+	1,434
3	5	5:00 p.m.	No. 7 Dayton vs. No. 10 George Washington	62−54	ESPN+	1,273
3	6	7:30 p.m.	No. 6 La Salle vs. No. 11 Saint Louis	59–51	ESPN+	1,273
Quarterfinals – Friday, March 6
4	7	11:00 a.m.	No. 1 Rhode Island vs. No. 8 Loyola Chicago	71−64	USA Network	2,116
4	8	1:30 p.m.	No. 4 Davidson vs. No. 5 Saint Joseph's	64−59	USA App	2,116
5	9	5:00 p.m.	No. 2 George Mason vs. No. 7 Dayton	87–85^{OT}	USA Network	2,618
5	10	7:30 p.m.	No. 3 Richmond vs. No. 6 La Salle	70−51	CNBC	2,618
Semifinals – Saturday, March 7
6	11	11:00 a.m.	No. 1 Rhode Island vs. No. 4 Davidson	55−46	CBSSN	2,673
6	12	1:30 p.m.	No. 2 George Mason vs. No. 3 Richmond	60−45	CBSSN	2,673
Championship – Sunday, March 8
7	13	4:00 p.m.	No. 1 Rhode Island vs. No. 2 George Mason	53–51	ESPN2	2,724
Game times in EST. Rankings denote tournament seed

== Bracket ==
First round Wednesday, March 4 ESPN+
12	Duquesne	60
13	VCU	52
11	Saint Louis	68
14	Fordham	60

Second round Thursday, March 5 ESPN+
8	Loyola Chicago	61
9	St. Bonaventure	59
5	Saint Joseph's	66
12	Duquesne	45
7	Dayton	62
10	George Washington	54
6	La Salle	59
11	Saint Louis	51

Quarterfinals; Friday, March 6 USA Network//USA App/CNBC
1	Rhode Island	71
8	Loyola Chicago	64
4	Davidson	64
5	Saint Joseph's	59
2	George Mason	87*
7	Dayton	85
3	Richmond	70
6	La Salle	51

Semifinals; Saturday, March 7 CBSSN
1	Rhode Island	55
4	Davidson	46
2	George Mason	60
3	Richmond	45

Championship; Sunday, March 8 ESPN2
1	Rhode Island	53
2	George Mason	51

* denotes overtime period
