= 2025–26 Duquesne Dukes women's basketball team =

American college basketball season

2025–26 Duquesne Dukes women's basketball
- Conference: Atlantic 10 Conference
- Record: 12–19 (4–14 A-10)
- Head coach: Dan Burt (13th season)
- Assistant coaches: Brianna Thomas; Frank Ferraro; Rick Bell; RJ Bell; Michaela Porter
- Home arena: UPMC Cooper Fieldhouse

2025–26 Atlantic 10 women's basketball standings
	Conf.				Overall
Team	W		L	PCT	W		L	PCT
Rhode Island †	16	–	2	.889	28	–	5	.848
George Mason	16	–	2	.889	23	–	10	.697
Richmond	15	–	3	.833	26	–	8	.765
Davidson	12	–	6	.667	21	–	12	.636
Saint Joseph's	10	–	8	.556	20	–	11	.645
La Salle	10	–	8	.556	19	–	14	.576
Dayton	9	–	9	.500	17	–	14	.548
Loyola Chicago	9	–	9	.500	16	–	18	.471
St. Bonaventure	7	–	11	.389	17	–	16	.515
George Washington	7	–	11	.389	18	–	18	.500
Saint Louis	5	–	13	.278	12	–	21	.364
Duquesne	4	–	14	.222	12	–	19	.387
VCU	4	–	14	.222	8	–	23	.258
Fordham	2	–	16	.111	10	–	20	.333
† 2026 A10 tournament winner

The 2025–26 Duquesne Dukes women's basketball team represents Duquesne University during the 2025–26 NCAA Division I women's basketball season. The Dukes, led by 13th-year head coach Dan Burt, play their home games at the UPMC Cooper Fieldhouse in Pittsburgh, Pennsylvania, as members of the Atlantic 10 Conference.

== Previous season ==
The Dukes finished the 2024–25 season 21–13, 9–9 in A-10 play, to finish in a tie for eighth place. They defeated Fordham, before falling to top-seeded Richmond in the quarterfinals of the A-10 tournament. They received an at-large bid to the WNIT, where they would defeat Longwood in the first round, and Miami (OH) in the second round, before falling to Cleveland State in the Super 16.

== Preseason ==
On September 30, 2025, the Atlantic 10 Conference released their preseason poll. Duquesne was picked to finish eighth in the conference.

=== Preseason rankings ===
Atlantic 10 Preseason Poll
Place	Team	Votes
1	Richmond	188 (9)
2	George Mason	185 (4)
3	Davidson	167 (1)
4	Rhode Island	137
5	Dayton	123
6	Saint Joseph's	120
7	VCU	110
8	Duquesne	95
9	Saint Louis	86
10	George Washington	75
11	Fordham	63
12	La Salle	56
13	Loyola Chicago	43
14	St. Bonaventure	22
(#) first-place votes

=== Preseason All-A10 Teams ===
No players were named to the First, Second, or Third Preseason All-A10 Teams.

=== Preseason All-A10 Defensive Team ===
No players were named to the Preseason All-A10 Defensive Team.

== Roster ==
2025–26 Duquesne Dukes women's basketball team
Players
Coaches

Pos.	#	Name	Height	Year	Previous school	Hometown
F	0	Harriet Ford	6 ft 3 in (1.91 m)	So	Omaha	Perth, Australia
G	3	Faith Walker	6 ft 1 in (1.85 m)	So	West York High School	York, Pennsylvania
G	5	Fatou Sane	6 ft 0 in (1.83 m)	So	J. Addison School	Guédiawaye, Senegal
G	7	Reina Green	5 ft 9 in (1.75 m)	Jr	Pensacola State College	Fort Lauderdale, Florida
G/F	9	Dunja Zecevic	6 ft 2 in (1.88 m)	Jr	UTEP	Belgrade, Serbia
G	10	Gabby Grantham-Medley	5 ft 9 in (1.75 m)	RS So	North Hagerstown High School	Hagerstown, Maryland
G	11	Mackenzie Blackford	5 ft 8 in (1.73 m)	So	Solon High School	Solon, Ohio
G	12	Raymi Coueta	5 ft 8 in (1.73 m)	Jr	Cégep de Thetford	Cayenne, French Guiana
G	13	Bakhaw Seye	6 ft 4 in (1.93 m)	Fr	SEED Academy	Dakar, Senegal
C	14	Maja Rohkohl	6 ft 4 in (1.93 m)	So	Gardner–Webb	Hanover, Germany
G	20	Kellie McConnell	5 ft 3 in (1.6 m)	So	North Allegheny High School	Pittsburgh, Pennsylvania
G	23	Nadia Moore	5 ft 10 in (1.78 m)	So	J. Addison School	Washington, Pennsylvania
G	30	Alexis Bordas	5 ft 8 in (1.73 m)	Fr	Wheeling Park High School	Wheeling, West Virginia
F	44	Raevin Washington	6 ft 5 in (1.96 m)	Fr	Turner Ashby High School	Harrisonburg, Virginia

Head coach

- Dan Burt (West Liberty)

Assistant coach(es)

- Brianna Thomas (Duquesne)
- Frank Ferraro (Duquesne)
- Rick Bell (Pittsburgh)
- RJ Bell (Geneva)
- Michaela Porter (Appalachian State)

Legend

- (C) Team captain
- (S) Suspended
- (I) Ineligible
- (W) Walk-on
- Injured
- Current redshirt

Roster
Last update: February 21, 2026

== Schedule and results ==
Date time, TV	Rank^{#}	Opponent^{#}	Result	Record	High points	High rebounds	High assists	Site (attendance) city, state
Regular season
November 3, 2025*; 2:00 pm, ESPN+		Saint Francis	W 89–60	1–0	17 – Moore	11 – Grantham-Medley	4 – Walker	UPMC Cooper Fieldhouse (677); Pittsburgh, PA
November 6, 2025*; 6:00 pm, ESPN+		Slippery Rock	W 108–53	2–0	17 – Tied	9 – Rohkohl	4 – Walker	UPMC Cooper Fieldhouse (739); Pittsburgh, PA
November 9, 2025*; 1:00 pm, ESPN+		at Western Michigan	W 72–64	3–0	24 – Bordas	7 – Ford	3 – Tied	University Arena (765); Kalamazoo, MI
November 11, 2025*; 5:00 pm, ESPN+		West Liberty	W 102–73	4–0	19 – Zecevic	11 – Ford	4 – Bordas	UPMC Cooper Fieldhouse (722); Pittsburgh, PA
November 18, 2025*; 6:00 pm, ESPN+		at Robert Morris	L 62–64	4–1	16 – Blackford	10 – Ford	4 – Tied	UPMC Events Center (1,255); Moon Township, PA
November 24, 2025*; 6:00 pm, SNP/ESPN+		Kent State	W 58−53	5−1	19 – Blackford	10 – Ford	4 – Green	UPMC Cooper Fieldhouse (984); Pittsburgh, PA
November 29, 2025*; 3:30 pm, ESPN+		vs. Liberty; Navy Classic	L 60−67	5−2	23 – Bordas	8 – Washington	4 – Grantham-Medley	Alumni Hall (853); Annapolis, MD
November 30, 2025*; 1:00 pm, ESPN+		at Navy; Navy Classic	W 69–67 ^{OT}	6–2	18 – Bordas	14 – Ford	4 – Grantham-Medley	Alumni Hall; Annapolis, MD
December 3, 2025; 7:00 pm, ESPN+		at Davidson	L 55–72	6–3 (0–1)	14 – Grantham-Medley	7 – Ford	4 – Grantham-Medley	John M. Belk Arena (716); Davidson, NC
December 9, 2025*; 12:00 pm, ESPN+		at Eastern Michigan	L 72–74	6–4	17 – Grantham-Medley	6 – Ford	3 – Grantham-Medley	George Gervin GameAbove Center (1,228); Ypsilanti, MI
December 14, 2025*; 1:00 pm, FloCollege		at Stony Brook	L 39–52	6–5	10 – Bordas	9 – Rohkohl	1 – Tied	Stony Brook Arena (292); Stony Brook, NY
December 21, 2025*; 1:00 pm, SNP/ESPN+		Pittsburgh; City Game	W 84–69	7–5	38 – Bordas	9 – Ford	5 – Bordas	UPMC Cooper Fieldhouse (2,221); Pittsburgh, PA
December 31, 2025; 1:00 pm, ESPN+		Saint Louis	L 62−72	7−6 (0–2)	15 – Moore	6 – Tied	3 – Green	UPMC Cooper Fieldhouse (818); Pittsburgh, PA
January 3, 2026; 1:00 pm, ESPN+		at Dayton	L 61–68	7–7 (0–3)	18 – Moore	15 – Ford	2 – Tied	UD Arena (2,131); Dayton, OH
January 7, 2026; 6:00 pm, SNP/ESPN+		St. Bonaventure	L 38–46	7–8 (0–4)	11 – Bordas	12 – Ford	2 – Ford	UPMC Cooper Fieldhouse (660); Pittsburgh, PA
January 11, 2026; 2:00 pm, CBSSN		at VCU	L 54–61	7–9 (0–5)	25 – Bordas	11 – Ford	2 – Tied	Siegel Center (995); Richmond, VA
January 14, 2026; 6:00 pm, ESPN+		George Washington	L 45–59	7–10 (0–6)	20 – Bordas	5 – Sane	2 – Green	UPMC Cooper Fieldhouse (676); Pittsburgh, PA
January 18, 2026; 1:30 pm, USA		at Rhode Island	L 50–70	7–11 (0–7)	11 – Blackford	6 – Tied	3 – Blackford	Ryan Center (1,118); Kingston, RI
January 21, 2026; 6:00 pm, ESPN+		Dayton	L 58–75	7–12 (0–8)	16 – Bordas	6 – Bordas	2 – Tied	UPMC Cooper Fieldhouse (788); Pittsburgh, PA
January 24, 2026; 12:00 pm, ESPN+		Saint Joseph's	L 53–72	7–13 (0–9)	13 – Bordas	5 – Rohkohl	1 – Tied	UPMC Cooper Fieldhouse (850); Pittsburgh, PA
January 28, 2026; 6:00 pm, ESPN+		at Richmond	L 55–86	7–14 (0–10)	12 – Washington	10 – Rohkohl	5 – McConnell	Robins Center (1,241); Richmond, VA
January 31, 2026; 2:00 pm, SNP/ESPN+		La Salle	L 61–77	7–15 (0–11)	22 – Bordas	10 – Ford	2 – Tied	UPMC Cooper Fieldhouse (1,237); Pittsburgh, PA
February 7, 2026; 1:00 pm, ESPN+		at St. Bonaventure	L 71–72 ^{OT}	7–16 (0–12)	27 – Blackford	14 – Ford	3 – Grantham-Medley	Reilly Center (405); St. Bonaventure, NY
February 11, 2026; 11:00 am, ESPN+		Loyola Chicago	W 67–55	8–16 (1–12)	19 – Bordas	13 – Green	6 – Grantham-Medley	UPMC Cooper Fieldhouse (3,005); Pittsburgh, PA
February 14, 2026; 2:00 pm, ESPN+		at Fordham	W 80–67	9–16 (2–12)	23 – Blackford	11 – Washington	4 – Sane	Rose Hill Gymnasium; Bronx, NY
February 18, 2026; 7:00 pm, ESPN+		at Saint Joseph's	L 46–61	9–17 (2–13)	16 – Blackford	6 – Tied	3 – Bordas	Hagan Arena (1,059); Philadelphia, PA
February 21, 2026; 2:00 pm, SNP/ESPN+		VCU	W 72–61	10–17 (3–13)	27 – Bordas	9 – Green	5 – Blackford	UPMC Cooper Fieldhouse (988); Pittsburgh, PA
February 25, 2026; 8:00 pm, ESPN+		at Saint Louis	W 82–64	11–17 (4–13)	20 – Green	8 – Grantham-Medley	5 – Grantham-Medley	Chaifetz Arena (444); St. Louis, MO
February 28, 2026; 2:00 pm, ESPN+		George Mason	L 48–65	11–18 (4–14)	12 – Grantham-Medley	11 – Green	4 – Blackford	UPMC Cooper Fieldhouse (797); Pittsburgh, PA
A-10 tournament
March 4, 2026; 12:00 p.m., ESPN+	(12)	vs. (13) VCU; First round	W 60–52	12–18	24 – Bordas	9 – Washington	5 – Grantham-Medley	Henrico Sports & Events Center (1,181); Henrico, VA
March 5, 2026; 1:30 p.m., ESPN+	(12)	vs. (5) Saint Joseph's; Second round	L 45–66	12–19	13 – Bordas	9 – Green	3 – Grantham-Medley	Henrico Sports & Events Center (1,434); Henrico, VA
*Non-conference game. ^{#}Rankings from AP Poll. (#) Tournament seedings in parentheses. All times are in Eastern.
