= 2025–26 Rhode Island Rams women's basketball team =

American college basketball season

2025–26 Rhode Island Rams women's basketball

Atlantic 10 regular season co-champions & tournament champions

NCAA tournament, First Round
- Conference: Atlantic 10 Conference
- Record: 28–5 (16–2 A-10)
- Head coach: Tammi Reiss (7th season)
- Associate head coach: Adeniyi Amadou; Ali Jaques
- Assistant coach: Jen Fay
- Home arena: Ryan Center

2025–26 Atlantic 10 women's basketball standings
| | Conf. | | | | Overall |
| Team | W | | L | PCT | W | | L | PCT |
|---|---|---|---|---|---|---|---|---|
| Rhode Island † | 16 | – | 2 | .889 | 28 | – | 5 | .848 |
| George Mason | 16 | – | 2 | .889 | 23 | – | 10 | .697 |
| Richmond | 15 | – | 3 | .833 | 26 | – | 8 | .765 |
| Davidson | 12 | – | 6 | .667 | 21 | – | 12 | .636 |
| Saint Joseph's | 10 | – | 8 | .556 | 20 | – | 11 | .645 |
| La Salle | 10 | – | 8 | .556 | 19 | – | 14 | .576 |
| Dayton | 9 | – | 9 | .500 | 17 | – | 14 | .548 |
| Loyola Chicago | 9 | – | 9 | .500 | 16 | – | 18 | .471 |
| St. Bonaventure | 7 | – | 11 | .389 | 17 | – | 16 | .515 |
| George Washington | 7 | – | 11 | .389 | 18 | – | 18 | .500 |
| Saint Louis | 5 | – | 13 | .278 | 12 | – | 21 | .364 |
| Duquesne | 4 | – | 14 | .222 | 12 | – | 19 | .387 |
| VCU | 4 | – | 14 | .222 | 8 | – | 23 | .258 |
| Fordham | 2 | – | 16 | .111 | 10 | – | 20 | .333 |
† 2026 A10 tournament winner

The 2025–26 Rhode Island Rams women's basketball team represents the University of Rhode Island during the 2025–26 NCAA Division I women's basketball season. The Rams, led by seventh-year head coach Tammi Reiss, play their home games at the Ryan Center in Kingston, Rhode Island as members of the Atlantic 10 Conference.

== Previous season ==
The Rams finished the 2024–25 season 17–16, 11–7 in A-10 play, to finish in a three-way tie for fifth place. They defeated George Washington, before falling to Saint Joseph's in the quarterfinals of the A-10 tournament.

== Preseason ==
On September 30, 2025, the Atlantic 10 Conference released their preseason poll. Rhode Island was picked to finish fourth in the conference.

=== Preseason rankings ===
Atlantic 10 Preseason Poll
| Place | Team | Votes |
|---|---|---|
| 1 | Richmond | 188 (9) |
| 2 | George Mason | 185 (4) |
| 3 | Davidson | 167 (1) |
| 4 | Rhode Island | 137 |
| 5 | Dayton | 123 |
| 6 | Saint Joseph's | 120 |
| 7 | VCU | 110 |
| 8 | Duquesne | 95 |
| 9 | Saint Louis | 86 |
| 10 | George Washington | 75 |
| 11 | Fordham | 63 |
| 12 | La Salle | 56 |
| 13 | Loyola Chicago | 43 |
| 14 | St. Bonaventure | 22 |
(#) first-place votes

=== Preseason All-A10 Teams ===
Preseason All-A10 Team
| Team | Player | Year | Position |
|---|---|---|---|
| Second | Brooklyn Gray | Senior | Guard |

=== Preseason All-A10 Defensive Team ===
Preseason All-A10 Defensive Team
| Player | Year | Position |
|---|---|---|
| Ines Debroise | Senior | Guard |

== Roster ==
2025–26 Rhode Island Rams women's basketball team
Players
Coaches

| Pos. | # | Name | Height | Year | Previous school | Hometown |
|---|---|---|---|---|---|---|
| G | 0 | Amori Jarrett | 5 ft 8 in (1.73 m) | Fr | Mt. Zion Prep | Baltimore, Maryland |
| G | 3 | Ta'Viyanna Habib | 5 ft 11 in (1.8 m) | GS | George Mason | Tampa, Florida |
| F | 5 | Palmire Mbu | 6 ft 1 in (1.85 m) | Sr | Lycée Hector Berlioz Vincennes | Villeneuve-d'Ascq, France |
| G | 8 | Eva Agba | 6 ft 0 in (1.83 m) | RS Fr | Union Féminine Angers Basket 49 | Marseille, France |
| G | 9 | Valentina Ojeda | 6 ft 0 in (1.83 m) | GS | VCU | Punta Arenas, Chile |
| C | 12 | Albina Syla | 6 ft 5 in (1.96 m) | So | Mäkelänrinteen Lukio | Vantaa, Finland |
| G | 14 | Brooklyn Gray | 5 ft 11 in (1.8 m) | Sr | Saint Louis | Rockford, Illinois |
| G | 15 | Sophia Vital | 5 ft 3 in (1.6 m) | Jr | Tabor Academy | Cambridge, Massachusetts |
| F | 19 | Mary-Kate Tshibuabua | 6 ft 1 in (1.85 m) | RS Fr | École Acadomia | Ternay, France |
| C | 20 | Lilyana Fontcha | 6 ft 4 in (1.93 m) | Fr | INSEP | Strasbourg, France |
| C | 22 | Aimée Michel | 6 ft 3 in (1.91 m) | Fr | Lycee Jean Mermoz | Albi, France |
| G | 23 | Vanessa Harris | 5 ft 10 in (1.78 m) | Fr | Bishop McNamara High School | Glenarden, Maryland |
| G | 30 | Ines Debroise | 5 ft 9 in (1.75 m) | Sr | INSEP | Paris, France |

Head coach

- Tammi Reiss (Virginia)

Assistant coach(es)

- Adeniyi Amadou (Indiana (PA))
- Ali Jaques (NYU)
- Jen Fay (Quinnipiac)

Legend

- (C) Team captain
- (S) Suspended
- (I) Ineligible
- (W) Walk-on
- Injured
- Current redshirt

Roster
Last update: February 12, 2026

== Schedule and results ==
| Date time, TV | Rank^{#} | Opponent^{#} | Result | Record | High points | High rebounds | High assists | Site (attendance) city, state |
Regular season
| November 3, 2025*; 7:00 pm, ESPN+ | | at Manhattan | W 56–38 | 1–0 | 12 – Mbu | 14 – Mbu | 4 – Debroise | Draddy Gymnasium (209); Riverdale, NY |
| November 7, 2025*; 6:00 pm, ESPN+ | | Merrimack | W 84–46 | 2–0 | 14 – Mbu | 8 – Tied | 5 – Debroise | Ryan Center (1,008); Kingston, RI |
| November 10, 2025*; 6:00 pm, ESPN+ | | Emmanuel | W 105–49 | 3–0 | 24 – Mbu | 10 – Gray | 7 – Gray | Ryan Center (927); Kingston, RI |
| November 13, 2025*; 11:00 am, B1G+ | | at Rutgers | L 63–68 | 3–1 | 18 – Gray | 10 – Syla | 3 – Harris | Jersey Mike's Arena (6,829); Piscataway, NJ |
| November 15, 2025*; 5:30 pm, ESPN+ | | Albany | W 64−52 | 4−1 | 12 – Tied | 7 – Tied | 4 – Vital | Ryan Center (1,172); Kingston, RI |
| November 19, 2025*; 6:00 pm, ESPN+ | | Holy Cross | W 73−59 | 5−1 | 19 – Harris | 11 – Syla | 4 – Mbu | Ryan Center (912); Kingston, RI |
| November 23, 2025*; 2:00 pm, ACCNX | | at No. 16 NC State | W 68–63 | 6–1 | 15 – Harris | 6 – Mbu | 3 – Mbu | Reynolds Coliseum (4,705); Raleigh, NC |
| November 26, 2025*; 1:00 pm, ESPN+ | | Princeton | L 59–67 | 6–2 | 19 – Gray | 6 – Mbu | 5 – Gray | Ryan Center (1,029); Kingston, RI |
| December 3, 2025; 7:00 pm, ESPN+ | | at Saint Joseph's | W 59–52 | 7–2 (1–0) | 20 – Mbu | 8 – Gray | 3 – Vital | Hagan Arena (875); Philadelphia, PA |
| December 7, 2025*; 1:00 pm, ESPN+ | | at Maine | W 69–56 | 8–2 | 18 – Tied | 6 – Tied | 4 – Tied | Memorial Gymnasium (1,143); Orono, ME |
| December 10, 2025*; 7:00 pm, ESPN+ | | at Providence | W 57–51 | 9–2 | 16 – Gray | 11 – Gray | 3 – Tied | Alumni Hall (832); Providence, RI |
| December 19, 2025*; 11:00 am, ESPN+ | | Wagner | W 72−36 | 10−2 | 18 – Syla | 9 – Tied | 6 – Gray | Ryan Center (2,155); Kingston, RI |
| December 30, 2025; 6:00 pm, ESPN+ | | Richmond | W 73–61 | 11–2 (2–0) | 19 – Mbu | 9 – Syla | 5 – Vital | Ryan Center (1,146); Kingston, RI |
| January 3, 2026; 8:00 pm, ESPN+ | | at Loyola Chicago | W 70–58 | 12–2 (3–0) | 17 – Debroise | 10 – Syla | 4 – Debroise | Joseph J. Gentile Arena (371); Chicago, IL |
| January 7, 2026; 11:00 am, ESPN+ | | at George Washington | W 79–70 | 13–2 (4–0) | 23 – Gray | 14 – Vital | 5 – Vital | Charles E. Smith Center (970); Washington, D.C. |
| January 10, 2026; 1:00 pm, ESPN+ | | St. Bonaventure | W 66–45 | 14–2 (5–0) | 14 – Vital | 8 – Mbu | 4 – Tied | Ryan Center (1,617); Kingston, RI |
| January 14, 2026; 6:00 pm, ESPN+ | | at VCU | W 46–41 | 15–2 (6–0) | 15 – Gray | 11 – Gray | 6 – Vital | Siegel Center (313); Richmond, VA |
| January 18, 2026; 1:30 pm, USA | | Duquesne | W 70–50 | 16–2 (7–0) | 23 – Syla | 11 – Syla | 6 – Vital | Ryan Center (1,118); Kingston, RI |
| January 21, 2026; 6:00 pm, ESPN+ | | Davidson | W 60–53 | 17–2 (8–0) | 19 – Gray | 9 – Gray | 5 – Debroise | Ryan Center (1,123); Kingston, RI |
| January 25, 2026; 2:00 pm, CBSSN | | at Dayton | W 79–66 | 18–2 (9–0) | 17 – Mbu | 11 – Syla | 6 – Vital | UD Arena; Dayton, OH |
| January 31, 2026; 2:00 pm, ESPN+ | | at Fordham | W 61–47 | 19–2 (10–0) | 13 – Harris | 10 – Syla | 4 – Tied | Rose Hill Gymnasium (506); Bronx, NY |
| February 4, 2026; 6:00 pm, ESPN+ | | Saint Joseph's | W 69–61 | 20–2 (11–0) | 21 – Gray | 11 – Mbu | 3 – Vital | Ryan Center (1,216); Kingston, RI |
| February 8, 2026; 12:00 pm, ESPN+ | | Saint Louis | W 74–43 | 21–2 (12–0) | 15 – Vital | 10 – Syla | 7 – Debroise | Ryan Center (1,576); Kingston, RI |
| February 11, 2026; 6:00 pm, ESPN+ | | VCU | W 85–42 | 22–2 (13–0) | 16 – Harris | 10 – Syla | 7 – Vital | Ryan Center (1,072); Kingston, RI |
| February 14, 2026; 3:00 pm, ESPN+ | | at George Mason | W 79–63 | 23–2 (14–0) | 30 – Gray | 9 – Gray | 3 – Tied | EagleBank Arena (1,412); Fairfax, VA |
| February 18, 2026; 6:30 pm, ESPN+ | | at La Salle | L 59–63 | 23–3 (14–1) | 16 – Syla | 11 – Syla | 5 – Vital | John Glaser Arena (321); Philadelphia, PA |
| February 21, 2026; 1:00 pm, ESPN+ | | Fordham | W 69–39 | 24–3 (15–1) | 16 – Syla | 10 – Vital | 4 – Vital | Ryan Center (2,528); Kingston, RI |
| February 25, 2026; 6:00 pm, ESPN+ | | at Richmond | L 46–72 | 24–4 (15–2) | 9 – Harris | 9 – Michel | 3 – Vital | Robins Center (1,944); Richmond, VA |
| February 28, 2026; 2:30 pm, ESPN+ | | George Washington | W 72–48 | 25–4 (16–2) | 23 – Mbu | 6 – Vital | 7 – Vital | Ryan Center (6,580); Kingston, RI |
A-10 tournament
| March 6, 2026; 11:00 a.m., USA | (1) | vs. (8) Loyola Chicago; Quarterfinals | W 71–64 | 26-4 | 16 – Gray | 6 – Tied | 6 – Vital | Henrico Sports & Events Center; Henrico, VA |
| March 7, 2026; 11:00 a.m., CBSSN | (1) | vs. (4) Davidson; Semifinals | W 55–46 | 27–4 | 22 – Syla | 14 – Syla | 6 – Debroise | Henrico Sports & Events Center; Henrico, VA |
| March 8, 2026; 4:00 p.m., ESPN2 | (1) | vs. (2) George Mason; Finals | W 53–51 | 28–4 | 16 – Gray | 10 – Syla | 3 – Mbu | Henrico Sports & Events Center (2,724); Henrico, VA |
NCAA tournament
| March 20, 2026*; 2:30 p.m., ESPNews | (6 FW3) | vs. (11 FW3) Alabama; First Round | L 55–68 | 28–5 | – | – | – | KFC Yum! Center; Louisville, KY |
*Non-conference game. ^{#}Rankings from AP Poll. (#) Tournament seedings in parentheses. FW3=Fort Worth 3. All times are in Eastern.

== Rankings ==
Ranking movements Legend: ██ Increase in ranking ██ Decrease in ranking — = Not ranked RV = Received votes
| | Week | | | | | | | | | | | | | | | | | | | | |
| Poll | Pre | 1 | 2 | 3 | 4 | 5 | 6 | 7 | 8 | 9 | 10 | 11 | 12 | 13 | 14 | 15 | 16 | 17 | 18 | 19 | Final |
|---|---|---|---|---|---|---|---|---|---|---|---|---|---|---|---|---|---|---|---|---|---|
| AP | — | — | — | — | — | — | — | — | — | — | — | — | — | — | — | RV | RV | RV | RV | RV | |
| Coaches | — | — | — | — | — | — | — | — | — | — | — | — | — | — | — | RV | RV | RV | RV | RV | |
