= 2025–26 Saint Louis Billikens women's basketball team =

American college basketball season

2025–26 Saint Louis Billikens women's basketball
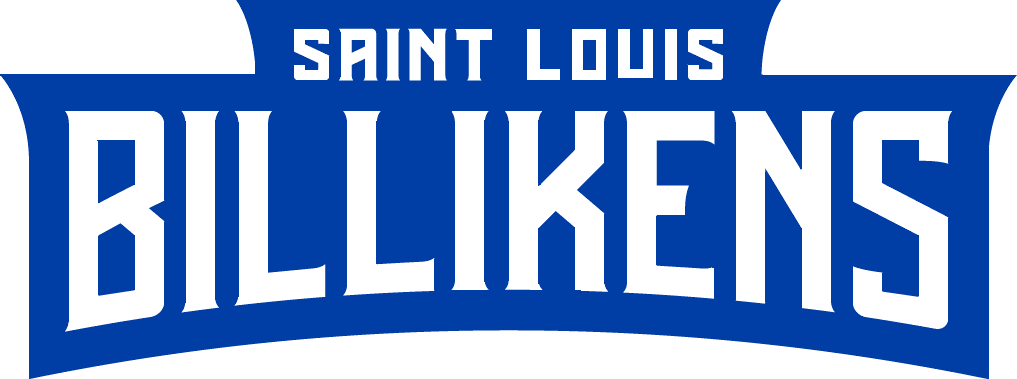
- Conference: Atlantic 10 Conference
- Record: 12–21 (5–13 A-10)
- Head coach: Rebecca Tillett (4th season)
- Associate head coach: Jimmy Colloton
- Assistant coaches: Ka'lia Johnson; Frozena Jerro; Kyla McMakin; Chyna Latimer
- Home arena: Chaifetz Arena

2025–26 Atlantic 10 women's basketball standings
	Conf.				Overall
Team	W		L	PCT	W		L	PCT
Rhode Island †	16	–	2	.889	28	–	5	.848
George Mason	16	–	2	.889	23	–	10	.697
Richmond	15	–	3	.833	26	–	8	.765
Davidson	12	–	6	.667	21	–	12	.636
Saint Joseph's	10	–	8	.556	20	–	11	.645
La Salle	10	–	8	.556	19	–	14	.576
Dayton	9	–	9	.500	17	–	14	.548
Loyola Chicago	9	–	9	.500	16	–	18	.471
St. Bonaventure	7	–	11	.389	17	–	16	.515
George Washington	7	–	11	.389	18	–	18	.500
Saint Louis	5	–	13	.278	12	–	21	.364
Duquesne	4	–	14	.222	12	–	19	.387
VCU	4	–	14	.222	8	–	23	.258
Fordham	2	–	16	.111	10	–	20	.333
† 2026 A10 tournament winner

The 2025–26 Saint Louis Billikens women's basketball team represents Saint Louis University during the 2025–26 NCAA Division I women's basketball season. The Billikens, led by fourth-year head coach Rebecca Tillett, play their home games at Chaifetz Arena in St. Louis, Missouri as members of the Atlantic 10 Conference.

== Previous season ==
The Billikens finished the 2024–25 season 15–19, 7–11 in A-10 play, to finish in tenth place. They defeated St. Bonaventure and UMass, before falling to eventual tournament champions George Mason in the quarterfinals of the A-10 tournament.

== Preseason ==
On September 30, 2025, the Atlantic 10 Conference released their preseason poll. Saint Louis was picked to finish ninth in the conference.

=== Preseason rankings ===
Atlantic 10 Preseason Poll
Place	Team	Votes
1	Richmond	188 (9)
2	George Mason	185 (4)
3	Davidson	167 (1)
4	Rhode Island	137
5	Dayton	123
6	Saint Joseph's	120
7	VCU	110
8	Duquesne	95
9	Saint Louis	86
10	George Washington	75
11	Fordham	63
12	La Salle	56
13	Loyola Chicago	43
14	St. Bonaventure	22
(#) first-place votes

=== Preseason All-A10 Teams ===
Preseason All-A10 Teams
Team	Player	Year	Position
Third	Alexia Nelson	Graduate Student	Guard

=== Preseason All-A10 Defensive Team ===
No players were named to the Preseason All-A10 Defensive Team.

== Roster ==
2025–26 Saint Louis Billikens women's basketball team
Players
Coaches

Pos.	#	Name	Height	Year	Previous school	Hometown
G	0	Jahda Denis	5 ft 7 in (1.7 m)	Fr	Capital Courts Academy	Montreal, Quebec
G	1	Hannah Wallace	6 ft 0 in (1.83 m)	So	Cardinal Ritter Prep	St. Louis, Missouri
G	5	Ellie Paloucek	5 ft 6 in (1.68 m)	Sr	Webster Groves High School	St. Louis, Missouri
G	10	Isabel Tillett	5 ft 10 in (1.78 m)	GS	Longwood	Manassas, Virginia
F	12	Jada Tiggett	6 ft 2 in (1.88 m)	Jr	North Carolina Central	Winchester, California
G	13	Alexia Nelson	5 ft 8 in (1.73 m)	GS	Towson	Brooklyn, New York
C	15	Marilena Triantafylli	6 ft 5 in (1.96 m)	Jr	Syracuse	Athens, Greece
G	22	Zya Nugent	5 ft 9 in (1.75 m)	GS	West Virginia	Denison, Texas
F	25	Jasaiyah Wallace	6 ft 1 in (1.85 m)	Fr	Centralia High School	Centralia, Illinois
G	33	Mia Bergstrom	5 ft 10 in (1.78 m)	So	St. Viator High School	Mount Prospect, Illinois
C	34	Alyssa Koerkenmeier	6 ft 6 in (1.98 m)	Fr	Mater Dei High School	Saint Rose, Illinois
G	35	Zhykera Brown	5 ft 10 in (1.78 m)	Fr	Legacy Early College	Greenville, South Carolina

Head coach

- Rebecca Tillett (William & Mary)

Assistant coach(es)

- Jimmy Colloton (Wittenberg)
- Ka'lia Johnson (Duke)
- Frozena Jerro (Arizona State)
- Kyla McMakin (Saint Louis)
- Chyna Latimer (Ball State)

Legend

- (C) Team captain
- (S) Suspended
- (I) Ineligible
- (W) Walk-on
- Injured
- Current redshirt

Roster
Last update: February 20, 2026

== Schedule and results ==
Date time, TV	Rank^{#}	Opponent^{#}	Result	Record	High points	High rebounds	High assists	Site (attendance) city, state
Exhibition
October 21, 2025*; 7:00 pm		SIU Edwardsville	W 63–56	–	–	–	–	Chaifetz Arena; St. Louis, MO
October 29, 2025*; 6:00 pm		at Bradley	L 68–74 ^{OT}	–	–	–	–	Renaissance Coliseum; Peoria, IL
Regular season
November 3, 2025*; 6:30 pm, ESPN+		at Missouri State	L 66–70	0–1	24 – Nugent	11 – Koerkenmeier	3 – Tied	Great Southern Bank Arena (2,030); Springfield, MO
November 6, 2025*; 4:00 pm, FDSN/ESPN+		Middle Tennessee	L 55–73	0–2	13 – Tied	10 – Koerkenmeier	4 – Tillett	Chaifetz Arena (376); St. Louis, MO
November 9, 2025*; 4:00 pm, ESPN+		Northern Iowa	W 62–58	1–2	17 – Nelson	10 – Nugent	2 – Tied	Chaifetz Arena (567); St. Louis, MO
November 12, 2025*; 7:00 pm, ESPN+		Southern Indiana	L 52–68	1–3	14 – Brown	10 – Nugent	5 – Nugent	Chaifetz Arena (428); St. Louis, MO
November 15, 2025*; 7:00 pm, ESPN+		at Murray State	L 88−96	1−4	23 – Nugent	7 – Koerkenmeier	7 – Nelson	CFSB Center (2,147); Murray, KY
November 21, 2025*; 6:30 pm, ESPN+		at Illinois State	L 75−81	1−5	16 – Brown	10 – Koerkenmeier	3 – Tied	CEFCU Arena (1,721); Normal, IL
November 25, 2025*; 1:15 pm, BallerTV		vs. SMU; Music City Classic	W 70–67	2–5	19 – Nelson	8 – Koerkenmeier	5 – Denis	Trevecca Trojan Fieldhouse (240); Nashville, TN
November 26, 2025*; 11:00 am, BallerTV		vs. Stetson; Music City Classic	L 67–77	2–6	18 – Nelson	6 – Tiggett	3 – Nelson	Trevecca Trojan Fieldhouse (126); Nashville, TN
December 3, 2025; 7:00 pm, ESPN+		St. Bonaventure	W 76–70	3–6 (1–0)	24 – Denis	8 – Koerkenmeier	4 – Denis	Chaifetz Arena (257); St. Louis, MO
December 7, 2025*; 5:00 pm, ESPN+		Evansville	W 72–55	4–6	16 – Brown	9 – Koerkenmeier	4 – Tied	Chaifetz Arena (595); St. Louis, MO
December 14, 2025*; 2:00 pm, ESPN+		Missouri	L 66–82	4–7	18 – Denis	8 – Tied	3 – Denis	Chaifetz Arena (1,506); St. Louis, MO
December 17, 2025*; 4:00 pm, ESPN+		Jacksonville State	W 74−54	5−7	20 – Koerkenmeier	10 – Nugent	5 – Denis	Chaifetz Arena (171); St. Louis, MO
December 20, 2025*; 12:00 pm, ESPN+		at Ohio	W 80–74	6–7	17 – Denis	10 – Koerkenmeier	4 – Nelson	Convocation Center (528); Athens, OH
December 28, 2025*; 5:00 pm, ESPN+		UHSP	W 132–53	7–7	25 – Koerkenmeier	12 – Koerkenmeier	10 – Tied	Chaifetz Arena (479); St. Louis, MO
December 31, 2025; 12:00 pm, ESPN+		at Duquesne	W 72–62	8–7 (2–0)	19 – Nugent	11 – Koerkenmeier	8 – Nelson	UPMC Cooper Fieldhouse (818); Pittsburgh, PA
January 3, 2026; 1:00 pm, ESPN+		Davidson	L 55–71	8–8 (2–1)	18 – Denis	5 – Tied	3 – Tillett	Chaifetz Arena (866); St. Louis, MO
January 7, 2026; 7:00 pm, ESPN+		VCU	L 39–50	8–9 (2–2)	11 – Koerkenmeier	13 – Koerkenmeier	4 – Denis	Chaifetz Arena (646); St. Louis, MO
January 11, 2026; 1:00 pm, USA		at Loyola Chicago	L 64–71	8–10 (2–3)	14 – Koerkenmeier	13 – Nugent	4 – Nelson	Joseph J. Gentile Arena (428); Chicago, IL
January 14, 2026; 10:00 am, ESPN+		at La Salle	W 66–57	9–10 (3–3)	20 – Koerkenmeier	13 – Koerkenmeier	3 – Nugent	John Glaser Arena (850); Philadelphia, PA
January 18, 2026; 2:00 pm, ESPN+		Dayton	W 62–58	10–10 (4–3)	18 – Nugent	11 – Koerkenmeier	4 – Denis	Chaifetz Arena (890); St. Louis, MO
January 21, 2026; 10:00 am, ESPN+		at Fordham	W 67–57 ^{OT}	11–10 (5–3)	19 – Nelson	9 – Nugent	4 – Denis	Rose Hill Gymnasium (1,800); Bronx, NY
January 24, 2026; 6:00 pm, ESPN+		Loyola Chicago	L 59–74	11–11 (5–4)	21 – Koerkenmeier	7 – Tied	5 – Denis	Chaifetz Arena (276); St. Louis, MO
January 28, 2026; 5:00 pm, ESPN+		at George Washington	L 62–64	11–12 (5–5)	19 – Koerkenmeier	9 – Nugent	6 – Nelson	Charles E. Smith Center (406); Washington, D.C.
January 31, 2026; 2:00 pm, ESPN+		at George Mason	L 51–66	11–13 (5–6)	17 – Koerkenmeier	12 – Koerkenmeier	4 – Tillett	EagleBank Arena (1,950); Fairfax, VA
February 4, 2026; 7:00 pm, ESPN+		Richmond	L 44–92	11–14 (5–7)	14 – Bergstrom	14 – Koerkenmeier	4 – Nelson	Chaifetz Arena (450); St. Louis, MO
February 8, 2026; 11:00 am, ESPN+		at Rhode Island	L 43–74	11–15 (5–8)	13 – Nugent	12 – Koerkenmeier	3 – Nelson	Ryan Center (1,576); Kingston, RI
February 11, 2026; 11:00 am, ESPN+		Fordham	L 39–42	11–16 (5–9)	16 – Koerkenmeier	15 – Koerkenmeier	3 – Nelson	Chaifetz Arena (8,000); St. Louis, MO
February 14, 2026; 12:00 pm, ESPN+		at Dayton	L 63–65	11–17 (5–10)	23 – Denis	11 – Koerkenmeier	3 – Tied	UD Arena (2,059); Dayton, OH
February 21, 2026; 2:00 pm, ESPN+		Saint Joseph's	L 54–65	11–18 (5–11)	14 – Koerkenmeier	12 – Koerkenmeier	3 – Denis	Chaifetz Arena (1,374); St. Louis, MO
February 25, 2026; 7:00 pm, ESPN+		Duquesne	L 64–82	11–19 (5–12)	19 – Nugent	8 – Nugent	4 – Koerkenmeier	Chaifetz Arena (444); St. Louis, MO
February 28, 2026; 12:00 pm, ESPN+		at Davidson	L 62–74	11–20 (5–13)	22 – Koerkenmeier	10 – Koerkenmeier	5 – Nelson	John M. Belk Arena (1,249); Davidson, NC
A-10 tournament
March 4, 2026; 2:30 p.m., ESPN+	(11)	vs. (14) Fordham; First round	W 68–60	12–20	21 – Koerkenmeier	14 – Koerkenmeier	4 – Koerkenmeier	Henrico Sports & Events Center (1,181); Henrico, VA
March 5, 2026; 6:30 p.m., ESPN+	(11)	vs. (6) La Salle; Second round	L 51–59	12–21	18 – Koerkenmeier	12 – Koerkenmeier	2 – Tied	Henrico Sports & Events Center (1,273); Henrico, VA
*Non-conference game. ^{#}Rankings from AP Poll. (#) Tournament seedings in parentheses. All times are in Central.
