= 2025–26 George Mason Patriots women's basketball team =

American college basketball season

2025–26 George Mason Patriots women's basketball

Atlantic 10 regular season co-champions

WBIT, First Round
- Conference: Atlantic 10 Conference
- Record: 23–10 (16–2 A-10)
- Head coach: Vanessa Blair-Lewis (6th season)
- Associate head coach: Andre Bolton; Demetria Frank
- Assistant coach: Brittany Ward
- Home arena: EagleBank Arena

2025–26 Atlantic 10 women's basketball standings
	Conf.				Overall
Team	W		L	PCT	W		L	PCT
Rhode Island †	16	–	2	.889	28	–	5	.848
George Mason	16	–	2	.889	23	–	10	.697
Richmond	15	–	3	.833	26	–	8	.765
Davidson	12	–	6	.667	21	–	12	.636
Saint Joseph's	10	–	8	.556	20	–	11	.645
La Salle	10	–	8	.556	19	–	14	.576
Dayton	9	–	9	.500	17	–	14	.548
Loyola Chicago	9	–	9	.500	16	–	18	.471
St. Bonaventure	7	–	11	.389	17	–	16	.515
George Washington	7	–	11	.389	18	–	18	.500
Saint Louis	5	–	13	.278	12	–	21	.364
Duquesne	4	–	14	.222	12	–	19	.387
VCU	4	–	14	.222	8	–	23	.258
Fordham	2	–	16	.111	10	–	20	.333
† 2026 A10 tournament winner

The 2025–26 George Mason Patriots women's basketball team represents George Mason University during the 2025–26 NCAA Division I women's basketball season. The Patriots, led by sixth-year head coach Vanessa Blair-Lewis, play their home games at EagleBank Arena in Fairfax, Virginia, as members of the Atlantic 10 Conference.

== Previous season ==
The Patriots finished the 2024–25 season 27–6, 14–4 in A-10 play, to finish in second place. They defeated Saint Louis, Davidson, and Saint Joseph's to win the A-10 tournament championship, sending the Patriots to their first-ever NCAA tournament appearance. In the tournament, they would receive the No. 11 seed in the Spokane Regional 1, where they would be defeated by No. 6 seed Florida State in the First Round.

== Preseason ==
On September 30, 2025, the Atlantic 10 Conference released their preseason poll. George Mason was picked to finish second in the conference, with four first-place votes.

=== Preseason rankings ===
Atlantic 10 Preseason Poll
Place	Team	Votes
1	Richmond	188 (9)
2	George Mason	185 (4)
3	Davidson	167 (1)
4	Rhode Island	137
5	Dayton	123
6	Saint Joseph's	120
7	VCU	110
8	Duquesne	95
9	Saint Louis	86
10	George Washington	75
11	Fordham	63
12	La Salle	56
13	Loyola Chicago	43
14	St. Bonaventure	22
(#) first-place votes

=== Preseason All-A10 Teams ===
Preseason All-A10 Team
Team	Player	Year	Position
First	Kennedy Harris	Junior	Guard
First	Zahirah Walton	(redshirt) Junior	Forward
Second	Hawa Komara	Graduate Student	Forward

=== Preseason All-A10 Defensive Team ===
Preseason All-A10 Defensive Team
Player	Year	Position
Hawa Komara	Graduate Student	Forward
Zahirah Walton	(redshirt) Junior	Forward

== Roster ==
2025–26 George Mason Patriots women's basketball team
Players
Coaches

Pos.	#	Name	Height	Year	Previous school	Hometown
PG	1	Sanyiah Littlejohn	5 ft 8 in (1.73 m)	Fr	Lansdale Catholic High School	Philadelphia, Pennsylvania
F	2	Zahirah Walton	5 ft 11 in (1.8 m)	RS Jr	Kentlake High School	Seattle, Washington
G	3	Kennedy Harris	5 ft 7 in (1.7 m)	Jr	Hampton High School	Hampton, Virginia
SG	5	Kayla Johnson	5 ft 9 in (1.75 m)	Fr	Elizabeth Seton High School	Upper Marlboro, Maryland
G	8	Kailani Merrell	6 ft 0 in (1.83 m)	Fr	Spruce Creek High School	Daytona Beach, Florida
F	10	Trinity Massenburg	6 ft 0 in (1.83 m)	RS So	Baltimore Polytechnic Institute	Baltimore, Maryland
PG	11	Mary Amoateng	5 ft 8 in (1.73 m)	So	Bishop McNamara High School	Baltimore, Maryland
G	12	Matilde Motta	5 ft 11 in (1.8 m)	Fr	A.S.D. Basket Costa Masnaga	Saronno, Italy
G	13	Jada Brown	5 ft 6 in (1.68 m)	Sr	New Hope Academy	Falls Church, Virginia
F	14	MJ Johnson	6 ft 3 in (1.91 m)	GS	Ball State	Chicago, Illinois
F	15	Louis Volker	6 ft 1 in (1.85 m)	Jr	Missouri State	Purcellville, Virginia
F	22	Hawa Komara	6 ft 2 in (1.88 m)	GS	Rhode Island	Toulouse, France
SF	23	Leah Keyes	5 ft 10 in (1.78 m)	Fr	Virginia Academy	Stafford, Virginia
C	30	Sara Blair	6 ft 5 in (1.96 m)	Fr	St. Thomas Aquinas High School	Fort Lauderdale, Florida
G	32	Page Greenburg	5 ft 9 in (1.75 m)	RS Jr	Brown	Washington, D.C.

Head coach

- Vanessa Blair-Lewis (Mount St. Mary's)

Assistant coach(es)

- Andre Bolton (Christopher Newport)
- Demetria Frank (Bethune–Cookman)
- Brittany Ward (Dayton)

Legend

- (C) Team captain
- (S) Suspended
- (I) Ineligible
- (W) Walk-on
- Injured
- Current redshirt

Roster
Last update: February 14, 2026

== Schedule and results ==
Date time, TV	Rank^{#}	Opponent^{#}	Result	Record	High points	High rebounds	High assists	Site (attendance) city, state
Regular season
November 3, 2025*; 7:00 pm, ESPN+		at Temple	L 85–94 ^{OT}	0–1	31 – Walton	12 – Walton	4 – MJ Johnson	Liacouras Center (1,406); Philadelphia, PA
November 6, 2025*; 7:00 pm, ESPN+		at James Madison	W 72–57	1–1	22 – Walton	7 – Walton	4 – Amoateng	Atlantic Union Bank Center (2,365); Harrisonburg, VA
November 10, 2025*; 7:00 pm, ESPN+		Florida A&M	W 88–40	2–1	15 – Harris	13 – Blair	5 – Tied	EagleBank Arena (947); Fairfax, VA
November 14, 2025*; 7:00 pm, ESPN+		Georgetown	W 61–54 ^{OT}	3–1	21 – Harris	12 – MJ Johnson	3 – Tied	EagleBank Arena (1,483); Fairfax, VA
November 19, 2025*; 7:00 pm, ESPN+		Florida Gulf Coast	W 58−41	4−1	14 – Walton	10 – Walton	2 – Tied	EagleBank Arena (709); Fairfax, VA
November 23, 2025*; 2:30 pm, BTN		at No. 9 Maryland	L 62−84	4−2	27 – Walton	6 – MJ Johnson	5 – Amoateng	Xfinity Center (7,402); College Park, MD
November 25, 2025*; 7:00 pm, ESPN+		Rider	W 72–54	5–2	14 – Brown	9 – Volker	4 – Amoateng	EagleBank Arena (841); Fairfax, VA
November 28, 2025*; 1:30 pm, Baller TV		vs. Murray State; Daytona Beach Classic	L 83–88	5–3	42 – Walton	7 – Volker	4 – Tied	Ocean Center (175); Daytona Beach, FL
November 29, 2025*; 4:00 pm, Baller TV		vs. No. 13 Ole Miss; Daytona Beach Classic	L 67–81	5–4	20 – Walton	10 – MJ Johnson	4 – Walton	Ocean Center (217); Daytona Beach, FL
December 3, 2025; 7:00 pm, ESPN+		Fordham	W 73–55	6–4 (1–0)	13 – Walton	8 – Komara	2 – Tied	EagleBank Arena (658); Fairfax, VA
December 7, 2025*; 3:00 pm, ESPN+		Liberty	L 73–74	6–5	25 – MJ Johnson	7 – Tied	4 – MJ Johnson	EagleBank Arena (776); Fairfax, VA
December 20, 2025*; 1:00 pm, ESPN+		No. 25 Princeton	L 69−71 ^{OT}	6−6	18 – Walton	10 – Komara	2 – Tied	EagleBank Arena (1,186); Fairfax, VA
December 31, 2025; 12:00 pm, ESPN+		Dayton	W 74–59	7–6 (2–0)	25 – Walton	8 – Tied	4 – Walton	EagleBank Arena (4,123); Fairfax, VA
January 4, 2026; 12:00 pm, CBSSN		at VCU; Rivalry	W 68–58	8–6 (3–0)	21 – Harris	8 – MJ Johnson	3 – Tied	Siegel Center (504); Richmond, VA
January 7, 2026; 7:00 pm, ESPN+		La Salle	W 62–47	9–6 (4–0)	18 – Harris	8 – Komara	5 – Harris	EagleBank Arena (784); Fairfax, VA
January 11, 2026; 12:00 pm, CBSSN		at George Washington; Revolutionary Rivalry	W 59–46	10–6 (5–0)	21 – Walton	7 – Volker	4 – Brown	Charles E. Smith Center (612); Washington, D.C.
January 14, 2026; 7:00 pm, ESPN+		Loyola Chicago	W 59–54	11–6 (6–0)	25 – Walton	9 – Volker	5 – K. Johnson	EagleBank Arena (727); Fairfax, VA
January 18, 2026; 2:00 pm, CBSSN		at Saint Joseph's	W 66–59	12–6 (7–0)	22 – Harris	9 – Komara	5 – Amoateng	Hagan Arena (1,057); Philadelphia, PA
January 21, 2026; 6:00 pm, ESPN+		at St. Bonaventure	W 57–48	13–6 (8–0)	14 – Tied	11 – Komara	3 – Brown	Reilly Center (404); St. Bonaventure, NY
January 25, 2026; 11:00 am, ESPNU		Richmond	Postponed due to inclement weather					EagleBank Arena; Fairfax, VA
January 28, 2026; 7:00 pm, ESPN+		at Davidson	W 62–51	14–6 (9–0)	14 – Walton	8 – Komara	5 – Harris	John M. Belk Arena (786); Davidson, NC
January 31, 2026; 3:00 pm, ESPN+		Saint Louis	W 66–51	15–6 (10–0)	15 – Walton	9 – Walton	6 – Walton	EagleBank Arena (1,950); Fairfax, VA
February 7, 2026; 6:00 pm, ESPN+		at Richmond	L 57–71	15–7 (10–1)	17 – Amoateng	13 – Komara	5 – Amoateng	Robins Center (2,148); Richmond, VA
February 11, 2026; 11:00 am, ESPN+		at Dayton	W 72–61	16–7 (11–1)	20 – Brown	12 – Komara	3 – Walton	UD Arena (12,598); Dayton, OH
February 14, 2026; 3:00 pm, ESPN+		Rhode Island	L 63–79	16–8 (11–2)	13 – Komara	16 – Komara	3 – MJ Johnson	EagleBank Arena (1,412); Fairfax, VA
February 16, 2026; 4:00 pm, ESPN+		Richmond; Rescheduled from January 25	W 46–37	17–8 (12–2)	15 – Harris	12 – Komara	3 – Tied	EagleBank Arena (1,386); Fairfax, VA
February 18, 2026; 7:00 pm, ESPN+		at Loyola Chicago	W 67–55	18–8 (13–2)	22 – Walton	6 – Tied	3 – Walton	Joseph J. Gentile Arena (412); Chicago, IL
February 21, 2026; 3:00 pm, ESPN+		George Washington; Revolutionary Rivalry	W 67–52	19–8 (14–2)	22 – Walton	8 – Walton	2 – Tied	EagleBank Arena (2,570); Fairfax, VA
February 25, 2026; 7:00 pm, ESPN+		Saint Joseph's	W 85–59	20–8 (15–2)	29 – Walton	8 – Walton	4 – Walton	EagleBank Arena (846); Fairfax, VA
February 28, 2026; 2:00 pm, ESPN+		at Duquesne	W 65–48	21–8 (16–2)	16 – Walton	13 – Walton	5 – Brown	UPMC Cooper Fieldhouse (797); Pittsburgh, PA
A-10 tournament
March 6, 2026; 5:00 p.m., USA	(2)	vs. (7) Dayton; Quarterfinals	W 87–85 ^{OT}	22–8	24 – Harris	8 – Volker	5 – Amoateng	Henrico Sports & Events Center; Henrico, VA
March 7, 2026; 1:30 p.m., CBSSN	(2)	vs. (3) Richmond; Semifinals	W 60–45	23–8	24 – Walton	9 – Walton	3 – Harris	Henrico Sports & Events Center (2,673); Henrico, VA
March 8, 2026; 4:00 p.m., ESPN2	(2)	vs. (1) Rhode Island; Championship	L 51–53	23–9	15 – Harris	8 – Komara	3 – Brown	Henrico Sports & Events Center (2,724); Henrico, VA
WBIT
March 19, 2026; 7:00 p.m., ESPN+	(3)	Quinnipiac; First Round	L 64–71	23–10	24 – Walton	8 – Komara	2 – Tied	EagleBank Arena (511); Fairfax, VA
*Non-conference game. ^{#}Rankings from AP Poll. (#) Tournament seedings in parentheses. All times are in Eastern.
