= 2024–25 George Washington Revolutionaries women's basketball team =

American college basketball season

2024–25 George Washington Revolutionaries women's basketball
- Conference: Atlantic 10 Conference
- Record: 13–18 (5–13 A–10)
- Head coach: Caroline McCombs (resigned February 24th, 11–16 record); Doug Novak (interim, 2–2 record)
- Assistant coaches: Adam Call; Jasmyn Walker; Doug Novak; Amy Pryor
- Home arena: Charles E. Smith Center

2024–25 Atlantic 10 women's basketball standings
	Conf.				Overall
Team	W		L	PCT	W		L	PCT
Richmond	17	–	1	.944	28	–	7	.800
George Mason †	14	–	4	.778	27	–	6	.818
Davidson	13	–	5	.722	19	–	14	.576
Saint Joseph's	12	–	6	.667	24	–	10	.706
Rhode Island	11	–	7	.611	17	–	16	.515
Dayton	11	–	7	.611	18	–	13	.581
UMass	11	–	7	.611	17	–	15	.531
Fordham	9	–	9	.500	15	–	15	.500
Duquesne	9	–	9	.500	21	–	13	.618
Saint Louis	7	–	11	.389	15	–	19	.441
VCU	6	–	12	.333	12	–	19	.387
George Washington	5	–	13	.278	13	–	18	.419
Loyola Chicago	5	–	13	.278	13	–	17	.433
La Salle	3	–	15	.167	10	–	23	.303
St. Bonaventure	2	–	16	.111	6	–	24	.200
† 2025 A10 tournament winner

The 2024–25 George Washington Revolutionaries women's basketball team represented George Washington University during the 2024–25 NCAA Division I women's basketball season. The Revolutionaries were led by 4th year head coach Caroline McCombs prior to her resignation on February 24th. They played their home games at Charles E. Smith Center in Washington, D.C. as members of the Atlantic 10 Conference.

== Previous season ==
The Revolutionaries finished the 2023–24 season 13–18, 6–12 in A–10 play to finish in 11th place. They were defeated by Saint Louis in the second round of the A–10 tournament.

== Roster ==
2024–25 George Washington Revolutionaries women's basketball team
Players
Coaches

Pos.	#	Name	Height	Year	Previous school	Hometown
G	1	Gabby Reynolds	5 ft 9 in (1.75 m)	Fr	West Ottawa High School	Holland, Michigan
F	3	Miriam Diala	6 ft 1 in (1.85 m)	Fr	USC Heidelberg	Heidelberg, Germany
F	4	Sara Lewis	6 ft 1 in (1.85 m)	So	Woodward Academy	Atlanta, Georgia
G	7	Filipa Calisto	6 ft 0 in (1.83 m)	Jr	New Mexico Junior College	Beira, Mozambique
F	10	Kyraha Parnell	6 ft 3 in (1.91 m)	Fr	Virginia Episcopal School	Galax, Virginia
G	11	Morgan Matthews	6 ft 0 in (1.83 m)	Fr	The Pennington School	Lawrenceville, New Jersey
G	12	Kamari Sims	6 ft 1 in (1.85 m)	So	Riverdale Baptist School	Severn, Maryland
F	13	Caia Loving	6 ft 2 in (1.88 m)	Jr	Riverdale Baptist School	Upper Marlboro, Maryland
F	20	Maxine Engel	6 ft 0 in (1.83 m)	Sr	Hutchison School	Memphis, Tennessee
G	22	Natalia Sierra-Vargas	5 ft 8 in (1.73 m)	Jr	The Bishop's School	San Diego, California
G	23	Makayla Andrews	5 ft 10 in (1.78 m)	GS	Lafayette	Neptune, New Jersey
F	24	Maeva Fotsa	6 ft 2 in (1.88 m)	Jr	South Georgia Tech	Quebec City, Canada
F/C	27	Mariona Planes Fortuny	6 ft 1 in (1.85 m)	GS	Bryant	Bellpuig, Spain
F	40	Paige Mott	6 ft 1 in (1.85 m)	GS	Northwestern	Philadelphia, Pennsylvania

Head coach

- Caroline McCombs (Youngstown State)

Assistant coach(es)

- Adam Call (Oklahoma)
- Jasmyn Walker (Western Michigan)
- Doug Novak (Tennessee)
- Amy Pryor (Oklahoma Baptist)

Legend

- (C) Team captain
- (S) Suspended
- (I) Ineligible
- (W) Walk-on
- Injured
- Current redshirt

Roster
Last update: December 31, 2024

== Schedule and results ==
Date time, TV	Rank^{#}	Opponent^{#}	Result	Record	High points	High rebounds	High assists	Site (attendance) city, state
Regular season
November 4, 2024*; 5:00 pm, ESPN+		Delaware	W 78–66	1–0	24 – Andrews	8 – Lewis	5 – Sims	Charles E. Smith Center (294); Washington, D.C.
November 8, 2024*; 6:00 pm		at Howard	L 66–69	2–0	22 – Reynolds	14 – Planes Fortuny	2 – Tied	Burr Gymnasium (1,400); Washington, D.C.
November 11, 2024*; 6:00 pm, ESPN+		Virginia Lynchburg	W 89–38	2–1	18 – Diala	10 – Diala	4 – Andrews	Charles E. Smith Center (461); Washington, D.C.
November 16, 2024*; 12:00 pm, ESPN+		at Ohio	L 40–52	2–2	11 – Calisto	9 – Lewis	6 – Reynolds	Convocation Center (564); Athens, OH
November 20, 2024*; 6:00 pm, Monumental/ESPN+		Towson	W 69–57	3–2	16 – Andrews	10 – Lewis	4 – Sims	Charles E. Smith Center (506); Washington, D.C.
November 23, 2024*; 12:00 pm, ESPN+		Georgia Southern	W 56–46	4–2	12 – Lewis	8 – Lewis	4 – Planes Fortuny	Charles E. Smith Center (358); Washington, D.C.
November 27, 2024*; 12:00 pm, ESPN+		Morgan State	W 52–47	5–2	16 – Andrews	6 – Tied	3 – Calisto	Charles E. Smith Center (316); Washington, D.C.
December 3, 2024; 6:00 pm, ESPN+		George Mason; Revolutionary Rivalry	L 55–87	5–3 (0–1)	23 – Andrews	6 – Andrews	1 – Tied	Charles E. Smith Center (448); Washington, D.C.
December 10, 2024*; 6:00 pm, ESPN+		Coppin State	L 61–64 ^{OT}	5–4	13 – Reynolds	10 – Lewis	3 – Sims	Charles E. Smith Center (436); Washington, D.C.
December 16, 2024*; 7:00 pm, ESPN+		at American	W 62–47	6–4	16 – Andrews	9 – Sierra-Vargas	4 – Sierra-Vargas	Bender Arena (311); Washington, D.C.
December 20, 2024*; 2:00 pm, ESPN+		vs. Miami (OH); FIU Christmas Classic	L 49–74	6–5	10 – Tied	9 – Lewis	3 – Andrews	Ocean Bank Convocation Center (485); Miami, FL
December 21, 2024*; 2:00 pm, ESPN+		vs. Hampton; FIU Christmas Classic	W 72–69	7–5	18 – Planes Fortuny	14 – Mott	4 – Reynolds	Ocean Bank Convocation Center (486); Miami, FL
December 29, 2024; 2:00 pm, ESPN+		at La Salle	W 65–54	8–5 (1–1)	18 – Mott	10 – Mott	5 – Reynolds	John Glaser Arena (187); Philadelphia, PA
January 5, 2025; 12:00 pm, ESPN+		Loyola Chicago	L 63–67	8–6 (1–2)	18 – Andrews	9 – Lewis	2 – Tied	Charles E. Smith Center (409); Washington, D.C.
January 8, 2025; 11:00 am, ESPN+		at Fordham	L 53–61	8–7 (1–3)	14 – Reynolds	9 – Mott	2 – Tied	Rose Hill Gymnasium (2,850); Bronx, NY
January 11, 2025; 12:00 pm, ESPN+		Duquesne	L 55–97	8–8 (1–4)	18 – Engel	8 – Loving	6 – Sierra-Vargas	Charles E. Smith Center (505); Washington, D.C.
January 15, 2025; 8:00 pm, ESPN+		at Saint Louis	L 63–64	8–9 (1–5)	15 – Calisto	11 – Mott	5 – Sierra-Vargas	Chaifetz Arena (532); St. Louis, MO
January 22, 2025; 6:00 pm, Monumental		VCU	L 56–65	8–10 (1–6)	13 – Tied	5 – Tied	3 – Mott	Charles E. Smith Center (463); Washington, D.C.
January 25, 2025; 3:00 pm, ESPN+		at George Mason; Revolutionary Rivalry	L 50–91	8–11 (1–7)	16 – Lewis	7 – Tied	3 – Reynolds	EagleBank Arena (1,814); Fairfax, VA
January 29, 2025; 6:00 pm, NESN/ESPN+		at UMass	L 54–71	8–12 (1–8)	14 – Andrews	6 – Andrews	4 – Andrews	Mullins Center (1,195); Amherst, MA
February 1, 2025; 2:00 pm, Monumental/ESPN+		Saint Joseph's	L 42–57	8–13 (1–9)	16 – Andrews	8 – Mott	2 – Mott	Charles E. Smith Center (914); Washington, D.C.
February 4, 2025; 6:00 pm, ESPN+		Fordham	W 69–59	9–13 (2–9)	18 – Reynolds	8 – Reynolds	5 – Diala	Charles E. Smith Center (645); Washington, D.C.
February 8, 2025; 1:00 pm, ESPN+		at St. Bonaventure	W 58–49	10–13 (3–9)	15 – Andrews	9 – Andrews	4 – Reynolds	Reilly Center (553); St. Bonaventure, NY
February 12, 2025; 7:00 pm, ESPN+		at Loyola Chicago	W 53–41	11–13 (4–9)	16 – Mott	12 – Mott	4 – Reynolds	Joseph J. Gentile Arena (165); Chicago, IL
February 15, 2025; 2:00 pm, Monumental/ESPN+		Dayton	L 51–66	11–14 (4–10)	22 – Reynolds	7 – Reynolds	3 – Mott	Charles E. Smith Center (607); Washington, D.C.
February 19, 2025; 6:00 pm, ESPN+		at Richmond	L 57–67	11–15 (4–11)	15 – Sims	5 – Tied	3 – Diala	Robins Center (849); Richmond, VA
February 23, 2025; 12:00 pm, ESPN+		Davidson	L 54–73	11–16 (4–12)	11 – Lewis	10 – Mott	3 – Tied	Charles E. Smith Center (602); Washington, D.C.
February 26, 2025; 12:00 pm, ESPN+		UMass	L 55–61	11–17 (4–13)	11 – Mott	12 – Lewis	5 – Andrews	Charles E. Smith Center (1,509); Washington, D.C.
March 1, 2025; 1:00 pm, ESPN+		at Rhode Island	W 54–46	12–17 (5–13)	15 – Andrews	7 – Tied	2 – Mott	Ryan Center (1,444); Kingston, RI
A-10 tournament
March 5, 2025; 12:00 pm, ESPN+	(12)	vs. (13) Loyola Chicago; First round	W 65–44	13–17	14 – Andrews	9 – Andrews	5 – Andrews	Henrico Sports & Events Center; Henrico, VA
March 6, 2025; 1:30 pm, ESPN+	(12)	vs. (5) Rhode Island; Second round	L 41–52	13–18	14 – Andrews	10 – Mott	2 – Calisto	Henrico Sports & Events Center (1,972); Henrico, VA
*Non-conference game. ^{#}Rankings from AP Poll. (#) Tournament seedings in parentheses. All times are in Eastern.
