= 2024–25 George Mason Patriots women's basketball team =

American college basketball season

2024–25 George Mason Patriots women's basketball

Atlantic 10 tournament champions

NCAA tournament, First Round
- Conference: Atlantic 10 Conference
- Record: 27–6 (14–4 A-10)
- Head coach: Vanessa Blair-Lewis (5th season)
- Associate head coach: Niki Washington; Andre Bolton
- Assistant coaches: Demetria Frank; Brittany Ward
- Home arena: EagleBank Arena

2024–25 Atlantic 10 women's basketball standings
	Conf.				Overall
Team	W		L	PCT	W		L	PCT
Richmond	17	–	1	.944	28	–	7	.800
George Mason †	14	–	4	.778	27	–	6	.818
Davidson	13	–	5	.722	19	–	14	.576
Saint Joseph's	12	–	6	.667	24	–	10	.706
Rhode Island	11	–	7	.611	17	–	16	.515
Dayton	11	–	7	.611	18	–	13	.581
UMass	11	–	7	.611	17	–	15	.531
Fordham	9	–	9	.500	15	–	15	.500
Duquesne	9	–	9	.500	21	–	13	.618
Saint Louis	7	–	11	.389	15	–	19	.441
VCU	6	–	12	.333	12	–	19	.387
George Washington	5	–	13	.278	13	–	18	.419
Loyola Chicago	5	–	13	.278	13	–	17	.433
La Salle	3	–	15	.167	10	–	23	.303
St. Bonaventure	2	–	16	.111	6	–	24	.200
† 2025 A10 tournament winner

The 2024–25 George Mason Patriots women's basketball team represented George Mason University during the 2024–25 NCAA Division I women's basketball season. The Patriots, led by fifth-year head coach Vanessa Blair-Lewis, played their home games at EagleBank Arena in Fairfax, Virginia, as members of the Atlantic 10 Conference.

== Previous season ==
The Patriots finished the 2023–24 season 23–8, 14–4 in A-10 play to finish in fourth place. They were defeated by Duquesne in the quarterfinals of the A-10 tournament. They received an at-large bid to the WBIT, where they would be defeated in overtime by Penn State in the first round.

== Roster ==
2024–25 George Mason Patriots women's basketball team
Players
Coaches

Pos.	#	Name	Height	Year	Previous school	Hometown
F	2	Zahirah Walton	5 ft 11 in (1.8 m)	Jr	Kentlake High School	Seattle, Washington
G	3	Kennedy Harris	5 ft 7 in (1.7 m)	So	Hampton High School	Hampton, Virginia
C	4	Sarah Oduro	6 ft 3 in (1.91 m)	Fr	Virginia Academy	Gainesville, Virginia
F	10	Trinity Massenburg	6 ft 0 in (1.83 m)	So	Baltimore Polytechnic Institute	Baltimore, Maryland
F	11	Nekhu Mitchell	6 ft 0 in (1.83 m)	Jr	McDonogh School	Baltimore, Maryland
G	13	Jada Brown	5 ft 6 in (1.68 m)	Jr	New Hope Academy	Falls Church, Virginia
G	14	Paula Suárez	6 ft 0 in (1.83 m)	Sr	IES Mateo Hernandez	Pamplona, Spain
F	15	Louis Volker	6 ft 1 in (1.85 m)	So	Missouri State	Purcellville, Virginia
F	21	Faith Okorie	6 ft 0 in (1.83 m)	So	Example Academy	Chicago, Illinois
G	22	Ta'Viyanna Habib	5 ft 11 in (1.8 m)	GS	Indian River State College	Tampa, Florida
G	23	Khamya McNeal	5 ft 7 in (1.7 m)	GS	Stetson	Milwaukee, Wisconsin
C	24	LeAire Nicks	6 ft 2 in (1.88 m)	Fr	Wylie East High School	Des Moines, Iowa
G	32	Page Greenburg	5 ft 9 in (1.75 m)	Jr	Brown	Washington, D.C.
F	42	Nalani Kaysia	6 ft 2 in (1.88 m)	GS	Charlotte	Washington, D.C.

Head coach

- Vanessa Blair-Lewis (Mount St. Mary's)

Assistant coach(es)

- Niki Washington (Southern Illinois)
- Andre Bolton (Christopher Newport)
- Demetria Frank (Bethune–Cookman)
- Brittany Ward (Dayton)

Legend

- (C) Team captain
- (S) Suspended
- (I) Ineligible
- (W) Walk-on
- Injured
- Current redshirt

Roster
Last update: December 28, 2024

== Schedule and results ==
Date time, TV	Rank^{#}	Opponent^{#}	Result	Record	High points	High rebounds	High assists	Site (attendance) city, state
Regular season
November 4, 2024*; 2:00 pm, ESPN+		Johnson C. Smith	W 106–51	1–0	19 – Habib	5 – Kaysia	5 – Harris	EagleBank Arena (676); Fairfax, VA
November 9, 2024*; 3:00 pm, ESPN+		Towson	W 76–55	2–0	17 – Harris	10 – Kaysia	7 – Harris	EagleBank Arena (1,107); Fairfax, VA
November 12, 2024*; 7:00 pm, ESPN+		Monmouth	W 89–66	3–0	20 – Harris	5 – Tied	4 – Harris	EagleBank Arena (732); Fairfax, VA
November 17, 2024*; 6:00 pm, ESPN+		at Marshall	W 69–56	4–0	21 – Walton	16 – Kaysia	6 – Suárez	Cam Henderson Center (1,037); Huntington, WV
November 20, 2024*; 7:00 pm, ACCN		at Wake Forest	W 50–41	5–0	15 – Harris	10 – Kaysia	3 – Suárez	LJVM Coliseum (744); Winston-Salem, NC
November 26, 2024*; 7:00 pm, ESPN+		Mount St. Mary's	W 87–51	6–0	14 – Brown	8 – Tied	5 – Tied	EagleBank Arena (882); Fairfax, VA
November 30, 2024*; 3:30 pm, ESPN+		vs. No. 10 Maryland; Navy Classic	L 56–66	6–1	26 – Harris	11 – Walton	3 – Tied	Alumni Hall (1,305); Annapolis, MD
December 1, 2024*; 1:00 pm, ESPN+		at Navy; Navy Classic	W 85–63	7–1	25 – Harris	14 – Kaysia	7 – Suárez	Alumni Hall; Annapolis, MD
December 3, 2024; 6:00 pm, ESPN+		at George Washington; Revolutionary Rivalry	W 87–55	8–1 (1–0)	20 – Habib	8 – Walton	8 – Suárez	Charles E. Smith Center (448); Washington, D.C.
December 9, 2024*; 7:00 pm, FloHoops		at Georgetown	W 63–55	9–1	23 – Walton	10 – Tied	5 – Harris	McDonough Arena (385); Washington, D.C.
December 14, 2024*; 3:00 pm, ESPN+		Maryland Eastern Shore	W 61–40	10–1	14 – Volker	10 – Kaysia	2 – Tied	EagleBank Arena (1,057); Fairfax, VA
December 20, 2024*; 2:00 pm, ESPN+		UMBC	W 75–53	11–1	15 – Suárez	16 – Kaysia	5 – Suárez	EagleBank Arena (651); Fairfax, VA
January 2, 2025; 12:00 pm, ESPN+		Saint Joseph's	L 55–61	11–2 (1–1)	18 – Suárez	10 – Habib	1 – Tied	EagleBank Arena (3,354); Fairfax, VA
January 5, 2025; 3:00 pm, ESPN+		St. Bonaventure	W 83–63	12–2 (2–1)	22 – Suárez	14 – Kaysia	5 – Suárez	EagleBank Arena (1,064); Fairfax, VA
January 8, 2025; 6:00 pm, ESPN+		at Richmond	L 86–88	12–3 (2–2)	26 – Harris	5 – Habib	8 – Suárez	Robins Center (114); Richmond, VA
January 12, 2025; 12:00 pm, CBSSN		at Rhode Island	W 71–65	13–3 (3–2)	22 – Walton	7 – Walton	4 – Suárez	Ryan Center (1,723); Kingston, RI
January 15, 2025; 7:00 pm, ESPN+		Loyola Chicago	W 69–39	14–3 (4–2)	15 – Walton	12 – Kaysia	5 – Suárez	EagleBank Arena (853); Fairfax, VA
January 18, 2025; 2:00 pm, ESPN+		at La Salle	W 57–40	15–3 (5–2)	17 – Walton	6 – Habib	6 – Suárez	John Glaser Arena (382); Philadelphia, PA
January 22, 2025; 7:00 pm, ESPN+		Davidson	W 81–73	16–3 (6–2)	29 – Harris	5 – Tied	5 – Harris	EagleBank Arena (901); Fairfax, VA
January 25, 2025; 3:00 pm, MASN		George Washington; Revolutionary Rivalry	W 91–50	17–3 (7–2)	23 – Harris	9 – Kaysia	7 – Harris	EagleBank Arena (1,814); Fairfax, VA
January 29, 2025; 12:00 pm, ESPN+		at Saint Louis	W 80–53	18–3 (8–2)	30 – Walton	7 – Kaysia	6 – Walton	Chaifetz Arena (3,378); St. Louis, MO
February 1, 2025; 1:00 pm, ESPN+		at Dayton	W 86–53	19–3 (9–2)	23 – Suárez	9 – Kaysia	6 – Walton	UD Arena (2,040); Dayton, OH
February 5, 2025; 7:00 pm, ESPN+		VCU; Rivalry	W 66–48	20–3 (10–2)	17 – Suárez	14 – Kaysia	7 – Suárez	EagleBank Arena (1,216); Fairfax, VA
February 8, 2025; 2:00 pm, ESPN+		at Fordham	W 70–43	21–3 (11–2)	18 – Walton	6 – Walton	6 – Suárez	Rose Hill Gymnasium (610); Bronx, NY
February 12, 2025; 7:00 pm, ESPN+		Rhode Island	W 56–44	22–3 (12–2)	17 – Suárez	10 – Kaysia	5 – Suárez	EagleBank Arena (1,027); Fairfax, VA
February 16, 2025; 3:00 pm, MASN		UMass	W 76–66	23–3 (13–2)	20 – Mitchell	13 – Kaysia	7 – Suárez	EagleBank Arena (2,679); Fairfax, VA
February 20, 2025; 8:00 pm, Peacock		at Davidson	L 50–66	23–4 (13–3)	4 – Walton	14 – Kaysia	4 – Suárez	John M. Belk Arena (698); Davidson, NC
February 23, 2025; 4:00 pm, ESPNU		at Saint Joseph's	L 69–83	23–5 (13–4)	28 – Walton	11 – Kaysia	5 – Walton	Hagan Arena (1,674); Philadelphia, PA
March 1, 2025; 3:00 pm, ESPN+		Duquesne	W 86–63	24–5 (14–4)	16 – Walton	21 – Kaysia	4 – Walton	EagleBank Arena (2,456); Fairfax, VA
A-10 tournament
March 7, 2025; 5:00 pm, Peacock	(2)	vs. (10) Saint Louis; Quarterfinals	W 87–57	25–5	18 – Harris	10 – Kaysia	4 – Walton	Henrico Sports & Events Center; Henrico, VA
March 8, 2025; 1:30 pm, CBSSN	(2)	vs. (3) Davidson; Semifinals	W 63–50	26–5	16 – Walton	9 – Kaysia	4 – Suárez	Henrico Sports & Events Center (2,611); Henrico, VA
March 9, 2025; 4:00 pm, ESPN2	(2)	vs. (4) Saint Joseph's; Championship Game	W 73–58	27–5	23 – Suárez	8 – Tied	6 – Suárez	Henrico Sports & Events Center (2,718); Henrico, VA
NCAA tournament
March 22, 2025*; 7:45 pm, ESPN2	(11 S1)	vs. (6 S1) No. 22 Florida State; First Round	L 59–94	27–6	25 – Suarez	7 – Kaysia	5 – Harris	Pete Maravich Assembly Center (9,288); Baton Rouge, LA
*Non-conference game. ^{#}Rankings from AP Poll. (#) Tournament seedings in parentheses. All times are in Eastern.
