= 2024–25 Saint Joseph's Hawks women's basketball team =

American college basketball season

2024–25 Saint Joseph's Hawks women's basketball
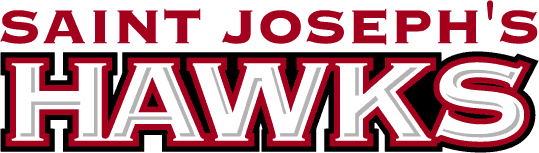

WBIT, Second Round
- Conference: Atlantic 10 Conference
- Record: 24–10 (12–6 A-10)
- Head coach: Cindy Griffin (24th season)
- Associate head coach: Melissa Dunne
- Assistant coaches: Katie Kuester; Ashley Prim
- Home arena: Hagan Arena

2024–25 Atlantic 10 women's basketball standings
| | Conf. | | | | Overall |
| Team | W | | L | PCT | W | | L | PCT |
|---|---|---|---|---|---|---|---|---|
| Richmond | 17 | – | 1 | .944 | 28 | – | 7 | .800 |
| George Mason † | 14 | – | 4 | .778 | 27 | – | 6 | .818 |
| Davidson | 13 | – | 5 | .722 | 19 | – | 14 | .576 |
| Saint Joseph's | 12 | – | 6 | .667 | 24 | – | 10 | .706 |
| Rhode Island | 11 | – | 7 | .611 | 17 | – | 16 | .515 |
| Dayton | 11 | – | 7 | .611 | 18 | – | 13 | .581 |
| UMass | 11 | – | 7 | .611 | 17 | – | 15 | .531 |
| Fordham | 9 | – | 9 | .500 | 15 | – | 15 | .500 |
| Duquesne | 9 | – | 9 | .500 | 21 | – | 13 | .618 |
| Saint Louis | 7 | – | 11 | .389 | 15 | – | 19 | .441 |
| VCU | 6 | – | 12 | .333 | 12 | – | 19 | .387 |
| George Washington | 5 | – | 13 | .278 | 13 | – | 18 | .419 |
| Loyola Chicago | 5 | – | 13 | .278 | 13 | – | 17 | .433 |
| La Salle | 3 | – | 15 | .167 | 10 | – | 23 | .303 |
| St. Bonaventure | 2 | – | 16 | .111 | 6 | – | 24 | .200 |
† 2025 A10 tournament winner

The 2024–25 Saint Joseph's Hawks women's basketball team represented Saint Joseph's University during the 2024–25 NCAA Division I women's basketball season. The Hawks, led by 24th-year head coach Cindy Griffin, played their home games at Hagan Arena in Philadelphia, Pennsylvania as members of the Atlantic 10 Conference.

== Previous season ==
The Hawks finished the 2023–24 season 28–6, 15–3 in A-10 play to finish in a tie for second place. They were upset by Rhode Island in the quarterfinals of the A-10 tournament. They received an at-large bid to the WBIT, where they would defeat Seton Hall in the first round and California in the second round, before falling to eventual tournament runner-up Villanova in the quarterfinals.

== Roster ==
2024–25 Saint Joseph's Hawks women's basketball team
Players
Coaches

| Pos. | # | Name | Height | Year | Previous school | Hometown |
|---|---|---|---|---|---|---|
| F | 0 | Talya Brugler | 6 ft 1 in (1.85 m) | Sr | Nazareth Area High School | Nazareth, Pennsylvania |
| G | 1 | Rhian Stokes | 5 ft 7 in (1.7 m) | Fr | Ewing High School | Ewing, New Jersey |
| G | 2 | Aleah Snead | 5 ft 11 in (1.8 m) | So | William Penn Charter School | Philadelphia, Pennsylvania |
| G | 3 | Emma Boslet | 5 ft 11 in (1.8 m) | GS | St. Thomas Aquinas High School | Edison, New Jersey |
| F | 4 | Laura Ziegler | 6 ft 2 in (1.88 m) | Jr | Falkonergaardens Gymnasium | Herlev, Denmark |
| G | 5 | Julia Nyström | 5 ft 7 in (1.7 m) | Sr | Polhemskolan Lund | Lund, Sweden |
| F | 9 | Meja Jägerskog | 6 ft 2 in (1.88 m) | Fr | RIG Luleå Elite Academy | Stockholm, Sweden |
| G | 11 | Kaylie Griffin | 5 ft 7 in (1.7 m) | Sr | Gwynedd Mercy Academy High School | Conshohocken, Pennsylvania |
| G | 15 | Gabby Casey | 5 ft 9 in (1.75 m) | So | Lansdale Catholic High School | Quakertown, Pennsylvania |
| G | 21 | Mackenzie Smith | 5 ft 10 in (1.78 m) | Sr | King's-Edgehill School | Shelburne, Nova Scotia |
| F | 30 | Paula Maurina | 6 ft 0 in (1.83 m) | GS | Hartford | Riga, Latvia |
| G | 31 | Lauren Greer | 5 ft 6 in (1.68 m) | Fr | Archbishop Wood High School | Philadelphia, Pennsylvania |
| G | 33 | Emirson Devenie | 6 ft 1 in (1.85 m) | Jr | Royal Crown Academy | Melbourne, Australia |
| C | 42 | Lizzy Gruber | 6 ft 4 in (1.93 m) | So | Gardiner Area High School | Gardiner, Maine |

Head coach

- Cindy Griffin (Saint Joseph's)

Assistant coach(es)

- Melissa Dunne (Temple)
- Katie Kuester (Saint Joseph's)
- Ashley Prim (Saint Joseph's)

Legend

- (C) Team captain
- (S) Suspended
- (I) Ineligible
- (W) Walk-on
- Injured
- Current redshirt

Roster
Last update: December 30, 2024

== Schedule and results ==
| Date time, TV | Rank^{#} | Opponent^{#} | Result | Record | High points | High rebounds | High assists | Site (attendance) city, state |
Non-conference regular season
| November 6, 2024*; 7:00 pm, ESPN+ | | Goldey–Beacom | W 102–30 | 1–0 | 22 – Smith | 13 – Tied | 5 – Tied | Hagan Arena (985); Philadelphia, PA |
| November 10, 2024*; 2:00 pm, ACCNX | | at Syracuse | W 84–70 | 2–0 | 29 – Brugler | 6 – Tied | 10 – Boslet | JMA Wireless Dome (2,215); Syracuse, NY |
| November 15, 2024*; 4:30 pm, ESPN+ | | at Penn; Big 5 Classic Pod 2 | W 68–57 | 3–0 | 21 – Brugler | 12 – Ziegler | 7 – Ziegler | The Palestra (632); Philadelphia, PA |
| November 20, 2024*; 8:30 pm, ESPN+ | | at Southern Utah | W 82–53 | 4–0 | 30 – Ziegler | 10 – Ziegler | 13 – Boslet | America First Event Center (369); Cedar City, UT |
| November 22, 2024*; 9:00 pm, ESPN+ | | at Utah | L 71–72 ^{OT} | 4–1 | 22 – Ziegler | 12 – Ziegler | 5 – Casey | Jon M. Huntsman Center (1,901); Salt Lake City, UT |
| November 27, 2024*; 3:00 pm, ESPN+ | | Saint Francis | W 88–35 | 5–1 | 18 – Brugler | 13 – Ziegler | 10 – Ziegler | Hagan Arena (650); Philadelphia, PA |
| December 1, 2024*; 2:00 pm, ESPN+/NBCSP | | Villanova; Big 5 Classic Pod 2/Holy War | L 65–81 | 5–2 | 18 – Smith | 11 – Ziegler | 6 – Ziegler | Hagan Arena (1,783); Philadelphia, PA |
| December 6, 2024*; 5:45 pm, NBCSP | | vs. Drexel; Big 5 Classic 3rd Place Game | W 69–47 | 6–2 | 23 – Smith | 8 – Brugler | 9 – Brugler | Finneran Pavilion; Villanova, PA |
| December 9, 2024*; 7:00 pm, ESPN+ | | Maine | W 74–48 | 7–2 | 26 – Smith | 16 – Ziegler | 6 – Ziegler | Hagan Arena (884); Philadelphia, PA |
| December 20, 2024*; 11:00 am, ESPN+ | | Howard; Hawk Classic | W 69–53 | 8–2 | 23 – Brugler | 11 – Ziegler | 10 – Ziegler | Hagan Arena (2,102); Philadelphia, PA |
| December 21, 2024*; 1:00 pm, ESPN+ | | Charleston; Hawk Classic | W 59–54 | 9–2 | 23 – Ziegler | 13 – Ziegler | 4 – Boslet | Hagan Arena (864); Philadelphia, PA |
A-10 regular season
| December 29, 2024; 2:00 pm, ESPN+ | | VCU | W 70–62 | 10–2 (1–0) | 25 – Smith | 8 – Smith | 4 – Tied | Hagan Arena (801); Philadelphia, PA |
| January 2, 2025; 12:00 pm, ESPN+ | | at George Mason | W 61–55 | 11–2 (2–0) | 18 – Brugler | 15 – Ziegler | 4 – Boslet | EagleBank Arena (3,354); Fairfax, VA |
| January 5, 2025; 2:00 pm, ESPN+ | | at La Salle | W 85–49 | 12–2 (3–0) | 22 – Ziegler | 17 – Ziegler | 6 – Boslet | John Glaser Arena (273); Philadelphia, PA |
| January 8, 2025; 7:00 pm, ESPN+ | | Duquesne | L 64–67 | 12–3 (3–1) | 10 – Snead | 13 – Ziegler | 5 – Tied | Hagan Arena (703); Philadelphia, PA |
| January 12, 2025; 2:00 pm, CBSSN | | at VCU | | | | | | Siegel Center; Richmond, VA |
| January 15, 2025; 7:00 pm, ESPN+ | | Fordham | | | | | | Hagan Arena; Philadelphia, PA |
| January 18, 2025; 12:00 pm, ESPN+ | | at UMass | | | | | | Mullins Center; Amherst, MA |
| January 22, 2025; 7:00 pm, ESPN+ | | St. Bonaventure | | | | | | Hagan Arena; Philadelphia, PA |
| January 25, 2025; 2:00 pm, ESPN+ | | La Salle | | | | | | Hagan Arena; Philadelphia, PA |
| January 29, 2025; 7:00 pm, ESPN+ | | at Davidson | | | | | | John M. Belk Arena; Davidson, NC |
| February 1, 2025; 2:00 pm, ESPN+ | | at George Washington | | | | | | Charles E. Smith Center; Washington, D.C. |
| February 5, 2025; 7:00 pm, ESPN+ | | Saint Louis | | | | | | Hagan Arena; Philadelphia, PA |
| February 9, 2025; 2:00 pm, ESPN+ | | Loyola Chicago | | | | | | Hagan Arena; Philadelphia, PA |
| February 13, 2025; 8:00 pm, Peacock | | at Richmond | | | | | | Robins Center; Richmond, VA |
| February 19, 2025; 6:30 pm, ESPN+ | | at Rhode Island | L 65−70 | 20−6 (11−4) | 15 – tied | 6 – Ziegler | 9 – Ziegler | Ryan Center (1,600); Kingston, RI |
| February 23, 2025; 4:00 pm, ESPNU | | George Mason | | | | | | Hagan Arena; Philadelphia, PA |
| February 26, 2025; 7:00 pm, ESPN+ | | at Dayton | | | | | | UD Arena; Dayton, OH |
| March 1, 2025; 2:00 pm, ESPN+ | | Richmond | | | | | | Hagan Arena; Philadelphia, PA |
A-10 tournament
| March 7, 2025; 1:30 pm, Peacock | (4) | vs. (5) Rhode Island; Quarterfinals | W 53–50 ^{OT} | 22–8 | 16 – Brugler | 8 – Ziegler | 4 – Tied | Henrico Sports & Events Center; Henrico, VA |
| March 8, 2025; 11:00 am, CBSSN | (4) | vs. (1) Richmond; Semifinals | W 50–49 | 23–8 | 13 – Smith | 7 – Casey | 3 – Ziegler | Henrico Sports & Events Center; Henrico, VA |
| March 9, 2025; 4:00 pm, ESPN2 | (4) | vs. (2) George Mason; Championship | L 58–73 | 23–9 | 19 – Smith | 6 – Brugler | 7 – Ziegler | Henrico Sports & Events Center (2,718); Henrico, VA |
WBIT
| March 20, 2025*; 7:00 pm, ESPN+ | (1) | Albany; First round | W 69–40 | 24–9 | 16 – Ziegler | 13 – Ziegler | 7 – Ziegler | Hagan Arena (342); Philadelphia, PA |
| March 23, 2025*; 2:00 pm, ESPN+ | (1) | (4) Villanova; Second round | L 60–62 | 24–10 | 19 – Ziegler | 10 – Ziegler | 8 – Ziegler | Hagan Arena (1,578); Philadelphia, PA |
*Non-conference game. ^{#}Rankings from AP Poll. (#) Tournament seedings in parentheses. All times are in Eastern.
