= 2024–25 Fordham Rams women's basketball team =

American college basketball season

2024–25 Fordham Rams women's basketball
- Conference: Atlantic 10 Conference
- Record: 15–15 (9–9 A–10)
- Head coach: Bridgette Mitchell (2nd season)
- Assistant coaches: Keturah Jackson; Andre Jurko; John Azzinaro; Janet Butler; Leah Metcalf
- Home arena: Rose Hill Gymnasium

2024–25 Atlantic 10 women's basketball standings
	Conf.				Overall
Team	W		L	PCT	W		L	PCT
Richmond	17	–	1	.944	28	–	7	.800
George Mason †	14	–	4	.778	27	–	6	.818
Davidson	13	–	5	.722	19	–	14	.576
Saint Joseph's	12	–	6	.667	24	–	10	.706
Rhode Island	11	–	7	.611	17	–	16	.515
Dayton	11	–	7	.611	18	–	13	.581
UMass	11	–	7	.611	17	–	15	.531
Fordham	9	–	9	.500	15	–	15	.500
Duquesne	9	–	9	.500	21	–	13	.618
Saint Louis	7	–	11	.389	15	–	19	.441
VCU	6	–	12	.333	12	–	19	.387
George Washington	5	–	13	.278	13	–	18	.419
Loyola Chicago	5	–	13	.278	13	–	17	.433
La Salle	3	–	15	.167	10	–	23	.303
St. Bonaventure	2	–	16	.111	6	–	24	.200
† 2025 A10 tournament winner

The 2024–25 Fordham Rams women's basketball team represented Fordham University during the 2024–25 NCAA Division I women's basketball season. The Rams, led by second-year head coach Bridgette Mitchell, played their home games at Rose Hill Gymnasium in the Bronx, New York, as members of the Atlantic 10 Conference (A-10 Conference).

They finished the season 15–15, 9–9 in A-10 play, to finish in a tie for eighth place. In the A-10 tournament, they were knocked out in the first round by Duquesne.

== Previous season ==
The Rams finished the 2023–24 season 12–17, 8–10 in A-10 play to finish in a three-way tie for eighth place. They were defeated by Loyola Chicago in the second round of the A-10 tournament.

== Roster ==
2024–25 Fordham Rams women's basketball team
Players
Coaches

Pos.	#	Name	Height	Year	Previous school	Hometown
G	1	Miya Giles-Jones	6 ft 0 in (1.83 m)	RS Fr	Terry Sanford High School	Fayetteville, NC
F	2	Karissa Antoine	5 ft 11 in (1.8 m)	Fr	Schalmont High School	Pattersonville, NY
G	3	Taylor Donaldson	5 ft 10 in (1.78 m)	GS	New Mexico State	Newbury Park, CA
G	4	Taya Davis	5 ft 7 in (1.7 m)	Sr	Garden City Community College	Decatur, IL
G	5	Chaé Harris	5 ft 8 in (1.73 m)	Jr	Appalachian State	Snellville, GA
F	6	Irene Murua	6 ft 0 in (1.83 m)	GS	Detroit Mercy	Arrasate, Spain
G	7	Camila De Pool	5 ft 7 in (1.7 m)	Fr	Lake Highland Prep	Carolina, Puerto Rico
F	9	Anastasija Veljovic	5 ft 11 in (1.8 m)	Jr	Fort Erie International Academy	Mississauga, ON
F	10	Rose Nelson	6 ft 1 in (1.85 m)	Jr	St Paul's Grammar School	Wallacia, Australia
F	11	Precious Omoshola	6 ft 2 in (1.88 m)	Fr	Storm King School	London, England
F	13	Emma Wilson-Saltos	5 ft 11 in (1.8 m)	Jr	Monroe	The Bronx, NY
G	23	Amiyah Ferguson	5 ft 8 in (1.73 m)	So	Timberland High School	St. Stephen, SC
F	25	Kaila Berry	5 ft 11 in (1.8 m)	Jr	St. John's Prep	Brooklyn, NY

Head coach

- Bridgette Mitchell (Duke)

Assistant coach(es)

- Keturah Jackson (Duke)
- Andre Jurko (Florida State)
- John Azzinaro (Bucknell)
- Janet Butler (Louisiana College)
- Leah Metcalf (North Carolina)

Legend

- (C) Team captain
- (S) Suspended
- (I) Ineligible
- (W) Walk-on
- Injured
- Current redshirt

Roster
Last update: January 3, 2025

== Schedule and results ==
Date time, TV	Rank^{#}	Opponent^{#}	Result	Record	High points	High rebounds	High assists	Site (attendance) city, state
Non-conference regular season
November 4, 2024*; 6:30 p.m., ESPN+		Adelphi	L 50–58	0–1	18 – Harris	4 – 4 tied	3 – Davis	Rose Hill Gymnasium (161); The Bronx, NY
November 8, 2024*; 6:30 p.m., ESPN+		Cal State Fullerton	W 66–51	1–1	13 – Omoshola	11 – Murua	5 – Davis	Rose Hill Gymnasium (364); The Bronx, NY
November 12, 2024*; 7:00 p.m., FloHoops		at Seton Hall	L 44–67	1–2	8 – 2 tied	7 – Nelson	4 – Davis	Walsh Gymnasium (665); South Orange, NJ
November 15, 2024*; 7:00 p.m., ESPN+		Saint Peter's	W 64–56	2–2	21 – Donaldson	4 – 4 tied	5 – Ferguson	Rose Hill Gymnasium (204); The Bronx, NY
November 20, 2024*; 7:00 p.m., ESPN+		at Manhattan; Battle of the Bronx	L 58–65	2–3	20 – Donaldson	6 – 3 tied	4 – 2 tied	Draddy Gymnasium (800); Riverdale, NY
November 23, 2024*; 7:30 p.m., ESPN+		Siena	W 90–51	3–3	19 – Donaldson	8 – Davis	6 – Davis	Rose Hill Gymnasium (321); The Bronx, NY
December 1, 2024*; 4:00 p.m., FloHoops		at Stony Brook	W 64–55	4–3	23 – Murua	8 – 2 tied	4 – Davis	Island Federal Arena (2,172); Stony Brook, NY
December 4, 2024*; 6:00 p.m., ESPN+		at Yale	W 71–54	5–3	23 – Davis	6 – Wilson-Saltos	5 – Donaldson	John J. Lee Amphitheater (459); New Haven, CT
December 8, 2024*; 2:30 p.m., ESPN+		LIU	W 62–43	6–3	14 – Donaldson	8 – Antoine	4 – Davis	Rose Hill Gymnasium; The Bronx, NY
December 21, 2024*; 8:00 p.m., ACCNX		at No. 24 California; Raising the B.A.R Invitational semifinal	L 53–69	6–4	24 – Donaldson	9 – Murua	5 – Davis	Haas Pavilion (1,856); Berkeley, CA
December 22, 2024*; 6:00 p.m., ESPN+		vs. Xavier; Raising the B.A.R Invitational third-place game	L 62–71	6–5	24 – Donaldson	12 – Murua	5 – 2 tied	Haas Pavilion; Berkeley, CA
A-10 regular season
December 29, 2024; 1:00 p.m., ESPN+		at UMass	L 61–78	6–6 (0–1)	25 – Donaldson	9 – Murua	6 – Harris	Mullins Center (1,393); Amherst, MA
January 2, 2025; 6:30 p.m., ESPN+		Richmond	W 80–78	7–6 (1–1)	24 – Murua	4 – 2 tied	8 – Davis	Rose Hill Gymnasium (278); The Bronx, NY
January 5, 2025; 2:00 p.m., ESPN+		at Duquesne	W 64–62	8–6 (2–1)	17 – Donaldson	11 – Murua	4 – Davis	UPMC Cooper Fieldhouse (886); Pittsburgh, PA
January 8, 2025; 11:00 a.m., ESPN+		George Washington	W 61–53	9–6 (3–1)	16 – Donaldson	6 – 2 tied	5 – Davis	Rose Hill Gymnasium (2,850); The Bronx, NY
January 11, 2025; 2:00 p.m., ESPN+		at Loyola Chicago	W 68–53	10–6 (4–1)	17 – Donaldson	5 – 2 tied	9 – Davis	Joseph J. Gentile Arena (502); Chicago, IL
January 15, 2025; 7:00 p.m., ESPN+		at Saint Joseph's	L 65–72	10–7 (4–2)	19 – Harris	7 – Davis	6 – Davis	Hagan Arena (900); Philadelphia, PA
January 18, 2025; 2:00 p.m., SNY/ESPN+		Dayton	W 58–55	11–7 (5–2)	19 – Donaldson	7 – Wilson-Saltos	3 – Davis	Rose Hill Gymnasium (628); The Bronx, NY
January 25, 2025; 2:00 p.m., ESPN+		St. Bonaventure	W 51–49	12–7 (6–2)	19 – Donaldson	8 – 2 tied	4 – Davis	Rose Hill Gymnasium (478); The Bronx, NY
January 29, 2025; 6:30 p.m., ESPN+		Rhode Island	L 35–53	12–8 (6–3)	12 – Harris	7 – 2 tied	1 – 2 tied	Rose Hill Gymnasium (226); The Bronx, NY
February 1, 2025; 8:00 p.m., ESPN+		at Saint Louis	L 53–59 ^{OT}	12–9 (6–4)	21 – Donaldson	8 – Veljovic	6 – Davis	Chaifetz Arena (1,165); St. Louis, MO
February 4, 2025; 6:00 p.m., ESPN+		at George Washington	L 59–69	12–10 (6–5)	23 – Murua	9 – Antoine	3 – 3 tied	Charles E. Smith Center (645); Washington, D.C.
February 8, 2025; 2:00 p.m., ESPN+		George Mason	L 43–70	12–11 (6–6)	11 – Harris	10 – Murua	2 – 2 tied	Rose Hill Gymnasium (610); The Bronx, NY
February 12, 2025; 6:30 p.m., ESPN+		at La Salle	W 61–58	13–11 (7–6)	22 – Harris	6 – Donaldson	13 – Davis	John Glaser Arena (148); Philadelphia, PA
February 16, 2025; 2:00 p.m., YES/ESPN+		VCU	L 57–76	13–12 (7–7)	15 – Murua	8 – Murua	4 – 2 tied	Rose Hill Gymnasium (454); The Bronx, NY
February 19, 2025; 7:00 p.m., YES/ESPN+		Duquesne	W 56–53	14–12 (8–7)	15 – Harris	11 – Berry	2 – 2 tied	Rose Hill Gymnasium (316); The Bronx, NY
February 22, 2025; 1:00 p.m., ESPN+		at Dayton	L 57–62	14–13 (8–8)	20 – Davis	8 – Murua	5 – Davis	UD Arena (2,269); Dayton, OH
February 26, 2025; 7:00 p.m., SNY/ESPN+		La Salle	W 72–51	15–13 (9–8)	23 – Murua	9 – Wilson-Saltos	11 – Davis	Rose Hill Gymnasium (307); The Bronx, NY
March 1, 2025; 1:00 p.m., ESPN+		at Davidson	L 52–64	15–14 (9–9)	17 – Donaldson	8 – Murua	3 – 2 tied	John M. Belk Arena (1,094); Davidson, NC
A-10 tournament
March 6, 2025; 11:00 a.m., ESPN+	(8)	vs. (9) Duquesne; Second round	L 63–79	15–15	19 – Murua	12 – Murua	3 – 2 tied	Henrico Sports & Events Center; Henrico, VA
*Non-conference game. ^{#}Rankings from AP poll. (#) Tournament seedings in parentheses. All times are in Eastern.
