= 2024–25 UMass Minutewomen basketball team =

American college basketball season

2024–25 UMass Minutewomen basketball

WNIT, Second Round
- Conference: Atlantic 10 Conference
- Record: 17–15 (11–7 A–10)
- Head coach: Mike Leflar (2nd season)
- Assistant coaches: Yolanda Cole; Clare Fitzpatrick; Samera Marsh
- Home arena: Mullins Center

2024–25 Atlantic 10 women's basketball standings
	Conf.				Overall
Team	W		L	PCT	W		L	PCT
Richmond	17	–	1	.944	28	–	7	.800
George Mason †	14	–	4	.778	27	–	6	.818
Davidson	13	–	5	.722	19	–	14	.576
Saint Joseph's	12	–	6	.667	24	–	10	.706
Rhode Island	11	–	7	.611	17	–	16	.515
Dayton	11	–	7	.611	18	–	13	.581
UMass	11	–	7	.611	17	–	15	.531
Fordham	9	–	9	.500	15	–	15	.500
Duquesne	9	–	9	.500	21	–	13	.618
Saint Louis	7	–	11	.389	15	–	19	.441
VCU	6	–	12	.333	12	–	19	.387
George Washington	5	–	13	.278	13	–	18	.419
Loyola Chicago	5	–	13	.278	13	–	17	.433
La Salle	3	–	15	.167	10	–	23	.303
St. Bonaventure	2	–	16	.111	6	–	24	.200
† 2025 A10 tournament winner

The 2024–25 UMass Minutewomen basketball team represented the University of Massachusetts Amherst during the 2024–25 NCAA Division I women's basketball season. The Minutewomen, led by second-year head coach Mike Leflar, played their home games at the Mullins Center in Amherst, Massachusetts as members of the Atlantic 10 Conference. This will be UMass' last season as members of the Atlantic 10 Conference, as UMass will be moving to the Mid-American Conference, starting in the 2025–26 season.

== Previous season ==
The Minutewomen finished the 2023–24 season 5–27, 2–16 in A–10 play to finish in 14th place. They defeated La Salle, before falling to Duquesne in the second round of the A–10 tournament.

== Roster ==
2024–25 UMass Minutewomen women's basketball team
Players
Coaches

Pos.	#	Name	Height	Year	Previous school	Hometown
G	1	Taylor Derkack	6 ft 0 in (1.83 m)	Fr	Colonia High School	Colonia, New Jersey
C	2	Chinenye Odenigbo	6 ft 4 in (1.93 m)	So	Noble and Greenough School	Walpole, Massachusetts
G	4	Lilly Ferguson	5 ft 10 in (1.78 m)	Jr	Newington High School	Newington, Connecticut
F	5	Aleah Sorrentino	6 ft 2 in (1.88 m)	RS Sr	Lipscomb	Palm Bay, Florida
G	10	Yahmani McKayle	5 ft 6 in (1.68 m)	Fr	South Shore High School	Queens, New York
F	11	Megan Olbrys	6 ft 1 in (1.85 m)	Jr	Villanova	Norwood, Massachusetts
G	13	Kasey Bretones	5 ft 11 in (1.8 m)	Fr	Mainland Regional High School	Linwood, New Jersey
G	14	Dallas Pierce	5 ft 9 in (1.75 m)	So	Sanford School	New Castle, Delaware
F	22	Mikenzie Jones	6 ft 1 in (1.85 m)	Jr	Denver	Aurora, Colorado
G	23	Momo LaClair	5 ft 10 in (1.78 m)	Sr	Drexel	Syracuse, New York
G	24	Allie Palmieri	5 ft 10 in (1.78 m)	Sr	Seton Hall	Trumbull, Connecticut
F	30	Jess Ross	6 ft 3 in (1.91 m)	Fr	Tabor Academy	Eastham, Massachusetts
G	44	Stefanie Kulesza	6 ft 0 in (1.83 m)	Sr	Conrad Schools of Science	Wilmington, Delaware

Head coach

- Mike Leflar (Boston College)

Assistant coach(es)

- Yolanda Cole (Michigan)
- Clare Fitzpatrick (Cornell)
- Samera Marsh (Saint Peter's)

Legend

- (C) Team captain
- (S) Suspended
- (I) Ineligible
- (W) Walk-on
- Injured
- Current redshirt

Roster
Last update: December 31, 2024

== Schedule and results ==
Date time, TV	Rank^{#}	Opponent^{#}	Result	Record	High points	High rebounds	High assists	Site (attendance) city, state
Non-conference regular season
November 4, 2024*; 8:00 pm, ESPN+		at Harvard	L 58–71	0–1	15 – Palmieri	13 – Olbrys	5 – Olbrys	Lavietes Pavilion (752); Cambridge, MA
November 7, 2024*; 6:00 pm, ESPN+		New Hampshire	L 45–48	0–2	20 – Palmieri	12 – Olbrys	3 – LaClair	Mullins Center (1,033); Amherst, MA
November 10, 2024*; 1:00 pm, ESPN+		Central Connecticut	W 66–60	1–2	21 – McKayle	8 – Olbrys	7 – McKayle	Mullins Center (1,054); Amherst, MA
November 15, 2024*; 6:00 pm, ESPN+		Monmouth	W 76–53	2–2	20 – Olbrys	9 – Ross	6 – McKayle	Mullins Center (964); Amherst, MA
November 20, 2024*; 6:00 pm, NESN/ESPN+		Holy Cross	L 70–75	2–3	14 – Tied	10 – Kulesza	4 – Olbrys	Mullins Center (940); Amherst, MA
November 23, 2024*; 1:00 pm, ESPN+		Army	L 50–56	2–4	21 – Palmieri	13 – Ferguson	3 – Olbrys	Mullins Center (959); Amherst, MA
December 1, 2024*; 2:00 pm, ESPN+		at Siena	L 53–57	2–5	21 – Olbrys	11 – Olbrys	2 – Tied	UHY Center (652); Loudonville, NY
December 5, 2024*; 6:00 pm, NESN/ESPN+		Northeastern	W 81–50	3–5	19 – Palmieri	6 – Ferguson	7 – Olbrys	Mullins Center (915); Amherst, MA
December 8, 2024*; 6:30 pm, ESPN+		at Dartmouth	W 67–56	4–5	19 – McKayle	11 – Olbrys	4 – McKayle	Leede Arena (603); Hanover, NH
December 11, 2024*; 11:00 am, ACCNX		at Boston College	L 57–62	4–6	14 – McKayle	9 – Olbrys	6 – Palmieri	Conte Forum (3,116); Chestnut Hill, MA
December 20, 2024*; 1:00 pm, ESPN+		at UMass Lowell	W 53–33	5–6	15 – Olbrys	13 – Olbrys	4 – Olbrys	Costello Athletic Center (194); Lowell, MA
A–10 regular season
December 29, 2024; 1:00 pm, NESN/ESPN+		Fordham	W 78–61	6–6 (1–0)	31 – Palmieri	8 – Odenigbo	7 – Olbrys	Mullins Center (1,393); Amherst, MA
January 2, 2025; 8:00 pm, ESPN+		at Saint Louis	W 72–55	7–6 (2–0)	21 – Kulesza	12 – Kulesza	3 – Kulesza	Chaifetz Arena (729); St. Louis, MO
January 5, 2025; 1:00 pm, ESPN+		Richmond	L 52–82	7–7 (2–1)	18 – McKayle	4 – Tied	3 – McKayle	Mullins Center (1,100); Amherst, MA
January 8, 2025; 7:00 pm, ESPN+		at Dayton	L 64–67	7–8 (2–2)	18 – McKayle	6 – Olbrys	4 – LaClair	UD Arena (1,470); Dayton, OH
January 12, 2025; 1:00 pm, ESPN+		at St. Bonaventure	W 67–58	8–8 (3–2)	18 – Olbrys	10 – Olbrys	2 – Tied	Reilly Center (188); St. Bonaventure, NY
January 15, 2025; 11:00 am, NESN/ESPN+		La Salle	W 82–66	9–8 (4–2)	22 – Olbrys	9 – Tied	5 – McKayle	Mullins Center (2,898); Amherst, MA
January 18, 2025; 12:00 pm, ESPN+		Saint Joseph's	L 55–67	9–9 (4–3)	21 – Olbrys	7 – Palmieri	5 – Tied	Mullins Center (1,035); Amherst, MA
January 22, 2025; 6:35 pm, ESPN+		at Rhode Island	L 58–60	9–10 (4–4)	16 – McKayle	7 – Palmieri	2 – Palmieri	Ryan Center (1,045); Kingston, RI
January 25, 2025; 1:00 pm, ESPN+		at VCU	W 54–49	10–10 (5–4)	13 – Olbrys	11 – Kulesza	3 – Tied	Siegel Center (1,124); Richmond, VA
January 29, 2025; 6:00 pm, NESN/ESPN+		George Washington	W 71–54	11–10 (6–4)	17 – Kulesza	10 – Olbrys	5 – McKayle	Mullins Center (1,195); Amherst, MA
February 2, 2025; 2:00 pm, ESPN+		at La Salle	W 60–50	12–10 (7–4)	17 – Olbrys	9 – Kulesza	5 – McKayle	John Glaser Arena (215); Philadelphia, PA
February 5, 2025; 6:00 pm, ESPN+		St. Bonaventure	W 81–54	13–10 (8–4)	21 – McKayle	6 – Ferguson	8 – Olbrys	Mullins Center (1,001); Amherst, MA
February 8, 2025; 1:00 pm, ESPN+		Davidson	L 38–56	13–11 (8–5)	14 – McKayle	6 – Odenigbo	3 – McKayle	Mullins Center (1,472); Amherst, MA
February 12, 2025; 6:00 pm, ESPN+		at Duquesne	W 72–52	14–11 (9–5)	20 – Olbrys	22 – Kulesza	4 – Tied	UPMC Cooper Fieldhouse (1,167); Pittsburgh, PA
February 16, 2025; 3:00 pm, ESPN+		at George Mason	L 67–76	14–12 (9–6)	21 – McKayle	9 – Olbrys	8 – McKayle	EagleBank Arena (2,697); Fairfax, VA
February 19, 2025; 6:00 pm, ESPN+		Loyola Chicago	W 87–62	15–12 (10–6)	23 – Olbrys	13 – Olbrys	8 – McKayle	Mullins Center (1,352); Amherst, MA
February 23, 2025; 1:00 pm, ESPN+		Rhode Island	L 40–42	15–13 (10–7)	11 – Tied	10 – Kulesza	3 – Olbrys	Mullins Center (1,410); Amherst, MA
February 26, 2025; 12:00 pm, ESPN+		at George Washington	W 61–55	16–13 (11–7)	20 – Olbrys	5 – Tied	4 – Kulesza	Charles E. Smith Center (1,509); Washington, D.C.
A-10 tournament
March 6, 2025; 5:00 pm, ESPN+	(7)	vs. (10) Saint Louis; Second round	L 57–67	16–14	15 – McKayle	8 – Kulesza	2 – Tied	Henrico Sports & Events Center; Henrico, VA
WNIT
March 20, 2025; 6:00 pm, ESPN+		Stonehill; First Round	W 86–40	17–14	20 – Olbrys	10 – Tied	10 – McKayle	Mullins Center (336); Amherst, MA
March 23, 2025; 2:00 pm, ESPN+		at Buffalo; Second Round	L 82–84 ^{OT}	17–15	19 – McKayle	13 – Olbrys	8 – Olbrys	Alumni Arena (947); Buffalo, NY
*Non-conference game. ^{#}Rankings from AP Poll. (#) Tournament seedings in parentheses. All times are in Eastern.
