= 2024–25 Loyola Ramblers women's basketball team =

American college basketball season

2024–25 Loyola Ramblers women's basketball
- Conference: Atlantic 10 Conference
- Record: 12–16 (4–13 A-10)
- Head coach: Allison Guth (3rd season)
- Assistant coaches: Marsha Frese; Jordan McCann; Simon Harris; Jenna Rubino-McCormick; Mai-Loni Henson
- Home arena: Joseph J. Gentile Arena

2024–25 Atlantic 10 women's basketball standings
	Conf.				Overall
Team	W		L	PCT	W		L	PCT
Richmond	17	–	1	.944	28	–	7	.800
George Mason †	14	–	4	.778	27	–	6	.818
Davidson	13	–	5	.722	19	–	14	.576
Saint Joseph's	12	–	6	.667	24	–	10	.706
Rhode Island	11	–	7	.611	17	–	16	.515
Dayton	11	–	7	.611	18	–	13	.581
UMass	11	–	7	.611	17	–	15	.531
Fordham	9	–	9	.500	15	–	15	.500
Duquesne	9	–	9	.500	21	–	13	.618
Saint Louis	7	–	11	.389	15	–	19	.441
VCU	6	–	12	.333	12	–	19	.387
George Washington	5	–	13	.278	13	–	18	.419
Loyola Chicago	5	–	13	.278	13	–	17	.433
La Salle	3	–	15	.167	10	–	23	.303
St. Bonaventure	2	–	16	.111	6	–	24	.200
† 2025 A10 tournament winner

The 2024–25 Loyola Ramblers women's basketball team represented Loyola University Chicago during the 2024–25 NCAA Division I women's basketball season. The Ramblers, led by third-year head coach Allison Guth, played their home games at the Joseph J. Gentile Arena in Chicago, Illinois as members of the Atlantic 10 Conference (A-10).

== Previous season ==
The Ramblers finished the 2023–24 season 15–16, 8–10 in A-10 play, to finish in a three-way tie for eighth place. They defeated Fordham, before falling to top-seeded and eventual tournament champions Richmond in the quarterfinals of the A-10 tournament.

== Roster ==
2024–25 Loyola Ramblers women's basketball team
Players
Coaches

Pos.	#	Name	Height	Year	Previous school	Hometown
F	0	Yasmyn Palmer	6 ft 2 in (1.88 m)	Fr	Cranbrook Kingswood High School	Southfield, MI
F	1	Roisin Grandberry	6 ft 3 in (1.91 m)	Fr	Rolling Meadows High School	Arlington Heights, IL
G	2	Alexa Kinas	5 ft 8 in (1.73 m)	Fr	Kaukauna High School	Kaukauna, WI
G	3	Holly Dolny	5 ft 8 in (1.73 m)	Fr	Heathdale Christian College	Werribee, Australia
G	4	Audrey Deptula	6 ft 0 in (1.83 m)	So	Middleton High School	Verona, WI
G	6	Rosalie Mercille	5 ft 9 in (1.75 m)	So	Monmouth	Montreal, QC
G	8	Thoranna Kika Hodge-Carr	5 ft 8 in (1.73 m)	GS	Iona	Keflavík, Iceland
G/F	9	Emma Theodorsson	6 ft 1 in (1.85 m)	Jr	Bucknell	Pittsburgh, PA
G	10	Jess Finney	6 ft 0 in (1.83 m)	Sr	San Diego	Phoenix, AZ
G	11	Kendall Hendrix	5 ft 10 in (1.78 m)	Fr	West Bloomfield High School	West Bloomfield, MI
G	13	Kira Chivers	5 ft 3 in (1.6 m)	Jr	Marist	Chicago, IL
F	15	Sitori Tanin	6 ft 2 in (1.88 m)	GS	Middleton High School	Middleton, WI
F	21	Brooklyn Vaughn	6 ft 0 in (1.83 m)	Fr	Central Catholic High School	Maumee, OH
G	22	Naelle Bernard	5 ft 5 in (1.65 m)	GS	Duquesne	Paris, France
F	30	Destiny Jackson	5 ft 10 in (1.78 m)	Sr	Snider High School	Fort Wayne, IN

Head coach

- Allison Guth (Illinois)

Assistant coach(es)

- Marsha Frese (Rice)
- Jordan McCann (Illinois)
- Simon Harris (NC State)
- Jenna Rubino-McCormick (DePaul)
- Mai-Loni Henson (Washington)

Legend

- (C) Team captain
- (S) Suspended
- (I) Ineligible
- (W) Walk-on
- Injured
- Current redshirt

Roster
Last update: January 5, 2025

== Schedule and results ==
Date time, TV	Rank^{#}	Opponent^{#}	Result	Record	High points	High rebounds	High assists	Site (attendance) city, state
Exhibition
October 27, 2024*; 12:00 p.m.		Elmhurst	W 108–41	–	21 – Vaughn	9 – Tanin	6 – Kinas	Joseph J. Gentile Arena (293); Chicago, IL
Regular season
November 4, 2024*; 5:00 p.m., ESPN+		Kentucky State; Loyolapalooza	W 91–56	1–0	17 – Bernard	7 – tied	6 – Finney	Joseph J. Gentile Arena (555); Chicago, IL
November 9, 2024*; 7:00 p.m., ESPN+		West Georgia	W 76–60	2–0	19 – Finney	5 – Hodge-Carr	5 – Tanin	Joseph J. Gentile Arena (419); Chicago, IL
November 12, 2024*; 7:00 p.m., Marquee		DePaul; Commuter Night	L 60–75	2–1	15 – Bernard	3 – Theodorsson	5 – Bernard	Joseph J. Gentile Arena (616); Chicago, IL
November 16, 2024*; 1:00 p.m., ESPN+		at SIU Edwardsville	W 57–52	3–1	14 – Chivers	6 – Tanin	3 – tied	First Community Arena (669); Edwardsville, IL
November 19, 2024*; 5:00 p.m., ESPN+		Valparaiso	W 70–62	4–1	18 – Bernard	5 – Theodorsson	5 – Chivers	Joseph J. Gentile Arena (451); Chicago, IL
November 23, 2024*; 2:00 p.m., ESPN+		at Eastern Illinois	L 60–66	4–2	14 – Finney	6 – Tanin	7 – Chivers	Groniger Arena (100); Charleston, IL
November 26, 2024*; 6:00 p.m., ESPN+		Northwestern	L 64–73	4–3	17 – Chivers	7 – tied	4 – tied	Joseph J. Gentile Arena (567); Chicago, IL
November 30, 2024*; 1:00 p.m., ESPN+		South Carolina State	W 67–39	5–3	10 – Finney	7 – Theodorsson	4 – tied	Joseph J. Gentile Arena (297); Chicago, IL
December 3, 2024; 5:00 p.m., ESPN+		La Salle	L 45–55	5–4 (0–1)	17 – Tanin	7 – Tanin	4 – Chivers	Joseph J. Gentile Arena (500); Chicago, IL
December 7, 2024*; 12:00 p.m., ESPN+		at Western Michigan	W 57–46	6–4	11 – Chivers	8 – Theodorsson	3 – tied	University Arena (682); Kalamazoo, MI
December 17, 2024*; 11:00 a.m., Marquee		Chicago State; Field Trip Day	W 70–68 ^{OT}	7–4	24 – Bernard	11 – Tanin	5 – tied	Joseph J. Gentile Arena (3,455); Chicago, IL
December 21, 2024*; 2:00 p.m., ESPN+		Evansville	W 70–57	8–4	20 – Tanin	9 – Tanin	5 – Bernard	Joseph J. Gentile Arena (447); Chicago, IL
December 29, 2024; 2:00 p.m., ESPN+		St. Bonaventure	W 57–40	9–4 (1–1)	13 – tied	8 – Theodorsson	6 – Chivers	Joseph J. Gentile Arena (395); Chicago, IL
January 2, 2025; 6:00 p.m., ESPN+		at Dayton	L 45–83	9–5 (1–2)	10 – Theodorsson	4 – Kinas	4 – Kinas	UD Arena (1,565); Dayton, OH
January 5, 2025; 11:00 a.m., ESPN+		at George Washington	W 67–63	10–5 (2–2)	15 – Hodge-Carr	7 – team	3 – Chivers	Charles E. Smith Center (409); Washington, D.C.
January 8, 2025; 6:00 p.m., ESPN+		VCU	L 44–62	10–6 (2–3)	17 – Finney	7 – Theodorsson	4 – Chivers	Joseph J. Gentile Arena (317); Chicago, IL
January 11, 2025; 1:00 p.m., ESPN+		Fordham; Crohn's Disease Cause Game	L 53–68	10–7 (2–4)	15 – Theodorsson	7 – Theodorsson	4 – Hodge-Carr	Joseph J. Gentile Arena (502); Chicago, IL
January 15, 2025; 6:00 p.m., ESPN+		at George Mason	L 39–69	10–8 (2–5)	12 – Hodge-Carr	6 – Kinas	2 – Hendrix	EagleBank Arena (853); Fairfax, VA
January 18, 2025; 7:00 p.m., ESPN+		at Saint Louis	W 66–63	11–8 (3–5)	22 – Theodorsson	11 – Hodge-Carr	5 – Hodge-Carr	Chaifetz Arena (904); St. Louis, MO
January 23, 2025; 6:00 p.m., ESPN+		Richmond; Pride Night	L 45–85	11–9 (3–6)	15 – Kinas	7 – Theodorsson	4 – Kinas	Joseph J. Gentile Arena (409); Chicago, IL
January 26, 2025; 12:00 p.m., ESPN+		at Rhode Island	L 49–67	11–10 (3–7)	15 – Deptula	5 – team	1 – Kinas	Ryan Center (1,635); Kingston, RI
January 29, 2025; 6:00 p.m., ESPN+		Dayton	L 64–67	11–11 (3–8)	11 – Finney	4 – Theodorsson	3 – Hendrix	Joseph J. Gentile Arena (412); Chicago, IL
February 5, 2025; 6:00 p.m., ESPN+		at Davidson	L 51–68	11–12 (3–9)	13 – Bernard	4 – tied	3 – Tanin	John M. Belk Arena (647); Davidson, NC
February 9, 2025; 1:00 p.m., ESPN+		at Saint Joseph's	L 45–83	11–13 (3–10)	12 – Bernard	7 – Tanin	2 – tied	Hagan Arena (548); Philadelphia, PA
February 12, 2025; 6:00 p.m., ESPN+		George Washington; Pink Game	L 41–53	11–14 (3–11)	10 – Finney	6 – Finney	3 – tied	Joseph J. Gentile Arena (224); Chicago, IL
February 15, 2025; 2:00 p.m., ESPN+		Duquesne; National Girls and Women in Sports Day	L 70–75	11–15 (3–12)	25 – Bernard	7 – Tanin	4 – Chivers	Joseph J. Gentile Arena (1,663); Chicago, IL
February 19, 2025; 5:00 p.m., ESPN+		at UMass	L 62–87	11–16 (3–13)	16 – Theodorsson	8 – Tanin	4 – Chivers	Mullins Center (1,352); Amherst, MA
February 26, 2025; 5:00 p.m., ESPN+		at VCU	W 52–50	12–16 (4–13)	22 – Theodorsson	5 – tied	3 – tied	Siegel Center (1,084); Richmond, VA
March 1, 2025; 2:00 p.m., ESPN+		Saint Louis; Senior Day / Alumni Day	W 63–62	13–16 (5–13)	17 – Tanin	11 – Tanin	5 – Theodorsson	Joseph J. Gentile Arena (1,095); Chicago, IL
A-10 tournament
March 5, 2025; 12:00 p.m., ESPN+	(13)	vs. (12) George Washington; First Round	L 44–65	13–17	13 – Bernard	7 – Theodorsson	1 – tied	Henrico Sports & Events Center; Henrico, VA
*Non-conference game. ^{#}Rankings from AP poll. (#) Tournament seedings in parentheses. All times are in Central.

== See also ==
- 2024–25 Loyola Ramblers men's basketball team
