= 2024–25 Dayton Flyers women's basketball team =

American college basketball season

2024–25 Dayton Flyers women's basketball
- Conference: Atlantic 10 Conference
- Record: 18–13 (11–7 A–10)
- Head coach: Tamika Williams-Jeter (3rd season)
- Assistant coaches: Kalisha Keane; Bryce Agler; Darryl Hudson; Trendale Perkins; Colleen Day Henderson
- Home arena: UD Arena

2024–25 Atlantic 10 women's basketball standings
	Conf.				Overall
Team	W		L	PCT	W		L	PCT
Richmond	17	–	1	.944	28	–	7	.800
George Mason †	14	–	4	.778	27	–	6	.818
Davidson	13	–	5	.722	19	–	14	.576
Saint Joseph's	12	–	6	.667	24	–	10	.706
Rhode Island	11	–	7	.611	17	–	16	.515
Dayton	11	–	7	.611	18	–	13	.581
UMass	11	–	7	.611	17	–	15	.531
Fordham	9	–	9	.500	15	–	15	.500
Duquesne	9	–	9	.500	21	–	13	.618
Saint Louis	7	–	11	.389	15	–	19	.441
VCU	6	–	12	.333	12	–	19	.387
George Washington	5	–	13	.278	13	–	18	.419
Loyola Chicago	5	–	13	.278	13	–	17	.433
La Salle	3	–	15	.167	10	–	23	.303
St. Bonaventure	2	–	16	.111	6	–	24	.200
† 2025 A10 tournament winner

The 2024–25 Dayton Flyers women's basketball team represented the University of Dayton during the 2024–25 NCAA Division I women's basketball season. The Flyers, led by third-year head coach Tamika Williams-Jeter, played their home games at UD Arena in Dayton, Ohio, as members of the Atlantic 10 Conference.

== Previous season ==
The Flyers finished the 2023–24 season 12–19, 5–13 in A–10 play to finish in a tie for 12th place. They defeated St. Bonaventure, before falling to Rhode Island in the second round of the A–10 tournament.

== Roster ==
2024–25 Dayton Flyers women's basketball team
Players
Coaches

Pos.	#	Name	Height	Year	Previous school	Hometown
G	0	Denika Lightbourne	5 ft 9 in (1.75 m)	So	Tallulah Falls School	Nassau, Bahamas
G	1	Nayo Lear	5 ft 10 in (1.78 m)	Jr	Example Sports Academy	South Holland, Illinois
G	4	Shantavia Dawkins	5 ft 8 in (1.73 m)	Jr	Iowa State	Brampton, Ontario
F	5	Arianna Smith	6 ft 2 in (1.88 m)	Sr	Indiana State	Columbus, Ohio
G	6	Rikki Harris	5 ft 10 in (1.78 m)	GS	Ohio State	Indianapolis, Indiana
G	7	Olivia Leung	5 ft 10 in (1.78 m)	Fr	Crestwood Prep	Calgary, Alberta
G	10	Ivy Wolf	5 ft 8 in (1.73 m)	Sr	Miami (OH)	Minster, Ohio
G	12	Jayda Johnson	6 ft 1 in (1.85 m)	So	Boston College	West Haven, Connecticut
F	13	Shannon Wheeler	6 ft 1 in (1.85 m)	Sr	Renaissance High School	Detroit, Michigan
G/F	14	Ajok Madol	6 ft 3 in (1.91 m)	So	Minnesota	Regina, Saskatchewan
G	21	Nicole Stephens	5 ft 7 in (1.7 m)	GS	Columbia	Pickerington, Ohio
F	24	Kamryn Grant	6 ft 2 in (1.88 m)	Jr	Africentric High School	Columbus, Ohio
F/C	35	Molly O'Riordan	6 ft 2 in (1.88 m)	Fr	Barrington High School	Barrington, Illinois
G	42	Eleanor Monyek	6 ft 0 in (1.83 m)	Jr	Hinsdale Central High School	Clarendon Hills, Illinois
C	50	Eve Fiala	6 ft 5 in (1.96 m)	So	Indiana Area Senior High School	Indiana, Pennsylvania

Head coach

- Tamika Williams-Jeter (Connecticut)

Assistant coach(es)

- Kalisha Keane (Michigan State)
- Bryce Agler (Wittenberg)
- Darryl Hudson (Howard)
- Trendale Perkins (Ohio)
- Colleen Day Henderson (Miami (OH))

Legend

- (C) Team captain
- (S) Suspended
- (I) Ineligible
- (W) Walk-on
- Injured
- Current redshirt

Roster
Last update: January 3, 2025

== Schedule and results ==
Date time, TV	Rank^{#}	Opponent^{#}	Result	Record	High points	High rebounds	High assists	Site (attendance) city, state
Non-conference regular season
November 5, 2024*; 7:00 pm, ESPN+		Southeast Missouri State	W 75–70	1–0	15 – Stephens	10 – Smith	3 – Wolf	UD Arena (1,042); Dayton, OH
November 8, 2024*; 7:00 pm, ESPN+		Delaware State	W 79–44	2–0	22 – Wolf	9 – Madol	5 – Wolf	UD Arena (1,111); Dayton, OH
November 14, 2024*; 7:00 pm, ACCNX		at No. 16 Duke	L 49–84	2–1	14 – Wolf	7 – Wolf	2 – Tied	Cameron Indoor Stadium (1,976); Durham, NC
November 17, 2024*; 1:00 pm, ESPN+		Tennessee State	W 76–58	3–1	23 – Wolf	10 – Smith	6 – Harris	UD Arena (1,902); Dayton, OH
November 21, 2024*; 7:00 pm, ESPN+		Providence	W 65–61	4–1	16 – Wolf	10 – Smith	5 – Stephens	UD Arena (1,457); Dayton, OH
November 25, 2024*; 12:00 pm, BallerTV		vs. Maryland Eastern Shore; Music City Classic	L 56–62	4–2	26 – Wolf	6 – Madol	4 – Stephens	Trevecca Trojan Fieldhouse (126); Nashville, TN
November 26, 2024*; 12:00 pm, BallerTV		vs. South Dakota; Music City Classic	L 69–79	4–3	15 – Stephens	9 – Smith	4 – Tied	Trevecca Trojan Fieldhouse (221); Nashville, TN
December 1, 2024*; 1:00 pm, ESPN+		Central Connecticut	W 65–38	5–3	20 – Smith	10 – Smith	3 – Tied	UD Arena (1,538); Dayton, OH
December 5, 2024*; 7:00 pm, ESPN+		Miami (OH)	L 43–60	5–4	11 – Wolf	7 – Smith	2 – Wolf	UD Arena (1,565); Dayton, OH
December 15, 2024*; 1:00 pm, ESPN+		Central Michigan	W 72–68	6–4	16 – Smith	9 – Smith	7 – Harris	UD Arena (1,616); Dayton, OH
December 19, 2024*; 7:00 pm, ESPN+		Vanderbilt	L 66–80	6–5	23 – Wolf	12 – Smith	5 – Harris	UD Arena (1,632); Dayton, OH
A–10 regular season
December 29, 2024; 2:00 pm, ESPN+		at Richmond	L 37–55	6–6 (0–1)	7 – Tied	6 – Smith	3 – Wolf	Robins Center (1,466); Richmond, VA
January 2, 2025; 7:00 pm, ESPN+		Loyola Chicago	W 83–45	7–6 (1–1)	17 – Tied	10 – Smith	4 – Tied	UD Arena (1,565); Dayton, OH
January 5, 2025; 1:00 pm, ESPN+		at VCU	W 69–49	8–6 (2–1)	33 – Wolf	7 – Tied	3 – Tied	Siegel Center (540); Richmond, VA
January 8, 2025; 7:00 pm, ESPN+		UMass	W 67–64	9–6 (3–1)	26 – Wolf	16 – Smith	5 – Stephens	UD Arena (1,470); Dayton, OH
January 11, 2025; 1:00 pm, ESPN+		La Salle	W 79–61	10–6 (4–1)	22 – Wolf	15 – Smith	7 – Stephens	UD Arena (1,470); Dayton, OH
January 15, 2025; 6:00 pm, ESPN+		at Duquesne	W 80–71	11–6 (5–1)	22 – Stephens	10 – Harris	4 – Tied	UPMC Cooper Fieldhouse (975); Pittsburgh, PA
January 18, 2025; 2:00 pm, ESPN+		at Fordham						Rose Hill Gymnasium; Bronx, NY
January 22, 2025; 7:00 pm, ESPN+		Saint Louis						UD Arena; Dayton, OH
January 26, 2025; 1:00 pm, ESPN+		Richmond						UD Arena; Dayton, OH
January 29, 2025; 7:00 pm, ESPN+		at Loyola Chicago						Joseph J. Gentile Arena; Chicago, IL
February 1, 2025; 1:00 pm, ESPN+		George Mason						UD Arena; Dayton, OH
February 8, 2025; 1:00 pm, ESPN+		at Rhode Island	L 36−57	13−10 (7−5)	11 – Wolf	8 – Harris	2 – tied	Ryan Center (1,169); Kingston, RI
February 12, 2025; 11:00 am, ESPN+		Davidson						UD Arena; Dayton, OH
February 15, 2025; 2:00 pm, ESPN+		at George Washington						Charles E. Smith Center; Washington, D.C.
February 19, 2025; 8:00 pm, ESPN+		at Saint Louis						Chaifetz Arena; St. Louis, MO
February 22, 2025; 1:00 pm, ESPN+		Fordham						UD Arena; Dayton, OH
February 26, 2025; 7:00 pm, ESPN+		Saint Joseph's						UD Arena; Dayton, OH
March 1, 2025; 1:00 pm, ESPN+		at St. Bonaventure						Reilly Center; St. Bonaventure, NY
A-10 tournament
March 6, 2025; 7:30 pm, ESPN+	(6)	vs. (14) La Salle; Second round	W 60–45	18–12	14 – Wolf	7 – Wolf	4 – Tied	Henrico Sports & Events Center (1,254); Henrico, VA
March 7, 2025; 7:30 pm, Peacock	(6)	vs. (3) Davidson; Quarterfinals						Henrico Sports & Events Center; Henrico, VA
*Non-conference game. ^{#}Rankings from AP Poll. (#) Tournament seedings in parentheses. All times are in Eastern.
