= 2024–25 St. Bonaventure Bonnies women's basketball team =

American college basketball season

2024–25 St. Bonaventure Bonnies women's basketball
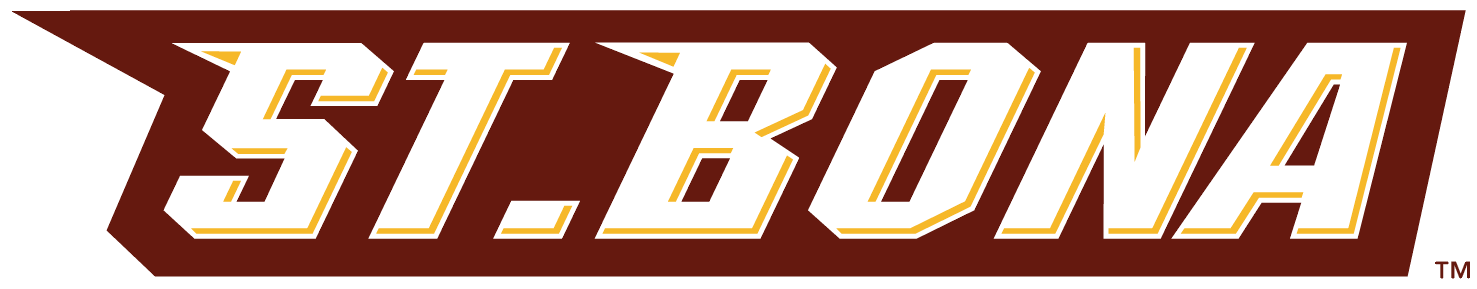
- Conference: Atlantic 10 Conference
- Record: 6–22 (2–15 A–10)
- Head coach: Jim Crowley (2nd season, 18th overall season)
- Associate head coach: Tiara Johnson
- Assistant coaches: Kelcie Rombach; Jim Brunelli
- Home arena: Reilly Center

2024–25 Atlantic 10 women's basketball standings
	Conf.				Overall
Team	W		L	PCT	W		L	PCT
Richmond	17	–	1	.944	28	–	7	.800
George Mason †	14	–	4	.778	27	–	6	.818
Davidson	13	–	5	.722	19	–	14	.576
Saint Joseph's	12	–	6	.667	24	–	10	.706
Rhode Island	11	–	7	.611	17	–	16	.515
Dayton	11	–	7	.611	18	–	13	.581
UMass	11	–	7	.611	17	–	15	.531
Fordham	9	–	9	.500	15	–	15	.500
Duquesne	9	–	9	.500	21	–	13	.618
Saint Louis	7	–	11	.389	15	–	19	.441
VCU	6	–	12	.333	12	–	19	.387
George Washington	5	–	13	.278	13	–	18	.419
Loyola Chicago	5	–	13	.278	13	–	17	.433
La Salle	3	–	15	.167	10	–	23	.303
St. Bonaventure	2	–	16	.111	6	–	24	.200
† 2025 A10 tournament winner

The 2024–25 St. Bonaventure Bonnies women's basketball team represented St. Bonaventure University during the 2024–25 NCAA Division I women's basketball season. The Bonnies, led by head coach Jim Crowley in the second season of his second stint (18th overall), played their home games at the Reilly Center in St. Bonaventure, New York as members of the Atlantic 10 Conference (A–10).

== Previous season ==
The Bonnies finished the 2023–24 season 4–26, 1–17 in A–10 play, to finish in 15th place. As the #14 seed in the A–10 tournament, they were defeated by #11 seed Dayton in the first round.

== Roster ==
2024–25 St. Bonaventure Bonnies women's basketball team
Players
Coaches

Pos.	#	Name	Height	Year	Previous school	Hometown
G	0	Lena Walz	5 ft 10 in (1.78 m)	Fr	Cathedral Prep	Erie, PA
G	1	Mackenzie Pettinelli	5 ft 10 in (1.78 m)	Fr	Spring-Ford	Collegeville, PA
G	2	Nadechka Laccen	5 ft 6 in (1.68 m)	RS Sr	Tyler Junior College	San Juan, Puerto Rico
G	3	Macy Smith	5 ft 6 in (1.68 m)	Fr	Strasburg High School	Strasburg, VA
G	6	Aurore Eyango	5 ft 9 in (1.75 m)	Jr	Clarendon College	Lille, France
G	10	Mya Davidson	6 ft 2 in (1.88 m)	Jr	Three Rivers Community College	Rockford, IL
F	15	Gabby Robinson Forde	6 ft 2 in (1.88 m)	Jr	Gulf Coast State	Brampton, ON
G	20	Tamar voor de Poort	6 ft 0 in (1.83 m)	Jr	Lekdetec.nl	Doetinchem, Netherlands
F	21	Caitlin Frost	6 ft 1 in (1.85 m)	Fr	Champlain College Saint-Lambert	Les Coteaux, QC
G	22	Dani Haskell	5 ft 6 in (1.68 m)	RS Sr	Canisius	Franklinville, NY
G	32	Zoe Shaw	5 ft 7 in (1.7 m)	Fr	Keilor Thunder	Melbourne, Australia
G	33	Hannah Richardson	6 ft 1 in (1.85 m)	Fr	Hoosac School	Auckland, New Zealand

Head coach

- Jim Crowley (Keuka)

Assistant coach(es)

- Tiara Johnson (St. Bonaventure)
- Kelcie Rombach (St. Bonaventure)
- Jim Brunelli (Clarion)

Legend

- (C) Team captain
- (S) Suspended
- (I) Ineligible
- (W) Walk-on
- Injured
- Current redshirt

Roster
Last update: January 28, 2025

== Schedule and results ==
Date time, TV	Rank^{#}	Opponent^{#}	Result	Record	High points	High rebounds	High assists	Site (attendance) city, state
Exhibition
November 1, 2024*; 6:00 p.m., ESPN+		Daemen	W 62–48	–	20 – Haskell	8 – Robinson Forde	5 – Laccen	Reilly Center (219); St. Bonaventure, NY
Non-conference regular season
November 9, 2024*; 1:00 p.m., ESPN+		Binghamton	W 82–61	1–0	19 – Middleton	6 – Pettinelli	6 – Pettinelli	Reilly Center (347); St. Bonaventure, NY
November 12, 2024*; 6:30 p.m., ESPN+		at Youngstown State	L 52–60	1–1	24 – Haskell	8 – Middleton	4 – Haskell	Beeghly Center (1,602); Youngstown, OH
November 16, 2024*; 12:00 p.m., ESPN+		at Bowling Green	W 92–41	1–2	9 – Richardson	5 – Smith	2 – Haskell	Stroh Center (1,513); Bowling Green, OH
November 19, 2024*; 6:00 p.m., ESPN+		at Canisius	W 66–63	2–2	29 – Haskell	6 – Pettinelli	4 – Pettinelli	Koessler Athletic Center (785); Buffalo, NY
November 23, 2024*; 1:00 p.m., ESPN+		Colgate	L 72–82	2–3	22 – Haskell	6 – Middleton	4 – Shaw	Reilly Center (303); St. Bonaventure, NY
November 27, 2024*; 12:00 p.m., ESPN+		Loyola (MD)	L 42–60	2–4	12 – Shaw	7 – Frost	3 – Haskell	Reilly Center (352); St. Bonaventure, NY
November 30, 2024*; 2:00 p.m., ESPN+		at Buffalo	L 46–74	2–5	12 – Laccen	7 – Middleton	3 – Laccen	Alumni Arena (1,091); Buffalo, NY
December 5, 2024*; 6:30 p.m., ESPN+/YES		Cornell	L 56–94	3–5	27 – Haskell	6 – Walz	2 – Fields	Reilly Center (126); St. Bonaventure, NY
December 14, 2024*; 2:00 p.m., ESPN+		at UAlbany	L 48–64	3–6	16 – Frost	5 – Richardson	2 – Pettinelli	Broadview Center (1,047); Albany, NY
December 17, 2024*; 6:30 p.m., ESPN+/YES		Niagara	W 76–68	4–6	18 – Haskell	9 – Haskell	3 – Haskell	Reilly Center (305); St. Bonaventure, NY
December 21, 2024*; 4:00 p.m., ESPN+		at Robert Morris	L 41–65	4–7	14 – Shaw	8 – Shaw	1 – Walz	UPMC Events Center (213); Carnot-Moon, PA
A–10 regular season
December 29, 2024; 3:00 p.m., ESPN+		at Loyola Chicago	L 40–57	4–8 (0–1)	14 – Haskell	8 – Frost	3 – Shaw	Joseph J. Gentile Arena (395); Chicago, IL
January 2, 2025; 1:00 p.m., ESPN+		Rhode Island	L 48–82	4–9 (0–2)	17 – Shaw	4 – Pettinelli	2 – Smith	Reilly Center (189); St. Bonaventure, NY
January 5, 2025; 3:00 p.m., ESPN+		at George Mason						EagleBank Arena; Fairfax, VA
January 8, 2025; 6:00 p.m., ESPN+		Saint Louis						Reilly Center; St. Bonaventure, NY
January 12, 2025; 1:00 p.m., ESPN+/YES		UMass						Reilly Center; St. Bonaventure, NY
January 15, 2025; 6:00 p.m., ESPN+		at Richmond						Robins Center; Richmond, VA
January 18, 2025; 1:00 p.m., ESPN+		Davidson						Reilly Center; St. Bonaventure, NY
January 22, 2025; 7:00 p.m., ESPN+		at Saint Joseph's						Hagan Arena; Philadelphia, PA
January 25, 2025; 2:00 p.m., ESPN+		at Fordham						Rose Hill Gym; The Bronx, NY
January 29, 2025; 6:00 p.m., ESPN+		La Salle						Reilly Center; St. Bonaventure, NY
February 2, 2025; 1:00 p.m., ESPN+/YES		Duquesne	L 46−80	5−17 (1−10)	11 – Haskell	10 – Robinson Forde	4 – Frost	Reilly Center (346); St. Bonaventure, NY
February 5, 2025; 6:00 p.m., ESPN+		at UMass						Mullins Center; Amherst, MA
February 8, 2025; 1:00 p.m., ESPN+		George Washington						Reilly Center; St. Bonaventure, NY
February 16, 2025; 1:00 p.m., ESPN+		at Davidson						John M. Belk Arena; Davidson, NC
February 19, 2025; 6:00 p.m., ESPN+		VCU						Reilly Center; St. Bonaventure, NY
February 22, 2025; 2:00 p.m., ESPN+		at La Salle						John Glaser Arena; Philadelphia, PA
February 26, 2025; 11:00 a.m., ESPN+		at Duquesne	L 48−74	6−22 (2−15)	13 – Pettinelli	5 – Shaw	3 – Shaw	UPMC Cooper Fieldhouse (3,115); Pittsburgh, PA
March 1, 2025; 1:00 p.m., ESPN+		Dayton	L 57−67	6−23 (2−16)	20 – Haskell	6 – Richardson	2 – 2 tied	Reilly Center (205); St. Bonaventure, NY
A–10 tournament
March 5, 2025; 2:30 p.m., ESPN+	(15)	vs. (10) Saint Louis; First round	L 50–60	6–24	14 – Frost	9 – Haskell	3 – 2 tied	Henrico Sports & Events Center; Henrico, VA
*Non-conference game. ^{#}Rankings from AP poll. (#) Tournament seedings in parentheses. All times are in Eastern.
