= 2024–25 VCU Rams women's basketball team =

American college basketball season

2024–25 VCU Rams women's basketball
- Conference: Atlantic 10 Conference
- Record: 12–19 (6–12 A–10)
- Head coach: Beth O'Boyle (11th season)
- Assistant coaches: Kirk Crawford; Brittany Parker; Candice M. Jackson; Dylan Nsiah-Amoako
- Home arena: Siegel Center

2024–25 Atlantic 10 women's basketball standings
	Conf.				Overall
Team	W		L	PCT	W		L	PCT
Richmond	17	–	1	.944	28	–	7	.800
George Mason †	14	–	4	.778	27	–	6	.818
Davidson	13	–	5	.722	19	–	14	.576
Saint Joseph's	12	–	6	.667	24	–	10	.706
Rhode Island	11	–	7	.611	17	–	16	.515
Dayton	11	–	7	.611	18	–	13	.581
UMass	11	–	7	.611	17	–	15	.531
Fordham	9	–	9	.500	15	–	15	.500
Duquesne	9	–	9	.500	21	–	13	.618
Saint Louis	7	–	11	.389	15	–	19	.441
VCU	6	–	12	.333	12	–	19	.387
George Washington	5	–	13	.278	13	–	18	.419
Loyola Chicago	5	–	13	.278	13	–	17	.433
La Salle	3	–	15	.167	10	–	23	.303
St. Bonaventure	2	–	16	.111	6	–	24	.200
† 2025 A10 tournament winner

The 2024–25 VCU Rams women's basketball team represented Virginia Commonwealth University during the 2024–25 NCAA Division I women's basketball season. The Rams, led by eleventh-year head coach Beth O'Boyle, played their home games at the Siegel Center in Richmond, Virginia, as members of the Atlantic 10 Conference.

== Previous season ==
The Rams finished the 2023–24 season 26–6, 15–3 in A–10 play to finish in a tie for second place. They were upset by Saint Louis in the quarterfinals of the A–10 tournament. They received an at-large bid to the WBIT, where they would be fall to eventual tournament runner-up Villanova in the first round.

== Roster ==
2024–25 VCU Rams women's basketball team
Players
Coaches

Pos.	#	Name	Height	Year	Previous school	Hometown
G	2	Cyriah Griffin	5 ft 7 in (1.7 m)	Fr	Menchville High School	Virginia Beach, Virginia
G	3	Timaya Lewis-Eutsey	5 ft 8 in (1.73 m)	Jr	Life Center Academy	Trenton, New Jersey
G	4	Grace Hutson	5 ft 9 in (1.75 m)	RS Sr	St. Joseph Central Catholic High School	Christiansburg, Virginia
G	5	Adebukola Akomolafe	5 ft 9 in (1.75 m)	RS Jr	Americas High School	El Paso, Texas
G	7	Mahaila Harrison	6 ft 0 in (1.83 m)	So	DME Academy	Vancouver, Washington
G	11	Mary-Anna Asare	5 ft 8 in (1.73 m)	Jr	J. Addison School	Pickering, Ontario
F	12	Valentina Ojeda	6 ft 0 in (1.83 m)	Sr	Independence Community College	Punta Arenas, Chile
G	13	Zoli Khalil	6 ft 0 in (1.83 m)	So	Spotswood High School	Rockingham, Virginia
G	14	Natalia Tondi	5 ft 7 in (1.7 m)	Sr	Florida SouthWestern State	Buenos Aires, Argentina
G	21	Deniz Torgut	5 ft 10 in (1.78 m)	RS So	Botas Gelisim Ankara	İzmir, Turkey
F	22	Jennifer Ezeh	6 ft 2 in (1.88 m)	GS	Missouri State	Nibo, Nigeria
F	31	Isabel Whitelaw	6 ft 3 in (1.91 m)	Fr	Shepparton Gators	Shepparton, Australia
F	32	Lucía Sotelo	6 ft 1 in (1.85 m)	So	Ensino Lugo	Ourense, Spain
F	34	Mykel Parham	6 ft 1 in (1.85 m)	GS	Creighton	Burnsville, Minnesota

Head coach

- Beth O'Boyle (Gettysburg)

Assistant coach(es)

- Kirk Crawford (Western Colorado)
- Brittany Parker (St. Augustine's)
- Candice M. Jackson (Michigan State)
- Dylan Nsiah-Amoako (Georgia State)

Legend

- (C) Team captain
- (S) Suspended
- (I) Ineligible
- (W) Walk-on
- Injured
- Current redshirt

Roster
Last update: January 3, 2025

== Schedule and results ==
Date time, TV	Rank^{#}	Opponent^{#}	Result	Record	High points	High rebounds	High assists	Site (attendance) city, state
Non-conference regular season
November 6, 2024*; 6:00 pm, ESPN+		Maryland Eastern Shore	W 75–60	1–0	28 – Lewis-Eutsey	8 – Parham	6 – Lewis-Eutsey	Siegel Center (562); Richmond, VA
November 10, 2024*; 2:00 pm		at Howard	W 72–48	2–0	20 – Asare	9 – Tied	5 – Lewis-Eutsey	Burr Gymnasium (2,100); Washington, D.C.
November 15, 2024*; 7:00 pm, ESPN+		Temple	L 55–59	2–1	19 – Asare	8 – Parham	3 – Khalil	Siegel Center (6,093); Richmond, VA
November 21, 2024*; 6:30 pm, ESPN+		at Old Dominion; Rivalry	L 51–53 ^{OT}	2–2	17 – Asare	13 – Parham	3 – Khalil	Chartway Arena (1,949); Norfolk, VA
November 24, 2024*; 1:00 pm, ESPN+		Rider	W 75–60	3–2	15 – Lewis-Eutsey	9 – Parham	5 – Lewis-Eutsey	Siegel Center (451); Richmond, VA
November 28, 2024*; 11:00 am, FloHoops		vs. Providence; Cancún Challenge Mayan Division	W 57–51	4–2	17 – Asare	10 – Parham	3 – Asare	Hard Rock Hotel Riviera Maya (250); Cancún, Mexico
November 29, 2024*; 1:30 pm, FloHoops		vs. San Diego State; Cancún Challenge Mayan Division	L 46–55	4–3	16 – Asare	13 – Parham	1 – Tied	Hard Rock Hotel Riviera Maya (211); Cancún, Mexico
November 30, 2024*; 1:30 pm, FloHoops		vs. Wisconsin; Cancún Challenge Mayan Division	L 45–58	4–4	14 – Asare	9 – Asare	3 – Lewis-Eutsey	Hard Rock Hotel Riviera Maya (121); Cancún, Mexico
December 5, 2024*; 6:00 pm, ESPN+		James Madison	L 42–55	4–5	13 – Asare	12 – Parham	2 – Lewis-Eutsey	Siegel Center (825); Richmond, VA
December 9, 2024*; 4:30 pm, ESPN+		Delaware State	W 79–43	5–5	18 – Asare	6 – Ezeh	3 – Tied	Siegel Center (357); Richmond, VA
December 18, 2024*; 6:00 pm, ESPN+		at East Carolina	L 46–48	5–6	14 – Asare	11 – Parham	3 – Tied	Williams Arena (1,086); Greenville, NC
December 21, 2024*; 1:00 pm, ESPN+		LIU	W 72–42	6–6	14 – Asare	5 – Tied	5 – Torgut	Siegel Center (454); Richmond, VA
A–10 regular season
December 29, 2024; 2:00 pm, ESPN+		at Saint Joseph's	L 62–70	6–7 (0–1)	21 – Ojeda	7 – Parham	3 – Asare	Hagan Arena (801); Philadelphia, PA
January 2, 2025; 6:00 pm, ESPN+		Duquesne	W 65–63	7–7 (1–1)	37 – Asare	15 – Parham	2 – Tied	Siegel Center (546); Richmond, VA
January 5, 2025; 1:00 pm, ESPN+		Dayton	L 49−69	7−8 (1−2)	9 – Tied	12 – Parham	4 – Asare	Siegel Center (540); Richmond, VA
January 8, 2025; 7:00 pm, ESPN+		at Loyola Chicago	W 62−44	8−8 (2−2)	18 – Tied	15 – Parham	4 – Hutson	Joseph J. Gentile Arena (317); Chicago, IL
January 12, 2025; 2:00 pm, CBSSN		Saint Joseph's	W 57−50	9−8 (3−2)	26 – Asare	17 – Parham	4 – Asare	Siegel Center (1,662); Richmond, VA
January 15, 2025; 6:00 pm, ESPN+		Rhode Island	L 50−64	9−9 (3−3)	20 – Khalil	10 – Parham	3 – Asare	Siegel Center (472); Richmond, VA
January 19, 2025; 2:00 pm, CBSSN		at Richmond; Capital City Classic	L 42−75	9−10 (3−4)	– -	– -	– -	Robins Center (3,462); Richmond, VA
January 22, 2025; 6:00 pm, ESPN+		at George Washington						Charles E. Smith Center; Washington, D.C.
January 25, 2025; 1:00 pm, ESPN+		UMass						Siegel Center; Richmond, VA
January 30, 2025; 8:00 pm, Peacock		at Duquesne	L 59−69	10−12 (4−6)	19 – Asare	13 – Parham	6 – Khalil	UPMC Cooper Fieldhouse (878); Pittsburgh, PA
February 2, 2025; 12:00 pm, CBSSN		Davidson						Siegel Center; Richmond, VA
February 5, 2025; 7:00 pm, ESPN+		at George Mason; Rivalry						EagleBank Arena; Fairfax, VA
February 13, 2025; 11:00 am, ESPN+		Saint Louis						Siegel Center; Richmond, VA
February 16, 2025; 2:00 pm, ESPN+		at Fordham						Rose Hill Gymnasium; Bronx, NY
February 19, 2025; 6:00 pm, ESPN+		at St. Bonaventure						Reilly Center; St. Bonaventure, NY
February 23, 2025; 1:30 pm, ESPN+		Richmond; Capital City Classic						Siegel Center; Richmond, VA
February 26, 2025; 6:00 pm, ESPN+		Loyola Chicago						Siegel Center; Richmond, VA
March 1, 2025; 2:00 pm, ESPN+		at La Salle	L 60−61	12−18 (6−12)	18 – Asare	11 – Parham	6 – Griffin	John Glaser Arena (355); Philadelphia, PA
A-10 tournament
March 5, 2025; 5:00 pm, ESPN+	(11)	vs. (14) La Salle; First round	L 48–50	12–19	20 – Asare	13 – Parham	3 – Asare	Henrico Sports & Events Center (1,986); Henrico, VA
*Non-conference game. ^{#}Rankings from AP Poll. (#) Tournament seedings in parentheses. All times are in Eastern.
