= 2024–25 La Salle Explorers women's basketball team =

American college basketball season

2024–25 La Salle Explorers women's basketball
- Conference: Atlantic 10 Conference
- Record: 8–22 (2–15 A–10)
- Head coach: Mountain MacGillivray (7th season)
- Associate head coach: Chris Day
- Assistant coaches: Gillian Abshire; Jeryn Reese
- Home arena: John Glaser Arena

2024–25 Atlantic 10 women's basketball standings
	Conf.				Overall
Team	W		L	PCT	W		L	PCT
Richmond	17	–	1	.944	28	–	7	.800
George Mason †	14	–	4	.778	27	–	6	.818
Davidson	13	–	5	.722	19	–	14	.576
Saint Joseph's	12	–	6	.667	24	–	10	.706
Rhode Island	11	–	7	.611	17	–	16	.515
Dayton	11	–	7	.611	18	–	13	.581
UMass	11	–	7	.611	17	–	15	.531
Fordham	9	–	9	.500	15	–	15	.500
Duquesne	9	–	9	.500	21	–	13	.618
Saint Louis	7	–	11	.389	15	–	19	.441
VCU	6	–	12	.333	12	–	19	.387
George Washington	5	–	13	.278	13	–	18	.419
Loyola Chicago	5	–	13	.278	13	–	17	.433
La Salle	3	–	15	.167	10	–	23	.303
St. Bonaventure	2	–	16	.111	6	–	24	.200
† 2025 A10 tournament winner

The 2024–25 La Salle Explorers women's basketball team represented La Salle University during the 2024–25 NCAA Division I women's basketball season. The Explorers, led by seventh-year head coach Mountain MacGillivray, played their home games at John Glaser Arena in Philadelphia, Pennsylvania as members of the Atlantic 10 Conference.

== Previous season ==
The Explorers finished the 2023–24 season 8–22, 5–13 in A–10 play to finish in a tie for 12th place. They were defeated by UMass in the first round of the A–10 tournament.

== Roster ==
2024–25 La Salle Explorers women's basketball team
Players
Coaches

Pos.	#	Name	Height	Year	Previous school	Hometown
G	0	Aryss Macktoon	5 ft 11 in (1.8 m)	So	St. Timothy's School	Baltimore, Maryland
G	3	Lauren Patnode	6 ft 0 in (1.83 m)	Fr	Perkiomen School	Saratoga Springs, New York
G/F	8	Diora Ressaissi	6 ft 0 in (1.83 m)	Fr	Long Island Lutheran High School	Orlando, Florida
G	9	Irene Garcia	6 ft 1 in (1.85 m)	Fr	Real Canoe	Madrid, Spain
G	10	Alisa Blalock	5 ft 6 in (1.68 m)	Jr	Caldwell	Uniondale, New York
F	11	Ivy Fox	6 ft 0 in (1.83 m)	Jr	Coffeyville Community College	Garrison, North Dakota
G	12	Ayisse Magassa	6 ft 1 in (1.85 m)	Jr	Clarendon College	Morsang-sur-Orge, France
G	13	Joan Quinn	5 ft 9 in (1.75 m)	Fr	Cardinal O'Hara High School	Newtown Square, Pennsylvania
G	14	Vega Gil	6 ft 2 in (1.88 m)	Jr	Raritan Valley Community College	Pamplona, Spain
G	15	Ashleigh Connor	5 ft 11 in (1.8 m)	RS So	Saint Louis	Pittsburgh, Pennsylvania
F	20	Anna Przyszlak	6 ft 1 in (1.85 m)	Jr	Cowley Community College	Gdańsk, Poland
G	21	Ty'Renisha Bowers	5 ft 8 in (1.73 m)	Jr	Southern Arkansas Tech	Natchez, Louisiana
G	24	Sania Jenkins	5 ft 11 in (1.8 m)	Fr	Etiwanda High School	Narrabeen, Australia
F	25	Mackenzie Daleba	6 ft 0 in (1.83 m)	GS	Fairfield	Dorchester, Massachusetts
G	30	Jolene Armendariz	6 ft 0 in (1.83 m)	GS	San Francisco State	Hemet, California

Head coach

- Mountain MacGillivray (Temple)

Assistant coach(es)

- Chris Day (West Chester)
- Gillian Abshire (Quinnipiac)
- Jeryn Reese (La Salle)

Legend

- (C) Team captain
- (S) Suspended
- (I) Ineligible
- (W) Walk-on
- Injured
- Current redshirt

Roster
Last update: December 30, 2024

== Schedule and results ==
Date time, TV	Rank^{#}	Opponent^{#}	Result	Record	High points	High rebounds	High assists	Site (attendance) city, state
Regular season
November 4, 2024*; 11:00 am, ESPN+		at Maine	L 51–65	0–1	13 – Magassa	9 – Armendariz	3 – Daleba	Memorial Gymnasium (1,507); Orono, ME
November 9, 2024*; 12:00 pm, ESPN+		Delaware	W 68–54	1–1	21 – Connor	9 – Tied	3 – Tied	John Glaser Arena; Philadelphia, PA
November 13, 2024*; 6:00 pm, FloHoops		at Drexel; Big 5 Classic Pod 1	L 40–73	1–2	6 – Tied	6 – Tied	3 – Daleba	Daskalakis Athletic Center (652); Philadelphia, PA
November 17, 2024*; 2:00 pm, ACCNX		at Virginia	L 47–76	1–3	16 – Quinn	11 – Connor	5 – Connor	John Paul Jones Arena (4,054); Charlottesville, VA
November 20, 2024*; 6:30 pm, ESPN+		Rider	W 55–54	2–3	20 – Connor	12 – Daleba	4 – Quinn	John Glaser Arena (211); Philadelphia, PA
November 23, 2024*; 2:00 pm, ESPN+		at American	W 69–60	3–3	22 – Macktoon	9 – Quinn	5 – Connor	Bender Arena (411); Washington, D.C.
November 26, 2024*; 4:30 pm, ESPN+		Lehigh	W 65–62	4–3	15 – Tied	7 – Connor	4 – Connor	John Glaser Arena (286); Philadelphia, PA
December 1, 2024*; 2:00 pm, ESPN+		Temple; Big 5 Classic Pod 1	L 68–73	4–4	14 – Macktoon	8 – Connor	4 – Tied	John Glaser Arena (192); Philadelphia, PA
December 3, 2024; 6:00 pm, ESPN+		at Loyola Chicago	W 55–45	5–4 (1–0)	11 – Tied	7 – Armendariz	5 – Tied	Joseph J. Gentile Arena (500); Chicago, IL
December 6, 2024*; 3:30 pm, NBCSP+		vs. Penn; Big 5 Classic 5th Place Game	L 63–74	5–5	13 – Connor	5 – Tied	3 – Tied	Finneran Pavilion (1,526); Villanova, PA
December 13, 2024*; 6:00 pm, ESPN+		Chestnut Hill	W 95–46	6–5	19 – Magassa	13 – Daleba	6 – Bowers	John Glaser Arena (128); Philadelphia, PA
December 17, 2024*; 8:00 pm, SECN+		at No. 6 Texas	L 49–111	6–6	7 – Tied	4 – Tied	1 – Tied	Moody Center (6,386); Austin, TX
December 20, 2024*; 5:00 pm		vs. Northern Kentucky; UC San Diego Winter Classic	W 70–67	7–6	18 – Quinn	6 – Armendariz	3 – Tied	LionTree Arena (135); La Jolla, CA
December 21, 2025*; 6:30 pm, ESPN+		at UC San Diego; UC San Diego Winter Classic	L 53–69	7–7	11 – Magassa	7 – Macktoon	4 – Tied	LionTree Arena (357); La Jolla, CA
December 29, 2024; 2:00 pm, ESPN+		George Washington	L 54–65	7–8 (1–1)	12 – Connor	7 – Magassa	4 – Connor	John Glaser Arena (187); Philadelphia, PA
January 2, 2025; 7:00 pm, ESPN+		at Davidson	L 61−78	7−9 (1−2)	14 – Quinn	8 – Connor	2 – Bowers	John M. Belk Arena (679); Davidson, NC
January 5, 2025; 2:00 pm, ESPN+		Saint Joseph's	L 49−85	7−10 (1−3)	9 – Connor	6 – Tied	4 – Connor	John Glaser Arena (273); Philadelphia, PA
January 11, 2025; 1:00 pm, ESPN+		at Dayton	L 61−79	7−11 (1−4)	18 – Connor	10 – Magassa	4 – Connor	UD Arena (1,470); Dayton, OH
January 15, 2025; 11:00 am, ESPN+		at UMass	L 66−82	7−12 (1−5)	13 – Tied	9 – Connor	5 – Connor	Mullins Center (2,898); Amherst, MA
January 18, 2025; 2:00 pm, ESPN+		George Mason	L 40−57	7−13 (1−6)	15 – Quinn	9 – Daleba	2 – Connor	John Glaser Arena (382); Philadelphia, PA
January 22, 2025; 11:00 am, ESPN+		Duquesne	L 57−67	7−14 (1−7)	16 – Connor	18 – Daleba	4 – Connor	John Glaser Arena (185); Philadelphia, PA
January 25, 2025; 2:00 pm, ESPN+		at Saint Joseph's	L 52−76	7−15 (1−8)	23 – Quinn	6 – Quinn	3 – Quinn	Hagan Arena (1,195); Philadelphia, PA
January 29, 2025; 6:00 pm, ESPN+		at St. Bonaventure	W 67−58	8−15 (2−8)	21 – Quinn	10 – Tied	4 – Przyszlak	Reilly Center (375); St. Bonaventure, NY
February 2, 2025; 2:00 pm, ESPN+		UMass	L 50−60	8−16 (2−9)	16 – Connor	7 – Magassa	4 – Tied	John Glaser Arena (215); Philadelphia, PA
February 5, 2025; 6:30 pm, ESPN+		Richmond	L 53−72	8−7 (2−10)	15 – Armendariz	9 – Magassa	4 – Quinn	John Glaser Arena (189); Philadelphia, PA
February 8, 2025; 8:00 pm, ESPN+		at Saint Louis	L 51−73	8−18 (2−11)	20 – Armendariz	6 – Magassa	4 – Connor	Chaifetz Arena (1,502); St. Louis, MO
February 12, 2025; 6:30 pm, ESPN+		Fordham	L 58−61	8−19 (2−12)	15 – Macktoon	6 – Quinn	7 – Daleba	John Glaser Arena (148); Philadelphia, PA
February 15, 2025; 12:00 pm, ESPN+		at Rhode Island	L 54−77	8−20 (2−13)	15 – Macktoon	5 – Daleba	2 – Tied	Ryan Center (1,248); Kingston, RI
February 22, 2025; 2:00 pm, ESPN+		St. Bonaventure	L 41−48	8−21 (2−14)	14 – Bowers	7 – Macktoon	4 – Magassa	John Glaser Arena (287); Philadelphia, PA
February 26, 2025; 7:00 pm, ESPN+		at Fordham	L 51−72	8−22 (2−15)	9 – Magassa	7 – Tied	5 – Quinn	Rose Hill Gymnasium (307); Bronx, NY
March 1, 2025; 2:00 pm, ESPN+		VCU	W 61−60	9−22 (3−15)	18 – Macktoon	9 – Macktoon	4 – Macktoon	John Glaser Arena (355); Philadelphia, PA
A-10 tournament
March 5, 2025; 5:00 pm, ESPN+	(14)	vs. (11) VCU; First round	W 50–48	10–22	12 – Quinn	6 – Tied	4 – Connor	Henrico Sports & Events Center (1,986); Henrico, VA
March 6, 2025; 7:30 pm, ESPN+	(14)	vs. (6) Dayton; Second round	L 45–60	10–23	14 – Daleba	8 – Armendariz	3 – Connor	Henrico Sports & Events Center (1,254); Henrico, VA
*Non-conference game. ^{#}Rankings from AP Poll. (#) Tournament seedings in parentheses. All times are in Eastern.
