= 2024–25 Davidson Wildcats women's basketball team =

American college basketball season

2024–25 Davidson Wildcats women's basketball

WBIT, First round
- Conference: Atlantic 10 Conference
- Record: 19–14 (13–5 A-10)
- Head coach: Gayle Fulks (8th season)
- Associate head coach: James Janssen
- Assistant coaches: Jasmine Jenkins; Laura Barry; Ryan Bauder
- Home arena: John M. Belk Arena

2024–25 Atlantic 10 women's basketball standings
| | Conf. | | | | Overall |
| Team | W | | L | PCT | W | | L | PCT |
|---|---|---|---|---|---|---|---|---|
| Richmond | 17 | – | 1 | .944 | 28 | – | 7 | .800 |
| George Mason † | 14 | – | 4 | .778 | 27 | – | 6 | .818 |
| Davidson | 13 | – | 5 | .722 | 19 | – | 14 | .576 |
| Saint Joseph's | 12 | – | 6 | .667 | 24 | – | 10 | .706 |
| Rhode Island | 11 | – | 7 | .611 | 17 | – | 16 | .515 |
| Dayton | 11 | – | 7 | .611 | 18 | – | 13 | .581 |
| UMass | 11 | – | 7 | .611 | 17 | – | 15 | .531 |
| Fordham | 9 | – | 9 | .500 | 15 | – | 15 | .500 |
| Duquesne | 9 | – | 9 | .500 | 21 | – | 13 | .618 |
| Saint Louis | 7 | – | 11 | .389 | 15 | – | 19 | .441 |
| VCU | 6 | – | 12 | .333 | 12 | – | 19 | .387 |
| George Washington | 5 | – | 13 | .278 | 13 | – | 18 | .419 |
| Loyola Chicago | 5 | – | 13 | .278 | 13 | – | 17 | .433 |
| La Salle | 3 | – | 15 | .167 | 10 | – | 23 | .303 |
| St. Bonaventure | 2 | – | 16 | .111 | 6 | – | 24 | .200 |
† 2025 A10 tournament winner

The 2024–25 Davidson Wildcats women's basketball team represented Davidson College during the 2024–25 NCAA Division I women's basketball season. The Wildcats, led by eighth-year head coach Gayle Fulks, played their home games at the John M. Belk Arena in Davidson, North Carolina as members of the Atlantic 10 Conference (A-10).

== Previous season ==
The Wildcats finished the 2023–24 season 18–8, 8–10 in A-10 play, to finish in a three-way tie for eighth place. The Wildcats were forced to cancel the remainder of their season on March 1, due to a "significant number of injuries".

== Roster ==
2024–25 Davidson Wildcats women's basketball team
Players
Coaches

| Pos. | # | Name | Height | Year | Previous school | Hometown |
|---|---|---|---|---|---|---|
| F | 0 | Eliza Buerk | 6 ft 3 in (1.91 m) | So | Clackamas High School | Portland, OR |
| G | 1 | Mallorie Haines | 5 ft 10 in (1.78 m) | Sr | Davidson Day School | Sherrills Ford, NC |
| G | 3 | Jasmine Timmerson | 5 ft 7 in (1.7 m) | So | Pittsburgh | Wexford, PA |
| G | 4 | Issy Morgan | 5 ft 10 in (1.78 m) | Sr | Monte Sant'Angelo Mercy College | Sydney, Australia |
| G | 7 | Katie Donovan | 5 ft 11 in (1.8 m) | So | Southport State High School | Queensland, Australia |
| F | 10 | Millie Prior | 6 ft 2 in (1.88 m) | Sr | Lake Ginninderra College | Sydney, Australia |
| F | 11 | Tomisin Adenupe | 6 ft 1 in (1.85 m) | Sr | George Walton High School | Marietta, GA |
| G | 13 | Sienna Dauer | 5 ft 11 in (1.8 m) | Fr | IMG Academy | Bradenton, FL |
| G | 14 | Kyra Bruyndoncx | 5 ft 11 in (1.8 m) | Fr | Topsportschool Antwerpen | Mol, Belgium |
| F | 17 | Candice Lienafa | 5 ft 11 in (1.8 m) | Fr | Champlain College Saint-Lambert | Quebec City, QC |
| G | 21 | Charlise Dunn | 6 ft 2 in (1.88 m) | Jr | Lake Ginninderra College | Victoria Point, Australia |
| G | 22 | Sylvie Jackson | 6 ft 0 in (1.83 m) | So | Louisa County High School | Zion Crossroads, VA |
| C | 26 | Edina Strausz | 6 ft 3 in (1.91 m) | Fr | Winston-Salem Christian School | Budapest, Hungary |
| G | 33 | Stephanie Gutierrez-Rodriguez | 5 ft 6 in (1.68 m) | Fr | Coleville High School | Tahoe City, CA |
| G | 44 | Emilie Bessell | 5 ft 9 in (1.75 m) | Fr | Redlands College | Sydney, Australia |

Head coach

- Gayle Fulks (Fairleigh Dickinson)

Assistant coach(es)

- James Janssen (Deakin)
- Jasmine Jenkins (Vanderbilt)
- Laura Barry (North Carolina)
- Ryan Bauder (Wake Forest)

Legend

- (C) Team captain
- (S) Suspended
- (I) Ineligible
- (W) Walk-on
- Injured
- Current redshirt

Roster
Last update: December 31, 2024

== Schedule and results ==
| Date time, TV | Rank^{#} | Opponent^{#} | Result | Record | High points | High rebounds | High assists | Site (attendance) city, state |
Exhibition
| October 28, 2024*; 7:00 p.m. | | Wingate | W 68–44 | – | – | – | – | John M. Belk Arena; Davidson, NC |
Non-conference regular season
| November 5, 2024*; 7:00 p.m., ESPN+ | | Florida Gulf Coast | W 57–56 | 1–0 | 18 – Prior | 8 – Donovan | 4 – Morgan | John M. Belk Arena (811); Davidson, NC |
| November 10, 2024*; 2:00 p.m., ESPN+ | | at High Point | L 53–56 | 1–1 | 13 – Lienafa | 15 – Prior | 4 – Prior | Qubein Center (789); High Point, NC |
| November 13, 2024*; 6:30 p.m., ESPN+ | | at Cincinnati | L 50–68 | 1–2 | 18 – Lienafa | 6 – 2 tied | 4 – Dauer | Fifth Third Arena (822); Cincinnati, OH |
| November 16, 2024*; 8:00 p.m., ESPN+ | | Wofford | W 74–63 | 2–2 | 23 – Morgan | 13 – Donovan | 5 – Morgan | John M. Belk Arena (792); Davidson, NC |
| November 23, 2024*; 1:00 p.m., ACCNX/ESPN+ | | at Wake Forest | L 55–60 | 2–3 | 11 – 2 tied | 4 – Haines | 6 – Morgan | LJVM Coliseum (859); Winston-Salem, NC |
| November 24, 2024*; 6:00 p.m., ESPN+ | | Presbyterian | W 81–39 | 3–3 | 13 – Lienafa | 6 – Haines | 3 – Dauer | John M. Belk Arena; Davidson, NC |
| November 29, 2024*; 4:30 p.m., WSN | | vs. Virginia Tech; Fort Myers Tip-Off Shell semifinals | L 50–79 | 3–4 | 12 – Lienafa | 5 – Donovan | 2 – 2 tied | Suncoast Credit Union Arena (540); Fort Myers, FL |
| November 30, 2024*; 5:00 p.m., WSN | | vs. Belmont; Fort Myers Tip-Off Shell consolation | L 59–69 | 3–5 | 16 – Dunn | 8 – Dunn | 1 – tied | Suncoast Credit Union Arena (573); Fort Myers, FL |
| December 5, 2024*; 11:00 a.m., ESPN+ | | at Ball State | L 61–80 | 3–6 | 19 – Donovan | 6 – Donovan | 3 – 2 tied | Worthen Arena (5,049); Muncie, IN |
| December 11, 2024*; 7:00 p.m., ACCN | | at No. 22т NC State | L 57–59 | 3–7 | 20 – Morgan | 9 – 2 tied | 3 – Prior | Reynolds Coliseum (4,789); Raleigh, NC |
| December 18, 2024*; 11:00 a.m., ESPN+ | | UNC Pembroke | W 84–53 | 4–7 | 16 – Morgan | 6 – Haines | 2 – 2 tied | John M. Belk Arena (3,471); Davidson, NC |
| December 21, 2024*; 12:00 p.m., ESPN+/FDSN | | Charlotte | W 82–55 | 5–7 | 24 – Donovan | 5 – 2 tied | 3 – 2 tied | John M. Belk Arena (712); Davidson, NC |
A-10 regular season
| December 29, 2024; 12:00 p.m., ESPN+ | | at Duquesne | W 76–70 | 6–7 (1–0) | 25 – Donovan | 16 – Dunn | 5 – Prior | UPMC Cooper Fieldhouse (1,067); Pittsburgh, PA |
| January 2, 2025; 7:00 p.m., ESPN+ | | La Salle | W 78–61 | 7–7 (2–0) | 17 – Bruyndoncx | 8 – Lienafa | 4 – Donovan | John M. Belk Arena (679); Davidson, NC |
| January 5, 2025; 12:00 p.m., CBSSN | | at Saint Louis | W 94–53 | 8–7 (3–0) | 20 – Morgan | 7 – Lienafa | 4 – Morgan | Chaifetz Arena (126); St. Louis, MO |
| January 8, 2025; 7:00 p.m., ESPN+ | | Rhode Island | W 65–55 | 9–7 (4–0) | 19 – Morgan | 9 – Prior | 3 – Bessell | John M. Belk Arena (806); Davidson, NC |
| January 12, 2025; 3:00 p.m., ESPNU | | Richmond | L 41–63 | 9–8 (4–1) | 9 – Morgan | 6 – Donovan | 2 – Prior | John M. Belk Arena (896); Davidson, NC |
| January 18, 2025; 1:00 p.m., ESPN+ | | at St. Bonaventure | W 83–45 | 10–8 (5–1) | 17 – Dunn | 10 – Prior | 4 – Prior | Reilly Center (145); St. Bonaventure, NY |
| January 22, 2025; 7:00 p.m., ESPN+ | | at George Mason | L 73–81 | 10–9 (5–2) | 32 – Dunn | 6 – 2 tied | 3 – 2 tied | EagleBank Arena (901); Fairfax, VA |
| January 26, 2025; 11:00 a.m., CBSSN | | Saint Louis | L 51–60 | 10–10 (5–3) | 16 – Donovan | 10 – Dunn | 3 – Bruyndoncx | John M. Belk Arena (831); Davidson, NC |
| January 29, 2025; 7:00 p.m., ESPN+ | | Saint Joseph's | L 46–60 | 10–11 (5–4) | 14 – Adenup | 8 – Bruyndoncx | 1 – 5 tied | John M. Belk Arena (685); Davidson, NC |
| February 2, 2025; 12:00 p.m., CBSSN | | at VCU | W 54–51 | 11–11 (6–4) | 12 – Donovan | 7 – Dunn | 4 – Bruyndoncx | Siegel Center (714); Richmond, VA |
| February 5, 2025; 7:00 p.m., ESPN+ | | Loyola Chicago | W 68–51 | 12–11 (7–4) | 13 – Bruyndoncx | 8 – Dunn | 5 – Dunn | John M. Belk Arena (647); Davidson, NC |
| February 8, 2025; 1:00 p.m., ESPN+ | | at UMass | W 56–38 | 13–11 (8–4) | 15 – 2 tied | 8 – Donovan | 8 – Prior | Mullins Center (1,472); Amherst, MA |
| February 12, 2025; 11:00 a.m., ESPN+ | | at Dayton | W 61–51 | 14–11 (9–4) | 23 – Dunn | 12 – Prior | 3 – 2 tied | UD Arena (12,152); Dayton, OH |
| February 16, 2025; 1:00 p.m., ESPN+ | | St. Bonaventure | W 55–37 | 15–11 (10–4) | 16 – Donovan | 6 – Donovan | 3 – Bruyndoncx | John M. Belk Arena (1,047); Davidson, NC |
| February 20, 2025; 8:00 p.m., Peacock | | George Mason | W 66–50 | 16–11 (11–4) | 18 – Morgan | 7 – 2 tied | 4 – 2 tied | John M. Belk Arena (698); Davidson, NC |
| February 23, 2025; 12:00 p.m., ESPN+ | | at George Washington | W 73–54 | 17–11 (12–4) | 25 – Dunn | 9 – Prior | 3 – Bruyndoncx | Charles E. Smith Center (602); Washington, D.C. |
| February 26, 2025; 6:00 p.m., ESPN+ | | at Richmond | L 46–59 | 17–12 (12–5) | 19 – Adenupe | 8 – 2 tied | 1 – 6 tied | Robins Center (1,522); Richmond, VA |
| March 1, 2025; 1:00 p.m., ESPN+ | | Fordham | W 64–52 | 18–12 (13–5) | 24 – Donovan | 9 – Dunn | 5 – Dunn | John M. Belk Arena (1,094); Davidson, NC |
A-10 tournament
| March 7, 2025; 7:30 p.m., Peacock | (3) | vs. (6) Dayton; Quarterfinals | W 56–36 | 19–12 | 16 – Dunn | 8 – Dunn | 3 – Prior | Henrico Sports & Events Center (1,622); Henrico, VA |
| March 8, 2025; 1:30 p.m., CBSSN | (3) | vs. (2) George Mason; Semifinals | L 50–63 | 19–13 | 16 – Donovan | 7 – Prior | 5 – Prior | Henrico Sports & Events Center (2,611); Henrico, VA |
WBIT
| March 20, 2025*; 7:00 p.m., ESPN+ | | at (1) James Madison; First round | L 50–77 | 19–14 | 11 – Morgan | 8 – Dunn | 6 – Dunn | Atlantic Union Bank Center (985); Harrisonburg, VA |
*Non-conference game. ^{#}Rankings from AP poll. (#) Tournament seedings in parentheses. All times are in Eastern.
