= 2024–25 Rhode Island Rams women's basketball team =

American college basketball season

2024–25 Rhode Island Rams women's basketball
- Conference: Atlantic 10 Conference
- Record: 17–16 (11–7 A-10)
- Head coach: Tammi Reiss (6th season)
- Associate head coach: Adeniyi Amadou; Ali Jaques
- Assistant coach: Jen Fay
- Home arena: Ryan Center

2024–25 Atlantic 10 women's basketball standings
	Conf.				Overall
Team	W		L	PCT	W		L	PCT
Richmond	17	–	1	.944	28	–	7	.800
George Mason †	14	–	4	.778	27	–	6	.818
Davidson	13	–	5	.722	19	–	14	.576
Saint Joseph's	12	–	6	.667	24	–	10	.706
Rhode Island	11	–	7	.611	17	–	16	.515
Dayton	11	–	7	.611	18	–	13	.581
UMass	11	–	7	.611	17	–	15	.531
Fordham	9	–	9	.500	15	–	15	.500
Duquesne	9	–	9	.500	21	–	13	.618
Saint Louis	7	–	11	.389	15	–	19	.441
VCU	6	–	12	.333	12	–	19	.387
George Washington	5	–	13	.278	13	–	18	.419
Loyola Chicago	5	–	13	.278	13	–	17	.433
La Salle	3	–	15	.167	10	–	23	.303
St. Bonaventure	2	–	16	.111	6	–	24	.200
† 2025 A10 tournament winner

The 2024–25 Rhode Island Rams women's basketball team represented the University of Rhode Island during the 2024–25 NCAA Division I women's basketball season. The Rams, led by sixth-year head coach Tammi Reiss, played their home games at the Ryan Center in Kingston, Rhode Island as members of the Atlantic 10 Conference.

== Previous season ==
The Rams finished the 2023–24 season 21–14, 10–8 in A-10 play to finish in sixth place. They defeated Dayton, Saint Joseph's, and Saint Louis, before falling to Richmond in the A-10 tournament championship game.

== Roster ==
2024–25 Rhode Island Rams women's basketball team
Players
Coaches

Pos.	#	Name	Height	Year	Previous school	Hometown
G	0	Chantelle Blagrove	5 ft 9 in (1.75 m)	RS So	Niagara Prep	Ajax, Ontario
G	1	Sophie Phillips	6 ft 0 in (1.83 m)	Sr	Cambridge Central School	Greenwich, New York
G	2	Katie Ledden	6 ft 0 in (1.83 m)	So	Rutgers Prep	Clark, New Jersey
G	3	Ayanna Franks	5 ft 9 in (1.75 m)	Fr	Windsor High School	Windsor, Connecticut
F	5	Palmire Mbu	6 ft 1 in (1.85 m)	Fr	Lycée Hector Berlioz Vincennes	Villeneuve-d'Ascq, France
F	11	Hawa Komara	6 ft 0 in (1.83 m)	RS Jr	Alain Fournier School	Toulouse, France
C	12	Albina Syla	6 ft 5 in (1.96 m)	Fr	Mäkelänrinteen Lukio	Vantaa, Finland
F	13	Anaelle Dutat	6 ft 0 in (1.83 m)	Jr	Lycée Victor Hugo	Cesson, France
G	15	Sophia Vital	5 ft 5 in (1.65 m)	So	Tabor Academy	Chelsea, Massachusetts
F	19	Mary-Kate Tshibuabua	6 ft 1 in (1.85 m)	Fr	École Acadomia	Ternay, France
C	23	Harsimran "Honey" Kaur	6 ft 4 in (1.93 m)	Sr	San Diego	Punjab, India
G	30	Ines Debroise	5 ft 9 in (1.75 m)	Jr	INSEP	Paris, France
G	45	Cia Eklöf	5 ft 10 in (1.78 m)	RS So	Washington State	Helsinki, Finland

Head coach

- Tammi Reiss (Virginia)

Assistant coach(es)

- Adeniyi Amadou (Indiana (PA))
- Ali Jaques (NYU)
- Jen Fay (Quinnipiac)

Legend

- (C) Team captain
- (S) Suspended
- (I) Ineligible
- (W) Walk-on
- Injured
- Current redshirt

Roster
Last update: December 31, 2024

== Schedule and results ==
Date time, TV	Rank^{#}	Opponent^{#}	Result	Record	High points	High rebounds	High assists	Site (attendance) city, state
Non-conference regular season
November 4, 2024*; 5:30 pm, ESPN+		Stonehill	W 68–45	1–0	19 – Kaur	13 – Komara	7 – Debroise	Ryan Center (3,810); Kingston, RI
November 8, 2024*; 7:00 pm, ESPN+		at Albany	L 57–67	1–1	13 – Dutat	8 – Komara	2 – Tied	Broadview Center (1,838); Albany, NY
November 10, 2024*; 12:00 pm, NEC Front Row		at Le Moyne	W 76–51	2–1	13 – Dutat	8 – Dutat	7 – Debroise	Ted Grant Court (351); DeWitt, NY
November 13, 2024*; 6:35 pm, ESPN+		Maine	L 53–57	2–2	11 – Kaur	8 – Komara	6 – Debroise	Ryan Center (962); Kingston, RI
November 17, 2024*; 2:00 pm, ESPN+		St. John's	L 45–60	2–3	10 – Debroise	17 – Dutat	4 – Mbu	Ryan Center (1,115); Kingston, RI
November 20, 2024*; 6:00 pm, ESPN+		at UMass Lowell	W 81–35	3–3	14 – Phillips	13 – Dutat	5 – Tied	Costello Athletic Center (267); Lowell, MA
November 23, 2024*; 1:00 pm, ESPN+		Brown	W 63–58	4–3	16 – Phillips	13 – Mbu	4 – Vital	Ryan Center (1,059); Kingston, RI
November 28, 2024*; 6:30 pm, FloHoops		vs. No. 22 Iowa; Cancún Challenge Riviera Division	L 62–69	4–4	21 – Kaur	6 – Dutat	5 – Vital	Hard Rock Hotel Riviera Maya (514); Cancún, Mexico
November 29, 2024*; 4:00 pm, FloHoops		vs. Idaho State; Cancún Challenge Riviera Division	L 50–52	4–5	10 – Kaur	8 – Dutat	4 – Debroise	Hard Rock Hotel Riviera Maya (200); Cancún, Mexico
December 4, 2024*; 6:35 pm, ESPN+		Providence	L 45–48	4–6	9 – Kaur	10 – Tied	5 – Vital	Ryan Center (1,075); Kingston, RI
December 7, 2024*; 2:00 pm, ESPN+		at Harvard	L 48–60	4–7	17 – Phillips	11 – Kaur	6 – Vital	Lavietes Pavilion (687); Cambridge, MA
December 11, 2024*; 7:00 pm, ESPN+		at Princeton	L 54–66	4–8	13 – Komara	8 – Komara	2 – Tied	Jadwin Gymnasium (742); Princeton, NJ
December 20, 2024*; 11:00 am, ESPN+		Saint Francis	W 77–37	5–8	21 – Kaur	11 – Kaur	8 – Vital	Ryan Center (5,922); Kingston, RI
A-10 regular season
December 29, 2024; 1:00 pm, ESPN+		Saint Louis	W 83–63	6–8 (1–0)	27 – Kaur	10 – Kaur	14 – Vital	Ryan Center (1,162); Kingston, RI
January 2, 2025; 1:00 pm, ESPN+		at St. Bonaventure	W 82–48	7–8 (2–0)	19 – Kaur	15 – Kaur	4 – Kaur	Reilly Center (189); St. Bonaventure, NY
January 8, 2025; 7:00 pm, ESPN+		at Davidson	L 55−65	7−9 (2−1)	13 – Debroise	11 – Komara	3 – Debroise	John M. Belk Arena (806); Davidson, NC
January 12, 2025; 12:00 pm, CBSSN		George Mason	L 65−71	7−10 (2−2)	17 – Kaur	14 – Kaur	6 – Vital	Ryan Center (1,723); Kingston, RI
January 15, 2025; 6:00 pm, ESPN+		at VCU	W 64−50	8−10 (3−2)	17 – Kaur	9 – Kaur	4 – Debroise	Siegel Center (472); Richmond, VA
January 19, 2025; 12:00 pm, CBSSN		at Duquesne	L 64−77	8−11 (3−3)	19 – Debroise	11 – Dutat	5 – Debroise	UPMC Cooper Fieldhouse (903); Pittsburgh, PA
January 22, 2025; 6:35 pm, ESPN+		UMass	W 60−58	9−11 (4−3)	20 – Phillips	12 – Tied	5 – Tied	Ryan Center (1,045); Kingston, RI
January 26, 2025; 1:00 pm, ESPN+		Loyola Chicago	W 67−49	10−11 (5−3)	17 – Phillips	15 – Kaur	4 – Tied	Ryan Center (1,635); Kingston, RI
January 29, 2025; 6:30 pm, ESPN+		at Fordham	W 53−35	11−11 (6−3)	15 – Vital	12 – Komara	4 – Vital	Rose Hill Gymnasium (226); Bronx, NY
February 2, 2025; 2:00 pm, ESPN+		at Richmond	L 56−79	11−12 (6−4)	14 – Kaur	7 – Kaur	5 – Vital	Robins Center (2,496); Richmond, VA
February 5, 2025; 6:35 pm, ESPN+		Duquesne	W 59−57	12−12 (7−4)	20 – Vital	12 – Komara	5 – Vital	Ryan Center (1,046); Kingston, RI
February 8, 2025; 1:00 pm, ESPN+		Dayton	W 57−36	13−12 (8−4)	18 – Phillips	8 – Dutat	5 – Phillips	Ryan Center (1,169); Kingston, RI
February 12, 2025; 7:00 pm, ESPN+		at George Mason	L 44−56	13−13 (8−5)	16 – Vital	10 – Dutat	4 – Vital	EagleBank Arena (1,027); Fairfax, VA
February 15, 2025; 12:00 pm, ESPN+		La Salle	W 77−54	14−13 (9−5)	23 – Kaur	9 – Tied	4 – Vital	Ryan Center (1,248); Kingston, RI
February 19, 2025; 6:35 pm, ESPN+		Saint Joseph's	W 70−65	15−13 (10−5)	19 – Kaur	7 – Dutat	6 – Vital	Ryan Center (1,600); Kingston, RI
February 23, 2025; 1:00 pm, ESPN+		at UMass	W 42−40	16−13 (11−5)	12 – Phillips	12 – Dutat	4 – Debroise	Mullins Center (1,410); Amherst, MA
February 26, 2025; 8:00 pm, ESPN+		at Saint Louis	L 63−67	16−14 (11−6)	14 – Dutat	10 – Dutat	5 – Vital	Chaifetz Arena (913); St. Louis, MO
March 1, 2025; 1:00 pm, ESPN+		George Washington	L 46−54	16−15 (11−7)	17 – Dutat	12 – Dutat	5 – Vital	Ryan Center (1,444); Kingston, RI
A-10 tournament
March 6, 2025; 1:30 pm, ESPN+	(5)	vs. (12) George Washington; Second round	W 52–41	17–15	12 – Kaur	11 – Kaur	3 – Debroise	Henrico Sports & Events Center (1,972); Henrico, VA
March 7, 2025; 1:30 pm, Peacock	(5)	vs. (4) Saint Joesph's; Quarterfinals	L 50–53 ^{OT}	17–16	13 – Dutat	7 – Kaur	3 – Debroise	Henrico Sports & Events Center; Henrico, VA
*Non-conference game. ^{#}Rankings from AP Poll. (#) Tournament seedings in parentheses. All times are in Eastern.
