= 2025 Atlantic 10 women's basketball tournament =

American college basketball postseason tournament

- Classification: Division I
- Season: 2024–25
- Site: Henrico Sports & Events Center; Henrico, Virginia
- Champions: George Mason (1st title)
- Winning coach: Vanessa Blair-Lewis (1st title)
- MVP: Zahirah Walton (George Mason)
- Television: ESPN+, ESPN2, Peacock, CBSSN

2024–25 Atlantic 10 women's basketball standings
	Conf.				Overall
Team	W		L	PCT	W		L	PCT
Richmond	17	–	1	.944	28	–	7	.800
George Mason †	14	–	4	.778	27	–	6	.818
Davidson	13	–	5	.722	19	–	14	.576
Saint Joseph's	12	–	6	.667	24	–	10	.706
Rhode Island	11	–	7	.611	17	–	16	.515
Dayton	11	–	7	.611	18	–	13	.581
UMass	11	–	7	.611	17	–	15	.531
Fordham	9	–	9	.500	15	–	15	.500
Duquesne	9	–	9	.500	21	–	13	.618
Saint Louis	7	–	11	.389	15	–	19	.441
VCU	6	–	12	.333	12	–	19	.387
George Washington	5	–	13	.278	13	–	18	.419
Loyola Chicago	5	–	13	.278	13	–	17	.433
La Salle	3	–	15	.167	10	–	23	.303
St. Bonaventure	2	–	16	.111	6	–	24	.200
† 2025 A10 tournament winner

The 2025 Atlantic 10 women's basketball tournament will be the postseason women's basketball tournament for the 2024–25 season of the Atlantic 10 Conference (A-10). It was held from March 5–9, 2025, in Henrico, Virginia, at the Henrico Sports & Events Center. It will be the 42nd annual edition of the tournament.

== Seeds ==
All 15 A-10 schools participated in the tournament. Teams were seeded by winning percentage within the conference, with a tiebreaker system to seed teams with identical percentages. The top nine teams received a first-round bye, and the top four teams received a double-bye, automatically advancing them to the quarterfinals.

Seed	School	Conference Record	Tiebreaker
1	Richmond	17–1	
2	George Mason	14–4	
3	Davidson	13–5	
4	Saint Joseph's	12–6	
5	Rhode Island	11–7	3–0 vs. Dayton/Massachusetts
6	Dayton	11–7	1–1 vs. Rhode Island/Massachusetts; 1–0 vs. Massachusetts
7	Massachusetts	11–7	0–3 vs. Rhode Island/Dayton; 0–1 vs. Dayton
8	Fordham	9–9	2–0 vs. Duquesne
9	Duquesne	9–9	0–2 vs. Fordham
10	Saint Louis	7–11	
11	VCU	6–12	
12	George Washington	5–13	1–3 vs. Rhode Island/Dayton/Massachusetts
13	Loyola Chicago	5–13	0–4 vs. Rhode Island/Dayton/Massachusetts
14	La Salle	3–15	
15	St. Bonaventure	2–16	

== Schedule ==
Session	Game	Time	Matchup	Score	Television	Attendance
First round – Wednesday, March 5
1	1	noon	No. 12 George Washington vs No. 13 Loyola Chicago	65–44	ESPN+	1,986
1	2	2:30 pm	No. 10 Saint Louis vs No. 15 St. Bonaventure	60–50	ESPN+	1,986
1	3	5:00 pm	No. 11 VCU vs No. 14 La Salle	48–50	ESPN+	1,986
Second round – Thursday, March 6
2	4	11:00 am	No. 8 Fordham vs No. 9 Duquesne	63–79	ESPN+	1,972
2	5	1:30 pm	No. 5 Rhode Island vs No. 12 George Washington	52-41	ESPN+	1,972
3	6	5:00 pm	No. 7 Massachusetts vs No. 10 Saint Louis	57–67	ESPN+	1,254
3	7	7:30 pm	No. 6 Dayton vs No. 14 La Salle	60-45	ESPN+	1,254
Quarterfinals – Friday, March 7
4	8	11:00 am	No. 1 Richmond vs No. 9 Duquesne	63–58	Peacock	
4	9	1:30 pm	No. 4 Saint Joseph's vs No. 5 Rhode Island	53–50^{OT}	Peacock	
5	10	5:00 pm	No. 2 George Mason vs No. 10 Saint Louis	87–57	Peacock	1,622
5	11	7:30 pm	No. 3 Davidson vs No. 6 Dayton	56–36	Peacock	1,622
Semifinals – Saturday, March 8
6	12	11:00 am	No. 1 Richmond vs No. 4 Saint Joseph's	49–50	CBSSN	2,611
6	13	1:30 pm	No. 2 George Mason vs No. 3 Davidson	63–50	CBSSN	2,611
Championship – Sunday, March 9
7	14	4:00 pm	No. 4 Saint Joseph's vs No. 2 George Mason	58–73	ESPN2	2,718
Game times in EST through the semifinals and EDT for the championship. Rankings denote tournament seed.

== Bracket ==
First round Wednesday, March 5 ESPN+
12	George Washington	65
13	Loyola Chicago	44
10	Saint Louis	60
15	St. Bonaventure	50
11	VCU	48
14	La Salle	50

Second round Thursday, March 6 ESPN+
8	Fordham	63
9	Duquesne	79
5	Rhode Island	52
12	George Washington	41
7	Massachusetts	57
10	Saint Louis	67
6	Dayton	60
14	La Salle	45

Quarterfinals; Friday, March 7 Peacock
1	Richmond	63
9	Duquesne	58
4	Saint Joseph’s	53*
5	Rhode Island	50
2	George Mason	87
10	Saint Louis	57
3	Davidson	56
6	Dayton	36

Semifinals; Saturday, March 8 CBSSN
1	Richmond	49
4	Saint Joseph's	50
2	George Mason	63
3	Davidson	50

Championship; Sunday, March 9 ESPN2
4	Saint Joseph's	58
2	George Mason	73

* denotes overtime period
