= Revolutionary Rivalry =

American college basketball rivalry

- George Mason Patriots George Washington Revolutionaries
- Sport: Multi-sport

Statistics
- All-time series: GWU leads 5–1–1

Locations of George Mason and George Washington

The Revolutionary Rivalry is a rivalry between the George Mason Patriots and George Washington Revolutionaries, both of which play in the Atlantic 10 Conference and are located in the Washington metropolitan area. Both schools are named after founding fathers, George Mason and George Washington, who were both natives to Virginia and had their plantations, Gunston Hall and Mount Vernon, respectively, on the southside of modern Fairfax County, Virginia.

The rivalry is balanced in terms of total wins between each school across all sports. George Washington, though, has historically dominated the series in men's and women's basketball, while George Mason has dominated the series in baseball and men's and women's soccer.

== History ==
The formal rivalry, with the title, "Revolutionary Rivalry" is rooted ahead of the 2013–14 academic school year, when George Mason University left the Colonial Athletic Association to join the Atlantic 10 Conference, as part of the 2010–2014 NCAA conference realignment. Before then, both institutions regularly played non-conference matches against each other due to relative proximity of the schools (separated by 20 miles).

Historically, most of the rivalry, even prior to the Patriots joining the A-10, was fixed on basketball, which has historically favored the Revolutionaries. However, with both schools being part of the Atlantic 10, the rivalry was formally given a title, and spanned across all sports.

== All-time series summary ==
Sport	All-time series record	Last result	Next meeting	Source
Baseball	Mason leads 74–50	Mason won 13–10 on April 7, 2024	2025 @ GW	
Men's Basketball	GW leads 25–15	GW won 72–53 on February 13, 2026	TBD	
Women's Basketball	GW leads 30–19	Mason won 67–52 on February 21, 2026	TBD	
Men's Cross Country	0–0	0–0	0–0	
Women's Cross Country	0–0	0–0	0–0	
Golf	0–0	0–0	0–0	
Women's Lacrosse	Mason leads 16–4	Mason won 13–8 on March 30, 2024	2025 @ GW	
Women's Rowing	0–0	0–0	0–0	
Men's Soccer	Mason leads 28–17–4	Mason won 5–2 on September 28, 2024	2025 @ GW	
Women's Soccer	Mason leads 24–3–6	1–1 draw on September 29, 2024	2025 @ Mason	
Softball	GW leads 25–19	GW won 2–1 on April 16, 2024	2025 @ Mason	
Men's Swimming	0–0	0–0	0–0	
Women's Swimming	0–0	0–0	0–0	
Men's Tennis	0–0	0–0	0–0	
Women's Tennis	0–0	0–0	0–0	
Volleyball	GW leads 49–15	GW won 3–0 on October 30, 2024	2025	

Series led and games won by George Mason are shaded ██ green. Series led and games won by George Washington are shaded ██ blue.

== Series results ==
The formal rivalry began during the 2013–14 season when Mason joined the Atlantic 10 Conference.

The point system is that there is one point awarded per win, and split half a point if it ends in a tie in head-to-head team sports. This includes soccer, volleyball, basketball, tennis and lacrosse. In baseball and softball, a point is awarded to whichever team wins the series, since these sports are played in three-game series over the course of the regular season. In individual, non head-to-head sports, a point is awarded to the team that finishes higher in the Atlantic 10 championship. These sports are cross country, swimming, golf and rowing.

== See also ==
- George Mason University
- George Washington University
