= Henrico Sports & Events Center =

County-owned indoor arena

- Henrico Sports & Events Center during the A10 Womens Basketball Tournament in 2026
- Full name: Henrico Sports & Events Center
- Address: 1 All Star Boulevard, Glen Allen, VA 23059; Glen Allen, Virginia
- Capacity: 3,500 (sporting events)
- Record attendance: 3,556 (2024 Atlantic 10 women's basketball tournament session 4, March 8, 2024)

Construction
- Groundbreaking: 2020
- Opened: 2023
- Cost: $50 million

Tenant
- Atlantic 10 women's basketball tournament (2024–)

Website
- https://www.henricocenter.com/

The Henrico Sports & Events Center is an indoor arena in Henrico, Virginia. The center court has a seating capacity of 3,500 for sporting events.

The complex, which room for 12 basketball courts or 24 volleyball courts, opened in 2023.

The arena hosted the 2024 Atlantic 10 women's basketball tournament, where it saw a total attendance of 14,559 across five days. It also hosted the 2025 and 2026 tournaments.

In 2025 the A10 agreed to a multi-year extension with the Henrico Sports & Entertainment Authority keeping the Atlantic 10 Women's Basketball Tournament in Richmond, VA till 2029.
