= Henrico, Virginia =

Area in Virginia, United States

Henrico is the name used by the U.S. Postal Service for several ZIP code areas in unincorporated parts of Henrico County, Virginia, United States, surrounding the city of Richmond. "Other acceptable cities" listed by the USPS for parts of Henrico are Richmond, Highland Springs, Regency, and Ridge, whereas Millers, Montrose, Montrose Heights, Staples Mill, Tuckahoe, Varina, and Westbury are alternate names for portions of Henrico that are not recommended for use in mailing addresses.

Henrico is identified in the National Register of Historic Places's NRIS database as being the location of, or nearest community to, the Curles Neck Farm.
