= 2020–21 Michigan Tech Huskies men's basketball team =

American college basketball season

2020–21 Michigan Tech Huskies men's basketball

NCAA tournament, Sweet 16
- Conference: Great Lakes Intercollegiate Athletic Conference
- Record: 15–8 (12–6 GLIAC)
- Head coach: Kevin Luke (27th season)
- Associate head coach: Josh Buettner (14th season)
- Assistant coach: Rae Drake (3rd season)
- Home arena: Sherman Stadium

2020–21 Great Lakes Intercollegiate Athletic Conference men's basketball standings
	Conf.				Overall
Team	W		L	PCT	W		L	PCT
Wayne St. (Mich)	12	–	5	.706	12	–	7	.632
Grand Valley St	11	–	6	.647	12	–	7	.632
Michigan Tech	12	–	6	.667	15	–	8	.652
Ferris St.	8	–	8	.500	9	–	11	.450
Ashland	11	–	7	.611	15	–	9	.625
Purdue Northwest	8	–	8	.500	8	–	9	.471
Parkside	9	–	10	.474	9	–	10	.474
Lake Superior St.	8	–	10	.444	8	–	11	.421
Northwood	6	–	12	.333	6	–	12	.333
Saginaw Valley St.	4	–	11	.267	5	–	12	.294
† 2021 GLIAC tournament winner Rankings from ??? Poll

The 2020–21 Michigan Tech Huskies men's basketball team represented Michigan Tech in the 2020–21 NCAA Division II men's basketball season. The Huskies were led by 27th-year head coach Kevin Luke and played their home games at Sherman Stadium in Houghton, Michigan as members of the Great Lakes Intercollegiate Athletic Conference.

== Previous season ==
=== Regular season ===
The Huskies finished 20–8, 14–6 in the GLIAC, in the 2020–21 season prior to the start of the GLIAC tournament

=== Postseason ===
Despite the NCAA Tournament getting cancelled for all teams, from DI through DIII, the Huskies were able to participate in the GLIAC tournament and won all three games that they participated in.

Their opponents in the Tournament were Saginaw Valley, Grand Valley State, and Northwood

The Huskies were number three in the GLIAC, when the season ended, pairing them with 6-seed Saginaw Valley

== Offseason ==
=== Coaching changes ===
On December 21, 2020, Josh Buettner was promoted to the Associate head coach position for the Michigan Tech men's basketball program.

=== Departures ===
Three players for the Michigan Tech that were on the 2019-20 roster for the Huskies weren't on the 2020-21 roster, including Senior Ryan Schuller who graduated from the university. The former of the pair of articles doesn't state directly that Schuller graduated, but appears as though he did given the phrases expressed in the article.

Name	Number	Pos.	Height	Weight	Year	Hometown	Notes
Elisha Coleman	2	G	6'2"	177	So	Minneapolis, MN	Removed from Roster
Tommy Lucca	3	G	6'0"	180	Jr	Kingston, Ill.	Removed from roster
Ryan Schuller	40	F	6'10"	255	Sr	Sturgis, MI	Graduated

== Preseason ==
=== Preseason rankings ===
The Huskies weren't ranked in the Preseason Top 25

=== COVID-19 ===
Due to the COVID-19 pandemic, all sports related to the GLIAC, have been postponed to January 1, 2021. This comes after a unanimous decision by the Great Lakes Intercollegiate Athletic Conference Council of Presidents and Chancellors on August 12, 2020.

== Roster ==
2020–21 Michigan Tech Huskies men's basketball team
Players
Coaches

Pos.	#	Name	Height	Weight	Year	Previous school	Hometown
G	3	Adam Hobson	6 ft 4 in (1.93 m)	190 lb (86 kg)	Fr	Stoughton High School	Stoughton, WI
G	4	Jason Waterman	6 ft 0 in (1.83 m)	180 lb (82 kg)	Fr	Negaunee High School	Negaunee, MI
G	5	Isaac Appleby	6 ft 2 in (1.88 m)	190 lb (86 kg)	Sr	Eau Claire Memorial	Eau Claire, WI
G	10	Matt Ojala	6 ft 1 in (1.85 m)	175 lb (79 kg)	RS Fr	Calumet HS	Mohawk, MI
G	11	Jalen Carter	5 ft 10 in (1.78 m)	175 lb (79 kg)	Jr	Lindblom HS	Chicago, Ill
F	12	Kyle Clow	6 ft 5 in (1.96 m)	200 lb (91 kg)	Jr	Germantown HS	Germantown, WI
G	14	Dawson Bilski	6 ft 3 in (1.91 m)	190 lb (86 kg)	Sr	Powers North Central HS	Powers, MI
G	15	Carter Johnston	6 ft 3 in (1.91 m)	185 lb (84 kg)	Jr	Beaverton HS	Beaverton, MI
G	20	Devin Schmitz	5 ft 11 in (1.8 m)	160 lb (73 kg)	So	Dollar Bay HS	Dollar Bay, MI
G	21	Eric Carl	6 ft 5 in (1.96 m)	190 lb (86 kg)	So	Kaukauna HS	Kaukauna, WI
G	21	Owen White	6 ft 6 in (1.98 m)	215 lb (98 kg)	Jr	Rhinelander HS	Rhinelander, WI
G	24	Logan Geissler	6 ft 1 in (1.85 m)	175 lb (79 kg)	Fr	Bay Port HS	Green Bay, WI
F	30	Brad Simonsen	6 ft 6 in (1.98 m)	210 lb (95 kg)	Fr	Houghton HS	Houghton, MI
F	32	Trent Bell	6 ft 7 in (2.01 m)	220 lb (100 kg)	Jr	Negaunee HS	Negaunee, MI
G/F	34	Pete Calcaterra	6 ft 6 in (1.98 m)	190 lb (86 kg)	Fr	Boyne City HS	Boyne City, MI
F	42	TeeAaron Powell	6 ft 9 in (2.06 m)	240 lb (109 kg)	Jr	Marian Catholic HS	South Holland, Ill
C	44	Tyler Robarge	6 ft 8 in (2.03 m)	230 lb (104 kg)	So	Chippewa Falls HS	Chippewa Falls, WI

Head coach

- Kevin Luke (Northern Michigan)

Assistant coach(es)

- Josh Buettner (Michigan Tech)
- Rae Drake Jr (Michigan Tech)

Legend

- (C) Team captain
- (S) Suspended
- (I) Ineligible
- (W) Walk-on
- Injured
- Current redshirt

Roster

== Schedule and results ==
On Thursday, November 12, 2020, the GLIAC announced the games that would be played throughout the regular season for each of the participating members of the conference. Michigan Tech and Northern Michigan are travel partners for this season, meaning they don't play their games back-to-back, unlike the rest of their games. This goes for the rest of the conference as well. After ending the season with a 3-game win streak (1 against Grand Valley State and Parkside), the Huskies got a 3-seed in the GLIAC Tournament, meaning they would go against six-seed Purdue Northwest, who they went against the first weekend in the regular season. They beat Purdue Northwest and Grand Valley State to make the GLIAC Championship Game. In the Championship, Michigan Tech went up against 5-seed Ashland, who won the matchup 85–77. On March 6 or 7, The DII 48-team bracket was released, and Michigan Tech was placed as a 2-seed, giving them a one-game bye. The Huskies' first game of the bracket will be played on Sunday, March 14, 2021, against three-seed Southern Indiana, following their win over fifth-seed Lewis on Saturday, March 13. Following the Huskies' win over 3-seed Southern Indiana, and 1-seed Truman's win over 5-seed Ashland, Truman beat Michigan Tech 65–62. The Huskies were outscored 26–16 in the first half, and outscored Truman 44–37 in the second half.

Date time, TV	Rank^{#}	Opponent^{#}	Result	Record	High points	High rebounds	High assists	Site (attendance) city, state
GLIAC regular season
January 9, 2021; 1:00 pm		Purdue Northwest	W 68-59	1-0 (1-0)	24 – Biliski	5 – Tied	8 – Bell	Sherman Stadium (0); Houghton, Michigan
January 10, 2021; 1:00 pm		Purdue Northwest	L 52-76	1-1 (1-1)	14 – Carl	11 – Bell	4 – Tied	Sherman Stadium (0); Houghton, Michigan
January 15, 2021; 6:00 pm		at Northwood	W 62-49	2-1 (2-1)	26 – White	8 – Bell	5 – Johnston	Riepma Arena (0); Midland, Michigan
January 16, 2021; 3:00 pm		at Northwood	W 68-63	3-1 (3-1)	23 – White	11 – White	6 – White	Riepma Arena (0); Midland, Michigan
January 22, 2021; 3:00 pm		at Lake Superior State	W 79-74	4-1 (4-1)	29 – White	10 – Bell	7 – Johnston	Bud Cooper Gymnasium (0); Sault Ste. Marie, MI
January 23, 2021; 1:00 pm		at Lake Superior State	W 83-70	5-1 (5-1)	17 – Tied	8 – Bell	7 – Johnston	Bud Cooper Gymnasium (0); Sault Ste. Marie, MI
January 26, 2021; 7:30 pm		at Northern Michigan	W 61-52	6-1 (6-1)	18 – White	8 – Bell	2 – Tied	Superior Dome (0); Marquette, MI
January 29, 2021; 5:00 pm		Ferris State	L 57-60	6-2 (6-2)	24 – Bilski	10 – Tied	5 – Johnston	Sherman Stadium (0); Houghton, Michigan
January 30, 2021; 3:00 pm		Ferris State	L 54-56	6-3 (6-3)	17 – Bell	8 – White	3 – Johnston	Sherman Stadium (0); Houghton, Michigan
February 5, 2021; 3:00 pm		Saginaw Valley State	W 76-57	7-3 (7-3)	24 – Carl	11 – Bell	5 – Johnston	Sherman Stadium (0); Houghton, Michigan
February 6, 2021; 2:00 pm		Saginaw Valley State	W 65-62	8-3 (8-3)	18 – White	10 – White	6 – Johnston	Sherman Stadium (0); Houghton, Michigan
February 12, 2021; 5:00 pm		at Davenport	L 58-73	8-4 (8-4)	22 – White	7 – Johnston	9 – Johnston	Main Arena (50); Midland, MI
February 13, 2021; 1:00 pm		at Davenport	L 70-77	8-5 (8-5)	20 – White	9 – Bell	10 – Johnston	Main Arena (50); Midland, MI
February 16, 2021; 5:30 pm		Northern Michigan	W 73-51	9-5 (9-5)	22 – White	6 – White	10 – Johnston	Sherman Stadium (0); Houghton, Michigan
February 20, 2021; 1:00 pm		Grand Valley State	L 62-70	9-6 (9-6)	20 – White	10 – Bell	10 – Tied	Sherman Stadium (0); Houghton, Michigan
February 21, 2021; 1:00 pm		Grand Valley State	W 75-62	10-6 (10-6)	30 – White	9 – White	8 – Johnston	Sherman Stadium (0); Houghton, Michigan
February 26, 2021; 4:00 pm, TBA		Parkside	W 70-65	11-6 (11-6)	21 – White	7 – White	6 – Johnston	Sherman Stadium (0); Houghton, MI
February 27, 2021; 2:00 pm		Parkside	W 69-47	12-6 (12-6)	20 – White	7 – Bell	4 – Bell	Sherman Stadium (0); Houghton, MI
GLIAC tournament
March 4, 2021; 9:45 pm	(3)	(6) Purdue Northwest; GLIAC Quarterfinals	W 74-63	13-6	26 – Bilski	13 – Bell	5 – Johnston	Sherman Stadium (0); Houghton, Michigan
March 5, 2021; 8:30 pm	(3)	vs. (2) Grand Valley St; GLIAC Semi-Finals	W 65-59	14-6	17 – Tied	11 – Bell	7 – Johnston	John Friend Court (0); Hammond, Indiana
March 7, 2021; 8:30 pm	(3)	vs. (5) Ashland; GLIAC Championship	L 77-85	14-7	33 – White	11 – Bell	5 – Johnston	John Friend Court (0); Hammond, Indiana
NCAA DII Men's Tournament 2021
March 14, 2021; 9:30 pm	(2)	vs. (3) Southern Indiana; Second Round	W 81-69	15-7	24 – White	10 – Bell	7 – Johnston	Ford Center (785); Evansville, Indiana
March 16, 2021; 8:00 pm	(2)	vs. (1) Truman; Midwest Regional Championship	L 62-65	15-8	19 – White	7 – Bell	4 – Tied	Ford Center (286); Evansville, Indiana
*Non-conference game. ^{#}Rankings from d2sida. (#) Tournament seedings in parentheses. All times are in Eastern Time.

== Player statistics ==
Individual player statistics (through January 7, 2021)
			Minutes		Scoring		Total FGs			3-point FGs			Free-Throws			Rebounds							
Player	GP	GS	Tot	Avg	Pts	Avg	FG	FGA	Pct	3FG	3FA	Pct	FT	FTA	Pct	Off	Def	Tot	Avg	A	Stl	Blk	TO
Hobson, Adam	1	0	23	23	5	5	1	5	.200	1	3	.333	2	4	.500	1	2	3	3	2	1	0	?
Waterman, Jason	0	0	0	0	0	0	0	0	.000	0	0	.000	0	0	.000	0	0	0	0	0	0	0	0
Appleby, Isaac	1	1	19	19.0	5	5	1	3	.333	1	3	.333	2	4	.500	0	5	5	5	0	1	0	?
Team																							
Total	11		2200		858	78.0	310	686	.452	90	255	.353	.148	193	.767	122	340	432	39.3	218	54	52	150
Opponents	11		2200		807	72.8	28	0659	.425	81	23.1	.351	160	215	.744	92	269	361	32.8	154	81	28	126

Legend
GP	Games played	GS	Games started	Avg	Average per game
FG	Field-goals made	FGA	Field-goal attempts	Off	Offensive rebounds
Def	Defensive rebounds	A	Assists	TO	Turnovers
Blk	Blocks	Stl	Steals

== Rankings ==
The Huskies' ranks are taken from the D2SIDA Poll, and the Coaches Poll from NABC Coaches

Ranking movements Legend: ██ Increase in ranking ██ Decrease in ranking — = Not ranked RV = Received votes
	Week									
Poll	Pre	1	2	3	4	5	6	7	8	Final
D2SIDA	—	—	—	—	—	—	—	—	—	RV
Coaches	—									

== Awards and honors ==
=== Regular season awards ===
==== Owen White ====
- GLIAC North Player of the Week

=== Post-season awards ===
==== Owen White ====
- Third Team Academic All-American
- Academic All-District
