= Robyn Fralick =

American basketball coach (born 1982)

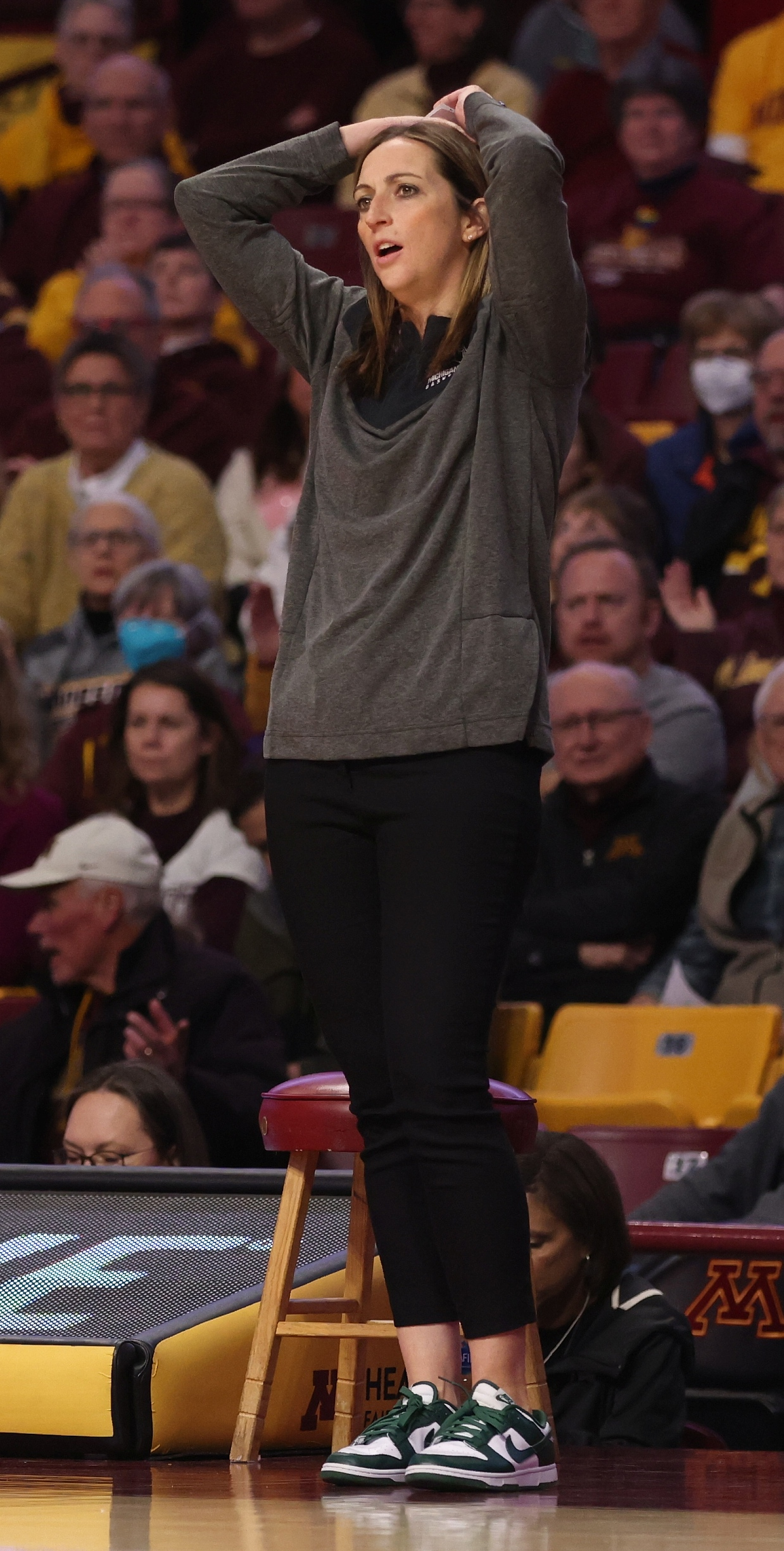
- Fralick in 2024

Current position
- Title: Head coach
- Team: Michigan State
- Conference: Big Ten
- Record: 67–28 (.705)

Biographical details
- Born: January 29, 1982 (age 44); Okemos, Michigan, U.S.

Playing career
- 2000–2004: Davidson

Coaching career (HC unless noted)
- 2004–2005: Appalachian State (asst.)
- 2007–2008: Toledo (asst.)
- 2008–2015: Ashland (asst.)
- 2015–2018: Ashland
- 2018–2023: Bowling Green
- 2023–present: Michigan State

Administrative career (AD unless noted)
- 2005–2007: Western Michigan (Dir. of Operations)

Head coaching record
- Overall: 259–104 (.713)
- Tournaments: NCAA Division II: 12–2 (.857) NCAA Division I: 2–3 (.400); MAC Tournament: 6–6 (.500); Big Ten Tournament: 0–2 (.000); WNIT: 5–3 (.625) WBI: 2–1 (.667)

Accomplishments and honors

Championships
- NCAA Division II National Championship (2017) 3× GLIAC tournament championship (2016–2018); 3× GLIAC Regular Season Championship (2016–2018); 3× GLIAC South Division Championship (2016–2018) MAC Regular Season Championship (2021)

Awards
- C. Vivian Stringer Coaching Award (2018) WBCA Coach of the Year (2017, 2018); 3× GLIAC Coach of the Year (2016, 2017, 2018); NCAA Division II Basketball Bulletin Coach of the Year (2017); Columbus Dispatch Coach of the Year (2016, 2017) MAC Coach of the Year (2021)

Robyn Fralick (born January 29, 1982) is an American women's basketball coach who is the current head coach at Michigan State University. She previously coached at Ashland and Bowling Green universities and was director of operations at Western Michigan.

== Davidson statistics ==
Legend
GP	Games played	GS	Games started	MPG	Minutes per game
FG%	Field goal percentage	3P%	3-point field goal percentage	FT%	Free throw percentage
RPG	Rebounds per game	APG	Assists per game	SPG	Steals per game
BPG	Blocks per game	PPG	Points per game	**Bold**	Career high

Year	Team	GP	Points	FG%	3P%	FT%	RPG	APG	SPG	BPG	PPG
2000–01	Davidson	28	143	32.4%	18.8%	75.4%	3.5	1.8	0.8	0.2	5.1
2001–02	Davidson	28	169	37.3%	**40.7%**	**76.9%**	4.1	**3.7**	1.4	0.3	6.0
2002–03	Davidson	**30**	**232**	**38.6%**	22.2%	75.9%	**4.1**	3.3	**1.5**	**0.6**	**7.7**
2003–04	Davidson	28	132	32.0%	27.6%	74.4%	2.9	2.2	1.2	0.2	4.7
Career		114	676	35.7%	27.4%	75.5%	3.7	2.7	1.2	0.3	5.9

== Coaching career ==
=== Ashland ===
At Ashland, Fralick was 104–3 overall as a head coach, winning the 2017 NCAA Division II National Championship and reaching the title game the following year, as well.

=== Bowling Green ===
On April 3, 2018, Fralick was named head coach of the Bowling Green Women's Basketball program.

After a first 2 years working to rebuild the Falcon program, Fralick led the Falcons to their first MAC Championship Game appearance since 2011, losing a hotly contested battle in Cleveland with Central Michigan, 77–72. For her efforts, Fralick was named the MAC Coach of the Year for the 2020–21 season.

In 2022–23, Fralick's Falcons finished 31–7, winning 9 games against opponents with 20+ wins on the year throughout the season. In the postseason, BGSU advanced to the first WNIT Fab 4 in school history, defeating Liberty, Green Bay, Memphis, and Florida along the way before falling in the semifinals.

=== Michigan State ===
On March 31, 2023, Fralick was hired as the next head coach of the Michigan State women's basketball program, returning her to Mid-Michigan, where she grew up.

== Personal life ==
Fralick is married to her husband Tim, they have a son, William, and a daughter, Clara. Tim served as a volunteer assistant coach during her three years at Ashland.

== Head coaching record ==
=== NCAA Division II ===
Record table
Season	Team	Overall	Conference	Standing	Postseason
**Ashland Eagles** (Great Lakes Intercollegiate Athletic Conference) (2015–2018)
2015–16	Ashland	31–2	21–1	1st (South)	NCAA Division II Elite Eight
2016–17	Ashland	37–0	20–0	1st (South)	NCAA Division II National Champions
2017–18	Ashland	36–1	20–0	1st (South)	NCAA Division II Runner-Up
Ashland:		104–3 (.972)	61–1 (.984)		
Total:		104–3 (.972)			
National champion Postseason invitational champion Conference regular season champion Conference regular season and conference tournament champion Division regular season champion Division regular season and conference tournament champion Conference tournament champion

=== NCAA Division I ===
Through March 22, 2026

Record table
Season	Team	Overall	Conference	Standing	Postseason
**Bowling Green Falcons** (Mid-American Conference) (2018–2023)
2018–19	Bowling Green	9–21	2–16	6th (East)	
2019–20	Bowling Green	10–21	3–15	6th (East)	
2020–21	Bowling Green	21–8	14–4	1st	WNIT Second Round
2021–22	Bowling Green	17–16	10–10	6th	WBI Semifinals
2022–23	Bowling Green	31–7	14–4	T-2nd	WNIT Semifinals
Bowling Green:		88–73 (.547)	43–49 (.467)		
**Michigan State Spartans** (Big Ten Conference) (2023–Present)
2023–24	Michigan State	22–9	12–6	4th	NCAA Division I First Round
2024–25	Michigan State	22–10	11–7	T–5th	NCAA Division I Second Round
2025–26	Michigan State	23–9	11–7	T–6th	NCAA Division I Second Round
Michigan State:		67–28 (.705)	34–20 (.630)		
Total:		155–101 (.605)			
National champion Postseason invitational champion Conference regular season champion Conference regular season and conference tournament champion Division regular season champion Division regular season and conference tournament champion Conference tournament champion
