= 2025–26 Mercyhurst Lakers women's basketball team =

American college basketball season

2025–26 Mercyhurst Lakers women's basketball

WNIT, Round 1
- Conference: Northeast Conference
- Record: 15–17 (14–4 NEC)
- Head coach: Erin Mills-Reid (1st season)
- Assistant coaches: Kelly Simmons; Amber Renz
- Home arena: Owen McCormick Court

2025–26 Northeast Conference women's basketball standings
	Conf.				Overall
Team	W		L	PCT	W		L	PCT
Fairleigh Dickinson †	18	–	0	1.000	30	–	5	.857
Mercyhurst*	14	–	4	.778	15	–	17	.469
LIU	14	–	4	.778	21	–	11	.656
Wagner	9	–	9	.500	13	–	17	.433
Le Moyne*	9	–	9	.500	12	–	21	.364
Chicago State	8	–	10	.444	9	–	23	.281
Stonehill	8	–	10	.444	12	–	18	.400
New Haven**	5	–	13	.278	7	–	22	.241
Saint Francis	3	–	15	.167	3	–	27	.100
Central Connecticut	2	–	16	.111	2	–	27	.069
† 2026 NEC tournament winner * ineligible for the 2026 NCAA tournament due to transition from Division II ** ineligible for both the 2026 NEC tournament and the 2026 NCAA tournament due to transition from Division II

The 2025–26 Mercyhurst Lakers women's basketball team represented Mercyhurst University during the 2025–26 NCAA Division I women's basketball season. The Lakers, led by first year head coach Erin Mills-Reid, played their home games on Owen McCormick Court in the Mercyhurst Athletic Center in Erie, Pennsylvania as second-year members of the Northeast Conference (NEC).

This season was Mercyhurst's second year of a four-year transition period from Division II to Division I. As a result, the Lakers are not eligible to participate in the NCAA tournament until the 2028–29 season.

== Previous season ==
The Lakers finished the 2024–25 season 9–18 and 6–10 in NEC play, to finish in a three-way tie for fifth place. As first-year members of Division I, they were ineligible for the NEC tournament.

On March 10, 2025, following the conclusion of the season, the school announced the firing of head coach Brooklyn Kohlheim after 6 seasons with the program in which she posted a 69–88 record. On April 9, the school announced the hiring of former Lakers assistant coach Erin Mills-Reid, who was previously with the team during the 2006–07 season while they still competed in Division II.

== Offseason ==
=== Departures ===
Mercyhurst Departures
Name	Num	Pos.	Height	Year	Hometown	Reason for Departure
Singo Lekeuneu	1	G	5'5"	Senior	Buffalo, NY	Graduated
Allyson Ross	3	G	5'5"	Senior	Columbia Station, OH	Graduated
Maria McConnell	13	G	5'11"	Senior	Nanty Glo, PA	Graduated
Ava Waid	15	G	5'6"	Senior	Meadville, PA	Graduated
Grace Strickland	20	G	5'9"	Freshman	London, England	Transferred to Mid-America Christian (NAIA)
Grace Clary	22	G	5'10"	Graduate Student	Whitehall, PA	Graduated
Bailey Kuhns	34	F	5'11"	Junior	Mount Pleasant, PA	Transferred to Robert Morris

=== Incoming transfers ===
Mercyhurst Incoming Transfers
Name	Num	Pos.	Height	Year	Hometown	Previous school
Lena Walz	2	G	5'10"	Sophomore	Erie, PA	St. Bonaventure
Gabby Sweeney	13	G/F	6'1"	RS Freshman	East Fishkill, NY	Bryant

=== Recruiting class ===
There was no recruiting class for the class of 2025.

== Roster ==
2025–26 Mercyhurst Lakers women's basketball team
Players
Coaches

Pos.	#	Name	Height	Year	Previous school	Hometown
G	0	Sophia Kelly	5 ft 9 in (1.75 m)	Jr	Hampton High School	Pittsburgh, PA
G	2	Lena Walz	5 ft 10 in (1.78 m)	So	Cathedral Preparatory School; St. Bonaventure	Erie, PA
G	3	Julia Lewis	5 ft 8 in (1.73 m)	Fr	Cherry Hill High School West	Cherry Hill, NJ
G	4	Shannon Heine	5 ft 8 in (1.73 m)	Fr	Manasquan High School	Spring Lake Heights, NJ
G	5	Jenna Van Schaik	5 ft 7 in (1.7 m)	Sr	Ursuline Academy	Cincinnati, OH
F	6	Imani Frazier	5 ft 11 in (1.8 m)	Fr	Wayne High School	Huber Heights, OH
G	10	Cici Hernandez	5 ft 6 in (1.68 m)	So	Bethlehem Catholic High School	Bethlehem, PA
G	11	Alena Fusetti	5 ft 9 in (1.75 m)	So	Blackhawk High School	Beaver Falls, PA
G	12	Emma Sollenne	5 ft 8 in (1.73 m)	Fr	St. Luke's School	Greenwich, CT
G/F	13	Gabby Sweeney	6 ft 1 in (1.85 m)	RS Fr	John Jay High School; Bryant	East Fishkill, NY
G	20	Sofia Wilson	5 ft 7 in (1.7 m)	Fr	Magnificat High School	Avon Lake, OH
F	23	Lauryn Stover	5 ft 11 in (1.8 m)	Sr	Gilmour Academy; Purdue Fort Wayne	Gates Mills, OH
G	24	Quinn Borroni	5 ft 9 in (1.75 m)	RS So	Blackhawk High School	Beaver Falls, PA
F	32	Erica Hall	5 ft 11 in (1.8 m)	So	South Fayette High School	McDonald, PA
G	33	Ella Cupka	5 ft 9 in (1.75 m)	RS Fr	Chartiers Valley High School	Pittsburgh, PA

Head coach

- Erin Mills-Reid (Fairleigh Dickinson)

Assistant coach(es)

- Kelly Simmons (Trinity)
- Amber Renz (Mercyhurst)

Legend

- (C) Team captain
- (S) Suspended
- (I) Ineligible
- (W) Walk-on
- Injured
- Current redshirt

Roster

== Schedule and results ==
Date time, TV	Rank^{#}	Opponent^{#}	Result	Record	High points	High rebounds	High assists	Site (attendance) city, state
Non-conference regular season
November 4, 2025*; 6:30 p.m., B1G+		at No. 23 Michigan State	L 39–125	0–1	9 – Tied	5 – Wilson	2 – Tied	Breslin Center (2,804); East Lansing, MI
November 6, 2025*; 7:00 p.m., ESPN+		at Dayton	L 44–86	0–2	15 – Walz	5 – Sweeney	3 – Tied	UD Arena (2,088); Dayton, OH
November 14, 2025*; 6:00 p.m., NEC Front Row		Cornell	L 49–53	0–3	15 – Walz	5 – Sweeney	3 – Tied	Owen McCormick Court (227); Erie, PA
November 20, 2025*; 6:00 p.m., NEC Front Row		Youngstown State	L 50–64	0–4	16 – Walz	5 – Fusetti	5 – Van Schaik	Owen McCormick Court (332); Erie, PA
November 23, 2025*; 2:00 p.m., ESPN+		at No. 12 Iowa State	L 62–112	0–5	17 – Van Schaik	4 – Van Schaik	3 – Tied	Hilton Coliseum (9,581); Ames, IA
November 30, 2025*; 1:00 p.m., ESPN+		at Canisius	L 67–75	0–6	20 – Hernandez	7 – Walz	4 – Wilson	Koessler Athletic Center (424); Buffalo, NY
December 3, 2025*; 11:00 a.m., NEC Front Row		Robert Morris	L 71–73	0–7	23 – Van Schaik	6 – Hall	3 – Van Schaik	Owen McCormick Court (578); Erie, PA
December 5, 2025*; 7:00 p.m., ESPN+		at No. 25 West Virginia	L 51–97	0–8	14 – Wilson	5 – Hall	5 – Van Schaik	Hope Coliseum (2,816); Morgantown, WV
December 12, 2025*; 6:00 p.m., NEC Front Row		St. Bonaventure	L 57–60	0–9	23 – Wilson	9 – Heine	4 – Van Schaik	Owen McCormick Court (301); Erie, PA
December 15, 2025*; 7:00 p.m., ESPN+		at Mount St. Mary's	L 52–81	0–10	26 – Hall	9 – Hall	5 – Wilson	Knott Arena (471); Emmitsburg, MD
December 19, 2025*; 10:30 a.m., ACCNX		at Syracuse	L 40–106	0–11	14 – Hall	11 – Tied	4 – Tied	JMA Wireless Dome (10,226); Syracuse, NY
NEC regular season
January 2, 2026; 5:00 p.m., NEC Front Row		Fairleigh Dickinson	L 46–68	0–12 (0–1)	17 – Wilson	5 – Hall	2 – Wilson	Owen McCormick Court (234); Erie, PA
January 4, 2026; 1:00 p.m., NEC Front Row		at Le Moyne	W 89–72	1–12 (1–1)	19 – Wilson	7 – Tied	5 – Tied	Ted Grant Court (192); Syracuse, NY
January 8, 2026; 6:00 p.m., NEC Front Row		LIU	L 81–86	1–13 (1–2)	25 – Hernandez	5 – Walz	5 – Wilson	Owen McCormick Court (176); Erie, PA
January 10, 2026; 1:00 p.m., NEC Front Row		Wagner	W 69–66	2–13 (2–2)	22 – Walz	6 – Hall	4 – Hernandez	Owen McCormick Court (176); Erie, PA
January 15, 2026; 7:00 p.m., NEC Front Row		at Central Connecticut	W 80–63	3–13 (3–2)	22 – Van Schaik	6 – Walz	5 – Tied	Detrick Gymnasium (287); New Britain, CT
January 17, 2026; 1:00 p.m., NEC Front Row		at Stonehill	W 63–58	4–13 (4–2)	24 – Hernandez	6 – Walz	4 – Van Schaik	Merkert Gymnasium (205); Easton, MA
January 22, 2026; 6:00 p.m., NEC Front Row		New Haven	W 66–63	5–13 (5–2)	25 – Van Schaik	5 – Wilson	4 – Tied	Owen McCormick Court (263); Erie, PA
January 24, 2026; 2:00 p.m., NEC Front Row		at Chicago State	W 77–76	6–13 (6–2)	22 – Wilson	6 – Fusetti	8 – Wilson	Jones Convocation Center (74); Chicago, IL
January 29, 2026; 6:00 p.m., NEC Front Row		at New Haven	W 81–75 ^{OT}	7–13 (7–2)	21 – Hernandez	8 – Walz	7 – Wilson	The Hazell Center (311); West Haven, CT
January 31, 2026; 1:00 p.m., NEC Front Row		Chicago State	L 64–68	7–14 (7–3)	17 – Wilson	4 – Hall	5 – Tied	Owen McCormick Court (234); Erie, PA
February 5, 2026; 7:00 p.m., NEC Front Row		Saint Francis	W 79–59	8–14 (8–3)	23 – Van Schaik	7 – Van Schaik	6 – Van Schaik	DeGol Arena (473); Loretto, PA
February 7, 2026; 1:00 p.m., NEC Front Row		at Fairleigh Dickinson	L 64–84	8–15 (8–4)	20 – Tied	6 – Van Schaik	6 – Van Schaik	Bogota Savings Bank Center (309); Hackensack, NJ
February 14, 2026; 1:00 p.m., NEC Front Row		Saint Francis; Play4Kay	W 85–61	9–15 (9–4)	26 – Walz	8 – Walz	7 – Van Schaik	Owen McCormick Court (269); Erie, PA
February 19, 2026; 7:00 p.m., ESPN+		at Wagner	W 73–67	10–15 (10–4)	29 – Van Schaik	10 – Wilson	5 – Wilson	Spiro Sports Center (449); Staten Island, NY
February 21, 2026; 2:00 p.m., NEC Front Row		at LIU	W 58–55	11–15 (11–4)	17 – Tied	6 – Tied	4 – Hernandez	Steinberg Wellness Center (213); Brooklyn, NY
February 26, 2026; 12:00 p.m., NEC Front Row		Central Connecticut	W 75–66	12–15 (12–4)	21 – Tied	7 – Walz	6 – Wilson	Owen McCormick Court (312); Erie, PA
February 28, 2026; 1:00 p.m., NEC Front Row		Stonehill; Senior Day	W 68–55	13–15 (13–4)	24 – Hernandez	6 – Tied	5 – Wilson	Owen McCormick Court (463); Erie, PA
March 5, 2026; 6:00 p.m., NEC Front Row		Le Moyne	W 72–66	14–15 (14–4)	19 – Hernandez	7 – Wilson	4 – Van Schaik	Owen McCormick Court (437); Erie, PA
NEC tournament
March 9, 2026; 6:00 p.m., NEC Front Row	(2)	(7) Stonehill; Quarterfinals	W 70–64	15–15	23 – Van Schaik	6 – Hall	5 – Van Schaik	Owen McCormick Court (409); Erie, PA
March 12, 2026; 7:00 p.m., ESPN+	(2)	(3) LIU; Semifinals	L 64–82	15–16	28 – Van Schaik	8 – Tied	2 – Tied	Owen McCormick Court (463); Erie, PA
WNIT
March 19, 2026; 6:00 p.m., ESPN+		Binghamton; Round 1	L 60–81	15–17	17 – Wilson	8 – Hall	4 – Van Schaik	Owen McCormick Court (433); Erie, PA
*Non-conference game. ^{#}Rankings from AP Poll. (#) Tournament seedings in parentheses. All times are in Eastern.
