= GLIAC men's basketball tournament =

Great Lakes Intercollegiate Athletic Conference men's basketball tournament
- Conference basketball championship
- Sport: Basketball
- Conference: Great Lakes Intercollegiate Athletic Conference
- Number of teams: 8
- Format: Single-elimination tournament
- Played: 1991–present
- Current champion: Grand Valley State (7th)
- Most championships: Findlay (8)
- Official website: GLIAC men's basketball

Host stadiums
- Pre-Determined Campus Arenas (2003–present); DeltaPlex Arena (2000–2002); Pre-Determined Campus Arenas (1991–present)

Host locations
- Pre-Determined Campus Sites (2003–present); Grand Rapids, MI (2000–2002); Pre-Determined Campus Sites (1991–present)

The Great Lakes Intercollegiate Athletic Conference (GLIAC) men's basketball tournament is the annual conference basketball championship tournament for the Great Lakes Intercollegiate Athletic Conference. The tournament has been held annually since 1991. It is a single-elimination tournament and seeding is based on regular season records.

The winner receives the GLIAC's automatic bid to the NCAA Men's Division II Basketball Championship.

== Results ==
Year	Champions	Score	Runner-up	Venue
1991	Grand Valley State	93–84	Ferris State	Allendale, MI
1992	Not held			
1993	Wayne State	93–86	Northern Michigan	Marquette, MI
1994	Wayne State	83–67	Northern Michigan	Detroit, MI
1995	Hillsdale	89–80	Oakland	Big Rapids, MI
1996	Lake Superior State	106–102	Oakland	Rochester, MI
1997	Grand Valley State	92–78	Oakland	Adrian, MI
1998	Ferris State	71–62	Michigan Tech	Houghton, MI
1999	Wayne State	67–53	Michigan Tech	Kellogg Arena (Battle Creek, MI)
2000	Northern Michigan	73–70	Michigan Tech	DeltaPlex (Grand Rapids, MI)
2001	Grand Valley State	102–92	Gannon	DeltaPlex (Grand Rapids, MI)
2002	Michigan Tech	79–65	Northwood	DeltaPlex (Grand Rapids, MI)
2003	Michigan Tech	68–66	Findlay	SDC Gymnasium (Houghton, MI)
2004	Findlay	73–68	Michigan Tech	Croy Gymnasium (Findlay, OH)
2005	Findlay	87–64	Wayne State	Croy Gymnasium (Findlay, OH)
2006	Grand Valley State	80–58	Ferris State	GVSU Fieldhouse (Allendale, MI)
2007	Findlay	71–61	Grand Valley State	Croy Gymnasium (Findlay, OH)
2008	Grand Valley State	73–67	Findlay	GVSU Fieldhouse (Allendale, MI)
2009	Findlay+	67–56	Grand Valley State	Croy Gymnasium (Findlay, OH)
2010	Findlay	79–66	Hillsdale	Croy Gymnasium (Findlay, OH)
2011	Wayne State	73–71	Ferris State	Wink Arena (Big Rapids, MI)
2012	Findlay	71–52	Hillsdale	Jesse Philips Arena (Hillsdale, MI)
2013	Findlay	75–69	Lake Superior State	SDC Gymnasium (Houghton, MI)
2014	Findlay	71–62	Michigan Tech	Croy Gymnasium (Findlay, OH)
2015	Ferris State	87–82	Lake Superior State	Bud Cooper Gymnasium (Sault Ste. Marie, MI)
2016	Ferris State	76–59	Walsh	Kates Gymnasium (Ashland, OH)
2017	Ferris State	80–79	Ashland	Wink Arena (Big Rapids, MI)
2018	Ferris State+	69–61	Lake Superior State	Wink Arena (Big Rapids, MI)
2019	Grand Valley State	80-70	Davenport	DU Student Center (Grand Rapids, MI)
2020	Michigan Tech	68-57	Northwood	GVSU Fieldhouse (Allendale, MI)
2021	Ashland	85-77	Michigan Tech	John Friend Court (Hammond, IN)
2022	Davenport	100–67	Northern Michigan	SDC Gymnasium (Houghton, MI)
2023	Northern Michigan	79-66	Michigan Tech	Wink Arena (Big Rapids, MI)
2024	Ferris State	87–76	Grand Valley State	Berry Events Center (Marquette, MI)
2025	Northern Michigan	78–63	Lake Superior State	SDC Gymnasium (Houghton, MI)
2026	Grand Valley State	67–57	Northern Michigan	Berry Events Center (Marquette, MI)

+Indicates won NCAA championship

== Championship records ==
School	Finals Record	Finals Appearances	Years
Findlay	8–2	10	2004, 2005, 2007, 2009, 2010, 2012, 2013, 2014
Grand Valley State	7–3	10	1991, 1997, 2001, 2006, 2008, 2019, 2026
Ferris State	6–3	9	1998, 2015, 2016, 2017, 2018, 2024
Wayne State	4–1	5	1993, 1994, 1999, 2011
Michigan Tech	3–7	10	2002, 2003, 2020
Northern Michigan	3–4	7	2000, 2023, 2025
Lake Superior State	1–4	5	1996
Hillsdale	1–2	3	1995
Davenport	1-1	2	2022
Ashland	1-1	2	2021
Oakland	0–3	3	
Northwood	0–2	2	
Gannon	0–1	1	
Walsh	0–1	1	

- Parkside, Purdue Northwest, Roosevelt, and Saginaw Valley State have not yet reached the finals of the GLIAC tournament.
- Lake Erie, Malone, Mercyhurst, Ohio Dominican, Tiffin, and Westminster (PA) never reached the tournament championship game before departing the GLIAC.
- Schools highlighted in pink are former members of the Great Lakes Intercollegiate Athletic Conference

== See also ==
- GLIAC women's basketball tournament
