= GLIAC women's basketball tournament =

Great Lakes Intercollegiate Athletic Conference women's basketball tournament
- Conference basketball championship
- Sport: Basketball
- Conference: Great Lakes Intercollegiate Athletic Conference
- Number of teams: 12
- Format: Single-elimination tournament
- Played: 1991–present
- Current champion: Grand Valley State (6th)
- Most championships: Northern Michigan (8); Michigan Tech (8)
- Official website: https://gliac.org/sports/wbball

Host stadiums
- Pre-Determined Campus Arenas (2003–present); DeltaPlex Arena (2000-2002); Kellogg Arena (1999); Pre-Determined Campus Arenas (1991–1999)

Host locations
- Pre-Determined Campus Sites (2003–present); Grand Rapids, MI (2000–2002); Battle Creek, MI (1999); Pre-Determined Campus Sites (1991–1999)

The Great Lakes Intercollegiate Athletic Conference (GLIAC) women's basketball tournament is the annual conference basketball championship tournament for the Great Lakes Intercollegiate Athletic Conference. The tournament has been held annually since 1991. It is a single-elimination tournament and seeding is based on regular season records.

The winner receives the GLIAC's automatic bid to the NCAA Women's Division II Basketball Championship.

== Results ==
Year	Champions	Score	Runner-up	Venue
1991	Northern Michigan	66-64	Michigan Tech	Houghton, MI
1992	Northern Michigan	61-60	Michigan Tech	Houghton, MI
1993	Michigan Tech	70-63	Saginaw Valley State	Houghton, MI
1994	Oakland	74-72	Michigan Tech	Rochester, MI
1995	Northern Michigan	74-67	Michigan Tech	Houghton, MI
1996	Northern Michigan	78-57	Michigan Tech	Rochester, MI
1997	Northern Michigan	81-71	Oakland	Marquette, MI
1998	Northern Michigan	94-74 2OT	Ashland	Marquette, MI
1999	Michigan Tech	75-71	Hillsdale	Kellogg Arena Battle Creek, MI
2000	Northern Michigan	93-80	Ferris State	DeltaPlex Arena Grand Rapids, MI
2001	Michigan Tech	84-66	Gannon	DeltaPlex Arena Grand Rapids, MI
2002	Hillsdale	63-59	Michigan Tech	DeltaPlex Arena Grand Rapids, MI
2003	Lake Superior State	67-60	Grand Valley State	Bud Cooper Gym Sault Ste. Marie, MI
2004	Lake Superior State	85-73	Ferris State	Kate's Gym Ashland, OH
2005	Grand Valley State	77-60	Gannon	GVSU Fieldhouse Allendale, MI
2006	Grand Valley State+	76-58	Ashland	GVSU FieldhouseAllendale, MI
2007	Gannon	88-77	Hillsdale	Hammermill Center Erie, PA
2008	Michigan Tech	81-53	Ashland	SDC Gym Houghton, MI
2009	Hillsdale	81-69	Michigan Tech	SDC Gym Houghton, MI
2010	Michigan Tech	73-69	Northern Michigan	SDC Gym Houghton, MI
2011	Michigan Tech	63-53	Ashland	SDC Gym Houghton, MI
2012	Ashland	66-50	Ferris State	Kate's Gym Ashland, OH
2013	Ashland+	68-49	Findlay	Kate's Gym Ashland
2014	Northern Michigan	53-49	Malone	Mattaei Center Detroit, MI
2015	Michigan Tech	68-52	Ashland	SDC Gym Houghton, MI
2016	Ashland	70-53	Grand Valley State	Kate's Gym Ashland, OH
2017	Ashland+	85-76	Grand Valley State	Kate's Gym Ashland, OH
2018	Ashland	85-74	Grand Valley State	Kate's Gym Ashland, OH
2019	Ashland	65-58	Northern Michigan	GVSU Fieldhouse Allendale, MI
2020	Ashland	61-53	Grand Valley State	Kate's Gym Ashland, OH
2021	Michigan Tech	74-63	Ashland	H.D. Kesling Gym Westville, IN
2022	Ferris State	59–51	Grand Valley State	GVSU Field House Allendale, MI
2023	Grand Valley State	62-54	Michigan Tech	GVSU Field House Allendale, MI
2024	Grand Valley State	67–48	Northern Michigan	GVSU Field House Allendale, MI
2025	Grand Valley State	79–48	Ferris State	GVSU Field House Allendale, MI
2026	Grand Valley State	83–62	Ferris State	GVSU Field House Allendale, MI

+Indicates won NCAA championship

== Championship records ==
School	Finals Record	Finals Appearances	
Michigan Tech	8–8	16	1993, 1999, 2001, 2008, 2010, 2011, 2015, 2021
Northern Michigan	8–3	11	1991, 1992, 1995, 1996, 1997, 1998, 2000, 2014
Ashland	7–6	13	2012, 2013, 2016, 2017, 2018, 2019, 2020
Grand Valley State	6–6	12	2005, 2006, 2023, 2024, 2025, 2026
Hillsdale	2–2	4	2002, 2009
Lake Superior State	2–0	2	2003, 2004
Ferris State	1–4	5	2022
Gannon	1–2	3	2007
Oakland	1–1	2	1994
Findlay	0–1	1	
Malone	0–1	1	
Saginaw Valley State	0–1	1	

Notes

- Davenport, Parkside, Purdue Northwest, Roosevelt, and Wayne State have not yet reached the finals of the GLIAC tournament.
- Lake Erie, Mercyhurst, Northwood, Ohio Dominican, Tiffin, Walsh and Westminster (PA) never reached the tournament championship game before departing the GLIAC.
- Schools highlighted in pink are former members of the Great Lakes Intercollegiate Athletic Conference.

== See also ==
- GLIAC men's basketball tournament
