= 2025–26 Le Moyne Dolphins women's basketball team =

American college basketball season

2025–26 Le Moyne Dolphins women's basketball
- Conference: Northeast Conference
- Record: 12–21 (9–9 NEC)
- Head coach: Nick DiPillo (2nd season)
- Assistant coaches: Casey Filiault; Mya Jackson; Emma Boslet
- Home arena: Le Moyne Events Center

2025–26 Northeast Conference women's basketball standings
	Conf.				Overall
Team	W		L	PCT	W		L	PCT
Fairleigh Dickinson †	18	–	0	1.000	30	–	5	.857
Mercyhurst*	14	–	4	.778	15	–	17	.469
LIU	14	–	4	.778	21	–	11	.656
Wagner	9	–	9	.500	13	–	17	.433
Le Moyne*	9	–	9	.500	12	–	21	.364
Chicago State	8	–	10	.444	9	–	23	.281
Stonehill	8	–	10	.444	12	–	18	.400
New Haven**	5	–	13	.278	7	–	22	.241
Saint Francis	3	–	15	.167	3	–	27	.100
Central Connecticut	2	–	16	.111	2	–	27	.069
† 2026 NEC tournament winner * ineligible for the 2026 NCAA tournament due to transition from Division II ** ineligible for both the 2026 NEC tournament and the 2026 NCAA tournament due to transition from Division II

The 2025–26 Le Moyne Dolphins women's basketball team represented Le Moyne College during the 2025–26 NCAA Division I women's basketball season. The Lakers, who were led by second-year head coach Nick DiPillo, played their home games on Ted Grant Court in the Le Moyne Events Center in DeWitt, New York.

This season marked Le Moyne's third and final year of a three-year transition period (Note: Though Le Moyne was originally set to be eligible for NCAA postseason play in 2027–28 following a four-year transition period, the school accelerated their transition by one year under new transition rules, making them eligible starting in 2026–27.) from Division II to Division I), which they moved up to following the 2022–23 academic year. As a result, the Dolphins are not eligible to participate in the NCAA tournament until the 2026–27 season.

== Previous season ==
The Dolphins finished the 2024–25 season 7–24 and 6–10 in NEC play, to finish in a 3-way tie for fifth place. As the No. 5 seed in the NEC tournament, they defeated No. 4 Saint Francis in the quarterfinals before losing to No. 2 Stonehill in the semifinals.

== Offseason ==
=== Departures ===
Le Moyne Departures
Name	Num	Pos.	Height	Year	Hometown	Reason for Departure
Mia Yanogacio	3	G	5'7"	Senior	Somerset, NJ	Graduated/transferred to Central Connecticut
Zhara Adeyemi	11	F	6'2"	Sophomore	Brooklyn, NY	Roberts Wesleyan (DII)
Megan Bodziony	22	G	5'10"	Graduate Student	Wakefield, RI	Graduated
Emily Florvil	23	G	5'6"	Senior	Brooklyn, NY	Graduated
Haedyn Roberts	24	F	6'1"	Graduate Student	Holland Patent, NY	Graduated
Noelle Cabiness	32	F	6'0"	Freshman	Ashburn, VA	Transferred to Christopher Newport (DIII)
Brianna Williams	44	F	6'1"	Senior	Brampton, Ontario	TBD; entered transfer portal

=== Incoming transfers ===
Le Moyne incoming transfers
Name	Num	Pos.	Height	Year	Hometown	Previous school
Sophia Bonnell	10	G	5'5"	Sophomore	Horseheads, NY	SUNY New Paltz (DIII)
Ashley Buragas	45	F	6'1"	Junior	Hopewell Junction, NY	Mineral Area College (NJCAA)

=== Recruiting class ===
There was no recruiting class for the class of 2025.

== Roster ==
2025–26 Le Moyne Dolphins women's basketball team
Players
Coaches

Pos.	#	Name	Height	Year	Previous school	Hometown
G	0	Jessica Wangolo	5 ft 7 in (1.7 m)	Jr	Capital Courts Academy; Buffalo	Ottawa, Ontario
G	1	Peyton Dincher	5 ft 10 in (1.78 m)	Fr	Jersey Shore Area High School	Jersey Shore, PA
G	2	Eli Clark	5 ft 8 in (1.73 m)	So	Ocean Township High School	Oakhurst, NJ
G	4	Sierra Linnin	5 ft 8 in (1.73 m)	Sr	Albertus Magnus High School	Valley Cottage, NY
G	5	Michelina Lombardi	5 ft 6 in (1.68 m)	Sr	Averill Park High School	Wynantskill, NY
G	10	Sophia Bonnell	5 ft 5 in (1.65 m)	So	Horseheads High School; SUNY New Paltz	Horseheads, NY
F	11	Ava Johnson	6 ft 2 in (1.88 m)	Fr	The Steward School	Richmond, VA
F	12	Sydney Postell	5 ft 10 in (1.78 m)	Jr	Churchville-Chili High School	Churchville, NY
F	13	Rachel Lynch	6 ft 3 in (1.91 m)	Fr	Putnam Science Academy	Cork, Ireland
G	21	Amya McLeod	5 ft 6 in (1.68 m)	RS So	Rome Free Academy; Youngstown State	Rome, NY
F	22	Praise Matthews	6 ft 1 in (1.85 m)	Fr	Dallastown Area High School	Red Lion, PA
G	23	Ava Lucarotti	5 ft 8 in (1.73 m)	Fr	Cathedral Preparatory School	Erie, PA
G	33	Kayden Clark	5 ft 8 in (1.73 m)	Fr	Manasquan High School	Oakhurst, NJ
F	45	Ashley Buragas	6 ft 1 in (1.85 m)	Jr	John Jay Senior High School; Mineral Area College	Hopewell Junction, NY

Head coach

- Nick DiPillo (Fairleigh Dickinson)

Assistant coach(es)

- Casey Filiault (Kean)
- Mya Jackson (Cincinnati)
- Emma Boslet (Saint Joseph's)

Legend

- (C) Team captain
- (S) Suspended
- (I) Ineligible
- (W) Walk-on
- Injured
- Current redshirt

Roster

== Schedule and results ==
Date time, TV	Rank^{#}	Opponent^{#}	Result	Record	High points	High rebounds	High assists	Site (attendance) city, state
Exhibition
October 31, 2025*; 6:00 p.m.		Rochester	W 76–60		15 – Dincher	4 – Tied	3 – Tied	Ted Grant Court (136); DeWitt, NY
Non-conference regular season
November 3, 2025*; 2:00 p.m., ESPN+		at St. John's	L 53–68	0–1	14 – K. Clark	7 – E. Clark	7 – E. Clark	Carnesecca Arena (427); Queens, NY
November 9, 2025*; 11:00 a.m., ESPN+		at Lafayette	W 82–79 ^{OT}	1–1	20 – Tied	22 – Buragas	6 – Buragas	Kirby Sports Center (363); Easton, PA
November 16, 2025*; 3:00 p.m., ESPN+		at No. 7 Baylor	L 43–99	1–2	11 – Dincher	4 – Tied	3 – E. Clark	Foster Pavilion (3,360); Waco, TX
November 18, 2025*; 6:00 p.m., ACCNX		at Pittsburgh	L 65–87	1–3	17 – Linnin	6 – Buragas	5 – Tied	Petersen Events Center (592); Pittsburgh, PA
November 22, 2025*; 4:00 p.m., NEC Front Row		Cornell	L 51–52 ^{OT}	1–4	17 – E. Clark	10 – Buragas	3 – Buragas	Ted Grant Court (414); DeWitt, NY
November 25, 2025*; 11:00 a.m., ESPN+		at Bucknell	L 41–65	1–5	14 – Dincher	7 – McLeod	3 – Lynch	Sojka Pavilion (1,550); Lewisburg, PA
November 30, 2025*; 3:00 p.m., B1G+		at Illinois	L 28–100	1–6	8 – E. Clark	5 – Linnin	2 – Tied	State Farm Center (3,994); Champaign, IL
December 6, 2025*; 1:00 p.m., NEC Front Row		St. Bonaventure	L 57–66	1–7	13 – Dincher	6 – E. Clark	4 – Wangolo	Ted Grant Court (276); DeWitt, NY
December 14, 2025*; 2:00 p.m., ESPN+		at Marquette	L 42–89	1–8	8 – Tied	4 – K. Clark	2 – Tied	Al McGuire Center (1,109); Milwaukee, WI
December 16, 2025*; 11:00 a.m., ESPN+		at Bowling Green	L 46–74	1–9	13 – Buragas	8 – Buragas	4 – K. Clark	Stroh Center (2,656); Bowling Green, OH
December 20, 2025*; 12:00 p.m., ESPN+		vs. Saint Joseph's; Hawk Classic	L 40–100	1–10	9 – E. Clark	4 – Dincher	3 – Wangolo	Michael J. Hagan '85 Arena; Philadelphia, PA
December 21, 2025*; 12:00 p.m., ESPN+		vs. Akron; Hawk Classic	L 68–94	1–11	24 – Linnin	3 – Tied	2 – Tied	Michael J. Hagan '85 Arena; Philadelphia, PA
December 30, 2025*; 3:00 p.m., NEC Front Row		SUNY Geneseo	W 67–55	2–11	16 – Buragas	7 – Buragas	4 – Tied	Ted Grant Court (167); DeWitt, NY
NEC regular season
January 2, 2026; 6:00 p.m., NEC Front Row		Saint Francis	W 73–69	3–11 (1–0)	16 – Buragas	6 – E. Clark	6 – E. Clark	Ted Grant Court (179); DeWitt, NY
January 4, 2026; 1:00 p.m., NEC Front Row		Mercyhurst	L 72–89	3–12 (1–1)	21 – Linnin	10 – Buragas	3 – Tied	Ted Grant Court (192); DeWitt, NY
January 8, 2026; 6:00 p.m., NEC Front Row		at New Haven	W 48–40	4–12 (2–1)	17 – Linnin	5 – Tied	5 – E. Clark	The Hazell Center (354); West Haven, CT
January 10, 2026; 1:00 p.m., NEC Front Row		at Central Connecticut	W 65–61	5–12 (3–1)	15 – Dincher	13 – Buragas	4 – Wangolo	Detrick Gymnasium (311); New Britain, CT
January 15, 2026; 7:00 p.m., NEC Front Row		at LIU	L 68–78	5–13 (3–2)	23 – Dincher	5 – Bonnell	5 – Wangolo	Steinberg Wellness Center (124); Brooklyn, NY
January 17, 2026; 1:00 p.m., NEC Front Row		Chicago State	L 55–61	5–14 (3–3)	23 – Buragas	8 – Tied	6 – Wangolo	Ted Grant Court (351); DeWitt, NY
January 22, 2026; 7:00 p.m., NEC Front Row		at Wagner	L 45–59	5–15 (3–4)	13 – Buragas	10 – Wangolo	3 – E. Clark	Spiro Sports Center (397); Staten Island, NY
January 24, 2026; 1:00 p.m., NEC Front Row		Fairleigh Dickinson	L 41–56	5–16 (3–5)	13 – Buragas	15 – Buragas	4 – Buragas	Ted Grant Court (216); DeWitt, NY
January 29, 2026; 6:00 p.m., NEC Front Row		LIU	L 65–84	5–17 (3–6)	24 – Linnin	8 – Buragas	6 – Buragas	Ted Grant Court (254); DeWitt, NY
January 31, 2026; 2:00 p.m., NEC Front Row		at Stonehill	L 54–79	5–18 (3–7)	16 – Buragas	9 – Postell	3 – Postell	Merkert Gymnasium (289); Easton, MA
February 5, 2026; 6:00 p.m., NEC Front Row		Wagner	W 62–49	6–18 (4–7)	15 – Linnin	8 – Tied	3 – Buragas	Ted Grant Court (429); DeWitt, NY
February 7, 2026; 2:00 p.m., NEC Front Row		Saint Francis	W 62–50	7–18 (5–7)	23 – Buragas	8 – Buragas	3 – Tied	DeGol Arena (468); Loretto, PA
February 14, 2026; 2:00 p.m., NEC Front Row		at Chicago State	W 80–76	8–18 (6–7)	30 – Buragas	8 – Buragas	4 – Tied	Dickens Athletic Center; Chicago, IL
February 19, 2026; 6:00 p.m., NEC Front Row		Central Connecticut	W 65–46	9–18 (7–7)	11 – Tied	9 – Buragas	4 – E. Clark	Ted Grant Court (356); DeWitt, NY
February 21, 2026; 3:00 p.m., NEC Front Row		Stonehill	W 53–49	10–18 (8–7)	22 – Buragas	8 – Buragas	4 – E. Clark	Ted Grant Court (439); DeWitt, NY
February 26, 2026; 7:00 p.m., NEC Front Row		at Fairleigh Dickinson	L 38–66	10–19 (8–8)	8 – Tied	4 – Tied	3 – Buragas	Bogota Savings Bank Center (393); Hackensack, NJ
February 28, 2026; 1:00 p.m., ESPN+/NESN		New Haven	W 53–48	11–19 (9–8)	17 – Buragas	12 – Buragas	3 – E. Clark	Ted Grant Court (538); DeWitt, NY
March 5, 2026; 6:00 p.m., NEC Front Row		at Mercyhurst	L 66–72	11–20 (9–9)	14 – Dincher	12 – Buragas	4 – Wangolo	Owen McCormick Court (437); Erie, PA
NEC tournament
March 9, 2026; 7:00 p.m., NEC Front Row	(5)	at (4) Wagner; Quarterfinals	W 54–47	12–20	15 – E. Clark	10 – Tied	3 – Buragas	Spiro Sports Center (498); Staten Island, NY
March 12, 2026; 7:00 p.m., ESPN+	(5)	at (1) Fairleigh Dickinson; Semifinals	L 51–71	12–21	16 – Buragas	7 – Buragas	2 – E. Clark	Bogota Savings Bank Center (467); Hackensack, NJ
*Non-conference game. ^{#}Rankings from AP poll. (#) Tournament seedings in parentheses. All times are in Eastern.
