= 2025–26 George Washington Revolutionaries women's basketball team =

American college basketball season

2025–26 George Washington Revolutionaries women's basketball

WNIT, Great 8
- Conference: Atlantic 10 Conference
- Record: 18–18 (7–11 A-10)
- Head coach: Ganiyat Adeduntan (1st season)
- Assistant coaches: John Hampton; Brianna Finch; Sherill Baker; Lauren Coleman
- Home arena: Charles E. Smith Center

2025–26 Atlantic 10 women's basketball standings
	Conf.				Overall
Team	W		L	PCT	W		L	PCT
Rhode Island †	16	–	2	.889	28	–	5	.848
George Mason	16	–	2	.889	23	–	10	.697
Richmond	15	–	3	.833	26	–	8	.765
Davidson	12	–	6	.667	21	–	12	.636
Saint Joseph's	10	–	8	.556	20	–	11	.645
La Salle	10	–	8	.556	19	–	14	.576
Dayton	9	–	9	.500	17	–	14	.548
Loyola Chicago	9	–	9	.500	16	–	18	.471
St. Bonaventure	7	–	11	.389	17	–	16	.515
George Washington	7	–	11	.389	18	–	18	.500
Saint Louis	5	–	13	.278	12	–	21	.364
Duquesne	4	–	14	.222	12	–	19	.387
VCU	4	–	14	.222	8	–	23	.258
Fordham	2	–	16	.111	10	–	20	.333
† 2026 A10 tournament winner

The 2025–26 George Washington Revolutionaries women's basketball team represents George Washington University during the 2025–26 NCAA Division I women's basketball season. The Revolutionaries, led by first-year head coach Ganiyat Adeduntan, play their home games at Charles E. Smith Center in Washington, D.C. as members of the Atlantic 10 Conference.

== Previous season ==
The Revolutionaries finished the 2024–25 season 13–18, 5–13 in A-10 play, to finish in a tie for 12th place. They defeated Loyola Chicago, before falling to Rhode Island in the second round of the A-10 tournament.

Towards the end of the regular season, head coach Caroline McCombs announced her resignation on February 24, 2025, ending her four-year tenure with the team, with assistant coach Doug Novak being named interim head coach for the remainder of the season. On March 20, the school announced that they would be hiring former assistant coach and Colgate head coach Ganiyat Adeduntan as the team's new head coach.

== Preseason ==
On September 30, 2025, the Atlantic 10 Conference released their preseason poll. George Washington was picked to finish tenth in the conference.

=== Preseason rankings ===
Atlantic 10 Preseason Poll
Place	Team	Votes
1	Richmond	188 (9)
2	George Mason	185 (4)
3	Davidson	167 (1)
4	Rhode Island	137
5	Dayton	123
6	Saint Joseph's	120
7	VCU	110
8	Duquesne	95
9	Saint Louis	86
10	George Washington	75
11	Fordham	63
12	La Salle	56
13	Loyola Chicago	43
14	St. Bonaventure	22
(#) first-place votes

=== Preseason All-A10 Teams ===
Preseason All-A10 Teams
Team	Player	Year	Position
Second	Gabby Reynolds	Sophomore	Guard

=== Preseason All-A10 Defensive Team ===
No players were named to the Preseason All-A10 Defensive Team.

== Roster ==
2025–26 George Washington Revolutionaries women's basketball team
Players
Coaches

Pos.	#	Name	Height	Year	Previous school	Hometown
G	0	Jaeda Wilson	5 ft 8 in (1.73 m)	So	Georgetown	Potomac, Maryland
G	1	Gabby Reynolds	5 ft 9 in (1.75 m)	So	West Ottawa High School	Holland, Michigan
G	3	Payton Dulin	5 ft 9 in (1.75 m)	Fr	Baldwin High School	Baldwin, New York
F	4	Sara Lewis	6 ft 1 in (1.85 m)	Jr	Woodward Academy	Atlanta, Georgia
G	5	Nya Morris	5 ft 9 in (1.75 m)	GS	Claflin	Pittsburgh, Pennsylvania
G	7	Filipa Calisto	6 ft 0 in (1.83 m)	Sr	New Mexico Junior College	Beira, Mozambique
G	8	Tanah Becker	6 ft 1 in (1.85 m)	So	Kentucky	Winnipeg, Manitoba
G/F	9	Emma Theodorsson	6 ft 1 in (1.85 m)	Sr	Loyola Chicago	Pittsburgh, Pennsylvania
G	11	Mia James	5 ft 4 in (1.63 m)	Fr	Hebron Christian Academy	Dacula, Georgia
F	12	Kamari Sims	6 ft 1 in (1.85 m)	Jr	Riverdale Baptist School	Severn, Maryland
F	13	Caia Loving	6 ft 2 in (1.88 m)	Sr	Riverdale Baptist School	Upper Marlboro, Maryland
F	14	Silvia Gonzalez	6 ft 2 in (1.88 m)	Jr	Bryant	Sant Adrià de Besòs, Spain
G	22	Natalia Sierra-Vargas	5 ft 8 in (1.73 m)	Sr	The Bishop's School	San Diego, California
G	24	Colleen Phiri	5 ft 11 in (1.8 m)	Fr	Tilton School	Haverhill, Massachusetts

Head coach

- Ganiyat Adeduntan (Florida State)

Assistant coach(es)

- John Hampton (Mansfield)
- Brianna Finch (Sonoma State)
- Sherill Baker (Georgia)
- Lauren Coleman (Florida State)

Legend

- (C) Team captain
- (S) Suspended
- (I) Ineligible
- (W) Walk-on
- Injured
- Current redshirt

Roster
Last update: February 19, 2026

== Schedule and results ==
Date time, TV	Rank^{#}	Opponent^{#}	Result	Record	High points	High rebounds	High assists	Site (attendance) city, state
Regular season
November 3, 2025*; 5:00 pm, ESPN+		District of Columbia	W 86–47	1–0	18 – Phiri	5 – Tied	8 – James	Charles E. Smith Center (403); Washington, D.C.
November 7, 2025*; 7:00 pm, ESPN+		at Temple	L 50–86	1–1	11 – Tied	6 – Becker	2 – Tied	Liacouras Center (1,302); Philadelphia, PA
November 11, 2025*; 6:00 pm, ESPN+		Howard	L 60–62	1–2	15 – Reynolds	5 – Theodorsson	2 – Tied	Charles E. Smith Center (511); Washington, D.C.
November 17, 2025*; 7:00 pm, ESPN+		at Longwood	L 62–71	1–3	13 – Theodorsson	10 – Theodorsson	3 – Theodorsson	Joan Perry Brock Center (924); Farmville, VA
November 21, 2025*; 7:00 pm, ESPN+		at Georgetown	L 50−79	1−4	16 – Lewis	5 – Becker	3 – Sims	McDonough Arena (521); Washington, D.C.
November 23, 2025*; 2:00 pm, ESPN+		Morgan State	W 82−56	2−4	18 – Reynolds	8 – Loving	4 – James	Charles E. Smith Center (476); Washington, D.C.
November 28, 2025*; 1:30 pm, FloCollege		vs. Miami (FL); Cayman Islands Classic Little Cayman Division	L 77–83 ^{OT}	2–5	27 – Reynolds	9 – Loving	4 – Tied	John Gray Gymnasium; George Town, CI
November 29, 2025*; 1:30 pm, FloCollege		vs. Charlotte; Cayman Islands Classic Little Cayman Division	W 81–67	3–5	18 – Reynolds	9 – Loving	6 – Sims	John Gray Gymnasium (135); George Town, CI
December 3, 2025; 6:00 pm, Monumental/ESPN+		Dayton	W 54–42	4–5 (1–0)	19 – Reynolds	13 – Lewis	3 – Sims	Charles E. Smith Center (531); Washington, D.C.
December 6, 2025*; 1:00 pm, ESPN+		Brown	W 53–48	5–5	20 – Reynolds	7 – Tied	2 – Tied	Charles E. Smith Center (734); Washington, D.C.
December 10, 2025*; 7:00 pm, ESPN+		at Delaware	W 63–59	6–5	22 – Lewis	8 – Becker	2 – Tied	Bob Carpenter Center (733); Newark, DE
December 14, 2025*; 2:00 pm, ESPN+		American	W 70−44	7−5	19 – Reynolds	7 – Becker	5 – Tied	Charles E. Smith Center (756); Washington, D.C.
December 21, 2025*; 1:00 pm, ESPN+		Northwestern	W 75–62	8–5	21 – Reynolds	8 – Theodorsson	4 – Sims	Charles E. Smith Center (1,007); Washington, D.C.
December 28, 2025*; 2:00 pm, ESPN+		Coppin State	W 63–49	9–5	17 – Lewis	7 – Lewis	3 – Tied	Charles E. Smith Center (593); Washington, D.C.
December 31, 2025; 1:00 pm, ESPN+		at St. Bonaventure	L 53–54	9–6 (1–1)	16 – Reynolds	6 – Tied	3 – Sims	Reilly Center (440); St. Bonaventure, NY
January 3, 2026; 1:00 pm, ESPN+		at La Salle	L 52–66	9–7 (1–2)	9 – Phiri	7 – Lewis	4 – Sims	John Glaser Arena (205); Philadelphia, PA
January 7, 2026; 11:00 am, ESPN+		Rhode Island	L 70–79	9–8 (1–3)	16 – Lewis	5 – Phiri	2 – Tied	Charles E. Smith Center (970); Washington, D.C.
January 11, 2026; 12:00 pm, CBSSN		George Mason; Revolutionary Rivalry	L 46–59	9–9 (1–4)	10 – Tied	10 – Lewis	3 – Tied	Charles E. Smith Center (612); Washington, D.C.
January 14, 2026; 6:00 pm, ESPN+		at Duquesne	W 59–45	10–9 (2–4)	17 – Lewis	8 – Reynolds	4 – Lewis	UPMC Cooper Fieldhouse (676); Pittsburgh, PA
January 17, 2026; 2:00 pm, ESPN+		Loyola Chicago	L 48–53	10–10 (2–5)	15 – Lewis	9 – Lewis	3 – Wilson	Charles E. Smith Center (573); Washington, D.C.
January 21, 2026; 6:00 pm, ESPN+		at VCU	L 60–63	10–11 (2–6)	20 – Lewis	8 – Lewis	4 – Reynolds	Siegel Center (413); Richmond, VA
January 24, 2026; 6:00 pm, ESPN+		Fordham	W 58–47	11–11 (3–6)	14 – Reynolds	7 – Becker	4 – James	Charles E. Smith Center (527); Washington, D.C.
January 28, 2026; 6:00 pm, Monumental/ESPN+		Saint Louis	W 64–62	12–11 (4–6)	14 – Reynolds	8 – Tied	4 – Lewis	Charles E. Smith Center (406); Washington, D.C.
February 1, 2026; 2:00 pm, USA		at Dayton	W 66–54	13–11 (5–6)	17 – Reynolds	6 – Tied	2 – Tied	UD Arena (2,650); Dayton, OH
February 7, 2026; 1:00 pm, ESPN+		at Davidson	L 58–68	13–12 (5–7)	25 – Lewis	7 – Becker	3 – Reynolds	John M. Belk Arena (951); Davidson, NC
February 11, 2026; 11:00 am, ESPN+		at Saint Joseph's	L 63–70	13–13 (5–8)	20 – Wilson	6 – Sims	5 – Sims	Hagan Arena (1,580); Philadelphia, PA
February 14, 2026; 2:00 pm, Monumental/ESPN+		La Salle	L 52–67	13–14 (5–9)	13 – Sims	13 – Reynolds	5 – James	Charles E. Smith Center (702); Washington, D.C.
February 18, 2026; 6:00 pm, Monumental/ESPN+		Richmond	W 57–54 ^{OT}	14–14 (6–9)	22 – Reynolds	7 – Lewis	2 – Tied	Charles E. Smith Center (525); Washington, D.C.
February 21, 2026; 3:00 pm, Monumental/ESPN+		at George Mason; Revolutionary Rivalry	L 52–67	14–15 (6–10)	11 – Reynolds	7 – Lewis	3 – Lewis	EagleBank Arena (2,570); Fairfax, VA
February 25, 2026; 6:00 pm, ESPN+		St. Bonaventure	W 61–47	15–15 (7–10)	12 – Reynolds	9 – Tied	4 – Theodorsson	Charles E. Smith Center (726); Washington, D.C.
February 28, 2026; 2:30 pm, ESPN+		at Rhode Island	L 48–72	15–16 (7–11)	17 – Reynolds	5 – Sims	2 – Tied	Ryan Center (6,580); Kingston, RI
A-10 tournament
March 5, 2026; 5:00 p.m., ESPN+	(10)	vs. (7) Dayton; Second round	L 54–62	15–17	19 – Lewis	10 – Lewis	5 – Sims	Henrico Sports & Events Center (1,273); Henrico, VA
WNIT
March 19, 2026*; 6:00 p.m., ESPN+		Bradley; First round	W 63–60	16–17	21 – Reynolds	12 – Reynolds	3 – Tied	Charles E. Smith Center (510); Washington, D.C.
March 23, 2026*; 7:00 p.m., ESPN+		at Southern Indiana; Second round	W 61–58	17–17	26 – Reynolds	10 – Lewis	4 – Sims	Liberty Arena (1,310); Evansville, IN
March 27, 2026*; 6:00 p.m., ESPN+		Loyola Chicago; Super 16	W 71–62	18–17	25 – Lewis	13 – Lewis	8 – Lewis	Charles E. Smith Center (676); Washington, D.C.
March 30, 2026*; 7:30 p.m., ESPN+		at Illinois State; Great 8	L 53–61	18–18	17 – Sims	7 – Lewis	2 – Tied	CEFCU Arena (1,706); Normal, IL
*Non-conference game. ^{#}Rankings from AP Poll. (#) Tournament seedings in parentheses. All times are in Eastern.
