= 2025–26 Fairleigh Dickinson Knights women's basketball team =

American college basketball season

2025–26 Fairleigh Dickinson Knights women's basketball
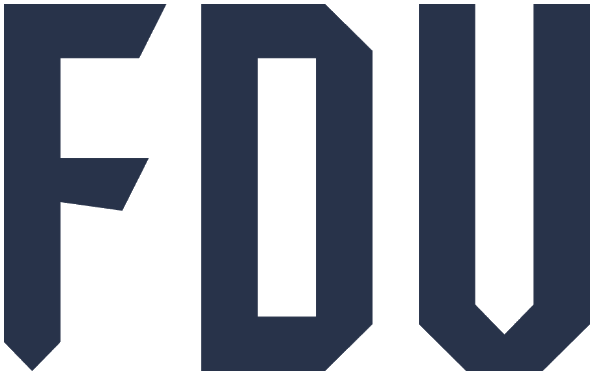

NEC regular season champions NEC tournament champions

NCAA tournament, First Round
- Conference: Northeast Conference
- Record: 30–5 (18–0 NEC)
- Head coach: Stephanie Gaitley (3rd season)
- Associate head coach: Jessica Simmonds
- Assistant coaches: Jeremy Thompson; Ty Rozier
- Home arena: Bogota Savings Bank Center

2025–26 Northeast Conference women's basketball standings
| | Conf. | | | | Overall |
| Team | W | | L | PCT | W | | L | PCT |
|---|---|---|---|---|---|---|---|---|
| Fairleigh Dickinson † | 18 | – | 0 | 1.000 | 30 | – | 5 | .857 |
| Mercyhurst* | 14 | – | 4 | .778 | 15 | – | 17 | .469 |
| LIU | 14 | – | 4 | .778 | 21 | – | 11 | .656 |
| Wagner | 9 | – | 9 | .500 | 13 | – | 17 | .433 |
| Le Moyne* | 9 | – | 9 | .500 | 12 | – | 21 | .364 |
| Chicago State | 8 | – | 10 | .444 | 9 | – | 23 | .281 |
| Stonehill | 8 | – | 10 | .444 | 12 | – | 18 | .400 |
| New Haven** | 5 | – | 13 | .278 | 7 | – | 22 | .241 |
| Saint Francis | 3 | – | 15 | .167 | 3 | – | 27 | .100 |
| Central Connecticut | 2 | – | 16 | .111 | 2 | – | 27 | .069 |
† 2026 NEC tournament winner * ineligible for the 2026 NCAA tournament due to transition from Division II ** ineligible for both the 2026 NEC tournament and the 2026 NCAA tournament due to transition from Division II

The 2025–26 Fairleigh Dickinson Knights women's basketball team represented Fairleigh Dickinson University during the 2025–26 NCAA Division I women's basketball season. The Knights, led by third-year head coach Stephanie Gaitley, played their home games in Hackensack, New Jersey at the Bogota Savings Bank Center as members of the Northeast Conference (NEC).

== Previous season ==
The Knights finished the 2024–25 season 29–4 and 16–0 in NEC play to finish in first place as regular season champions, becoming the first team to go undefeated in the NEC since Quinnipiac in the 2012–13 season (18–0).

As the No. 1 seed in the NEC tournament, they defeated No. 8 LIU, No. 6 Chicago State and No. 2 Stonehill to win the NEC title, their first since 1992, and earned a bid to the NCAA tournament for the first time in program history. They were seeded as No. 15 in Birmingham Regional 3, where they lost in the first round to No. 2 seed TCU.

== Offseason ==
=== Departures ===
Fairleigh Dickinson departures
| Name | Num | Pos. | Height | Year | Hometown | Reason for departure |
|---|---|---|---|---|---|---|
| Staci Williams | 1 | G | 5'8" | Sophomore | Holly Springs, NC | Transferred to UNC Wilmington (student only) |
| Dominique García Blackwood | 10 | G | 5'10" | Junior | Gran Canaria, Spain | Transferred to Florida Memorial (NAIA) |
| Abby Conklin | 11 | G | 5'7" | Graduate student | Irvington, NY | Graduated |
| Abaigeal Babore | 13 | G | 5'6" | Graduate student | Merchantville, NJ | Graduated |
| Teneisia Brown | 20 | F/C | 6'2" | Graduate student | Montego Bay, Jamaica | Transferred to Providence |
| Allie McGinn | 33 | G | 5'11" | Senior | Staten Island, NY | Graduated |

=== Incoming transfers ===
Fairleigh Dickinson incoming transfers
| Name | Num | Pos. | Height | Year | Hometown | Previous school |
|---|---|---|---|---|---|---|
| Madlena Gerke | 0 | G/F | 5'10" | Graduate student | Riga, Latvia | Evansville |

=== Recruiting class ===
There was no recruiting class for the class of 2025.

== Roster ==
2025–26 Fairleigh Dickinson Knights women's basketball team
Players
Coaches

| Pos. | # | Name | Height | Year | Previous school | Hometown |
|---|---|---|---|---|---|---|
| G/F | 0 | Madlena Gerke | 5 ft 10 in (1.78 m) | GS | Evansville | Riga, Latvia |
| G | 1 | Theresa Biladi | 5 ft 7 in (1.7 m) | Fr | Hamilton Girls' High School | Hamilton, New Zealand |
| F | 2 | Akeelah Lafleur | 6 ft 3 in (1.91 m) | Fr | BCIT | Willingboro, NJ |
| F | 3 | Bella Toomey | 5 ft 11 in (1.8 m) | Jr | Penn Charter School | Philadelphia, PA |
| G | 4 | Ava Renninger | 5 ft 6 in (1.68 m) | So | Archbishop Wood High School | Yardley, PA |
| G | 5 | Talia Baptiste | 5 ft 6 in (1.68 m) | So | Columbia High School | Maplewood, NJ |
| F | 12 | Sydney Stokes | 6 ft 0 in (1.83 m) | So | Mainland Regional High School | Irvington, NY |
| F | 14 | Joi Johnson | 5 ft 7 in (1.7 m) | So | Ewing High School | Ewing, NJ |
| F | 15 | Leah Crosby | 6 ft 0 in (1.83 m) | Fr | St. Thomas Aquinas High School | Plainfield, NJ |
| F | 20 | Madison Stuart | 5 ft 11 in (1.8 m) | Fr | Eastern Regional High School | Voorhees, NJ |
| G | 21 | Rebecca Osei-Owusu | 5 ft 11 in (1.8 m) | Jr | Monsignor Scanlan High School | Brooklyn, NY |
| G | 22 | Jada Elston | 5 ft 8 in (1.73 m) | Jr | Middle Township High School | Woodbine, NJ |
| F | 23 | Tyler Edwards | 5 ft 6 in (1.68 m) | So | Sanford School | Townsend, DE |
| G | 24 | Kaliee McDonald | 5 ft 9 in (1.75 m) | So | Worcester Academy | Lowell, MA |
| G | 25 | Reese Downey | 5 ft 6 in (1.68 m) | Fr | Absegami High School | Galloway, NJ |
| F | 45 | Lilly Parke | 6 ft 2 in (1.88 m) | Sr | Auburn Montgomery | Auckland, New Zealand |

Head coach

- Stephanie Gaitley (Villanova)

Assistant coach(es)

- Jessica Simmonds (George Washington)
- Jeremy Thompson (Muhlenberg)
- Ty Rozier (Fordham)

Legend

- (C) Team captain
- (S) Suspended
- (I) Ineligible
- (W) Walk-on
- Injured
- Current redshirt

Roster

== Schedule and results ==
| Date time, TV | Rank^{#} | Opponent^{#} | Result | Record | High points | High rebounds | High assists | Site (attendance) city, state |
Exhibition
| October 30, 2025*; 7:00 p.m. | | Villanova | L 37–57 | | 14 – McDonald | 7 – Renninger | 5 – Renninger | Bogota Savings Bank Center (200); Hackensack, NJ |
Non-conference regular season
| November 3, 2025*; 7:00 p.m., B1G+ | | at Purdue | L 48–67 | 0–1 | 10 – Renninger | 10 – Osei-Owusu | 4 – Renninger | Mackey Arena (4,726); West Lafayette, IN |
| November 5, 2025*; 7:00 p.m., ACCNX | | at No. 15 Notre Dame | L 52–98 | 0–2 | 15 – Renninger | 4 – Tied | 3 – Renninger | Purcell Pavilion (6,156); South Bend, IN |
| November 10, 2025*; 7:00 p.m., NEC Front Row | | Bloomfield | W 92–60 | 1–2 | 24 – Gerke | 9 – Crosby | 7 – Renninger | Bogota Savings Bank Center (479); Hackensack, NJ |
| November 12, 2025*; 7:00 p.m., ESPN+ | | at Manhattan | W 65–63 | 2–2 | 24 – Gerke | 9 – Crosby | 7 – Renninger | Draddy Gymnasium (274); Riverdale, NY |
| November 16, 2025*; 7:00 p.m., B1G+ | | at Rutgers | L 49–59 | 2–3 | 20 – Renniger | 10 – McDonald | 5 – McDonald | Jersey Mike's Arena (2,194); Piscataway, NJ |
| November 19, 2025*; 7:00 p.m., NEC Front Row | | Delaware State | W 72–41 | 3–3 | 23 – Gerke | 11 – Crosby | 7 – Renninger | Bogota Savings Bank Center (400); Hackensack, NJ |
| November 25, 2025*; 6:00 p.m., ESPN+ | | at NJIT | W 71–43 | 4–3 | 20 – Renninger | 9 – Crosby | 5 – Renninger | Wellness and Events Center (188); Newark, NJ |
| November 29, 2025*; 2:00 p.m., NEC Front Row | | Monmouth | W 63–50 | 5–3 | 18 – Renninger | 5 – Crosby | 6 – Renninger | Bogota Savings Bank Center (395); Hackensack, NJ |
| December 4, 2025*; 7:00 p.m., NEC Front Row | | Lafayette | W 69–61 | 6–3 | 23 – McDonald | 12 – Osei-Owusu | 7 – Renninger | Bogota Savings Bank Center (279); Hackensack, NJ |
| December 10, 2025*; 6:00 p.m., ESPN+ | | at Saint Peter's | W 57–34 | 7–3 | 15 – Renninger | 8 – Osei-Owusu | 5 – Tied | Yanitelli Center (235); Jersey City, NJ |
| December 20, 2025*; 1:00 p.m., NEC Front Row | | Ursinus | W 85–19 | 8–3 | 22 – McDonald | 9 – Renninger | 5 – Tied | Bogota Savings Bank Center (139); Hackensack, NJ |
| December 29, 2025*; 2:00 p.m., NEC Front Row | | Binghamton; FDU Christmas Classic | L 51–62 | 8–4 | 11 – McDonald | 13 – Osei-Owusu | 5 – Renninger | Bogota Savings Bank Center (107); Hackensack, NJ |
| December 30, 2025*; 4:00 p.m., NEC Front Row | | Maryland Eastern Shore; FDU Christmas Classic | W 85–57 | 9–4 | 19 – Renninger | 6 – Crosby | 3 – Tied | Bogota Savings Bank Center (139); Hackensack, NJ |
NEC regular season
| January 2, 2026; 5:00 p.m., NEC Front Row | | at Mercyhurst | W 68–46 | 10–4 (1–0) | 17 – Osei-Owusu | 10 – Osei-Owusu | 4 – Renninger | Owen McCormick Court (234); Erie, PA |
| January 4, 2026; 1:00 p.m., NEC Front Row | | at Saint Francis | W 73–28 | 11–4 (2–0) | 13 – McDonald | 8 – Lafleur | 6 – Renninger | DeGol Arena (127); Loretto, PA |
| January 8, 2026; 6:00 p.m., NEC Front Row | | at Chicago State | W 91–64 | 12–4 (3–0) | 15 – Renninger | 6 – Gerke | 5 – Renninger | Jones Convocation Center (79); Chicago, IL |
| January 10, 2026; 2:00 p.m., NEC Front Row | | New Haven | W 65–57 | 13–4 (4–0) | 16 – McDonald | 9 – Osei-Owusu | 8 – Renninger | Bogota Savings Bank Center (139); Hackensack, NJ |
| January 15, 2026; 7:00 p.m., NEC Front Row | | at Wagner | W 56–46 | 14–4 (5–0) | 17 – Renninger | 8 – McDonald | 3 – McDonald | Spiro Sports Center (249); Staten Island, NY |
| January 17, 2026; 2:00 p.m., NEC Front Row | | at LIU | W 59–58 | 15–4 (6–0) | 16 – McDonald | 7 – Renninger | 5 – Renninger | Steinberg Wellness Center (183); Brooklyn, NY |
| January 22, 2026; 7:00 p.m., NEC Front Row | | Central Connecticut | W 76–45 | 16–4 (7–0) | 18 – McDonald | 6 – Tied | 4 – Renninger | Bogota Savings Bank Center (300); Hackensack, NJ |
| January 24, 2026; 1:00 p.m., NEC Front Row | | at Le Moyne | W 56–41 | 17–4 (8–0) | 21 – Gerke | 8 – Renninger | 5 – Renninger | Ted Grant Court (216); Syracuse, NY |
| January 29, 2026; 5:00 p.m., NEC Front Row | | Stonehill; We Back Pat | W 78–54 | 18–4 (9–0) | 24 – Gerke | 10 – Renninger | 7 – Renninger | Bogota Savings Bank Center (275); Hackensack, NJ |
| January 31, 2026; 2:00 p.m., NEC Front Row | | Wagner | W 52–45 | 19–4 (10–0) | 12 – Crosby | 12 – Osei-Owusu | 4 – Renninger | Bogota Savings Bank Center (439); Hackensack, NJ |
| February 5, 2026; 7:00 p.m., NEC Front Row | | at Stonehill | W 80–49 | 20–4 (11–0) | 15 – Tied | 6 – Renninger | 5 – Osei-Owusu | Merkert Gymnasium (112); Easton, MA |
| February 7, 2026; 7:00 p.m., NEC Front Row | | Mercyhurst; Play4Kay | W 84–64 | 21–4 (12–0) | 17 – Crosby | 11 – Crosby | 4 – Tied | Bogota Savings Bank Center (309); Hackensack, NJ |
| February 14, 2026; 7:00 p.m., NEC Front Row | | at Central Connecticut | W 77–36 | 22–4 (13–0) | 18 – Gerke | 11 – Johnson | 7 – Renninger | Detrick Gymnasium (153); New Britain, CT |
| February 19, 2026; 7:00 p.m., NEC Front Row | | Chicago State | W 66–52 | 23–4 (14–0) | 18 – Gerke | 7 – Tied | 4 – Renninger | Bogota Savings Bank Center (314); Hackensack, NJ |
| February 21, 2026; 1:00 p.m., NEC Front Row | | at New Haven | W 69–55 | 24–4 (15–0) | 21 – McDonald | 10 – Osei-Owusu | 12 – Renninger | The Hazell Center (604); West Haven, CT |
| February 26, 2026; 7:00 p.m., NEC Front Row | | Le Moyne | W 66–38 | 25–4 (16–0) | 14 – Gerke | 9 – Renninger | 4 – Renninger | Bogota Savings Bank Center (393); Hackensack, NJ |
| February 28, 2026; 2:00 p.m., NEC Front Row | | LIU; Senior Day | W 82–49 | 26–4 (17–0) | 18 – McDonald | 12 – Renninger | 5 – Renninger | Bogota Savings Bank Center (450); Hackensack, NJ |
| March 5, 2026; 11:00 a.m., NEC Front Row | | Saint Francis | W 61–39 | 27–4 (18–0) | 17 – McDonald | 6 – Tied | 7 – Renninger | Bogota Savings Bank Center (1,000); Hackensack, NJ |
NEC tournament
| March 9, 2026; 7:00 p.m., NEC Front Row | (1) | (8) Saint Francis; Quarterfinals | W 81–56 | 28–4 | 19 – Renninger | 9 – Lafleur | 5 – Renninger | Bogota Savings Bank Center (459); Hackensack, NJ |
| March 12, 2026; 7:00 p.m., ESPN+/NESN | (1) | (5) Le Moyne; Semifinals | W 71–51 | 29–4 | 21 – Renninger | 10 – Renninger | 5 – Renninger | Bogota Savings Bank Center (467); Hackensack, NJ |
| March 15, 2026; 12:00 p.m., ESPNU | (1) | (3) LIU; Championship | W 79–57 | 30–4 | 15 – Lafleur | 14 – Crosby | 6 – Renninger | Bogota Savings Bank Center (590); Hackensack, NJ |
NCAA tournament
| March 21, 2026; 4:00 p.m., ESPN | (15 S4) | at (2 S4) No. 7 Iowa; First Round | L 48–58 | 30–5 | 13 – Renninger | 5 – Renninger | 3 – Tied | Carver-Hawkeye Arena (14,332); Iowa City, IA |
*Non-conference game. ^{#}Rankings from AP poll. (#) Tournament seedings in parentheses. Sacramento 4=S4. All times are in Eastern.
