= 2021 GLIAC men's basketball tournament =

Men's Basketball Tournament

2021 Great Lakes Intercollegiate Athletic Conference men's basketball tournament
- Classification: Division II
- Teams: 10
- Site: John Friend Court; Hammond, IN
- Champions: Ashland (1st title)
- Winning coach: John Ellenwood (1st title)
- MVP: Brandon Haraway (Ashland)
- Top scorer: Aaron Thompson (Ashland)
- Great Lakes Intercollegiate Athletic Conference men's basketball tournaments

The 2021 Great Lakes Intercollegiate Athletic Conference men's basketball tournament was a postseason men's basketball tournament for the GLIAC of the 2020–21 NCAA Division II men's basketball season which took place March 2–5, 2021. The Semi-Finals and Finals were played in John Friend Court in Hammond, Indiana, with the first two rounds being held at the home stadium of the team that had the better record of their respective matchup. For example, the matchup between #3 Michigan Tech and #6 Purdue Northwest would be hosted by Michigan Tech.

Ashland defeated Michigan Tech 85–77 in the championship game to win the college's first GLIAC tournament title. As a result of the win, they received the conference's automatic bid to the NCAA DII tournament.

== Seeds ==
Ten of the GLIAC members and affiliate members participated in the GLIAC Tournament. Teams were seeded by conference record, with a tiebreaker system used to seed teams with identical conference records. The top 6 teams received a first round bye. Tiebreakers occurred if two teams received the same amount of points for the tournament.

| Seed | School | Conference | Tiebreak 1 |
|---|---|---|---|
| 1 | Wayne State | 12–5 | |
| 2 | Grand Valley St | 11-6 | |
| 3 | Michigan Tech | 12-6 | |
| 4 | Ferris State | 8-8 | |
| 5 | Ashland | 11-7 | |
| 6 | Purdue Northwest | 8-8 | |
| 7 | Parkside | 9-10 | |
| 8 | Lake Superior State | 8-10 | |
| 9 | Northwood | 6-12 | |
| 10 | Saginaw Valley State | 7–12 | |

== Schedule ==
| Session | Game | Time* | Matchup^{#} | Score |
First round – Tuesday, March 2
| 1 | 1 | 8:00 PM | No. 8 Parkside vs. No. 9 Saginaw Valley State | 72-77 |
| 1 | 2 | N/A | No. 7 Lake Superior State vs. No. 10 Northwood | Cancelled |
Quarterfinals – Thursday, March 4
| 2 | 3 | 12:00 PM | No. 1 Wayne State vs. No. 8 Saginaw Valley State | 74-76 |
| 2 | 4 | 3:15 PM | No. 4 Ferris State vs. No. 5 Ashland | 85-100 |
| 3 | 5 | 6:30 PM | No. 2 Grand Valley State vs. No. 7 Lake Superior State | 72-57 |
| 3 | 6 | 9:45 pm | No. 3 Michigan Tech vs. No. 6 Purdue Northwest | 74-63 |
Semifinals – Friday, March 5
| 4 | 7 | 4:00 pm | No. 5 Ashland vs. No. 8 Saginaw Valley State | 83-57 |
| 4 | 8 | 7:30 pm | No. 2 Grand Valley State vs. No. 3 Michigan Tech | 59-65 |
Championship – Sunday, March 7
| 5 | 9 | 2:30 pm | No. 3 Michigan Tech vs. No. 5 Ashland | 77-85 |

*Game times in Eastern Time. #Rankings denote tournament seeding.

== Bracket ==
Round 1 (March 2, 2021)
8 | Parkside | 72
9 | Saginaw Valley State | 77
7 | Lake Superior State | 0
10 | Northwood | 0

Quarterfinals; March 4, 2021
1 | Wayne State | 74
9 | Saginaw Valley State | 76
4 | Ferris State | 85
5 | Ashland | 100
3 | Michigan Tech | 74
6 | Purdue Northwest | 63
2 | Grand Valley State | 72
7 | Lake Superior State | 57

Semifinals; March 5, 2021
9 | Saginaw Valley State | 57
5 | Ashland | 83
2 | Grand Valley State | 59
3 | Michigan Tech | 65

Championship; March 7, 2021
5 | Ashland | 85
3 | Michigan Tech | 77

== Game summaries ==
=== First round ===
March 2
8:00 PM

Recap

No. 8 Parkside 72, No. 9 Saginaw Valley St 77
Scoring by half: 38-33, 34−44
| Pts: Ramar Evans, 24; Rebs: Brandon Hau, 8 Asts: Vinson Sigmon Jr, 7 | Pts: Delano Smith, 32; Rebs: Delano Smith, 9 Asts: Myles, Belyeu, 3 |

De Simone Gymnasium
Kenosha, WI

March 2
NA

Cancelled

No. 7 Lake Superior State 0, No. 10 Northwood 0
Scoring by half: 0−0, 0−0

Ronald Cooper Gymnasium
Sault Ste Marie, MI

=== Quarterfinals ===
March 4
12:00 PM

Recap

No. 1 Wayne State 74, No. 9 Saginaw Valley St 76
Scoring by half: 28−36, 46−40
| Pts: Brailen Neely, 28; Rebs: Avery Lewis, 11; Asts: Tied, 3 | Pts: Myles Belyeu, 35; Rebs: Delano Smith, 6 Asts: Delano Smith, 4 |

John Friend Court
Hammond, IN

March 4
3:15 PM

Recap

No. 4 Ferris State 85, No. 5 Ashland 100
Scoring by half: 46−56, 39−44
| Pts: Walt Kelser, 25; Rebs: Logan Ryan, 6 Asts: Tied, 4 | Pts: Brandon Haraway, 35; Rebs: Aaron Thompson, 7 Asts: Tied |

John Friend Court
Hammond, IN

March 4
6:30 PM

Recap

No. 2 Grand Valley State 72, No. 7 Lake Superior State 57
Scoring by half: 28-33, 44-24
| Pts: Justin Fischer, 19; Rebs: Kemon Bassett, 8 Asts: Tied, 3 | Pts: Christian Negron, 22; Rebs: Christian Negron, 13; Asts: Jake Van Tubbergen, 5 |

Lucas Oil Stadium
Indianapolis, IN

March 4
9:45 PM

Recap

No. 3 Michigan Tech 74, No. 6 Purdue Northwest 63
Scoring by half: 43-32, 31-31
| Pts: Dawson Bilski, 26; Rebs: Trent Bell, 13; Asts: Carter Johnston, 5 | Pts: Mikell Cooper, 25; Rebs: Vincent Miszkiewicz, 12; Asts: Tied, 2 |

Lucas Oil Stadium
Indianapolis, IN

=== Semifinals ===
March 5
4:00 PM

Recap

No. 9 Saginaw Valley State 57, No. 5 Ashland 83
Scoring by half: 26-48, 31-35
| Pts: Myles Belyeu, 19; Rebs: Tied, 7 Asts: Tied, 2 | Pts: Brandon Haraway, 25; Rebs: Aaron Thompson, 15; Asts: Aaron Thompson, 4 |

Lucas Oil Stadium
Indianapolis, IN

March 5
7:30 PM

Recap

No. 2 Grand Valley State 59, No. 3 Michigan Tech 65
Scoring by half: 30-34, 29-31
| Pts: Jake Van Tubbergen, 19; Rebs: Christian Negron, 11; Asts: Tied, 2 | Pts: Trent Bell, Owen White, 17; Rebs: Trent Bell, 11; Asts: Carter Johnston, 7 |

Lucas Oil Stadium
Indianapolis, IN

=== Championship ===
March 7
2:30 PM

Recap

No. 5 Ashland 85, No 3. Michigan Tech 77
Scoring by half: 44-42, 41−35
| Pts: Aaron Thompson, 32; Rebs: Aaron Thompson, 9 Asts: Aaron Thompson, 4 | Pts: Owen White, 33; Rebs: Trent Bell, 11; Asts: Carter Johnston, 5 |

Lucas Oil Stadium
Indianapolis, IN
