= 2026 NEC women's basketball tournament =

2026 Northeast Conference women's basketball tournament
- Classification: Division I
- Season: 2025–26
- Teams: 8
- Site: Campus sites
- Television: ESPNU, ESPN+, NEC Front Row

2025–26 Northeast Conference women's basketball standings
	Conf.				Overall
Team	W		L	PCT	W		L	PCT
Fairleigh Dickinson †	18	–	0	1.000	30	–	5	.857
Mercyhurst*	14	–	4	.778	15	–	17	.469
LIU	14	–	4	.778	21	–	11	.656
Wagner	9	–	9	.500	13	–	17	.433
Le Moyne*	9	–	9	.500	12	–	21	.364
Chicago State	8	–	10	.444	9	–	23	.281
Stonehill	8	–	10	.444	12	–	18	.400
New Haven**	5	–	13	.278	7	–	22	.241
Saint Francis	3	–	15	.167	3	–	27	.100
Central Connecticut	2	–	16	.111	2	–	27	.069
† 2026 NEC tournament winner * ineligible for the 2026 NCAA tournament due to transition from Division II ** ineligible for both the 2026 NEC tournament and the 2026 NCAA tournament due to transition from Division II

The 2026 NEC Women's Basketball Tournament was the postseason women's basketball tournament for the Northeast Conference for the 2025–26 NCAA Division I women's basketball season. The tournament was held on three dates between March 9 and 15, 2026, with all tournament games played in the home arenas of the better-seeded school. The winner received the conference's auto bid into the 2026 NCAA tournament.

This will also the first women's tournament held under the "NEC" name. On October 2, 2025, the conference changed its name from the Northeast Conference to its longstanding initialism of NEC.

== Seeds ==
Seed	School	Conf.	Tiebreaker
1	Fairleigh Dickinson	18–0	
2	Mercyhurst	14–4	2–0 vs. Wagner
3	LIU	14–4	1–1 vs. Wagner
4	Wagner	9–9	1–1 vs. LIU
5	Le Moyne	9–9	0–2 vs. LIU
6	Chicago State	8–10	1–1 vs. Mercyhurst
7	Stonehill	8–10	0–2 vs. Mercyhurst
DNQ	New Haven	5–13	
8	Saint Francis	3–15	
DNQ	Central Connecticut	2–16	

== Schedule ==
Game	Time*	Matchup	Score	Television	Attendance
Quarterfinals – Monday, March 9
1	6 p.m.	No. 7 Stonehill at No. 2 Mercyhurst	64–70	NEC Front Row	409
2	7 p.m.	No. 8 Saint Francis at No. 1 FDU	56–81	NEC Front Row	459
3	7 p.m.	No. 6 Chicago State at No. 3 LIU	77–99	NEC Front Row	179
4	7 p.m.	No. 5 Le Moyne at No. 4 Wagner	54–47	NEC Front Row	498
Semifinals – Thursday, March 12
5	7 p.m.	No. 5 Le Moyne at No. 1 FDU	51–71	ESPN+	467
6	7 p.m.	No. 3 LIU at No. 2 Mercyhurst	82–64	ESPN+	463
Championship – Sunday, March 15
7	Noon	No. 3 LIU at No. 1 FDU	57–79	ESPNU	590
*Game times in ET. Rankings denote tournament seed.

== Bracket ==
Teams will be reseeded after each round with highest remaining seeds receiving home-court advantage.

Quarterfinals; Monday, March 9 NEC Front Row
1	Fairleigh Dickinson	81
8	St. Francis (PA)	56
2	Mercyhurst	70
7	Stonehill	64
Pairings are reseeded after the quarterfinals.
3	LIU	99
6	Chicago State	77
4	Wagner	47
5	Le Moyne	54

Semifinals; Thursday, March 12; ESPN+
1	Fairleigh Dickinson	71
5	Le Moyne	51
2	Mercyhurst	64
3	LIU	82

Final; Sunday, March 15; ESPNU
1	Fairleigh Dickinson	79
3	LIU	57
