= 2025–26 St. Bonaventure Bonnies women's basketball team =

American college basketball season

2025–26 St. Bonaventure Bonnies women's basketball
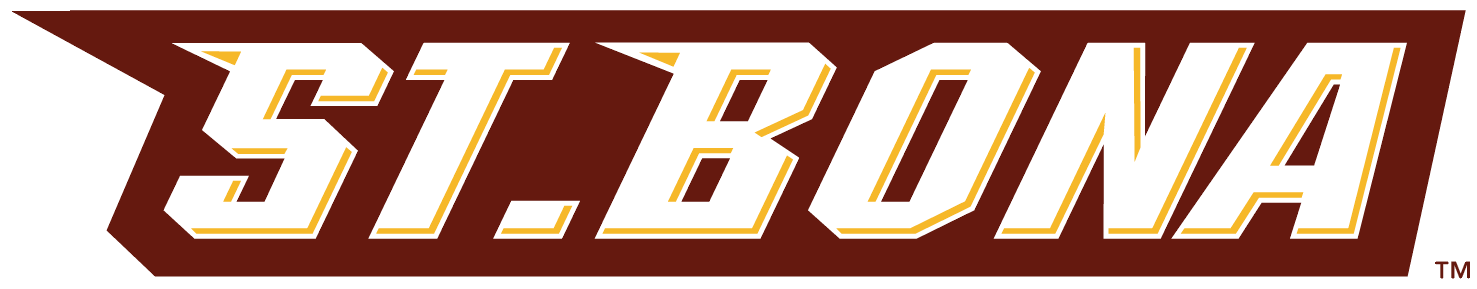

WNIT, second round
- Conference: Atlantic 10 Conference
- Record: 17–16 (7–11 A-10)
- Head coach: Jim Crowley (3rd season, 19th overall season)
- Associate head coach: Tiara Johnson
- Assistant coaches: Kelcie Rombach; Jim Brunelli; Kaserra Owens
- Home arena: Reilly Center

2025–26 Atlantic 10 women's basketball standings
	Conf.				Overall
Team	W		L	PCT	W		L	PCT
Rhode Island †	16	–	2	.889	28	–	5	.848
George Mason	16	–	2	.889	23	–	10	.697
Richmond	15	–	3	.833	26	–	8	.765
Davidson	12	–	6	.667	21	–	12	.636
Saint Joseph's	10	–	8	.556	20	–	11	.645
La Salle	10	–	8	.556	19	–	14	.576
Dayton	9	–	9	.500	17	–	14	.548
Loyola Chicago	9	–	9	.500	16	–	18	.471
St. Bonaventure	7	–	11	.389	17	–	16	.515
George Washington	7	–	11	.389	18	–	18	.500
Saint Louis	5	–	13	.278	12	–	21	.364
Duquesne	4	–	14	.222	12	–	19	.387
VCU	4	–	14	.222	8	–	23	.258
Fordham	2	–	16	.111	10	–	20	.333
† 2026 A10 tournament winner

The 2025–26 St. Bonaventure Bonnies women's basketball team represented St. Bonaventure University during the 2025–26 NCAA Division I women's basketball season. The Bonnies, led by head coach Jim Crowley in the third season of his second stint as head coach, and 19th season overall, played their home games at the Reilly Center in St. Bonaventure, New York as members of the Atlantic 10 Conference (A-10).

The Bonnies finished the season 17–16, 7–11 in A-10 play, to finish in a tie for ninth place.

== Previous season ==
The Bonnies finished the 2024–25 season 6–22, 2–15 in A-10 play, to finish in 15th (last) place. They were defeated by Saint Louis in the first round of the A-10 tournament.

== Preseason ==
On September 30, 2025, the Atlantic 10 Conference released their preseason poll. St. Bonaventure was picked to finish 14th (last) in the conference.

=== Preseason rankings ===
Atlantic 10 Preseason Poll
Place	Team	Votes
1	Richmond	188 (9)
2	George Mason	185 (4)
3	Davidson	167 (1)
4	Rhode Island	137
5	Dayton	123
6	Saint Joseph's	120
7	VCU	110
8	Duquesne	95
9	Saint Louis	86
10	George Washington	75
11	Fordham	63
12	La Salle	56
13	Loyola Chicago	43
14	St. Bonaventure	22
(#) first-place votes

=== Preseason All-A-10 Teams ===
No players were named to the First, Second or Third Preseason All-A-10 Teams.

=== Preseason All-A-10 Defensive Team ===
No players were named to the Preseason All-A-10 Defensive Team.

== Roster ==
2025–26 St. Bonaventure Bonnies women's basketball team
Players
Coaches

Pos.	#	Name	Height	Year	Previous school	Hometown
G	0	Diamond Fields	5 ft 9 in (1.75 m)	Fr	Monsignor Scanlan High School	The Bronx, NY
G	1	Mackenzie Pettinelli	5 ft 10 in (1.78 m)	So	Spring-Ford High School	Collegeville, PA
G	2	Kaylee Krysztof	5 ft 9 in (1.75 m)	Jr	Binghamton	Buffalo, NY
G	4	Mallory Heise	5 ft 7 in (1.7 m)	Fr	Hilton High School	Hilton, NY
G	5	Aaliyah Parker	5 ft 9 in (1.75 m)	GS	Niagara	Cheektowaga, NY
F	10	Mya Davidson	6 ft 2 in (1.88 m)	RS Jr	Three Rivers College	Rockford, IL
G	12	Ivona Djikanovic	6 ft 0 in (1.83 m)	Fr	AZ Compass Prep	Belgrade, Serbia
F	14	Gabby Robinson	6 ft 2 in (1.88 m)	Sr	Gulf Coast State	Brampton, ON
F	15	Kylie Buckley	6 ft 0 in (1.83 m)	Jr	Oakland	Livonia, NY
G	22	Olivia DiFranco	5 ft 10 in (1.78 m)	So	Eastern Michigan	Elyria, OH
F	23	Brianna Barr-Buday	6 ft 2 in (1.88 m)	RS Fr	Nichols School	Grand Island, NY
G	24	Laycee Drake	5 ft 6 in (1.68 m)	GS	Albany	Hancock, NY
G	30	Elyse MacDonough	5 ft 8 in (1.73 m)	Fr	Worcester Academy	South Burlington, VT
F	33	Iva Corluka	6 ft 1 in (1.85 m)	Fr	Ardsley High School	Ardsley, NY
F	44	Brillana Boyd	5 ft 10 in (1.78 m)	Jr	Long Beach City College	Redondo Beach, CA

Head coach

- Jim Crowley (Keuka)

Assistant coach(es)

- Tiara Johnson (St. Bonaventure)
- Kelcie Rombach (St. Bonaventure)
- Jim Brunelli (Clarion)
- Kaserra Owens (Pitt–Bradford)

Legend

- (C) Team captain
- (S) Suspended
- (I) Ineligible
- (W) Walk-on
- Injured
- Current redshirt

Roster
Last update: February 18, 2026

== Schedule and results ==
Date time, TV	Rank^{#}	Opponent^{#}	Result	Record	High points	High rebounds	High assists	Site (attendance) city, state
Exhibition
October 29, 2025*; 4:30 p.m.		Daemen	W 79–68	–	19 – Parker	5 – 4 tied	4 – Pettinelli	Reilly Center (452); St. Bonaventure, NY
Regular season
November 3, 2025*; 6:00 p.m., ESPN+		Mansfield	W 82–34	1–0	16 – Drake	6 – Buckley	2 – 6 tied	Reilly Center (387); St. Bonaventure, NY
November 7, 2025*; 6:00 p.m., ESPN+		at Niagara	W 74–56	2–0	19 – Drake	8 – Drake	2 – 2 tied	Gallagher Center (1,347); Lewiston, NY
November 11, 2025*; 7:00 p.m., ESPN+		at Binghamton	W 68–65	3–0	20 – Drake	8 – Drake	5 – Heise	Events Center (1,210); Vestal, NY
November 14, 2025*; 6:00 p.m., ESPN+		Canisius	W 66–61	4–0	22 – Parker	12 – Parker	4 – Djikanovic	Reilly Center (315); St. Bonaventure, NY
November 19, 2025*; 6:00 p.m., ESPN+		Buffalo	W 64−57	5−0	21 – Drake	14 – Drake	3 – Parker	Reilly Center (258); St. Bonaventure, NY
November 22, 2025*; 1:00 p.m., ESPN+/YES		Albany	L 53−62	5−1	18 – Parker	7 – Parker	2 – 2 tied	Reilly Center (413); St. Bonaventure, NY
November 26, 2025*; 6:00 p.m., ESPN+		at Cleveland State; CSU Invitational	L 71–75	5–2	23 – Drake	6 – Parker	2 – 4 tied	Woodling Gym (294); Cleveland, OH
November 28, 2025*; 4:00 p.m., YouTube		vs. Radford; CSU Invitational	W 55–45	6–2	16 – Parker	8 – Drake	3 – 2 tied	Woodling Gym (354); Cleveland, OH
November 29, 2025*; 1:00 p.m., YouTube		vs. Valparaiso; CSU Invitational	W 87–55	7–2	17 – Drake	8 – Drake	6 – MacDonough	Woodling Gym (299); Cleveland, OH
December 3, 2025; 8:00 p.m., ESPN+		at Saint Louis	L 70–76	7–3 (0–1)	16 – 2 tied	7 – Djikanovic	5 – Drake	Chaifetz Arena (257); St. Louis, MO
December 6, 2025*; 1:00 p.m., NECFR		at Le Moyne	W 66–57	8–3	21 – Drake	8 – Parker	4 – Drake	Ted Grant Court (276); DeWitt, NY
December 12, 2026*; 6:00 p.m., NECFR		at Mercyhurst	W 60−57	9−3	19 – Drake	10 – Drake	3 – 2 tied	Owen McCormick Court (301); Erie, PA
December 20, 2025*; 2:00 p.m., ESPN+		at Howard	L 64–76	9–4	17 – Parker	6 – Drake	4 – Drake	Burr Gymnasium (538); Washington, D.C.
December 31, 2025; 1:00 p.m., ESPN+		George Washington	W 54–53	10–4 (1–1)	21 – Drake	6 – Drake	3 – Pettinelli	Reilly Center (440); St. Bonaventure, NY
January 3, 2026; 3:00 p.m., ESPN+/YES		Richmond	L 60–80	10–5 (1–2)	18 – Parker	6 – 2 tied	2 – 3 tied	Reilly Center (427); St. Bonaventure, NY
January 7, 2026; 6:00 p.m., ESPN+		at Duquesne	W 46–38	11–5 (2–2)	15 – Parker	8 – Drake	2 – Drake	UPMC Cooper Fieldhouse (660); Pittsburgh, PA
January 10, 2026; 1:00 p.m., ESPN+		at Rhode Island	L 45–66	11–6 (2–3)	12 – Drake	7 – Drake	3 – Drake	Ryan Center (1,617); Kingston, RI
January 14, 2026; 6:00 p.m., ESPN+		Saint Joseph's	W 57–48	12–6 (3–3)	11 – Parker	10 – Parker	4 – Parker	Reilly Center (305); St. Bonaventure, NY
January 18, 2026; 2:00 p.m., ESPN+		at Fordham	L 53–66	12–7 (3–4)	15 – Parker	7 – 2 tied	2 – 5 tied	Rose Hill Gymnasium (504); The Bronx, NY
January 21, 2026; 6:00 p.m., ESPN+		George Mason	L 48–57	12–8 (3–5)	11 – Parker	7 – Parker	2 – 3 tied	Reilly Center (404); St. Bonaventure, NY
January 24, 2026; 1:00 p.m., ESPN+/YES		La Salle	L 74–83	12–9 (3–6)	16 – Drake	6 – 2 tied	3 – Boyd	Reilly Center (252); St. Bonaventure, NY
January 28, 2026; 7:00 p.m., ESPN+		at Dayton	L 71–75	12–10 (3–7)	29 – Drake	5 – Parker	4 – Pettinelli	UD Arena (2,319); Dayton, OH
January 31, 2026; 3:00 p.m., ESPN+		at Loyola Chicago	L 52–60	12–11 (3–8)	12 – Drake	5 – 2 tied	7 – Drake	Joseph J. Gentile Arena (499); Chicago, IL
February 4, 2026; 6:00 p.m., ESPN+/YES		Davidson	W 59–50	13–11 (4–8)	14 – Drake	8 – Drake	3 – 2 tied	Reilly Center (395); St. Bonaventure, NY
February 7, 2026; 1:00 p.m., ESPN+		Duquesne	W 72–71 ^{OT}	14–11 (5–8)	15 – Barr-Buday	9 – Drake	4 – Drake	Reilly Center (405); St. Bonaventure, NY
February 11, 2026; 6:00 p.m., ESPN+		at Richmond	L 52–75	14–12 (5–9)	13 – Boyd	8 – Boyd	6 – Drake	Robins Center (1,207); Richmond, VA
February 14, 2026; 1:00 p.m., ESPN+		at VCU	W 64–53	15–12 (6–9)	22 – Drake	8 – Drake	5 – Parker	Siegel Center (1,520); Richmond, VA
February 21, 2026; 3:00 p.m., ESPN+/YES		Loyola Chicago	L 55–58	15–13 (7–9)	18 – Drake	6 – 2 tied	3 – Drake	Reilly Center (427); St. Bonaventure, NY
February 25, 2026; 6:00 p.m., ESPN+		at George Washington	L 47–61	15–14 (6–11)	12 – Parker	7 – Parker	3 – Drake	Charles E. Smith Center (726); Washington, D.C.
February 28, 2026; 1:00 p.m., ESPN+		Fordham	W 77–69	16–14 (7–11)	26 – Drake	8 – Drake	3 – 2 tied	Reilly Center (357); St. Bonaventure, NY
A-10 tournament
March 5, 2026; 11:00 a.m., ESPN+	(9)	vs. (8) Loyola Chicago; Second round	L 59–61	16–15	16 – Parker	12 – Drake	5 – Drake	Henrico Sports & Events Center (1,434); Henrico, VA
WNIT
March 19, 2026; 6:00 p.m., ESPN+		Drexel; First round	W 69–67 ^{OT}	17–15	24 – Drake	10 – Parker	4 – Pettinelli	Reilly Center (852); St. Bonaventure, NY
March 23, 2026; 6:00 p.m., ESPN+		at Middle Tennessee; Second round	L 50–69	17–16	14 – Drake	6 – Drake	3 – 2 tied	Murphy Center (4,070); Murfreesboro, TN
*Non-conference game. ^{#}Rankings from AP poll. (#) Tournament seedings in parentheses. All times are in Eastern.
