= 2025–26 Michigan State Spartans women's basketball team =

American college basketball season

2025–26 Michigan State Spartans women's basketball

Nassau Championship Junkanoo Division champions Cherokee Invitational champions

NCAA tournament, Second Round
- Conference: Big Ten Conference

Ranking
- Coaches: No. 20
- AP: No. 22
- Record: 23–9 (11–7 Big Ten)
- Head coach: Robyn Fralick (3rd season)
- Associate head coach: Kim Cameron
- Assistant coaches: Maria Kasza; Bianca Smith
- Home arena: Breslin Center

2025–26 Big Ten women's basketball standings
	Conf.				Overall
Team	W		L	PCT	W		L	PCT
No. 1 UCLA †	18	–	0	1.000	37	–	1	.974
No. 7 Michigan	15	–	3	.833	28	–	7	.800
No. 16 Iowa	15	–	3	.833	27	–	7	.794
No. 17 Ohio State	13	–	5	.722	27	–	8	.771
No. 15 Minnesota	13	–	5	.722	24	–	9	.727
No. 20 Maryland	11	–	7	.611	24	–	9	.727
No. 22 Michigan State	11	–	7	.611	23	–	9	.719
No. 25 Washington	10	–	8	.556	22	–	11	.667
USC	9	–	9	.500	18	–	14	.563
Illinois	9	–	9	.500	22	–	12	.647
Oregon	8	–	10	.444	23	–	13	.639
Nebraska	7	–	11	.389	19	–	13	.594
Indiana	6	–	12	.333	18	–	14	.563
Purdue	5	–	13	.278	13	–	17	.433
Wisconsin	5	–	13	.278	16	–	18	.471
Penn State	4	–	14	.222	11	–	18	.379
Northwestern	2	–	16	.111	8	–	21	.276
Rutgers	1	–	17	.056	9	–	20	.310
† 2026 Big Ten tournament winner Rankings from AP poll

The 2025–26 Michigan State Spartans women's basketball team represents Michigan State University during the 2025–26 NCAA Division I women's basketball season. The Spartans are led by third-year head coach Robyn Fralick and play their home games at the Breslin Center in East Lansing, Michigan as members of the Big Ten Conference.

In the season opening 125–39 win against Mercyhurst, the Spartans set a school record for most points scored in a game and largest margin of victory.

== Previous season ==
The Spartans finished the 2024–25 season 22–10, 11–7 in Big Ten play to finish in a three-way tie for fifth place. As the No. 6 seed in the Big Ten tournament, they lost to Iowa in the second round. They received an at-large bid to the NCAA tournament as the No. 7 seed in the Spokane 1 region. They defeated Harvard in the first round before losing to NC State in the second round.

== Offseason ==
=== Departures ===
Michigan State departures
Name	Num	Pos.	Height	Year	Hometown	Reason for Departure
Sinai Douglas	0	G	5'4"	Freshman	Toledo, OH	Transferred to Florida Gulf Coast
Jaddan Simmons	1	G	5'9"	Graduate Student	Houston, TX	Graduated
Helen Holley	10	F	6'1"	Freshman	Cleveland, OH	Walk-on; transferred to San Diego
Jocelyn Tate	11	G/F	5'10"	Senior	Pickerington, OH	Graduated
Mary Meng	21	C	6'5"	(redshirt) Freshman	Grafton, OH	Transferred to Yale
Nyla Hampton	22	G	5'7"	Graduate Student	Huber Heights, OH	Graduated
Julia Ayrault	40	G	6'2"	Graduate Student	Grosse Pointe, MI	Graduated/went undrafted in 2025 WNBA draft; signed with the Phoenix Mercury

=== Incoming transfers ===
Michigan State incoming transfers
Name	Num	Pos.	Height	Year	Hometown	Previous School
Rashunda Jones	2	G	5'8"	Junior	South Bend, IN	Purdue
Jalyn Brown	23	G	6'0"	Senior	Baltimore, MD	Arizona State
Marah Dykstra	32	F	6'2"	Senior	Vancouver, BC	Montana State
Sara Sambolić	9	G	5'7"	Junior	Ljubljana, Slovenia	University of Ljubljana

=== Recruiting classes ===
==== 2025 recruiting class ====
College recruiting information
Name	Hometown	School	Height	Weight	Commit date
Jordan Ode; G	Maple Grove, MN	Maple Grove High School	5 ft 11 in (1.80 m)	N/A	
Jordan Ode; G	Recruit ratings: ESPN: (95)				
Amy Terrian; PG	Pewaukee, WI	Pewaukee High School	5 ft 8 in (1.73 m)	N/A	
Amy Terrian; PG	Recruit ratings: ESPN: (91)				
Anna Terrian; PG	Pewaukee, WI	Pewaukee High School	5 ft 8 in (1.73 m)	N/A	
Anna Terrian; PG	Recruit ratings: ESPN: (91)				
Overall recruit ranking:
Note: In many cases, Scout, Rivals, 247Sports, On3, and ESPN may conflict in their listings of height and weight.; In these cases, the average was taken. ESPN grades are on a 100-point scale.; Sources: "2025 Player Commits". ESPN. Archived from the original on November 6, 2024.

==== 2026 recruiting class ====
College recruiting information (2026)
Name	Hometown	School	Height	Weight	Commit date
Lilly Williams; P	Farmington Hills, MI	Homeschool	6 ft 5 in (1.96 m)	N/A	
Lilly Williams; P	Recruit ratings: ESPN: (95)				
Overall recruit ranking:
Note: In many cases, Scout, Rivals, 247Sports, On3, and ESPN may conflict in their listings of height and weight.; In these cases, the average was taken. ESPN grades are on a 100-point scale.; Sources: "2026 Player Commits". ESPN. Archived from the original on November 6, 2024.

== Roster ==
2025–26 Michigan State Spartans women's basketball team
Players
Coaches

Pos.	#	Name	Height	Year	Previous school	Hometown
G	0	Jordan Ode	6 ft 0 in (1.83 m)	Fr	Maple Grove	Maple Grove, MN
G	1	Rashunda Jones	5 ft 8 in (1.73 m)	Jr	Purdue	South Bend, IN
G	2	Abbey Kimball	5 ft 10 in (1.78 m)	Sr	West Catholic	Grand Rapids, MI
G	4	Theryn Hallock	5 ft 10 in (1.78 m)	Sr	Forest Hills Central	Grand Rapids, MI
G	5	Emma Shumate	6 ft 1 in (1.85 m)	RS Sr	Ohio State	Dresden, OH
G	9	Sara Sambolić	5 ft 7 in (1.7 m)	Jr		Ljubljana, Slovenia
C	10	Inés Sotelo	6 ft 3 in (1.91 m)	So	Duran Maquinaria Ensino	Ourense, Spain
F	12	Isaline Alexander	6 ft 3 in (1.91 m)	RS Sr	Bill Crothers Secondary	Keswick, ON
F	14	Grace VanSlooten	6 ft 3 in (1.91 m)	Sr	Oregon	Toledo, OH
G	23	Jalyn Brown	6 ft 0 in (1.83 m)	Sr	Arizona State	Baltimore, MD
G	24	Amy Terrian	6 ft 2 in (1.88 m)	Fr	Pewaukee	Pewaukee, WI
G	25	Anna Terrian	6 ft 2 in (1.88 m)	Fr	Pewaukee	Pewaukee, WI
F	32	Marah Dykstra	6 ft 2 in (1.88 m)	Sr	Montana State	Vancouver, BC
F	33	Juliann Woodard	6 ft 0 in (1.83 m)	So	Jennings County	North Vernon, IN
G	35	Kennedy Blair	5 ft 9 in (1.75 m)	RS So	Divine Child	Dearborn, MI

Head coach

- Robyn Fralick (Davidson)

Assistant coach(es)

- Kim Cameron (Michigan Tech)
- Maria Kasza (Michigan Tech)
- Marwan Miller (Franklin)

Legend

- (C) Team captain
- (S) Suspended
- (I) Ineligible
- (W) Walk-on
- Injured
- Current redshirt

Roster

== Schedule and results ==
Date time, TV	Rank^{#}	Opponent^{#}	Result	Record	High points	High rebounds	High assists	Site (attendance) city, state
Exhibition
October 22, 2025*; 6:30 p.m., B1G+	No. 23	Michigan Tech	W 101–58		22 – Vanslooten	10 – Dykstra	7 – Jones	Breslin Center (2,578); East Lansing, MI
Regular season
November 4, 2025*; 6:30 p.m., B1G+	No. 23	Mercyhurst	W 125–39	1–0	19 – Hallock	8 – Brown	12 – Blair	Breslin Center (2,804); East Lansing, MI
November 9, 2025*; 2:00 p.m., B1G+	No. 23	Eastern Michigan	W 92–60	2–0	15 – Tied	6 – VanSlooten	5 – Jones	Breslin Center (3,276); East Lansing, MI
November 12, 2025*; 6:30 p.m., B1G+	No. 24	Youngstown State	W 96–52	3–0	17 – VanSlooten	6 – VanSlooten	7 – Jones	Breslin Center (2,542); East Lansing, MI
November 16, 2025*; 2:00 p.m., B1G+	No. 24	Western Michigan	W 98–44	4–0	19 – VanSlooten	8 – Tied	8 – Blair	Breslin Center (3,653); East Lansing, MI
November 20, 2025*; 6:30 p.m., B1G+	No. 22	Eastern Illinois	W 101–53	5–0	17 – Tied	15 – Blair	6 – Jones	Breslin Center (2,756); East Lansing, MI
November 23, 2025*; 2:00 p.m., B1G+	No. 22	Oakland	W 102–41	6–0	25 – Blair	6 – Tied	8 – Jones	Breslin Center (4,251); East Lansing, MI
November 28, 2025*; 4:00 p.m., FloHoops	No. 20	vs. Temple; Nassau Championship Junkanoo Division Semifinals	W 85–50	7–0	18 – Jones	10 – VanSlooten	6 – Blair	Baha Mar Convention Center (267); Nassau, The Bahamas
November 30, 2025*; 6:30 p.m., FloHoops	No. 20	vs. Clemson; Nassau Championship Junkanoo Division Championship	W 72–64	8–0	22 – Blair	12 – Blair	5 – Blair	Baha Mar Convention Center (257); Nassau, The Bahamas
December 7, 2025; 6:00 p.m., BTN	No. 20	at Wisconsin	L 64–78	8–1 (0–1)	16 – Blair	7 – Tied	7 – Blair	Kohl Center (3,039); Madison, WI
December 14, 2025*; 5:30 p.m., FS1	No. 25	at DePaul	W 90–46	9–1	16 – Blair	7 – Tied	5 – Blair	Wintrust Arena (2,076); Chicago, IL
December 21, 2025*; 3:00 p.m., AWSN	No. 24	vs. Indiana State; Cherokee Invitational semifinals	W 115–66	10–1	22 – Shumate	10 – Blair	7 – Blair	Harrah's Cherokee (1,112); Cherokee, NC
December 22, 2025*; 7:30 p.m., AWSN	No. 24	vs. No. 15 Ole Miss; Cherokee Invitational championship game	W 66–49	11–1	16 – VanSlooten	10 – VanSlooten	3 – VanSlooten	Harrah's Cherokee (350); Cherokee, NC
December 28, 2025; 2:00 p.m., B1G+	No. 24	Rutgers	W 70–64	12–1 (1–1)	14 – Jones	11 – Blair	6 – Blair	Breslin Center (5,034); East Lansing, MI
January 1, 2026; 12:00 p.m., BTN	No. 24	at Indiana	W 80–60	13–1 (2–1)	20 – Brown	14 – VanSlooten	5 – Blair	Simon Skjodt Assembly Hall (7,892); Bloomington, IN
January 4, 2026; 12:00 p.m., BTN	No. 24	Illinois	W 81–75	14–1 (3–1)	19 – Blair	9 – Tied	7 – Blair	Breslin Center (5,114); East Lansing, MI
January 8, 2026; 9:00 p.m., B1G+	No. 15	at No. 23 Washington	W 82–67	15–1 (4–1)	21 – Blair	10 – Jones	5 – Blair	Alaska Airlines Arena (2,858); Seattle, WA
January 11, 2026; 5:00 p.m., B1G+	No. 15	at Oregon	W 85–81	16–1 (5–1)	23 – Jones	10 – VanSlooten	4 – Blair	Matthew Knight Arena (6,313); Eugene, OR
January 15, 2026; 7:00 p.m., BTN	No. 15	No. 24 Nebraska	W 73–71	17–1 (6–1)	22 – VanSlooten	6 – Blair	6 – Blair	Breslin Center (4,273); East Lansing, MI
January 18, 2026; 8:00 p.m., BTN	No. 15	at No. 11 Iowa	L 68–75	17–2 (6–2)	17 – VanSlooten	7 – VanSlooten	3 – Blair	Carver–Hawkeye Arena (14,988); Iowa, City, IA
January 22, 2026; 8:00 p.m., BTN	No. 13	USC	W 74–68	18–2 (7–2)	21 – Blair	9 – VanSlooten	3 – VanSlooten	Breslin Center (4,123); East Lansing, MI
January 29, 2026; 6:00 p.m., BTN	No. 13	at Purdue	W 86–65	19–2 (8–2)	17 – VanSlooten	8 – Tied	7 – Blair	Mackey Arena (3,610); West Lafayette, IN
February 1, 2026; 12:00 p.m., FS1	No. 13	No. 9 Michigan; Rivalry	L 91–94 ^{OT}	19–3 (8–3)	21 – Tied	10 – Blair	6 – Jones	Breslin Center (11,635); East Lansing, MI
February 4, 2026; 6:30 p.m., B1G+	No. 12	No. 22 Maryland	L 70–86	19–4 (8–4)	19 – VanSlooten	9 – VanSlooten	7 – Blair	Breslin Center (3,423); East Lansing, MI
February 7, 2026; 1:00 p.m., B1G+	No. 12	at Penn State	W 81–70	20–4 (9–4)	20 – VanSlooten	14 – VanSlooten	5 – Jones	Rec Hall (2,011); State College, PA
February 11, 2026; 8:00 p.m., Peacock	No. 13	No. 2 UCLA	L 63–86	20–5 (9–5)	15 – Jones	6 – VanSlooten	6 – Blair	Breslin Center (3,517); East Lansing, MI
February 15, 2026; 4:00 p.m., FS1	No. 13	at No. 7 Michigan; Rivalry	L 65–86	20–6 (9–6)	21 – Blair	12 – Blair	3 – Jones	Crisler Arena (11,627); Ann Arbor, MI
February 18, 2026; 6:30 p.m., B1G+	No. 18	Northwestern	W 104–68	21–6 (10–6)	22 – VanSlooten	9 – Sotelo	10 – Blair	Breslin Center (3,014); East Lansing, MI
February 22, 2026; 6:00 p.m., FS1	No. 18	at No. 23 Minnesota	W 75–61	22–6 (11–6)	20 – Brown	6 – Blair	6 – Blair	Williams Arena (7,088); Minneapolis, MN
March 1, 2026; 12:00 p.m., BTN	No. 15	No. 13 Ohio State	L 68–87	22–7 (11–7)	17 – VanSlooten	7 – VanSlooten	5 – VanSlooten	Breslin Center (6,214); East Lansing, MI
Big Ten tournament
March 5, 2026; 6:30 p.m., BTN	(7) No. 18	vs. (10) Illinois; Second Round	L 69–71	22–8	30 – Blair	9 – VanSlooten	5 – Blair	Gainbridge Fieldhouse; Indianapolis, IN
NCAA tournament
March 20, 2026*; 7:30 p.m., ESPNews	(5 S4) No. 20	vs. (12 S4) Colorado State; First Round	W 65–62	23–8	18 – Tied	10 – VanSlooten	2 – Tied	Lloyd Noble Center; Norman, OK
March 22, 2026*; 8:00 p.m., ESPN	(5 S4) No. 20	at (4 S4) No. 10 Oklahoma; Second Round	L 71–77	23–9	20 – Jones	9 – Blair	3 – Blair	Lloyd Noble Center (6,573); Norman, OK
*Non-conference game. ^{#}Rankings from AP Poll. (#) Tournament seedings in parentheses. Sacramento 4=S4. All times are in Eastern Time.

== Rankings ==
Ranking movements Legend: ██ Increase in ranking ██ Decrease in ranking RV = Received votes т = Tied with team above or below
	Week																				
Poll	Pre	1	2	3	4	5	6	7	8	9	10	11	12	13	14	15	16	17	18	19	Final
AP	23	24	22	20	20	25	24	24	24*	15	15	13	13	12	13	18	15	18	20	20	22
Coaches	RV	24	25	21	20	24	23	21т	19	15	14	15	13	13	13	16	15	17	18	18	20

*AP did not release a week 8 poll.

== See also ==
- 2025–26 Michigan State Spartans men's basketball team
