= Whitehall, Pennsylvania =

Whitehall, Pennsylvania may refer to:

- Whitehall, Adams County, Pennsylvania in Adams County, Pennsylvania
- Whitehall, Allegheny County, Pennsylvania
- Whitehall Township, Pennsylvania
- Whitehall Borough, Pennsylvania, a defunct borough now part of the city of Philadelphia
