= Rae Drake =

American football player and coach (1926–2013)

Biographical details
- Born: September 8, 1926; Stambaugh, Michigan, U.S.
- Died: December 12, 2013 (aged 87); Crystal Falls, Michigan, U.S.
- Education: Northern Michigan; Michigan State

Coaching career (HC unless noted)
- 1955–1965: Kingsford HS (MI)
- 1966–1970: Northern Michigan (DC)
- 1971–1973: Northern Michigan

Head coaching record
- Overall: 11–18–1 (college); 77–29 (high school)

Rae Drake Sr. (September 8, 1926 – December 12, 2013) was an American football player and coach. He was the head football coach at Northern Michigan University from 1971 to 1973, compiling a record of 11–18–1. Before Northern Michigan, Drake was a high school football coach at Kingsford, Michigan for 11 years.

== Head coaching record ==
=== College ===
Year	Team	Overall	Conference	Standing	Bowl/playoffs
Northern Michigan Wildcats (NCAA College Division / Division II independent) (1971–1973)
1971	Northern Michigan	7–3			
1972	Northern Michigan	2–8			
1973	Northern Michigan	2–7–1			
Northern Michigan:		11–18–1			
Total:		11–18–1			
