= Lake Superior State Lakers =

Intercollegiate sports teams of Lake Superior State University

- University: Lake Superior State University
- NCAA: Division II
- Conference: Great Lakes Intercollegiate Athletic Conference; Central Collegiate Hockey Association
- Athletic director: Tory Lindley
- Location: Sault Ste. Marie, Michigan
- Varsity teams: 12
- Basketball arena: Bud Cooper Gymnasium
- Ice hockey arena: Taffy Abel Arena
- Other venues: Norris Center Complex
- Nickname: Lakers
- Colors: Royal blue and gold
- Website: lssulakers.com
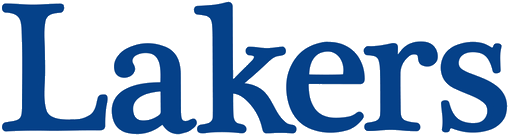

The Lake Superior State Lakers (LSSU Lakers) are the athletic teams that represent the Lake Superior State University, located in Sault Ste. Marie, Michigan, in NCAA Division II intercollegiate sporting competitions. The Lakers compete as members of the Great Lakes Intercollegiate Athletic Conference for 12 of 13 varsity sports, with the men's hockey team (the only team that competes at the Division I level) playing in the Central Collegiate Hockey Association. The Lakers have been members of the GLIAC since 1972.

== Sports sponsored ==
Men's sports	Women's sports
Basketball	Basketball
Cross country	Cross country
Golf	Golf
Ice hockey	Tennis
Tennis	Track and field^{1}
Track and field^{1}	Volleyball
^{1} – includes both indoor and outdoor

=== Men's basketball ===
The LSSU men's basketball team captured the 1976, 1978, 1996, 2014 and 2015 GLIAC regular season titles. In 1996 they also won the GLIAC tournament championship along with an NCAA tournament berth. In 2009, 2014 and 2015, the men's team captured the GLIAC North Division Championship along with an NCAA tournament berth.

=== Women's basketball ===
LSSU's women's basketball team found success in the early part of the decade. They were the 2002, 2003, 2004 and 2005 GLIAC North Division regular season champions. The LSSU women's basketball team also took home the GLIAC conference tournament championship in 2003 and 2004.

=== Ice hockey ===
The Lakers have appeared in 10 NCAA Division I ice hockey tournaments and won three national championships (1988, 1992, and 1994) at that level. LSSU also won two men's NAIA national championships in 1972 and 1974 while playing in that association. The Lakers have taken the CCHA regular season title four times (1974, 1988, 1991, and 1996) and have also won the CCHA conference tournament four times (1991, 1992, 1993, and 1995). Many of these teams' players have gone on to play professionally in the NHL and other professional leagues. LSSU also has a Division III club hockey team, which plays in the American Collegiate Hockey Association.The Taffy Abel Arena where the Lakers' play is named after Clearance "Taffy" Abel. It is named after him because when the University got the donation to renovate the arena from the Sault Tribe of Chippewa Indians, it was in the contract that they would get to name the arena. They chose Taffy Abel because he is from Sault Ste. Marie, Mich., a legendary hockey star, and a Native American.

Ice Hockey National Championships

1972 NAIA Tournament Results
Round	Opponent	Score
Final Four	Wisconsin-Superior	12-2
Championship	Gustavus Adolphus	9-3

1974 NAIA Tournament Results
Round	Opponent	Score
Round 1	Concordia College	7-1
Final Four	St. Thomas	9-2
Championship	Bemidji State	4-1

1988 NCAA Tournament Results
Round	Opponent	Score
Round 1 (Game 1)	Merrimack	3-4
Round 1 (Game 2)	Merrimack	5-0
Frozen Four	Maine	6-3
Championship	St. Lawrence	4-3 (OT)

1992 NCAA Tournament Results
Round	Opponent	Score
Quarterfinals	Alaska Anchorage	7-3
Semifinals	Minnesota	8-3
Frozen Four	Michigan State	4-2
Championship	Wisconsin	5-3

1994 NCAA Tournament Results
Round	Opponent	Score
Quarterfinals	Northeastern	6-5 (OT)
Semifinals	Michigan	5-4 (OT)
Final Four	Harvard	3-2 (OT)
Championship	Boston University	9-1

LSSU has also been national runners-up four times on the national stage in ice hockey. LSSU finished second in the 1968, 1969 and 1970 NAIA national championships and lost 5-4 to Maine in the 1993 NCAA ice hockey national championship.

=== Running ===
LSSU is home to a cross country and track & field program.

=== Tennis ===
LSSU is home to men's and women's tennis teams. In 2004 and 2006, LSSU's men's tennis teams qualified for the NCAA Division II National Championships for the first and second time in school history. In 2006 and 2007 LSSU's women's tennis teams qualified for the NCAA Division II National Championships for the first and second time in school history.

== Former teams ==
=== Football ===
LSSU briefly fielded a football team from 1948 to 1950 when the university was known as Sault Tech.

=== Rugby ===
LSSU also briefly fielded a club men's rugby team, 'The Black Sheep', from 2006 to 2009. Despite enthusiasm among students, the team folded due to lack of support from the administration.
