= Lake Superior State Lakers cross country =

Lake Superior State Lakers
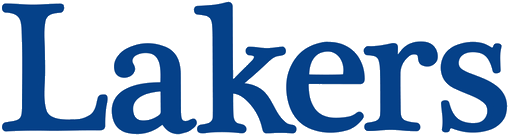
- University: Lake Superior State University
- Head coach: Matt Smith
- Location: Sault Ste. Marie, Michigan
- Colors: Royal blue and gold

The Lake Superior State Lakers cross country team is a National Collegiate Athletic Association (NCAA) Division II college running program that represents Lake Superior State University. The Lakers are a member of the Great Lakes Intercollegiate Athletic Conference (GLIAC).

Steve Eles has been the head coach since the mid-2000s. Prior to his coaching career at LSSU, he was an assistant coach at Tiffin University and a runner at LSSU.

Taking over in 2017, Rob Gallinger is the current head coach for LSSU Cross Country.

LSSU reached its successful peak in the late 90s and early 2000s. Recently, the Lakers have finished 10th in the GLIAC respectively for the past two years.

As of the 2020 season, the Lakers have had continuous improvement since the installation of Rob Gallinger as head coach, as David Mitter qualified for NCAA DII Nationals in 2018, and just missed out in 2019.

The 2020 season was cancelled because of COVID-19.

In the winter of 2021/2022, Anthony Filipek was hired as the head coach of Lake Superior State Cross Country/Track and Field. As of Fall 2023, he is still the head coach of the lakers.
