= Ashland Eagles =

College sport team in Ohio

- University: Ashland University
- Conference: G-MAC
- NCAA: Division II
- Athletic director: Al King
- Location: Ashland, Ohio
- Varsity teams: 22 (11 men's, 11 women's)
- Football stadium: Jack Miller Stadium
- Basketball arena: Kates Gymnasium
- Baseball stadium: Tomassi Stadium and Donges Field at the Archer Ballpark Complex
- Softball stadium: Deb Miller Field at the Archer Ballpark Complex
- Soccer stadium: Ferguson Field
- Aquatics center: Messerly Natatorium
- Lacrosse stadium: Ferguson Field
- Indoor track and field venue: Niss Athletic Center
- Outdoor track and field venue: Ferguson Field
- Nickname: Eagles
- Colors: Purple and gold
- Website: goashlandeagles.com
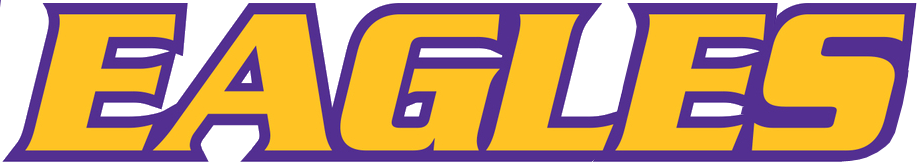

Team NCAA championships
- 8

The Ashland Eagles are the athletic teams that represent Ashland University, located in Ashland, Ohio, in Division II intercollegiate sports of the National Collegiate Athletic Association (NCAA). The Eagles are members of the Great Midwest Athletic Conference (G-MAC).

They previously had competed in the Great Lakes Intercollegiate Athletic Conference (GLIAC) from 1995–96 to 2020–21, in the Heartland Collegiate Conference from 1978–79 to 1989–90, and concurrently in the Great Lakes Valley Conference from 1978–79 to 1994–95. Prior to joining the NCAA, Ashland belonged to the Mid-Ohio League (later the American Mideast Conference) of the National Association of Intercollegiate Athletics (NAIA) from 1949–50 to 1965–66, and the Ohio Athletic Conference (OAC) from 1931–32 to 1947–48.

The university's $23 million athletic complex features a 5,200-seat football stadium, a 1,000-seat stadium for track & field and soccer, and a state-of-the-art training facility. The Niss Athletic Center, which broke ground in 2020, will feature an 80-yard turf field, a 300-meter six-lane track and an eight-lane sprint track, as well as field jump and throwing areas and batting cages.

== Varsity teams ==
Men's sports	Women's sports
Baseball	Basketball
Basketball	Cross country
Cross country	Esports
Esports	Golf
Football	Lacrosse
Golf	Soccer
Soccer	Softball
Swimming	Swimming
Tennis	Tennis
Track and field	Track and field
Wrestling	Volleyball

== National championships ==
=== Team ===
Sport	Assoc.	Division	Year	Coach	Score	Rival	Location	Ref.
Basketball (women's)	NCAA	Division II	2013	Sue Ramsey	71–56	Dowling	San Antonio, TX	
Basketball (women's)	NCAA	Division II	2017	Robyn Fralick	93–77	Virginia Union	Columbus, OH	
Basketball (women's)	NCAA	Division II	2023	Kari Pickens	78–67	Minnesota Duluth	Dallas, TX	
Cross country (men's)	NCAA	Division III	1973	Paul Armor	66–172	Albany (NY) / North Central (IL)	Wheaton, IL	
Track and field (men's) (Note: Inddor track.)	NCAA	Division II	2019	Jud Logan	38–37	Adams State	Pittsburg, KS	
Track and field (men's)	NCAA	Division II	2021	Jud Logan	70–53	Grand Valley State	Birmingham, AL	
Track and field (men's)	NCAA	Division III	1974	Paul Armor	61–48	Southern–New Orleans	Eastern Illinois	
Track and field (men's)	NCAA	Division II	2019	Jud Logan	54–53	Angelo State	Kingsville, TX	

== Accomplishments ==
- In the winter of 2016–17, the Eagle women's basketball team won its second NCAA Division II national championship, and became the first D-II women's hoops team to finish a season at 37–0. In addition, the men's indoor track and field team finished second in the country and saw sophomore Myles Pringle win a national title in the 400-meter dash, and the wrestling team placed sixth as a team at nationals and had its own national champion in 133-pound senior Michael Labry.
- In 2014–15, Ashland's athletic department finished second in the final Division II Learfield Sports Directors’ Cup standings, its highest finish all-time. It also ends a run for AU of eight consecutive athletic seasons in which it finished in the top 10 in the Directors’ Cup.
- 2012 was the fifth year in school history that the Ashland University Eagles football team took a trip to the postseason, the third under Coach Lee Owens. This was Ashland University's highest ranking since becoming an NCAA Division II institution. 2012 also produced the first GLIAC football championship in school history. This is only the second team in school history to win 10 or more games in a season. This team was only the fourth at Ashland to end the regular season without a loss. The Eagles record in 2012 was 11–1.
- 2013 proved to be one of Ashland University's strongest years in athletics. Ten Ashland University Eagles became national champions between swimming and indoor track and field. The first national champions were seniors Julie Widmann and Rachel Ausdenmoore, junior Gaby Verdugo-Arzaluz and freshman Kaylyn Murphy who won the women's 200-yard freestyle relay at the national swim meet March 7, 2013. Widmann has won four national titles (3 relays, 1 individual). For track and field Richard Quick won a national title in the weight throw, 68-feet, 3.25-inches. Katie Nageotte also won a national title in pole-vault, 13-feet, 11.25-inches. The next set of national champions were the track 1600-meter relay team (Sophomore: Drew Windle, Senior: Cory Lamar, Junior: Jacob Cook, and Junior Keith Cleveland). Drew Windle also won a second national championship in the 800 meter run with a time of 1:48.75.
- 2013 was the first year in school history for an Ashland University Team to win a national championship. The Eagles Women's Basketball team had a 71–56 victory against Dowling College in the NCAA Division II national championship game. Ashland University is the second GLIAC team to win a women's basketball Division II national championship. Kari Daugherty was selected as the 2013 Women's Division II Bulletin player of the year, as well as the most outstanding player. Daugherty is the first Ashland University player to receive the Bulletin's player of the year award.
- 2013: This year AU also had Basketball's Kari Daugherty receive the NCAA II player of the year award for the second year in a row, and Track and Field's Drew Windle awarded the men's indoor track and field athlete of the year. 27 Ashland University Student-Athletes were recognized as All-Americans for the winter sports season.
