= Ivy League women's basketball tournament =

US sports championship

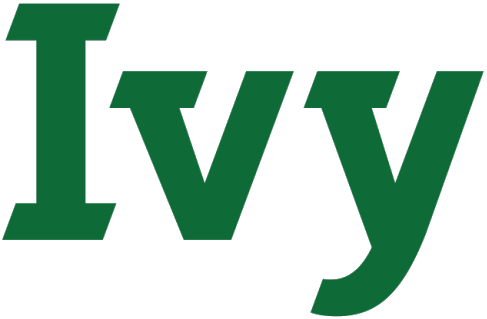
- Sport: College basketball
- Conference: Ivy League
- Number of teams: 4
- Format: Single-elimination tournament
- Current stadium: Newman Arena (2026)
- Current location: Ithaca, NY (2026)
- Played: 2017–2019, 2022–present
- Last contest: 2026
- Current champion: Princeton (6th)
- Most championships: Princeton (6)

Host stadiums
- The Palestra (2017–2018); John J. Lee Amphitheater (2019); Lavietes Pavilion (2022); Jadwin Gymnasium (2023); Levien Gymnasium (2024); Pizzitola Sports Center (2025); Newman Arena (2026)

Host locations
- Philadelphia, PA (2017–2018); New Haven, CT (2019); Boston, MA (2022); Princeton, NJ (2023); New York, NY (2024); Providence, RI (2025); Ithaca, NY (2026)

The Ivy League women's basketball tournament is the conference tournament in basketball for the Ivy League, and is held alongside the Ivy League men's tournament at the same venue. The overall event is currently marketed as Ivy Madness. As with the men's tournament, the women's event is a single-elimination tournament involving the top four schools in the standings. The tournament format consists of two semifinal games on the first day (Friday), with the No. 1 seed playing the No. 4 seed and the No. 2 seed playing the No. 3 seed, followed by the championship game played the next day (Saturday). The tournament winner receives the League's automatic bids to the NCAA Division I women's basketball tournament. The teams that finish with the best records from the 14-game, regular-season conference schedule continue to be recognized as Ivy League champions.

Unlike the men's Ivy tournament, in which the regular-season champion receives an automatic berth in the National Invitation Tournament should it fail to win the conference tournament, a women's regular-season champion is technically not guaranteed a postseason berth if it does not make the NCAA tournament. However, the Women's National Invitation Tournament has a standing policy of inviting the top available team from each NCAA Division I conference once the NCAA women's tournament field has been set. (This difference is because unlike the men's NIT, the WNIT is neither owned nor operated by the NCAA.)

Prior to the formal tournament, the Ivy League used a one-game playoff if necessary to break ties eight times with two teams, and in 2001-02, a three-team tournament, in order to settle the conference championship.

The first two tournaments in 2017 and 2018 were held at the Palestra on the campus of the University of Pennsylvania. The 2019 event was held at John J. Lee Amphitheater, a venue located within Yale University's Payne Whitney Gymnasium. In 2019, the Ivy League announced that the men's and women's tournaments would rotate among the remaining conference members through 2025. Due to COVID-19 disruptions, the 2020 tournament was canceled, and the Ivy League did not play a 2020–21 season. The tournament resumed in 2022, with all venues shifted forward by two years.

== Champions ==
Year	Champion	Score	Runner-up	Tournament MVP (Note: Unless otherwise noted, all played for the tournament champion.)	Location
2017	Penn	57–49	Princeton	Michelle Nwokedi	Palestra (Philadelphia, PA)
2018	Princeton	63–34	Penn	Bella Alarie	Palestra (Philadelphia, PA)
2019	Princeton	65–54	Penn	Bella Alarie	John J. Lee Amphitheater (New Haven, CT)
2020	Not held due to COVID-19				
2021	Not held due to COVID-19				
2022	Princeton	77–59	Columbia	Kaitlyn Chen	Lavietes Pavilion (Boston, MA)
2023	Princeton	54–48	Harvard	Kaitlyn Chen	Jadwin Gymnasium (Princeton, NJ)
2024	Princeton	75–58	Columbia	Kaitlyn Chen	Levien Gymnasium (New York, NY)
2025	Harvard	74-71	Columbia	Harmoni Turner	Pizzitola Sports Center (Providence, RI)
2026	Princeton	63-53	Harvard	Fadima Tall	Newman Arena (Ithaca, NY)

== Tournament championships by school ==
School	Championships	Championship Years
Princeton	6	2018, 2019, 2022, 2023, 2024, 2026
Penn	1	2017
Harvard	1	2025

== Tournament appearances by school ==
Team	Bids	Years
Princeton	8	2017, 2018, 2019, 2022, 2023, 2024, 2025, 2026
Harvard	8	2017, 2018, 2019, 2022, 2023, 2024, 2025, 2026
Penn	6	2017, 2018, 2019, 2023, 2024, 2025
Columbia	5	2022, 2023, 2024, 2025, 2026
Yale	2	2018, 2022
Brown	1	2017
Cornell	1	2019
Dartmouth	0	-

== List of regular season champions ==
Since 1974, the Ivy League has had regular season titles for women's basketball.

- 1974–75: Princeton
- 1975–76: Princeton
- 1976–77: Princeton
- 1977–78: Princeton
- 1978–79: Yale
- 1979–80: Dartmouth
- 1980–81: Dartmouth
- 1981–82: Dartmouth
- 1982–83: Dartmouth
- 1983–84: Brown
- 1984–85: Brown & Princeton
- 1985–86: Dartmouth & Harvard
- 1986–87: Dartmouth
- 1987–88: Dartmouth & Harvard
- 1988–89: Dartmouth
- 1989–90: Dartmouth
- 1990–91: Harvard
- 1991–92: Brown
- 1992–93: Brown
- 1993–94: Brown & Dartmouth
- 1994–95: Dartmouth
- 1995–96: Harvard
- 1996–97: Harvard
- 1997–98: Harvard
- 1998–99: Dartmouth & Princeton
- 1999–00: Dartmouth
- 2000–01: Penn
- 2001–02: Harvard
- 2002–03: Harvard
- 2003–04: Penn
- 2004–05: Dartmouth &Harvard
- 2005–06: Brown, Dartmouth & Princeton
- 2006–07: Harvard
- 2007–08: Cornell, Dartmouth & Harvard
- 2008–09: Dartmouth
- 2009–10: Princeton
- 2010–11: Princeton
- 2011–12: Princeton
- 2012–13: Princeton
- 2013–14: Penn
- 2014–15: Princeton
- 2015–16: Penn
- 2016–17: Penn
- 2017–18: Princeton
- 2018–19: Penn & Princeton
- 2019–20: Princeton
- 2021–22: Princeton
- 2022–23: Columbia & Princeton
- 2023–24: Columbia & Princeton
- 2024-25: Columbia
- 2025-26: Princeton
