= 2025–26 Columbia Lions women's basketball team =

Intercollegiate basketball season

2025–26 Columbia Lions women's basketball

WBIT Champions
- Conference: Ivy League
- Record: 25–8 (11–3 Ivy)
- Head coach: Megan Griffith (10th season)
- Assistant coaches: Tyler Cordell; Allie Bassetti; Kizmahr Grell
- Home arena: Levien Gymnasium

2025–26 Ivy League women's basketball standings
	Conf.				Overall
Team	W		L	PCT	W		L	PCT
No. 23 Princeton †	12	–	2	.857	26	–	4	.867
Columbia	11	–	3	.786	25	–	8	.758
Harvard	10	–	4	.714	20	–	12	.625
Brown	8	–	6	.571	16	–	11	.593
Penn	7	–	7	.500	17	–	10	.630
Cornell	4	–	10	.286	9	–	18	.333
Yale	3	–	11	.214	7	–	20	.259
Dartmouth	1	–	13	.071	10	–	17	.370
† 2026 Ivy League tournament winner Rankings from AP Poll

The 2025–26 Columbia Lions women's basketball team represented Columbia University during the 2025–26 NCAA Division I women's basketball season. The Lions, led by tenth-year head coach Megan Griffith, played their home games at Levien Gymnasium in New York City as members of the Ivy League.

== Previous season ==
The Lions finished the 2024–25 season 24–7 and 13–1 in Ivy League play, earning them a bid to the Ivy League tournament as the No. 1 seed. They beat No. 4 Penn in the semifinal game before losing to No. 3 Harvard 71–74 in the championship game.

For the second year in a row and the second time in program history, the Lions earned an at-large bid to the NCAA tournament. As the No. 11 seed in the Birmingham Regional 2, they earned their first ever tournament victory with a 63–60 win over Washington in the First Four before losing to No. 6 West Virginia in the first round.

== Offseason ==
=== Departures ===
Columbia Departures
Name	Num	Pos.	Height	Year	Hometown	Reason for Departure
Cecelia Collins	3	G	6'0"	Senior	Scranton, PA	Graduated
Kitty Henderson	10	G	5'10"	Senior	North Curl Curl, Australia	Graduated
Emily Montes	30	G	5'10"	Sophomore	Miami, FL	TBD (Note: Montes originally appeared on the Lions roster for the 2025–26 season, but no longer appears as of December 2025.)

=== Incoming transfers ===
Columbia incoming transfers
Name	Num	Pos.	Height	Year	Hometown	Previous school
Hilke Feldrappe	23	F	6'3"	Junior	Berlin, Germany	Missouri

=== Recruiting class ===
There was no recruiting class for the class of 2025.

== Roster ==
2025–26 Columbia Lions women's basketball team
Players
Coaches

Pos.	#	Name	Height	Year	Previous school	Hometown
F	0	Susie Rafiu	6 ft 1 in (1.85 m)	Sr	Copleston High School	Ipswich, England
G/F	1	Perri Page	5 ft 11 in (1.8 m)	Sr	Chartiers Valley High School	Pittsburgh, PA
F	2	Alicia Mitchell	6 ft 2 in (1.88 m)	Fr	Loomis Chaffee School	Springfield, MA
F	3	Eirny Erinugha	6 ft 0 in (1.83 m)	Fr	Notre Dame High School	Calgary, Alberta
G	4	Fliss Henderson	5 ft 11 in (1.8 m)	Jr	St Luke's Grammar School	North Curl Curl, Australia
G	5	Mia Broom	5 ft 9 in (1.75 m)	So	Lakeside School	Seattle, WA
G	7	Vasiliki Cholopoulou	5 ft 10 in (1.78 m)	Fr	Fryganiotis Schools	Kozani, Greece
G	11	Nasi Simmons	5 ft 9 in (1.75 m)	So	Noble and Greenough School	Brockton, MA
G	12	Marija Avlijas	5 ft 10 in (1.78 m)	Jr	ŽKK Art Basket; Ole Miss	Belgrade, Serbia
G/F	15	María Arrebola	6 ft 0 in (1.83 m)	So	IES Emilio Prados	Almería, Spain
F/C	21	Marta Jaama	6 ft 2 in (1.88 m)	So	Tallinn Arte Gymnasium	Tallinn, Estonia
G	22	Shay Shippen	5 ft 11 in (1.8 m)	Fr	Skyline High School	Idaho Falls, ID
F	23	Hilke Feldrappe	6 ft 3 in (1.91 m)	Jr	Schul- und Leistungssportzentrum Berlin; Missouri	Berlin, Germany
G	24	Riley Weiss	5 ft 10 in (1.78 m)	Jr	George W. Hewlett High School (NY); North Broward Prep (FL)	Hewlett, NY
G/F	42	Blau Tor	6 ft 0 in (1.83 m)	So	INS Joaquim Blume	Barcelona, Spain

Head coach

- Megan Griffith (Columbia)

Assistant coach(es)

- Tyler Cordell (Ohio Wesleyan)
- Allie Bassetti (Rowan)
- Kizmahr Grell (Dickinson)

Legend

- (C) Team captain
- (S) Suspended
- (I) Ineligible
- (W) Walk-on
- Injured
- Current redshirt

Roster
Last update: November 7, 2025

== Schedule and results ==
Date time, TV	Rank^{#}	Opponent^{#}	Result	Record	High points	High rebounds	High assists	Site (attendance) city, state
Non-conference regular season
November 7, 2025*; 6:00 p.m., ESPN+		at Butler	W 74–69 ^{OT}	1–0	27 – Weiss	10 – Page	4 – Henderson	Hinkle Fieldhouse (893); Indianapolis, IN
November 9, 2025*; 12:00 p.m., ESPN+		at Ohio	W 92–74	2–0	18 – Weiss	10 – Broom	5 – Tied	Convocation Center (565); Athens, OH
November 15, 2025*; 7:00 p.m., ESPN+		Richmond	L 67–77	2–1	16 – Weiss	10 – Rafiu	4 – Henderson	Levien Gymnasium (1,542); New York, NY
November 20, 2025*; 11:00 a.m., ESPN+		Saint Joseph's	L 48–66	2–2	14 – Rafiu	6 – Henderson	3 – Tied	Levien Gymnasium (2,511); New York, NY
November 24, 2025*; 7:00 p.m., SNY		Binghamton	W 73–60	3–2	14 – Rafiu	9 – Page	6 – Avlijas	Levien Gymnasium (735); New York, NY
November 27, 2025*; 1:30 p.m., FloCollege		vs. Kansas State; Cancún Challenge Yucatan Tournament	L 92–95	3–3	30 – Weiss	7 – Rafiu	6 – Avlijas	Hard Rock Hotel Riviera Maya (–); Riviera Maya, Mexico
November 28, 2025*; 1:30 p.m., FloCollege		vs. South Dakota State; Cancún Challenge Yucatan Tournament	W 80–67	4–3	31 – Weiss	6 – Rafiu	3 – Tied	Hard Rock Hotel Riviera Maya (200); Riviera Maya, Mexico
November 29, 2025*; 1:30 p.m., FloCollege		vs. No. 12/10 North Carolina; Cancún Challenge Yucatan Tournament	L 63–80	4–4	21 – Weiss	8 – Tied	5 – Henderson	Hard Rock Hotel Riviera Maya (–); Riviera Maya, Mexico
December 3, 2025*; 7:00 p.m., ESPN+		at Manhattan	W 84–38	5–4	15 – Page	10 – Rafiu	4 – Tied	Draddy Gymnasium (352); Riverdale, NY
December 6, 2025*; 2:00 p.m., ESPN+		Wagner	W 82–42	6–4	16 – Weiss	8 – Henderson	6 – Henderson	Levien Gymnasium (704); New York, NY
December 9, 2025*; 6:00 p.m., ESPN+		at Seton Hall	W 54–53	7–4	15 – Page	10 – Page	3 – Tied	Walsh Gymnasium (1,195); South Orange, NJ
December 20, 2025*; 1:00 p.m., ESPN+		UTSA	W 70–65	8–4	21 – Avlijas	11 – Henderson	5 – Rafiu	Levien Gymnasium (722); New York, NY
December 29, 2025*; 2:00 p.m., ESPN+		at Florida Gulf Coast	W 63–44	9–4	24 – Weiss	7 – Rafiu	4 – Tied	Alico Arena (1,297); Fort Myers, FL
Ivy League regular season
January 3, 2026; 2:00 p.m., ESPN+		Cornell	L 60–67	9–5 (0–1)	24 – Page	16 – Henderson	6 – Henderson	Levien Gymnasium (1,026); New York, NY
January 10, 2026; 2:00 p.m., ESPN+		at Harvard	W 58–55	10–5 (1–1)	24 – Page	12 – Page	6 – Henderson	Lavietes Pavilion (1,636); Cambridge, MA
January 17, 2026; 2:00 p.m., SNY		Yale	W 85−58	11−5 (2–1)	22 – Weiss	8 – Page	5 – Avlijas	Levien Gymnasium (1,176); New York, NY
January 19, 2026; 2:00 p.m., ESPN+		Brown	W 68−52	12−5 (3–1)	15 – Weiss	13 – Henderson	6 – Henderson	Levien Gymnasium (1,605); New York, NY
January 24, 2026; 2:00 p.m., ESPN+		Dartmouth	W 79–69	13–5 (4–1)	29 – Noland	10 – Noland	4 – Sanders	Levien Gymnasium (1,264); New York, NY
January 30, 2026; 6:00 p.m., ESPNU		at No. 19 Princeton	W 73–67	14–5 (5–1)	23 – Page	9 – Henderson	5 – Page	Jadwin Gymnasium (1,424); Princeton, NJ
January 31, 2026; 5:00 p.m., ESPN+		at Penn	L 55–64	14–6 (5–2)	23 – Weiss	7 – Tied	4 – Henderson	The Palestra (762); Philadelphia, PA
February 7, 2026; 1:00 p.m., ESPN+		at Cornell	W 80–55	15–6 (6–2)	38 – Weiss	6 – Tied	6 – Broom	Newman Arena (247); Ithaca, NY
February 13, 2026; 6:00 p.m., ESPNU		No. 24 Princeton	W 70–56	16–6 (7–2)	25 – Page	12 – Henderson	3 – Tied	Levien Gymnasium (2,014); New York, NY
February 14, 2026; 5:00 p.m., ESPN+		Penn	W 69–56	17–6 (8–2)	21 – Weiss	10 – Rafiu	7 – Henderson	Levien Gymnasium (1,612); New York, NY
February 21, 2026; 2:00 p.m., ESPN+		at Dartmouth	W 81–42	18–6 (9–2)	20 – Weiss	7 – Rafiu	7 – Broom	Leede Arena; Hanover, NH
February 27, 2026; 6:00 p.m., ESPN+		at Yale	W 68–47	19–6 (10–2)	26 – Weiss	7 – Broom	4 – Tied	John J. Lee Amphitheater (447); New Haven, CT
February 28, 2026; 5:00 p.m., ESPN+		at Brown	W 59–56	20–6 (11–2)	19 – Weiss	10 – Page	3 – Henderson	Pizzitola Sports Center (354); Providence, RI
March 7, 2026; 2:00 p.m., ESPN+		Harvard	L 64–68	20–7 (11-3)	25 – Page	8 – Page	5 – Henderson	Levien Gymnasium (2,647); New York, NY
Ivy League tournament
March 13, 2026; 7:30 p.m., ESPN+	(2)	vs. (3) Harvard; Semifinals	L 65–67 ^{OT}	20–8	25 – Weiss	7 – Page	6 – Broom	Newman Arena (788); Ithaca, NY
WBIT
March 19, 2026; 7:00 p.m., ESPN+	(4)	St. John's; First Round	W 74–26	21–8	22 – Weiss	10 – Simmons	6 – Broom	Levien Gymnasium (714); New York, NY
March 22, 2026; 2:00 p.m., ESPN+	(4)	at (1) North Dakota State; Second Round	W 86–57	22–8	26 – Broom	8 – Broom	6 – Broom	Scheels Center (1,769); Fargo, ND
March 26, 2026; 10:00 p.m., ESPN+	(4)	at (3) California; Quarterfinals	W 74–68	23–8	24 – Page	9 – Rafiu	4 – Broom	Haas Pavilion (1,113); Berkeley, CA
March 30, 2026; 2:30 p.m., ESPNU	(4)	vs. (3) Wisconsin; Semifinals	W 67–50	24–8	21 – Weiss	9 – Tied	5 – Broom	Charles Koch Arena (13); Wichita, KS
April 1, 2026; 7:00 p.m., ESPN2	(4)	vs. (1) BYU; Championship	W 81–64	25–8	23 – Broom	9 – Feldrappe	4 – Broom	Charles Koch Arena (1,871); Wichita, KS
*Non-conference game. ^{#}Rankings from AP Poll. (#) Tournament seedings in parentheses. All times are in Eastern Time.

== Rankings ==
Ranking movements Legend: ██ Increase in ranking ██ Decrease in ranking — = Not ranked RV = Received votes
	Week																				
Poll	Pre	1	2	3	4	5	6	7	8	9	10	11	12	13	14	15	16	17	18	19	Final
AP	—	—	—	—	—	—	—	—	—	—	—	—	—	—	—	RV	RV	RV			
Coaches	—	—	—	—	—	—	—	—	—	—	—	—	—	—	—	—	—	RV			

== See also ==
- 2025–26 Columbia Lions men's basketball team
