= 2025–26 Yale Bulldogs women's basketball team =

American college basketball season

2025–26 Yale Bulldogs women's basketball
- Conference: Ivy League
- Record: 7–20 (3–11 Ivy)
- Head coach: Dalila Eshe (4th season)
- Assistant coaches: Hannah Early Vaughn; Anna Kim
- Home arena: John J. Lee Amphitheater

2025–26 Ivy League women's basketball standings
	Conf.				Overall
Team	W		L	PCT	W		L	PCT
No. 23 Princeton	12	–	2	.857	24	–	3	.889
Columbia	11	–	3	.786	20	–	7	.741
Harvard	10	–	4	.714	17	–	10	.630
Brown	8	–	6	.571	16	–	10	.615
Penn	7	–	7	.500	17	–	10	.630
Cornell	3	–	10	.231	8	–	18	.308
Yale	3	–	10	.231	7	–	19	.269
Dartmouth	1	–	12	.077	10	–	16	.385
† 2026 Ivy League tournament winner As of February 28, 2026; Rankings from AP Poll

The 2025–26 Yale Bulldogs women's basketball team currently represents Yale University during the 2025–26 NCAA Division I women's basketball season. The Bulldogs, led by fourth-year head coach Dalila Eshe, play their home games at John J. Lee Amphitheater in New Haven, Connecticut as members of the Ivy League.

== Previous season ==
The Bulldogs finished the 2024–25 season 4–23 and 3–11 in Ivy League play to finish in sixth place (tied with Cornell). They failed to qualify for the Ivy League tournament for the third consecutive year.

== Offseason ==
=== Departures ===
Yale Departures
Name	Num	Pos.	Height	Year	Hometown	Reason for Departure
Avery Lee	0	G	5'8"	Senior	Los Altos Hills, CA	Graduated
Abigail Long	2	G	5'7"	Freshman	Mission Hills, KS	TBA
Grace Thybulle	20	F	6'3"	Senior	Irvington, NY	Graduated
Lola Lesmond	23	G	6'0"	Junior	Six-Fours-les-Plages, France	TBA
Mackenzie Egger	24	G/F	6'0"	Senior	Mount Pleasant, MI	Graduated

=== Incoming transfers ===
Yale incoming transfers
Name	Num	Pos.	Height	Year	Hometown	Previous School
Luisa Vydrova	17	F	6'1"	Junior	Prague, Czechia	UTEP
Mary Meng	20	F	6'5"	Junior	Grafton, OH	Michigan State

=== Recruiting class ===
There was no college recruiting class for the class of 2025.

== Roster ==
2025–26 Yale Bulldogs women's basketball team
Players
Coaches

Pos.	#	Name	Height	Year	Previous school	Hometown
G	1	Olivia Kim	5 ft 8 in (1.73 m)	Fr	Broomfield High School	Broomfield, CO
G	1	Ciniya Moore	5 ft 10 in (1.78 m)		IMG Academy	Bradenton, FL
G	3	Hannah Wasserman	5 ft 11 in (1.8 m)	Fr	Scarsdale High School	Scarsdale, NY
G	4	Lucy Lynn	5 ft 7 in (1.7 m)	Jr	Gonzaga Prep	Liberty Lake, WA
G	5	Magdalena Schmidt	5 ft 11 in (1.8 m)	So	BG BRG Gmunden and Ballsportgymnasium Wien	Gmunden, Austria
G	9	Radhika Garapaty	5 ft 9 in (1.75 m)	Fr	Notre Dame High School	Milpitas, CA
G	10	Ke'iara Odume	5 ft 11 in (1.8 m)	So	Loomis Chaffee School	Syracuse, NY
F	11	Ana Guillen	6 ft 0 in (1.83 m)	Jr	Sant Andrew de Nazaret; Wisconsin	Badalona, Spain
F	17	Luisa Vydrova	6 ft 1 in (1.85 m)	Jr	Gymnazium Nad Stolou; UTEP	Prague, Czechia
F	20	Mary Meng	6 ft 5 in (1.96 m)	Jr	Midview High School; Michigan State	Grafton, OH
G	21	Kiley Capstraw	5 ft 11 in (1.8 m)	Sr	West Orange High School	West Orange, NJ
G	22	Marisa Chapman	5 ft 9 in (1.75 m)	So	Storm King School	Middletown, NY
F	32	Dorka Kastl	6 ft 2 in (1.88 m)	Fr	Holderness School	Budapest, Hungary
F	33	Sophia Gibson	6 ft 4 in (1.93 m)	Fr	Notre Dame Academy	Taylor Mill, KY

Head coach

- Dalila Eshe (Florida)

Assistant coach(es)

- Hannah Early Vaughn (Davidson)
- Anna Kim (Long Beach State)

Legend

- (C) Team captain
- (S) Suspended
- (I) Ineligible
- (W) Walk-on
- Injured
- Current redshirt

Roster
Last update: November 7, 2025

== Schedule and results ==
Date time, TV	Rank^{#}	Opponent^{#}	Result	Record	High points	High rebounds	High assists	Site (attendance) city, state
Non-conference regular season
November 7, 2025*; 6:00 p.m., ESPN+		Northeastern	L 64–75	0–1	20 – Moore	9 – Vydrova	4 – Chapman	John J. Lee Amphitheater (383); New Haven, CT
November 11, 2025*; 6:00 p.m., ESPN+		Hofstra	L 66–73	0–2	19 – Capstraw	9 – Tied	4 – Capstraw	John J. Lee Amphitheater (240); New Haven, CT
November 14, 2025*; 1:30 p.m., ESPN+		at St. John's	L 60–88	0–3	12 – Tied	8 – Capstraw	7 – Capstraw	Carnesecca Arena (518); Queens, NY
November 18, 2025; 5:00 p.m., ESPN+		Quinnipiac	L 46–69	0–4	16 – Moore	7 – Chapman	2 – Tied	John J. Lee Amphitheater (354); New Haven, CT
November 21, 2025*; 7:00 p.m., ESPN+		at Providence	L 64–75	0–5	16 – Tied	8 – Chapman	3 – Tied	Alumni Hall (652); Providence, RI
November 23, 2025*; 1:00 p.m., ESPN+		Loyola (MD)	L 48–73	0–6	11 – Moore	6 – Kastl	5 – Vydrova	John J. Lee Amphitheater (267); New Haven, CT
November 26, 2025*; 11:00 a.m., ESPN+		at American	W 63–54	1–6	22 – Moore	11 – Chapman	6 – Vydrova	Bender Arena (304); Washington, D.C.
November 30, 2025*; 1:00 p.m., B1G+		at Penn State	L 64–82	1–7	19 – Vydrova	6 – Gibson	8 – Kastl	Rec Hall (1,461); State College, PA
December 3, 2025*; 4:30 p.m., ESPN+		Bryant	W 61–48	2–7	22 – Moore	9 – Kastl	6 – Capstraw	John J. Lee Amphitheater (231); New Haven, CT
December 6, 2025*; 2:00 p.m., ESPN+		at Rider	W 53–52	3–7	16 – Chapman	8 – Kastl	4 – Tied	Alumni Gymnasium (482); Lawrenceville, NJ
December 8, 2025*; 5:30 p.m., ESPN+		at New Haven	W 63–49	4–7	23 – Moore	10 – Chapman	5 – Tied	Jeffery P. Hazell Center (411); West Haven, CT
December 18, 2025*; 11:30 a.m., FloSports		at Monmouth	L 46–50 ^{OT}	4–8	10 – Moore	14 – Meng	2 – Tied	OceanFirst Bank Center (1,061); West Long Branch, NJ
December 20, 2025*; 12:00 p.m., ESPN+		at High Point	L 83–85 ^{2OT}	4–9	33 – Moore	15 – Meng	7 – Capstraw	Qubein Center (954); High Point, NC
Ivy League regular season
January 5, 2026; 2:00 p.m., ESPN+		Brown	L 72−88	4−10 (0−1)	25 – Moore	6 – Tied	9 – Capstraw	John J. Lee Amphitheater (425); New Haven, CT
January 10, 2026; 2:00 p.m., ESPN+		No. 24 Princeton	L 50–76	4–11 (0–2)	14 – Vydrova	10 – Meng	3 – Chapman	John J. Lee Amphitheater (557); New Haven, CT
January 17, 2026; 2:00 p.m., ESPN+		at Columbia	L 58–85	4–12 (0–3)	18 – Capstraw	8 – Chapman	4 – Tied	Levien Gymnasium (1,176); New York, NY
January 19, 2026; 2:00 p.m., ESPN+		at Cornell	W 58−43	5−12 (1–3)	18 – Moore	9 – Capstraw	8 – Capstraw	Newman Arena (284); Ithaca, NY
January 24, 2026; 2:00 p.m., ESPN+		Penn	L 37–64	5−13 (1–4)	12 – Moore	10 – Meng	3 – Tied	John J. Lee Amphitheater (529); New Haven, CT
January 30, 2026; 7:00 p.m., ESPN+		at Harvard	L 44–72	5−14 (1–5)	17 – Vydrova	11 – Capstraw	3 – Capstraw	Lavietes Pavilion (982); Cambridge, MA
January 31, 2026; 5:00 p.m., ESPN+		at Dartmouth	L 59–77	5−15 (1–6)	17 – Moore	9 – Chapman	3 – Chapman	Leede Arena (1,001); Hanover, NH
February 7, 2026; 2:00 p.m., ESPN+		at Brown	L 52–66	5−16 (1–7)	15 – Moore	12 – Meng	4 – Moore	Pizzitola Sports Center (256); Providence, RI
February 13, 2026; 6:00 p.m., ESPN+		Harvard	L 62–70	5−17 (1–8)	32 – Moore	8 – Meng	4 – Chapman	John J. Lee Amphitheater (571); New Haven, CT
February 14, 2026; 5:00 p.m., ESPN+		Dartmouth	W 82–54	6−17 (2–8)	26 – Moore	14 – Meng	6 – Capstraw	John J. Lee Amphitheater (509); New Haven, CT
February 21, 2026; 2:00 p.m., ESPN+		at Penn	L 52–68	6–18 (2–9)	19 – Moore	12 – Capstraw	6 – Capstraw	The Palestra (733); Philadelphia, PA
February 27, 2026; 6:00 p.m., ESPN+		Columbia	L 47–68	6–19 (2–10)	15 – Moore	9 – Capstraw	3 – Capstraw	John J. Lee Amphitheater (447); New Haven, CT
February 28, 2026; 5:00 p.m., ESPN+		Cornell	W 57–45	7–19 (3–10)	15 – Capstraw	11 – Meng	4 – Vydrova	John J. Lee Amphitheater (465); New Haven, CT
March 7, 2026; 2:00 p.m., ESPN+		at No. 23 Princeton	L 55–78	7–20 (3–11)	19 – Moore	5 – Tied	4 – Capstraw	Jadwin Gymnasium (1,438); Princeton, NJ
*Non-conference game. ^{#}Rankings from AP Poll. (#) Tournament seedings in parentheses. All times are in Eastern Time.

== See also ==
- 2025–26 Yale Bulldogs men's basketball team
