= 2025–26 Brown Bears women's basketball team =

American college basketball season

2025–26 Brown Bears women's basketball
- Conference: Ivy League
- Record: 16–11 (8–6 Ivy)
- Head coach: Monique LeBlanc (6th season)
- Assistant coaches: Tyler Patch; Jason Pellum; Devon Quattrocchi; James Logan Hatch
- Home arena: Pizzitola Sports Center

2025–26 Ivy League women's basketball standings
	Conf.				Overall
Team	W		L	PCT	W		L	PCT
No. 23 Princeton †	12	–	2	.857	26	–	3	.897
Columbia	11	–	3	.786	21	–	8	.724
Harvard	10	–	4	.714	19	–	11	.633
Brown	8	–	6	.571	16	–	11	.593
Penn	7	–	7	.500	17	–	10	.630
Cornell	4	–	10	.286	9	–	18	.333
Yale	3	–	11	.214	7	–	20	.259
Dartmouth	1	–	13	.071	10	–	17	.370
† 2026 Ivy League tournament winner As of March 19, 2026; Rankings from AP Poll

The 2025–26 Brown Bears women's basketball team currently represents Brown University during the 2025–26 NCAA Division I women's basketball season. The Bears, led by sixth-year head coach Monique LeBlanc, play their home games at the Pizzitola Sports Center in Providence, Rhode Island as members of the Ivy League.

== Previous season ==
The Bears finished the 2024–25 season 12–15 overall and 6–8 in Ivy League play, tying for fourth place with Penn. They ultimately failed to qualify for the Ivy League tournament due to the Quakers' better overall record at 15–13.

== Offseason ==
=== Departures ===
Brown Departures
Name	Num	Pos.	Height	Year	Hometown	Reason for Departure
Isabella Mauricio	4	G	5'4"	Senior	Pleasanton, CA	Graduated
Gianna Aiello	25	C	6'4"	Senior	Matawan, NJ	Graduated

=== Incoming transfers ===
Name	Num	Pos.	Height	Year	Hometown	Previous School
Charlotte Climenhage	1	G	6'0"	Junior	Folsom, CA	Nevada
Monét Witherspoon	7	G	5'8"	Sophomore	St. Louis, MO	Tufts (DIII)

=== Recruiting ===
There was no recruiting class for the class of 2025.

== Roster ==
2025–26 Brown Bears women's basketball team
Players
Coaches

Pos.	#	Name	Height	Year	Previous school	Hometown
G	1	Charlotte Climenhage	6 ft 1 in (1.85 m)	Jr	Folsom High School; Nevada	Folsom, CA
G	2	Gia Powell	5 ft 8 in (1.73 m)	So	Meadowdale High School	Edmonds, WA
G	3	Lindsay Harzich	5 ft 11 in (1.8 m)	Fr	Benet Academy	Hinsdale, IL
G/F	4	Isabella Wesley	5 ft 10 in (1.78 m)	Fr	The Dalton School	New York, NY
G	5	Olivia Young	5 ft 11 in (1.8 m)	Jr	Cardinal Gibbons High School	Durham, NC
G	7	Monét Witherspoon	5 ft 8 in (1.73 m)	So	John Burroughs School; Tufts	St. Louis, MO
G	8	Sela Klein	5 ft 11 in (1.8 m)	So	New Trier Township High School	Wilmette, IL
F	9	Morgan Ross	6 ft 0 in (1.83 m)	Fr	Head-Royce School	Oakland, CA
F	11	Alyssa Moreland	5 ft 11 in (1.8 m)	Sr	Tilton School	Beverly, MA
G	12	Charlotte Adams-Lopez	5 ft 7 in (1.7 m)	Fr	Bishop Feehan High School	North Attleboro, MA
G	14	Mady Calhoun	5 ft 10 in (1.78 m)	Sr	Barrington High School	Barrington, RI
F	15	Beth Nelson	6 ft 0 in (1.83 m)	Sr	Oakland High School	Murfreesboro, TN
G	21	Grace Arnolie	5 ft 8 in (1.73 m)	Sr	James Madison High School	Vienna, VA
G	22	Mackenzie Leahy	5 ft 8 in (1.73 m)	Sr	Jacobs High School	West Dundee, IL
F	23	Ada Anamekwe	6 ft 0 in (1.83 m)	Sr	Plano East High School	Parker, TX
F	33	Aima Ofunrein	6 ft 1 in (1.85 m)	So	Stony Point High School	Round Rock, TX

Head coach

- Monique LeBlanc (Bucknell & Northern Arizona)

Assistant coach(es)

- Tyler Patch (Rhode Island College)
- Jason Pellum (Connecticut)
- Devon Quattrocchi (Smith)
- James Logan Hatch (Stanford & Columbia) (1)

Strength and conditioning coach(es)

- Adrianna Johnson (Springfield & PennWest California)

Athletic trainer(s)

- Heather Hanjack (Merrimack & Boston College)

Legend

- (C) Team captain
- (S) Suspended
- (I) Ineligible
- (W) Walk-on
- (1) is the Director of Operations
- Injured
- Current redshirt

Roster
Last update: November 7, 2025

== Schedule and results ==
Date time, TV	Rank^{#}	Opponent^{#}	Result	Record	High points	High rebounds	High assists	Site (attendance) city, state
Non-conference regular season
November 7, 2025*; 7:30 p.m., ESPN+		at Belmont	L 61–83	0–1	22 – Moreland	11 – Moreland	6 – Leahy	Curb Event Center (1,020); Nashville, TN
November 12, 2025*; 6:00 p.m., ESPN+		at Holy Cross	L 64–65	0–2	14 – Tied	11 – Moreland	5 – Moreland	Hart Center Arena (684); Worcester, MA
November 16, 2025*; 3:00 p.m., ESPN+		at UMBC	W 56–54	1–2	14 – Adams-Lopez	14 – Moreland	2 – Tied	Chesapeake Employers Insurance Arena (775); Catonsville, MD
November 19, 2025*; 7:00 p.m., ESPN+		Boston University	W 57–54	2–2	14 – Arnolie	7 – Moreland	5 – Arnolie	Pizzitola Sports Center (234); Providence, RI
November 23, 2025*; 12:00 p.m., ESPN+		Maine	W 70–39	3–2	22 – Arnolie	7 – Moreland	7 – Adams-Lopez	Pizzitola Sports Center (217); Providence, RI
November 25, 2025*; 7:00 p.m., ESPN+		New Hampshire	W 68–60	4–2	17 – Moreland	10 – Moreland	5 – Tied	Pizzitola Sports Center (309); Providence, RI
November 28, 2025*; 2:00 p.m., ESPN+		at Bucknell	W 61–50	5–2	16 – Moreland	16 – Moreland	7 – Arnolie	Sojka Pavilion (205); Lewisburg, PA
November 30, 2025*; 2:00 p.m., ESPN+		at Lehigh	L 54–58	5–3	12 – Arnolie	7 – Ofunrein	7 – Adams-Lopez	Stabler Arena (485); Bethlehem, PA
December 3, 2025*; 6:00 p.m., ESPN+		at Stonehill	W 74–46	6–3	27 – Arnolie	8 – Wesley	2 – Tied	Merkert Gymnasium (177); Easton, MA
December 6, 2025*; 1:00 p.m., ESPN+		at George Washington	L 48–53	6–4	21 – Arnolie	14 – Moreland	6 – Moreland	Charles E. Smith Center (734); Washington, D.C.
December 9, 2025*; 7:00 p.m., ESPN+		at Merrimack	W 70–60	7–4	15 – Nelson	16 – Moreland	7 – Arnolie	Lawler Arena (428); North Andover, MA
December 21, 2025*; 12:00 p.m., ESPN+		Monmouth	Canceled due to 2025 Brown University shooting					Pizzitola Sports Center; Providence, RI
December 29, 2025*; 12:00 p.m., ESPN+		Wheaton (MA)	W 76–24	8–4	13 – Arnolie	10 – Wesley	4 – Klein	Pizzitola Sports Center (197); Providence, RI
Ivy League regular season
January 5, 2026; 2:00 p.m., ESPN+		at Yale	W 88−72	9−4 (1−0)	23 – Moreland	13 – Moreland	7 – Arnolie	John J. Lee Amphitheater (425); New Haven, CT
January 10, 2026; 2:00 p.m., ESPN+		Penn	W 77–65 ^{2OT}	10–4 (2–0)	24 – Arnolie	9 – Tied	5 – Nelson	Pizzitola Sports Center (294); Providence, RI
January 17, 2026; 1:00 p.m., ESPN+		at Cornell	W 64–48	11–4 (3–0)	24 – Arnolie	10 – Moreland	5 – Arnolie	Newman Arena (327); Ithaca, NY
January 19, 2026; 2:00 p.m., ESPN+		at Columbia	L 52–68	11–5 (3–1)	21 – Arnolie	10 – Moreland	2 – Wesley	Levien Gymnasium (1,605); New York, NY
January 24, 2026; 2:00 p.m., ESPN+		No. 20 Princeton	L 49–58	11–6 (3–2)	14 – Arnolie	10 – Moreland	5 – Moreland	Pizzitola Sports Center (328); Providence, RI
January 30, 2026; 6:00 p.m., ESPN+		at Dartmouth	W 55–41	12–6 (4–2)	14 – Tied	9 – Tied	4 – Arnolie	Leede Arena (833); Hanover, NH
January 31, 2026; 7:00 p.m., ESPN+		at Harvard	L 58–61	12–7 (4–3)	16 – Arnolie	9 – Moreland	6 – Moreland	Lavietes Pavilion (861); Cambridge, MA
February 7, 2026; 2:00 p.m., ESPN+		Yale	W 66–52	13–7 (5–3)	22 – Arnolie	10 – Moreland	3 – Arnolie	Pizzitola Sports Center (256); Providence, RI
February 13, 2026; 7:00 p.m., ESPN+		Dartmouth	W 58–51	14–7 (6–3)	19 – Arnolie	19 – Moreland	4 – Adams-Lopez	Pizzitola Sports Center (182); Providence, RI
February 14, 2026; 5:00 p.m., ESPN+		Harvard	W 68–62	15–7 (7–3)	21 – Arnolie	9 – Tied	4 – Arnolie	Pizzitola Sports Center (242); Providence, RI
February 21, 2026; 5:30 p.m., ESPN+		at Princeton	L 37–69	15–8 (7–4)	14 – Arnolie	6 – Moreland	2 – Tied	Jadwin Gymnasium (1,661); Princeton, NJ
February 27, 2026; 7:00 p.m., ESPN+		Cornell	W 62-47	16-8 (8-4)	23 – Arnolie	9 – Tied	3 – Tied	Pizzitola Sports Center (439); Providence, RI
February 28, 2026; 5:00 p.m., ESPN+		Columbia	L 56-59	16-9 (8-5)	20 – Arnolie	9 – Moreland	3 – Arnolie	Pizzitola Sports Center (354); Providence, RI
March 7, 2026; 2:00 p.m., ESPN+		at Penn	L 56-69	16-10 (8-6)	12 – Moreland	12 – Moreland	2 – Tied	The Palestra (715); Philadelphia, PA
Ivy League tournament
March 13, 2026; 4:30 pm, ESPN+	(4)	vs. (1) No. 23 Princeton; Semifinal						Newman Arena (nbsp); Ithaca, NY
*Non-conference game. ^{#}Rankings from AP Poll. (#) Tournament seedings in parentheses. All times are in Eastern Time.

== See also ==
- 2025–26 Brown Bears men's basketball team
