= 2025–26 Penn Quakers women's basketball team =

American college basketball season

2025–26 Penn Quakers women's basketball

FDU Christmas Classic champions
- Conference: Ivy League
- Record: 17-10 (7-7 Ivy)
- Head coach: Mike McLaughlin (17th season)
- Associate head coach: Ashley Robinson
- Assistant coach: Ryan Weiss
- Home arena: The Palestra

2025–26 Ivy League women's basketball standings
| | Conf. | | | | Overall |
| Team | W | | L | PCT | W | | L | PCT |
|---|---|---|---|---|---|---|---|---|
| Princeton † | 12 | – | 2 | .857 | 26 | – | 4 | .867 |
| Columbia | 11 | – | 3 | .786 | 25 | – | 8 | .758 |
| Harvard | 10 | – | 4 | .714 | 20 | – | 12 | .625 |
| Brown | 8 | – | 6 | .571 | 16 | – | 11 | .593 |
| Penn | 7 | – | 7 | .500 | 17 | – | 10 | .630 |
| Cornell | 4 | – | 10 | .286 | 9 | – | 18 | .333 |
| Yale | 3 | – | 11 | .214 | 7 | – | 20 | .259 |
| Dartmouth | 1 | – | 13 | .071 | 10 | – | 17 | .370 |
† 2026 Ivy League tournament winner

The 2025–26 Penn Quakers women's basketball team currently represents the University of Pennsylvania during the 2025–26 NCAA Division I women's basketball season. The Quakers, led by 16th-year head coach Mike McLaughlin, play their home games at The Palestra in Philadelphia, Pennsylvania as members of the Ivy League.

== Previous season ==
The Quakers finished the 2024–25 season 15–13 and 6–8 in Ivy League play, finishing in a tie for 4th place with Brown. They clinched the No. 4 seed in the Ivy League tournament over Brown due to having the better overall record, losing to No. 1 seed Columbia in the semi-final game 54–60.

== Offseason ==
=== Departures ===
Penn Departures
| Name | Num | Pos. | Height | Year | Hometown | Reason for Departure |
|---|---|---|---|---|---|---|
| Stina Almqvist | 5 | G | 6'1" | Senior | Kinna, Sweden | Graduated |
| Lizzy Groetsch | 32 | G | 5'10" | Senior | Sewickley, PA | Graduated |

=== Transfers ===
There were no transfers for the 2025–26 season.

=== Recruiting ===
There was no recruiting class for the class of 2025.

== Roster ==
2025–26 Penn Quakers women's basketball team
Players
Coaches

| Pos. | # | Name | Height | Year | Previous school | Hometown |
|---|---|---|---|---|---|---|
| G | 0 | Ashna Tambe | 5 ft 7 in (1.7 m) | So | Hockaday School | Plano, TX |
| G | 2 | Brooke Suttle | 6 ft 0 in (1.83 m) | So | Campbell High School | Atlanta, GA |
| G | 3 | Ruke Ogbevire | 5 ft 7 in (1.7 m) | Fr | Fulshear High School | Houston, TX |
| G | 4 | Saniah Caldwell | 5 ft 9 in (1.75 m) | Sr | Saddle River Day School | Franklin Lakes, NJ |
| F | 5 | Ari Paraskevopoulou | 6 ft 0 in (1.83 m) | Fr | 16th General HS of Athens | Athens, Greece |
| G | 8 | Sarah Miller | 5 ft 10 in (1.78 m) | So | Xavier College Prep | Phoenix, AZ |
| C | 10 | Tina Njike | 6 ft 2 in (1.88 m) | Jr | Skyline High School | Salt Lake City, UT |
| G | 11 | Simone Sawyer | 5 ft 11 in (1.8 m) | Sr | Stevenson High School | Lincolnshire, IL |
| G | 14 | Reagan Jamison | 6 ft 0 in (1.83 m) | So | Camas High School | Vancouver, WA |
| G | 15 | Georgia Heine | 6 ft 0 in (1.83 m) | Sr | Manasquan High School | Spring Lake Heights, NJ |
| G | 20 | Abby Sharpe | 6 ft 0 in (1.83 m) | Jr | Plymouth-Whitemarsh High School | Lafayette Hill, PA |
| C | 21 | Kate Lipatova | 6 ft 3 in (1.91 m) | Fr | Putnam Science Academy | Moscow, Russia |
| G | 22 | Mataya Gayle | 5 ft 7 in (1.7 m) | Jr | River Ridge High School | Woodstock, GA |
| G | 23 | Ese Ogbevire | 5 ft 7 in (1.7 m) | Jr | Fulshear High School | Houston, TX |
| F | 25 | Katie Collins | 6 ft 1 in (1.85 m) | So | Manasquan High School | Manasquan, NJ |
| G | 32 | Sarah Gordon | 5 ft 11 in (1.8 m) | Fr | Vestavia Hills High School | Vestavia Hills, AL |
| F | 33 | Gabriella Kelley | 6 ft 1 in (1.85 m) | So | San Francisco University High School | San Francisco, CA |

Head coach

- Mike McLaughlin (Holy Family)

Assistant coach(es)

- Ashley Robinson (Saint Joseph's)
- Ryan Weise (Long Island)

Legend

- (C) Team captain
- (S) Suspended
- (I) Ineligible
- (W) Walk-on
- Injured
- Current redshirt

Roster
Last update: October 23, 2025

== Schedule and results ==
| Date time, TV | Rank^{#} | Opponent^{#} | Result | Record | High points | High rebounds | High assists | Site (attendance) city, state |
Non-conference regular season
| November 7, 2025*; 4:00 p.m., ESPN+ | | King's (PA) | W 105–31 | 1–0 | 18 – Collins | 6 – Njike | 4 – Tied | The Palestra (421); Philadelphia, PA |
| November 10, 2025*; 6:00 p.m., ESPN+ | | at Delaware State | W 63–41 | 2–0 | 15 – Njike | 12 – Tied | 3 – Tied | Memorial Hall (175); Dover, DE |
| November 12, 2025*; 6:00 p.m., ESPN+ | | at Drexel | L 55–72 | 2–1 | 13 – Gayle | 12 – Collins | 7 – Gayle | Daskalakis Athletic Center (808); Philadelphia, PA |
| November 15, 2025*; 1:00 p.m., ESPN+ | | at Hofstra | W 67–55 | 3–1 | 21 – Sawyer | 9 – Sawyer | 5 – Caldwell | Mack Sports Complex (462); Hempstead, NY |
| November 18, 2025*; 6:00 p.m., ESPN+ | | Norfolk State | W 55–50 | 4–1 | 12 – Njike | 8 – Sawyer | 3 – Tied | The Palestra (206); Philadelphia, PA |
| November 24, 2025*; 6:00 p.m., ESPN+ | | Saint Joseph's | L 53–74 | 4–2 | 14 – Sawyer | 7 – Sawyer | 4 – Tied | The Palestra (491); Philadelphia, PA |
| November 28, 2025*; 2:00 p.m., ESPN+ | | at St. Thomas (TX) | W 78–44 | 5–2 | 18 – Collins | 8 – Collins | 6 – Gayle | Jeraback Athletic and Activity Center (100); Houston, TX |
| November 30, 2025*; 2:00 p.m., ESPN+ | | at No. 4 Texas | L 63–81 | 5–3 | 24 – Gayle | 9 – Collins | 8 – Tied | Moody Center (8,642); Austin, TX |
| December 4, 2025*; 6:00 p.m., ESPN+ | | Maine | W 58–35 | 6–3 | 21 – Sawyer | 13 – Collins | 4 – Gayle | The Palestra (204); Philadelphia, PA |
| December 7, 2025*; 12:00 p.m., ESPN+ | | vs. La Salle; Toyota Women's Big 5 Classic | W 65–52 | 7–3 | 20 – Collins | 13 – Njike | 6 – Caldwell | Finneran Pavilion (–); Villanova, PA |
| December 19, 2025*; 11:00 a.m., ESPN+ | | Washington State | W 67–62 | 8–3 | 15 – Tied | 9 – Njike | 6 – Gayle | The Palestra (768); Philadelphia, PA |
| December 29, 2025*; 4:00 p.m., ESPN+ | | vs. Maryland Eastern Shore; FDU Christmas Classic semifinals | W 78–57 | 9–3 | 18 – Collins | 11 – Collins | 5 – Gayle | Bogota Savings Bank Center (139); Hackensack, NJ |
| December 30, 2025*; 1:00 p.m., ESPN+ | | vs. Binghamton; FDU Christmas Classic championship | W 59–54 | 10–3 | 21 – Collins | 8 – Njike | 5 – Gayle | Bogota Savings Bank Center (109); Hackensack, NJ |
Ivy League regular season
| January 3, 2026; 2:00 p.m., ESPN+ | | No. 25 Princeton | L 68–74 | 10–4 (0–1) | 17 – Gayle | 7 – Gayle | 6 – Gayle | The Palestra (992); Philadelphia, PA |
| January 10, 2026; 2:00 p.m., ESPN+ | | at Brown | L 65–77 ^{2OT} | 10–5 (0–2) | 18 – Gayle | 11 – Collins | 4 – Gayle | Pizzitola Sports Center (294); Providence, RI |
| January 17, 2026; 2:00 p.m., ESPN+ | | Harvard | L 42–53 | 10−6 (0−3) | 16 – Gayle | 9 – Collins | 3 – Collins | The Palestra (446); Philadelphia, PA |
| January 19, 2026; 2:00 p.m., ESPN+ | | Dartmouth | W 67−59 | 11−6 (1−3) | 16 – Njike | 13 – Njike | 4 – Gayle | The Palestra (550); Philadelphia, PA |
| January 24, 2026; 2:00 p.m., ESPN+ | | at Yale | W 64–37 | 12–6 (2–3) | 18 – Sawyer | 9 – Collins | 6 – Gayle | John J. Lee Amphitheater (529); New Haven, CT |
| January 30, 2026; 6:00 p.m., ESPN+ | | Cornell | L 58–62 | 12–7 (2–4) | 20 – Gayle | 12 – Collins | 6 – Caldwell | The Palestra (116); Philadelphia, PA |
| January 31, 2026; 5:00 p.m., ESPN+ | | Columbia | W 64–55 | 13–7 (3–4) | 16 – Gayle | 10 – Njike | 7 – Gayle | The Palestra (762); Philadelphia, PA |
| February 6, 2026; 7:00 p.m., ESPN+ | | at No. 23 Princeton | L 50–69 | 13–8 (3–5) | 16 – Tied | 10 – Njike | 4 – Caldwell | Jadwin Gymnasium (917); Princeton, NJ |
| February 13, 2026; 6:00 p.m., ESPN+ | | at Cornell | W 72–66 | 14–8 (4–5) | 23 – Gayle | 9 – Sawyer | 7 – Caldwell | Newman Arena (186); Ithaca, NY |
| February 14, 2026; 5:00 p.m., ESPN+ | | at Columbia | L 56–69 | 14–9 (4–6) | 22 – Collins | 8 – Sawyer | 8 – Gayle | Levien Gymnasium (1,612); New York, NY |
| February 21, 2026; 2:00 p.m., ESPN+ | | Yale | W 68–52 | 15–9 (5–6) | 22 – Gayle | 8 – Sawyer | 4 – Gayle | The Palestra (733); Philadelphia, PA |
| February 27, 2026; 7:00 p.m., ESPN+ | | at Harvard | L 46-60 | 15-10 (5-7) | 16 – Njike | 7 – Tied | 5 – Gayle | Lavietes Pavilion (635); Cambridge, MA |
| February 28, 2026; 5:00 p.m., ESPN+ | | at Dartmouth | W 89-66 | 16-10 (6-7) | 23 – Sawyer | 8 – Njike | 8 – Gayle | Leede Arena (763); Hanover, NH |
| March 7, 2026; 2:00 p.m., ESPN+ | | Brown | W 69-56 | 17-10 (7-7) | 17 – Tied | 8 – Suttle | 4 – Gayle | The Palestra (715); Philadelphia, PA |
*Non-conference game. ^{#}Rankings from AP poll. (#) Tournament seedings in parentheses. All times are in Eastern.
