= 2025–26 Cornell Big Red women's basketball team =

American college basketball season

2025–26 Cornell Big Red women's basketball
- Conference: Ivy League
- Record: 9–18 (4–10 Ivy)
- Head coach: Emily Garner (2nd season)
- Assistant coaches: Courtnay Pilypaitis; LaSashia Connelly; Colleen Corcoran
- Home arena: Newman Arena

2025–26 Ivy League women's basketball standings
	Conf.				Overall
Team	W		L	PCT	W		L	PCT
No. 23 Princeton †	12	–	2	.857	26	–	4	.867
Columbia	11	–	3	.786	22	–	8	.733
Harvard	10	–	4	.714	20	–	11	.645
Brown	8	–	6	.571	16	–	11	.593
Penn	7	–	7	.500	17	–	10	.630
Cornell	4	–	10	.286	9	–	18	.333
Yale	3	–	11	.214	7	–	20	.259
Dartmouth	1	–	13	.071	10	–	17	.370
† 2026 Ivy League tournament winner As of March 22, 2026; Rankings from AP Poll

The 2025–26 Cornell Big Red women's basketball team currently represents Cornell University during the 2025–26 NCAA Division I women's basketball season. The Big Red, led by second-year head coach Emily Garner, play their home games at Newman Arena in Ithaca, New York, as members of the Ivy League.

== Previous season ==
Under first-year head coach Emily Garner, who replaced long-time head coach Dayna Smith after 21 seasons, the Big Red finished the 2024–25 season 7–20 and 3–11 in Ivy League play, to finish in a tie for 6th place with Yale. They failed to qualify for the Ivy League tournament.

== Offseason ==
=== Departures ===
Cornell Departures
Name	Num	Pos.	Height	Year	Hometown	Reason for Departure
Sarah Hathorn	4	G	5'4"	Junior	College Station, TX	TBD
Jada Davis	10	F	6'2"	Senior	San Diego, CA	Graduated
Arianna Linoxilakis	11	F	6'1"	Senior	Weston, MA	Graduated
Maya Watts	15	C	6'1"	Sophomore	Hopewell Junction, NY	TBD
Lexi Green	20	G/F	5'9"	Senior	Pittsford, NY	Graduated
Kameryn Perry	23	G	5'10"	Sophomore	Middletown, CT	TBD
Summer Parker-Hall	24	F	6'0"	Senior	Chicago, IL	Graduated

=== Transfers ===
There were no transfers for the 2025–26 season.

=== Recruiting class ===
There was no recruiting class for the class of 2025.

== Roster ==
2025–26 Cornell Big Red women's basketball team
Players
Coaches

Pos.	#	Name	Height	Year	Previous school	Hometown
G	0	Azareya Kilgoe	5 ft 4 in (1.63 m)	Jr	Sanford School	Seaford, DE
G/F	1	Alana Andrews	6 ft 2 in (1.88 m)	So	Grace Church School	New York, NY
G/F	3	Vivienne Knee	5 ft 9 in (1.75 m)	Sr	Lycée Français de New York	New York, NY
G	4	Trinity Jones	5 ft 7 in (1.7 m)	Fr	Desert Vista High School	Phoenix, AZ
G/F	5	Rachel Kaus	6 ft 0 in (1.83 m)	Jr	Lake Forest High School	Lake Bluff, IL
F	10	Audrey Childers	6 ft 3 in (1.91 m)	Fr	Los Gatos High School	Los Gatos, CA
F	11	Grace Renners	6 ft 1 in (1.85 m)	Fr	Seattle Prep	Bellevue, WA
G	12	Audrey Chen	5 ft 7 in (1.7 m)	So	La Salle College Prep	South Pasadena, CA
G	20	Willa Chinn	5 ft 10 in (1.78 m)	Fr	Lakeside School	Seattle, WA
G	21	Kelsey Langston	5 ft 7 in (1.7 m)	So	Loyola Academy	Wilmette, IL
G	22	Clarke Jackson	5 ft 9 in (1.75 m)	Jr	Gahanna-Lincoln High School	Columbus, OH
G/F	25	Ally Pape	5 ft 11 in (1.8 m)	Fr	Maine South High School	Park Ridge, IL
F	32	Emily Pape	6 ft 1 in (1.85 m)	Sr	Maine South High School	Park Ridge, IL
G	33	Paige Engels	5 ft 8 in (1.73 m)	So	Loyola Academy	Golf, IL

Head coach

- Emily Garner (Lafayette)

Assistant coach(es)

- Courtnay Pilypaitis (Vermont)
- LaSashia Connelly (Salem College)
- Colleen Corcoran (Le Moyne)

Legend

- (C) Team captain
- (S) Suspended
- (I) Ineligible
- (W) Walk-on
- Injured
- Current redshirt

Roster
Last update: November 7, 2025

== Schedule and results ==
Date time, TV	Rank^{#}	Opponent^{#}	Result	Record	High points	High rebounds	High assists	Site (attendance) city, state
Regular season
November 7, 2025*; 6:00 p.m., ESPN+		at Bryant	L 38–64	0–1	9 – E. Pape	7 – E. Pape	3 – Tied	Chace Athletic Center (150); Smithfield, RI
November 11, 2025*; 6:00 p.m., ESPN+		at Pittsburgh	L 54–56	0–2	15 – Jackson	9 – E. Pape	5 – Langston	Petersen Events Center (627); Pittsburgh, PA
November 14, 2025*; 6:00 p.m., NEC Front Row		at Mercyhurst	W 53–49	1–2	18 – Kaus	13 – Kaus	7 – Engels	Mercyhurst Athletic Center (227); Erie, PA
November 16, 2025*; 12:00 p.m., ESPN+		at Canisius	W 62–50	2-2	18 – Kaus	8 – E. Pape	3 – Tied	Koessler Athletic Center (107); Buffalo, NY
November 18, 2025*; 6:00 p.m., ESPN+		Colgate	L 54–60	2–3	18 – Tied	9 – E. Pape	3 – Tied	Newman Arena (382); Ithaca, NY
November 22, 2025*; 4:00 p.m., NEC Front Row		at Le Moyne	W 52–51 ^{OT}	3–3	14 – Tied	5 – Tied	5 – Engels	Ted Grant Court (414); Syracuse, NY
November 26, 2025*; 2:30 p.m., ESPN+		Siena	W 49–47	4–3	13 – Engels	7 – Tied	4 – Tied	Newman Arena (314); Ithaca, NY
November 30, 2025*; 2:00 p.m., NEC Front Row		at Wagner	L 54–67	4–4	14 – Jackson	10 – Jackson	4 – Engels	Spiro Sports Center (300); Staten Island, NY
December 3, 2025*; 6:00 p.m., ESPN+		at Lehigh	L 52–66	4–5	18 – E. Pape	6 – E. Pape	5 – Langston	Stabler Arena (444); Bethlehem, PA
December 6, 2025*; 1:00 p.m., ESPN+		Quinnipiac	L 47–68	4–6	14 – Kaus	6 – Tied	4 – Langston	Newman Arena (–); Ithaca, NY
December 9, 2025*; 7:00 p.m., ESPN+		Army	L 52–76	4–7	18 – Kaus	5 – Kaus	3 – Langston	Newman Arena (123); Ithaca, NY
December 28, 2025*; 4:00 p.m., ACCNX		at Stanford	L 50–82	4–8	24 – E. Pape	4 – Tied	4 – Tied	Maples Pavilion (3,397); Stanford, CA
January 3, 2026; 2:00 p.m., ESPN+		at Columbia	W 67–60	5–8 (1–0)	19 – E. Pape	7 – Jackson	7 – Jackson	Levien Gymnasium (1,026); New York, NY
January 10, 2026; 1:00 p.m., ESPN+		at Dartmouth	W 61–52	6–8 (2–0)	14 – E. Pape	10 – Jackson	7 – Jackson	Leede Arena (831); Hanover, NH
January 13, 2026*; 1:00 p.m., ESPN+		SUNY Delhi	W 106–27	7–8	24 – A. Pape	14 – Andrews	8 – Knee	Newman Arena (111); Ithaca, NY
January 17, 2026; 1:00 p.m., ESPN+		Brown	L 48–64	7–9 (2–1)	13 – Kaus	6 – E. Pape	2 – Tied	Newman Arena (327); Ithaca, NY
January 19, 2026; 2:00 p.m., ESPN+		Yale	L 43−58	7−10 (2–2)	21 – Jackson	10 – Jackson	4 – Langston	Newman Arena (284); Ithaca, NY
January 24, 2026; 1:00 p.m., ESPN+		Harvard	L 79–86	7–11 (2–3)	19 – Hinton	6 – Tied	6 – Eisendrath	Newman Arena (1,636); Ithaca, NY
January 30, 2026; 6:00 p.m., ESPN+		at Penn	W 62–58	8–11 (3–3)	20 – Pape	9 – Jackson	5 – Langston	The Palestra (116); Philadelphia, PA
January 31, 2026; 5:00 p.m., ESPN+		at No. 19 Princeton	L 61–72	8–12 (3–4)	20 – Kaus	8 – Jackson	8 – Langston	Jadwin Gymnasium (1,734); Princeton, NJ
February 7, 2026; 1:00 p.m., ESPN+		Columbia	L 55–80	8–13 (3–5)	13 – Langston	4 – Kaus	4 – Pape	Newman Arena (247); Ithaca, NY
February 13, 2026; 6:00 p.m., ESPN+		Penn	L 66–72 ^{OT}	8–14 (3–6)	25 – Kaus	9 – Kaus	8 – Langston	Newman Arena (186); Ithaca, NY
February 14, 2026; 5:00 p.m., ESPN+		No. 24 Princeton	L 38–59	8–15 (3–7)	8 – Tied	6 – Pape	2 – Tied	Newman Arena (216); Ithaca, NY
February 21, 2026; 4:00 p.m., ESPN+		at Harvard						Lavietes Pavilion; Cambridge, MA
February 27, 2026; 7:00 p.m., ESPN+		at Brown						Pizzitola Sports Center; Providence, RI
February 28, 2026; 5:00 p.m., ESPN+		at Yale						John J. Lee Amphitheater; New Haven, CT
March 7, 2026; 1:00 p.m., ESPN+		Dartmouth						Newman Arena; Ithaca, NY
*Non-conference game. ^{#}Rankings from AP Poll. (#) Tournament seedings in parentheses. All times are in Eastern.
