= 2025–26 Dartmouth Big Green women's basketball team =

American college basketball season

2025–26 Dartmouth Big Green women's basketball
- Conference: Ivy League
- Record: 10–17 (1–13 Ivy)
- Head coach: Linda Cimino (3rd season)
- Associate head coach: Shelby Boyle
- Assistant coaches: Anh-Dao Tran-Lagado; Zenovia Walker
- Home arena: Leede Arena

2025–26 Ivy League women's basketball standings
	Conf.				Overall
Team	W		L	PCT	W		L	PCT
Princeton †	12	–	2	.857	26	–	4	.867
Columbia	11	–	3	.786	25	–	8	.758
Harvard	10	–	4	.714	20	–	12	.625
Brown	8	–	6	.571	16	–	11	.593
Penn	7	–	7	.500	17	–	10	.630
Cornell	4	–	10	.286	9	–	18	.333
Yale	3	–	11	.214	7	–	20	.259
Dartmouth	1	–	13	.071	10	–	17	.370
† 2026 Ivy League tournament winner

The 2025–26 Dartmouth Big Green women's basketball team represented Dartmouth College during the 2025–26 NCAA Division I women's basketball season. The Big Green, led by third-year head coach Linda Cimino, played their home games at Leede Arena in Hanover, New Hampshire as members of the Ivy League. The Big Green finished the season 10–21 overall and 1–13 in Ivy League play, finishing last in the conference for the fourth straight season. They failed to qualify for the Ivy League tournament.

== Previous season ==
The Big Green finished the 2024–25 season with an 8–19 overall record and 2–12 in Ivy League play to finish last in the conference and missing the Ivy League tournament for the third consecutive year.

== Offseason ==
=== Departures ===
Dartmouth departures
Name	Num	Pos.	Height	Year	Hometown	Reason for departure
Meena Tate	2	G	5' 11"	Sophomore	Iowa City, IA	TBD
Doreen Ariik	14	F	6' 4"	Senior	Nairobi, Kenya	Graduated
Victoria Page	15	G	5' 8"	Senior	Murfreesboro, TN	Graduated
Lucija Banovic	21	F	6' 0"	Sophomore	Zagreb, Croatia	TBD
Annika Jiwani	32	F	6' 0"	Freshman	Buena Park, CA	TBD

=== Transfers ===
There were no transfers for the season.

=== Recruiting class ===
There was no college recruiting class for the class of 2025.

== Roster ==
2025–26 Dartmouth Big Green women's basketball team
Players
Coaches

Pos.	#	Name	Height	Year	Previous school	Hometown
G	1	Nina Minicozzi	5 ft 8 in (1.73 m)	Jr	Rivers School	Belmont, MA
G	2	Emma Olausson	6 ft 0 in (1.83 m)	Fr	Hamden Hall Country Day School	Guilford, CT
G	3	Jacalyn Myrthill	5 ft 5 in (1.65 m)	Fr	Mount Paran Christian School	Atlanta, GA
F	4	Cate MacDonald	6 ft 1 in (1.85 m)	Jr	New Hampton School	Lynnfield, MA
G	5	Ellie Cerf	5 ft 6 in (1.68 m)	So	Bethlehem Central High School	Delmar, NY
F	10	Olivia Lawlor	6 ft 1 in (1.85 m)	Sr	Summit High School	Summit, NJ
G	11	Alexandra Eldredge	5 ft 11 in (1.8 m)	Jr	Worcester Academy; Southern Utah	McLean, VA
G	13	Zeynep Ozel	5 ft 8 in (1.73 m)	So	Blair Academy	Istanbul, Turkey
F	14	Yufei Zou	6 ft 4 in (1.93 m)	Fr	IMG Academy	Tianjin, China
G	15	Tahira Muhammad	5 ft 8 in (1.73 m)	So	Noble and Greenough School	Hyde Park, MA
G	20	Brooke Hollawell	5 ft 9 in (1.75 m)	Sr	Manasquan High School	Wall, NJ
F	21	Olivia Austin	6 ft 1 in (1.85 m)	So	Nazareth Academy	Western Springs, IL
G	22	Sierra Carson	5 ft 8 in (1.73 m)	Jr	Oxford Hills Comprehensive High School	Norway, ME
F	24	Debra Hill	6 ft 1 in (1.85 m)	Fr	Blair Academy; Pingry School	Bedminster, NJ
F	25	Clare Meyer	6 ft 3 in (1.91 m)	Sr	Germantown Friends School	Philadelphia, PA

Head coach

- Linda Cimino (Adelphi)

Assistant coach(es)

- Shelby Boyle (Boston College)
- Anh-Dao Tran-Lagaro (Adelphi)
- Zenoviah Walker (Transylvania)

Legend

- (C) Team captain
- (S) Suspended
- (I) Ineligible
- (W) Walk-on
- Injured
- Current redshirt

Roster
Last update: November 7, 2025

== Schedule and results ==
Date time, TV	Rank^{#}	Opponent^{#}	Result	Record	High points	High rebounds	High assists	Site (attendance) city, state
Non-conference regular season
November 7, 2025*; 6:00 p.m., ESPN+		at Boston University	W 52–50	1–0	12 – 2 tied	8 – MacDonald	3 – 2 tied	Case Gym (670); Boston, MA
November 10, 2025*; 6:30 p.m., ESPN+		at UAlbany	L 41–65	1–1	16 – Austin	6 – 2 tied	2 – Eldredge	Broadview Center (1,207); Albany, NY
November 12, 2025*; 6:30 p.m., ESPN+		Colby–Sawyer	W 98–33	2–1	17 – Austin	8 – MacDonald	10 – Ozel	Leede Arena (618); Hanover, NH
November 16, 2025*; 2:00 p.m., ESPN+		at Siena	W 65–55	3–1	14 – Minicozzi	10 – MacDonald	4 – Ozel	UHY Center (416); Loudonville, NY
December 2, 2025*; 6:00 p.m., ESPN+		Merrimack	L 57–59	3–2	13 – Minicozzi	10 – 3 tied	5 – Ozel	Leede Arena (603); Hanover, NH
December 5, 2025*; 6:00 p.m., NESN+		Central Connecticut State	W 53–44	4–2	14 – MacDonald	9 – MacDonald	4 – Meyer	Leede Arena (766); Hanover, NH
December 7, 2025*; 2:00 p.m., ESPN+		Bucknell	W 53–45	5–2	14 – Minicozzi	9 – MacDonald	8 – Ozel	Leede Arena (773); Hanover, NH
December 11, 2025*; 6:00 p.m., ESPN+		at NJIT	W 61–60	6–2	16 – MacDonald	9 – Austin	7 – Ozel	Wellness and Events Center (201); Newark, NJ
December 13, 2025*; 7:00 p.m., ESPN+		at Iona	W 65–57	7–2	14 – Ozel	8 – MacDonald	4 – 2 tied	Hynes Athletics Center (637); New Rochelle, NY
December 16, 2025*; 11:00 a.m., ESPN+		Franklin Pierce	W 68–50	8–2	16 – 2 tied	10 – Minicozzi	8 – Ozel	Leede Arena (1,528); Hanover, NH
December 20, 2025*; 1:00 p.m., ESPN+		at New Hampshire	L 38–74	8–3	14 – MacDonald	12 – Austin	3 – Ozel	Lundholm Gymnasium; Durham, NH
December 28, 2025*; 2:00 p.m., ESPN+		at Vermont	L 59–61	8–4	15 – Ozel	8 – MacDonald	2 – 2 tied	Patrick Gymnasium (1,072); Burlington, VT
December 30, 2025*; 1:00 p.m., NESN		St. Joseph's (Brooklyn)	W 99–35	9–4	16 – Ozel	6 – 2 tied	4 – 4 tied	Leede Arena (784); Hanover, NH
Ivy League regular season
January 3, 2026; 2:00 p.m., ESPN+		Harvard	L 47–72	9–5 (0–1)	17 – MacDonald	7 – MacDonald	5 – Minicozzi	Leede Arena (806); Hanover, NH
January 10, 2026; 1:00 p.m., ESPN+		Cornell	L 52–61	9–6 (0–2)	12 – MacDonald	5 – 3 tied	5 – 2 tied	Leede Arena (831); Hanover, NH
January 17, 2026; 2:00 p.m., ESPN+		at No. 22 Princeton	L 41–69	9–7 (0–3)	12 – Minicozzi	10 – Austin	3 – Ozel	Jadwin Gymnasium (1,232); Princeton, NJ
January 19, 2026; 2:00 p.m., ESPN+		at Penn	L 59−67	9−8 (0−4)	16 – Eldredge	6 – 2 tied	4 – Eldredge	The Palestra (550); Philadelphia, PA
January 24, 2026; 2:00 p.m., ESPN+		at Columbia	L 32–89	9–9 (0–5)	14 – Ozel	5 – MacDonald	4 – MacDonald	Levien Gymnasium (1,617); New York, NY
January 30, 2026; 6:00 p.m., ESPN+		Brown	L 41–55	9–10 (0–6)	8 – Hill	8 – Meyer	6 – Ozel	Leede Arena (833); Hanover, NH
January 31, 2026; 5:00 p.m., ESPN+		Yale	W 77–59	10–10 (1–6)	30 – Ozel	9 – Austin	6 – Ozel	Leede Arena (1,001); Hanover, NH
February 7, 2026; 2:00 p.m., ESPN+		at Harvard	L 35–75	10–11 (1–7)	10 – Eldredge	6 – Austin	3 – Ozel	Lavietes Pavilion (854); Cambridge, MA
February 13, 2026; 7:00 p.m., ESPN+		at Brown	L 51–58	10–12 (1–8)	13 – Ozel	11 – MacDonald	3 – Ozel	Pizzitola Sports Center (182); Providence, RI
February 14, 2026; 5:00 p.m., ESPN+		at Yale	L 54–82	10–13 (1–9)	11 – Ozel	8 – MacDonald	4 – Ozel	John J. Lee Amphitheater (509); New Haven, CT
February 21, 2026; 2:00 p.m., ESPN+		Columbia	L 42–81	10–14 (1–10)	11 – Ozel	7 – MacDonald	2 – 3 tied	Leede Arena (923); Hanover, NH
February 27, 2026; 6:00 p.m., ESPN+		No. 25 Princeton	L 47–97	10–15 (1–11)	9 – 2 tied	6 – MacDonald	4 – Lawlor	Leede Arena (726); Hanover, NH
February 28, 2026; 5:00 p.m., ESPN+		Penn	L 66–89	10–16 (1–12)	13 – Ozel	3 – MacDonald	3 – Eldredge	Leede Arena (763); Hanover, NH
March 7, 2026; 1:00 p.m., ESPN+		at Cornell	L 53–78	10–17 (1–13)	12 – Eldredge	4 – Lawlor	3 – Ozel	Newman Arena (332); Ithaca, NY
*Non-conference game. ^{#}Rankings from AP poll. (#) Tournament seedings in parentheses. All times are in Eastern.

== See also ==
- 2025–26 Dartmouth Big Green men's basketball team
