= 2025–26 Monmouth Hawks women's basketball team =

American college basketball season

2025–26 Monmouth Hawks women's basketball
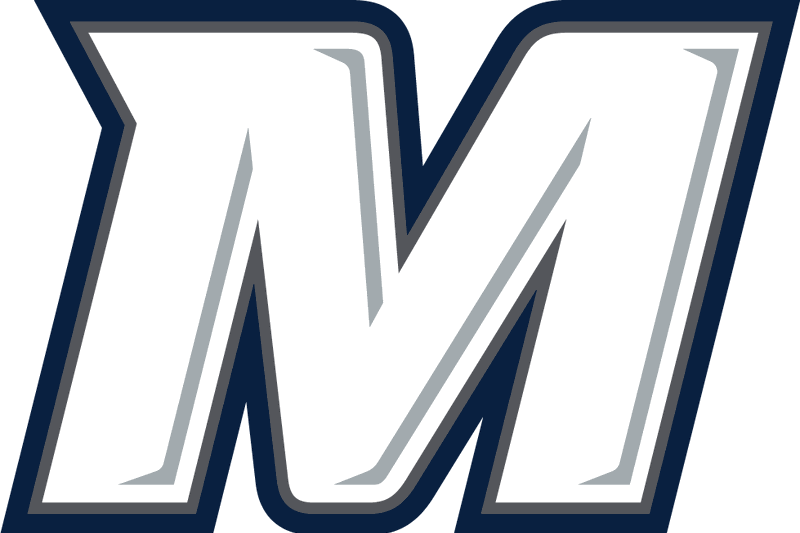

WNIT, Second Round
- Conference: Coastal Athletic Association
- Record: 21–12 (12–6 CAA)
- Head coach: Cait Wetmore (2nd season)
- Assistant coaches: Joe Haigh; Cristina Centeno; Aja Boyd
- Home arena: OceanFirst Bank Center

2025–26 CAA women's basketball standings
	Conf.				Overall
Team	W		L	PCT	W		L	PCT
Charleston †	16	–	2	.889	27	–	6	.818
Campbell	13	–	5	.722	20	–	12	.625
Drexel	13	–	5	.722	21	–	11	.656
Stony Brook	12	–	6	.667	18	–	15	.545
Monmouth	12	–	6	.667	21	–	12	.636
Elon	10	–	8	.556	16	–	16	.500
Towson	10	–	8	.556	17	–	14	.548
William & Mary	9	–	9	.500	17	–	14	.548
North Carolina A&T	7	–	11	.389	12	–	18	.400
Hofstra	6	–	12	.333	11	–	22	.333
Hampton	4	–	14	.222	10	–	21	.323
Northeastern	3	–	15	.167	7	–	22	.241
UNC Wilmington	2	–	16	.111	7	–	24	.226
† 2026 CAA tournament winner

The 2025–26 Monmouth Hawks women's basketball team represented Monmouth University during the 2025–26 NCAA Division I women's basketball season. The Hawks, led by second-year head coach Cait Wetmore, played their home games at OceanFirst Bank Center in West Long Branch, New Jersey as members of the Coastal Athletic Association.

== Previous season ==
The Hawks finished the 2024–25 season 16–15, 10–8 in CAA play, to finish in fifth place. They defeated Hampton, before falling to Drexel in the quarterfinals of the CAA tournament.

== Preseason ==
On October 2, 2025, the Coastal Athletic Association released their preseason poll. Monmouth was picked to finish eighth in the conference.

=== Preseason rankings ===
CAA Preseason Poll
Place	Team	Votes
1	Charleston	139 (8)
2	Drexel	125 (2)
3	North Carolina A&T	124 (3)
4	Campbell	112
5	Elon	87
6	William & Mary	83
7	Towson	79
8	Monmouth	71
9	Hofstra	67
10	UNC Wilmington	39
11	Hampton	37
12	Stony Brook	33
13	Northeastern	18
(#) first-place votes

=== Preseason All-CAA Teams ===
Preseason All-CAA Teams
Team	Name	Class	Position
Honorable Mention	Divine Dibula	Junior	Forward

== Roster ==
2025–26 Monmouth Hawks women's basketball team
Players
Coaches

Pos.	#	Name	Height	Year	Previous school	Hometown
G	0	Adena Webster	5 ft 8 in (1.73 m)	So	Temple	Nassau, Bahamas
G	2	Gigi Gamble	5 ft 5 in (1.65 m)	Jr	CCBC Essex	Somerset, New Jersey
F	3	Tessa Carman	5 ft 11 in (1.8 m)	Fr	Red Bank Catholic High School	Barnegat, New Jersey
G	4	Alexis Andrews	5 ft 8 in (1.73 m)	Sr	Charlotte	Montgomery, Alabama
F	5	Sydney Hendrix	5 ft 9 in (1.75 m)	Jr	Florida A&M	Farmington Hills, Michigan
G	6	Kathy Kersaint	5 ft 9 in (1.75 m)	Fr	Dawson College	Repentigny, Quebec
G	7	Isabella Murray	5 ft 9 in (1.75 m)	Jr	Blair Academy	Green Brook, New Jersey
G	8	Fatumata Djaló	5 ft 7 in (1.7 m)	So	Ole Miss	Aveiro, Portugal
G	9	Claudia Xaudaro	5 ft 7 in (1.7 m)	Fr	Escola Pia Santa Anna	Mataró, Spain
F	11	Rebecca Milon	5 ft 9 in (1.75 m)	So	Capital Courts Academy	Nepean, Ontario
F	13	Divine Dibula	6 ft 0 in (1.83 m)	Jr	Champlain College Saint-Lambert	Ottawa, Ontario
G	14	Kellyn Preira	5 ft 10 in (1.78 m)	RS So	St. Mary's High School	Peabody, Massachusetts
F	23	Ella Farrelly	6 ft 3 in (1.91 m)	Sr	King's Christian Collegiate	Guelph, Ontario
G	24	Madalena Amaro	5 ft 7 in (1.7 m)	Fr	Escola Secundária Rainha Dona Leonor	Faro, Portugal
F	40	Alexis Davis	5 ft 10 in (1.78 m)	Jr	Buffalo	Glassboro, New Jersey

Head coach

- Cait Wetmore (Adelphi)

Assistant coach(es)

- Joe Haigh (Notre Dame)
- Cristina Centeno (Siena)
- Aja Boyd (UNC Greensboro)

Legend

- (C) Team captain
- (S) Suspended
- (I) Ineligible
- (W) Walk-on
- Injured
- Current redshirt

Roster
Last update: May 16, 2026

== Schedule and results ==
Date time, TV	Rank^{#}	Opponent^{#}	Result	Record	Site (attendance) city, state
Non-conference regular season
November 3, 2025*; 7:00 pm, FloCollege		Chestnut Hill	W 81–42	1–0	OceanFirst Bank Center (460); West Long Branch, NJ
November 6, 2025*; 6:30 pm, SECN+		at No. 24т Kentucky	L 46–104	1–1	Memorial Coliseum (4,096); Lexington, KY
November 11, 2025*; 6:00 pm, DSN		at Maryland Eastern Shore	L 66–71	1–2	Hytche Athletic Center (215); Princess Anne, MD
November 20, 2025*; 7:00 pm, FloCollege		Howard	L 44–57	1–3	OceanFirst Bank Center (529); West Long Branch, NJ
November 24, 2025*; 7:00 pm, ESPN+		at Marist	W 72−64 ^{OT}	2−3	McCann Arena (476); Poughkeepsie, NY
November 29, 2025*; 2:00 pm, NECFR		at Fairleigh Dickinson	L 50−63	2−4	Bogota Savings Bank Center (395); Hackensack, NJ
December 3, 2025*; 5:00 pm, FloCollege		NJIT	W 77–68	3–4	OceanFirst Bank Center (547); West Long Branch, NJ
December 7, 2025*; 7:00 pm, ESPN+		at Saint Peter's	W 66–38	4–4	Run Baby Run Arena (258); Jersey City, NJ
December 18, 2025*; 11:30 am, FloCollege/NBCSP/SNY/The Wax		Yale	W 50–46 ^{OT}	5–4	OceanFirst Bank Center (1,061); West Long Branch, NJ
December 20, 2025*; 2:00 pm, FloCollege		Cheyney	W 101–53	6–4	OceanFirst Bank Center (206); West Long Branch, NJ
December 21, 2025*; 12:00 pm, ESPN+		at Brown	Canceled due to the 2025 Brown University shooting		Pizzitola Sports Center; Providence, RI
December 29, 2025*; 5:00 pm, FloCollege		Georgian Court	W 74−40	7−4	OceanFirst Bank Center (661); West Long Branch, NJ
CAA regular season
January 2, 2026; 7:00 pm, FloCollege		at Elon	W 77–62	8–4 (1–0)	Schar Center (612); Elon, NC
January 4, 2026; 1:00 pm, FloCollege		at North Carolina A&T	W 61–55	9–4 (2–0)	Corbett Sports Center (416); Greensboro, NC
January 9, 2026; 2:00 pm, FloCollege/SNY		UNC Wilmington	W 52–50	10–4 (3–0)	OceanFirst Bank Center (337); West Long Branch, NJ
January 11, 2026; 1:00 pm, FloCollege		at Northeastern	L 67–72	10–5 (3–1)	Cabot Center (287); Boston, MA
January 16, 2026; 7:00 pm, FloCollege		at Towson	W 56–53	11–5 (4–1)	SECU Arena (616); Towson, MD
January 18, 2026; 2:00 pm, FloCollege/SNY		Campbell	W 72–31	12–5 (5–1)	OceanFirst Bank Center (718); West Long Branch, NJ
January 25, 2026; 2:00 pm, FloCollege		Northeastern	Postponed due to Winter Storm Fern		OceanFirst Bank Center; West Long Branch, NJ
January 28, 2026; 11:00 am, FloCollege/SNY		Northeastern; Rescheduled from January 25	W 65–56	13–5 (6–1)	OceanFirst Bank Center (291); West Long Branch, NJ
January 30, 2026; 7:00 pm, FloCollege		Drexel	L 53–56	13–6 (6–2)	OceanFirst Bank Center (569); West Long Branch, NJ
February 1, 2026; 1:00 pm, FloCollege		at Stony Brook	L 51–61	13–7 (6–3)	Stony Brook Arena (845); Stony Brook, NY
February 6, 2026; 6:00 pm, FloCollege		at Hofstra	W 59–54	14–7 (7–3)	Mack Sports Complex (487); Hempstead, NY
February 8, 2026; 1:00 pm, FloCollege		at Drexel	W 62–60 ^{2OT}	15–7 (8–3)	Daskalakis Athletic Center (509); Philadelphia, PA
February 13, 2026; 7:00 pm, FloCollege/SNY		Stony Brook	L 60–68	15–8 (8–4)	OceanFirst Bank Center (648); West Long Branch, NJ
February 15, 2026; 2:00 pm, FloCollege/SNY		Charleston	W 69–57	16–8 (9–4)	OceanFirst Bank Center (1,781); West Long Branch, NJ
February 20, 2026; 7:00 pm, FloCollege		at William & Mary	W 63–58	17–8 (10–4)	Kaplan Arena (1,067); Williamsburg, VA
February 22, 2026; 12:00 pm, FloCollege		at Hampton	W 64–57	18–8 (11–4)	Hampton Convocation Center (238); Hampton, VA
February 27, 2026; 7:00 pm, FloCollege		North Carolina A&T	L 65–71	18–9 (11–5)	OceanFirst Bank Center (850); West Long Branch, NJ
March 1, 2026; 3:00 pm, FloCollege		Hofstra	L 44–45	18–10 (11–6)	OceanFirst Bank Center (811); West Long Branch, NJ
March 5, 2026; 7:00 pm, FloCollege		Towson	W 83–77	19–10 (12–6)	OceanFirst Bank Center (542); West Long Branch, NJ
CAA tournament
March 12, 2026; 2:30 pm, FloCollege	(5)	vs. (13) UNC Wilmington; Second Round	W 72–61	20–10	CareFirst Arena (1,550); Washington, D.C.
March 13, 2026; 2:30 pm, FloCollege	(5)	vs. (4) Stony Brook; Quarterfinals	L 45–51	20–11	CareFirst Arena (1,300); Washington, D.C.
WNIT
March 19, 2026*; 6:00 pm, FloCollege/NBCSP		Lehigh; First Round	W 72–62	21–11	OceanFirst Bank Center (277); West Long Branch, NJ
March 23, 2026*; 7:00 pm, ESPN+		at Cleveland State; Second Round	L 68–74	21–12	Wolstein Center (484); Cleveland, OH
*Non-conference game. ^{#}Rankings from AP Poll. (#) Tournament seedings in parentheses. All times are in Eastern.
