= 2025–26 Harvard Crimson women's basketball team =

American college basketball season

2025–26 Harvard Crimson women's basketball

WBIT, Quarterfinals
- Conference: Ivy League
- Record: 20–12 (10–4 Ivy)
- Head coach: Carrie Moore (4th season)
- Assistant coaches: Ali Sanders; Steve Harney; Ariel Gaston
- Home arena: Lavietes Pavilion

2025–26 Ivy League women's basketball standings
	Conf.				Overall
Team	W		L	PCT	W		L	PCT
Princeton †	12	–	2	.857	26	–	4	.867
Columbia	11	–	3	.786	25	–	8	.758
Harvard	10	–	4	.714	20	–	12	.625
Brown	8	–	6	.571	16	–	11	.593
Penn	7	–	7	.500	17	–	10	.630
Cornell	4	–	10	.286	9	–	18	.333
Yale	3	–	11	.214	7	–	20	.259
Dartmouth	1	–	13	.071	10	–	17	.370
† 2026 Ivy League tournament winner

The 2025–26 Harvard Crimson women's basketball team represents Harvard University during the 2025–26 NCAA Division I women's basketball season. The Crimson, led by fourth-year head coach Carrie Moore, play their home games at the Lavietes Pavilion in Cambridge, Massachusetts as members of the Ivy League.

== Previous season ==
The Crimson finished the 2024–25 24–5 and 11–3 in Ivy League play to clinch the No. 3 seed and make the Ivy League tournament. They beat No. 2 Princeton by three points in the semifinals before beating No. 1 Columbia, also by three points, in the championship game to become Ivy League champions for the first time. They went onto the NCAA tournament, where they lost in the first round to Michigan State.

== Offseason ==
=== Departures ===
Harvard Departures
Name	Num	Pos.	Height	Year	Hometown	Reason for Departure
Mona Zaric	4	F	6'2"	Senior	Novi Sad, Serbia	Graduated
Elena Rodriguez	10	G	6'2"	Senior	Aguimes, Spain	Graduated
Harmoni Turner	14	G	5'10"	Senior	Mansfield, TX	Graduated; drafted 35th overall by the Las Vegas Aces in the 2025 WNBA draft

=== Recruiting class ===
College recruiting
Name	Hometown	School	Height	Weight	Commit date
Aubrey Shaw; G	Overland Park, KS	Blue Valley North	6 ft 2 in (1.88 m)	N/A	
Aubrey Shaw; G	Recruit ratings: ESPN: (93)				
Overall recruit ranking:
Note: In many cases, Scout, Rivals, 247Sports, On3, and ESPN may conflict in their listings of height and weight.; In these cases, the average was taken. ESPN grades are on a 100-point scale.; Sources: "2025 Player Commits". ESPN. Archived from the original on November 11, 2023.

== Roster ==
2025–26 Harvard Crimson women's basketball team
Players
Coaches

Pos.	#	Name	Height	Year	Previous school	Hometown
G	0	Olivia Jones	5 ft 10 in (1.78 m)	Fr	Westtown High School	Harrisburg, PA
G	1	Aubrey Shaw	6 ft 2 in (1.88 m)	Fr	Blue Valley North High School	Overland Park, KS
F	3	Asani Ceaser	6 ft 0 in (1.83 m)	So	Centennial High School	Las Vegas, NV
G	5	Gabby Anderson	5 ft 11 in (1.8 m)	Sr	IMG Academy	Columbus, OH
G	6	Lydia Chatira	6 ft 0 in (1.83 m)	So	ACS Athens	Pikermi, Greece
G	11	Alayna Rocco	5 ft 10 in (1.78 m)	So	North Catholic High School	Pittsburgh, PA
G	12	Karlee White (C)	5 ft 9 in (1.75 m)	Jr	Oak Park High School	Burbank, CA
F	13	Hana Belibi	5 ft 0 in (1.52 m)	So	Regis Jesuit High School	Englewood, CO
F/C	15	Maya Nahar	6 ft 4 in (1.93 m)	Fr	Western Reserve Academy	Paramaribo, Suriname
G/F	21	Ava Krumwiede	6 ft 1 in (1.85 m)	Fr	Harpeth Hall	Nashville, TN
G	22	Saniyah Glenn-Bello	6 ft 0 in (1.83 m)	Sr	Christ the King High School	Staten Island, NY
G	23	Nina Emnace	5 ft 7 in (1.7 m)	So	Trinity Hall	Toms River, NJ
F	24	Mary Hollensteiner	6 ft 1 in (1.85 m)	Jr	Stone Ridge School of the Sacred Heart	Bethesda, MD
G/F	25	Sam Wills	6 ft 0 in (1.83 m)	Fr	Visitation High School	Mendota Heights, MN
F	31	Katie Krupa	6 ft 1 in (1.85 m)	Sr	Morton High School	Morton, IL
G/F	40	Abigail Wright (C)	6 ft 1 in (1.85 m)	Jr	Newton North High School	Newton, MA

Head coach

- Carrie Moore (Western Michigan)

Assistant coach(es)

- Ali Sanders (Southeastern)
- Steve Harney (Dickinson)
- Ariel Gaston (New Hampshire)

Legend

- (C) Team captain
- (S) Suspended
- (I) Ineligible
- (W) Walk-on
- Injured
- Current redshirt

Roster

== Schedule and results ==
Date time, TV	Rank^{#}	Opponent^{#}	Result	Record	High points	High rebounds	High assists	Site (attendance) city, state
Non-conference regular season
November 7, 2025*; 8:00 p.m., ESPN+		St. John's	W 61–56	1–0	16 – White	9 – Anderson	2 – Wright	Lavietes Pavilion (658); Cambridge, MA
November 9, 2025*; 12:00 p.m., B1G+		at No. 13 Michigan	L 55–84	1–1	17 – Wright	9 – Wright	2 – Wright	Crisler Center (3,348); Ann Arbor, MI
November 11, 2025*; 6:00 p.m., ESPN+		at UMass	L 55–68	1–2	12 – White	11 – Anderson	5 – Wright	Mullins Center (978); Amherst, MA
November 15, 2025*; 8:30 p.m., ESPN+		vs. Oakland; Raising The B.A.R. Invitational semifinals	W 93–55	2–2	17 – Emnace	6 – Wright	4 – Tied	Haas Pavilion (137); Berkeley, CA
November 16, 2025*; 10:00 p.m., ACCNX		vs. California; Raising The B.A.R. Invitational championship	L 65–76	2–3	23 – Wright	7 – Tied	3 – Glenn-Bello	Haas Pavilion (1,019); Berkeley, CA
November 19, 2025*; 6:00 p.m., ACCNX		at Boston College	W 72–65 ^{OT}	3–3	23 – Wright	13 – Wright	6 – Glenn-Bello	Conte Forum (817); Boston, MA
November 24, 2025*; 6:30 p.m., FloSports		vs. Alabama; Pink Flamingo Championship Junkanoo Division semifinal	L 60–80	3–4	16 – Tied	10 – Glenn-Bello	7 – Glenn-Bello	Baha Mar Convention Center (317); Nassau, The Bahamas
November 26, 2025*; 6:30 p.m., FloSports		vs. South Florida; Pink Flamingo Championship Junkanoo Division consolation	L 54–56	3–5	17 – Glenn-Bello	17 – Anderson	3 – Krupa	Baha Mar Convention Center; Nassau, The Bahamas
November 30, 2025*; 1:30 p.m., SECN+		at Arkansas	W 69–51	4–5	15 – Tied	9 – Shaw	6 – Krupa	Bud Walton Arena (2,310); Fayetteville, AR
December 3, 2025*; 7:00 p.m., ESPN+		Holy Cross	W 61–46	5–5	14 – Glenn-Bello	8 – Wright	6 – Krupa	Lavietes Pavilion (532); Cambridge, MA
December 5, 2025*; 11:00 a.m., NESN		Stony Brook	W 67–33	6–5	22 – Wright	11 – Jones	9 – Glenn-Bello	Lavietes Pavilion (1,147); Cambridge, MA
December 21, 2025*; 12:00 p.m., ESPN+		Maine	L 57–59	6–6	22 – Wright	9 – Wright	2 – Glenn-Bello	Lavietes Pavilion (676); Cambridge, MA
December 29, 2025*; 1:00 p.m., ESPN+		Delaware	W 70–63	7–6	20 – Glenn-Bello	7 – White	4 – Krupa	Lavietes Pavilion (717); Cambridge, MA
Ivy League regular season
January 3, 2026; 2:00 p.m., ESPN+		at Dartmouth	W 72–47	8–6 (1–0)	14 – Wright	9 – Wright	4 – Jones	Leede Arena; Hanover, NH
January 10, 2026; 2:00 p.m., ESPN+		Columbia	L 55–58	8–7 (1–1)	20 – Wright	8 – Jones	4 – Krupa	Lavietes Pavilion (1,636); Cambridge, MA
January 17, 2026; 2:00 p.m., ESPN+		at Penn	W 53–42	9–7 (2–1)	14 – Wright	10 – Wright	5 – Jones	Palestra (446); Philadelphia, PA
January 19, 2026; 2:00 p.m., ESPN+		at No. 20 Princeton	L 79–82 ^{OT}	9–8 (2–2)	27 – White	10 – White	4 – Wright	Jadwin Gymnasium (1,857); Princeton, NJ
January 24, 2026; 1:00 p.m., ESPN+		at Cornell	W 84–38	10–8 (3–2)	22 – Hollensteiner	5 – Glenn-Bello	10 – Jones	Newman Arena (312); Ithaca, NY
January 30, 2026; 7:00 p.m., ESPN+		Yale	W 72–44	11–8 (4–2)	19 – White	12 – Jones	4 – Tied	Lavietes Pavilion (982); Cambridge, MA
January 31, 2026; 7:00 p.m., ESPN+		Brown	W 61–58	12–8 (5–2)	21 – White	8 – Wright	6 – Jones	Lavietes Pavilion (861); Cambridge, MA
February 7, 2026; 2:00 p.m., ESPN+		Dartmouth	W 75–35	13–8 (6–2)	15 – Shaw	7 – Jones	4 – Glenn-Bello	Lavietes Pavilion (854); Cambridge, MA
February 13, 2026; 6:00 p.m., ESPN+		at Yale	W 70–62	14–8 (7–2)	35 – White	6 – Wright	7 – Krupa	John J. Lee Amphitheater (571); New Haven, CT
February 14, 2026; 5:00 p.m., ESPN+		at Brown	L 62–68	14–9 (7–3)	29 – Wright	9 – Jones	4 – White	Pizzitola Sports Center (242); Providence, RI
February 21, 2026; 4:00 p.m., ESPN+		Cornell	W 74–37	15–9 (8–3)	24 – White	9 – Jones	7 – Jones	Lavietes Pavilion (766); Cambridge, MA
February 27, 2026; 7:00 p.m., ESPN+		Penn	W 60–46	16–9 (9–3)	14 – Wright	10 – Wright	5 – Krupa	Lavietes Pavilion (635); Cambridge, MA
February 28, 2026; 7:00 p.m., ESPN+		No. 25 Princeton	L 49–62	16–10 (9–4)	10 – White	9 – Jones	3 – Krupa	Lavietes Pavilion (1,636); Cambridge, MA
March 7, 2026; 2:00 p.m., ESPN+		at Columbia	W 68–64	17–10 (10–4)	24 – White	9 – White	4 – Krupa	Levien Gymnasium (2,647); New York, NY
[[2026 Ivy League women's basketball tournament|Ivy League tournament]]
March 13, 2026; 4:30 p.m., ESPN+	(3)	vs. (2) Columbia; Semifinals	W 67–65 ^{OT}	18–10	18 – Wright	9 – Jones	3 – White	Newman Arena (788); Ithaca, NY
March 14, 2026; 5:30 p.m., ESPNU	(3)	vs. (1) No. 23 Princeton; Championship	L 53–63	18–11	15 – White	8 – Tied	4 – Krupa	Newman Arena (698); Ithaca, NY
[[2026 Women's Basketball Invitation Tournament|WBIT]]
March 19, 2026*; 7:00 p.m., ESPN+	(4)	Navy; First Round	W 73–52	19–11	19 – White	6 – Jones	3 – Tied	Lavietes Pavilion (239); Cambridge, MA
March 22, 2026*; 2:00 p.m., ESPN+	(4)	Eastern Kentucky; Second Round	W 63–34	20–11	15 – Krupa	10 – Wright	5 – Jones	Lavietes Pavilion (252); Cambridge, MA
March 26, 2026*; 7:30 p.m., ESPN+	(4)	at (3) Wisconsin; Quarterfinals	L 61–64	20–12	–	–	–	Kohl Center; Madison, WI
*Non-conference game. ^{#}Rankings from AP Poll. (#) Tournament seedings in parentheses. All times are in Eastern Time.

== See also ==
- 2025–26 Harvard Crimson men's basketball team
