= Penn Quakers women's basketball =

| 2026–27 Penn Quakers women's basketball team |
- University: University of Pennsylvania
- First season: 1970; 56 years ago
- Head coach: Mike McLaughlin (18th season)
- Location: Philadelphia, Pennsylvania
- Arena: The Palestra (capacity: 8,722)
- Conference: Ivy League
- Nickname: Quakers
- Colors: Red and blue
- Student section: The QuakeZone
- All-time record: 503–637 (.441)

NCAA Division I tournament appearances
- 2001, 2004, 2014, 2016, 2017

Conference tournament champions
- 2017

Conference regular-season champions
- 2001, 2004, 2014, 2016, 2017, 2019

Uniforms
| Home | Away |

The Penn Quakers women's basketball team is the intercollegiate women's basketball program representing University of Pennsylvania. The school competes in the Ivy League in Division I of the National Collegiate Athletic Association (NCAA). The Quakers play home basketball games at the Palestra in Philadelphia, Pennsylvania.

== History ==
The Quakers have a 562–654 as of the 2017–18 season. They have won five Ivy League titles (2001, 2004, 2014, 2016, 2017). They were the champion of the first Ivy League women's basketball tournament in 2017, beating Princeton 57–49. Penn won the Big 5 in 2015.

| Season | Record | Conference record | Coach |
|---|---|---|---|
| 1970–71 | 4–6 | n/a | No coach |
| 1971–72 | 2–8 | n/a | No coach |
| 1972–73 | 2–6 | n/a | No coach |
| 1973–74 | 5–4 | n/a | Marie Darlington |
| 1974–75 | 10–6 | n/a | Connie Van Housen |
| 1975–76 | 8–10 | n/a | Lois Ashley |
| 1976–77 | 13–9 | n/a | Lois Ashley |
| 1977–78 | 10–14 | n/a | Lois Ashley |
| 1978–79 | 9–15 | n/a | Lois Ashley |
| 1979–80 | 13–3 | 5–2 (3rd) | Lois Ashley |
| 1980–81 | 12–14 | 5–2 (T-4th) | Lois Ashley |
| 1981–82 | 13–11 | 5–1 (T-1st) | Lois Ashley |
| 1982–83 | 16–13 | 8–4 (2nd) | Lois Ashley |
| 1983–84 | 12–14 | 8–4 (2nd) | Lois Ashley |
| 1984–85 | 11–15 | 6–6 (4th) | Lois Ashley |
| 1985–86 | 4–21 | 3–9 (T-6th) | Lois Ashley |
| 1986–87 | 7–19 | 5–9 (6th) | Lois Ashley |
| 1987–88 | 6–20 | 5–9 (T-5th) | Marianne Stanley |
| 1988–89 | 5–21 | 3–11 (7th) | Marianne Stanley |
| 1989–90 | 10–16 | 7–7 (T-4th) | Julie Soriero |
| 1990–91 | 15–11 | 10–4 (T-2nd) | Julie Soriero |
| 1991–92 | 9–17 | 6–8 (3rd) | Julie Soriero |
| 1992–93 | 8–18 | 6–8 (T-5th) | Julie Soriero |
| 1993–94 | 10–16 | 6–8 (5th) | Julie Soriero |
| 1994–95 | 11–15 | 8–6 (T-3rd) | Julie Soriero |
| 1995–96 | 3–23 | 3–11 (7th) | Julie Soriero |
| 1996–97 | 6–20 | 2–12 (8th) | Julie Soriero |
| 1997–98 | 13–13 | 8–6 (T-4th) | Julie Soriero |
| 1998–99 | 12–14 | 8–6 (3rd) | Julie Soriero |
| 1999-00 | 18–10 | 9–5 (T-2nd) | Kelly Greenberg |
| 2000–01 | 22–6 | 14–0 (1st) | Kelly Greenberg |
| 2001–02 | 12–15 | 8–6 (T-2nd) | Kelly Greenberg |
| 2002–03 | 15–12 | 9–5 (T-2nd) | Kelly Greenberg |
| 2003–04 | 17–11 | 11–3 (1st) | Kelly Greenberg |
| 2004–05 | 15–12 | 8–6 (4th) | Patrick Knapp |
| 2005–06 | 5–22 | 3–11 (6th) | Patrick Knapp |
| 2006–07 | 12–15 | 7–7 (T-4th) | Patrick Knapp |
| 2007–08 | 7–22 | 4–10 (T-6th) | Patrick Knapp |
| 2008–09 | 9–19 | 6–8 (T-4th) | Patrick Knapp |
| 2009–10 | 2–26 | 1–13 (8th) | Mike McLaughlin |
| 2010–11 | 11–17 | 5–9 (6th) | Mike McLaughlin |
| 2011–12 | 13–15 | 6–8 (5th) | Mike McLaughlin |
| 2012–13 | 18–13 | 9–5 (3rd) | Mike McLaughlin |
| 2013–14 | 22–7 | 12–2 (1st) | Mike McLaughlin |
| 2014–15 | 21–9 | 11–3 (2nd) | Mike McLaughlin |
| 2015–16 | 24–5 | 13–1 (1st) | Mike McLaughlin |
| 2016–17 | 22–8 | 13–1 (1st) | Mike McLaughlin |
| 2017–18 | 22–9 | 11–3 (2nd) | Mike McLaughlin |
| 2018–19 | 22–5 | 12–2 (T-1st) | Mike McLaughlin |
| 2019–20 | 20-7 | 10-4 (2nd) | Mike McLaughlin |
| 2020–21 | Season Cancelled Due to Covid | | |
| 2021-22 | 12-14 | 7-7 (T-4th) | Mike McLaughlin |
| 2022-23 | 17-12 | 9-5 (T-3rd) | Mike McLaughlin |
| 2023-24 | 15-13 | 7-7 (T-4th) | Mike McLaughlin |
| 2024-25 | 15-13 | 6-8 (T-4th) | Mike McLaughlin |

== Postseason appearances ==
Penn has gone to the NCAA Division I women's basketball tournament five times. The Quakers are 0–5.

| Year | Round | Opponent | Result |
|---|---|---|---|
| 2001 | First Round | Texas Tech | L 57–100 |
| 2004 | First Round | Connecticut | L 55–91 |
| 2014 | First Round | Texas | L 61–79 |
| 2016 | First Round | Washington | L 53–65 |
| 2017 | First Round | Texas A&M | L 61–63 |
