= 2025–26 Princeton Tigers women's basketball team =

Intercollegiate basketball season

2025–26 Princeton Tigers women's basketball

Ivy League regular season and tournament champions

NCAA tournament, First Round
- Conference: Ivy League

Ranking
- Coaches: No. 23
- AP: No. 23
- Record: 26–4 (12–2 Ivy)
- Head coach: Carla Berube (7th season)
- Assistant coaches: Lauren Battista (7th season); Lauren Dillon (7th season); Jordan Edwards (2nd season)
- Home arena: Jadwin Gymnasium

2025–26 Ivy League women's basketball standings
	Conf.				Overall
Team	W		L	PCT	W		L	PCT
Princeton †	12	–	2	.857	26	–	4	.867
Columbia	11	–	3	.786	25	–	8	.758
Harvard	10	–	4	.714	20	–	12	.625
Brown	8	–	6	.571	16	–	11	.593
Penn	7	–	7	.500	17	–	10	.630
Cornell	4	–	10	.286	9	–	18	.333
Yale	3	–	11	.214	7	–	20	.259
Dartmouth	1	–	13	.071	10	–	17	.370
† 2026 Ivy League tournament winner

The 2025–26 Princeton Tigers women's basketball team represented Princeton University during the 2025–26 NCAA Division I women's basketball season. The Tigers, led by seventh-year head coach Carla Berube, played their home games at Jadwin Gymnasium in Princeton, New Jersey as members of the Ivy League.

At the conclusion of the 26–4 season, when the team were both Ivy League regular season and tournament champions, coach Berube moved on to coach at Northwestern. Associate coach Lauren Gosselin then became head coach.

== Previous season ==
The Tigers finished the 2024–25 with a 21–8 overall record, and 12–2 in Ivy League play, to finish in 2nd place as the conference's regular season champion. As the top seed in the Ivy League tournament, they lost by three in the semifinal game to No. 3 seed Harvard. They earned an at-large bid to the NCAA tournament, where they were eliminated in the first round by Iowa State.

== Offseason ==
=== Departures ===
Princeton Departures
Name	Num	Pos.	Height	Year	Hometown	Reason for Departure
Adaora Nwokeji	1	G	5'8"	Senior	Houston, TX	Graduated
Tabitha Amanze	3	F	6'4"	Junior	Ogun, Nigeria	Transferred to Virginia
Paige Morton	5	F	6'3"	Senior	Summit, NJ	Graduated
Parker Hill	22	F	6'4"	Senior	Bethesda, MD	Graduated
Amelia Osgood	32	G	5'9"	Senior	Brentwood, TN	Graduated
Katie Thiers	44	F	6'2"	Senior	Seattle, WA	Graduated

=== Transfers ===
There were no transfers for the season.

=== Recruiting class ===
There was no college recruiting class for the class of 2025.

== Roster ==
2025–26 Princeton Tigers women's basketball team
Players
Coaches

Pos.	#	Name	Height	Year	Previous school	Hometown
F	1	Emily Eadie	6 ft 0 in (1.83 m)	So	Sage Hill School	Newport Beach, CA
G/F	2	Olivia Hutcherson	5 ft 11 in (1.8 m)	Jr	Holy Innocents' Episcopal School	Johns Creek, GA
G	3	Cristina Parrella	5 ft 10 in (1.78 m)	So	Saddle River Day School	Closter, NJ
G	4	Grace O'Sullivan	6 ft 0 in (1.83 m)	Fr	Rivers School	Acton, MA
G/F	5	Fadima Tall	6 ft 0 in (1.83 m)	Jr	Georgetown Visitation Prep	Silver Spring, MD
F	8	Sarah Lessig	6 ft 2 in (1.88 m)	Fr	Garfield High School	Seattle, WA
G	10	Skye Belker	5 ft 9 in (1.75 m)	Jr	Windward School	Los Angeles, CA
F	11	Taylor Charles	6 ft 2 in (1.88 m)	Sr	Burlington Central High School	Elgin, IL
G	13	Ashley Chea	5 ft 8 in (1.73 m)	Jr	Flintridge Prep	Los Angeles, CA
G	21	Toby Nweke	5 ft 9 in (1.75 m)	So	Georgetown Visitation Prep	Woodbine, MA
G	23	Madison St. Rose	5 ft 10 in (1.78 m)	Sr	St. John Vianney High School	Old Bridge, NJ

Head coach

- Carla Berube (Connecticut)

Assistant coach(es)

- Lauren Battista (Bentley)
- Lauren Dillon (Tufts)
- Jordan Edwards (High Point)

Legend

- (C) Team captain
- (S) Suspended
- (I) Ineligible
- (W) Walk-on
- Injured
- Current redshirt

Roster
Last update: November 9, 2025

== Schedule and results ==
Date time, TV	Rank^{#}	Opponent^{#}	Result	Record	High points	High rebounds	High assists	Site (attendance) city, state
Non-conference regular season
November 9, 2025*; 2:00 p.m., ACCNX/ESPN+		at Georgia Tech	W 67–61	1–0	16 – Tall	14 – Tall	4 – St. Rose	McCamish Pavilion (1,809); Atlanta, GA
November 12, 2025*; 7:00 p.m., ESPN+		at Villanova	W 73–68	2–0	21 – Tall	9 – Tied	3 – Tied	Finneran Pavilion (1,051); Villanova, PA
November 16, 2025*; 1:00 p.m., B1G+		at No. 9 Maryland	L 68–84	2–1	20 – St. Rose	8 – Hutcherson	4 – Tied	Xfinity Center (6,748); College Park, GA
November 19, 2025*; 7:00 p.m., ESPN+		Rice	W 69–56	3–1	19 – St. Rose	6 – Tall	5 – Belker	Jadwin Gymnasium (657); Princeton, NJ
November 22, 2025*; 1:00 p.m., ESPN+		vs. Penn State; Battle 4 Atlantis semifinals	W 100–93	4–1	27 – Belker	10 – St. Rose	7 – Chea	Baha Mar Convention Center (218); Nassau, The Bahamas
November 23, 2025*; 12:00 p.m., ESPN+		vs. UMES; Battle 4 Atlantis championship	W 81–62	5–1	18 – Chea	6 – Tied	6 – Chea	Baha Mar Convention Center (226); Nassau, The Bahamas
November 26, 2025*; 1:00 p.m., ESPN+		at Rhode Island	W 67–59	6–1	21 – St. Rose	13 – St. Rose	3 – Hutcherson	Ryan Center (1,029); Kingston, RI
November 30, 2025*; 1:00 p.m., ESPN+		DePaul	W 71–41	7–1	22 – Chea	9 – Charles	5 – Belker	Jadwin Gymnasium (779); Princeton, NJ
December 2, 2025*; 7:00 p.m., ESPN+		Seton Hall	W 82–78	8–1	26 – Belker	9 – St. Rose	6 – Chea	Jadwin Gymnasium (665); Princeton, NJ
December 6, 2025*; 2:00 p.m., ESPN+		at Belmont	W 70–58	9–1	19 – Hutcherson	11 – Tied	3 – Tied	Curb Event Center (755); Nashville, TN
December 10, 2025*; 7:30 p.m., ESPN+		Rutgers; Rivalry	W 81–63	10–1	28 – Tall	4 – Tied	3 – Tied	Jadwin Gymnasium (1,186); Princeton, NJ
December 20, 2025*; 1:00 p.m., ESPN+	No. 25	at George Mason	W 71–69 ^{OT}	11–1	19 – St. Rose	10 – Tall	5 – Chea	EagleBank Arena (1,186); Fairfax, VA
December 22, 2025*; 11:30 a.m., ESPN+	No. 25	Temple	W 87–77	12–1	22 – St. Rose	5 – Tall	4 – Tied	Jadwin Gymnasium (3,000); Princeton, NJ
Ivy League regular season
January 3, 2026; 2:00 p.m., ESPN+	No. 25	at Penn	W 74–68	13–1 (1–0)	20 – Hutcherson	8 – Tall	3 – Tied	The Palestra (992); Philadelphia, PA
January 10, 2026; 2:00 p.m., ESPN+	No. 24	at Yale	W 76–50	14–1 (2–0)	18 – St. Rose	7 – Hutcherson	5 – St. Rose	John J. Lee Amphitheater (557); New Haven, CT
January 17, 2026; 2:00 p.m., ESPN+	No. 22	Dartmouth	W 69–41	15–1 (3–0)	16 – Chea	10 – Eadie	3 – Eadie	Jadwin Gymnasium (1,232); Princeton, NJ
January 19, 2026; 2:00 p.m., ESPN+	No. 20	Harvard	W 82–79 ^{OT}	16–1 (4–0)	19 – Tied	9 – Tall	3 – Tall	Jadwin Gymnasium (1,857); Princeton, NJ
January 24, 2026; 12:00 p.m., ESPN+	No. 20	at Brown	W 58–49	17–1 (5–0)	12 – Tall	8 – Tall	7 – Chea	Pizzitola Sports Center (328); Providence, RI
January 30, 2026; 6:00 p.m., ESPNU	No. 19	Columbia	L 67–73	17–2 (5–1)	17 – Tied	10 – Hutcherson	4 – St. Rose	Jadwin Gymnasium (1,424); Princeton, NJ
January 31, 2026; 5:00 p.m., ESPN+	No. 19	Cornell	W 72–61	18–2 (6–1)	20 – Tied	9 – Tall	5 – Tied	Jadwin Gymnasium (1,734); Princeton, NJ
February 6, 2026; 7:00 p.m., ESPN+	No. 23	Penn	W 69–50	19–2 (7–1)	19 – Hutcherson	7 – Tied	6 – St. Rose	Jadwin Gymnasium (917); Princeton, NJ
February 13, 2026; 6:00 p.m., ESPNU	No. 24	at Columbia	L 56–70	19–3 (7–2)	16 – Tall	7 – Hutcherson	5 – Chea	Levien Gymnasium (2,014); New York, NY
February 14, 2026; 5:00 p.m., ESPN+	No. 24	at Cornell	W 59–38	20–3 (8–2)	15 – St. Rose	7 – St. Rose	4 – Chea	Newman Arena (216); Ithaca, NY
February 21, 2026; 5:30 p.m., ESPN+		Brown	W 69–37	21–3 (9–2)	30 – St. Rose	13 – Tall	6 – Chea	Jadwin Gymnasium (1,661); Princeton, NJ
February 27, 2026; 6:00 p.m., ESPN+	No. 25	at Dartmouth	W 97–47	22–3 (10–2)	13 – Tied	10 – Charles	9 – Chea	Leede Arena (726); Hanover, NH
February 28, 2026; 7:00 p.m., ESPN+	No. 25	at Harvard	W 62–49	23–3 (11–2)	18 – Tall	9 – Tall	2 – Chea	Lavietes Pavilion (1,636); Cambridge, MA
March 7, 2026; 2:00 p.m., ESPN+	No. 23	Yale	W 78–55	24–3 (12–2)	22 – Tall	5 – Tall	5 – Chea	Jadwin Gymnasium (1,438); Princeton, NJ
[[2026 Ivy League women's basketball tournament|Ivy League tournament]]
March 13, 2026; 7:30 p.m., ESPN+	(1) No. 23	vs. (4) Brown; Semifinals	W 65–51	25–3	18 – St. Rose	10 – Tall	5 – Chea	Newman Arena (788); Ithaca, NY
March 14, 2026; 5:30 p.m., ESPNU	(1) No. 23	vs. (3) Harvard; Championship	W 63–53	26–3	20 – Tall	7 – Tall	5 – Belker	Newman Arena (698); Ithaca, NY
NCAA tournament
March 21, 2026; 7:30 p.m., ESPN2	(9 S2) No. 23	vs. (8 S2) Oklahoma State; First round	L 68–82	26–4	17 – St. Rose	7 – Tall	5 – Hutcherson	Pauley Pavilion (5,277); Los Angeles, CA
*Non-conference game. ^{#}Rankings from AP Poll. (#) Tournament seedings in parentheses. S2=Sacramento 2. All times are in Eastern Time.

== Rankings ==
Ranking movements Legend: ██ Increase in ranking ██ Decrease in ranking — = Not ranked RV = Received votes
	Week																				
Poll	Pre	1	2	3	4	5	6	7	8	9	10	11	12	13	14	15	16	17	18	19	Final
AP	RV	RV	RV	RV	RV	RV	25	25	25*	24	22	20	19	23	24	RV	25	23	23	23	
Coaches	RV	—	—	RV	RV	RV	RV	RV	RV	RV	24	20	19	24	24	RV	RV	24	23	23	

*AP did not release a week 8 poll.

== See also ==
- 2025–26 Princeton Tigers men's basketball team
