= 2026 Ivy League women's basketball tournament =

American college basketball tournament

- Classification: Division I
- Season: 2025–26
- Teams: 4
- Site: Newman Arena; Ithaca, New York
- Champions: Princeton (6th title)
- Winning coach: Carla Berube (4th title)
- Television: ESPNU, ESPN+

2025–26 Ivy League women's basketball standings
	Conf.				Overall
Team	W		L	PCT	W		L	PCT
Princeton †	12	–	2	.857	26	–	4	.867
Columbia	11	–	3	.786	25	–	8	.758
Harvard	10	–	4	.714	20	–	12	.625
Brown	8	–	6	.571	16	–	11	.593
Penn	7	–	7	.500	17	–	10	.630
Cornell	4	–	10	.286	9	–	18	.333
Yale	3	–	11	.214	7	–	20	.259
Dartmouth	1	–	13	.071	10	–	17	.370
† 2026 Ivy League tournament winner

The 2026 Ivy League Women's Basketball Tournament, popularly referred to as "Ivy Madness", was the postseason women's basketball tournament for the Ivy League of the 2025–26 NCAA Division I women's basketball season. It was held on March 13 and 14, 2026, at the Newman Arena on the campus of Cornell University in Ithaca, New York. Princeton won their sixth title and received the Ivy League's automatic bid to the 2026 NCAA Tournament.

== Seeds ==
The top four teams in the Ivy League regular-season standings qualified for the tournament and will be seeded according to their records in conference play, resulting in a Shaughnessy playoff. If a tie for any of the top four positions exists, tiebreakers are applied in the following order:

- Head-to-head record between teams involved in the tie.
- Record against the top team(s) not involved in the tie in order of conference record, going down through the seedings until the tie is broken.
- Average of the teams' ranking in the following computer systems: NCAA NET, Sagarin, KenPom, and ESPN Basketball Percentage Index.

Seed	School	Record	Tiebreaker
1	Princeton	12–2	
2	Columbia	11–3	
3	Harvard	10–4	
4	Brown	8–6	
DNQ	Penn	7–7	
DNQ	Cornell	4–10	
DNQ	Yale	3–11	
DNQ	Dartmouth	1–13	

== Schedule ==
Session	Game	Time	Matchup	Score	Television	Attendance
Semifinals – Friday, March 13
1	1	4:30 p.m.	No. 1 Princeton vs. No. 4 Brown	65–51	ESPN+	788
1	2	7:30 p.m.	No. 2 Columbia vs. No. 3 Harvard	65–67^{OT}	ESPN+	788
Championship – Saturday, March 14
2	3	5:30 p.m.	No. 1 Princeton vs. No. 3 Harvard	63–53	ESPNU	698
Game times in Eastern Time. Rankings denote tournament seeding.

== Bracket ==
Semifinals; Friday, March 13; ESPN+
1	23 Princeton	65
4	Brown	51
2	Columbia	65
3	Harvard	67*

Championship; Saturday, March 14; ESPNU
1	23 Princeton	63
3	Harvard	53

* denotes overtime period

== See also ==
- 2026 Ivy League men's basketball tournament
