= 2025–26 NCAA Division I women's basketball rankings =

- Season: 2025–26
- NCAA Tournament: 2026
- Preseason No. 1: UConn
- NCAA Tournament Champions: UCLA
NCAA Division I women's basketball rankings
← 2024–25

Two human polls make up the 2025–26 NCAA Division I women's basketball rankings, the AP Poll and the Coaches Poll, in addition to various publications' preseason polls.

== Legend ==
	Increase in ranking
	Decrease in ranking
	Not ranked previous week
Italics	Number of first place votes
(#–#)	Win-loss record
т	Tied with team above or below also with this symbol

== AP Poll ==
The women's basketball poll began during the 1976–77 season, and was initially compiled by Mel Greenberg and published by The Philadelphia Inquirer. At first, it was a poll of coaches conducted via telephone, where coaches identified top teams and a list of the Top 20 teams was produced. The contributors continued to be coaches until 1994, when the AP took over administration of the poll from Greenberg, and switched to a panel of writers.

	Preseason Oct 14	Week 2 Nov 10	Week 3 Nov 17	Week 4 Nov 24	Week 5 Dec 1	Week 6 Dec 8	Week 7 Dec 15	Week 8 Dec 22	Week 9 Dec 29^{[a]}	Week 10 Jan 5	Week 11 Jan 12	Week 12 Jan 19	Week 13 Jan 26	Week 14 Feb 2	Week 15 Feb 9	Week 16 Feb 16	Week 17 Feb 23	Week 18 Mar 2	Week 19 Mar 9	Week 20 Mar 16	Final Apr 6	
1.	UConn (27)	UConn (2–0) (30)	UConn (4–0) (28)	UConn (6–0) (30)	UConn (7–0) (22)	UConn (9–0) (23)	UConn (10–0) (24)	UConn (12–0) (25)	UConn (13–0) (25)	UConn (15–0) (28)	UConn (17–0) (32)	UConn (18–0) (30)	UConn (21–0) (31)	UConn (23–0) (31)	UConn (25–0) (31)	UConn (27–0) (31)	UConn (29–0) (31)	UConn (31–0) (31)	UConn (33–0) (28)	UConn (34–0) (28)	UCLA (37–1) (31)	1.
2.	South Carolina (4)	South Carolina (2–0) (2)	South Carolina (4–0) (3)	South Carolina (6–0) (1)	Texas (8–0) (10)	Texas (10–0) (9)	Texas (12–0) (8)	Texas (14–0) (7)	Texas (15–0) (7)	Texas (17–0) (4)	South Carolina (17–1)	South Carolina (19–1)	UCLA (19–1)	UCLA (21–1)	UCLA (23–1)	UCLA (25–1)	UCLA (27–1)	UCLA (28–1)	UCLA (31–1) (3)	UCLA (31–1) (3)	South Carolina (36–4)	2.
3.	UCLA	UCLA (2–0)	UCLA (5–0) (1)	UCLA (6–0) (1)	South Carolina (7–1)	South Carolina (9–1)	South Carolina (10–1)	South Carolina (12–1)	South Carolina (13–1)	South Carolina (15–1)	UCLA (15–1)	UCLA (17–1)	South Carolina (20–2)	South Carolina (21–2)	South Carolina (24–2)	South Carolina (25–2)	South Carolina (27–2)	South Carolina (29–2)	Texas (31–3)	Texas (31–3)	UConn (38–1)	3.
4.	Texas	Texas (2–0)	Texas (4–0)	Texas (5–0)	UCLA (8–1)	UCLA (9–1)	UCLA (9–1)	UCLA (11–1)	UCLA (12–1)	UCLA (14–1)	Texas (18–1)	Texas (19–2)	Texas (19–2)	Texas (21–2)	Texas (24–2)	Texas (24–3)	Texas (26–3)	Texas (28–3)	South Carolina (31–3)	South Carolina (31–3)	Texas (35–4)	4.
5.	LSU	LSU (3–0)	LSU (4–0)	LSU (6–0)	LSU (8–0)	LSU (10–0)	LSU (11–0)	LSU (13–0)	LSU (14–0)	Oklahoma (14–1)	Vanderbilt (17–0)	Vanderbilt (18–0)	Vanderbilt (20–1)	LSU (21–2)	Vanderbilt (22–2)	Vanderbilt (24–3)	Vanderbilt (25–3)	Vanderbilt (27–3)	LSU (27–5)	LSU (27–5)	Duke (27–9)	5.
6.	Oklahoma	Oklahoma (1–0)	Michigan (3–0)	Michigan (5–1)	Michigan (6–1)	Michigan (8–1)	Michigan (9–1)	Michigan (10–1)	Michigan (10–1)	Kentucky (15–1)	LSU (16–2)	LSU (17–2)	LSU (18–2)	Louisville (21–3)	LSU (22–3)	Michigan (22–4)	LSU (24–4)	LSU (26–4)	Vanderbilt (27–4)	Vanderbilt (27–4)	TCU (32–6)	6.
7.	Duke	Baylor (2–0)	Baylor (4–0)	Maryland (7–0)	Maryland (9–0)	Maryland (11–0)	Maryland (12–0)	Maryland (13–0)	Maryland (13–0)	Vanderbilt (15–0)	Kentucky (16–2)	Michigan (15–2)	Louisville (19–3)	Vanderbilt (21–2)	Michigan (20–4)	LSU (22–4)	Oklahoma (21–6)	Oklahoma (23–6)	Iowa (26–6)	Iowa (26–6)	Michigan (28–7)	7.
8.	Tennessee	USC (2–0)	Oklahoma (4–1)	TCU (6–0)	TCU (8–0)	TCU (10–0)	Oklahoma (11–1)	TCU (13–0) т	TCU (13–0) т	Maryland (15–1)	Michigan (14–2)	Louisville (18–3)	Iowa (18–2)	Michigan (19–3)	Ohio State (22–3)	Louisville (24–4)	Michigan (22–5)	Michigan (24–5)	Duke (24–8)	Duke (24–8)	LSU (29–6)	8.
9.	NC State	Maryland (3–0)	Maryland (5–0)	Oklahoma (5–1)	Oklahoma (7–1)	Oklahoma (9–1)	TCU (11–0)	Oklahoma (11–1) т	Oklahoma (11–1) т	Michigan (11–2)	Louisville (16–3)	TCU (18–1)	Michigan (17–3)	Ohio State (20–3)	Louisville (22–4)	Duke (19–6)	Iowa (22–5)	Iowa (24–5)	Michigan (25–6)	Michigan (25–6)	Notre Dame (25–11)	9.
10.	Maryland	NC State (1–1)	TCU (4–0)	Iowa State (7–0)	Iowa State (9–0)	Iowa State (10–0)	Iowa State (12–0)	Iowa State (13–0)	Iowa State (13–0)	Louisville (14–3)	TCU (16–1)	Iowa (16–2)	Oklahoma (16–4)	Iowa (18–4)	Oklahoma (17–5)	Ohio State (22–4)	Louisville (24–5)	TCU (27–4)	Oklahoma (24–7)	Oklahoma (24–7)	Vanderbilt (29–5)	10.
11.	North Carolina	North Carolina (2–0)	USC (2–1)	Iowa (6–0)	North Carolina (8–1)	Iowa (9–0)	Iowa (11–1)	Kentucky (12–1)	Kentucky (13–1)	Iowa State (14–1)	Iowa (14–2)	Kentucky (17–3)	Ohio State (18–3)	Oklahoma (17–5)	Duke (18–6)	Oklahoma (19–6)	TCU (25–4)	Ohio State (24–6)	Ohio State (26–7)	West Virginia (27–6)	Louisville (29–8)	11.
12.	Ole Miss	Tennessee (2–1)	Iowa State (5–0)	North Carolina (5–1)	Iowa (8–0)	North Carolina (9–2)	Kentucky (11–1)	Vanderbilt (12–0)	Vanderbilt (13–0)	LSU (14–2)	Maryland (16–2)	Ohio State (16–2)	TCU (19–2)	Michigan State (19–3)	Baylor (21–4)	TCU (23–4)	Duke (20–7)	Louisville (25–6)	West Virginia (27–6)	Ohio State (26–7)	Oklahoma (26–8)	12.
13.	Michigan	Ole Miss (2–0)	Ole Miss (3–0)	Ole Miss (4–0)	Ole Miss (7–0)	Baylor (9–1)	Vanderbilt (9–0)	Louisville (12–3)	Louisville (12–3)	TCU (14–1)	Oklahoma (14–3)	Michigan State (17–2)	Michigan State (18–2)	Ole Miss (18–4)	Michigan State (20–4)	Iowa (19–5)	Ohio State (23–5)	Duke (21–8)	Louisville (27–7)	Louisville (27–7)	North Carolina (28–8)	13.
14.	Iowa State	Michigan (2–0)	North Carolina (3–1)	Tennessee (5–1)	Baylor (7–1)	Vanderbilt (9–0)	Ole Miss (10–1)	Iowa (10–2)	Iowa (11–2)	Iowa (12–2)	Ohio State (15–2)	Baylor (17–3)	Baylor (18–3)	TCU (20–3)	Ole Miss (19–5)	Maryland (21–6)	Maryland (22–6)	Maryland (23–7)	TCU (29–5)	TCU (29–5)	Kentucky (25–11)	14.
15.	Notre Dame	Duke (1–1)	Tennessee (3–1)	Baylor (5–1)	Vanderbilt (8–0)	Kentucky (10–1)	Baylor (10–2)	Ole Miss (12–1)	Ole Miss (13–2)	Michigan State (14–1)	Michigan State (16–1)	Maryland (17–3)	Tennessee (14–3)	Baylor (19–4)	Iowa (18–5)	Baylor (22–5)	Michigan State (22–6)	West Virginia (24–6)	North Carolina (26–7)	North Carolina (26–7)	Minnesota (24–9)	15.
16.	Baylor	Iowa State (3–0)	NC State (2–2)	Kentucky (7–0)	USC (5–2)	USC (7–2)	Louisville (10–3)	North Carolina (11–3)	North Carolina (11–3)	Baylor (13–3)	Ole Miss (16–3)	Oklahoma (14–4)	Maryland (17–4)	Kentucky (18–5)	Texas Tech (22–3)	Kentucky (20–7)	Kentucky (20–8)	North Carolina (25–6)	Kentucky (23–10)	Kentucky (23–10)	Iowa (27–7)	16.
17.	TCU	TCU (2–0)	Vanderbilt (3–0)	Vanderbilt (6–0)	Kentucky (8–1)	Ole Miss (8–1)	Tennessee (7–2)	USC (9–3)	USC (9–3)	Texas Tech (16–0)	Texas Tech (18–0)	Tennessee (13–3)	Ole Miss (17–4)	Duke (16–6)	TCU (21–4)	Ole Miss (20–6)	West Virginia (22–6)	Kentucky (21–9)	Maryland (23–8)	Maryland (23–8)	Ohio State (27–8)	17.
18.	USC	Notre Dame (2–0)	Oklahoma State (5–0)	USC (3–2)	Notre Dame (5–1)	Tennessee (6–2)	North Carolina (9–3)	Notre Dame (9–2)	Notre Dame (9–2)	Ole Miss (14–3)	Baylor (15–3)	Ole Miss (16–4)	Kentucky (17–5)	Texas Tech (21–3)	Kentucky (18–6)	Michigan State (20–6)	Baylor (23–6)	Michigan State (22–7)	Minnesota (22–8)	Minnesota (22–8)	West Virginia (28–7)	18.
19.	Vanderbilt	Vanderbilt (1–0)	Iowa (4–0)	Notre Dame (4–1)	Tennessee (5–2)	Notre Dame (6–2)	USC (7–3)	Ohio State (10–1)	Ohio State (11–2)	Ohio State (13–2)	Iowa State (14–3)	Texas Tech (19–1)	Princeton (17–1)	Tennessee (14–5)	West Virginia (20–5)	West Virginia (21–6)	Ole Miss (21–8)	Minnesota (22–7)	Ole Miss (23–11)	Ole Miss (23–11)	Virginia (22–12)	19.
20.	Louisville	Oklahoma State (4–0)	Kentucky (5–0)	Michigan State (6–0)	Michigan State (8–0)	Washington (8–1)	Notre Dame (8–2)	Nebraska (12–0)	Nebraska (12–0)	Tennessee (10–3)	Tennessee (12–3)	Princeton (15–1)	Duke (14–6)	West Virginia (18–5)	Maryland (19–6)	Texas Tech (23–4)	Texas Tech (24–5)	Baylor (24–7)	Michigan State (22–8)	Michigan State (22–8)	Maryland (24–9)	20.
21.	Iowa	Iowa (2–0)	Louisville (3–1)	West Virginia (5–0)	Washington (7–0)	Ohio State (7–1)	Ohio State (9–1)	Texas Tech (14–0)	Texas Tech (14–0)	USC (10–4)	Alabama (16–1)	Duke (13–6)	Texas Tech (20–2)	Alabama (19–4)	North Carolina (20–5)	Tennessee (16–7)	North Carolina (23–6)	Texas Tech (25–6)	Baylor (24–8)	Baylor (24–8)	Ole Miss (24–12)	21.
22.	Oklahoma State	Louisville (1–1)	Michigan State (4–0)	Washington (5–0)	Louisville (7–2)	Louisville (8–3)	Washington (9–1)	Baylor (11–3)	Baylor (11–3)	North Carolina (13–4)	Princeton (14–1)	West Virginia (15–4)	West Virginia (17–4)	Maryland (17–6)	Tennessee (15–6)	North Carolina (21–6)	Minnesota (21–7)	Georgia (22–8)	Notre Dame (22–10)	Notre Dame (22–10)	Michigan State (23–9)	22.
23.	Michigan State	Kentucky (3–0)	West Virginia (4–0)	Louisville (4–2)	Ohio State (6–1)	Oklahoma State (10–1)	Nebraska (11–0)	Tennessee (7–3)	Tennessee (8–3)	Washington (12–2)	Notre Dame (12–4)	Alabama (17–3)	Georgia (18–3)	Princeton (18–2)	Alabama (20–5)	Minnesota (20–6)	Georgia (20–7)	Princeton (22–3)	Princeton (24–3)	Princeton (24–3)	Baylor (25–9)	23.
24.	Kentucky т	Michigan State (2–0)	Notre Dame (3–1)	Oklahoma State (5–1)	Oklahoma State (8–1)	Nebraska (9–0)	Michigan State (9–1)	Michigan State (10–1)	Michigan State (12–1)	Princeton (13–1)	Nebraska (14–3)	Nebraska (14–4)	Alabama (18–3)	Washington (17–5)	Princeton (19–2)	Georgia (20–6)	Alabama (21–7)	Ole Miss (21–10)	Georgia (22–9)	Georgia (22–9)	Alabama (24–11)	24.
25.	Richmond т	Washington (1–0)	Washington (3–0)	NC State (3–3)	West Virginia (6–1)	Michigan State (8–1)	Princeton (10–1)	Princeton (11–1)	Princeton (12–1)	Nebraska (13–2)	Illinois (14–3)	Washington (14–4)	Washington (15–4)	North Carolina (17–5)	Washington (18–6)	Alabama (20–6)	Princeton (21–3)	Fairfield (25–4)	Texas Tech (25–7)	Texas Tech (25–7)	Washington (22–11)	25.
	Preseason Oct 14	Week 2 Nov 10	Week 3 Nov 17	Week 4 Nov 24	Week 5 Dec 1	Week 6 Dec 8	Week 7 Dec 15	Week 8 Dec 22	Week 9 Dec 29^{[a]}	Week 10 Jan 5	Week 11 Jan 12	Week 12 Jan 19	Week 13 Jan 26	Week 14 Feb 2	Week 15 Feb 9	Week 16 Feb 16	Week 17 Feb 23	Week 18 Mar 2	Week 19 Mar 9	Week 20 Mar 16	Final Apr 6	
		Dropped: No. 25т Richmond (1–1)	Dropped: No. 15 Duke (3–2)	None	Dropped: No. 25 NC State (5–3)	Dropped: No. 25 West Virginia (7–2)	Dropped: No. 23 Oklahoma State (10–2)	Dropped: No. 22 Washington (10–2)	None	Dropped: No. 18 Notre Dame (10–4)	Dropped: No. 21 USC (10–6); No. 22 North Carolina (13–5); No. 23 Washington (12–4)	Dropped: No. 19 Iowa State (14–5); No. 23 Notre Dame (12–5); No. 25 Illinois (15–4)	Dropped: No. 24 Nebraska (15–5)	Dropped: No. 23 Georgia (18–4)	None	Dropped: No. 24 Princeton (20–3); No. 25 Washington (19–7)	Dropped: No. 21 Tennessee (16–10)	Dropped: No. 24 Alabama (21–9)	Dropped: No. 25 Fairfield (27–4)	None	Dropped: No. 23 Princeton (26–4); No. 24 Georgia (22–10); No. 25 Texas Tech (26–8)	

^{a} The AP Poll skipped Week 9, so Week 8 rankings were carried over.

== USA Today Coaches Poll ==
The Coaches Poll is the second oldest poll still in use after the AP Poll. It is compiled by a rotating group of 31 college Division I head coaches. The Poll operates by Borda count. Each voting member ranks teams from 1 to 25. Each team then receives points for their ranking in reverse order: Number 1 earns 25 points, number 2 earns 24 points, and so forth. The points are then combined and the team with the highest points is then ranked No. 1; second highest is ranked No. 2 and so forth. Only the top 25 teams with points are ranked, with teams receiving first place votes noted the quantity next to their name. The maximum points a single team can earn is 775.

	Preseason Oct 23	Week 2 Nov 11	Week 3 Nov 18	Week 4 Nov 25	Week 5 Dec 2	Week 6 Dec 9	Week 7 Dec 16	Week 8 Dec 23	Week 9 Dec 30	Week 10 Jan 6	Week 11 Jan 13	Week 12 Jan 20	Week 13 Jan 27	Week 14 Feb 3	Week 15 Feb 10	Week 16 Feb 17	Week 17 Feb 24	Week 18 Mar 3	Week 19 Mar 10	Week 20 Mar 16	Final Apr 6	
1.	UConn (28)	UConn (2–0) (29)	UConn (4–0) (28)	UConn (6–0) (29)	UConn (7–0) (28)	UConn (9–0) (28)	UConn (10–0) (28)	UConn (12–0) (28)	UConn (13–0) (28)	UConn (15–0) (28)	UConn (17–0) (31)	UConn (19–0) (31)	UConn (21–0) (31)	UConn (23–0) (31)	UConn (25–0) (31)	UConn (27–0) (31)	UConn (29–0) (31)	UConn (31–0) (31)	UConn (34–0) (30)	UConn (34–0) (30)	UCLA (37–1) (31)	1.
2.	South Carolina (3)	South Carolina (2–0) (2)	South Carolina (4–0) (3)	South Carolina (6–0) (2)	Texas (8–0) (3)	Texas (10–0) (3)	Texas (12–0) (3)	Texas (14–0) (3)	Texas (15–0) (3)	Texas (17–0) (3)	South Carolina (17–1)	South Carolina (19–1)	UCLA (19–1)	UCLA (21–1)	UCLA (23–1)	UCLA (25–1)	UCLA (27–1)	UCLA (28–1)	UCLA (31–1) (1)	UCLA (31–1) (1)	South Carolina (36–4)	2.
3.	Texas	Texas (3–0)	UCLA (5–0)	UCLA (6–0)	South Carolina (7–1)	South Carolina (9–1)	South Carolina (10–1)	South Carolina (12–1)	South Carolina (13–1)	South Carolina (15–1)	UCLA (15–1)	UCLA (17–1)	South Carolina (20–2)	South Carolina (22–2)	South Carolina (24–2)	South Carolina (25–2)	South Carolina (27–2)	South Carolina (29–2)	Texas (31–3)	Texas (31–3)	UConn (38–1)	3.
4.	UCLA	UCLA (3–0)	Texas (4–0)	Texas (5–0)	UCLA (8–1)	UCLA (9–1)	UCLA (9–1)	UCLA (11–1)	UCLA (12–1)	UCLA (14–1)	Texas (18–1)	Vanderbilt (19–0)	Texas (19–2)	Texas (21–2)	Texas (23–2)	Texas (24–3)	Texas (26–3)	Texas (28–3)	South Carolina (31–3)	South Carolina (31–3)	Texas (35–4)	4.
5.	LSU	LSU (3–0)	LSU (5–0)	LSU (6–0)	LSU (8–0)	LSU (10–0)	LSU (11–0)	LSU (13–0)	LSU (14–0)	Oklahoma (14–1)	Vanderbilt (17–0)	Texas (19–2)	LSU (19–2)	LSU (21–2)	Vanderbilt (23–2)	Michigan (22–4)	Vanderbilt (25–3)	Vanderbilt (27–3)	LSU (27–5)	LSU (27–5)	Duke (27–9)	5.
6.	Duke	Oklahoma (1–1)	Maryland (5–0)	Maryland (7–0)	Maryland (9–0)	Maryland (11–0)	Maryland (12–0)	Maryland (13–0)	Maryland (14–0)	Vanderbilt (15–0)	LSU (16–2)	LSU (17–2)	Vanderbilt (20–1)	Louisville (21–3)	LSU (22–3)	Vanderbilt (24–3)	LSU (24–4)	LSU (26–4)	Vanderbilt (27–4)	Vanderbilt (27–4)	Michigan (28–7)	6.
7.	Oklahoma	Maryland (3–0)	Oklahoma (4–1)	TCU (6–0)	TCU (8–0)	TCU (10–0)	TCU (11–0)	TCU (13–0)	TCU (13–0)	Kentucky (15–1)	Michigan (14–2)	Michigan (15–3)т	Louisville (19–3)	Michigan (19–3)	Michigan (20–4)	LSU (22–4)	Oklahoma (21–6)	Michigan (24–5)	Iowa (26–6)	Iowa (26–6)	LSU (29–6)	7.
8.	NC State	North Carolina (2–0)	TCU (4–0)	Oklahoma (5–1)	Michigan (6–1)	Michigan (8–1)	Oklahoma (11–1)	Oklahoma (12–1)т	Michigan (11–1)	Maryland (15–1)	TCU (16–1)	Louisville (18–3)т	Iowa (18–2)	Vanderbilt (21–2)	Ohio State (22–3)	Louisville (22–4)	Michigan (22–5)	Oklahoma (23–6)	Michigan (25–6)	Michigan (25–6)	Vanderbilt (29–5)	8.
9.	Tennessee	NC State (1–1)	Michigan (3–0)	Michigan (5–1)	Oklahoma (7–1)	Oklahoma (9–1)	Michigan (9–1)	Michigan (10–1)т	Oklahoma (12–1)	Michigan (12–2)	Kentucky (16–2)	TCU (18–2)	Michigan (17–3)	Ohio State (20–3)	Louisville (22–4)	Oklahoma (19–6)	Iowa (22–5)	Iowa (24–5)	Oklahoma (24–7)	Oklahoma (24–7)	TCU (32–6)	9.
10.	Maryland	USC (2–0)	Baylor (4–0)	North Carolina (5–1)	North Carolina (8–1)	Iowa State (10–0)	Iowa State (12–0)	Iowa State (13–0)	Iowa State (13–0)	TCU (14–1)	Louisville (16–3)	Iowa (16–2)	TCU (19–2)	Iowa (18–4)	Oklahoma (17–6)	Ohio State (22–4)	TCU (25–4)	TCU (27–4)	Duke (24–8)	Duke (24–8)	Oklahoma (26–8)	10.
11.	North Carolina	Duke (1–1)	USC (2–1)	Tennessee (5–1)	Iowa State (9–0)	North Carolina (9–2)	Vanderbilt (10–0)	Vanderbilt (12–0)	Vanderbilt (13–0)	Louisville (14–3)	Maryland (16–2)	Ohio State (17–2)	Oklahoma (16–4)	Oklahoma (17–5)	Baylor (21–4)	TCU (23–4)	Louisville (24–5)	Ohio State (24–6)	Ohio State (26–7)	Ohio State (26–7)	Louisville (29–8)	11.
12.	TCU	Tennessee (2–1)т	North Carolina (3–1)	Iowa State (7–0)	Iowa (8–0)	Iowa (9–0)	Iowa (10–1)	Kentucky (12–1)	Kentucky (13–1)	LSU (14–2)	Oklahoma (14–3)	Kentucky (17–3)	Ohio State (18–3)	TCU (20–3)	Iowa (18–5)	Iowa (20–5)	Ohio State (23–5)	Louisville (25–6)	TCU (29–5)	TCU (29–5)	Iowa (27–7)	12.
13.	Notre Dame	TCU (2–0)т	Tennessee (3–1)	Ole Miss (5–0)	Ole Miss (7–0)	Vanderbilt (9–0)	Kentucky (11–1)	Louisville (12–3)	Louisville (12–3)	Iowa State (14–1)	Iowa (14–2)	Maryland (17–3)	Michigan State (18–2)	Michigan State (19–3)	Michigan State (20–4)	Duke (19–6)	Maryland (22–6)	Maryland (23–7)	West Virginia (27–6)	West Virginia (27–6)	North Carolina (28–8)	13.
14.	Ole Miss	Baylor (2–0)	Ole Miss (3–0)	Iowa (6–0)	Vanderbilt (8–0)	Baylor (9–1)	Ole Miss (10–1)	Iowa (10–2)	Iowa (11–2)	Iowa (13–2)	Michigan State (16–1)	Baylor (17–3)	Baylor (18–3)	Ole Miss (19–4)	TCU (21–4)	Baylor (22–5)	Duke (20–7)	Duke (21–8)	Louisville (27–7)	Louisville (27–7)	Notre Dame (25–11)	14.
15.	Michigan	Michigan (2–0)	Iowa State (5–0)	Kentucky (7–0)	Baylor (7–1)	Kentucky (10–1)	Baylor (10–2)	North Carolina (11–3)	North Carolina (12–3)	Michigan State (14–1)	Ohio State (15–2)	Michigan State (17–2)	Tennessee (14–3)	Baylor (19–4)	Duke (18–6)	Maryland (21–6)	Michigan State (22–6)	West Virginia (24–6)	North Carolina (26–7)	North Carolina (26–7)	Ohio State (27–8)	15.
16.	USC	Ole Miss (2–0)	NC State (2–2)	Baylor (5–1)	Kentucky (8–1)	Ole Miss (8–1)	North Carolina (9–3)	USC (9–3)	USC (10–3)	Baylor (13–3)	Ole Miss (16–3)	Oklahoma (14–4)	Maryland (17–4)	Kentucky (18–5)	Ole Miss (19–5)	Michigan State (20–6)	Baylor (24–6)	North Carolina (25–6)	Maryland (23–8)	Maryland (23–8)	West Virginia (28–7)	16.
17.	Iowa State	Notre Dame (2–0)	Vanderbilt (3–0)	Vanderbilt (6–0)	Tennessee (5–2)	USC (7–2)	Louisville (10–3)	Ole Miss (12–2)	Ole Miss (13–2)	Ole Miss (14–3)	Baylor (15–3)	Tennessee (13–3)	Ole Miss (17–4)	Tennessee (14–5)	Maryland (19–6)	Ole Miss (20–6)	West Virginia (22–6)	Michigan State (22–7)	Kentucky (23–10)	Kentucky (23–10)	Kentucky (25–11)	17.
18.	Baylor	Iowa State (3–0)	Kentucky (5–0)	USC (3–2)	USC (5–2)	Tennessee (6–2)	Tennessee (7–2)	Notre Dame (9–2)	Notre Dame (10–2)	North Carolina (13–4)	Texas Tech (18–0)	Ole Miss (16–4)	Kentucky (17–5)	Texas Tech (21–3)	Texas Tech (22–3)	Kentucky (20–7)	Kentucky (20–8)	Baylor (24–7)	Michigan State (22–8)	Michigan State (22–8)	Minnesota (24–9)	18.
19.	Louisville	Vanderbilt (2–0)	Louisville (3–1)	Notre Dame (5–1)	Notre Dame (5–1)	Notre Dame (6–2)	USC (7–3)	Ohio State (11–1)	Michigan State (12–1)	Ohio State (13–2)	Iowa State (14–3)	Texas Tech (19–1)	Princeton (17–1)	Maryland (17–6)	Kentucky (18–7)	West Virginia (21–6)	North Carolina (23–6)	Kentucky (21–9)	Minnesota (22–8)	Minnesota (22–8)	Maryland (24–9)	19.
20.	Kentucky	Kentucky (3–0)	Iowa (4–0)	West Virginia (6–0)	Michigan State (8–0)	Louisville (8–3)	Notre Dame (8–2)	Baylor (11–3)	Ohio State (11–2)	Texas Tech (16–0)	Tennessee (12–3)	Princeton (16–1)	Texas Tech (20–2)	West Virginia (18–5)	West Virginia (20–5)	Texas Tech (23–4)	Ole Miss (21–8)	Minnesota (22–7)	Ole Miss (23–11)	Ole Miss (23–11)	Michigan State (23–9)	20.
21.	Vanderbilt	Louisville (1–1)	Oklahoma State (5–0)	Michigan State (6–0)	Louisville (7–2)	Ohio State (7–1)	Ohio State (9–1)	Tennessee (8–3)т	Baylor (11–3)	USC (10–4)	Alabama (17–1)	North Carolina (15–5)	West Virginia (17–4)	North Carolina (18–5)	North Carolina (20–5)	Tennessee (16–7)	Texas Tech (24–5)	Texas Tech (25–6)	Baylor (24–8)	Baylor (24–8)	Baylor (25–9)	21.
22.	Oklahoma State	Oklahoma State (4–0)	West Virginia (4–0)	Louisville (4–2)	Washington (8–0)	Oklahoma State (10–1)	Washington (9–1)	Michigan State (11–1)т	Tennessee (8–3)	Tennessee (10–3)	Notre Dame (12–4)	West Virginia (15–4)	Alabama (18–3)	Duke (16–6)	Tennessee (15–6)	North Carolina (21–6)	Minnesota (21–7)	Georgia (22–8)	Texas Tech (25–7)	Texas Tech (25–7)	Ole Miss (24–12)	22.
23.	Iowa	Iowa (2–0)	Notre Dame (3–1)	Washington (5–0)	Oklahoma State (8–1)	Washington (8–1)	Michigan State (9–1)	Texas Tech (14–0)	Texas Tech (14–0)	Washington (12–2)	North Carolina (13–5)	Alabama (17–3)	North Carolina (17–5)	Alabama (19–4)	Alabama (20–5)	Minnesota (20–6)	Alabama (21–7)	Ole Miss (21–10)	Princeton (24–3)	Princeton (26–3)	Texas Tech (26–8)	23.
24.	Ohio State	Michigan State (2–0)	Duke (3–2)	NC State (3–3)	Ohio State (6–1)	Michigan State (8–1)	Alabama (11–0)	Nebraska (12–0)	Alabama (14–0)	Alabama (15–1)	Princeton (14–1)	Iowa State (14–5)	Washington (16–4)	Princeton (18–2)	Princeton (19–2)	Alabama (20–6)	Georgia (21–7)	Princeton (23–3)	Georgia (22–9)	Georgia (22–9)	Virginia (22–12)	24.
25.	Kansas State	Ohio State (1–0)	Michigan State (4–0)	Oklahoma State (6–1)	NC State (5–3)	Alabama (10–0)	Nebraska (11–0)	Alabama (14–0)	Nebraska (12–1)	Notre Dame (10–4)	West Virginia (14–3)	Washington (14–4)	Georgia (18–3)	Washington (17–5)	Iowa State (19–5)	Georgia (20–6)	Iowa State (21–7)	Alabama (21–9)	Notre Dame (22–10)	Notre Dame (22–10)	Princeton (26–4)	25.
	Preseason Oct 23	Week 2 Nov 11	Week 3 Nov 18	Week 4 Nov 25	Week 5 Dec 2	Week 6 Dec 9	Week 7 Dec 16	Week 8 Dec 23	Week 9 Dec 30	Week 10 Jan 6	Week 11 Jan 13	Week 12 Jan 20	Week 13 Jan 27	Week 14 Feb 3	Week 15 Feb 10	Week 16 Feb 17	Week 17 Feb 24	Week 18 Mar 3	Week 19 Mar 10	Week 20 Mar 16	Final Apr 6	
		Dropped: No. 25 Kansas State (3–0)	Dropped: No. 25 Ohio State (2–1)	Dropped: No. 24 Duke (3–3)	Dropped: No. 20 West Virginia (6–2)	Dropped: No. 25 NC State (6–4)	Dropped: No. 22 Oklahoma State (11–2)	Dropped: No. 22 Washington (10–2)	None	Dropped: No. 25 Nebraska (13–2)	Dropped: No. 21 USC (10–6); No. 23 Washington (12–4)	Dropped: No. 22 Notre Dame (12–6)	Dropped: No. 24 Iowa State (16–5)	Dropped: No. 25 Georgia (18–4)	Dropped: No. 25 Washington (18–6)	Dropped: No. 24 Princeton (20–3); No. 25 Iowa State (20–6)	Dropped: No. 21 Tennessee (16–10)	Dropped: No. 25 Iowa State (22–8)	Dropped: No. 25 Alabama (23–10)	None	Dropped: No. 24 Georgia (22–10)	

== See also ==
- 2025–26 NCAA Division I men's basketball rankings
