= 2025–26 Hofstra Pride women's basketball team =

American college basketball season

2025–26 Hofstra Pride women's basketball
- Conference: Coastal Athletic Association
- Record: 11–22 (6–12 CAA)
- Head coach: Danielle Santos Atkinson (7th season)
- Associate head coach: Lance White
- Assistant coaches: Keila Whittington; Amber Reeves; Maniya Custis
- Home arena: Mack Sports Complex

2025–26 CAA women's basketball standings
	Conf.				Overall
Team	W		L	PCT	W		L	PCT
Charleston †	16	–	2	.889	27	–	6	.818
Campbell	13	–	5	.722	20	–	12	.625
Drexel	13	–	5	.722	21	–	11	.656
Stony Brook	12	–	6	.667	18	–	15	.545
Monmouth	12	–	6	.667	21	–	12	.636
Elon	10	–	8	.556	16	–	16	.500
Towson	10	–	8	.556	17	–	14	.548
William & Mary	9	–	9	.500	17	–	14	.548
North Carolina A&T	7	–	11	.389	12	–	18	.400
Hofstra	6	–	12	.333	11	–	22	.333
Hampton	4	–	14	.222	10	–	21	.323
Northeastern	3	–	15	.167	7	–	22	.241
UNC Wilmington	2	–	16	.111	7	–	24	.226
† 2026 CAA tournament winner

The 2025–26 Hofstra Pride women's basketball team represented Hofstra University during the 2025–26 NCAA Division I women's basketball season. The Pride, led by seventh-year head coach Danielle Santos Atkinson, played their home games at the Mack Sports Complex in Hempstead, New York, as members of the Coastal Athletic Association.

== Previous season ==
The Pride finished the 2024–25 season 14–16, 9–9 in CAA play, to finish in a three-way tie for sixth place. They were defeated by #9 seed and eventual tournament champions William & Mary in the second round of the CAA tournament.

== Preseason ==
On October 2, 2025, the Coastal Athletic Association released their preseason poll. Hofstra was picked to finish ninth in the conference.

=== Preseason rankings ===
CAA Preseason Poll
Place	Team	Votes
1	Charleston	139 (8)
2	Drexel	125 (2)
3	North Carolina A&T	124 (3)
4	Campbell	112
5	Elon	87
6	William & Mary	83
7	Towson	79
8	Monmouth	71
9	Hofstra	67
10	UNC Wilmington	39
11	Hampton	37
12	Stony Brook	33
13	Northeastern	18
(#) first-place votes

=== Preseason All-CAA Teams ===
Preseason All-CAA Teams
Team	Name	Class	Position
Second	Chloe Sterling	Senior	Guard
Honorable Mention - Emma Von Essen

== Roster ==
2025–26 Hofstra Pride women's basketball team
Players
Coaches

Pos.	#	Name	Height	Year	Previous school	Hometown
PG	0	Sana'a Garrett	5 ft 7 in (1.7 m)	Jr	Jacksonville	Philadelphia, Pennsylvania
G	1	Maddie Pounds	5 ft 8 in (1.73 m)	So	N.C. Good Better Best Academy	Rocky Mount, North Carolina
G	2	Emma Von Essen	5 ft 9 in (1.75 m)	Sr	Long Island Lutheran High School	Rockville Centre, New York
G	3	Chloe Sterling	5 ft 7 in (1.7 m)	Sr	James Madison	Kennesaw, Georgia
G/F	5	Ema Karim	5 ft 10 in (1.78 m)	So	Amelia Rey Colaço Escola	Paredes, Portugal
F	6	Ayen Angoi	5 ft 11 in (1.8 m)	Sr	Louisiana Tech	Lavon, Texas
C	7	Deivejon Harris	6 ft 3 in (1.91 m)	Sr	Texas Southern	Bronx, New York
G	8	Nevaeh Brown	5 ft 8 in (1.73 m)	GS	UCF	Charlotte, North Carolina
PG	10	Alarice Gooden	5 ft 7 in (1.7 m)	Sr	J. Addison School	Brampton, Ontario
G	11	Syniya Barton	5 ft 7 in (1.7 m)	Fr	Monsignor McClancy Memorial High School	South Hempstead, New York
F	13	Sandra Magolico	6 ft 1 in (1.85 m)	GS	SMU	Maputo, Mozambique
F	23	Olivia VanPatten	6 ft 1 in (1.85 m)	Fr	St. George's School	Cranston, Rhode Island
G	25	Micaela Carter	5 ft 6 in (1.68 m)	Jr	St. Mary Catholic Secondary School	Brampton, Ontario
F/C	32	Michaela Hodge	6 ft 3 in (1.91 m)	So	Northampton County High School	Jackson, North Carolina
F	35	Kiyanna Blacks-Stewart	6 ft 1 in (1.85 m)	Fr	Paul VI High School	Sicklerville, New Jersey

Head coach

- Danielle Santos Atkinson (Florida)

Assistant coach(es)

- Lance White (Texas Tech)
- Keila Whittington (Dillard)
- Amber Reeves (UNC Wilmington)
- Maniya Custis (Hofstra)

Legend

- (C) Team captain
- (S) Suspended
- (I) Ineligible
- (W) Walk-on
- Injured
- Current redshirt

Roster
Last update: May 26, 2026

== Schedule and results ==
Date time, TV	Rank^{#}	Opponent^{#}	Result	Record	Site (attendance) city, state
Non-conference regular season
November 3, 2025*; 5:00 pm, ACCNX		at Miami (FL)	L 48–83	0–1	Watsco Center (803); Coral Gables, FL
November 11, 2025*; 6:00 pm, ESPN+		at Yale	W 73–66	1–1	John J. Lee Amphitheater (240); New Haven, CT
November 15, 2025*; 1:00 pm, FloCollege/MSG		Penn	L 55–67	1–2	Mack Sports Complex (462); Hempstead, NY
November 22, 2025*; 2:00 pm, FloCollege		Bucknell	L 55–61	1–3	Mack Sports Complex (430); Hempstead, NY
November 27, 2025*; 3:00 pm, FloCollege		vs. No. 7 Maryland; Puerto Rico Shootout	L 38−95	1−4	Coliseo Guillermo Angulo (250); Carolina, PR
November 28, 2025*; 12:30 pm, FloCollege		vs. East Carolina; Puerto Rico Shootout	L 53−72	1−5	Coliseo Guillermo Angulo (250); Carolina, PR
December 6, 2025*; 2:00 pm, FloCollege/MSG2		Fordham	L 46–69	1–6	Mack Sports Complex (327); Hempstead, NY
December 9, 2025*; 6:00 pm, FloCollege		Marywood	W 80–44	2–6	Mack Sports Complex (188); Hempstead, NY
December 13, 2025*; 2:00 pm, ESPN+		at St. John's	L 60–63	2–7	Carnesecca Arena (881); Queens, NY
December 21, 2025*; 12:00 pm, ESPN+		at Albany	L 43–52	2–8	Broadview Center (2,568); Albany, NY
December 28, 2025*; 2:00 pm, SECN+		at No. 11 Kentucky	L 42–80	2–9	Memorial Coliseum (4,609); Lexington, KY
CAA regular season
January 2, 2026; 7:00 pm, FloCollege		at Charleston	L 55−72	2−10 (0–1)	TD Arena (433); Charleston, SC
January 4, 2026; 1:00 pm, FloCollege		at UNC Wilmington	W 54–46	3–10 (1–1)	Trask Coliseum (841); Wilmington, NC
January 9, 2026; 6:00 pm, FloCollege/MSGSN		Towson	L 46–47	3–11 (1–2)	Mack Sports Complex (429); Hempstead, NY
January 11, 2026; 2:00 pm, FloCollege		at Drexel	L 38–67	3–12 (1–3)	Daskalakis Athletic Center (519); Philadelphia, PA
January 16, 2026; 6:00 pm, FloCollege/MSGSN		Stony Brook; Battle of Long Island	L 44–61	3–13 (1–4)	Mack Sports Complex (466); Hempstead, NY
January 18, 2026; 2:00 pm, FloCollege/MSGSN		Northeastern	L 60–62	3–14 (1–5)	Mack Sports Complex (605); Hempstead, NY
January 23, 2026; 11:00 am, FloCollege		at Towson	L 55–58	3–15 (1–6)	SECU Arena (713); Towson, MD
January 26, 2026; 3:00 pm, FloCollege/MSGSN		William & Mary	L 37–55	3–16 (1–7)	Mack Sports Complex; Hempstead, NY
January 30, 2026; 6:31 pm, FloCollege		at Stony Brook; Battle of Long Island	L 49–52	3–17 (1–8)	Stony Brook Arena (688); Stony Brook, NY
February 6, 2026; 6:00 pm, FloCollege/MSGSN		Monmouth	L 54–59	3–18 (1–9)	Mack Sports Complex (487); Hempstead, NY
February 8, 2026; 2:00 pm, FloCollege		Hampton	W 75–59	4–18 (2–9)	Mack Sports Complex (387); Hempstead, NY
February 13, 2026; 7:00 pm, FloCollege		at Campbell	L 47–58	4–19 (2–10)	Gore Arena (1,072); Buies Creek, NC
February 15, 2026; 1:00 pm, FloCollege		at North Carolina A&T	W 60–51	5–19 (3–10)	Corbett Sports Center (625); Greensboro, NC
February 22, 2026; 12:00 pm, FloCollege/MSG		UNC Wilmington	W 75–43	6–19 (4–10)	Mack Sports Complex (493); Hempstead, NY
February 27, 2026; 6:00 pm, FloCollege/MSGSN		Elon	L 56–58	6–20 (4–11)	Mack Sports Complex (327); Hempstead, NY
March 1, 2026; 3:00 pm, FloCollege		at Monmouth	W 45–44	7–20 (5–11)	OceanFirst Bank Center (811); West Long Branch, NJ
March 5, 2026; 6:00 pm, FloCollege/MSG2		Drexel	L 56–70	7–21 (5–12)	Mack Sports Complex (399); Hempstead, NY
March 7, 2026; 1:00 pm, FloCollege		at Northeastern	W 62–46	8–21 (6–12)	Cabot Center (204); Boston, MA
CAA tournament
March 12, 2026; 6:00 pm, FloCollege	(10)	vs. (7) Towson; Second Round	W 72–71	9–21	CareFirst Arena; Washington, D.C.
March 13, 2026; 6:00 pm, FloCollege	(10)	vs. (2) Campbell; Quarterfinals	W 55–50	10–21	CareFirst Arena; Washington, D.C.
March 14, 2026; 4:30 pm, FloCollege	(10)	vs. (3) Drexel; Semifinals	W 53–49 ^{OT}	11–21	CareFirst Arena (1,450); Washington, D.C.
March 15, 2026; 2:00 pm, CBSSN	(10)	vs. (1) Charleston; Championship	L 56–68	11–22	CareFirst Arena (1,325); Washington, D.C.
*Non-conference game. ^{#}Rankings from AP Poll. (#) Tournament seedings in parentheses. All times are in Eastern.
