= 2025–26 Elon Phoenix women's basketball team =

American college basketball season

2025–26 Elon Phoenix women's basketball
- Conference: Coastal Athletic Association
- Record: 16–16 (10–8 CAA)
- Head coach: Charlotte Smith (15th season)
- Assistant coaches: Edgar Farmer Jr.; Essence Baucom; Kelvin Long Jr.
- Home arena: Schar Center

2025–26 CAA women's basketball standings
	Conf.				Overall
Team	W		L	PCT	W		L	PCT
Charleston †	16	–	2	.889	27	–	6	.818
Campbell	13	–	5	.722	20	–	12	.625
Drexel	13	–	5	.722	21	–	11	.656
Stony Brook	12	–	6	.667	18	–	15	.545
Monmouth	12	–	6	.667	21	–	12	.636
Elon	10	–	8	.556	16	–	16	.500
Towson	10	–	8	.556	17	–	14	.548
William & Mary	9	–	9	.500	17	–	14	.548
North Carolina A&T	7	–	11	.389	12	–	18	.400
Hofstra	6	–	12	.333	11	–	22	.333
Hampton	4	–	14	.222	10	–	21	.323
Northeastern	3	–	15	.167	7	–	22	.241
UNC Wilmington	2	–	16	.111	7	–	24	.226
† 2026 CAA tournament winner

The 2025–26 Elon Phoenix women's basketball team represented Elon University during the 2025–26 NCAA Division I women's basketball season. The Phoenix, led by 15th-year head coach Charlotte Smith, played their home games at the Schar Center in Elon, North Carolina as members of the Coastal Athletic Association.

== Previous season ==
The Phoenix finished the 2024–25 season 15–15, 9–9 in CAA play, to finish in a three-way tie for sixth place. They were upset by #11 seed Towson in the second round of the CAA tournament.

== Preseason ==
On October 2, 2025, the Coastal Athletic Association released their preseason poll. Elon was picked to finish fifth in the conference.

=== Preseason rankings ===
CAA Preseason Poll
Place	Team	Votes
1	Charleston	139 (8)
2	Drexel	125 (2)
3	North Carolina A&T	124 (3)
4	Campbell	112
5	Elon	87
6	William & Mary	83
7	Towson	79
8	Monmouth	71
9	Hofstra	67
10	UNC Wilmington	39
11	Hampton	37
12	Stony Brook	33
13	Northeastern	18
(#) first-place votes

=== Preseason All-CAA Teams ===
Preseason All-CAA Teams
Team	Name	Class	Position
First	Jayda Angel	Sophomore	Guard

== Roster ==
2025–26 Elon Phoenix women's basketball team
Players
Coaches

Pos.	#	Name	Height	Year	Previous school	Hometown
G	1	Ashanti Fox	5 ft 7 in (1.7 m)	Fr	Union Pines High School	Vass, North Carolina
G	4	Maraja Pass	5 ft 4 in (1.63 m)	Jr	Winston Salem Christian School	Shelby, North Carolina
F	5	LaNae' Corbett	6 ft 0 in (1.83 m)	So	Hofstra	Upper Marlboro, Maryland
F	7	Quinzia Fulmore	6 ft 3 in (1.91 m)	GS	Memphis	Greensboro, North Carolina
G	8	Jayda Angel	5 ft 8 in (1.73 m)	So	Cape Fear High School	Fayetteville, North Carolina
G	10	Kamryn Doty	5 ft 5 in (1.65 m)	RS Sr	AZ Compass	Tucson, Arizona
G	11	Ruby Willard	5 ft 10 in (1.78 m)	Sr	San Dieguito Academy	Bozeman, Montana
G	12	Laila Anderson	5 ft 7 in (1.7 m)	Sr	Mount Olive	Burlington, North Carolina
G	15	Kierra Morrow	5 ft 10 in (1.78 m)	So	Cannon School	Charlotte, North Carolina
G	22	Tyana Walker	5 ft 10 in (1.78 m)	RS Jr	Howard	Leawood, Kansas
F/C	24	Tamia Watkins	6 ft 2 in (1.88 m)	Fr	Andrew Jackson High School	Kershaw, South Carolina
G	25	Samira Khalil	5 ft 9 in (1.75 m)	So	Hammond School	Lexington, South Carolina
G	30	Ashlee Shaw	5 ft 7 in (1.7 m)	So	West Cabarrus High School	Concord, North Carolina
C	33	Aly Wadkovsky	6 ft 2 in (1.88 m)	Sr	Lake Norman High School	Denver, North Carolina

Head coach

- Charlotte Smith (North Carolina)

Assistant coach(es)

- Edgar Farmer Jr. (North Carolina)
- Essence Baucom (Elon)
- Kelvin Long Jr. (Tennessee)

Legend

- (C) Team captain
- (S) Suspended
- (I) Ineligible
- (W) Walk-on
- Injured
- Current redshirt

Roster
Last update: May 17, 2026

== Schedule and results ==
Date time, TV	Rank^{#}	Opponent^{#}	Result	Record	High points	High rebounds	High assists	Site (attendance) city, state
Exhibition
October 28, 2025*; 6:00 pm		Winston-Salem State	W 70–59	–	18 – Corbett	5 – Corbett	4 – Pass	Schar Center (237); Elon, NC
Non-conference regular season
November 3, 2025*; 7:00 pm, ESPN+		at East Tennessee State	W 65–56 ^{OT}	1–0	16 – Angel	11 – Walker	3 – Fox	Brooks Gymnasium (585); Johnson City, TN
November 6, 2025*; 7:00 pm, ACCNX		at No. 11 North Carolina	L 37–71	1–1	10 – Corbett	6 – Corbett	2 – Pass	Carmichael Arena (3,111); Chapel Hill, NC
November 10, 2025*; 11:00 am, FloCollege		Presbyterian	W 93–48	2–1	15 – Watkins	7 – Fulmore	5 – Tied	Schar Center (3,224); Elon, NC
November 15, 2025*; 5:00 pm, FloCollege		Howard	L 46–56	2–2	13 – Corbett	9 – Fulmore	3 – Tied	Schar Center (959); Elon, NC
November 24, 2025*; 7:00 pm, ESPN+		at Georgetown	L 57−93	2−3	12 – Fulmore	8 – Willard	5 – Tied	McDonough Arena (329); Washington, D.C.
November 27, 2025*; 12:30 pm, ESPN+		vs. Tulane; Paradise Jam Harbor Division semifinals	L 61−64	2−4	22 – Walker	5 – Tied	5 – Pass	UVI Sports and Fitness Center; St. Thomas, USVI
November 28, 2025*; 12:30 pm, ESPN+		vs. North Dakota; Paradise Jam Harbor Division 3rd place game	W 65–57	3–4	11 – Watkins	7 – Watkins	3 – Fulmore	UVI Sports and Fitness Center; St. Thomas, USVI
December 7, 2025*; 2:00 pm, ESPN+		at East Carolina	L 53–64	3–5	14 – Corbett	10 – Fulmore	6 – Fox	Williams Arena (958); Greenville, NC
December 14, 2025*; 1:00 pm, FloCollege		Longwood	L 66–67	3–6	17 – Corbett	6 – Tied	5 – Pass	Schar Center (607); Elon, NC
December 17, 2025*; 7:00 pm, ESPN+		at UNC Greensboro	L 50–54	3–7	12 – Fulmore	6 – Corbett	2 – Fox	Bodford Arena (172); Greensboro, NC
December 21, 2025*; 1:00 pm, FloCollege		Norfolk State	W 58–41	4–7	14 – Tied	11 – Fulmore	5 – Pass	Schar Center (461); Elon, NC
December 30, 2025*; 7:00 pm, FloCollege		North Carolina Wesleyan	W 111−50	5−7	23 – Watkins	10 – Watkins	6 – Fox	Schar Center (563); Elon, NC
CAA regular season
January 2, 2026; 7:00 pm, FloCollege		Monmouth	L 62–77	5–8 (0–1)	15 – Tied	8 – Corbett	2 – Tied	Schar Center (612); Elon, NC
January 4, 2026; 1:00 pm, FloCollege		Hampton	W 84–75	6–8 (1–1)	28 – Corbett	12 – Shaw	5 – Pass	Schar Center (747); Elon, NC
January 9, 2026; 7:00 pm, FloCollege		at Campbell	L 52–62	6–9 (1–2)	17 – Corbett	5 – Fulmore	4 – Fox	Gore Arena (775); Buies Creek, NC
January 16, 2026; 7:00 pm, FloCollege		at UNC Wilmington	W 72–62	7–9 (2–2)	17 – Fox	7 – Walker	4 – Pass	Trask Coliseum (750); Wilmington, NC
January 18, 2026; 1:00 pm, FloCollege		at Charleston	L 64–87	7–10 (2–3)	21 – Anderson	7 – Walker	4 – Fox	TD Arena (815); Charleston, SC
January 23, 2026; 7:00 pm, FloCollege		North Carolina A&T	W 67–60	8–10 (3–3)	16 – Fox	7 – Watkins	2 – Shaw	Schar Center (817); Elon, NC
January 26, 2026; 12:00 pm, FloCollege		at Hampton	W 79–53	9–10 (4–3)	22 – Anderson	15 – Watkins	6 – Pass	Hampton Convocation Center (160); Hampton, VA
January 30, 2026; 6:00 pm, FloCollege		Charleston	L 69–77	9–11 (4–4)	19 – Anderson	9 – Walker	4 – Pass	Schar Center (731); Elon, NC
February 1, 2026; 3:00 pm, FloCollege		Towson	W 68–54	10–11 (5–4)	16 – Anderson	10 – Fulmore	7 – Pass	Schar Center (287); Elon, NC
February 6, 2026; 7:00 pm, FloCollege		at North Carolina A&T	L 61–67	10–12 (5–5)	14 – Anderson	8 – Fulmore	5 – Pass	Corbett Sports Center (1,014); Greensboro, NC
February 8, 2026; 1:00 pm, FloCollege		William & Mary	W 75–52	11–12 (6–5)	16 – Watkins	10 – Watkins	4 – Pass	Schar Center (653); Elon, NC
February 13, 2026; 6:00 pm, FloCollege		at Drexel	L 59–68	11–13 (6–6)	16 – Watkins	4 – Tied	4 – Tied	Daskalakis Athletic Center (335); Philadelphia, PA
February 20, 2026; 7:00 pm, FloCollege/WRAL		Campbell	W 68–54	12–13 (7–6)	16 – Corbett	8 – Fulmore	4 – Tied	Schar Center (808); Elon, NC
February 22, 2026; 1:00 pm, FloCollege/WRAL		Northeastern	W 70–57	13–13 (8–6)	12 – Fulmore	6 – Anderson	4 – Pass	Schar Center (833); Elon, NC
February 27, 2026; 6:00 pm, FloCollege		at Hofstra	W 58–56	14–13 (9–6)	15 – Fox	6 – Tied	4 – Pass	Mack Sports Complex (327); Hempstead, NY
March 1, 2026; 1:00 pm, FloCollege		at Stony Brook	L 58–62	14–14 (9–7)	19 – Corbett	5 – Tied	4 – Pass	Stony Brook Arena (717); Stony Brook, NY
March 5, 2026; 7:00 pm, FloCollege		at William & Mary	L 59–70	14–15 (9–8)	13 – Corbett	6 – Tied	4 – Pass	Kaplan Arena (1,083); Williamsburg, VA
March 7, 2026; 7:00 pm, FloCollege		UNC Wilmington	W 66–54	15–15 (10–8)	28 – Fulmore	10 – Fulmore	3 – Anderson	Schar Center (808); Elon, NC
CAA tournament
March 12, 2026; 8:30 pm, FloCollege	(6)	vs. (11) Hampton; Second Round	W 67–62	16–15	22 – Fulmore	13 – Watkins	7 – Pass	CareFirst Arena (1,400); Washington, D.C.
March 13, 2026; 8:30 pm, FloCollege	(6)	vs. (3) Drexel; Quarterfinals	L 53–68	16–16	17 – Fox	15 – Watkins	2 – Tied	CareFirst Arena (1,400); Washington, D.C.
*Non-conference game. ^{#}Rankings from AP Poll. (#) Tournament seedings in parentheses. All times are in Eastern.
