= 2025–26 Towson Tigers women's basketball team =

American college basketball season

2025–26 Towson Tigers women's basketball
- Conference: Coastal Athletic Association
- Record: 17–14 (10–8 CAA)
- Head coach: Laura Harper (4th season)
- Associate head coach: Eric Atkins
- Assistant coaches: Tony DiClemente; Zion Sanders; Lorie Khalil; Nick Boboshko
- Home arena: SECU Arena

2025–26 CAA women's basketball standings
	Conf.				Overall
Team	W		L	PCT	W		L	PCT
Charleston †	16	–	2	.889	27	–	6	.818
Campbell	13	–	5	.722	20	–	12	.625
Drexel	13	–	5	.722	21	–	11	.656
Stony Brook	12	–	6	.667	18	–	15	.545
Monmouth	12	–	6	.667	21	–	12	.636
Elon	10	–	8	.556	16	–	16	.500
Towson	10	–	8	.556	17	–	14	.548
William & Mary	9	–	9	.500	17	–	14	.548
North Carolina A&T	7	–	11	.389	12	–	18	.400
Hofstra	6	–	12	.333	11	–	22	.333
Hampton	4	–	14	.222	10	–	21	.323
Northeastern	3	–	15	.167	7	–	22	.241
UNC Wilmington	2	–	16	.111	7	–	24	.226
† 2026 CAA tournament winner

The 2025–26 Towson Tigers women's basketball team represented Towson University during the 2025–26 NCAA Division I women's basketball season. The Tigers, led by fourth-year head coach Laura Harper, played their home games at SECU Arena in Towson, Maryland as members of the Coastal Athletic Association.

== Previous season ==
The Tigers finished the 2024–25 season 12–20, 8–10 in CAA play, to finish in a three-way tie for ninth place. They defeated Northeastern and 2024–25 Elon, before falling to Campbell in the quarterfinals of the CAA tournament.

== Preseason ==
On October 2, 2025, the Coastal Athletic Association released their preseason poll. Towson was picked to finish seventh in the conference.

=== Preseason rankings ===
CAA Preseason Poll
Place	Team	Votes
1	Charleston	139 (8)
2	Drexel	125 (2)
3	North Carolina A&T	124 (3)
4	Campbell	112
5	Elon	87
6	William & Mary	83
7	Towson	79
8	Monmouth	71
9	Hofstra	67
10	UNC Wilmington	39
11	Hampton	37
12	Stony Brook	33
13	Northeastern	18
(#) first-place votes

=== Preseason All-CAA Teams ===
Preseason All-CAA Teams
Team	Name	Class	Position
Second	India Johnston	Senior	Guard

== Roster ==
2025–26 Towson Tigers women's basketball team
Players
Coaches

Pos.	#	Name	Height	Year	Previous school	Hometown
G	0	Masyn Marchbanks	5 ft 8 in (1.73 m)	Sr	Samford	Hartselle, Alabama
F	1	Semaya Turner	5 ft 11 in (1.8 m)	Sr	Saint Francis	Rockaway, New Jersey
G	2	India Johnston	5 ft 8 in (1.73 m)	Sr	Caravel Academy	Bear, Delaware
G	3	Nadeya Regala	5 ft 9 in (1.75 m)	Fr	Elizabeth Seton High School	Waldorf, Maryland
G	4	Shariah Baynes	5 ft 6 in (1.68 m)	So	Paul VI High School	Philadelphia, Pennsylvania
F	5	Kayla Morris	6 ft 2 in (1.88 m)	RS Sr	Cal State Bakersfield	Harlem, New York
G	6	Viki Matulevicius	5 ft 8 in (1.73 m)	RS Fr	South Dakota	Willowbrook, Illinois
F/C	7	Hannah Dereje	6 ft 3 in (1.91 m)	GS	Elon	Burtonsville, Maryland
G	8	Jillian Watson	5 ft 7 in (1.7 m)	Fr	Northern Burlington High School	Chesterfield, New Jersey
G	9	Tilda Sjökvist	5 ft 7 in (1.7 m)	Sr	Missouri	Huskvarna, Sweden
G	11	Thalia Shepard	5 ft 9 in (1.75 m)	Jr	Merrimack	Boston, Massachusetts
G	13	Zoli Khalil	6 ft 0 in (1.83 m)	Jr	VCU	Rockingham, Virginia
G	15	Asya Lara Barnes	6 ft 0 in (1.83 m)	Fr	DME Academy	Istanbul, Turkey
F/C	25	Jaymee Wadey	6 ft 2 in (1.88 m)	Fr	Rowville Sports Academy	Melbourne, Australia
F	31	Aidan Langley	6 ft 1 in (1.85 m)	Fr	Westtown School	Coatesville, Pennsylvania

Head coach

- Laura Harper (Maryland)

Assistant coach(es)

- Eric Atkins (Notre Dame)
- Tony DiClemente (Stony Brook)
- Zion Sanders (Iowa)
- Lorie Khalil (Moravian)
- Nick Boboshko (Towson)

Legend

- (C) Team captain
- (S) Suspended
- (I) Ineligible
- (W) Walk-on
- Injured
- Current redshirt

Roster
Last update: May 19, 2026

== Schedule and results ==
Date time, TV	Rank^{#}	Opponent^{#}	Result	Record	Site (attendance) city, state
Non-conference regular season
November 4, 2025*; 6:00 pm, ACCNX		at Virginia Tech	L 56–100	0–1	Cassell Coliseum (4,184); Blacksburg, VA
November 7, 2025*; 6:30 pm, FloCollege		Frostburg State	W 100–37	1–1	SECU Arena (534); Towson, MD
November 11, 2025*; 5:00 pm, FloCollege		Stetson	W 76–54	2–1	SECU Arena (367); Towson, MD
November 13, 2025*; 7:00 pm, B1G+		at No. 9 Maryland	L 70–88	2–2	Xfinity Center (4,940); College Park, MD
November 16, 2025*; 2:00 pm, Monumental/FloCollege		Coppin State	W 65−54	3−2	SECU Arena (506); Towson, MD
November 23, 2025*; 5:00 pm, ESPN+		at UMBC	W 71−64	4−2	Chesapeake Employers Insurance Arena (731); Catonsville, MD
November 26, 2025*; 2:00 pm, ESPN+		at Georgetown	L 67–94	4–3	McDonough Arena (325); Washington, D.C.
November 30, 2025*; 2:00 pm, ESPN+		at Delaware	L 80–91	4–4	Bob Carpenter Center (963); Newark, DE
December 4, 2025*; 11:00 am, Monumental/FloCollege		Loyola (MD)	L 63–64 ^{OT}	4–5	SECU Arena (5,209); Towson, MD
December 17, 2025*; 6:00 pm		at Maryland Eastern Shore	W 87–86 ^{OT}	5–5	Hytche Athletic Center (225); Princess Anne, MD
December 20, 2025*; 12:00 pm, FloCollege		Lehigh	W 75–67	6–5	SECU Arena (305); Towson, MD
December 30, 2025*; 3:00 pm, Monumental/FloCollege		Morgan State	W 63−61	7−5	SECU Arena (583); Towson, MD
CAA regular season
January 2, 2026; 4:00 pm, Monumental/FloCollege		Campbell	W 57–54	8–5 (1–0)	SECU Arena (502); Towson, MD
January 9, 2026; 6:00 pm, FloCollege		at Hofstra	W 47–46	9–5 (2–0)	Mack Sports Complex (429); Hempstead, NY
January 11, 2026; 1:00 pm, FloCollege		UNC Wilmington	W 79–68	10–5 (3–0)	SECU Arena (522); Towson, MD
January 16, 2026; 7:00 pm, FloCollege		Monmouth	L 53–56	10–6 (3–1)	SECU Arena (616); Towson, MD
January 18, 2026; 12:00 pm, FloCollege		at Stony Brook	L 43–55	10–7 (3–2)	Stony Brook Arena (553); Stony Brook, NY
January 23, 2026; 11:00 am, FloCollege		Hofstra	W 58–55	11–7 (4–2)	SECU Arena (713); Towson, MD
January 24, 2026; 6:00 pm, FloCollege		at Drexel	L 45–68	11–8 (4–3)	Daskalakis Athletic Center (366); Philadelphia, PA
January 30, 2026; 5:00 pm, FloCollege		at North Carolina A&T	W 59–57	12–8 (5–3)	Corbett Sports Center (456); Greensboro, NC
February 1, 2026; 3:00 pm, FloCollege		at Elon	L 54–68	12–9 (5–4)	Schar Center (287); Elon, NC
February 6, 2026; 7:00 pm, Monumental/FloCollege		William & Mary	L 51–52	12–10 (5–5)	SECU Arena (611); Towson, MD
February 8, 2026; 1:00 pm, Monumental/FloCollege		Northeastern	W 63–55	13–10 (6–5)	SECU Arena (665); Towson, MD
February 13, 2026; 7:00 pm, FloCollege		at Hampton	W 69–44	14–10 (7–5)	Hampton Convocation Center (181); Hampton, VA
February 15, 2026; 1:00 pm, FloCollege		at William & Mary	L 70–75	14–11 (7–6)	Kaplan Arena (1,439); Williamsburg, VA
February 20, 2026; 7:00 pm, FloCollege		Charleston	L 78–88	14–12 (7–7)	SECU Arena (513); Towson, MD
February 22, 2026; 1:00 pm, Monumental/FloCollege		Stony Brook	W 73–68	15–12 (8–7)	SECU Arena (1,001); Towson, MD
February 27, 2026; 5:00 pm, FloCollege		at Campbell	W 63–55	16–12 (9–7)	Gore Arena (982); Buies Creek, NC
March 5, 2026; 7:00 pm, FloCollege		at Monmouth	L 77–83	16–13 (9–8)	OceanFirst Bank Center (542); West Long Branch, NJ
March 7, 2026; 2:00 pm, Monumental/FloCollege		Drexel	W 74–58	17–13 (10–8)	SECU Arena (576); Towson, MD
CAA tournament
March 12, 2026; 6:00 pm, FloCollege	(7)	vs. (10) Hofstra; Second Round	L 71–72	17–14	CareFirst Arena; Washington, D.C.
*Non-conference game. ^{#}Rankings from AP Poll. (#) Tournament seedings in parentheses. All times are in Eastern.
