= 2025–26 Stony Brook Seawolves women's basketball team =

American college basketball season

2025–26 Stony Brook Seawolves women's basketball
- Conference: Coastal Athletic Association
- Record: 18–15 (12–6 CAA)
- Head coach: Joy McCorvey (2nd season)
- Assistant coaches: Anjalé Barrett; Kiah Gillespie; Evan Turkish
- Home arena: Stony Brook Arena

2025–26 CAA women's basketball standings
	Conf.				Overall
Team	W		L	PCT	W		L	PCT
Charleston †	16	–	2	.889	27	–	6	.818
Campbell	13	–	5	.722	20	–	12	.625
Drexel	13	–	5	.722	21	–	11	.656
Stony Brook	12	–	6	.667	18	–	15	.545
Monmouth	12	–	6	.667	21	–	12	.636
Elon	10	–	8	.556	16	–	16	.500
Towson	10	–	8	.556	17	–	14	.548
William & Mary	9	–	9	.500	17	–	14	.548
North Carolina A&T	7	–	11	.389	12	–	18	.400
Hofstra	6	–	12	.333	11	–	22	.333
Hampton	4	–	14	.222	10	–	21	.323
Northeastern	3	–	15	.167	7	–	22	.241
UNC Wilmington	2	–	16	.111	7	–	24	.226
† 2026 CAA tournament winner

The 2025–26 Stony Brook Seawolves women's basketball team represented Stony Brook University during the 2025–26 NCAA Division I women's basketball season. The Seawolves, led by second-year head coach Joy McCorvey, played their home games at Stony Brook Arena in Stony Brook, New York as members of the Coastal Athletic Association.

== Previous season ==
The Seawolves finished the 2024–25 season 12–18, 7–11 in CAA play, to finish in 12th place. They were defeated by Hampton in the first round of the CAA tournament.

== Preseason ==
On October 2, 2025, the Coastal Athletic Association released their preseason poll. Stony Brook was picked to finish 12th in the conference.

=== Preseason rankings ===
CAA Preseason Poll
Place	Team	Votes
1	Charleston	139 (8)
2	Drexel	125 (2)
3	North Carolina A&T	124 (3)
4	Campbell	112
5	Elon	87
6	William & Mary	83
7	Towson	79
8	Monmouth	71
9	Hofstra	67
10	UNC Wilmington	39
11	Hampton	37
12	Stony Brook	33
13	Northeastern	18
(#) first-place votes

=== Preseason All-CAA Teams ===
No players were named to the First or Second All-CAA Teams.

== Roster ==
2025–26 Stony Brook Seawolves women's basketball team
Players
Coaches

Pos.	#	Name	Height	Year	Previous school	Hometown
G	2	Nal'La Bennett	5 ft 6 in (1.68 m)	Fr	Friends' Central School	Sicklerville, New Jersey
G	3	Janay Brantley	6 ft 0 in (1.83 m)	Jr	Catskill High School	Catskill, New York
G	4	Ioanna Giannopoulou	5 ft 2 in (1.57 m)	So	Townsend Harris High School	Queens, New York
G	5	Ebere Egbirika	5 ft 8 in (1.73 m)	Jr	Odessa College	London, England
F	8	Johanna Potter	6 ft 0 in (1.83 m)	Fr	Wesleyan School	Stockbridge, Georgia
G	9	Chloe Oliver	5 ft 8 in (1.73 m)	Jr	Davidson	Montreal, Quebec
G	10	Diaka Berete	5 ft 9 in (1.75 m)	GS	Jackson State	Toronto, Ontario
F	12	Alonna Sellers	6 ft 1 in (1.85 m)	GS	Central Connecticut	Hampton, Virginia
F	13	Alex Brown	6 ft 1 in (1.85 m)	Fr	Osbourn Park High School	Manassas, Virginia
F	15	Melissa Mwanza	6 ft 2 in (1.88 m)	Jr	Louisiana Tech	Harare, Zimbabwe
G	20	Sandra Frau Garcia	5 ft 7 in (1.7 m)	GS	UIC	Pego, Spain
F	21	Caitlin Frost	6 ft 1 in (1.85 m)	So	St. Bonaventure	Les Coteaux, Quebec
G	22	Delaney Cooper	5 ft 9 in (1.75 m)	Fr	Woodward Academy	Atlanta, Georgia
F	23	Lauren Filien	6 ft 1 in (1.85 m)	Sr	The Winchendon School	Cohoes, New York
G	30	Khalis Whiting	5 ft 6 in (1.68 m)	Sr	Abington High School	Philadelphia, Pennsylvania

Head coach

- Joy McCorvey (St. John's)

Assistant coach(es)

- Anjalé Barrett (Maryland)
- Kiah Gillespie (Florida State)
- Evan Turkish (American)

Legend

- (C) Team captain
- (S) Suspended
- (I) Ineligible
- (W) Walk-on
- Injured
- Current redshirt

Roster
Last update: May 12, 2026

== Schedule and results ==
Date time, TV	Rank^{#}	Opponent^{#}	Result	Record	Site (attendance) city, state
Exhibition
October 30, 2025*; 6:31 pm		Queens (NY)	W 85–43	–	Stony Brook Arena (138); Stony Brook, NY
Non-conference regular season
November 4, 2025*; 7:00 pm, ACCNX		at Syracuse	L 50–74	0–1	JMA Wireless Dome (2,052); Syracuse, NY
November 7, 2025*; 6:31 pm, FloCollege		Molloy	W 91–59	1–1	Stony Brook Arena (684); Stony Brook, NY
November 9, 2025*; 2:00 pm, B1G+		at Rutgers	W 71–54	2–1	Jersey Mike's Arena (1,623); Piscataway, NJ
November 12, 2025*; 6:00 pm, ESPN+		at Fordham	L 52–58	2–2	Rose Hill Gymnasium (392); Bronx, NY
November 19, 2025*; 7:00 pm, ESPN+		at Marist	L 51–55	2–3	McCann Arena (752); Poughkeepsie, NY
November 24, 2025*; 12:00 pm, ESPN+		at Georgia State; Georgia State Thanksgiving Classic	L 61−62	2−4	GSU Convocation Center (1,154); Atlanta, GA
November 25, 2025*; 2:30 pm		vs. Central Arkansas; Georgia State Thanksgiving Classic	L 42−70	2−5	GSU Convocation Center (1,207); Atlanta, GA
November 26, 2025*; 2:30 pm		vs. Samford; Georgia State Thanksgiving Classic	L 48–58	2–6	GSU Convocation Center (1,130); Atlanta, GA
December 1, 2025*; 6:31 pm, SNY/FloCollege		NJCU	W 85–38	3–6	Stony Brook Arena (347); Stony Brook, NY
December 5, 2025*; 11:00 am, ESPN+		at Harvard	L 33–67	3–7	Lavietes Pavilion (1,147); Cambridge, MA
December 10, 2025*; 7:00 pm, SNY/FloCollege		St. John's	L 42–73	3–8	Stony Brook Arena (500); Stony Brook, NY
December 14, 2025*; 1:00 pm, FloCollege		Duquesne	W 52–39	4–8	Stony Brook Arena (292); Stony Brook, NY
December 17, 2025*; 11:00 am, SNY/FloCollege		Georgian Court	W 75−50	5−8	Stony Brook Arena (1,004); Stony Brook, NY
CAA regular season
January 2, 2026; 7:00 pm, FloCollege		at Hampton	L 54–63	5–9 (0–1)	Hampton Convocation Center (516); Hampton, VA
January 4, 2026; 1:00 pm, FloCollege		at William & Mary	W 73–57 ^{OT}	6–9 (1–1)	Kaplan Arena (1,114); Williamsburg, VA
January 9, 2026; 6:31 pm, FloCollege		Drexel	W 57–53	7–9 (2–1)	Stony Brook Arena (552); Stony Brook, NY
January 11, 2026; 1:00 pm, SNY/FloCollege		North Carolina A&T	W 56–51	8–9 (3–1)	Stony Brook Arena (454); Stony Brook, NY
January 16, 2026; 6:00 pm, FloCollege/MSGSN		at Hofstra; Battle of Long Island	W 61–44	9–9 (4–1)	Mack Sports Complex (466); Hempstead, NY
January 18, 2026; 12:00 pm, SNY/FloCollege		Towson	W 55–43	10–9 (5–1)	Stony Brook Arena (553); Stony Brook, NY
January 23, 2026; 6:00 pm, FloCollege		at Drexel	L 41–49	10–10 (5–2)	Daskalakis Athletic Center (703); Philadelphia, PA
January 30, 2026; 6:31 pm, SNY/FloCollege		Hofstra; Battle of Long Island	W 52–49	11–10 (6–2)	Stony Brook Arena (688); Stony Brook, NY
February 1, 2026; 1:00 pm, SNY/FloCollege		Monmouth	W 61–51	12–10 (7–2)	Stony Brook Arena (845); Stony Brook, NY
February 6, 2026; 6:31 pm, SNY/FloCollege		Northeastern	W 64–55	13–10 (8–2)	Stony Brook Arena (630); Stony Brook, NY
February 13, 2026; 7:00 pm, SNY/FloCollege		at Monmouth	W 68–60	14–10 (9–2)	OceanFirst Bank Center (648); West Long Branch, NJ
February 15, 2026; 1:00 pm, FloCollege		at Northeastern	L 60–73	14–11 (9–3)	Cabot Center (243); Boston, MA
February 20, 2026; 6:31 pm, SNY/FloCollege		UNC Wilmington	W 60–55	15–11 (10–3)	Stony Brook Arena (844); Stony Brook, NY
February 22, 2026; 1:00 pm, FloCollege		at Towson	L 68–73	15–12 (10–4)	SECU Arena (1,001); Towson, MD
February 27, 2026; 6:31 pm, SNY/FloCollege		Hampton	W 67–58	16–12 (11–4)	Stony Brook Arena (451); Stony Brook, NY
March 1, 2026; 1:00 pm, FloCollege		Elon	W 62–58	17–12 (12–4)	Stony Brook Arena (717); Stony Brook, NY
March 5, 2026; 7:00 pm, FloCollege		at Charleston	L 43–66	17–13 (12–5)	TD Arena (410); Charleston, SC
March 7, 2026; 2:00 pm, FloCollege		at Campbell	L 41–55	17–14 (12–6)	Gore Arena (1,063); Buies Creek, NC
CAA tournament
March 13, 2026; 2:30 pm, FloCollege	(4)	vs. (5) Monmouth; Quarterfinals	W 51–45	18–14	CareFirst Arena (1,300); Washington, D.C.
March 14, 2026; 2:00 pm, FloCollege	(4)	vs. (1) Charleston; Semifinals	L 49–79	18–15	CareFirst Arena; Washington, D.C.
*Non-conference game. ^{#}Rankings from AP Poll. (#) Tournament seedings in parentheses. All times are in Eastern.
