= 2025–26 Northeastern Huskies women's basketball team =

American college basketball season

2025–26 Northeastern Huskies women's basketball
- Conference: Coastal Athletic Association
- Record: 7–22 (3–15 CAA)
- Head coach: Priscilla Edwards-Lloyd (3rd season)
- Assistant coaches: Sean Smith; Nicole Ambrose; Jay Yve Modi; Natalie Gallant
- Home arena: Cabot Center

2025–26 CAA women's basketball standings
	Conf.				Overall
Team	W		L	PCT	W		L	PCT
Charleston †	16	–	2	.889	27	–	6	.818
Campbell	13	–	5	.722	20	–	12	.625
Drexel	13	–	5	.722	21	–	11	.656
Stony Brook	12	–	6	.667	18	–	15	.545
Monmouth	12	–	6	.667	21	–	12	.636
Elon	10	–	8	.556	16	–	16	.500
Towson	10	–	8	.556	17	–	14	.548
William & Mary	9	–	9	.500	17	–	14	.548
North Carolina A&T	7	–	11	.389	12	–	18	.400
Hofstra	6	–	12	.333	11	–	22	.333
Hampton	4	–	14	.222	10	–	21	.323
Northeastern	3	–	15	.167	7	–	22	.241
UNC Wilmington	2	–	16	.111	7	–	24	.226
† 2026 CAA tournament winner

The 2025–26 Northeastern Huskies women's basketball team represented Northeastern University during the 2025–26 NCAA Division I women's basketball season. The Huskies, led by third-year head coach Priscilla Edwards-Lloyd, played their home games at the Cabot Center in Boston, Massachusetts as members of the Coastal Athletic Association.

== Previous season ==
The Huskies finished the 2024–25 season 3–25, 2–16 in CAA play, to finish in 14th (last) place. They were defeated by Towson in the first round of the CAA tournament.

== Preseason ==
On October 2, 2025, the Coastal Athletic Association released their preseason poll. Northeastern was picked to finish last (13th) in the conference.

=== Preseason rankings ===
CAA Preseason Poll
Place	Team	Votes
1	Charleston	139 (8)
2	Drexel	125 (2)
3	North Carolina A&T	124 (3)
4	Campbell	112
5	Elon	87
6	William & Mary	83
7	Towson	79
8	Monmouth	71
9	Hofstra	67
10	UNC Wilmington	39
11	Hampton	37
12	Stony Brook	33
13	Northeastern	18
(#) first-place votes

=== Preseason All-CAA Teams ===
No players were named to the All-CAA Preseason First or Second Teams, but Junior guard Yirsy Quéliz received honorable mention honors.

== Roster ==
2025–26 Northeastern Huskies women's basketball team
Players
Coaches

Pos.	#	Name	Height	Year	Previous school	Hometown
G	0	Nariyah Simmons	5 ft 2 in (1.57 m)	GS	Austin Peay	St. Louis, Missouri
G	1	Kailee Beaudion-Foliaki	6 ft 0 in (1.83 m)	Fr	Hightower High School	Houston, Texas
G	2	Camryn Collins	5 ft 9 in (1.75 m)	So	Rider	Foxborough, Massachusetts
G	3	Beatriz Pérez Pulgar	5 ft 7 in (1.7 m)	Fr	IES Diego Velazquez	Galapagar, Spain
F	5	Justice Tramble	6 ft 1 in (1.85 m)	So	South Carolina State	Canton, Michigan
G	11	Morgan Matthews	6 ft 0 in (1.83 m)	So	George Washington	Lawrenceville, New Jersey
G	12	Lindsey Lemay	5 ft 11 in (1.8 m)	Fr	Tilton School	Barrington, Rhode Island
F	13	Andrea Martinez	6 ft 1 in (1.85 m)	Jr	Gardner–Webb	Barcelona, Spain
F	14	Taylor Holohan	6 ft 2 in (1.88 m)	So	Averill Park High School	Averill Park, New York
G	15	Yirsy Quéliz	5 ft 4 in (1.63 m)	Jr	St. Mary's High School	La Vega, Dominican Republic
C	20	Alyssa Staten	6 ft 2 in (1.88 m)	So	Statesboro High School	Statesboro, Georgia
F	23	Maya Summerville	6 ft 0 in (1.83 m)	So	Morristown High School	Morristown, New Jersey
G	25	Natalie Larrañaga	5 ft 9 in (1.75 m)	RS Sr	Florida National	Guatemala City, Guatemala
G	33	María Sánchez Pitarch	5 ft 8 in (1.73 m)	So	Cambridge House Community College	Rocafort, Spain

Head coach

- Priscilla Edwards-Lloyd (St. Bonaventure)

Assistant coach(es)

- Sean Smith (Rutgers)
- Nicole Ambrose (Louisville)
- Jay Yve Modi (Lehman)
- Natalie Gallant (Gordon)

Legend

- (C) Team captain
- (S) Suspended
- (I) Ineligible
- (W) Walk-on
- Injured
- Current redshirt

Roster
Last update: May 28, 2026

== Schedule and results ==
Date time, TV	Rank^{#}	Opponent^{#}	Result	Record	Site (attendance) city, state
Non-conference regular season
November 3, 2025*; 4:00 pm, FloCollege		LIU	L 60–75	0–1	Cabot Center (254); Boston, MA
November 7, 2025*; 6:00 pm, ESPN+		at Yale	W 75–64	1–1	John J. Lee Amphitheater (524); New Haven, CT
November 11, 2025*; 2:00 pm, NESN/FloCollege		Boston University	L 57–61	1–2	Cabot Center (376); Boston, MA
November 15, 2025*; 3:00 pm, ESPN+		at Merrimack	L 65–83	1–3	Hammel Court (694); North Andover, MA
November 18, 2025*; 11:00 am, ESPN+		at Providence	L 45−50	1−4	Alumni Hall (1,108); Providence, RI
November 22, 2025*; 1:00 pm, FloCollege		Sacred Heart	W 68−60	2−4	Cabot Center (321); Boston, MA
November 25, 2025*; 6:00 pm, NESN+/ESPN+		at UMass Lowell	W 51–46	3–4	Kennedy Family Athletic Complex (209); Lowell, MA
November 28, 2025*; 7:00 pm, B1G+		at Rutgers	L 56–79	3–5	Jersey Mike's Arena (1,537); Piscataway, NJ
December 3, 2025*; 4:00 pm, NESN/FloCollege		UMass	L 52–71	3–6	Cabot Center (388); Boston, MA
December 19, 2025*; 12:00 pm, ACCNX		at Boston College	W 73–67	4–6	Conte Forum (626); Chestnut Hill, MA
CAA regular season
January 2, 2026; 7:00 pm, FloCollege		at UNC Wilmington	L 67–69	4–7 (0–1)	Trask Coliseum (824); Wilmington, NC
January 4, 2026; 1:00 pm, FloCollege		at Charleston	L 58−85	4−8 (0–2)	TD Arena (670); Charleston, SC
January 9, 2026; 7:00 pm, NESN+/FloCollege		North Carolina A&T	L 83–84 ^{2OT}	4–9 (0–3)	Cabot Center (210); Boston, MA
January 11, 2026; 1:00 pm, FloCollege		Monmouth	W 72–67	5–9 (1–3)	Cabot Center (287); Boston, MA
January 16, 2026; 7:00 pm, NESN+/FloCollege		Campbell	L 51–61	5–10 (1–4)	Cabot Center (167); Boston, MA
January 18, 2026; 2:00 pm, FloCollege		at Hofstra	W 62–60	6–10 (2–4)	Mack Sports Complex (605); Hempstead, NY
January 23, 2026; 5:30 pm, FloCollege		William & Mary	L 50–63	6–11 (2–5)	Cabot Center (157); Boston, MA
January 25, 2026; 2:00 pm, FloCollege		at Monmouth	Postponed due to Winter Storm Fern		OceanFirst Bank Center; West Long Branch, NJ
January 28, 2026; 11:00 am, FloCollege		at Monmouth; Rescheduled from January 25	L 56–65	6–12 (2–6)	OceanFirst Bank Center (291); West Long Branch, NJ
February 1, 2026; 1:00 pm, NESN/FloCollege		Drexel	L 56–65	6–13 (2–7)	Cabot Center (281); Boston, MA
February 6, 2026; 6:30 pm, FloCollege		at Stony Brook	L 55–64	6–14 (2–8)	Stony Brook Arena (630); Stony Brook, NY
February 8, 2026; 1:00 pm, FloCollege		at Towson	L 55–63	6–15 (2–9)	SECU Arena (665); Towson, MD
February 13, 2026; 7:00 pm, NESN+/FloCollege		Charleston	L 47–69	6–16 (2–10)	Cabot Center (165); Boston, MA
February 15, 2026; 1:00 pm, FloCollege		Stony Brook	W 73–60	7–16 (3–10)	Cabot Center (243); Boston, MA
February 20, 2026; 7:00 pm, FloCollege		at North Carolina A&T	L 86–89 ^{3OT}	7–17 (3–11)	Corbett Sports Center (1,044); Greensboro, NC
February 22, 2026; 1:00 pm, FloCollege		at Elon	L 57–70	7–18 (3–12)	Schar Center (833); Elon, NC
February 27, 2026; 6:00 pm, FloCollege		at Drexel	L 61–72	7–19 (3–13)	Daskalakis Athletic Center (776); Philadelphia, PA
March 1, 2026; 1:00 pm, NESN+/FloCollege		Hampton	L 71–77	7–20 (3–14)	Cabot Center (289); Boston, MA
March 7, 2026; 1:00 pm, NESN+/FloCollege		Hofstra	L 46–62	7–21 (3–15)	Cabot Center (204); Boston, MA
CAA tournament
March 11, 2026; 2:00 pm, FloCollege	(12)	vs. (13) UNC Wilmington; First Round	L 50–51	7–22	CareFirst Arena (1,100); Washington, D.C.
*Non-conference game. ^{#}Rankings from AP Poll. (#) Tournament seedings in parentheses. All times are in Eastern.
