= 2025–26 Hampton Lady Pirates basketball team =

American college basketball season

2025–26 Hampton Lady Pirates basketball
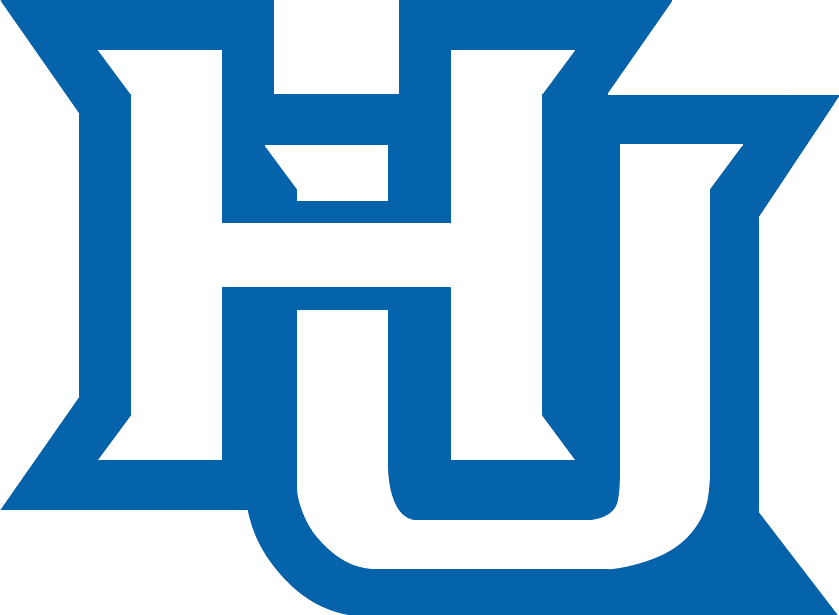
- Conference: Coastal Athletic Association
- Record: 10–21 (4–14 CAA)
- Head coach: Tamisha Augustin (2nd season)
- Assistant coaches: Jaamal Rhodes; Brooke Moore
- Home arena: Hampton Convocation Center

2025–26 CAA women's basketball standings
	Conf.				Overall
Team	W		L	PCT	W		L	PCT
Charleston †	16	–	2	.889	27	–	6	.818
Campbell	13	–	5	.722	20	–	12	.625
Drexel	13	–	5	.722	21	–	11	.656
Stony Brook	12	–	6	.667	18	–	15	.545
Monmouth	12	–	6	.667	21	–	12	.636
Elon	10	–	8	.556	16	–	16	.500
Towson	10	–	8	.556	17	–	14	.548
William & Mary	9	–	9	.500	17	–	14	.548
North Carolina A&T	7	–	11	.389	12	–	18	.400
Hofstra	6	–	12	.333	11	–	22	.333
Hampton	4	–	14	.222	10	–	21	.323
Northeastern	3	–	15	.167	7	–	22	.241
UNC Wilmington	2	–	16	.111	7	–	24	.226
† 2026 CAA tournament winner

The 2025–26 Hampton Lady Pirates basketball team represented Hampton University during the 2025–26 NCAA Division I women's basketball season. The Lady Pirates, led by second-year head coach Tamisha Augustin, played their home games at the Hampton Convocation Center in Hampton, Virginia as members of the Coastal Athletic Association (CAA). The Lady Pirates finished the season 10–21, 4–14 in CAA play, to finish in 11th place. They were defeated by in Elon the second round of the CAA tournament.

== Previous season ==
The Lady Pirates finished the 2024–25 season 8–23, 3–15 in CAA play, to finish in 13th place. They defeated Stony Brook, before falling to Monmouth in the second round of the CAA tournament.

== Preseason ==
On October 2, 2025, the Coastal Athletic Association released their preseason poll. Hampton was picked to finish eleventh in the conference.

=== Preseason rankings ===
CAA Preseason Poll
Place	Team	Votes
1	Charleston	139 (8)
2	Drexel	125 (2)
3	North Carolina A&T	124 (3)
4	Campbell	112
5	Elon	87
6	William & Mary	83
7	Towson	79
8	Monmouth	71
9	Hofstra	67
10	UNC Wilmington	39
11	Hampton	37
12	Stony Brook	33
13	Northeastern	18
(#) first-place votes

=== Preseason All-CAA Teams ===
No players were named to the All-CAA Preseason First or Second Teams.

== Roster ==
2025–26 Hampton Lady Pirates women's basketball team
Players
Coaches

Pos.	#	Name	Height	Year	Previous school	Hometown
G	0	Aaryn Battle	5 ft 10 in (1.78 m)	Jr	Pittsburgh	Sewell, NJ
F	1	Le'Asia Foreman	5 ft 8 in (1.73 m)	Sr	Norview High School	Norfolk, VA
G	3	Olivia Smith	5 ft 5 in (1.65 m)	Sr	Eastern Michigan	Fort Wayne, IN
G	4	Arlisha Boston	5 ft 11 in (1.8 m)	Jr	King's Fork High School	Suffolk, VA
G	5	Diamond Wiggins	5 ft 10 in (1.78 m)	Jr	Monmouth	Norfolk, VA
G	10	Tyra Kennedy	5 ft 7 in (1.7 m)	Jr	Brooks-DeBartolo Collegiate High School	Tampa, FL
C	11	Janaye Walker	6 ft 3 in (1.91 m)	Fr	Baldwin High School	Milledgeville, GA
G	14	Kayla Lezama	6 ft 0 in (1.83 m)	Jr	Boston College	Boston, MA
G	15	Kiki McElrath	5 ft 7 in (1.7 m)	Jr	Delaware State	Columbus, OH
F	20	Taylor Gibson	6 ft 2 in (1.88 m)	Sr	UCF	Upper Marlboro, MD
F	23	Kiya Dorroh	6 ft 1 in (1.85 m)	Sr	UT Martin	Tucson, AZ
F	24	Aisha Dabo	6 ft 2 in (1.88 m)	GS	UMass	Queens, NY
F	25	Tiani Abrams	6 ft 1 in (1.85 m)	Sr	Northern Colorado	Vista, CA
F	34	Akilah Shelton	6 ft 2 in (1.88 m)	Fr	Hardaway High School	Columbus, GA

Head coach

- Tamisha Augustin (Alabama A&M)

Assistant coach(es)

- Jaamal Rhodes (Augusta State)
- Brooke Moore (Purdue)

Legend

- (C) Team captain
- (S) Suspended
- (I) Ineligible
- (W) Walk-on
- Injured
- Current redshirt

Roster
Last update: May 27, 2026

== Schedule and results ==
Date time, TV	Rank^{#}	Opponent^{#}	Result	Record	Site (attendance) city, state
Non-conference regular season
November 5, 2025*; 7:00 p.m., FloCollege		Apprentice School	W 105–21	1–0	Hampton Convocation Center (698); Hampton, VA
November 9, 2025*; 2:00 p.m., ACCNX		at Wake Forest	L 48–77	1–1	LJVM Coliseum (1,071); Winston-Salem, NC
November 16, 2025*; 2:00 p.m., ESPN+		at Gardner–Webb	L 35–55	1–2	Paul Porter Arena (140); Boiling Springs, NC
November 21, 2025*; 5:30 p.m., ESPN+		at Norfolk State; Battle of the Bay	W 57–55	2–2	Echols Hall (2,001); Norfolk, VA
November 24, 2025*; 7:00 p.m., Monumental/FloCollege		Delaware State	W 76–59	3–2	Hampton Convocation Center (478); Hampton, VA
November 27, 2025*; 12:00 p.m.		vs. Stephen F. Austin; Puerto Rico Clasico	L 61−67	3−3	Roberto Clemente Coliseum (200); San Juan, PR
November 29, 2025*; 9:00 a.m.		vs. Buffalo; Puerto Rico Clasico	W 58−56	4−3	Roberto Clemente Coliseum (100); San Juan, PR
December 5, 2025*; 2:00 p.m.		vs. Livingstone; HBCU Hoops Invitational	W 82–66	5–3	State Farm Field House (150); Kissimmee, FL
December 6, 2025*; 3:30 p.m.		vs. Edward Waters; HBCU Hoops Invitational	W 65–47	6–3	State Farm Field House (311); Kissimmee, FL
December 13, 2025*; 12:00 p.m., ESPN+		vs. Howard; Battle of the Real HU	L 60–64	6–4	CareFirst Arena (2,471); Washington, D.C.
December 18, 2025*; 11:00 a.m., FloCollege		Radford	L 67–73 ^{OT}	6–5	Hampton Convocation Center (1,072); Hampton, VA
December 29, 2025*; 1:00 p.m., ESPN+		at Eastern Kentucky	L 52–70	6–6	Baptist Health Arena (249); Richmond, KY
CAA regular season
January 2, 2026; 7:00 p.m., Monumental/FloCollege		Stony Brook	W 63−54	7−6 (1–0)	Hampton Convocation Center (516); Hampton, VA
January 4, 2026; 1:00 p.m., FloCollege		at Elon	L 75–84	7–7 (1–1)	Schar Center (747); Elon, NC
January 11, 2026; 1:00 p.m., Monumental/FloCollege		Charleston	L 75–88	7–8 (1–2)	Hampton Convocation Center (527); Hampton, VA
January 16, 2026; 7:00 p.m., FloCollege		at William & Mary	W 59–49	8–8 (2–2)	Kaplan Arena (1,032); Williamsburg, VA
January 18, 2026; 2:00 p.m., FloCollege		at North Carolina A&T	L 57–70	8–9 (2–3)	Corbett Sports Center (1,304); Greensboro, NC
January 23, 2026; 7:00 p.m., Monumental/FloCollege		Campbell	L 43–58	8–10 (2–4)	Hampton Convocation Center (578); Hampton, VA
January 26, 2026; 12:00 p.m., Monumental/FloCollege		Elon	L 53–79	8–11 (2–5)	Hampton Convocation Center (160); Hampton, VA
January 30, 2026; 7:00 p.m., FloCollege		at UNC Wilmington	W 60–48	9–11 (3–5)	Trask Coliseum (759); Wilmington, NC
February 1, 2026; 7:00 p.m., Monumental/FloCollege		North Carolina A&T	L 57–62	9–12 (3–6)	Hampton Convocation Center (427); Hampton, VA
February 6, 2026; 6:00 p.m., FloCollege		at Drexel	L 42–75	9–13 (3–7)	Daskalakis Athletic Center (697); Philadelphia, PA
February 8, 2026; 2:00 p.m., FloCollege		at Hofstra	L 59–75	9–14 (3–8)	Mack Sports Complex (387); Hempstead, NY
February 13, 2026; 7:00 p.m., Monumental/FloCollege		Towson	L 44–69	9–15 (3–9)	Hampton Convocation Center (181); Hampton, VA
February 20, 2026; 7:00 p.m., Monumental/FloCollege		Drexel	L 47–50	9–16 (3–10)	Hampton Convocation Center (1,078); Hampton, VA
February 22, 2026; 12:00 p.m., Monumental/FloCollege		Monmouth	L 57–64	9–17 (3–11)	Hampton Convocation Center (238); Hampton, VA
February 27, 2026; 6:31 p.m., FloCollege		at Stony Brook	L 58–67	9–18 (3–12)	Stony Brook Arena (451); Stony Brook, NY
March 1, 2026; 1:00 p.m., FloCollege		at Northeastern	W 77–71	10–18 (4–12)	Cabot Center (289); Boston, MA
March 5, 2026; 7:00 p.m., FloCollege		at Campbell	L 51–69	10–19 (4–13)	Gore Arena (907); Buies Creek, NC
March 7, 2026; 2:00 p.m., Monumental/FloCollege		William & Mary	L 60–61	10–20 (4–14)	Hampton Convocation Center (292); Hampton, VA
CAA tournament
March 12, 2026; 8:30 p.m., FloCollege	(11)	vs. (6) Elon; Second round	L 62–67	10–21	CareFirst Arena (1,400); Washington, D.C.
*Non-conference game. ^{#}Rankings from AP poll. (#) Tournament seedings in parentheses. All times are in Eastern.
