= 2025–26 Charleston Cougars women's basketball team =

American college basketball season

2025–26 Charleston Cougars women's basketball

CAA regular season & tournament champions

NCAA tournament, First Round
- Conference: Coastal Athletic Association
- Record: 27–6 (16–2 CAA)
- Head coach: Robin Harmony (7th season)
- Associate head coach: Randy Javier Schneider
- Assistant coaches: Greg Long; Chelsey Rhodes
- Home arena: TD Arena

2025–26 CAA women's basketball standings
	Conf.				Overall
Team	W		L	PCT	W		L	PCT
Charleston †	16	–	2	.889	27	–	6	.818
Campbell	13	–	5	.722	20	–	12	.625
Drexel	13	–	5	.722	21	–	11	.656
Stony Brook	12	–	6	.667	18	–	15	.545
Monmouth	12	–	6	.667	21	–	12	.636
Elon	10	–	8	.556	16	–	16	.500
Towson	10	–	8	.556	17	–	14	.548
William & Mary	9	–	9	.500	17	–	14	.548
North Carolina A&T	7	–	11	.389	12	–	18	.400
Hofstra	6	–	12	.333	11	–	22	.333
Hampton	4	–	14	.222	10	–	21	.323
Northeastern	3	–	15	.167	7	–	22	.241
UNC Wilmington	2	–	16	.111	7	–	24	.226
† 2026 CAA tournament winner

The 2025–26 Charleston Cougars women's basketball team represents the College of Charleston during the 2025–26 NCAA Division I women's basketball season. The Cougars, led by seventh-year head coach Robin Harmony, play their home games at TD Arena in Charleston, South Carolina, as members of the Coastal Athletic Association.

== Previous season ==
The Cougars finished the 2024–25 season 25–8, 14–4 in CAA play, to finish in second place. They defeated Delaware, before falling to Campbell in the semifinals of the CAA tournament. They received an at-large bid to the WNIT, where they defeated Howard in the second round, before falling to Rutgers in the Super 16.

== Preseason ==
On October 2, 2025, the Coastal Athletic Association released their preseason poll. Charleston was picked to finish atop the conference, with eight first-place votes.

=== Preseason rankings ===
CAA Preseason Poll
Place	Team	Votes
1	Charleston	139 (8)
2	Drexel	125 (2)
3	North Carolina A&T	124 (3)
4	Campbell	112
5	Elon	87
6	William & Mary	83
7	Towson	79
8	Monmouth	71
9	Hofstra	67
10	UNC Wilmington	39
11	Hampton	37
12	Stony Brook	33
13	Northeastern	18
(#) first-place votes

=== CAA Preseason Player of the Year ===
CAA Preseason Player of the Year
Name	Class	Position
Taryn Barbot	Junior	Guard

=== Preseason All-CAA teams ===
Preseason All-CAA team
Team	Name	Class	Position
First	Taryn Barbot	Junior	Guard
Second	Taylor Barbot	Junior	Guard

== Roster ==
2025–26 Charleston Cougars women's basketball team
Players
Coaches

Pos.	#	Name	Height	Year	Previous school	Hometown
G	0	Taylor Barbot	5 ft 9 in (1.75 m)	Jr	St. Mary's High School	Floral Park, New York
G	1	Leah Philpotts	5 ft 8 in (1.73 m)	So	Hamden High School	New Haven, Connecticut
G	3	Marissa Brown	6 ft 0 in (1.83 m)	Sr	Choctawhatchee High School	Fort Walton Beach, Florida
G	4	Aubrey Stevenson	5 ft 7 in (1.7 m)	Fr	Rock Hill High School	Rock Hill, South Carolina
G	5	Taryn Barbot	5 ft 10 in (1.78 m)	Jr	St. Mary's High School	Floral Park, New York
G	6	Sophia Tougas	6 ft 1 in (1.85 m)	RS Sr	Cal State Bakersfield	Glens Falls, New York
G	7	Jami Hill	5 ft 11 in (1.8 m)	Jr	St. Andrew's School	Kingston, Rhode Island
G	8	Camila De Pool	5 ft 7 in (1.7 m)	So	Fordham	Carolina, Puerto Rico
F	9	Naylee Cortes	5 ft 10 in (1.78 m)	Sr	Central Pointe Christian Academy	Bogotá, Colombia
G	10	Alana Philpotts	5 ft 8 in (1.73 m)	RS Fr	Hamden High School	New Haven, Connecticut
F	11	Danielle McTeer	6 ft 0 in (1.83 m)	RS Sr	Coppin State	Hampton, Virginia
G	15	Tyja Beans	5 ft 11 in (1.8 m)	Jr	Western Carolina	Daytona Beach, Florida
G	20	Anilys Rolon	5 ft 9 in (1.75 m)	Fr	Dr. Phillips High School	Orlando, Florida
F	21	Chynell Mitchell	6 ft 1 in (1.85 m)	GS	UT Rio Grande Valley	Austin, Texas
F	22	Grace Ezebilo	6 ft 1 in (1.85 m)	Jr	Tyler Junior College	Nando, Nigeria

Head coach

- Robin Harmony (Miami (FL))

Assistant coach(es)

- Randy Javier Schneider (FIU)
- Greg Long (Delta State)
- Chelsey Rhodes (Delta State)

Legend

- (C) Team captain
- (S) Suspended
- (I) Ineligible
- (W) Walk-on
- Injured
- Current redshirt

Roster
Last update: March 9, 2026

== Schedule and results ==
Date time, TV	Rank^{#}	Opponent^{#}	Result	Record	High points	High rebounds	High assists	Site (attendance) city, state
Non-conference regular season
November 3, 2025*; 4:00 pm, FloCollege		Covenant	W 135–41	1–0	32 – Tar. Barbot	11 – Ezebilo	9 – Tay. Barbot	TD Arena (289); Charleston, SC
November 7, 2025*; 11:00 am, FloCollege		Charleston Southern	W 80–65	2–0	22 – Tar. Barbot	18 – Ezebilo	10 – Tay. Barbot	TD Arena (3,617); Charleston, SC
November 14, 2025*; 4:00 pm, FloCollege		Iona	W 75–44	3–0	31 – Tar. Barbot	13 – Ezebilo	9 – Tay. Barbot	TD Arena (240); Charleston, SC
November 18, 2025*; 5:00 pm, ESPN+		at North Carolina Central	W 75–60	4–0	17 – Tay. Barbot	16 – Ezebilo	7 – Tay. Barbot	McDougald–McLendon Arena (592); Durham, NC
November 21, 2025*; 5:00 pm, ESPN+		at Quinnipiac	W 75−71	5−0	13 – Tied	11 – Ezebilo	6 – Tay. Barbot	M&T Bank Arena (458); Hamden, CT
November 27, 2025*; 2:00 pm, YouTube		vs. New Mexico State; Big Easy Classic	W 72−42	6−0	18 – Tar. Barbot	11 – Ezebilo	8 – Tay. Barbot	Alario Center (142); Westwego, LA
November 29, 2025*; 1:00 pm, YouTube		vs. High Point; Big Easy Classic	L 59–70	6–1	26 – Tar. Barbot	11 – Tar. Barbot	6 – Tay. Barbot	Alario Center (176); Westwego, LA
December 2, 2025*; 9:00 pm, ESPN+		at Colorado	L 47–66	6–2	22 – Tar. Barbot	10 – Ezebilo	7 – Tay. Barbot	CU Events Center (1,583); Boulder, CO
December 14, 2025*; 2:00 pm, ACCNX		at Florida State	W 75–70	7–2	20 – Tay. Barbot	12 – Ezebilo	8 – Tay. Barbot	Donald L. Tucker Center (1,108); Tallahassee, FL
December 19, 2025*; 1:15 pm, Facebook Live		vs. Cleveland State; Puerto Rico Clasico	L 61–67	7–3	10 – Ezebilo	9 – Ezebilo	5 – Tay. Barbot	Coliseo Rubén Rodríguez (100); Bayamón, PR
December 20, 2025*; 12:15 pm, Facebook Live		vs. UPR Mayagüez; Puerto Rico Clasico	W 114–40	8–3	17 – Tied	11 – Ezebilo	7 – Tay. Barbot	Coliseo Rubén Rodríguez (100); Bayamón, PR
CAA regular season
January 2, 2026; 7:00 pm, FloCollege		Hofstra	W 72−55	9−3 (1–0)	24 – Tar. Barbot	11 – Ezebilo	6 – Tied	TD Arena (433); Charleston, SC
January 4, 2026; 1:00 pm, FloCollege		Northeastern	W 85–58	10–3 (2–0)	29 – Tar. Barbot	10 – Ezebilo	6 – Tay. Barbot	TD Arena (670); Charleston, SC
January 9, 2026; 7:00 pm, FloCollege		at William & Mary	W 62–60	11–3 (3–0)	15 – Tar. Barbot	17 – Ezebilo	7 – Tay. Barbot	Kaplan Arena (1,008); Williamsburg, VA
January 11, 2026; 1:00 pm, FloCollege		at Hampton	W 88–75	12–3 (4–0)	24 – Beans	6 – Tied	11 – Tay. Barbot	Hampton Convocation Center (527); Hampton, VA
January 16, 2026; 7:00 pm, FloCollege		Drexel	W 74–64	13–3 (5–0)	25 – Tar. Barbot	12 – Ezebilo	6 – Tar. Barbot	TD Arena (437); Charleston, SC
January 18, 2026; 1:00 pm, FloCollege		Elon	W 87–64	14–3 (6–0)	20 – Tar. Barbot	13 – Ezebilo	6 – Tay. Barbot	TD Arena (815); Charleston, SC
January 23, 2026; 7:00 pm, FloCollege		at UNC Wilmington	W 71–37	15–3 (7–0)	20 – Hill	9 – Tar. Barbot	9 – Tar. Barbot	Trask Coliseum (1,102); Wilmington, NC
January 25, 2026; 1:00 pm, FloCollege		North Carolina A&T	W 71–62	16–3 (8–0)	18 – Tay. Barbot	6 – Tied	2 – Tied	TD Arena (620); Charleston, SC
January 30, 2026; 6:00 pm, FloCollege		at Elon	W 77–69	17–3 (9–0)	25 – Tar. Barbot	13 – Ezebilo	7 – Tar. Barbot	Schar Center; Elon, NC
February 3, 2026; 5:00 pm, FloCollege		at Campbell	W 61–49	18–3 (10–0)	19 – Tay. Barbot	24 – Ezebilo	4 – Tar. Barbot	Gore Arena (927); Buies Creek, NC
February 6, 2026; 7:00 pm, FloCollege		UNC Wilmington	W 81–61	19–3 (11–0)	15 – Ezebilo	19 – Ezebilo	7 – Tied	TD Arena (567); Charleston, SC
February 13, 2026; 7:00 pm, FloCollege		at Northeastern	W 69–47	20–3 (12–0)	22 – Tar. Barbot	13 – Ezebilo	6 – Tay. Barbot	Cabot Center (165); Boston, MA
February 15, 2026; 2:00 pm, FloCollege		at Monmouth	L 57–69	20–4 (12–1)	10 – Tied	11 – Ezebilo	3 – Tay. Barbot	OceanFirst Bank Center (1,781); West Long Branch, NJ
February 20, 2026; 7:00 pm, FloCollege		at Towson	W 88–78	21–4 (13–1)	36 – Tar. Barbot	19 – Ezebilo	5 – Tay. Barbot	SECU Arena (513); Towson, MD
February 27, 2026; 7:00 pm, FloCollege		William & Mary	W 70–48	22–4 (14–1)	22 – Tar. Barbot	5 – Tied	3 – Tied	TD Arena (747); Charleston, SC
March 1, 2026; 1:00 pm, FloCollege		Campbell	L 57–59	22–5 (14–2)	23 – Tar. Barbot	10 – Ezebilo	3 – Tar. Barbot	TD Arena (526); Charleston, SC
March 5, 2026; 7:00 pm, FloCollege		Stony Brook	W 66–43	23–5 (15–2)	21 – Tar. Barbot	14 – Ezebilo	7 – Tay. Barbot	TD Arena (410); Charleston, SC
March 7, 2026; 2:00 pm, FloCollege		at North Carolina A&T	W 70–64	24–5 (16–2)	18 – Tay. Barbot	7 – Ezebilo	8 – Tay. Barbot	Corbett Sports Center (693); Greensboro, NC
CAA tournament
March 13, 2026*; 12:00 pm, FloCollege	(1)	vs. (8) William & Mary; Quarterfinals	W 58–55	25–5	18 – Tougas	13 – Ezebilo	5 – Tied	CareFirst Arena; Washington, D.C.
March 14, 2026*; 2:00 pm, FloCollege	(1)	vs. (4) Stony Brook; Semifinals	W 79–49	26–5	24 – Tar. Barbot	7 – Tied	11 – Tay. Barbot	CareFirst Arena; Washington, D.C.
March 15, 2026*; 2:00 pm, CBSSN	(1)	vs. (10) Hofstra; Championship	W 68–56	27–5	23 – Tar. Barbot	16 – Ezebilo	8 – Tay. Barbot	CareFirst Arena (1,325); Washington, D.C.
NCAA Tournament
March 20, 2026*; 11:30 am, ESPN2	(14 S2)	vs. (3 S2) No. 8 Duke; First Round	L 64–81	27–6	36 – Tar. Barbot	15 – Ezebilo	5 – Tay. Barbot	Cameron Indoor Stadium (3,435); Durham, NC
*Non-conference game. ^{#}Rankings from AP Poll. (#) Tournament seedings in parentheses. All times are in Eastern.
