= 2025–26 William & Mary Tribe women's basketball team =

American college basketball season

2025–26 William & Mary Tribe women's basketball
- Conference: Coastal Athletic Association
- Record: 17–14 (9–9 CAA)
- Head coach: Erin Dickerson Davis (4th season)
- Associate head coach: Dane Sparrow
- Assistant coaches: Kenia Cole; Graceann Bennett
- Home arena: Kaplan Arena

2025–26 CAA women's basketball standings
	Conf.				Overall
Team	W		L	PCT	W		L	PCT
Charleston †	16	–	2	.889	27	–	6	.818
Campbell	13	–	5	.722	20	–	12	.625
Drexel	13	–	5	.722	21	–	11	.656
Stony Brook	12	–	6	.667	18	–	15	.545
Monmouth	12	–	6	.667	21	–	12	.636
Elon	10	–	8	.556	16	–	16	.500
Towson	10	–	8	.556	17	–	14	.548
William & Mary	9	–	9	.500	17	–	14	.548
North Carolina A&T	7	–	11	.389	12	–	18	.400
Hofstra	6	–	12	.333	11	–	22	.333
Hampton	4	–	14	.222	10	–	21	.323
Northeastern	3	–	15	.167	7	–	22	.241
UNC Wilmington	2	–	16	.111	7	–	24	.226
† 2026 CAA tournament winner

The 2025–26 William & Mary Tribe women's basketball team represented the College of William & Mary during the 2025–26 NCAA Division I women's basketball season. The Tribe, led by fourth-year head coach Erin Dickerson Davis, played their home games at Kaplan Arena in Williamsburg, Virginia as members of the Coastal Athletic Association.

== Previous season ==
The Tribe finished the 2024–25 season 16–19, 8–10 in CAA play, to finish in three-way tie for ninth place. As the #9 seed in the CAA tournament, they upset Hofstra, top-seeded North Carolina A&T, Drexel, and Campbell in the CAA tournament championship game, marking the first NCAA tournament appearance in school history for either of the women's or men's basketball teams. By winning the CAA tournament as the #9 seed, they became the lowest seeded in CAA history to ever win the CAA championship. In the tournament, they would receive the No. 16 seed in the Birmingham Regional 3, where they defeated fellow No. 16 seed High Point in the First Four, for the first NCAA tournament win in school history, before falling to #1 seed Texas in the First Round.

== Preseason ==
On October 2, 2025, the Coastal Athletic Association released their preseason poll. William & Mary was picked to finish sixth in the conference.

=== Preseason rankings ===
CAA Preseason Poll
Place	Team	Votes
1	Charleston	139 (8)
2	Drexel	125 (2)
3	North Carolina A&T	124 (3)
4	Campbell	112
5	Elon	87
6	William & Mary	83
7	Towson	79
8	Monmouth	71
9	Hofstra	67
10	UNC Wilmington	39
11	Hampton	37
12	Stony Brook	33
13	Northeastern	18
(#) first-place votes

=== Preseason All-CAA Teams ===
Preseason All-CAA Teams
Team	Name	Class	Position
Second	Cassidy Geddes	Junior	Guard

== Roster ==
2025–26 William & Mary Tribe women's basketball team
Players
Coaches

Pos.	#	Name	Height	Year	Previous school	Hometown
G	0	Alexa Mikeska	5 ft 8 in (1.73 m)	Sr	Carlsbad High School	Carlsbad, California
G	1	Cassidy Geddes	5 ft 7 in (1.7 m)	Jr	Newton-Conover High School	Hickory, North Carolina
G	2	Monet Dance	5 ft 3 in (1.6 m)	Jr	Mount Pisgah Christian School	Roswell, Georgia
G	3	Jordyn Steindl	5 ft 8 in (1.73 m)	Fr	Western Reserve Academy	State College, Pennsylvania
G	4	Ari Mercado	5 ft 5 in (1.65 m)	Fr	East New York Family Academy	Brooklyn, New York
G	7	Dynasti Pierce	6 ft 0 in (1.83 m)	Fr	Lafayette High School	Smithfield, Virginia
G	9	Kyah Smith	5 ft 9 in (1.75 m)	Jr	Navy	Richmond, Virginia
F	10	Marley Long	6 ft 2 in (1.88 m)	So	Sidwell Friends School	Washington, D.C.
G	11	Aislinn Gibson	6 ft 2 in (1.88 m)	Jr	Maine	Hingham, Massachusetts
C	12	Jana Sallman	6 ft 3 in (1.91 m)	Jr	Memphis	Cairo, Egypt
G	13	Sophia LeGoullon	6 ft 1 in (1.85 m)	So	Tilton School	Bedford, New Hampshire
F	15	Amelia Basit	6 ft 1 in (1.85 m)	Fr	St. Francis School	Suwanee, Georgia
F	21	Natalie Fox	6 ft 4 in (1.93 m)	So	Millbrook High School	LaGrangeville, New York
F	23	Aisha Dos Santos	6 ft 1 in (1.85 m)	Jr	Odessa College	São Bernardo, Brazil
G	24	Emma West	5 ft 10 in (1.78 m)	So	Georgetown Visitation Prep	Great Falls, Virginia

Head coach

- Erin Dickerson Davis (Northwestern)

Assistant coach(es)

- Dane Sparrow (UNC Greensboro)
- Kenia Cole (Hampton)
- Graceann Bennett (Georgetown)

Legend

- (C) Team captain
- (S) Suspended
- (I) Ineligible
- (W) Walk-on
- Injured
- Current redshirt

Roster
Last update: May 23, 2026

== Schedule and results ==
Date time, TV	Rank^{#}	Opponent^{#}	Result	Record	Site (attendance) city, state
Non-conference regular season
November 6, 2025*; 7:00 pm, ESPN+		at Davidson	L 50–71	0–1	John M. Belk Arena (795); Davidson, NC
November 9, 2025*; 1:00 pm, FloCollege		Barton	W 81–62	1–1	Kaplan Arena (1,007); Williamsburg, VA
November 12, 2025*; 7:00 pm, FloCollege		Richmond	L 58–84	1–2	Kaplan Arena (996); Williamsburg, VA
November 16, 2025*; 1:00 pm, FloCollege		Old Dominion; Rivalry	L 53–56	1–3	Kaplan Arena (1,081); Williamsburg, VA
November 23, 2025*; 2:00 pm, ESPN+		at Howard	L 53−64	1−4	Burr Gymnasium (739); Washington, D.C.
November 29, 2025*; 2:00 pm, ESPN+		at Tennessee State	W 64−53	2−4	Gentry Center; Nashville, TN
December 3, 2025*; 11:30 am, ACCNX		at Wake Forest	W 67–64	3–4	LJVM Coliseum (5,375); Winston-Salem, NC
December 7, 2025*; 2:00 pm, ESPN+		at American	W 73–60	4–4	Bender Arena (478); Washington, D.C.
December 13, 2025*; 1:00 pm, FloCollege/MASN		Coppin State	W 72–65	5–4	Kaplan Arena (793); Williamsburg, VA
December 19, 2025*; 11:00 am, ESPN+		at Stetson; Holiday Hoops Classic	W 81–75	6–4	Insight Credit Union Arena (575); DeLand, FL
December 20, 2025*; 1:15 pm		vs. Bethune–Cookman; Holiday Hoops Classic	W 64–52	7–4	Insight Credit Union Arena (605); DeLand, FL
CAA regular season
January 2, 2026; 7:00 pm, FloCollege		at North Carolina A&T	W 60−49	8−4 (1–0)	Corbett Sports Center (654); Greensboro, NC
January 4, 2026; 1:00 pm, FloCollege/MASN		Stony Brook	L 57–73 ^{OT}	8–5 (1–1)	Kaplan Arena (1,114); Williamsburg, VA
January 9, 2026; 7:00 pm, FloCollege/MASN		Charleston	L 60–62	8–6 (1–2)	Kaplan Arena (1,008); Williamsburg, VA
January 11, 2026; 2:00 pm, FloCollege		at Campbell	L 43–45	8–7 (1–3)	Gore Arena (873); Buies Creek, NC
January 16, 2026; 7:00 pm, FloCollege/MASN		Hampton	L 49–59	8–8 (1–4)	Kaplan Arena (1,032); Williamsburg, VA
January 23, 2026; 5:30 pm, FloCollege		at Northeastern	W 63–50	9–8 (2–4)	Cabot Center (157); Boston, MA
January 26, 2026; 3:00 pm, FloCollege/MSGSN		at Hofstra	W 55–37	10–8 (3–4)	Mack Sports Complex; Hempstead, NY
January 30, 2026; 7:00 pm, FloCollege/MASN		Campbell	L 54–63	10–9 (3–5)	Kaplan Arena (1,265); Williamsburg, VA
February 1, 2026; 2:00 pm, FloCollege/MASN		UNC Wilmington	W 79–68	11–9 (4–5)	Kaplan Arena (1,161); Williamsburg, VA
February 6, 2026; 7:00 pm, FloCollege		at Towson	W 52–51	12–9 (5–5)	SECU Arena (611); Towson, MD
February 8, 2026; 1:00 pm, FloCollege		at Elon	L 52–75	12–10 (5–6)	Schar Center (653); Elon, NC
February 15, 2026; 1:00 pm, FloCollege/MASN		Towson	W 75–70	13–10 (6–6)	Kaplan Arena (1,439); Williamsburg, VA
February 20, 2026; 7:00 pm, FloCollege/MASN		Monmouth	L 58–63	13–11 (6–7)	Kaplan Arena (1,067); Williamsburg, VA
February 22, 2026; 12:00 pm, FloCollege/MASN		Drexel	L 61–63	13–12 (6–8)	Kaplan Arena (1,012); Williamsburg, VA
February 27, 2026; 7:00 pm, FloCollege		at Charleston	L 48–70	13–13 (6–9)	TD Arena (747); Charleston, SC
March 1, 2026; 1:00 pm, FloCollege		at UNC Wilmington	W 60–41	14–13 (7–9)	Trask Coliseum (923); Wilmington, NC
March 5, 2026; 7:00 pm, FloCollege/MASN		Elon	W 70–59	15–13 (8–9)	Kaplan Arena (1,083); Williamsburg, VA
March 7, 2026; 2:00 pm, FloCollege		at Hampton	W 61–60	16–13 (9–9)	Hampton Convocation Center (292); Hampton, VA
CAA tournament
March 12, 2026; 12:00 pm, FloCollege	(8)	vs. (9) North Carolina A&T; Second Round	W 61–58	17–13	CareFirst Arena; Washington, D.C.
March 13, 2026; 12:00 pm, FloCollege	(8)	vs. (1) Charleston; Quarterfinals	L 55–58	17–14	CareFirst Arena; Washington, D.C.
*Non-conference game. ^{#}Rankings from AP Poll. (#) Tournament seedings in parentheses. All times are in Eastern.
