= 2025–26 Drexel Dragons women's basketball team =

American college basketball season

2025–26 Drexel Dragons women's basketball

WNIT, First Round
- Conference: Coastal Athletic Association
- Record: 21–11 (13–5 CAA)
- Head coach: Amy Mallon (6th season)
- Associate head coach: Stacy Weiss
- Assistant coaches: Kayla Bacon; Stephen Perretta; Mike Perretta
- Home arena: Daskalakis Athletic Center

2025–26 CAA women's basketball standings
	Conf.				Overall
Team	W		L	PCT	W		L	PCT
Charleston †	16	–	2	.889	27	–	6	.818
Campbell	13	–	5	.722	20	–	12	.625
Drexel	13	–	5	.722	21	–	11	.656
Stony Brook	12	–	6	.667	18	–	15	.545
Monmouth	12	–	6	.667	21	–	12	.636
Elon	10	–	8	.556	16	–	16	.500
Towson	10	–	8	.556	17	–	14	.548
William & Mary	9	–	9	.500	17	–	14	.548
North Carolina A&T	7	–	11	.389	12	–	18	.400
Hofstra	6	–	12	.333	11	–	22	.333
Hampton	4	–	14	.222	10	–	21	.323
Northeastern	3	–	15	.167	7	–	22	.241
UNC Wilmington	2	–	16	.111	7	–	24	.226
† 2026 CAA tournament winner

The 2025–26 Drexel Dragons women's basketball team represents Drexel University during the 2025–26 NCAA Division I women's basketball season. The Dragons, led by sixth-year head coach Amy Mallon, play their home games at the Daskalakis Athletic Center in Philadelphia, Pennsylvania as members of the Coastal Athletic Association.

== Previous season ==
The Dragons finished the 2024–25 season 17–13, 12–6 in CAA play, to finish in a tie for third place. They defeated Monmouth, before being upset by #9 seed and eventual tournament champions William & Mary in the semifinals of the CAA tournament.

== Preseason ==
On October 2, 2025, the Coastal Athletic Association released their preseason poll. Drexel was picked to finish second in the conference, with two first-place votes.

=== Preseason rankings ===
CAA Preseason Poll
Place	Team	Votes
1	Charleston	139 (8)
2	Drexel	125 (2)
3	North Carolina A&T	124 (3)
4	Campbell	112
5	Elon	87
6	William & Mary	83
7	Towson	79
8	Monmouth	71
9	Hofstra	67
10	UNC Wilmington	39
11	Hampton	37
12	Stony Brook	33
13	Northeastern	18
(#) first-place votes

=== Preseason All-CAA Teams ===
Preseason All-CAA Teams
Team	Name	Class	Position
First	Amaris Baker	Graduate Student	Guard

== Roster ==
2025–26 Drexel Dragons women's basketball team
Players
Coaches

Pos.	#	Name	Height	Year	Previous school	Hometown
G/F	2	Mariah Watkins	6 ft 0 in (1.83 m)	So	Webster Schroeder High School	Rochester, New York
G	3	Amaris Baker	5 ft 8 in (1.73 m)	GS	Harcum College	Philadelphia, Pennsylvania
F	4	Jalyn McNeill	5 ft 9 in (1.75 m)	Sr	Our Lady of Good Counsel High School	Damascus, Maryland
G	8	Julia Garcia Roig	5 ft 7 in (1.7 m)	Jr	Xavier	Barcelona, Spain
G	10	Laine McGurk	5 ft 10 in (1.78 m)	Jr	West Chester Rustin High School	West Chester, Pennsylvania
F	11	Deja Evans	6 ft 2 in (1.88 m)	Jr	Albany	Conshohocken, Pennsylvania
G	12	Grace O'Neill	5 ft 7 in (1.7 m)	Sr	Archbishop Carroll High School	West Chester, Pennsylvania
G	20	Molly Rullo	5 ft 11 in (1.8 m)	Fr	Cardinal O'Hara High School	Drexel Hill, Pennsylvania
G/F	23	Bria Watkins	6 ft 0 in (1.83 m)	Fr	Webster Schroeder High School	Rochester, New York
F	25	Iriona Gravley	6 ft 0 in (1.83 m)	So	Williamstown High School	Williamstown, New Jersey
G/F	33	Emilee Jones	5 ft 10 in (1.78 m)	So	Mansfield Timberview High School	Grand Prairie, Texas
F	55	Molly Lavin	6 ft 2 in (1.88 m)	Sr	American	London, England

Head coach

- Amy Mallon (Saint Joseph's)

Assistant coach(es)

- Stacy Weiss (Drexel)
- Kayla Bacon (Drexel)
- Stephen Perretta (Villanova)
- Mike Perretta (Villanova)

Legend

- (C) Team captain
- (S) Suspended
- (I) Ineligible
- (W) Walk-on
- Injured
- Current redshirt

Roster
Last update: March 10, 2026

== Schedule and results ==
Date time, TV	Rank^{#}	Opponent^{#}	Result	Record	High points	High rebounds	High assists	Site (attendance) city, state
Non-conference regular season
November 4, 2025*; 6:00 pm, ACCNX		at Pittsburgh	W 68–60	1–0	33 – McGurk	16 – Evans	5 – O'Neill	Petersen Events Center (638); Pittsburgh, PA
November 7, 2025*; 7:00 pm, ESPN+		at Marist	W 71–61	2–0	27 – Baker	10 – Evans	2 – Tied	McCann Arena (731); Poughkeepsie, NY
November 12, 2025*; 6:00 pm, NBCSP/FloCollege		Penn; Big 5 Classic Pod 1	W 72–55	3–0	18 – Baker	10 – Lavin	6 – O'Neill	Daskalakis Athletic Center (808); Philadelphia, PA
November 16, 2025*; 2:00 pm, NBCSP/FloCollege		Loyola (MD)	W 66–57	4–0	20 – Baker	6 – O'Neill	8 – O'Neill	Daskalakis Athletic Center (553); Philadelphia, PA
November 19, 2025*; 6:00 pm, ESPN+		at Lehigh	L 57−71	4−1	21 – Baker	10 – O'Neill	6 – O'Neill	Stabler Arena (412); Bethlehem, PA
November 22, 2025*; 1:00 pm, ESPN+		at NJIT	L 66−73	4−2	35 – Baker	11 – Baker	4 – O'Neill	Wellness and Events Center (232); Newark, NJ
November 29, 2025*; 2:00 pm, NBCSP		at Saint Joseph's; Big 5 Classic Pod 1	L 55–57	4–3	22 – Baker	7 – Tied	4 – O'Neill	Hagan Arena (1,009); Philadelphia, PA
December 3, 2025*; 6:00 pm, NBCSP/FloCollege		American	W 55–48	5–3	20 – Baker	9 – Lavin	4 – Garcia Roig	Daskalakis Athletic Center (479); Philadelphia, PA
December 7, 2025*; 2:15 pm, NBCSP		vs. Temple; Big 5 Classic 3rd Place Game	W 59–52	6–3	22 – Rullo	7 – Evans	6 – McGurk	Finneran Pavilion; Villanova, PA
December 16, 2025*; 3:30 pm, FloCollege		Chestnut Hill	W 95–38	7–3	26 – Baker	14 – M. Watkins	6 – Tied	Daskalakis Athletic Center (237); Philadelphia, PA
December 20, 2025*; 12:00 pm, NBCSP/FloCollege		Vermont	L 59–69	7–4	33 – Baker	8 – O'Neill	7 – McGurk	Daskalakis Athletic Center (340); Philadelphia, PA
CAA regular season
January 4, 2026; 2:00 pm, FloCollege		Campbell	L 51−62	7−5 (0–1)	22 – Baker	7 – Evans	4 – Rullo	Daskalakis Athletic Center (404); Philadelphia, PA
January 9, 2026; 6:30 pm, FloCollege		at Stony Brook	L 53–57	7–6 (0–2)	20 – Evans	8 – Evans	5 – O'Neill	Stony Brook Arena (552); Stony Brook, NY
January 11, 2026; 2:00 pm, FloCollege		Hofstra	W 67–38	8–6 (1–2)	20 – Evans	7 – Evans	6 – O'Neill	Daskalakis Athletic Center (519); Philadelphia, PA
January 16, 2026; 7:00 pm, FloCollege		at Charleston	L 64–74	8–7 (1–3)	17 – Baker	12 – Evans	4 – Rullo	TD Arena (437); Charleston, SC
January 18, 2026; 1:00 pm, FloCollege		at UNC Wilmington	W 76–67	9–7 (2–3)	24 – Baker	9 – O'Neill	5 – O'Neill	Trask Coliseum (912); Wilmington, NC
January 23, 2026; 6:00 pm, NBCSP/FloCollege		Stony Brook	W 49–41	10–7 (3–3)	13 – Evans	9 – Evans	4 – Rullo	Daskalakis Athletic Center (703); Philadelphia, PA
January 24, 2026; 6:00 pm, FloCollege		Towson	W 68–45	11–7 (4–3)	16 – Rullo	9 – McGurk	3 – Tied	Daskalakis Athletic Center (366); Philadelphia, PA
January 30, 2026; 7:00 pm, FloCollege		at Monmouth	W 56–53	12–7 (5–3)	18 – Baker	6 – Evans	3 – O'Neill	OceanFirst Bank Center (569); West Long Branch, NJ
February 1, 2026; 1:00 pm, FloCollege		at Northeastern	W 65–56	13–7 (6–3)	24 – McGurk	8 – Evans	7 – Garcia Roig	Cabot Center (281); Boston, MA
February 6, 2026; 6:00 pm, FloCollege		Hampton	W 75–42	14–7 (7–3)	24 – Baker	11 – Evans	5 – O'Neill	Daskalakis Athletic Center (697); Philadelphia, PA
February 8, 2026; 1:00 pm, FloCollege		Monmouth	L 60–62 ^{2OT}	14–8 (7–4)	25 – McGurk	9 – Evans	4 – Tied	Daskalakis Athletic Center (509); Philadelphia, PA
February 13, 2026; 6:00 pm, NBCSP/FloCollege		Elon	W 68–59	15–8 (8–4)	27 – Baker	7 – Evans	4 – Tied	Daskalakis Athletic Center (335); Philadelphia, PA
February 20, 2026; 7:00 pm, FloCollege		at Hampton	W 50–47	16–8 (9–4)	15 – McGurk	8 – Baker	3 – M. Watkins	Hampton Convocation Center (517); Hampton, VA
February 22, 2026; 12:00 pm, FloCollege		at William & Mary	W 63–61	17–8 (10–4)	16 – Tied	7 – Tied	5 – Garcia Roig	Kaplan Arena (1,012); Williamsburg, VA
February 27, 2026; 6:00 pm, NBCSP/FloCollege		Northeastern	W 72–61	18–8 (11–4)	26 – McGurk	8 – M. Watkins	6 – O'Neill	Daskalakis Athletic Center (776); Philadelphia, PA
March 1, 2026; 2:00 pm, FloCollege		North Carolina A&T	W 65–63	19–8 (12–4)	25 – Baker	8 – Evans	4 – O'Neill	Daskalakis Athletic Center (843); Philadelphia, PA
March 5, 2026; 6:00 pm, FloCollege		at Hofstra	W 70–56	20–8 (13–4)	15 – McGurk	7 – Rullo	9 – O'Neill	Mack Sports Complex (399); Hempstead, NY
March 7, 2026; 2:00 pm, FloCollege		at Towson	L 58–74	20–9 (13–5)	25 – Baker	5 – Tied	6 – Garcia Roig	SECU Arena (576); Towson, MD
CAA tournament
March 13, 2026; 8:30 pm, FloCollege	(3)	vs. (6) Elon; Quarterfinals	W 68–53	21–9	16 – Baker	7 – Watkins	4 – Tied	CareFirst Arena (1,400); Washington, D.C.
March 14, 2026; 4:30 pm, FloCollege	(3)	vs. (10) Hofstra; Semifinals	L 49–53 ^{OT}	21–10	19 – Baker	11 – Evans	3 – Tied	CareFirst Arena (1,450); Washington, D.C.
WNIT
March 19, 2026*; 6:00 pm, ESPN+		at St. Bonaventure; First round	L 67–69	21–11	19 – McGurk	7 – Tied	10 – Garcia Roig	Reilly Center (852); St. Bonaventure, NY
*Non-conference game. ^{#}Rankings from AP Poll. (#) Tournament seedings in parentheses. All times are in Eastern.

== See also ==
- 2025–26 Drexel Dragons men's basketball team
