= 2025–26 UNC Wilmington Seahawks women's basketball team =

American college basketball season

2025–26 UNC Wilmington Seahawks women's basketball
- Conference: Coastal Athletic Association
- Record: 7–24 (2–16 CAA)
- Head coach: Nicole Woods (3rd season)
- Associate head coach: Cherie Lea
- Assistant coaches: Brittany Drew; Kevin Harris; Madison Taylor
- Home arena: Trask Coliseum

2025–26 CAA women's basketball standings
| | Conf. | | | | Overall |
| Team | W | | L | PCT | W | | L | PCT |
|---|---|---|---|---|---|---|---|---|
| Charleston † | 16 | – | 2 | .889 | 27 | – | 6 | .818 |
| Campbell | 13 | – | 5 | .722 | 20 | – | 12 | .625 |
| Drexel | 13 | – | 5 | .722 | 21 | – | 11 | .656 |
| Stony Brook | 12 | – | 6 | .667 | 18 | – | 15 | .545 |
| Monmouth | 12 | – | 6 | .667 | 21 | – | 12 | .636 |
| Elon | 10 | – | 8 | .556 | 16 | – | 16 | .500 |
| Towson | 10 | – | 8 | .556 | 17 | – | 14 | .548 |
| William & Mary | 9 | – | 9 | .500 | 17 | – | 14 | .548 |
| North Carolina A&T | 7 | – | 11 | .389 | 12 | – | 18 | .400 |
| Hofstra | 6 | – | 12 | .333 | 11 | – | 22 | .333 |
| Hampton | 4 | – | 14 | .222 | 10 | – | 21 | .323 |
| Northeastern | 3 | – | 15 | .167 | 7 | – | 22 | .241 |
| UNC Wilmington | 2 | – | 16 | .111 | 7 | – | 24 | .226 |
† 2026 CAA tournament winner

The 2025–26 UNC Wilmington Seahawks women's basketball team represented the University of North Carolina Wilmington during the 2025–26 NCAA Division I women's basketball season. The Seahawks, led by third-year head coach Nicole Woods, played their home games at Trask Coliseum in Wilmington, North Carolina as members of the Coastal Athletic Association.

== Previous season ==
The Seahawks finished the 2024–25 season 14–18, 8–10 in CAA play, to finish in three-way tie for ninth place. They were defeated by Delaware in the second round of the CAA tournament.

== Preseason ==
On October 2, 2025, the Coastal Athletic Association released their preseason poll. UNC Wilmington was picked to finish tenth in the conference.

=== Preseason rankings ===
CAA Preseason Poll
| Place | Team | Votes |
|---|---|---|
| 1 | Charleston | 139 (8) |
| 2 | Drexel | 125 (2) |
| 3 | North Carolina A&T | 124 (3) |
| 4 | Campbell | 112 |
| 5 | Elon | 87 |
| 6 | William & Mary | 83 |
| 7 | Towson | 79 |
| 8 | Monmouth | 71 |
| 9 | Hofstra | 67 |
| 10 | UNC Wilmington | 39 |
| 11 | Hampton | 37 |
| 12 | Stony Brook | 33 |
| 13 | Northeastern | 18 |
(#) first-place votes

=== Preseason All-CAA Teams ===
No players were named to the All-CAA Preseason First or Second Teams.

== Roster ==
2025–26 UNC Wilmington Seahawks women's basketball team
Players
Coaches

| Pos. | # | Name | Height | Year | Previous school | Hometown |
|---|---|---|---|---|---|---|
| G | 0 | Ebbony Wilson | 5 ft 10 in (1.78 m) | Fr | St. Mary's Academy | Los Angeles, California |
| G | 1 | Mary Ferrito | 5 ft 10 in (1.78 m) | Sr | Wisconsin | Plain City, Ohio |
| G | 2 | Paige Smith | 5 ft 7 in (1.7 m) | Jr | CCBC Essex | Hagerstown, Maryland |
| G | 3 | Kate Hollifield | 5 ft 10 in (1.78 m) | Sr | Belmont | Shelby, North Carolina |
| G | 4 | Tia Dobson | 5 ft 7 in (1.7 m) | So | Mainland High School | Daytona Beach, Florida |
| G | 5 | Rori Cox | 5 ft 7 in (1.7 m) | GS | Virginia Union | Brooklyn, New York |
| G | 10 | McCall King | 5 ft 10 in (1.78 m) | Sr | Christ Church Episcopal School | Easley, South Carolina |
| F | 11 | Torin Rogers | 6 ft 1 in (1.85 m) | RS Jr | Richmond | Brasstown, North Carolina |
| F | 13 | Corrie McLaughlin | 6 ft 2 in (1.88 m) | Jr | Millbrook High School | Raleigh, North Carolina |
| G | 21 | Kylah Silver | 5 ft 10 in (1.78 m) | RS So | D. H. Conley High School | Greenville, North Carolina |
| F | 23 | Icyss Storm | 6 ft 1 in (1.85 m) | Fr | Grace Christian School | Durham, North Carolina |
| C | 24 | Angelina Pelayo | 6 ft 3 in (1.91 m) | RS Fr | Sacred Heart Academy | Louisville, Kentucky |
| G | 33 | Staci Williams | 5 ft 8 in (1.73 m) | Jr | Fairleigh Dickinson | Holly Springs, North Carolina |

Head coach

- Nicole Woods (Belmont Abbey)

Assistant coach(es)

- Cherie Lea (UNC Wilmington)
- Brittany Drew (Guilford)
- Kevin Harris (Bryant & Stratton)
- Brittany Drew (College of Charleston)

Legend

- (C) Team captain
- (S) Suspended
- (I) Ineligible
- (W) Walk-on
- Injured
- Current redshirt

Roster
Last update: June 7, 2026

== Schedule and results ==
| Date time, TV | Rank^{#} | Opponent^{#} | Result | Record | Site (attendance) city, state |
Non-conference regular season
| November 3, 2025*; 6:00 pm, ESPN+ | | at East Carolina | L 63–82 | 0–1 | Williams Arena (1,010); Greenville, NC |
| November 7, 2025*; 6:30 pm | | at North Carolina Central | W 78–68 | 1–1 | McDougald–McLendon Arena (682); Durham, NC |
| November 12, 2025*; 7:00 pm, FloCollege | | Coastal Carolina | L 56–80 | 1–2 | Trask Coliseum (770); Wilmington, NC |
| November 19, 2025*; 7:00 pm, ESPN+ | | at Gardner–Webb | L 56–65 | 1–3 | Paul Porter Arena (275); Boiling Springs, NC |
| November 21, 2025*; 11:00 am, FloCollege | | Presbyterian | W 75−55 | 2−3 | Trask Coliseum (2,893); Wilmington, NC |
| November 30, 2025*; 1:00 pm, FloCollege | | Queens | W 69−59 | 3−3 | Trask Coliseum (826); Wilmington, NC |
| December 3, 2025*; 11:00 am, ESPN+ | | at West Georgia | L 63–83 | 3–4 | The Coliseum (2,267); Carrollton, GA |
| December 7, 2025*; 1:00 pm, ESPN+ | | at Winthrop | L 68–78 | 3–5 | Winthrop Coliseum (293); Rock Hill, SC |
| December 17, 2025*; 8:00 pm, ACCN | | at No. 18 North Carolina | L 34–84 | 3–6 | Carmichael Arena (1,824); Chapel Hill, NC |
| December 21, 2025*; 2:00 pm, ESPN+ | | at Longwood | L 72–98 | 3–7 | Joan Perry Brock Center (812); Farmville, VA |
| December 29, 2025*; 7:00 pm, FloCollege | | Columbia International | W 76–37 | 4–7 | Trask Coliseum (776); Wilmington, NC |
CAA regular season
| January 2, 2026; 7:00 pm, FloCollege | | Northeastern | W 69−67 | 5−7 (1–0) | Trask Coliseum (824); Wilmington, NC |
| January 4, 2026; 1:00 pm, FloCollege | | Hofstra | L 46–54 | 5–8 (1–1) | Trask Coliseum (841); Wilmington, NC |
| January 9, 2026; 2:00 pm, FloCollege | | at Monmouth | L 50–52 | 5–9 (1–2) | OceanFirst Bank Center (337); West Long Branch, NJ |
| January 11, 2026; 1:00 pm, FloCollege | | at Towson | L 68–79 | 5–10 (1–3) | SECU Arena (522); Towson, MD |
| January 16, 2026; 7:00 pm, FloCollege | | Elon | L 62–72 | 5–11 (1–4) | Trask Coliseum (750); Wilmington, NC |
| January 18, 2026; 1:00 pm, FloCollege | | Drexel | L 67–76 | 5–12 (1–5) | Trask Coliseum (912); Wilmington, NC |
| January 23, 2026; 7:00 pm, FloCollege | | Charleston | L 37–71 | 5–13 (1–6) | Trask Coliseum (1,102); Wilmington, NC |
| January 27, 2026; 3:00 pm, FloCollege | | at Campbell | L 61–67 ^{OT} | 5–14 (1–7) | Gore Arena (749); Buies Creek, NC |
| January 30, 2026; 7:00 pm, FloCollege | | Hampton | L 48–60 | 5–15 (1–8) | Trask Coliseum (759); Wilmington, NC |
| February 1, 2026; 2:00 pm, FloCollege | | at William & Mary | L 68–79 | 5–16 (1–9) | Kaplan Arena (1,161); Williamsburg, VA |
| February 6, 2026; 7:00 pm, FloCollege | | at Charleston | L 61–81 | 5–17 (1–10) | TD Arena (567); Charleston, SC |
| February 13, 2026; 7:00 pm, FloCollege | | North Carolina A&T | W 69–64 | 6–17 (2–10) | Trask Coliseum (771); Wilmington, NC |
| February 15, 2026; 1:00 pm, FloCollege | | Campbell | L 52–54 | 6–18 (2–11) | Trask Coliseum (790); Wilmington, NC |
| February 20, 2026; 6:31 pm, FloCollege | | at Stony Brook | L 55–60 | 6–19 (2–12) | Stony Brook Arena (844); Stony Brook, NY |
| February 22, 2026; 12:00 pm, FloCollege | | at Hofstra | L 43–75 | 6–20 (2–13) | Mack Sports Complex (493); Hempstead, NY |
| March 1, 2026; 1:00 pm, FloCollege | | William & Mary | L 41–60 | 6–21 (2–14) | Trask Coliseum (923); Wilmington, NC |
| March 5, 2026; 7:00 pm, FloCollege | | at North Carolina A&T | L 46–55 | 6–22 (2–15) | Corbett Sports Center (705); Greensboro, NC |
| March 7, 2026; 7:00 pm, FloCollege | | at Elon | L 54–66 | 6–23 (2–16) | Schar Center (808); Elon, NC |
CAA tournament
| March 11, 2026; 2:00 pm, FloCollege | (13) | vs. (12) Northeastern; First Round | W 51–50 | 7–23 | CareFirst Arena (1,100); Washington, D.C. |
| March 12, 2026; 2:30 pm, FloCollege | (13) | vs. (5) Monmouth; Second Round | L 61–72 | 7–24 | CareFirst Arena (1,550); Washington, D.C. |
*Non-conference game. ^{#}Rankings from AP Poll. (#) Tournament seedings in parentheses. All times are in Eastern.
