= 2025–26 Campbell Fighting Camels women's basketball team =

American college basketball season

2025–26 Campbell Fighting Camels women's basketball
- Conference: Coastal Athletic Association
- Record: 20–12 (13–5 CAA)
- Head coach: Ronny Fisher (10th season)
- Associate head coach: Megan Hall
- Assistant coaches: Shy Tuelle; Blair Estarfaa
- Home arena: Gore Arena

2025–26 CAA women's basketball standings
	Conf.				Overall
Team	W		L	PCT	W		L	PCT
Charleston †	16	–	2	.889	27	–	6	.818
Campbell	13	–	5	.722	20	–	12	.625
Drexel	13	–	5	.722	21	–	11	.656
Stony Brook	12	–	6	.667	18	–	15	.545
Monmouth	12	–	6	.667	21	–	12	.636
Elon	10	–	8	.556	16	–	16	.500
Towson	10	–	8	.556	17	–	14	.548
William & Mary	9	–	9	.500	17	–	14	.548
North Carolina A&T	7	–	11	.389	12	–	18	.400
Hofstra	6	–	12	.333	11	–	22	.333
Hampton	4	–	14	.222	10	–	21	.323
Northeastern	3	–	15	.167	7	–	22	.241
UNC Wilmington	2	–	16	.111	7	–	24	.226
† 2026 CAA tournament winner

The 2025–26 Campbell Fighting Camels women's basketball team represented Campbell University during the 2025–26 NCAA Division I women's basketball season. The Fighting Camels, led by tenth-year head coach Ronny Fisher, played their home games at Gore Arena in Buies Creek, North Carolina as members of the Coastal Athletic Association.

== Previous season ==
The Fighting Camels finished the 2024–25 season 22–13, 12–6 in CAA play, to finish in a tie for third place. They defeated Towson and Charleston, before being upset by William & Mary in the CAA tournament championship game. They received an at-large bid to the WNIT, where they defeated Coastal Carolina in the first round, before falling to Southern Indiana in the second round.

== Preseason ==
On October 2, 2025, the Coastal Athletic Association released their preseason poll. Campbell was picked to finish fourth in the conference.

=== Preseason rankings ===
CAA Preseason Poll
Place	Team	Votes
1	Charleston	139 (8)
2	Drexel	125 (2)
3	North Carolina A&T	124 (3)
4	Campbell	112
5	Elon	87
6	William & Mary	83
7	Towson	79
8	Monmouth	71
9	Hofstra	67
10	UNC Wilmington	39
11	Hampton	37
12	Stony Brook	33
13	Northeastern	18
(#) first-place votes

=== Preseason All-CAA teams ===
Preseason All-CAA teams
Team	Name	Class	Position
First	Gianni Boone	Senior	Guard

== Roster ==
2025–26 Campbell Fighting Camels women's basketball team
Players
Coaches

Pos.	#	Name	Height	Year	Previous school	Hometown
G	0	Jessica Woods	5 ft 7 in (1.7 m)	Jr	Westwood High School	Columbia, South Carolina
G	1	Ashleigh Battle	5 ft 2 in (1.57 m)	Jr	Eastern Florida State College	Fort Lauderdale, Florida
G	2	Keaton Rikard	5 ft 7 in (1.7 m)	Fr	North Raleigh Christian Academy	Raleigh, North Carolina
F	5	Mikayla Taborn	6 ft 3 in (1.91 m)	So	Franklinton High School	Youngsville, North Carolina
G	9	Emerson Thompson	5 ft 10 in (1.78 m)	So	Falls Lake Academy	Butner, North Carolina
F	10	N'na Konate	6 ft 3 in (1.91 m)	Fr	Winston-Salem Christian School	Lausanne, Switzerland
G	11	Olivia Tucker	5 ft 7 in (1.7 m)	So	Panther Creek High School	Durham, North Carolina
G	12	Hadleigh Dill	6 ft 0 in (1.83 m)	Jr	Enka High School	Candler, North Carolina
G	20	Jasmine Nivar	5 ft 10 in (1.78 m)	Fr	Apex Friendship High School	Apex, North Carolina
G	21	Logan Nuckols	5 ft 6 in (1.68 m)	Sr	Patrick Henry High School	Rockville, Virginia
G	22	Gianni Boone	5 ft 11 in (1.8 m)	Sr	St. John's College High School	Washington, D.C.
G	23	Jasmine Felton	5 ft 11 in (1.8 m)	So	Northeastern High School	Elizabeth City, North Carolina
F	24	Peris Smith	6 ft 2 in (1.88 m)	Jr	North Augusta High School	Graniteville, South Carolina
G	32	Ciara Alexander	6 ft 0 in (1.83 m)	So	Mount Paran Christian School	Atlanta, Georgia

Head coach

- Ronny Fisher (Furman)

Assistant coach(es)

- Megan Hall (Carson–Newman)
- Shy Tuelle (Campbell)
- Blair Estarfaa (SUNY Cortland)

Legend

- (C) Team captain
- (S) Suspended
- (I) Ineligible
- (W) Walk-on
- Injured
- Current redshirt

Roster
Last update: March 10, 2026

== Schedule and results ==
Date time, TV	Rank^{#}	Opponent^{#}	Result	Record	Site (attendance) city, state
Non-conference regular season
November 3, 2025*; 5:00 pm, ESPN+		at Tulane	L 72–74	0–1	Devlin Fieldhouse (1,181); New Orleans, LA
November 6, 2025*; 6:30 pm, ESPN+		at Charlotte	L 50–61	0–2	Halton Arena; Charlotte, NC
November 9, 2025*; 3:00 pm, FloCollege		Virginia–Lynchburg	W 88–23	1–2	Gore Arena (1,072); Buies Creek, NC
November 12, 2025*; 7:00 pm, FloCollege		Western Carolina	W 66–54	2–2	Gore Arena (723); Buies Creek, NC
November 16, 2025*; 7:00 pm, ESPN+		at Furman	W 68−61	3−2	Timmons Arena (397); Greenville, SC
November 21, 2025*; 4:00 pm		vs. Northern Colorado; WellNow Blue Demon Classic	L 62−68 ^{OT}	3−3	Wintrust Arena; Chicago, IL
November 22, 2025*; 4:00 pm		vs. Grambling State; WellNow Blue Demon Classic	W 67–51	4–3	Wintrust Arena; Chicago, IL
November 28, 2025*; 11:00 am		vs. North Dakota State; Osprey Thanksgiving Classic	L 49–71	4–4	UNF Arena (50); Jacksonville, FL
November 29, 2025*; 1:30 pm, ESPN+		at North Florida; Osprey Thanksgiving Classic	L 53–56	4–5	UNF Arena (636); Jacksonville, FL
December 3, 2025*; 7:00 pm, FloCollege		Mercer	W 71–49	5–5	Gore Arena (827); Buies Creek, NC
December 11, 2025*; 11:30 am, FloCollege		Carolina	W 100–43	6–5	Gore Arena (3,095); Buies Creek, NC
December 15, 2025*; 7:00 pm, FloCollege		Norfolk State	W 68−63	7−5	Gore Arena (324); Buies Creek, NC
December 21, 2025*; 1:00 pm, ESPN+		at East Carolina	L 59–81	7–6	Williams Arena (710); Greenville, NC
CAA regular season
January 2, 2026; 4:00 pm, FloCollege		at Towson	L 54–57	7–7 (0–1)	SECU Arena (502); Towson, MD
January 4, 2026; 2:00 pm, FloCollege		at Drexel	W 62–51	8–7 (1–1)	Daskalakis Athletic Center (404); Philadelphia, PA
January 9, 2026; 7:00 pm, FloCollege		Elon	W 62–52	9–7 (2–1)	Gore Arena (775); Buies Creek, NC
January 11, 2026; 2:00 pm, FloCollege		William & Mary	W 45–43	10–7 (3–1)	Gore Arena (873); Buies Creek, NC
January 16, 2026; 7:00 pm, FloCollege		at Northeastern	W 61–51	11–7 (4–1)	Cabot Center (167); Boston, MA
January 18, 2026; 2:00 pm, FloCollege		at Monmouth	L 31–72	11–8 (4–2)	OceanFirst Bank Center (718); West Long Branch, NJ
January 23, 2026; 7:00 pm, FloCollege		at Hampton	W 58–43	12–8 (5–2)	Hampton Convocation Center (578); Hampton, VA
January 27, 2026; 3:00 pm, FloCollege		UNC Wilmington	W 67–61 ^{OT}	13–8 (6–2)	Gore Arena (749); Buies Creek, NC
January 30, 2026; 7:00 pm, FloCollege		at William & Mary	W 63–54	14–8 (7–2)	Kaplan Arena (1,265); Williamsburg, VA
February 3, 2026; 5:00 pm, FloCollege		Charleston	L 49–61	14–9 (7–3)	Gore Arena (927); Buies Creek, NC
February 8, 2026; 2:00 pm, FloCollege		North Carolina A&T	W 54–46	15–9 (8–3)	Gore Arena (989); Buies Creek, NC
February 13, 2026; 7:00 pm, FloCollege		Hofstra	W 58–47	16–9 (9–3)	Gore Arena (1,072); Buies Creek, NC
February 15, 2026; 1:00 pm, FloCollege		at UNC Wilmington	W 54–52	17–9 (10–3)	Trask Coliseum (790); Wilmington, NC
February 20, 2026; 7:00 pm, FloCollege		at Elon	L 54–68	17–10 (10–4)	Schar Center (808); Elon, NC
February 27, 2026; 5:00 pm, FloCollege		Towson	L 55–63	17–11 (10–5)	Gore Arena (982); Buies Creek, NC
March 1, 2026; 1:00 pm, FloCollege		at Charleston	W 59–57	18–11 (11–5)	TD Arena (526); Charleston, SC
March 5, 2026; 7:00 pm, FloCollege		Hampton	W 69–51	19–11 (12–5)	Gore Arena (907); Buies Creek, NC
March 7, 2026; 2:00 pm, FloCollege		Stony Brook	W 55–41	20–11 (13–5)	Gore Arena (1,063); Buies Creek, NC
CAA tournament
March 13, 2026; 6:00 pm, FloCollege	(2)	vs. (10) Hofstra; Quarterfinals	L 50–55	20–12	CareFirst Arena; Washington, D.C.
*Non-conference game. ^{#}Rankings from AP Poll. (#) Tournament seedings in parentheses. All times are in Eastern.
