= 2025–26 North Carolina A&T Aggies women's basketball team =

American college basketball season

2025–26 North Carolina A&T Aggies women's basketball
- Conference: Coastal Athletic Association
- Record: 12–18 (7–11 CAA)
- Head coach: Tarrell Robinson (14th season)
- Associate head coach: Shavon Earp
- Assistant coaches: Kelly Mathis; Chris Dunn
- Home arena: Corbett Sports Center

2025–26 CAA women's basketball standings
	Conf.				Overall
Team	W		L	PCT	W		L	PCT
Charleston †	16	–	2	.889	27	–	6	.818
Campbell	13	–	5	.722	20	–	12	.625
Drexel	13	–	5	.722	21	–	11	.656
Stony Brook	12	–	6	.667	18	–	15	.545
Monmouth	12	–	6	.667	21	–	12	.636
Elon	10	–	8	.556	16	–	16	.500
Towson	10	–	8	.556	17	–	14	.548
William & Mary	9	–	9	.500	17	–	14	.548
North Carolina A&T	7	–	11	.389	12	–	18	.400
Hofstra	6	–	12	.333	11	–	22	.333
Hampton	4	–	14	.222	10	–	21	.323
Northeastern	3	–	15	.167	7	–	22	.241
UNC Wilmington	2	–	16	.111	7	–	24	.226
† 2026 CAA tournament winner

The 2025–26 North Carolina A&T Aggies women's basketball team represented North Carolina A&T State University during the 2025–26 NCAA Division I women's basketball season. The Aggies, led by 14th-year head coach Tarrell Robinson, played their home games at the Corbett Sports Center in Greensboro, North Carolina as members of the Coastal Athletic Association.

== Previous season ==
The Aggies finished the 2024–25 season 19–12, 15–3 in CAA play, to finish as CAA regular season champions. They were upset by #9 seed and eventual tournament champions William & Mary in the quarterfinals of the CAA tournament. They received an automatic bid to the WBIT, where they would be defeated by Virginia Tech in the first round.

== Preseason ==
On October 2, 2025, the Coastal Athletic Association released their preseason poll. North Carolina A&T was picked to finish third in the conference, with three first-place votes.

=== Preseason rankings ===
CAA Preseason Poll
Place	Team	Votes
1	Charleston	139 (8)
2	Drexel	125 (2)
3	North Carolina A&T	124 (3)
4	Campbell	112
5	Elon	87
6	William & Mary	83
7	Towson	79
8	Monmouth	71
9	Hofstra	67
10	UNC Wilmington	39
11	Hampton	37
12	Stony Brook	33
13	Northeastern	18
(#) first-place votes

=== Preseason All-CAA Teams ===
Preseason All-CAA Teams
Team	Name	Class	Position
First	Chaniya Clark	(redshirt) Senior	Center
Second	Paris Locke	Junior	Forward
Honorable Mention - D'Mya Tucker

== Roster ==
2025–26 North Carolina A&T Aggies women's basketball team
Players
Coaches

Pos.	#	Name	Height	Year	Previous school	Hometown
F	0	Darrionna Howard	5 ft 11 in (1.8 m)	Jr	Delaware	Smithfield, North Carolina
G	2	Londyn Walker	5 ft 8 in (1.73 m)	Fr	Milton High School	Atlanta, Georgia
G	3	Crystal Hardy	5 ft 8 in (1.73 m)	Fr	Emmanuel Christian Academy	Cheltenham, Maryland
F	4	Anaya Karriem	6 ft 2 in (1.88 m)	Fr	West Orange High School	West Orange, New Jersey
F	5	Rachel Griffin	6 ft 3 in (1.91 m)	So	Rossville Academy	Oakland, Tennessee
G	10	D'Mya Tucker	5 ft 11 in (1.8 m)	GS	Orangeburg-Wilkinson High School	Orangeburg, South Carolina
G	12	Ja'naya Meyers	5 ft 9 in (1.75 m)	Fr	Bayonne High School	Jersey City, New Jersey
F	15	Elliott Jessup	6 ft 0 in (1.83 m)	So	RJ Reynolds High School	Winston-Salem, North Carolina
F	21	Shimei Muhammad	6 ft 0 in (1.83 m)	GS	Charleston Southern	Brooklyn, New York
G	23	Jamyia Lindsey	5 ft 6 in (1.68 m)	Fr	Richmond Senior High School	Rockingham, North Carolina
F	25	Paris Locke	6 ft 0 in (1.83 m)	Jr	McDonogh School	Baltimore, Maryland
C	33	Chaniya Clark	6 ft 4 in (1.93 m)	RS Sr	Fort Myers High School	Fort Myers, Florida

Head coach

- Tarrell Robinson (North Carolina A&T)

Assistant coach(es)

- Shavon Earp (Radford)
- Kelly Mathis (Pfeiffer)
- Chris Dunn (West Virginia State)

Legend

- (C) Team captain
- (S) Suspended
- (I) Ineligible
- (W) Walk-on
- Injured
- Current redshirt

Roster
Last update: May 23, 2026

== Schedule and results ==
Date time, TV	Rank^{#}	Opponent^{#}	Result	Record	Site (attendance) city, state
Non-conference regular season
November 3, 2025*; 7:00 pm, ESPN+		at Texas Tech	L 40–78	0–1	United Supermarkets Arena (2,978); Lubbock, TX
November 6, 2025*; 5:00 pm, ESPN+		at No. 17 TCU	L 43–82	0–2	Schollmaier Arena (2,187); Fort Worth, TX
November 9, 2025*; 3:00 pm, MWN		at New Mexico	L 64–71	0–3	The Pit (4,068); Albuquerque, NM
November 12, 2025*; 7:00 pm, FloCollege		Shaw	W 77–28	1–3	Corbett Sports Center (1,358); Greensboro, NC
November 16, 2025*; 2:00 pm, FloCollege		Winston-Salem State	W 74−43	2−3	Corbett Sports Center (1,240); Greensboro, NC
November 20, 2025*; 7:00 pm, FloCollege		No. 14 North Carolina	L 50−85	2−4	Corbett Sports Center; Greensboro, NC
December 2, 2025*; 6:30 pm, ESPN+		at North Carolina Central	W 73–67	3–4	McDougald–McLendon Arena (1,641); Durham, NC
December 6, 2025*; 12:00 pm, FloCollege		Norfolk State	L 50–63	3–5	Corbett Sports Center (1,074); Greensboro, NC
December 15, 2025*; 11:00 am, SECN		at Georgia	L 49–77	3–6	Stegeman Coliseum (5,425); Athens, GA
December 20, 2025*; 2:00 pm, FloCollege		Ferrum	W 84–39	4–6	Corbett Sports Center (551); Greensboro, NC
December 30, 2025*; 5:00 pm, FloCollege		Newberry	W 99–49	5–6	Corbett Sports Center (904); Greensboro, NC
CAA regular season
January 2, 2026; 7:00 pm, FloCollege		William & Mary	L 49−60	5−7 (0–1)	Corbett Sports Center (654); Greensboro, NC
January 4, 2026; 1:00 pm, FloCollege		Monmouth	L 55–61	5–8 (0–2)	Corbett Sports Center (416); Greensboro, NC
January 9, 2026; 7:00 pm, FloCollege		at Northeastern	W 84–83 ^{2OT}	6–8 (1–2)	Cabot Center (210); Boston, MA
January 11, 2026; 1:00 pm, FloCollege		at Stony Brook	L 51–56	6–9 (1–3)	Stony Brook Arena (454); Stony Brook, NY
January 18, 2026; 2:00 pm, FloCollege		Hampton	W 70–57	7–9 (2–3)	Corbett Sports Center (1,304); Greensboro, NC
January 23, 2026; 7:00 pm, FloCollege		at Elon	L 60–67	7–10 (2–4)	Schar Center (817); Elon, NC
January 25, 2026; 1:00 pm, FloCollege		at Charleston	L 62–71	7–11 (2–5)	TD Arena (620); Charleston, SC
January 30, 2026; 5:00 pm, FloCollege		Towson	L 57–59	7–12 (2–6)	Corbett Sports Center (456); Greensboro, NC
February 1, 2026; 7:00 pm, FloCollege		at Hampton	W 62–57	8–12 (3–6)	Hampton Convocation Center (427); Hampton, VA
February 6, 2026; 7:00 pm, FloCollege		Elon	W 67–61	9–12 (4–6)	Corbett Sports Center (1,014); Greensboro, NC
February 8, 2026; 2:00 pm, FloCollege		at Campbell	L 46–54	9–13 (4–7)	Gore Arena (989); Buies Creek, NC
February 13, 2026; 7:00 pm, FloCollege		at UNC Wilmington	L 64–69	9–14 (4–8)	Trask Coliseum (771); Wilmington, NC
February 15, 2026; 1:00 pm, FloCollege		Hofstra	L 51–60	9–15 (4–9)	Corbett Sports Center (625); Greensboro, NC
February 20, 2026; 7:00 pm, FloCollege		Northeastern	W 89–86 ^{3OT}	10–15 (5–9)	Corbett Sports Center (1,044); Greensboro, NC
February 27, 2026; 7:00 pm, FloCollege		at Monmouth	W 71–65	11–15 (6–9)	OceanFirst Bank Center (850); West Long Branch, NJ
March 1, 2026; 2:00 pm, FloCollege		at Drexel	L 63–65 ^{OT}	11–16 (6–10)	Daskalakis Athletic Center (843); Philadelphia, PA
March 5, 2026; 7:00 pm, FloCollege		UNC Wilmington	W 55–46	12–16 (7–10)	Corbett Sports Center (705); Greensboro, NC
March 7, 2026; 2:00 pm, FloCollege		Charleston	L 64–70	12–17 (7–11)	Corbett Sports Center (693); Greensboro, NC
CAA tournament
March 12, 2026; 12:00 pm, FloCollege	(9)	vs. (8) William & Mary; Second Round	L 58–61	12–18	CareFirst Arena; Washington, D.C.
*Non-conference game. ^{#}Rankings from AP Poll. (#) Tournament seedings in parentheses. All times are in Eastern.
