= Erin Dickerson Davis =

American basketball player and coach

Current position
- Title: Head coach
- Team: William & Mary
- Conference: CAA
- Record: 66–60 (.524)

Biographical details
- Education: Northwestern; Georgetown

Playing career
- 2005–2009: Northwestern
- Position: Guard

Coaching career (HC unless noted)
- 2009–2010: Furman (assistant)
- 2010–2013: La Salle (assistant)
- 2013–2015: Illinois State (assistant)
- 2015–2017: Towson (associate HC)
- 2017–2020: Georgetown (assistant)
- 2020–2021: Wake Forest (assistant)
- 2021–2022: Wake Forest (associate HC)
- 2022–present: William & Mary

Head coaching record
- Overall: 66–60 (.524)

Erin Dickerson Davis (née Dickerson) is an American basketball coach and former player who is the current head coach of the William & Mary Tribe women's basketball team.

== Early life and playing career ==
A native of Chicago, Illinois, Dickerson Davis attended Whitney M. Young Magnet High School where she was a four-time starter and three-time letterwinner on the basketball team.

== Coaching career ==
=== William & Mary ===
On April 12, 2022, Dickerson Davis was named the sixth NCAA Division I head coach in William & Mary Tribe women's basketball program history. On August 20, 2024, her contract was extended to the end of the 2028–29 season.

== Head coaching record ==
Record table
Season	Team	Overall	Conference	Standing	Postseason
William & Mary Tribe (Coastal Athletic Association) (2022–present)
2022–23	William & Mary	18–13	12–6	T–4th	
2023–24	William & Mary	15–14	11–6	5th	
2024–25	William & Mary	16–19	8–10	T–9th	NCAA First Round
2025–26	William & Mary	17–14	9–9	8th	
William & Mary:		66–60 (.524)	40–31 (.563)		
Total:		66–60 (.524)			
National champion Postseason invitational champion Conference regular season champion Conference regular season and conference tournament champion Division regular season champion Division regular season and conference tournament champion Conference tournament champion
