= Robin Harmony =

American college basketball coach (born 1961)

Current position
- Title: Head coach
- Team: Pittsburgh
- Conference: ACC
- Record: 0–0 (–)

Biographical details
- Born: October 20, 1961 (age 65); Hershey, Pennsylvania, U.S.

Playing career
- 1980–1984: Miami (FL)
- 1984–1985: Avon Cosmetics of Northampton, England
- Position: Guard

Coaching career (HC unless noted)
- 1985–1987: Miami (FL) (assistant)
- 1987–1988: Fairleigh Dickinson (assistant)
- 1988–1993: Miami (FL) (assistant)
- 1993–2005: Miami (FL) (assoc. HC)
- 2005–2013: St. Thomas (FL)
- 2013–2019: Lamar
- 2019–2026: Charleston
- 2026–present: Pittsburgh

Head coaching record
- Overall: Division I (NCAA) 369–198 (.651); NAIA 131–48(.732)

Accomplishments and honors

Championships
- CAA regular season (2026); CAA tournament (2026); 3x Southland Conference regular season (2014 (co champ), 2018, 2019); 3x Sun Conference regular season (2009, 2011, 2013); Sun Conference tournament (2010)

Awards
- CAA Coach of the Year (2026); Southland Conference Coach of the Year (2018); 2x Sun Conference Coach of the Year (2009, 2013); University of Miami Sports Hall of Fame (1997); Atlantic Coast Conference Women's Basketball Legend (2013)

Robin Harmony (born October 20, 1961) is an American college basketball coach. She currently serves as head coach of the Pitt women's basketball team. She previously was head coach at College of Charleston , Lamar, and St. Thomas University. Prior to that, she served as assistant coach (six years) and associate head coach (twelve years) at Miami Hurricanes. She split her stay at the University of Miami by serving as an assistant coach at Fairleigh Dickinson University for one season prior to her return to the Hurricanes.

== Playing career ==
Harmony was a three-year letter winner at Hershey High School located in Hershey, Pennsylvania. At the University of Miami, she earned a letter all four years playing for the Miami Hurricanes. At Miami, Harmony recorded total of 1,308 points, 750 rebounds, 415 assists and 314 steals in four seasons. As of April, 2013, she still held the Miami single-game record for assists with 14 and was 10th on Miami's all-time scoring chart and fifth in rebounding. After graduation, she continued playing basketball for the Avon Cosmetics women's team in Northampton, England. She was named Most Valuable Player for the team in her one season there. Harmony also had coaching duties with the team.

Harmony received several honors as a player. Inducted in the Class of 1997, she was the first women's basketball player to be inducted into the University of Miami's Sports Hall of Fame. In 2013, Harmony was named an Atlantic Coast Conference Women's Basketball Legend.

== Coaching career ==
=== University of Miami ===
Harmony spent 18 years on the staff of the University of Miami. She served as Assistant Coach for six years and Associate Head Coach for twelve years. While Coach Harmony was at Miami, the Hurricanes won three Big East regular season championships and two Big East conference tournament championships. The Hurricanes also participated in post season play seven time advancing to the sweet 16 one time.

=== St. Thomas University ===
Harmony became the first women's basketball coach of NAIA St. Thomas University in 2005. While at St. Thomas, her teams compiled an overall record of 131–48, won three regular season championships, and one Sun Conference tournament championship. Her teams participated in the NAIA National Tournament three times.

=== Lamar University ===
Harmony was named Lamar women's basketball head coach on April 30, 2013. The Lady Cardinals compiled an overall record of 18–13 and conference record of 13–5 in Coach Harmony's first year at Lamar. Her team was Southland Conference co-champion in the regular season. The Lady Cardinals participated in the WNIT, the fourth post season tournament for the Lady Cardinals in a five-year period. Her 2017–18 and 2018–19 teams won the Southland Conference regular season championship with a 17–1 record each season. The teams competed in the WNIT both years following losses in the Southland Conference women's basketball tournament.

On April 28, 2015, it was announced that Harmony had signed a three-year contract extension as Lamar's head coach.

Coach Harmony resigned her position on April 19, 2019 to become head women's basketball coach for the College of Charleston.

== Head coaching record ==
- Charleston
- CAA
- Lamar

Record table
Season	Team	Overall	Conference	Standing	Postseason
St. Thomas Bobcats (Sun Conference) (2005–2013)
2007–08	St. Thomas	17–10	6–6		
2008–09	St. Thomas	22–7	10–2	1st	
2009–10	St. Thomas	22–9	11–3	1st	NAIA DII Tournament first round
2010–11	St. Thomas	20–10	12–1	1st	
2011–12	St. Thomas	24–9	13–3		NAIA DII Tournament first round
2012–13	St. Thomas	27–4	14–0	1st	NAIA DII Tournament first round
St. Thomas:		132–49 (.729)	66–15 (.815)		
Lamar Lady Cardinals (Southland Conference) (2013–2019)
2013–14	Lamar	18–13	13–5	T–1st	WNIT first round
2014–15	Lamar	17–13	14–4	2nd	
2015–16	Lamar	12–19	7–11	T-8th	
2016–17	Lamar	22–8	15–3	3rd	WBI First round
2017–18	Lamar	22–8	17–1	1st	WNIT First round
2018–19	Lamar	24–7	17–1	1st	WNIT First round
Lamar:		115–68 (.628)	83–25 (.769)		
College of Charleston (Colonial Athletic Association) (2019–2026)
2019–20	Charleston	13–17	6–12	T–8th	
2020–21	Charleston	6–9	2–6	9th	
2021–22	Charleston	18–13	9–9	T–5th	
2022–23	Charleston	11–18	6–12	10th	
2023–24	Charleston	22–10	13–5	T–3rd	WNIT second round
2024–25	Charleston	25–8	14–4	2nd	WNIT Super 16
2025–26	Charleston	27–6	16–2	1st	NCAA Division I First Round
Charleston:		122–81 (.601)	66–50 (.569)		
Pittsburgh Panthers (Atlantic Coast Conference) (2026–present)
2026–27	Pittsburgh	0–0	0–0		
Pittsburgh:		0–0 (–)	0–0 (–)		
Total:		369–198 (.651)			
National champion Postseason invitational champion Conference regular season champion Conference regular season and conference tournament champion Division regular season champion Division regular season and conference tournament champion Conference tournament champion
