= 2026 CAA women's basketball tournament =

American college basketball postseason tournament

- Classification: Division I
- Season: 2025–26
- Teams: 13
- Site: CareFirst Arena; Washington, D.C.
- Champions: Charleston (1st title)
- Winning coach: Robin Harmony (1st title)
- MVP: Taryn Barbot (Charleston)
- Top scorer: Taryn Barbot (Charleston) (64 points)
- Television: FloHoops, CBSSN
- CAA women's basketball tournaments

2025–26 CAA women's basketball standings
	Conf.				Overall
Team	W		L	PCT	W		L	PCT
Charleston †	16	–	2	.889	27	–	6	.818
Campbell	13	–	5	.722	20	–	12	.625
Drexel	13	–	5	.722	21	–	11	.656
Stony Brook	12	–	6	.667	18	–	15	.545
Monmouth	12	–	6	.667	21	–	12	.636
Elon	10	–	8	.556	16	–	16	.500
Towson	10	–	8	.556	17	–	14	.548
William & Mary	9	–	9	.500	17	–	14	.548
North Carolina A&T	7	–	11	.389	12	–	18	.400
Hofstra	6	–	12	.333	11	–	22	.333
Hampton	4	–	14	.222	10	–	21	.323
Northeastern	3	–	15	.167	7	–	22	.241
UNC Wilmington	2	–	16	.111	7	–	24	.226
† 2026 CAA tournament winner

The 2026 Coastal Athletic Association women's basketball tournament was the postseason women's college basketball tournament for the Coastal Athletic Association for the 2025–26 NCAA Division I women's basketball season. The tournament was held March 11-15 2026, at CareFirst Arena in Washington, D.C. The winner will receive the conference's automatic bid to the 2026 NCAA tournament.

== Seeds ==
All 13 CAA participated in the tournament. Teams were seeded by their record within the conference games played, with a tiebreaker system to seed teams with identical conference records. The top 11 teams also received a first round bye while the top four teams received a double bye, automatically advancing them into the quarterfinals.

Seed	School	Conf.	Tiebreaker
1	Charleston	16–2	
2	Campbell	13–5	1–0 vs. Drexel
3	Drexel	13–5	0–1 vs. Campbell
4	Stony Brook	12–6	2–0 vs. Monmouth
5	Monmouth	12–6	0–2 vs. Stony Brook
6	Elon	10–8	1–0 vs. Towson
7	Towson	10–8	0–1 vs. Elon
8	William & Mary	9–9	
9	North Carolina A&T	7–11	
10	Hofstra	6–12	
11	Hampton	4–14	
12	Northeastern	3–15	
13	UNC Wilmington	2–16	

== Schedule ==
Session	Game	Time*	Matchup	Score	Television
First Round – Wednesday, March 11
1	1	2:00 p.m.	No. 12 Northeastern vs. No. 13 UNC Wilmington	50–51	FloHoops
Second Round – Thursday, March 12
2	2	12:00 p.m.	No. 8 William & Mary vs. No. 9 North Carolina A&T	61–58	FloHoops
2	3	2:30 p.m.	No. 5 Monmouth vs. No. 13 UNC Wilmington	72–61	FloHoops
3	4	6:00 p.m.	No. 7 Towson vs. No. 10 Hofstra	71–72	FloHoops
3	5	8:30 p.m.	No. 6 Elon vs. No. 11 Hampton	67–62	FloHoops
Quarterfinals – Friday, March 13
4	6	12:00 p.m.	No. 1 Charleston vs. No. 8 William & Mary	58–55	FloHoops
4	7	2:30 p.m.	No. 4 Stony Brook vs. No. 5 Monmouth	51–45	FloHoops
5	8	6:00 p.m.	No. 2 Campbell vs. No. 10 Hofstra	50–55	FloHoops
5	9	8:30 p.m.	No. 3 Drexel vs. No. 6 Elon	68–53	FloHoops
Semifinals – Saturday, March 14
6	10	2:00 p.m.	No. 1 Charleston vs. No. 4 Stony Brook	79–49	FloHoops
6	11	4:30 p.m.	No. 3 Drexel vs. No. 10 Hofstra	49–53^{OT}	FloHoops
Championship – Sunday, March 15
7	12	2:00 p.m.	No. 1 Charleston vs. No. 10 Hofstra	68–56	CBSSN
*Game times in ET. Rankings denote tournament seed

== Bracket ==
First round Wednesday, March 11
12	Northeastern	50
13	UNC Wilmington	51

Second round Thursday, March 12
8	William & Mary	61
9	North Carolina A&T	58
5	Monmouth	72
13	UNC Wilmington	61
7	Towson	71
10	Hofstra	72
6	Elon	67
11	Hampton	62

Quarterfinals; Friday, March 13
1	Charleston	58
8	William & Mary	55
4	Stony Brook	51
5	Monmouth	45
2	Campbell	50
10	Hofstra	55
3	Drexel	68
6	Elon	53

Semifinals; Saturday, March 14
1	Charleston	79
4	Stony Brook	59
10	Hofstra	53*
3	Drexel	49

Championship; Sunday, March 15
1	Charleston	68
10	Hofstra	56

* denotes overtime period

== Honors ==
CAA All-Tournament Team	Player	School
CAA All-Tournament Team	Taryn Barbot (MVP)	Charleston
CAA All-Tournament Team	Taylor Barbot	Charleston
CAA All-Tournament Team	Grace Ezebilo	Charleston
CAA All-Tournament Team	Alarice Gooden	Hofstra
CAA All-Tournament Team	Chloe Sterling	Hofstra
CAA All-Tournament Team	Emma Von Essen	Hofstra

== See also ==
- 2026 CAA men's basketball tournament
