= Danielle Santos Atkinson =

American basketball coach (born 1984)

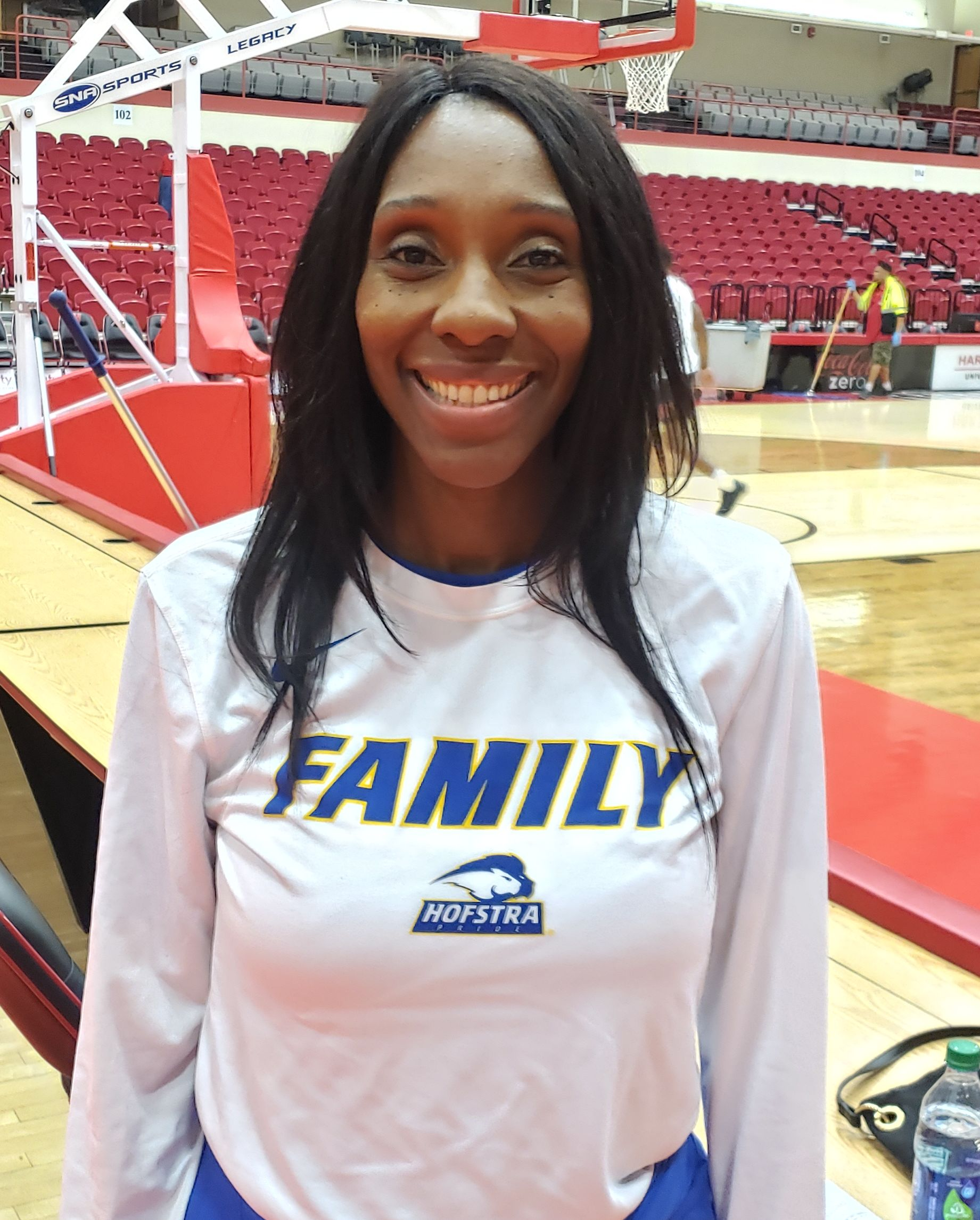
- Atkinson in 2019

Hofstra Pride
- Title: Head coach
- League: Coastal Athletic Association

Personal information
- Born: April 9, 1984 (age 42) Atlanta, Georgia, U.S.
- Listed height: 5 ft 10 in (1.78 m)

Career information
- High school: Wheeler (Cobb County, Georgia)
- College: Florida (2002–2006)
- Position: Shooting guard / point guard
- Coaching career: 2006–present

Career history

Coaching
- 2006–2010: Hofstra (assistant)
- 2010–2012: Illinois State (assistant)
- 2012–2014: Kentucky (assistant)
- 2014–2018: Florida State (assistant)
- 2018–2019: Pittsburgh (associate HC)
- 2019–present: Hofstra

Danielle Santos Atkinson (born April 9, 1984) is an American basketball coach who is currently the head women's basketball coach at Hofstra University, a role she has held since 2019.

== Career statistics ==
Legend
GP	Games played	GS	Games started	MPG	Minutes per game
FG%	Field goal percentage	3P%	3-point field goal percentage	FT%	Free throw percentage
RPG	Rebounds per game	APG	Assists per game	SPG	Steals per game
BPG	Blocks per game	PPG	Points per game	**Bold**	Career high

Year	Team	GP	Points	FG%	3P%	FT%	RPG	APG	SPG	BPG	PPG
2002–03	Florida	28	159	28.4%	19.5%	**82.0%**	3.0	1.5	1.0	0.3	5.7
2003–04	Florida	**30**	**273**	**41.6%**	**37.9%**	75.5%	3.6	**3.3**	1.8	0.6	**9.1**
2004–05	Florida	19	128	38.2%	32.7%	80.0%	3.0	2.1	1.2	0.2	6.7
2005–06	Florida	**30**	271	35.8%	28.2%	76.2%	**4.9**	2.8	**1.9**	**0.6**	9.0
Career		107	831	36.2%	30.2%	78.2%	3.7	2.5	1.5	0.4	7.8

== Head coaching record ==
- Hofstra
- CAA

Record table
Season	Team	Overall	Conference	Standing	Postseason
**Hofstra Pride** (Colonial Athletic Association) (2019–present)
2019–20	Hofstra	3–27	0–18	10th	
2020–21	Hofstra	8–12	5–7	5th	
2021–22	Hofstra	8–20	4–14	9th	
2022–23	Hofstra	12–20	4–14	12th	
2023–24	Hofstra	11–21	3–15	T-12th	
2024-25	Hofstra	14-16	9-9	T-6th	
2025-26	Hofstra	11-22	6-12	10th	
Hofstra:		67–138 (.327)	31–89 (.258)		
Total:		67–138 (.327)			
National champion Postseason invitational champion Conference regular season champion Conference regular season and conference tournament champion Division regular season champion Division regular season and conference tournament champion Conference tournament champion
