= Union Pines High School =

American public school in North Carolina

Location
- 1981 Union Church Rd; Cameron, North Carolina 28326; United States; 35°19′04″N 79°20′48″W

Information
- Type: Public 4-year
- Established: 1964 (62 years ago)
- CEEB code: 340595
- Principal: Andrew McCormick
- Teaching staff: 77.10 (FTE)
- Enrollment: 1,409 (2023–2024)
- Student to teacher ratio: 18.27
- Colors: Columbia blue, navy blue, and white
- Athletics conference: Carolina Pines 6A
- Mascot: Viking
- Website: uphs.ncmcs.org

Union Pines High School is a four-year public high school located in Cameron, North Carolina. Opened in 1964, the school currently enrolls 1,359 students and is one of the three public high schools in the Moore County Public School Systems.

== Athletics ==
Union Pines is a member of the North Carolina High School Athletic Association (NCHSAA) and are classified as a 6A school. They are a part of the Carolina Pines 6A Conference, with conference member schools being in Lee, Harnett, and Johnston counties. The school has fielded several state championships in wrestling, tennis, golf, and basketball and individual state champions in wrestling, swimming, tennis, golf, and track and field.

== Notable alumni ==
- Jeff Hardy, professional wrestler
- Matt Hardy, professional wrestler
- Trevor Lee, professional wrestler
