= 2024–25 Stony Brook Seawolves women's basketball team =

American college basketball season

2024–25 Stony Brook Seawolves women's basketball
- Conference: Coastal Athletic Association
- Record: 12–18 (7–11 CAA)
- Head coach: Joy McCorvey (1st season)
- Assistant coaches: Anjalé Barrett; Kiah Gillespie; Jon Plefka
- Home arena: Stony Brook Arena

2024–25 CAA women's basketball standings
	Conf.				Overall
Team	W		L	PCT	W		L	PCT
North Carolina A&T	15	–	3	.833	19	–	12	.613
Charleston	14	–	4	.778	25	–	8	.758
Campbell	12	–	6	.667	22	–	13	.629
Drexel	12	–	6	.667	17	–	13	.567
Monmouth	10	–	8	.556	16	–	15	.516
Elon	9	–	9	.500	15	–	15	.500
Delaware	9	–	9	.500	13	–	17	.433
Hofstra	9	–	9	.500	14	–	16	.467
William & Mary †	8	–	10	.444	16	–	19	.457
UNC Wilmington	8	–	10	.444	14	–	18	.438
Towson	8	–	10	.444	12	–	20	.375
Stony Brook	7	–	11	.389	12	–	18	.400
Hampton	3	–	15	.167	8	–	23	.258
Northeastern	2	–	16	.111	3	–	25	.107
† 2025 CAA tournament winner

The 2024–25 Stony Brook Seawolves women's basketball team represented Stony Brook University during the 2024–25 NCAA Division I women's basketball season. The Seawolves, led by first-year head coach Joy McCorvey, played their home games at Stony Brook Arena in Stony Brook, New York as members of the Coastal Athletic Association (CAA).

== Previous season ==
The Seawolves finished the 2023–24 season 28–5, 16–2 in CAA play, to finish as CAA regular-season champions. They defeated Campbell and North Carolina A&T, before being upset by #7 seed Drexel in the CAA tournament championship game. They received an automatic bid to the WBIT, where they defeated James Madison in the first round, before falling to eventual tournament champions Illinois in the second round.

On April 2, 2024, head coach Ashley Langford announced that she would be stepping down from her position, after three seasons, in order to take the head coaching position at her alma mater, Tulane. On April 15, the school announced that they would be hiring Tennessee assistant coach Joy McCorvey as the Seawolves' new head coach.

== Roster ==
2024–25 Stony Brook Seawolves women's basketball team
Players
Coaches

Pos.	#	Name	Height	Year	Previous school	Hometown
G	0	Chloe Oliver	5 ft 8 in (1.73 m)	So	Davidson	Montreal, QC
G	1	Devyn Scott	5 ft 8 in (1.73 m)	GS	Florida Atlantic	Montgomery, NY
G	2	Zaida Gonzalez	5 ft 9 in (1.75 m)	Sr	FIU	West Palm Beach, FL
G	3	Janay Brantley	6 ft 0 in (1.83 m)	So	Catskill High School	Catskill, NY
G	4	Ioanna Giannopoulou	5 ft 2 in (1.57 m)	Fr	Townsend Harris High School	Queens, NY
G	5	Breauna Ware	5 ft 8 in (1.73 m)	RS So	St. Bonaventure	Queens, NY
F	12	Dallysshya Moreno	6 ft 0 in (1.83 m)	RS Fr	Baldwin High School	The Bronx, NY
G	15	Shamarla King	6 ft 0 in (1.83 m)	GS	Virginia Tech	Hartford, CT
F	20	Nyajuok Toang	6 ft 0 in (1.83 m)	GS	Saint Louis	Des Moines, IA
G	21	Kelis Corley	5 ft 10 in (1.78 m)	GS	St. John's College High School	Capitol Heights, MD
C	22	Faith Wylder	6 ft 5 in (1.96 m)	Fr	Potomac Homeschool Christian Academy	New York City, NY
F	23	Lauren Filien	6 ft 1 in (1.85 m)	Jr	The Winchendon School	Cohoes, NY
G	30	Khalis Whiting	5 ft 6 in (1.68 m)	Jr	Abington High School	Philadelphia, PA
F	33	Elizabeth Field	6 ft 3 in (1.91 m)	Sr	Tilton School	Manchester, NH

Head coach

- Joy McCorvey (St. John's)

Assistant coach(es)

- Anjalé Barrett (Maryland)
- Kiah Gillespie (Florida State)
- Jon Plefka (Texas Tech)

Legend

- (C) Team captain
- (S) Suspended
- (I) Ineligible
- (W) Walk-on
- Injured
- Current redshirt

Roster
Last update: January 27, 2025

== Schedule and results ==
Date time, TV	Rank^{#}	Opponent^{#}	Result	Record	Site (attendance) city, state
Exhibition
October 30, 2024*; 7:00 p.m.		Adelphi	W 65–53	–	Stony Brook Arena; Stony Brook, NY
Non-conference regular season
November 4, 2024*; 7:00 p.m., SNY/ESPN+		at Columbia	L 47–87	0–1	Levien Gymnasium (874); New York, NY
November 7, 2024*; 6:31 p.m., FloHoops		Le Moyne	W 53–43	1–1	Stony Brook Arena (636); Stony Brook, NY
November 15, 2024*; 6:00 p.m., ESPN+		at Yale	W 62–48	2–1	John J. Lee Amphitheater (453); New Haven, CT
November 18, 2024*; 7:00 p.m., SNY/FloHoops		Marist	W 69–49	3–1	Stony Brook Arena (651); Stony Brook, NY
November 24, 2024*; 2:00 p.m., FloHoops		at St. John's	L 34–58	3–2	Carnesecca Arena (562); Queens, NY
November 27, 2024*; 12:00 p.m., SNY/FloHoops		Harvard	L 51–60	3–3	Stony Brook Arena (713); Stony Brook, NY
December 1, 2024*; 4:00 p.m., FloHoops		Fordham	L 55–64	3–4	Stony Brook Arena (2,172); Stony Brook, NY
December 8, 2024*; 2:00 p.m., ESPN+		at Holy Cross	L 56–73	3–5	Hart Center (391); Worcester, MA
December 14, 2024*; 2:00 p.m., ESPN+		at Buffalo	L 55–72	3–6	Alumni Arena (1,082); Amherst, NY
December 18, 2024*; 6:31 p.m., FloHoops		Georgian Court	W 67–29	4–6	Stony Brook Arena (554); Stony Brook, NY
December 22, 2024*; 1:00 p.m., SNY/FloHoops		Cornell	W 54–40	5–6	Stony Brook Arena (736); Stony Brook, NY
CAA regular season
January 3, 2025; 3:00 p.m., FloHoops		at Northeastern	W 72–51	6–6 (1–0)	Cabot Center (175); Boston, MA
January 5, 2025; 2:00 p.m., FloHoops		at Monmouth	L 61–75	6–7 (1–1)	OceanFirst Bank Center (711); West Long Branch, NJ
January 10, 2025; 7:00 p.m., SNY/FloHoops		William & Mary	W 66–48	7–7 (2–1)	Stony Brook Arena (752); Stony Brook, NY
January 12, 2025; 12:00 p.m., SNY/FloHoops		Charleston	W 87–83 ^{OT}	8–7 (3–1)	Stony Brook Arena (787); Stony Brook, NY
January 17, 2025; 7:00 p.m., FloHoops		at Elon	L 48–60	8–8 (3–2)	Schar Center (675); Elon, NC
January 19, 2025; 2:00 p.m., FloHoops		at North Carolina A&T	L 46–79	8–9 (3–3)	Corbett Sports Center (847); Greensboro, NC
January 24, 2025; 6:31 p.m., FloHoops		Northeastern	W 62–46	9–9 (4–3)	Stony Brook Arena (605); Stony Brook, NY
January 26, 2025; 1:00 p.m., FloHoops		Campbell	W 75–70	10–9 (5–3)	Stony Brook Arena (1,202); Stony Brook, NY
January 31, 2025; 7:00 p.m., FloHoops		at Charleston	L 53–66	10–10 (5–4)	TD Arena (375); Charleston, SC
February 2, 2025; 1:00 p.m., FloHoops		at UNC Wilmington	L 57–65	10–11 (5–5)	Trask Coliseum (854); Wilmington, NC
February 7, 2025; 7:00 p.m., SNY/FloHoops		Hofstra; Battle of Long Island	W 47–42	11–11 (6–5)	Stony Brook Arena (1,062); Stony Brook, NY
February 14, 2025; 12:00 p.m., SNY/FloHoops		Hampton	L 57–59	11–12 (6–6)	Stony Brook Arena (582); Stony Brook, NY
February 16, 2025; 2:00 p.m., FloHoops		at Towson	L 52–59	11–13 (6–7)	SECU Arena (731); Towson, MD
February 23, 2025; 2:00 p.m., FloHoops		at Campbell	L 51–76	11–14 (6–8)	Gore Arena (1,039); Buies Creek, NC
February 28, 2025; 7:00 p.m., SNY/FloHoops		Delaware	L 62–71	11–15 (6–9)	Stony Brook Arena (1,024); Stony Brook, NY
March 2, 2025; 1:00 p.m., SNY/FloHoops		Monmouth	L 56–63	11–16 (6–10)	Stony Brook Arena (663); Stony Brook, NY
March 6, 2025; 6:00 p.m., FloHoops/MSG		at Hofstra; Battle of Long Island	L 70–73 ^{OT}	11–17 (6–11)	Mack Sports Complex (627); Hempstead, NY
March 8, 2025; 12:00 p.m., SNY/FloHoops		Drexel	W 66–59	12–17 (7–11)	Stony Brook Arena (1,031); Stony Brook, NY
CAA tournament
March 12, 2025; 2:00 p.m., FloHoops	(12)	vs. (13) Hampton; First Round	L 75–76	12–18	CareFirst Arena; Washington, D.C.
*Non-conference game. ^{#}Rankings from AP poll. (#) Tournament seedings in parentheses. All times are in Eastern.
