= 2024–25 William & Mary Tribe women's basketball team =

American college basketball season

2024–25 William & Mary Tribe women's basketball

CAA tournament champions

NCAA tournament, first round
- Conference: Coastal Athletic Association
- Record: 16–19 (8–10 CAA)
- Head coach: Erin Dickerson Davis (3rd season)
- Assistant coaches: Dane Sparrow; Sugar Rodgers; Kenia Cole
- Home arena: Kaplan Arena

2024–25 CAA women's basketball standings
	Conf.				Overall
Team	W		L	PCT	W		L	PCT
North Carolina A&T	15	–	3	.833	19	–	12	.613
Charleston	14	–	4	.778	25	–	8	.758
Campbell	12	–	6	.667	22	–	13	.629
Drexel	12	–	6	.667	17	–	13	.567
Monmouth	10	–	8	.556	16	–	15	.516
Elon	9	–	9	.500	15	–	15	.500
Delaware	9	–	9	.500	13	–	17	.433
Hofstra	9	–	9	.500	14	–	16	.467
William & Mary †	8	–	10	.444	16	–	19	.457
UNC Wilmington	8	–	10	.444	14	–	18	.438
Towson	8	–	10	.444	12	–	20	.375
Stony Brook	7	–	11	.389	12	–	18	.400
Hampton	3	–	15	.167	8	–	23	.258
Northeastern	2	–	16	.111	3	–	25	.107
† 2025 CAA tournament winner

The 2024–25 William & Mary Tribe women's basketball team represented the College of William & Mary during the 2024–25 NCAA Division I women's basketball season. The Tribe, who were led by third-year head coach Erin Dickerson Davis, played their home games at Kaplan Arena in Williamsburg, Virginia as members of the Coastal Athletic Association (CAA). They finished the season 16–19, 8–10 in CAA play, to finish in ninth place.

On March 16, 2025, the Tribe defeated Campbell 66–63 in the finals of the CAA tournament, winning their first-ever conference championship, and marking the first March Madness appearance in school history for either of the women's or men's basketball teams. Having entered the tournament as the #9 seed with an overall record of 11–18, the Tribe became the lowest-ranked seed in CAA history to ever win the CAA championship.

Entering the NCAA tournament as one of the four lowest-ranked teams overall, the Tribe were matched up against Big South champion High Point in the First Four. Subsequently, on March 20, the Tribe defeated High Point 69–63, recording the first men's or women's March Madness win in school history, and advancing to the main field of 64. The Tribe then lost their first-round matchup to #1 seed Texas 105–61, ending their March Madness run.

Owing to their poor regular-season record, their unlikely conference championship, and their First Four victory, the 2024–25 Tribe were described as a Cinderella team.

== Previous season ==
The Tribe finished the 2023–24 season 15–14, 12–6 in CAA play, to finish in fifth place. They were upset by Hofstra in the second round of the CAA tournament.

== Roster ==
2024–25 William & Mary Tribe women's basketball team
Players
Coaches

Pos.	#	Name	Height	Year	Previous school	Hometown
G	0	Alexa Mikeska	5 ft 8 in (1.73 m)	Jr	Carlsbad High School	Carlsbad, CA
G	1	Cassidy Geddes	5 ft 7 in (1.7 m)	So	Newton-Conover High School	Hickory, NC
G	2	Monet Dance	5 ft 3 in (1.6 m)	So	Mount Pisgah Christian School	Roswell, GA
G	3	Kayla Beckwith	6 ft 1 in (1.85 m)	GS	Bullis School	Laurel, MD
G	5	Bella Nascimento	5 ft 8 in (1.73 m)	Sr	Manhattan	Grafton, MA
F	10	Marley Long	6 ft 2 in (1.88 m)	Fr	Sidwell Friends School	Washington, D.C.
G	11	Aislinn Gibson	6 ft 2 in (1.88 m)	So	Maine	Hingham, MA
F	12	Jana Sallman	6 ft 3 in (1.91 m)	So	Memphis	Cairo, Egypt
G	13	Sophia LeGoullon	6 ft 1 in (1.85 m)	Fr	Tilton School	Manchester, NH
F	14	Rebekah Frisby-Smith	5 ft 11 in (1.8 m)	GS	Forestville Eagles	Adelaide, Australia
F	21	Natalie Fox	6 ft 4 in (1.93 m)	Fr	Millbrook High School	LaGrangeville, NY
F	23	Kayla Rolph	6 ft 2 in (1.88 m)	Jr	Potomac School	Great Falls, VA
G	24	Emma West	5 ft 10 in (1.78 m)	Fr	Georgetown Visitation Prep	Great Falls, VA
F	35	Anahi-Lee Cauley	6 ft 0 in (1.83 m)	Sr	Villanova	Windsor, CT

Head coach

- Erin Dickerson Davis (Northwestern)

Assistant coach(es)

- Dane Sparrow (UNC Greensboro)
- Sugar Rodgers (Georgetown)
- Kenia Cole (Hampton)

Legend

- (C) Team captain
- (S) Suspended
- (I) Ineligible
- (W) Walk-on
- Injured
- Current redshirt

Roster
Last update: January 27, 2025

== Schedule and results ==
Date time, TV	Rank^{#}	Opponent^{#}	Result	Record	Site (attendance) city, state
Non-conference regular season
November 4, 2024*; 6:00 p.m., FloHoops		at Norfolk State	L 49–70	0–1	Echols Hall (1,924); Norfolk, VA
November 9, 2024*; 5:00 p.m., ESPN+		at Long Beach State	L 65–67	0–2	Walter Pyramid (1,093); Long Beach, CA
November 11, 2024*; 5:00 p.m., ESPN+		at UC Irvine	L 55–72	0–3	Bren Events Center (583); Irvine, CA
November 14, 2024*; 7:00 p.m., FloHoops		Chowan	W 66–42	1–3	Kaplan Arena (717); Williamsburg, VA
November 21, 2024*; 6:00 p.m., ESPN+		at Richmond	L 47–82	1–4	Robins Center (1,054); Richmond, VA
November 26, 2024*; 6:30 p.m., ESPN+		at Old Dominion; Rivalry	L 39–63	1–5	Chartway Arena (2,536); Norfolk, VA
November 29, 2024*; 2:00 p.m., FloHoops/MASN		Howard	L 63–74	1–6	Kaplan Arena (867); Williamsburg, VA
December 6, 2024*; 2:00 p.m., ESPN+		vs. McNeese; Shirley Duncan Classic	W 57–48	2–6	Joan Perry Brock Center; Farmville, VA
December 7, 2024*; 4:00 p.m., ESPN+		at Longwood; Shirley Duncan Classic	L 44–53	2–7	Joan Perry Brock Center (1,123); Farmville, VA
December 8, 2024*; 1:00 p.m., ESPN+		vs. South Carolina State; Shirley Duncan Classic	W 70–65	3–7	Joan Perry Brock Center; Farmville, VA
December 19, 2024*; 11:00 a.m., B1G+		at No. 8 Maryland	L 57–107	3–8	Xfinity Center (17,950); College Park, MD
CAA regular season
January 3, 2025; 7:00 p.m., FloHoops		Hampton	W 71–52	4–8 (1–0)	Kaplan Arena (766); Williamsburg, VA
January 5, 2025; 1:00 p.m., FloHoops		Elon	L 66–70 ^{OT}	4–9 (1–1)	Kaplan Arena (854); Williamsburg, VA
January 10, 2025; 7:00 p.m., FloHoops		at Stony Brook	L 48–66	4–10 (1–2)	Stony Brook Arena (752); Stony Brook, NY
January 12, 2025; 2:00 p.m., FloHoops		at Monmouth	W 83–74	5–10 (2–2)	OceanFirst Bank Center (686); West Long Branch, NJ
January 19, 2025; 1:00 p.m., FloHoops		at Northeastern	W 74–66	6–10 (3–2)	Cabot Center (325); Boston, MA
January 24, 2025; 7:00 p.m., FloHoops/MASN		UNC Wilmington	W 78–55	7–10 (4–2)	Kaplan Arena (815); Williamsburg, VA
January 26, 2025; 1:00 p.m., FloHoops		Towson	W 58–47	8–10 (5–2)	Kaplan Arena (1,009); Williamsburg, VA
January 31, 2025; 7:00 p.m., FloHoops		at Elon	W 64–59	9–10 (6–2)	Schar Center (1,119); Elon, NC
February 2, 2025; 1:00 p.m., FloHoops/MASN		Campbell	L 71–92	9–11 (6–3)	Kaplan Arena (1,356); Williamsburg, VA
February 9, 2025; 2:00 p.m., FloHoops		at Hampton	W 72–65 ^{OT}	10–11 (7–3)	Hampton Convocation Center (421); Hampton, VA
February 14, 2025; 6:00 p.m., FloHoops		at Drexel	L 58–59 ^{OT}	10–12 (7–4)	Daskalakis Athletic Center (311); Philadelphia, PA
February 16, 2025; 2:00 p.m., FloHoops		at Delaware	L 59–82	10–13 (7–5)	Bob Carpenter Center (1,527); Newark, DE
February 21, 2025; 7:00 p.m., FloHoops		North Carolina A&T	L 44–67	10–14 (7–6)	Kaplan Arena (1,056); Williamsburg, VA
February 23, 2025; 1:00 p.m., FloHoops		Charleston	L 76–79	10–15 (7–7)	Kaplan Arena (1,175); Williamsburg, VA
February 28, 2025; 7:00 p.m., FloHoops		Northeastern	W 71–51	11–15 (8–7)	Kaplan Arena (1,063); Williamsburg, VA
March 2, 2025; 1:00 p.m., FloHoops/MASN		Hofstra	L 34–54	11–16 (8–8)	Kaplan Arena (1,204); Williamsburg, VA
March 6, 2025; 7:00 p.m., FloHoops		at North Carolina A&T	L 52–77	11–17 (8–9)	Corbett Sports Center (803); Greensboro, NC
March 8, 2025; 2:00 p.m., FloHoops		at Campbell	L 55–73	11–18 (8–10)	Gore Arena (1,257); Buies Creek, NC
CAA tournament
March 13, 2025; 12:00 p.m., FloHoops	(9)	vs. (8) Hofstra; Second round	W 76–65	12–18	CareFirst Arena; Washington, D.C.
March 14, 2025; 12:00 p.m., FloHoops	(9)	vs. (1) North Carolina A&T; Quarterfinals	W 74–66 ^{OT}	13–18	CareFirst Arena; Washington, D.C.
March 15, 2025; 2:00 p.m., FloHoops	(9)	vs. (4) Drexel; Semifinals	W 76–54	14–18	CareFirst Arena; Washington, D.C.
March 16, 2025; 2:00 p.m., CBSSN	(9)	vs. (3) Campbell; Championship	W 66–63	15–18	CareFirst Arena; Washington, D.C.
NCAA tournament
March 20, 2025; 9:00 p.m., ESPN2	(16 B3)	vs. (16 B3) High Point; First Four	W 69–63	16–18	Moody Center (629); Austin, TX
March 22, 2025; 9:45 p.m., ESPN2	(16 B3)	at (1 B3) No. 5 Texas; First round	L 61–105	16–19	Moody Center (10,013); Austin, TX
*Non-conference game. ^{#}Rankings from AP poll. (#) Tournament seedings in parentheses. B3=Birmingham 3. All times are in Eastern.
