= 2024–25 Hampton Lady Pirates basketball team =

American college basketball season

2024–25 Hampton Lady Pirates basketball
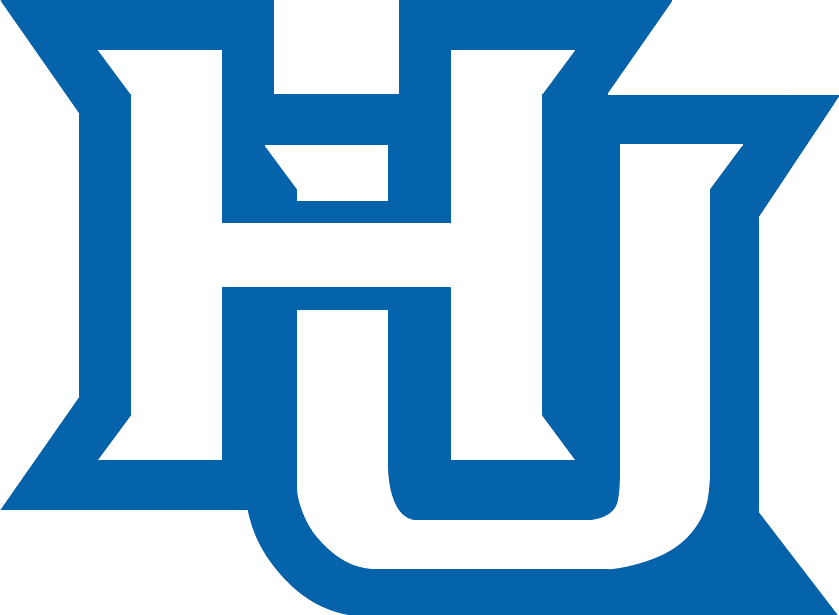
- Conference: Coastal Athletic Association
- Record: 5–14 (1–7 CAA)
- Head coach: Tamisha Augustin (1st season)
- Associate head coach: Dexter Holt
- Assistant coaches: Jaamal Rhodes; Brooke Moore
- Home arena: Hampton Convocation Center

2024–25 CAA women's basketball standings
	Conf.				Overall
Team	W		L	PCT	W		L	PCT
North Carolina A&T	15	–	3	.833	19	–	12	.613
Charleston	14	–	4	.778	25	–	8	.758
Campbell	12	–	6	.667	22	–	13	.629
Drexel	12	–	6	.667	17	–	13	.567
Monmouth	10	–	8	.556	16	–	15	.516
Elon	9	–	9	.500	15	–	15	.500
Delaware	9	–	9	.500	13	–	17	.433
Hofstra	9	–	9	.500	14	–	16	.467
William & Mary †	8	–	10	.444	16	–	19	.457
UNC Wilmington	8	–	10	.444	14	–	18	.438
Towson	8	–	10	.444	12	–	20	.375
Stony Brook	7	–	11	.389	12	–	18	.400
Hampton	3	–	15	.167	8	–	23	.258
Northeastern	2	–	16	.111	3	–	25	.107
† 2025 CAA tournament winner

The 2024–25 Hampton Lady Pirates basketball team represented Hampton University during the 2024–25 NCAA Division I women's basketball season. The Lady Pirates, led by first-year head coach Tamisha Augustin, played their home games at the Hampton Convocation Center in Hampton, Virginia, as members of the Coastal Athletic Association.

== Previous season ==
The Lady Pirates finished the 2023–24 season 3–26, 3–15 in CAA play, to finish in a three-way tie for last place. They were defeated by Hofstra in the first round of the CAA tournament.

On March 18, 2024, head coach David Six announced his retirement, after leading Hampton for 15 years. On March 26, the school announced the hiring of Florida associate head coach Tamisha Augustin as Six's successor.

== Roster ==
2024–25 Hampton Pirates women's basketball team
Players
Coaches

Pos.	#	Name	Height	Year	Previous school	Hometown
G	0	CeCe Thomas	5 ft 8 in (1.73 m)	GS	Georgia Southern	Plant City, Florida
G	1	Le'Asia Foreman	5 ft 8 in (1.73 m)	Jr	Norview High School	Norfolk, Virginia
G	2	Malaka Cobb	5 ft 5 in (1.65 m)	So	Shabach Christian Academy	Bowie, Maryland
G/F	3	Jenae Dublin	6 ft 2 in (1.88 m)	Sr	Georgia State	Suitland, Maryland
G	4	Arlisha Boston	5 ft 11 in (1.8 m)	So	King's Fork High School	Suffolk, Virginia
G	5	Diamond Wiggins	5 ft 10 in (1.78 m)	So	Monmouth	Norfolk, Virginia
G	10	Tyra Kennedy	5 ft 7 in (1.7 m)	So	Brooks-DeBartolo Collegiate High School	Tampa, Florida
G	11	Jasha Clinton	5 ft 8 in (1.73 m)	GS	Temple	Virginia Beach, Virginia
F	21	Casey Miller	6 ft 2 in (1.88 m)	So	Woodstock High School	Woodstock, Georgia
G	22	Amyah Reaves	5 ft 9 in (1.75 m)	Sr	Hamilton High School	Chandler, Arizona
F	23	Kiya Dorroh	6 ft 1 in (1.85 m)	Jr	UT Martin	Tucson, Arizona
F	24	Aisha Dabo	6 ft 2 in (1.88 m)	Sr	UMass	Queens, New York
G	25	Tiani Abrams	6 ft 1 in (1.85 m)	Jr	Northern Colorado	Vista, California
C	43	Arina Nikishina	6 ft 6 in (1.98 m)	Sr	Cal State Northridge	St. Petersburg, Russia

Head coach

- Tamisha Augustin (Alabama A&M)

Assistant coach(es)

- Dexter Holt (Alabama A&M)
- Jaamal Rhodes (Augusta State)
- Brooke Moore (Purdue)

Legend

- (C) Team captain
- (S) Suspended
- (I) Ineligible
- (W) Walk-on
- Injured
- Current redshirt

Roster
Last update: January 29, 2025

== Schedule and results ==
Date time, TV	Rank^{#}	Opponent^{#}	Result	Record	Site (attendance) city, state
Non-conference regular season
November 4, 2024*; 4:30 pm, FloHoops		Bowie State	W 65–55	1–0	Hampton Convocation Center (879); Hampton, VA
November 7, 2024*; 11:00 am, ESPN+		at Radford	L 55–65	1–1	Dedmon Center (3,000); Radford, VA
November 16, 2024*; 5:00 pm, FloHoops/Monumental		Norfolk State; Battle of the Bay	L 53–62	1–2	Hampton Convocation Center (2,752); Hampton, VA
November 20, 2024*; 7:30 pm, SECN+		at Vanderbilt	L 45–94	1–3	Memorial Gymnasium (2,353); Nashville, TN
November 25, 2024*; 7:00 pm, FloHoops		Eastern Kentucky	L 55–69	1–4	Hampton Convocation Center (312); Hampton, VA
December 1, 2024*; 2:00 pm, SECN+		at Georgia	W 76–74 ^{OT}	2–4	Stegeman Coliseum (2,133); Athens, GA
December 12, 2024*; 11:00 am, FloHoops		East Carolina	L 47–79	2–5	Hampton Convocation Center (727); Hampton, VA
December 17, 2024*; 7:00 pm, FloHoops		Gardner–Webb	W 76–67	3–5	Hampton Convocation Center (217); Hampton, VA
December 20, 2024*; 12:00 pm, ESPN+		at FIU; FIU Christmas Classic	L 60–70	3–6	Ocean Bank Convocation Center (517); Miami, FL
December 21, 2024*; 2:00 pm, ESPN+		vs. George Washington; FIU Christmas Classic	L 69–72	3–7	Ocean Bank Convocation Center (486); Miami, FL
December 30, 2024*; 4:00 pm		at Delaware State	W 64–47	4–7	Memorial Hall (124); Dover, DE
CAA regular season
January 3, 2025; 7:00 pm, FloHoops		at William & Mary	L 52–71	4–8 (0–1)	Kaplan Arena (766); Williamsburg, VA
January 5, 2025; 2:00 pm, FloHoops/Monumental		North Carolina A&T	L 48–75	4–9 (0–2)	Hampton Convocation Center (865); Hampton, VA
January 10, 2025; 5:00 pm, FloHoops		at Elon	L 51–59	4–10 (0–3)	Schar Center (680); Elon, NC
January 12, 2025; 2:00 pm, FloHoops		at Campbell	L 42–72	4–11 (0–4)	Gore Arena (1,129); Buies Creek, NC
January 17, 2025; 7:00 pm, FloHoops		Delaware	L 69–79	4–12 (0–5)	Hampton Convocation Center (955); Hampton, VA
January 19, 2025; 2:00 pm, FloHoops/Monumental		Drexel	L 58–59	4–13 (0–6)	Hampton Convocation Center (527); Hampton, VA
January 24, 2025; 7:00 pm, FloHoops/Monumental		Towson	W 61–58	5–13 (1–6)	Hampton Convocation Center (352); Hampton, VA
January 26, 2025; 2:00 pm, FloHoops/Monumental		UNC Wilmington	L 50–66	5–14 (1–7)	Hampton Convocation Center (237); Hampton, VA
January 31, 2025; 7:00 pm, FloHoops		at North Carolina A&T			Corbett Sports Center; Greensboro, NC
February 7, 2025; 6:30 pm, FloHoops		at Towson			TU Arena; Towson, MD
February 9, 2025; 2:00 pm, FloHoops		William & Mary			Hampton Convocation Center; Hampton, VA
February 14, 2025; 12:00 pm, FloHoops		at Stony Brook			Stony Brook Arena; Stony Brook, NY
February 16, 2025; 2:00 pm, FloHoops		at Monmouth			OceanFirst Bank Center; West Long Branch, NJ
February 21, 2025; 7:00 pm, FloHoops		Charleston			Hampton Convocation Center; Hampton, VA
February 28, 2025; 7:00 pm, FloHoops/Monumental		Hofstra			Hampton Convocation Center; Hampton, VA
March 2, 2025; 2:00 pm, FloHoops/Monumental		Northeastern			Hampton Convocation Center; Hampton, VA
March 6, 2025; 2:00 pm, FloHoops		at UNC Wilmington			Trask Coliseum; Wilmington, NC
March 8, 2025; 2:00 pm, FloHoops		at Charleston			TD Arena; Charleston, SC
CAA tournament
March 12–16, 2025; FloHoops		vs.			Entertainment and Sports Arena; Washington, D.C.
*Non-conference game. ^{#}Rankings from AP Poll. (#) Tournament seedings in parentheses. All times are in Eastern.
