= 2024–25 Charleston Cougars women's basketball team =

American college basketball season

2024–25 Charleston Cougars women's basketball

WNIT, Super 16
- Conference: Coastal Athletic Association
- Record: 25–8 (14–4 CAA)
- Head coach: Robin Harmony (6th season)
- Associate head coach: Randy Schneider
- Assistant coaches: Tiffany Conner; Chastadie Barrs
- Home arena: TD Arena

2024–25 CAA women's basketball standings
	Conf.				Overall
Team	W		L	PCT	W		L	PCT
North Carolina A&T	15	–	3	.833	19	–	12	.613
Charleston	14	–	4	.778	25	–	8	.758
Campbell	12	–	6	.667	22	–	13	.629
Drexel	12	–	6	.667	17	–	13	.567
Monmouth	10	–	8	.556	16	–	15	.516
Elon	9	–	9	.500	15	–	15	.500
Delaware	9	–	9	.500	13	–	17	.433
Hofstra	9	–	9	.500	14	–	16	.467
William & Mary †	8	–	10	.444	16	–	19	.457
UNC Wilmington	8	–	10	.444	14	–	18	.438
Towson	8	–	10	.444	12	–	20	.375
Stony Brook	7	–	11	.389	12	–	18	.400
Hampton	3	–	15	.167	8	–	23	.258
Northeastern	2	–	16	.111	3	–	25	.107
† 2025 CAA tournament winner

The 2024–25 Charleston Cougars women's basketball team represented the College of Charleston during the 2024–25 NCAA Division I women's basketball season. The Cougars, led by sixth-year head coach Robin Harmony, played their home games at TD Arena in Charleston, South Carolina, as members of the Coastal Athletic Association.

== Previous season ==
The Cougars finished the 2023–24 season 22–10, 13–5 in CAA play to finish in a tie for third place. They were upset by Towson in the quarterfinals of the CAA tournament. They received an at-large bid to the WNIT, where they defeated USC Upstate in the first round, before falling to Illinois State in the second round.

== Roster ==
2024–25 Charleston Cougars women's basketball team
Players
Coaches

Pos.	#	Name	Height	Year	Previous school	Hometown
G	0	Taylor Barbot	5 ft 9 in (1.75 m)	So	St. Mary's High School	Floral Park, New York
G	1	Jami Hill	5 ft 11 in (1.8 m)	So	St. Andrew's School	Kingston, Rhode Island
G	2	Nyah Willis	5 ft 10 in (1.78 m)	GS	North Carolina A&T	San Jose, California
G	3	Marissa Brown	6 ft 0 in (1.83 m)	Jr	Choctawhatchee High School	Fort Walton Beach, Florida
G	4	McKinley Brooks-Sumpter	5 ft 8 in (1.73 m)	GS	UNC Asheville	Columbia, South Carolina
G	5	Taryn Barbot	5 ft 10 in (1.78 m)	So	St. Mary's High School	Floral Park, New York
G	6	Sophia Tougas	6 ft 1 in (1.85 m)	RS Jr	Cal State Bakersfield	Glens Falls, New York
G	10	Alana Philpotts	5 ft 8 in (1.73 m)	Fr	Hamden High School	New Haven, Connecticut
G/F	11	Naylee Cortes	5 ft 10 in (1.78 m)	Jr	Central Pointe Christian Academy	Bogotá, Colombia
F	12	Raeanne Eccleston	6 ft 3 in (1.91 m)	Fr	Colonial High School	Orlando, Florida
F/C	13	Lara Rohkohl	6 ft 3 in (1.91 m)	Jr	Central Connecticut	Hanover, Germany
G	15	Leah Philpotts	5 ft 8 in (1.73 m)	Fr	Hamden High School	New Haven, Connecticut
G	21	Jazmyn Stone	5 ft 6 in (1.68 m)	RS So	Annie Wright Schools	Tacoma, Washington
F	22	Celina Blount	6 ft 3 in (1.91 m)	Fr	Lakota East High School	Liberty Township, Ohio

Head coach

- Robin Harmony (Miami (FL))

Assistant coach(es)

- Randy Schneider (FIU)
- Tiffany Conner (South Florida)
- Chastadie Barrs (Lamar)

Legend

- (C) Team captain
- (S) Suspended
- (I) Ineligible
- (W) Walk-on
- Injured
- Current redshirt

Roster
Last update: January 28, 2025

== Schedule and results ==
Date time, TV	Rank^{#}	Opponent^{#}	Result	Record	High points	High rebounds	High assists	Site (attendance) city, state
Non-conference regular season
November 4, 2024*; 11:00 am, FloHoops		Meredith	W 124–26	1–0	28 – Hill	12 – Rohkohl	7 – Tied	TD Arena (4,399); Charleston, SC
November 9, 2024*; 12:00 pm, FloHoops		Robert Morris	W 74–69 ^{OT}	2–0	20 – Stone	12 – Tar. Barbot	4 – Tar. Barbot	TD Arena (307); Charleston, SC
November 13, 2024*; 7:00 pm, FloHoops		North Carolina Central	W 84–54	3–0	17 – Tar. Barbot	11 – Rohkohl	5 – Tay. Barbot	TD Arena (322); Charleston, SC
November 20, 2024*; 6:00 pm, ESPN+		at Iona	W 77–41	4–0	15 – Tay. Barbot	11 – Rohkohl	5 – Tay. Barbot	Hynes Athletics Center (1,041); New Rochelle, NY
November 29, 2024*; 7:00 pm, FloHoops		South Alabama	W 83–62	5–0	23 – Tay. Barbot	10 – Rohkohl	6 – Tay. Barbot	TD Arena (269); Charleston, SC
December 1, 2024*; 12:00 pm, FloHoops		North Dakota State	L 59–72	5–1	22 – Tar. Barbot	11 – Rohkohl	1 – Tied	TD Arena (422); Charleston, SC
December 3, 2024*; 5:00 pm, ESPN+		at Charleston Southern	W 86–45	6–1	35 – Tar. Barbot	9 – Rohkohl	6 – Tay. Barbot	Buccaneer Field House (356); North Charleston, SC
December 11, 2024*; 7:30 pm, ESPN+		at Jacksonville State	W 66–47	7–1	13 – Tay. Barbot	15 – Rohkohl	4 – Tay. Barbot	Pete Mathews Coliseum (753); Jacksonville, AL
December 17, 2024*; 7:00 pm, FloHoops		Appalachian State	W 83–47	8–1	18 – Tar. Barbot	9 – Rohkohl	9 – Tay. Barbot	TD Arena (221); Charleston, SC
December 20, 2024*; 1:00 pm, ESPN+		vs. Northwestern; Hawk Classic semifinals	W 68–62	9–1	24 – Tar. Barbot	9 – Rohkohl	4 – Tay. Barbot	Hagan Arena (220); Philadelphia, PA
December 21, 2024*; 1:00 pm, ESPN+		at Saint Joseph's; Hawk Classic championship	L 54–59	9–2	23 – Tay. Barbot	6 – Tied	4 – Tay. Barbot	Hagan Arena (864); Philadelphia, PA
CAA regular season
January 3, 2025; 7:00 pm, FloHoops		Towson	W 67–50	10–2 (1–0)	16 – Tied	13 – Rohkohl	3 – Tar. Barbot	TD Arena (411); Charleston, SC
January 5, 2025; 2:00 pm, FloHoops		Campbell	W 78–63	11–2 (2–0)	16 – Brooks-Sumpter	7 – Tay. Barbot	6 – Tay. Barbot	TD Arena (431); Charleston, SC
January 10, 2025; 6:00 pm, FloHoops		at Hofstra	W 64–51	12–2 (3–0)	18 – Brooks-Sumpter	12 – Tied	3 – Tar. Barbot	Mack Sports Complex (537); Hempstead, NY
January 12, 2025; 12:00 pm, FloHoops		at Stony Brook	L 83–87 ^{OT}	12–3 (3–1)	29 – Tay. Barbot	9 – Rohkohl	5 – Tay. Barbot	Stony Brook Arena (787); Stony Brook, NY
January 17, 2025; 7:00 pm, FloHoops		Monmouth	L 55–59	12–4 (3–2)	12 – Tay. Barbot	10 – L. Philpotts	3 – Tied	TD Arena (372); Charleston, SC
January 24, 2025; 6:00 pm, FloHoops		at Drexel	L 56–58	12–5 (3–3)	16 – Rohkohl	12 – Tar. Barbot	4 – Tar. Barbot	Daskalakis Athletic Center (574); Philadelphia, PA
January 26, 2025; 2:00 pm, FloHoops		at Delaware	W 58–45	13–5 (4–3)	13 – Willis	8 – Tar. Barbot	3 – Tay. Barbot	Bob Carpenter Center (924); Newark, DE
January 31, 2025; 7:00 pm, FloHoops		Stony Brook	W 66–63	14–5 (5–3)	– -	– -	– -	TD Arena; Charleston, SC
February 2, 2025; 1:00 pm, FloHoops		Hofstra	W 73–42	15–5 (6–3)	– -	– -	– -	TD Arena; Charleston, SC
February 7, 2025; 7:00 pm, FloHoops		at North Carolina A&T	L 59–71	15–6 (6–4)	– -	– -	– -	Corbett Sports Center; Greensboro, NC
February 9, 2025; 2:00 pm, FloHoops		Northeastern	W 89–41	16–6 (7–4)	– -	– -	– -	TD Arena; Charleston, SC
February 16, 2025; 1:00 pm, FloHoops		at UNC Wilmington	W 64–61	17–6 (8–4)	– -	– -	– -	Trask Coliseum; Wilmington, NC
February 23, 2025; 1:00 pm, FloHoops		at William & Mary	W 79–76	18–6 (9–4)	– -	– -	– -	Kaplan Arena; Williamsburg, VA
February 25, 2025; 12:00 pm, FloHoops		at Hampton	W 70–58	19–6 (10–4)	– -	– -	– -	Hampton Convocation Center; Hampton, VA
February 28, 2025; 7:00 pm, FloHoops		Elon	W 91–51	20–6 (11–4)	– -	– -	– -	TD Arena; Charleston, SC
March 2, 2025; 2:00 pm, FloHoops		UNC Wilmington	W 99–63	21–6 (12–4)	– -	– -	– -	TD Arena; Charleston, SC
March 6, 2025; 7:00 pm, FloHoops		at Campbell	W 75–54	22–6 (13–4)	– -	– -	– -	Gore Arena; Buies Creek, NC
March 8, 2025; 2:00 pm, FloHoops		Hampton	W 93–66	23–6 (14–4)	– -	– -	– -	TD Arena; Charleston, SC
CAA tournament
March 14, 2025; 6:00 pm, FloHoops	(2)	vs. (7) Delaware; Quarterfinals	W 87–49	24–6	24 – Tar. Barbot	10 – Tay. Barbot	5 – Tay. Barbot	Entertainment and Sports Arena; Washington, D.C.
March 15, 2025; 4:30 pm, FloHoops	(2)	vs. (3) Campbell; Semifinals	L 59–80	24–7	26 – Tar. Barbot	8 – Tied	3 – Stone	Entertainment and Sports Arena (600); Washington, D.C.
WNIT
March 24, 2025*; 7:00 pm, FloHoops		Howard; Round 2	W 76–56	25–7	19 – Tar. Barbot	12 – Rohkohl	11 – Tay. Barbot	TD Arena (434); Charleston, SC
March 27, 2025*; 7:00 pm, B1G+		at Rutgers; Super 16	L 67–89	25–8	33 – Tar. Barbot	12 – Tar. Barbot	9 – Tay. Barbot	Jersey Mike's Arena (610); Piscataway, NJ
*Non-conference game. ^{#}Rankings from AP Poll. (#) Tournament seedings in parentheses. All times are in Eastern.
