= 2024–25 Drexel Dragons women's basketball team =

American college basketball season

2024–25 Drexel Dragons women's basketball
- Conference: Coastal Athletic Association
- Record: 17–13 (12–6 CAA)
- Head coach: Amy Mallon (5th season)
- Associate head coach: Stacy Weiss
- Assistant coaches: Belle Koclanes; Kayla Bacon; Stephen Perretta
- Home arena: Daskalakis Athletic Center

2024–25 CAA women's basketball standings
| | Conf. | | | | Overall |
| Team | W | | L | PCT | W | | L | PCT |
|---|---|---|---|---|---|---|---|---|
| North Carolina A&T | 15 | – | 3 | .833 | 19 | – | 12 | .613 |
| Charleston | 14 | – | 4 | .778 | 25 | – | 8 | .758 |
| Campbell | 12 | – | 6 | .667 | 22 | – | 13 | .629 |
| Drexel | 12 | – | 6 | .667 | 17 | – | 13 | .567 |
| Monmouth | 10 | – | 8 | .556 | 16 | – | 15 | .516 |
| Elon | 9 | – | 9 | .500 | 15 | – | 15 | .500 |
| Delaware | 9 | – | 9 | .500 | 13 | – | 17 | .433 |
| Hofstra | 9 | – | 9 | .500 | 14 | – | 16 | .467 |
| William & Mary † | 8 | – | 10 | .444 | 16 | – | 19 | .457 |
| UNC Wilmington | 8 | – | 10 | .444 | 14 | – | 18 | .438 |
| Towson | 8 | – | 10 | .444 | 12 | – | 20 | .375 |
| Stony Brook | 7 | – | 11 | .389 | 12 | – | 18 | .400 |
| Hampton | 3 | – | 15 | .167 | 8 | – | 23 | .258 |
| Northeastern | 2 | – | 16 | .111 | 3 | – | 25 | .107 |
† 2025 CAA tournament winner

The 2024–25 Drexel Dragons women's basketball team represented Drexel University during the 2024–25 NCAA Division I women's basketball season. The Dragons, led by fifth-year head coach Amy Mallon, played their home games at the Daskalakis Athletic Center in Philadelphia, Pennsylvania as members of the Coastal Athletic Association.

== Previous season ==
The Dragons finished the 2023–24 season 19–15, 10–8 in CAA play to finish in seventh place. They defeated Delaware, Monmouth, Towson, and upset top-seeded Stony Brook to win the CAA tournament championship, and earn the conference's automatic bid to the NCAA tournament. They received the #16 seed in the Portland Regional 4, where they would fall to the top region seed Texas in the first round.

== Roster ==
2024–25 Drexel Dragons women's basketball team
Players
Coaches

| Pos. | # | Name | Height | Year | Previous school | Hometown |
|---|---|---|---|---|---|---|
| G/F | 2 | Mariah Watkins | 6 ft 0 in (1.83 m) | Fr | Webster Schroeder High School | Rochester, New York |
| G | 3 | Amaris Baker | 5 ft 8 in (1.73 m) | Sr | Harcum College | Philadelphia, Pennsylvania |
| F | 4 | Jalyn McNeill | 5 ft 9 in (1.75 m) | Jr | Our Lady of Good Counsel High School | Damascus, Maryland |
| F | 5 | Chloe Hodges | 6 ft 0 in (1.83 m) | GS | St Michael's College | Adelaide, Australia |
| F | 11 | Deja Evans | 6 ft 2 in (1.88 m) | So | Albany | Conshohocken, Pennsylvania |
| G | 12 | Grace O'Neill | 5 ft 7 in (1.7 m) | Jr | Archbishop Carroll High School | West Chester, Pennsylvania |
| G | 15 | Cara McCormack | 5 ft 3 in (1.6 m) | GS | Holy Cross | Smithtown, New York |
| F | 22 | Clara Bergeron | 6 ft 2 in (1.88 m) | So | Cégep de Saint-Jean-sur-Richelieu | Montreal, Quebec |
| F | 25 | Iriona Gravley | 6 ft 0 in (1.83 m) | Fr | Williamstown High School | Williamstown, New Jersey |
| G/F | 33 | Emilee Jones | 5 ft 10 in (1.78 m) | Fr | Mansfield Timberview High School | Grand Prairie, Texas |
| G | 41 | Laine McGurk | 5 ft 10 in (1.78 m) | So | West Chester Rustin High School | West Chester, Pennsylvania |
| F | 55 | Molly Lavin | 6 ft 2 in (1.88 m) | Jr | American | London, England |

Head coach

- Amy Mallon (Saint Joseph's)

Assistant coach(es)

- Stacy Weiss (Drexel)
- Belle Koclanes (Richmond)
- Kayla Bacon (Drexel)
- Stephen Perretta (Villanova)

Legend

- (C) Team captain
- (S) Suspended
- (I) Ineligible
- (W) Walk-on
- Injured
- Current redshirt

Roster
Last update: January 27, 2025

== Schedule and results ==
| Date time, TV | Rank^{#} | Opponent^{#} | Result | Record | High points | High rebounds | High assists | Site (attendance) city, state |
Non-conference regular season
| November 7, 2024*; 7:00 pm, FloHoops | | Marist | W 64–53 | 1–0 | 21 – Baker | 6 – Lavin | 4 – Tied | Daskalakis Athletic Center (728); Philadelphia, PA |
| November 13, 2024*; 6:00 pm, NBCSP/FloHoops | | at La Salle; Big 5 Classic Pod 1 | W 73–40 | 2–0 | 22 – Baker | 10 – O'Neill | 7 – O'Neill | John Glaser Arena (652); Philadelphia, PA |
| November 20, 2024*; 6:00 pm, FloHoops | | UC Irvine | L 47–57 | 2–1 | 20 – Baker | 8 – Hodges | 4 – Hodges | Daskalakis Athletic Center (430); Philadelphia, PA |
| November 23, 2024*; 2:00 pm, ESPN+ | | at Temple; Big 5 Classic Pod 1 | L 43–52 | 2–2 | 18 – Evans | 11 – Evans | 3 – Lavin | Liacouras Center (1,453); Philadelphia, PA |
| November 27, 2024*; 1:00 pm, B1G+ | | at Penn State | L 78–86 ^{OT} | 2–3 | 20 – Tied | 7 – Hodges | 8 – McCormack | Bryce Jordan Center (1,888); University Park, PA |
| December 4, 2024*; 6:00 pm, NBCSP/FloHoops | | Lehigh | W 53–44 | 3–3 | 18 – Baker | 8 – Evans | 8 – Hodges | Daskalakis Athletic Center (359); Philadelphia, PA |
| December 6, 2024*; 5:45 pm, NBCSP | | vs. Saint Joseph's; Big 5 Classic 3rd Place Game | L 47–69 | 3–4 | 16 – Baker | 6 – O'Neill | 6 – Hodges | Finneran Pavilion (1,526); Villanova, PA |
| December 15, 2024*; 2:00 pm, ACCNX | | at Florida State | L 51–101 | 3–5 | 20 – Baker | 6 – Tied | 3 – O'Neill | Donald L. Tucker Center (1,163); Tallahassee, FL |
| December 18, 2024*; 7:00 pm | | at Norfolk State | L 56–68 | 3–6 | 19 – Baker | 8 – O'Neill | 6 – Hodges | Joseph G. Echols Memorial Hall (500); Norfolk, VA |
| December 29, 2024*; 2:00 pm, FloHoops | | Lebanon Valley | W 71–30 | 4–6 | 20 – McCormack | 7 – Tied | 5 – O'Neill | Daskalakis Athletic Center (414); Philadelphia, PA |
CAA regular season
| January 3, 2025; 6:00 pm, NBCSP/FloHoops | | Delaware | W 65–59 | 5–6 (1–0) | 13 – McCormack | 6 – Baker | 3 – Tied | Daskalakis Athletic Center (438); Philadelphia, PA |
| January 5, 2025; 2:00 pm, FloHoops | | Northeastern | W 70–55 | 6–6 (2–0) | 24 – Baker | 8 – Tied | 6 – Baker | Daskalakis Athletic Center (442); Philadelphia, PA |
| January 12, 2025; 2:00 pm, FloHoops | | at Hofstra | L 53–60 | 6–7 (2–1) | 14 – Baker | 5 – Baker | 4 – Tied | Mack Sports Complex (739); Hempstead, NY |
| January 17, 2025; 7:00 pm, FloHoops | | at North Carolina A&T | L 57–64 | 6–8 (2–2) | 33 – Baker | 6 – O'Neill | 6 – Hodges | Corbett Sports Center (939); Greensboro, NC |
| January 19, 2025; 2:00 pm, FloHoops | | at Hampton | W 59–58 | 7–8 (3–2) | 22 – Baker | 9 – Evans | 6 – O'Neill | Hampton Convocation Center (527); Hampton, VA |
| January 24, 2025; 6:00 pm, FloHoops | | Charleston | W 58–56 | 8–8 (4–2) | 19 – Baker | 5 – Tied | 6 – Hodges | Daskalakis Athletic Center (574); Philadelphia, PA |
| January 26, 2025; 1:00 pm, FloHoops | | Elon | W 64–37 | 9–8 (5–2) | 24 – Baker | 12 – O'Neill | 10 – Hodges | Daskalakis Athletic Center (396); Philadelphia, PA |
| January 31, 2025; 3:00 pm, FloHoops | | at Northeastern | | | | | | Cabot Center; Boston, MA |
| February 2, 2025; 2:00 pm, FloHoops | | Towson | | | | | | Daskalakis Athletic Center; Philadelphia, PA |
| February 7, 2025; 7:00 pm, FloHoops | | at Monmouth | | | | | | OceanFirst Bank Center; West Long Branch, NJ |
| February 9, 2025; 1:00 pm, NBCSP/FloHoops | | UNC Wilmington | | | | | | Daskalakis Athletic Center; Philadelphia, PA |
| February 14, 2025; 6:00 pm, FloHoops | | William & Mary | | | | | | Daskalakis Athletic Center; Philadelphia, PA |
| February 21, 2025; 7:00 pm, FloHoops | | at Campbell | | | | | | Gore Arena; Buies Creek, NC |
| February 23, 2025; 1:00 pm, FloHoops | | at Elon | | | | | | Schar Center; Elon, NC |
| February 28, 2025; 6:00 pm, NBCSP/FloHoops | | Monmouth | | | | | | Daskalakis Athletic Center; Philadelphia, PA |
| March 2, 2025; 2:00 pm, NBCSP/FloHoops | | Campbell | | | | | | Daskalakis Athletic Center; Philadelphia, PA |
| March 6, 2025; 6:30 pm, FloHoops | | at Delaware | | | | | | Bob Carpenter Center; Newark, DE |
| March 8, 2025; 12:00 pm, FloHoops | | at Stony Brook | | | | | | Stony Brook Arena; Stony Brook, NY |
CAA tournament
| March 12–16, 2025; FloHoops | | vs. | | | | | | Entertainment and Sports Arena; Washington, D.C. |
*Non-conference game. ^{#}Rankings from AP Poll. (#) Tournament seedings in parentheses. All times are in Eastern.
