= 2024–25 UNC Wilmington Seahawks women's basketball team =

American college basketball season

2024–25 UNC Wilmington Seahawks women's basketball
- Conference: Coastal Athletic Association
- Record: 14–18 (8–10 CAA)
- Head coach: Nicole Woods (2nd season)
- Associate head coach: Cherie Lea
- Assistant coaches: Hailey Yohn; Brittany Drew; Jake Seidel
- Home arena: Trask Coliseum

2024–25 CAA women's basketball standings
	Conf.				Overall
Team	W		L	PCT	W		L	PCT
North Carolina A&T	15	–	3	.833	19	–	12	.613
Charleston	14	–	4	.778	25	–	8	.758
Campbell	12	–	6	.667	22	–	13	.629
Drexel	12	–	6	.667	17	–	13	.567
Monmouth	10	–	8	.556	16	–	15	.516
Elon	9	–	9	.500	15	–	15	.500
Delaware	9	–	9	.500	13	–	17	.433
Hofstra	9	–	9	.500	14	–	16	.467
William & Mary †	8	–	10	.444	16	–	19	.457
UNC Wilmington	8	–	10	.444	14	–	18	.438
Towson	8	–	10	.444	12	–	20	.375
Stony Brook	7	–	11	.389	12	–	18	.400
Hampton	3	–	15	.167	8	–	23	.258
Northeastern	2	–	16	.111	3	–	25	.107
† 2025 CAA tournament winner

The 2024–25 UNC Wilmington Seahawks women's basketball team represented the University of North Carolina Wilmington during the 2024–25 NCAA Division I women's basketball season. The Seahawks, led by second-year head coach Nicole Woods, played their home games at Trask Coliseum in Wilmington, North Carolina as members of the Coastal Athletic Association.

== Previous season ==
The Seahawks finished the 2023–24 season 5–25, 3–15 in CAA play, to finish in last place. They were defeated by Northeastern in the first round of the CAA tournament.

== Roster ==
2024–25 UNC Wilmington Seahawks women's basketball team
Players
Coaches

Pos.	#	Name	Height	Year	Previous school	Hometown
F	0	Ali Zelaya	6 ft 4 in (1.93 m)	GS	North Carolina	Goodyear, Arizona
G	1	Mary Ferrito	5 ft 10 in (1.78 m)	Jr	Wisconsin	Plain City, Ohio
G	2	Taylor Henderson	5 ft 11 in (1.8 m)	RS So	Winston Salem Christian School	Charlotte, North Carolina
G	3	Kate Hollifield	5 ft 10 in (1.78 m)	Jr	Belmont	Shelby, North Carolina
G	4	Tia Dobson	5 ft 7 in (1.7 m)	Fr	Mainland High School	Daytona Beach, Florida
G	5	Finley Lohan	5 ft 10 in (1.78 m)	Fr	George Washington High School	Charleston, West Virginia
F	8	Isis Fitch	6 ft 0 in (1.83 m)	GS	Bradley	Homewood, Illinois
G	9	Ofir Parpara	5 ft 9 in (1.75 m)	Fr	Hapoel Petah Tikva	Kfar Saba, Israel
G	10	McCall King	5 ft 10 in (1.78 m)	Jr	Christ Church Episcopal School	Easley, South Carolina
F	11	Torin Rogers	6 ft 1 in (1.85 m)	Jr	Richmond	Brasstown, North Carolina
F	13	Corrie McLaughlin	6 ft 2 in (1.88 m)	So	Millbrook High School	Raleigh, North Carolina
G	20	Jania Hall	5 ft 8 in (1.73 m)	GS	Monmouth	Gaithersburg, Maryland
G	21	Kylah Silver	5 ft 10 in (1.78 m)	So	D. H. Conley High School	Greenville, North Carolina
G	22	Evan Miller	5 ft 11 in (1.8 m)	GS	Ardrey Kell High School	Charlotte, North Carolina
C	24	Angelina Pelayo	6 ft 3 in (1.91 m)	Fr	Sacred Heart Academy	Louisville, Kentucky

Head coach

- Nicole Woods (Belmont Abbey)

Assistant coach(es)

- Cherie Lea (UNC Wilmington)
- Hailey Yohn (Coker)
- Brittany Drew (Guilford)
- Jake Seidel (Wichita State)

Legend

- (C) Team captain
- (S) Suspended
- (I) Ineligible
- (W) Walk-on
- Injured
- Current redshirt

Roster
Last update: January 28, 2025

== Schedule and results ==
Date time, TV	Rank^{#}	Opponent^{#}	Result	Record	Site (attendance) city, state
Non-conference regular season
November 4, 2024*; 5:00 pm, ACCNX		at Virginia Tech	L 57–99	0–1	Cassell Coliseum (5,064); Blacksburg, VA
November 7, 2024*; 7:00 pm, ACCNX		at No. 15 North Carolina	L 50–77	0–2	Carmichael Arena (2,445); Chapel Hill, NC
November 10, 2024*; 4:00 pm, FloHoops		Clinton	W 79–42	1–2	Trask Coliseum (1,046); Wilmington, NC
November 14, 2024*; 11:00 am, ESPN+		at Presbyterian	W 78–74 ^{OT}	2–2	Templeton Center (880); Clinton, SC
November 16, 2024*; 1:00 pm, FloHoops		The Apprentice School	W 103–22	3–2	Trask Coliseum (522); Wilmington, NC
November 20, 2024*; 7:00 pm, FloHoops		Winthrop	W 66–48	4–2	Trask Coliseum (739); Wilmington, NC
November 23, 2024*; 1:00 pm, FloHoops		Norfolk State	L 52–71	4–3	Trask Coliseum (667); Wilmington, NC
November 28, 2024*; 4:00 pm		vs. San Jose State; Puerto Rico Clasico	W 65–61 ^{OT}	5–3	Coliseo Rubén Rodríguez (100); Bayamón, PR
November 29, 2024*; 5:00 pm		vs. UMass Lowell; Puerto Rico Clasico	W 56–40	6–3	Coliseo Rubén Rodríguez (100); Bayamón, PR
December 5, 2024*; 11:00 am, FloHoops		West Georgia	L 66–70	6–4	Trask Coliseum (2,810); Wilmington, NC
December 18, 2024*; 6:00 pm, ESPN+		at Coastal Carolina	L 64–96	6–5	HTC Center (655); Conway, SC
December 21, 2024*; 12:00 pm, ESPN+		at East Carolina	L 56–71	6–6	Williams Arena (1,308); Greenville, NC
December 29, 2024*; 1:00 pm, FloHoops		Longwood	L 68–84	6–7	Trask Coliseum (918); Wilmington, NC
CAA regular season
January 3, 2025; 7:00 pm, FloHoops		Campbell	W 67–61	7–7 (1–0)	Trask Coliseum (596); Wilmington, NC
January 5, 2025; 1:00 pm, FloHoops		Towson	L 69–70	7–8 (1–1)	Trask Coliseum (618); Wilmington, NC
January 12, 2025; 1:00 pm, FloHoops		at Northeastern	W 51–48	8–8 (2–1)	Cabot Center (176); Boston, MA
January 17, 2025; 7:00 pm, FloHoops		at Campbell	L 55–68	8–9 (2–2)	Gore Arena (1,097); Buies Creek, NC
January 19, 2025; 1:00 pm, FloHoops		Monmouth	W 80–77 ^{OT}	9–9 (3–2)	Trask Coliseum (817); Wilmington, NC
January 24, 2025; 7:00 pm, FloHoops		at William & Mary	L 55–78	9–10 (3–3)	Kaplan Arena (815); Williamsburg, VA
January 26, 2025; 2:00 pm, FloHoops		at Hampton	W 66–50	10–10 (4–3)	Hampton Convocation Center (237); Hampton, VA
January 31, 2025; 7:00 pm, FloHoops		Hofstra			Trask Coliseum; Wilmington, NC
February 2, 2025; 1:00 pm, FloHoops		Stony Brook			Trask Coliseum; Wilmington, NC
February 7, 2025; 6:30 pm, FloHoops		at Delaware			Bob Carpenter Center; Newark, DE
February 9, 2025; 1:00 pm, FloHoops		at Drexel			Daskalakis Athletic Center; Philadelphia, PA
February 14, 2025; 7:00 pm, FloHoops		Elon			Trask Coliseum; Wilmington, NC
February 16, 2025; 1:00 pm, FloHoops		Charleston			Trask Coliseum; Wilmington, NC
February 23, 2025; 2:00 pm, FloHoops		at Towson			TU Arena; Towson, MD
February 28, 2025; 7:00 pm, FloHoops		North Carolina A&T			Trask Coliseum; Wilmington, NC
March 2, 2025; 2:00 pm, FloHoops		at Charleston			TD Arena; Charleston, SC
March 6, 2025; 7:00 pm, FloHoops		Hampton			Trask Coliseum; Wilmington, NC
March 8, 2025; 2:00 pm, FloHoops		at North Carolina A&T			Corbett Sports Center; Greensboro, NC
CAA tournament
March 12–16, 2025; FloHoops		vs.			Entertainment and Sports Arena; Washington, D.C.
*Non-conference game. ^{#}Rankings from AP Poll. (#) Tournament seedings in parentheses. All times are in Eastern.
