= 2024–25 Delaware Fightin' Blue Hens women's basketball team =

American college basketball season

2024–25 Delaware Fightin' Blue Hens women's basketball
- Conference: Coastal Athletic Association
- Record: 13–17 (9–9 CAA)
- Head coach: Sarah Jenkins (3rd season)
- Associate head coach: Fred Batchelor
- Assistant coaches: Sam Pierce Jr.; Bri Hutchen
- Home arena: Bob Carpenter Center

2024–25 CAA women's basketball standings
	Conf.				Overall
Team	W		L	PCT	W		L	PCT
North Carolina A&T	15	–	3	.833	19	–	12	.613
Charleston	14	–	4	.778	25	–	8	.758
Campbell	12	–	6	.667	22	–	13	.629
Drexel	12	–	6	.667	17	–	13	.567
Monmouth	10	–	8	.556	16	–	15	.516
Elon	9	–	9	.500	15	–	15	.500
Delaware	9	–	9	.500	13	–	17	.433
Hofstra	9	–	9	.500	14	–	16	.467
William & Mary †	8	–	10	.444	16	–	19	.457
UNC Wilmington	8	–	10	.444	14	–	18	.438
Towson	8	–	10	.444	12	–	20	.375
Stony Brook	7	–	11	.389	12	–	18	.400
Hampton	3	–	15	.167	8	–	23	.258
Northeastern	2	–	16	.111	3	–	25	.107
† 2025 CAA tournament winner

The 2024–25 Delaware Fightin' Blue Hens women's basketball team represented the University of Delaware during the 2024–25 NCAA Division I women's basketball season. The Fightin' Blue Hens, led by third-year head coach Sarah Jenkins, played their home games at the Bob Carpenter Center in Newark, Delaware as members of the Coastal Athletic Association (CAA).

This will be Delaware's final season as members of the Coastal Athletic Association, as they will be moving to Conference USA, starting in the 2025–26 season.

== Previous season ==
The Fightin' Blue Hens finished the 2023–24 season 11–20, 7–11 in CAA play, to finish in a tie for ninth place. They were defeated by eventual tournament champions Drexel in the second round of the CAA tournament.

== Roster ==
2024–25 Delaware Fightin' Blue Hens women's basketball team
Players
Coaches

Pos.	#	Name	Height	Year	Previous school	Hometown
G/F	0	Rebecca Demeke (5Y)	6 ft 0 in (1.83 m)	Sr	Rhode Island	Toronto, ON
F	1	Michelle Ojo	6 ft 0 in (1.83 m)	Sr	George Washington	Virginia Beach, VA
G	2	Tara Cousins	5 ft 8 in (1.73 m)	GS	New Hope Academy	Washington, D.C.
G	3	Ella Wanzer	5 ft 10 in (1.78 m)	GS	Binghamton	Buffalo, NY
G	4	Trinity Vance	5 ft 10 in (1.78 m)	Fr	Legacy Early College	Waterloo, SC
G	5	Grace Sundback	5 ft 9 in (1.75 m)	So	Westtown School	Staten Island, NY
G	12	Jiya Perry	5 ft 10 in (1.78 m)	Jr	SMU	DeSoto, TX
F	13	Arantxa Portalez	6 ft 2 in (1.88 m)	So	Romareda Agustinos Recoletos	Zaragoza, Spain
C	21	Ande'a Cherisier	6 ft 1 in (1.85 m)	So	Saint Frances Academy	Baltimore, MD
G	22	Sydney Boone	5 ft 8 in (1.73 m)	GS	Richmond	Richmond, VA
F	23	Chloe Wilson	5 ft 11 in (1.8 m)	GS	Fairleigh Dickinson	Freeport, NY
G	32	Lia Samuels	5 ft 6 in (1.68 m)	Jr	Widener	Staten Island, NY
C	55	Gianna Johnson	6 ft 5 in (1.96 m)	Fr	George School	Levittown, PA

Head coach

- Sarah Jenkins (Georgetown)

Assistant coach(es)

- Fred Batchelor (Valley Forge)
- Sam Pierce Jr. (Slippery Rock)
- Bri Hutchen (Alabama)

Legend

- (C) Team captain
- (S) Suspended
- (I) Ineligible
- (W) Walk-on
- (5Y) Fifth-year senior
- Injured
- Current redshirt

Roster
Last update: January 29, 2025

== Schedule and results ==
Date time, TV	Rank^{#}	Opponent^{#}	Result	Record	Site (attendance) city, state
Non-conference regular season
November 4, 2024*; 5:00 p.m., ESPN+		at George Washington	L 66–78	0–1	Charles E. Smith Center (294); Washington, D.C.
November 9, 2024*; 12:00 p.m., ESPN+		at La Salle	L 54–68	0–2	John Glaser Arena; Philadelphia, PA
November 12, 2024*; 6:30 p.m., FloHoops		Temple	L 56–67	0–3	Bob Carpenter Center (1,199); Newark, DE
November 19, 2024*; 11:00 a.m., FloHoops		Colgate	W 88–82	1–3	Bob Carpenter Center (4,631); Newark, DE
November 24, 2024*; 2:00 p.m., FloHoops		at Providence	L 53–60	1–4	Alumni Hall (825); Providence, RI
November 29, 2024*; 6:45 p.m.		vs. Tarleton State; Big Easy Classic	L 40–54	1–5	Alario Center (143); Westwego, LA
November 30, 2024*; 6:45 p.m.		vs. Evansville; Big Easy Classic	W 65–54	2–5	Alario Center (108); Westwego, LA
December 7, 2024*; 2:00 p.m., FloHoops		Delaware State	W 73–26	3–5	Bob Carpenter Center (971); Newark, DE
December 11, 2024*; 6:30 p.m., FloHoops		Villanova	L 65–75	3–6	Bob Carpenter Center (1,157); Newark, DE
December 19, 2024*; 6:00 p.m., ESPN+		at Navy	L 69–79	3–7	Alumni Hall (462); Annapolis, MD
December 22, 2024*; 1:00 p.m., ESPN+		at Old Dominion	Postponed (Note: Game was postponed due to a lack of available players for Delaware.)		Chartway Arena; Norfolk, VA
December 30, 2024*; 1:00 p.m., ESPN+		at Harvard	Cancelled		Lavietes Pavilion; Cambridge, MA
CAA regular season
January 3, 2025; 6:00 p.m., FloHoops		at Drexel	L 59–65	3–8 (0–1)	Daskalakis Athletic Center (438); Philadelphia, PA
January 5, 2025; 2:00 p.m., FloHoops		Hofstra	L 57–63	3–9 (0–2)	Bob Carpenter Center (954); Newark, DE
January 10, 2025; 6:30 p.m., FloHoops		North Carolina A&T	L 49–65	3–10 (0–3)	Bob Carpenter Center (903); Newark, DE
January 17, 2025; 7:00 p.m., FloHoops		at Hampton	W 79–69	4–10 (1–3)	Hampton Convocation Center (955); Hampton, VA
January 19, 2025; 2:00 p.m., FloHoops		at Campbell	L 54–75	4–11 (1–4)	Gore Arena (1,039); Buies Creek, NC
January 24, 2025; 6:30 p.m., FloHoops		Elon	L 67–69	4–12 (1–5)	Bob Carpenter Center (1,423); Newark, DE
January 26, 2025; 2:00 p.m., FloHoops		Charleston	L 45–58	4–13 (1–6)	Bob Carpenter Center (924); Newark, DE
January 31, 2025; 6:30 p.m., FloHoops		at Towson	L 48–62	4–14 (1–7)	TU Arena (957); Towson, MD
February 2, 2025; 1:00 p.m., FloHoops		at Northeastern	W 62–54	5–14 (2–7)	Cabot Center (461); Boston, MA
February 7, 2025; 6:30 p.m., FloHoops		UNC Wilmington	W 72–67	6–14 (3–7)	Bob Carpenter Center (1,434); Newark, DE
February 9, 2025; 2:00 p.m., FloHoops		at Hofstra	W 73–65	7–14 (4–7)	Mack Sports Complex (632); Hempstead, NY
February 14, 2025; 6:30 p.m., FloHoops		Monmouth	W 70–61	8–14 (5–7)	Bob Carpenter Center (792); Newark, DE
February 16, 2025; 2:00 p.m., FloHoops		William & Mary	W 82–59	9–14 (6–7)	Bob Carpenter Center (1,527); Newark, DE
February 21, 2025; 7:00 p.m., FloHoops		at Elon	W 60–51	10–14 (7–7)	Schar Center (570); Elon, NC
February 23, 2025; 2:00 p.m., FloHoops		at North Carolina A&T	L 55–71	10–15 (7–8)	Corbett Sports Center (1,124); Greensboro, NC
February 28, 2025; 7:00 p.m., FloHoops		at Stony Brook	W 71–62	11–15 (8–8)	Stony Brook Arena (1,024); Stony Brook, NY
March 6, 2025; 6:30 p.m., FloHoops		Drexel	W 82–59	12–15 (9–8)	Bob Carpenter Center (1,199); Newark, DE
March 8, 2025; 3:00 p.m., FloHoops		Towson	L 59–69	12–16 (9–9)	Bob Carpenter Center (1,414); Newark, DE
CAA tournament
March 13, 2025; 6:00 pm, FloHoops	(7)	vs. (10) UNC Wilmington; Second round	W 71–55	13–16	CareFirst Arena; Washington, D.C.
March 14, 2025; 6:00 pm, FloHoops	(7)	vs. (2) Charleston; Quarterfinals	L 49–87	13–17	CareFirst Arena; Washington, D.C.
*Non-conference game. ^{#}Rankings from AP poll. (#) Tournament seedings in parentheses. All times are in Eastern.
