= 2024–25 Elon Phoenix women's basketball team =

American college basketball season

2024–25 Elon Phoenix women's basketball
- Conference: Coastal Athletic Association
- Record: 15–15 (9–9 CAA)
- Head coach: Charlotte Smith (14th season)
- Associate head coach: Josh Wick
- Assistant coaches: Edgar Farmer Jr.; Essence Baucom
- Home arena: Schar Center

2024–25 CAA women's basketball standings
	Conf.				Overall
Team	W		L	PCT	W		L	PCT
North Carolina A&T	15	–	3	.833	19	–	12	.613
Charleston	14	–	4	.778	25	–	8	.758
Campbell	12	–	6	.667	22	–	13	.629
Drexel	12	–	6	.667	17	–	13	.567
Monmouth	10	–	8	.556	16	–	15	.516
Elon	9	–	9	.500	15	–	15	.500
Delaware	9	–	9	.500	13	–	17	.433
Hofstra	9	–	9	.500	14	–	16	.467
William & Mary †	8	–	10	.444	16	–	19	.457
UNC Wilmington	8	–	10	.444	14	–	18	.438
Towson	8	–	10	.444	12	–	20	.375
Stony Brook	7	–	11	.389	12	–	18	.400
Hampton	3	–	15	.167	8	–	23	.258
Northeastern	2	–	16	.111	3	–	25	.107
† 2025 CAA tournament winner

The 2024–25 Elon Phoenix women's basketball team represented Elon University during the 2024–25 NCAA Division I women's basketball season. The Phoenix, led by 14th-year head coach Charlotte Smith, played their home games at the Schar Center in Elon, North Carolina as members of the Coastal Athletic Association.

== Previous season ==
The Phoenix finished the 2023–24 season 11–21, 7–11 in CAA play, to finish in a tie for ninth place. They were defeated by Campbell in the second round of the CAA tournament.

== Roster ==
2024–25 Elon Phoenix women's basketball team
Players
Coaches

Pos.	#	Name	Height	Year	Previous school	Hometown
F/C	0	Ava Leroux	6 ft 4 in (1.93 m)	RS Fr	South Fayette High School	Bridgeville, Pennsylvania
G	1	Regina Walton	5 ft 3 in (1.6 m)	Jr	Seton High School	Capitol Heights, Maryland
F	2	Iycez Adams	6 ft 0 in (1.83 m)	Sr	Quality Education School	Greensboro, North Carolina
G	3	Alyssa Ervin	5 ft 11 in (1.8 m)	Fr	Carroll County High School	Woodlawn, Virginia
G	4	Maraja Pass	5 ft 4 in (1.63 m)	So	Winston Salem Christian School	Shelby, North Carolina
G	5	Raven Preston	5 ft 11 in (1.8 m)	RS So	Quality Education School	Greensboro, North Carolina
G	8	Jayda Angel	5 ft 8 in (1.73 m)	Fr	Cape Fear High School	Fayetteville, North Carolina
G	10	Kamryn Doty	5 ft 5 in (1.65 m)	RS Jr	AZ Compass	Tucson, Arizona
G	11	Ruby Willard	5 ft 10 in (1.78 m)	Jr	San Dieguito Academy	Encinitas, California
G	12	Laila Anderson	5 ft 7 in (1.7 m)	Jr	Mount Olive	Burlington, North Carolina
G	15	Kierra Morrow	5 ft 10 in (1.78 m)	Fr	Cannon School	Charlotte, North Carolina
G	25	Samira Khalil	5 ft 9 in (1.75 m)	Fr	Hammond School	Lexington, South Carolina
G	30	Ashlee Shaw	5 ft 7 in (1.7 m)	Fr	West Cabarrus High School	Concord, North Carolina
C	33	Aly Wadkovsky	6 ft 2 in (1.88 m)	Jr	Lake Norman High School	Denver, North Carolina
F/C	43	Hannah Dereje	6 ft 3 in (1.91 m)	Jr	Elizabeth Seton High School	Burtonsville, Maryland

Head coach

- Charlotte Smith (North Carolina)

Assistant coach(es)

- Josh Wick (North Carolina)
- Edgar Farmer Jr. (North Carolina)
- Essence Baucom (Elon)

Legend

- (C) Team captain
- (S) Suspended
- (I) Ineligible
- (W) Walk-on
- Injured
- Current redshirt

Roster
Last update: January 25, 2025

== Schedule and results ==
Date time, TV	Rank^{#}	Opponent^{#}	Result	Record	High points	High rebounds	High assists	Site (attendance) city, state
Exhibition
November 1, 2024*; 7:00 pm		Winston-Salem State	W 76–46	–	–	–	–	Schar Center; Elon, NC
Non-conference regular season
November 4, 2024*; 6:00 pm, FloHoops		High Point	W 66–65	1–0	18 – Angel	9 – Preston	4 – Pass	Schar Center (321); Elon, NC
November 8, 2024*; 7:00 pm, FloHoops		Gardner–Webb	W 69–61	2–0	17 – Angel	8 – Preston	3 – Preston	Schar Center (558); Elon, NC
November 13, 2024*; 6:00 pm, ESPN+		at Marshall	L 56–65	2–1	12 – Preston	14 – Preston	3 – Doty	Cam Henderson Center (966); Huntington, WV
November 16, 2024*; 8:00 pm, FloHoops		Kent State	W 66–63	3–1	23 – Anderson	11 – Preston	5 – Pass	Schar Center (691); Elon, NC
November 23, 2024*; 2:00 pm, ACCNX		at Virginia Tech	L 69–87	3–2	20 – Angel	6 – tied	4 – Pass	Cassell Coliseum (5,156); Blacksburg, VA
November 26, 2024*; 6:00 pm, ESPN+		at Longwood	W 74–67	4–2	19 – Preston	13 – Preston	8 – Pass	Joan Perry Brock Center (907); Farmville, VA
December 4, 2024*; 11:00 am, FloHoops		Furman	L 57–61	4–3	12 – tied	7 – Adams	3 – Preston	Schar Center (2,783); Elon, NC
December 8, 2024*; 1:00 pm, ESPN+		at East Carolina	L 43–60	4–4	10 – tied	9 – Preston	5 – Preston	Williams Arena (1,157); Greenville, NC
December 15, 2024*; 3:00 pm, B1G+		at No. 5 USC	L 30–88	4–5	10 – Dereje	7 – Dereje	4 – Pass	Galen Center (4,818); Los Angeles, CA
December 19, 2024*; 4:00 pm, ESPN+		at Long Beach State	W 68–67	5–5	13 – Adams	14 – Preston	6 – Pass	Walter Pyramid (718); Long Beach, CA
December 31, 2024*; 1:00 pm, FloHoops		Lees–McRae	W 97–53	6–5	14 – Preston	9 – Preston	5 – Khalil	Schar Center (1,015); Elon, NC
CAA regular season
January 3, 2025; 7:00 pm, FloHoops		at North Carolina A&T	L 40–57	6–6 (0–1)	9 – Pass	10 – Preston	2 – tied	Corbett Sports Center (644); Greensboro, NC
January 5, 2025; 1:00 pm, FloHoops		at William & Mary	W 70–66 ^{OT}	7–6 (1–1)	16 – Preston	15 – Preston	4 – tied	Kaplan Arena (854); Williamsburg, VA
January 10, 2025; 5:00 pm, FloHoops		Hampton	W 59–51	8–6 (2–1)	15 – Angel	6 – Preston	5 – Pass	Schar Center (680); Elon, NC
January 17, 2025; 7:00 pm, FloHoops		Stony Brook	W 60–48	9–6 (3–1)	17 – Adams	9 – Angel	4 – Pass	Schar Center (675); Elon, NC
January 19, 2025; 1:00 pm, FloHoops		Hofstra	W 70–51	10–6 (4–1)	16 – Preston	10 – Preston	4 – Doty	Schar Center (757); Elon, NC
January 24, 2025; 6:30 pm, FloHoops		at Delaware	W 69–67	11–6 (5–1)	14 – Angel	5 – tied	4 – Angel	Bob Carpenter Center (1,423); Newark, DE
January 26, 2025; 1:00 pm, FloHoops		at Drexel						Daskalakis Athletic Center; Philadelphia, PA
January 31, 2025; 7:00 pm, FloHoops		William & Mary						Schar Center; Elon, NC
February 2, 2025; 1:00 pm, FloHoops		Monmouth						Schar Center; Elon, NC
February 9, 2025; 2:00 pm, FloHoops		at Towson						TU Arena; Towson, MD
February 14, 2025; 7:00 pm, FloHoops		at UNC Wilmington						Trask Coliseum; Wilmington, NC
February 16, 2025; 1:00 pm, FloHoops		Campbell						Schar Center; Elon, NC
February 21, 2025; 7:00 pm, FloHoops		Delaware						Schar Center; Elon, NC
February 23, 2025; 1:00 pm, FloHoops		Drexel						Schar Center; Elon, NC
February 28, 2025; 7:00 pm, FloHoops		at Charleston						TD Arena; Charleston, SC
March 2, 2025; 1:00 pm, FloHoops		North Carolina A&T						Schar Center; Elon, NC
March 6, 2025; 7:00 pm, FloHoops		at Northeastern						Cabot Center; Boston, MA
March 8, 2025; 2:00 pm, FloHoops		at Monmouth						OceanFirst Bank Center; West Long Branch, NJ
CAA tournament
March 12–16, 2025; FloHoops		vs.						Entertainment and Sports Arena; Washington, D.C.
*Non-conference game. ^{#}Rankings from AP poll. (#) Tournament seedings in parentheses. All times are in Eastern.
