= 2024–25 Northeastern Huskies women's basketball team =

American college basketball season

2024–1925 Northeastern Huskies women's basketball
- Conference: Coastal Athletic Association
- Record: 3–25 (2–16 CAA)
- Head coach: Priscilla Edwards-Lloyd (2nd season)
- Assistant coaches: Sean Smith; James Spinelli; Nicole Ambrose; Natalie Gallant
- Home arena: Cabot Center

2024–25 CAA women's basketball standings
	Conf.				Overall
Team	W		L	PCT	W		L	PCT
North Carolina A&T	15	–	3	.833	19	–	12	.613
Charleston	14	–	4	.778	25	–	8	.758
Campbell	12	–	6	.667	22	–	13	.629
Drexel	12	–	6	.667	17	–	13	.567
Monmouth	10	–	8	.556	16	–	15	.516
Elon	9	–	9	.500	15	–	15	.500
Delaware	9	–	9	.500	13	–	17	.433
Hofstra	9	–	9	.500	14	–	16	.467
William & Mary †	8	–	10	.444	16	–	19	.457
UNC Wilmington	8	–	10	.444	14	–	18	.438
Towson	8	–	10	.444	12	–	20	.375
Stony Brook	7	–	11	.389	12	–	18	.400
Hampton	3	–	15	.167	8	–	23	.258
Northeastern	2	–	16	.111	3	–	25	.107
† 2025 CAA tournament winner

The 2024–25 Northeastern Huskies women's basketball team represented Northeastern University during the 2024–25 NCAA Division I women's basketball season. The Huskies, led by second-year head coach Priscilla Edwards-Lloyd, played their home games at the Cabot Center in Boston, Massachusetts as members of the Coastal Athletic Association (CAA).

The Huskies finished the season 3–25, 2–16 in CAA play, to finish in 14th (last) place. They lost to Towson in the first round of the CAA tournament.

== Previous season ==
The Huskies finished the 2023–24 season 10–17, 5–13 in CAA play, to finish in eleventh place. They defeated UNC Wilmington before falling to Towson in the second round of the CAA tournament.

== Roster ==
2024–25 Northeastern Huskies women's basketball team
Players
Coaches

Pos.	#	Name	Height	Year	Previous school	Hometown
G	1	Bailey Williams	5 ft 7 in (1.7 m)	GS	Longwood	Midlothian, VA
G	2	Abby Jegede	5 ft 10 in (1.78 m)	RS So	Villanova	Toronto, ON
G	4	Samia Greene	5 ft 6 in (1.68 m)	Fr	Eastern HS	Washington, D.C.
C	10	Alyssa Staten	6 ft 2 in (1.88 m)	Fr	Statesboro HS	Statesboro, GA
F	11	Oralye Kiefer	6 ft 3 in (1.91 m)	Jr	Beaver Country Day School	Wayland, MA
G	12	Camille Clement	5 ft 8 in (1.73 m)	Sr	Greely HS	Cumberland, ME
F	14	Taylor Holohan	6 ft 0 in (1.83 m)	Fr	Averill Park HS	Averill Park, NY
G	15	Yirsy Quéliz	5 ft 4 in (1.63 m)	So	St. Mary's HS	La Vega, Dominican Republic
F	20	Sophia Carlisle	6 ft 3 in (1.91 m)	So	Bishop O'Connell HS	Alexandria, VA
G	22	Maddie Vizza	5 ft 6 in (1.68 m)	GS	Germantown Academy	Southampton, PA
F	23	Maya Summerville	6 ft 0 in (1.83 m)	Fr	Morristown HS	Morristown, NJ
F	24	Asha Parker	6 ft 2 in (1.88 m)	Sr	Northfield Mount Hermon	Milford, CT
G	25	Natalie Larrañaga	5 ft 9 in (1.75 m)	RS Jr	Florida National	Guatemala City, Guatemala
G	32	Marian Turnbull	5 ft 7 in (1.7 m)	Jr	Chartiers Valley HS	Pittsburgh, PA
G	33	María Sánchez Pitarch	5 ft 8 in (1.73 m)	Fr	Cambridge House CC	Rocafort, Spain

Head coach

- Priscilla Edwards-Lloyd (St. Bonaventure)

Assistant coach(es)

- Sean Smith (Rutgers)
- James Spinelli (Temple)
- Nicole Ambrose (Louisville)
- Natalie Gallant (Gordon)

Legend

- (C) Team captain
- (S) Suspended
- (I) Ineligible
- (W) Walk-on
- Injured
- Current redshirt

Roster
Last update: January 29, 2025

== Schedule and results ==
Date time, TV	Rank^{#}	Opponent^{#}	Result	Record	Site (attendance) city, state
Non-conference regular season
November 4, 2024*; 4:30 p.m., ESPN+		at Boston University	L 48–60	0–1	Case Gym (1,676); Boston, MA
November 11, 2024*; 2:00 p.m., ACCNX		at Boston College	L 46–92	0–2	Conte Forum (1,016); Chestnut Hill, MA
November 14, 2024*; 7:00 p.m., NESN+/FloHoops		New Hampshire	L 31–58	0–3	Cabot Center (398); Boston, MA
November 19, 2024*; 7:00 p.m., ESPN+		at Harvard	L 37–89	0–4	Lavietes Pavilion (514); Cambridge, MA
November 22, 2024*; 7:00 p.m., NEC Front Row		at Wagner	W 71–56	1–4	Spiro Sports Center (226); Staten Island, NY
December 1, 2024*; 2:00 p.m., NEC Front Row		at LIU	L 61–63	1–5	Steinberg Wellness Center (269); Brooklyn, NY
December 5, 2024*; 6:00 p.m., ESPN+		at UMass	L 50–81	1–6	Mullins Center (915); Amherst, MA
December 18, 2024*; 11:00 a.m., NESN/FloHoops		Stonehill	L 49–65	1–7	Cabot Center (1,003); Boston, MA
December 21, 2024*; 1:00 p.m., NESN/FloHoops		Holy Cross	L 37–61	1–8	Cabot Center (189); Boston, MA
CAA regular season
January 3, 2025; 3:00 p.m., NESN+/FloHoops		Stony Brook	L 51–72	1–9 (0–1)	Cabot Center (175); Boston, MA
January 5, 2025; 2:00 p.m., FloHoops		at Drexel	L 55–70	1–10 (0–2)	Daskalakis Athletic Center (442); Philadelphia, PA
January 12, 2025; 1:00 p.m., NESN/FloHoops		UNC Wilmington	L 48–51	1–11 (0–3)	Cabot Center (176); Boston, MA
January 17, 2025; 6:00 p.m., FloHoops		at Towson	L 43–79	1–12 (0–4)	TU Arena (318); Towson, MD
January 19, 2025; 1:00 p.m., NESN/FloHoops		William & Mary	L 66–74	1–13 (0–5)	Cabot Center (325); Boston, MA
January 24, 2025; 6:31 p.m., FloHoops		at Stony Brook	L 46–62	1–14 (0–6)	Stony Brook Arena (605); Stony Brook, NY
January 26, 2025; 2:00 p.m., FloHoops		at Monmouth	L 46–69	1–15 (0–7)	OceanFirst Bank Center (797); West Long Branch, NJ
January 31, 2025; 3:00 p.m., NESN/FloHoops		Drexel	L 47–53	1–16 (0–8)	Cabot Center (142); Boston, MA
February 2, 2025; 1:00 p.m., FloHoops		Delaware	L 54–62	1–17 (0–9)	Cabot Center (461); Boston, MA
February 7, 2025; 7:00 p.m., FloHoops		at Campbell	L 41–81	1–18 (0–10)	Gore Arena (965); Buies Creek, NC
February 9, 2025; 2:00 p.m., FloHoops		at Charleston	L 41–89	1–19 (0–11)	TD Arena (457); Charleston, SC
February 14, 2025; 7:00 p.m., FloHoops		North Carolina A&T	L 55–73	1–20 (0–12)	Cabot Center; Boston, MA
February 16, 2025; 1:00 p.m., NESN+/FloHoops		Hofstra	W 61–51	2–20 (1–12)	Cabot Center; Boston, MA
February 21, 2025; 7:00 p.m., NESN+/FloHoops		Towson	L 51–67	2–21 (1–13)	Cabot Center (176); Boston, MA
February 28, 2025; 7:00 p.m., FloHoops		at William & Mary	L 51–71	2–22 (1–14)	Kaplan Arena (1063); Williamsburg, VA
March 2, 2025; 2:00 p.m., FloHoops		at Hampton	L 66–68	2–23 (1–15)	Hampton Convocation Center (330); Hampton, VA
March 6, 2025; 7:00 p.m., FloHoops		Elon	W 49–43	3–23 (2–15)	Cabot Center (129); Boston, MA
March 8, 2025; 2:00 p.m., FloHoops		at Hofstra	L 53–69	3–24 (2–16)	Mack Sports Complex (811); Hempstead, NY
CAA tournament
March 12–16, 2025; 4:30 p.m., FloHoops	(14)	vs. (11) Towson; First round	L 44–67	3–25	Entertainment and Sports Arena (200); Washington, D.C.
*Non-conference game. ^{#}Rankings from AP poll. (#) Tournament seedings in parentheses. All times are in Eastern.
