= 2024–25 North Carolina A&T Aggies women's basketball team =

American college basketball season

2024–25 North Carolina A&T Aggies women's basketball

CAA regular season champion

WBIT, First round
- Conference: Coastal Athletic Association
- Record: 19–12 (15–3 CAA)
- Head coach: Tarrell Robinson (13th season)
- Associate head coach: Shavon Earp
- Assistant coaches: Kelly Mathis; Chris Dunn
- Home arena: Corbett Sports Center

2024–25 CAA women's basketball standings
	Conf.				Overall
Team	W		L	PCT	W		L	PCT
North Carolina A&T	15	–	3	.833	19	–	12	.613
Charleston	14	–	4	.778	25	–	8	.758
Campbell	12	–	6	.667	22	–	13	.629
Drexel	12	–	6	.667	17	–	13	.567
Monmouth	10	–	8	.556	16	–	15	.516
Elon	9	–	9	.500	15	–	15	.500
Delaware	9	–	9	.500	13	–	17	.433
Hofstra	9	–	9	.500	14	–	16	.467
William & Mary †	8	–	10	.444	16	–	19	.457
UNC Wilmington	8	–	10	.444	14	–	18	.438
Towson	8	–	10	.444	12	–	20	.375
Stony Brook	7	–	11	.389	12	–	18	.400
Hampton	3	–	15	.167	8	–	23	.258
Northeastern	2	–	16	.111	3	–	25	.107
† 2025 CAA tournament winner

The 2024–25 North Carolina A&T Aggies women's basketball team represented North Carolina A&T State University during the 2024–25 NCAA Division I women's basketball season. The Lancers, led by 13th-year head coach Tarrell Robinson, played their home games at the Corbett Sports Center in Greensboro, North Carolina as members of the Coastal Athletic Association.

== Previous season ==
The Aggies finished the 2023–24 season 22–12, 13–5 in CAA play, to finish in a tie for third place. They defeated Hofstra, before falling to top-seeded Stony Brook in the semifinals of the CAA tournament. They received an at-large bid into the WNIT, where they would defeat UNC Greensboro in the first round, and Old Dominion in the second round, before falling to Troy in the Super 16.

== Roster ==
2024–25 North Carolina A&T Aggies women's basketball team
Players
Coaches

Pos.	#	Name	Height	Year	Previous school	Hometown
F	0	Darrionna Howard	5 ft 11 in (1.8 m)	So	Delaware	Smithfield, North Carolina
G	1	Jakieya Thompson	5 ft 7 in (1.7 m)	RS Fr	St. Pauls High School	Hope Mills, North Carolina
G	2	Nahndi Smith	5 ft 6 in (1.68 m)	Sr	Asheville Christian Academy	Hendersonville, North Carolina
G	3	Reiven Douglas	5 ft 8 in (1.73 m)	Sr	Quinnipiac	Raleigh, North Carolina
F	5	Rachel Griffin	6 ft 3 in (1.91 m)	Fr	Rossville Academy	Oakland, Tennessee
G	6	Tamia Darden	5 ft 7 in (1.7 m)	Fr	Garner Magnet High School	Garner, North Carolina
F	8	Daija Powell	6 ft 2 in (1.88 m)	GS	Bradley	Fairburn, Georgia
G	10	D’Mya Tucker	5 ft 11 in (1.8 m)	GS	Orangeburg-Wilkinson High School	Orangeburg, South Carolina
G	11	Eva Andrews	5 ft 8 in (1.73 m)	Fr	Paul VI High School	Barrington, New Jersey
F	12	Ajia James	6 ft 1 in (1.85 m)	GS	Elon	Stafford, Virginia
C	14	Delaney Yarborough	6 ft 3 in (1.91 m)	Jr	Stony Brook	Ellicott City, Maryland
F	15	Elliott Jessup	6 ft 0 in (1.83 m)	Fr	RJ Reynolds High School	Winston-Salem, North Carolina
G	20	Raigan Lawrence	5 ft 8 in (1.73 m)	Jr	Avondale High School	Auburn Hills, Michigan
G	21	Jordyn Dorsey	5 ft 9 in (1.75 m)	Sr	Cross Creek High School	Augusta, Georgia
G/F	23	Amber Howard	6 ft 0 in (1.83 m)	Fr	Bensalem High School	Philadelphia, Pennsylvania
G	24	Maleia Bracone	5 ft 10 in (1.78 m)	GS	Presbyterian	Anderson, South Carolina
F	25	Paris Locke	6 ft 0 in (1.83 m)	So	McDonogh School	Baltimore, Maryland
F	32	Keona Curtis	6 ft 1 in (1.85 m)	Jr	Grovetown High School	Grovetown, Georgia
C	33	Chaniya Clark	6 ft 4 in (1.93 m)	RS Jr	Fort Myers High School	Fort Myers, Florida

Head coach

- Tarrell Robinson (North Carolina A&T)

Assistant coach(es)

- Shavon Earp (Radford)
- Kelly Mathis (Pfeiffer)
- Chris Dunn (West Virginia State)

Legend

- (C) Team captain
- (S) Suspended
- (I) Ineligible
- (W) Walk-on
- Injured
- Current redshirt

Roster
Last update: January 25, 2025

== Schedule and results ==
Date time, TV	Rank^{#}	Opponent^{#}	Result	Record	Site (attendance) city, state
Non-conference regular season
November 4, 2024*; 4:30 pm, ACCNX		at SMU	L 64–77	0–1	Moody Coliseum (953); University Park, TX
November 7, 2024*; 8:00 pm, ESPN+		at Rice	L 60–61	0–2	Tudor Fieldhouse (641); Houston, TX
November 12, 2024*; 7:00 pm, FloHoops		No. 14 North Carolina	L 47–66	0–3	Corbett Sports Center (3,593); Greensboro, NC
November 17, 2024*; 2:00 pm, ESPN+		at Mercer	L 38–46	0–4	Hawkins Arena (419); Macon, GA
November 21, 2024*; 7:00 pm, FloHoops		Winston-Salem State	W 68–42	1–4	Corbett Sports Center (2,094); Greensboro, NC
November 25, 2024*; 7:00 pm, FloHoops		North Carolina Central	W 62–39	2–4	Corbett Sports Center (2,084); Greensboro, NC
December 7, 2024*; 2:00 pm, ESPN+		at Liberty	L 51–56	2–5	Liberty Arena (1,013); Lynchburg, VA
December 15, 2024*; 2:00 pm, FloHoops		Norfolk State	L 59–68	2–6	Corbett Sports Center; Greensboro, NC
December 20, 2024*; 4:00 pm, ESPN+		at Florida Gulf Coast; FGCU Holiday Classic	L 48–79	2–7	Alico Arena; Fort Myers, FL
December 21, 2024*; 1:00 pm		vs. IU Indy; FGCU Holiday Classic	W 62–53	3–7	Alico Arena (107); Fort Myers, FL
December 31, 2024*; 5:00 pm, FloHoops		Mount Olive	W 100–42	4–7	Corbett Sports Center (526); Greensboro, NC
CAA regular season
January 3, 2025; 7:00 pm, FloHoops		Elon	W 57–40	5–7 (1–0)	Corbett Sports Center (644); Greensboro, NC
January 5, 2025; 2:00 pm, FloHoops		at Hampton	W 75–48	6–7 (2–0)	Hampton Convocation Center (865); Hampton, VA
January 10, 2025; 6:30 pm, FloHoops		at Delaware	W 65–49	7–7 (3–0)	Bob Carpenter Center (903); Newark, DE
January 12, 2025; 2:00 pm, FloHoops		at Towson	W 61–59	8–7 (4–0)	TU Arena (540); Towson, MD
January 17, 2025; 7:00 pm, FloHoops		Drexel	W 64–57	9–7 (5–0)	Corbett Sports Center (939); Greensboro, NC
January 19, 2025; 2:00 pm, FloHoops		Stony Brook	W 79–46	10–7 (6–0)	Corbett Sports Center (847); Greensboro, NC
January 24, 2025; 7:00 pm, FloHoops		at Monmouth	L 49–54	10–8 (6–1)	OceanFirst Bank Center (687); West Long Branch, NJ
January 26, 2025; 1:00 pm, FloHoops		at Hofstra	W 63–44	11–8 (7–1)	Mack Sports Complex (693); Hempstead, NY
January 31, 2025; 7:00 pm, FloHoops		Hampton	W 74–51	12–8 (8–1)	Corbett Sports Center (4,847); Greensboro, NC
February 7, 2025; 7:00 pm, FloHoops		Charleston	W 71–59	13–8 (9–1)	Corbett Sports Center (884); Greensboro, NC
February 9, 2025; 2:00 pm, FloHoops		Campbell	L 52–56	13–9 (9–2)	Corbett Sports Center (756); Greensboro, NC
February 14, 2025; 7:00 pm, FloHoops		at Northeastern	W 73–55	14–9 (10–2)	Cabot Center; Boston, MA
February 21, 2025; 7:00 pm, FloHoops		at William & Mary	W 67–44	15–9 (11–2)	Kaplan Arena (1,058); Williamsburg, VA
February 23, 2025; 1:00 pm, FloHoops		Delaware	W 71–55	16–9 (12–2)	Corbett Sports Center (1,124); Greensboro, NC
February 28, 2025; 7:00 pm, FloHoops		at UNC Wilmington	W 67–64	17–9 (13–2)	Trask Coliseum (867); Wilmington, NC
March 2, 2025; 1:00 pm, FloHoops		at Elon	L 69–70	17–10 (13–3)	Schar Center (1,204); Elon, NC
March 6, 2025; 7:00 pm, FloHoops		William & Mary	W 77–52	18–10 (14–3)	Corbett Sports Center (803); Greensboro, NC
March 8, 2025; 2:00 pm, FloHoops		UNC Wilmington	W 65–54	19–10 (15–3)	Corbett Sports Center (1,056); Greensboro, NC
CAA tournament
March 14, 2025; 12:00 pm, FloHoops	(1)	vs. (9) William & Mary; Quarterfinals	L 66–74	19–11	Entertainment and Sports Arena; Washington, D.C.
WBIT
March 20, 2025; 6:00 pm, ESPN+		at (1) Virginia Tech; First round	L 45–61	19–12	Cassell Coliseum (2,290); Blacksburg, VA
*Non-conference game. ^{#}Rankings from AP Poll. (#) Tournament seedings in parentheses. All times are in Eastern.
