= 2024–25 Campbell Fighting Camels women's basketball team =

American college basketball season

2024–25 Campbell Fighting Camels women's basketball
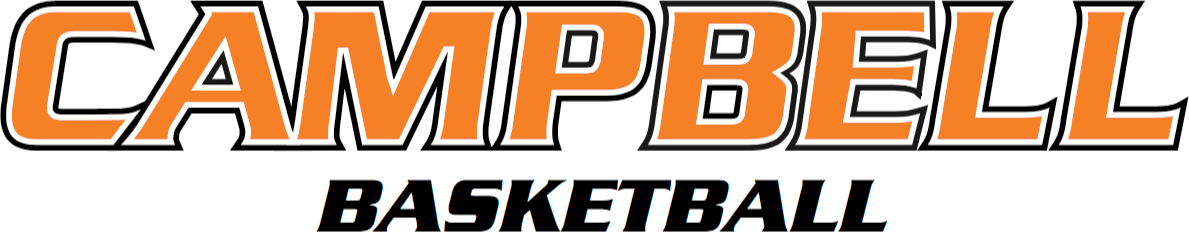

WNIT, Second Round
- Conference: Coastal Athletic Association
- Record: 22–13 (12–6 CAA)
- Head coach: Ronny Fisher (9th season)
- Associate head coach: Megan Hall
- Assistant coaches: Lakeisha Gregory; Shy Tuelle
- Home arena: Gore Arena

2024–25 CAA women's basketball standings
	Conf.				Overall
Team	W		L	PCT	W		L	PCT
North Carolina A&T	15	–	3	.833	19	–	12	.613
Charleston	14	–	4	.778	25	–	8	.758
Campbell	12	–	6	.667	22	–	13	.629
Drexel	12	–	6	.667	17	–	13	.567
Monmouth	10	–	8	.556	16	–	15	.516
Elon	9	–	9	.500	15	–	15	.500
Delaware	9	–	9	.500	13	–	17	.433
Hofstra	9	–	9	.500	14	–	16	.467
William & Mary †	8	–	10	.444	16	–	19	.457
UNC Wilmington	8	–	10	.444	14	–	18	.438
Towson	8	–	10	.444	12	–	20	.375
Stony Brook	7	–	11	.389	12	–	18	.400
Hampton	3	–	15	.167	8	–	23	.258
Northeastern	2	–	16	.111	3	–	25	.107
† 2025 CAA tournament winner

The 2024–25 Campbell Fighting Camels women's basketball team represented Campbell University during the 2024–25 NCAA Division I women's basketball season. The Fighting Camels, led by ninth-year head coach Ronny Fisher, played their home games at Gore Arena in Buies Creek, North Carolina as second-year members of the Coastal Athletic Association.

== Previous season ==
The Fighting Camels finished the 2023–24 season 17–14, 9–9 in CAA play, to finish in eighth place. They defeated Elon, before falling to top-seeded Stony Brook in the quarterfinals of the CAA tournament.

== Roster ==
2024–25 Campbell Fighting Camels women's basketball team
Players
Coaches

Pos.	#	Name	Height	Year	Previous school	Hometown
G	0	Jessica Woods	5 ft 7 in (1.7 m)	So	Westwood High School	Columbia, South Carolina
F	5	Mikayla Taborn	6 ft 3 in (1.91 m)	Fr	Franklinton High School	Youngsville, North Carolina
G	9	Emerson Thompson	5 ft 10 in (1.78 m)	Fr	Falls Lake Academy	Butner, North Carolina
G	11	Olivia Tucker	5 ft 7 in (1.7 m)	Fr	Panther Creek High School	Durham, North Carolina
G	12	Hadleigh Dill	6 ft 0 in (1.83 m)	So	Enka High School	Candler, North Carolina
F	13	Courtney Dahlquist	6 ft 3 in (1.91 m)	Sr	Trinity High School	Washington, Pennsylvania
G	15	Audrey Fuller	5 ft 10 in (1.78 m)	Sr	All Hallows' School	Brisbane, Australia
G	20	Gemma Núñez	5 ft 7 in (1.7 m)	Jr	I.E.S. Bahia de Almería	Almería, Spain
G	21	Logan Nuckols	5 ft 6 in (1.68 m)	Jr	Patrick Henry High School	Rockville, Virginia
G	22	Gianni Boone	5 ft 11 in (1.8 m)	Jr	St. John's College High School	Washington, D.C.
G	23	Jasmine Felton	5 ft 11 in (1.8 m)	Fr	Northeastern High School	Elizabeth City, North Carolina
F	24	Peris Smith	6 ft 2 in (1.88 m)	So	North Augusta High School	Graniteville, South Carolina
G	32	Ciara Alexander	6 ft 0 in (1.83 m)	Fr	Mount Paran Christian School	Atlanta, Georgia

Head coach

- Ronny Fisher (Furman)

Assistant coach(es)

- Megan Hall (Carson–Newman)
- Lakeisha Gregory (Austin Peay)
- Shy Tuelle (Campbell)

Legend

- (C) Team captain
- (S) Suspended
- (I) Ineligible
- (W) Walk-on
- Injured
- Current redshirt

Roster
Last update: January 28, 2025

== Schedule and results ==
Date time, TV	Rank^{#}	Opponent^{#}	Result	Record	Site (attendance) city, state
Non-conference regular season
November 4, 2024*; 5:30 pm, FloHoops		Mount Olive	W 72–29	1–0	Gore Arena (1,403); Buies Creek, NC
November 7, 2024*; 6:00 pm, ESPN+		at Western Carolina	L 72–73	1–1	Ramsey Center (589); Cullowhee, NC
November 14, 2024*; 7:00 pm, FloHoops		High Point	W 60–47	2–1	Gore Arena (705); Buies Creek, NC
November 19, 2024*; 7:00 pm, FloHoops		East Tennessee State	W 58–51	3–1	Gore Arena (771); Buies Creek, NC
November 22, 2024*; 5:00 pm, ACCNX		at Miami (FL)	L 66–71	3–2	Watsco Center (2,259); Coral Gables, FL
November 26, 2024*; 2:30 pm		vs. Furman; GSU Thanksgiving Tournament	W 82–72	4–2	GSU Convocation Center (285); Atlanta, GA
November 27, 2024*; 2:30 pm		vs. Purdue Fort Wayne; GSU Thanksgiving Tournament	W 71–67 ^{OT}	5–2	GSU Convocation Center (320); Atlanta, GA
November 28, 2024*; 12:00 pm, ESPN+		at Georgia State; GSU Thanksgiving Tournament	L 43–58	5–3	GSU Convocation Center (285); Atlanta, GA
December 4, 2024*; 11:30 am, ACCNX		at Wake Forest	L 46–63	5–4	LJVM Coliseum (4,836); Winston-Salem, NC
December 16, 2024*; 11:30 am, FloHoops		Guilford	W 87–41	6–4	Gore Arena (2,845); Buies Creek, NC
December 21, 2024*; 12:00 pm, ACCNX		at Virginia Tech	L 46–81	6–5	Cassell Coliseum (5,062); Blacksburg, VA
December 30, 2024*; 2:00 pm, FloHoops		Bethune–Cookman	W 64–50	7–5	Gore Arena (1,152); Buies Creek, NC
CAA regular season
January 3, 2025; 7:00 pm, FloHoops		at UNC Wilmington	L 61–67	7–6 (0–1)	Trask Coliseum (596); Wilmington, NC
January 5, 2025; 2:00 pm, FloHoops		at Charleston	L 63–78	7–7 (0–2)	TD Arena (431); Charleston, SC
January 12, 2025; 2:00 pm, FloHoops		Hampton	W 72–42	8–7 (1–2)	Gore Arena (1,129); Buies Creek, NC
January 17, 2025; 7:00 pm, FloHoops		UNC Wilmington	W 68–55	9–7 (2–2)	Gore Arena (1,097); Buies Creek, NC
January 19, 2025; 2:00 pm, FloHoops		Delaware	W 75–54	10–7 (3–2)	Gore Arena (1,039); Buies Creek, NC
January 24, 2025; 6:00 pm, FloHoops		at Hofstra	L 47–55	10–8 (3–3)	Mack Sports Complex (509); Hempstead, NY
January 26, 2025; 1:00 pm, FloHoops		at Stony Brook	L 70–75	10–9 (3–4)	Stony Brook Arena (1,202); Stony Brook, NY
January 31, 2025; 7:00 pm, FloHoops		Monmouth			Gore Arena; Buies Creek, NC
February 2, 2025; 1:00 pm, FloHoops		at William & Mary			Kaplan Arena; Williamsburg, VA
February 7, 2025; 7:00 pm, FloHoops		Northeastern			Gore Arena; Buies Creek, NC
February 9, 2025; 2:00 pm, FloHoops		at North Carolina A&T			Corbett Sports Center; Greensboro, NC
February 16, 2025; 1:00 pm, FloHoops		at Elon			Schar Center; Elon, NC
February 21, 2025; 7:00 pm, FloHoops		Drexel			Gore Arena; Buies Creek, NC
February 23, 2025; 2:00 pm, FloHoops		Stony Brook			Gore Arena; Buies Creek, NC
February 28, 2025; 6:00 pm, FloHoops		at Towson			TU Arena; Towson, MD
March 2, 2025; 2:00 pm, FloHoops		at Drexel			Daskalakis Athletic Center; Philadelphia, PA
March 6, 2025; 7:00 pm, FloHoops		Charleston			Gore Arena; Buies Creek, NC
March 8, 2025; 2:00 pm, FloHoops		William & Mary			Gore Arena; Buies Creek, NC
CAA tournament
March 14, 2025; 8:30 pm, FloHoops	(3)	vs. (11) Towson; Quarterfinals	W 73–54	20–11	Entertainment and Sports Arena (400); Washington, D.C.
March 15, 2025; 4:30 pm, FloHoops	(3)	vs. (2) Charleston; Semifinals	W 80–59	21–11	Entertainment and Sports Arena (600); Washington, D.C.
March 16, 2025; 2:00 pm, CBSSN	(3)	vs. (9) William & Mary; Championship	L 63–66	21–12	Entertainment and Sports Arena (700); Washington, D.C.
WNIT
March 20, 2025*; 6:00 pm, ESPN+		at Coastal Carolina; First Round	W 57–55	22–12	HTC Center (667); Conway, SC
March 23, 2025*; 7:00 pm, ESPN+		at Southern Indiana; Second Round	L 51–60	22–13	Screaming Eagles Arena (1,705); Evansville, IN
*Non-conference game. ^{#}Rankings from AP Poll. (#) Tournament seedings in parentheses. All times are in Eastern.
