= 2024–25 Monmouth Hawks women's basketball team =

American college basketball season

2024–25 Monmouth Hawks women's basketball
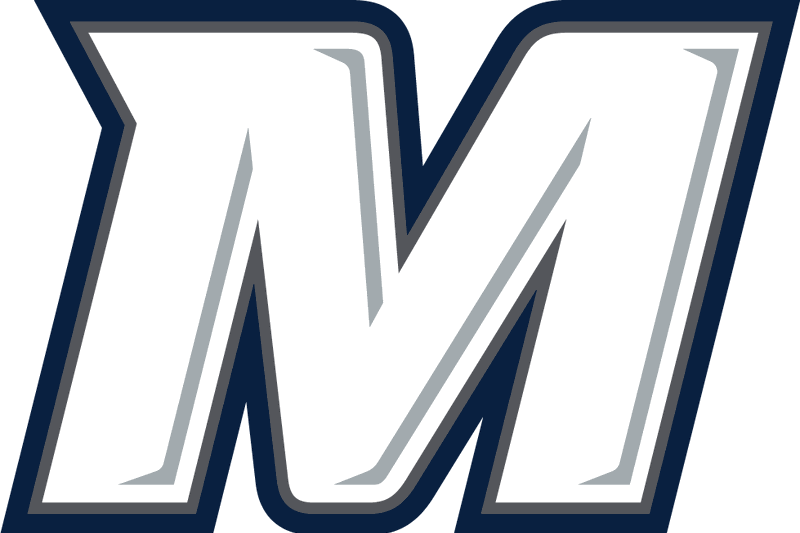
- Conference: Coastal Athletic Association
- Record: 16–15 (10–8 CAA)
- Head coach: Cait Wetmore (1st season)
- Assistant coaches: Alan Frey; Alex Frazier; Aja Boyd; Lola Mullaney
- Home arena: OceanFirst Bank Center

2024–25 CAA women's basketball standings
	Conf.				Overall
Team	W		L	PCT	W		L	PCT
North Carolina A&T	15	–	3	.833	19	–	12	.613
Charleston	14	–	4	.778	25	–	8	.758
Campbell	12	–	6	.667	22	–	13	.629
Drexel	12	–	6	.667	17	–	13	.567
Monmouth	10	–	8	.556	16	–	15	.516
Elon	9	–	9	.500	15	–	15	.500
Delaware	9	–	9	.500	13	–	17	.433
Hofstra	9	–	9	.500	14	–	16	.467
William & Mary †	8	–	10	.444	16	–	19	.457
UNC Wilmington	8	–	10	.444	14	–	18	.438
Towson	8	–	10	.444	12	–	20	.375
Stony Brook	7	–	11	.389	12	–	18	.400
Hampton	3	–	15	.167	8	–	23	.258
Northeastern	2	–	16	.111	3	–	25	.107
† 2025 CAA tournament winner

The 2024–25 Monmouth Hawks women's basketball team represented Monmouth University during the 2024–25 NCAA Division I women's basketball season. The Hawks, led by first-year head coach Cait Wetmore, played their home games at OceanFirst Bank Center in West Long Branch, New Jersey as members of the Coastal Athletic Association (CAA).

They finished the season 16–15, 10–8 in CAA play, to finish in fifth place.

== Previous season ==
The Hawks finished the 2023–24 season 22–10, 14–4 in CAA play, to finish in second place. They were upset by eventual tournament champions Drexel in the quarterfinals of the CAA tournament. They received an automatic bid into the WNIT, where they defeated Buffalo in the first round, before falling to Duquesne in the second round.

On April 9, 2024, head coach Ginny Boggess announced that she would be leaving the program, in order to take the head coaching position at Toledo. On April 22, the school announced that Charlotte associate head coach Cait Wetmore would be named Boggess' successor.

== Roster ==
2024–25 Monmouth Hawks women's basketball team
Players
Coaches

Pos.	#	Name	Height	Year	Previous school	Hometown
G	1	Rachel Kuhl	5 ft 7 in (1.7 m)	GS	Saint Peter's	Old Bridge, NJ
F	2	Taisha Exanor (5Y)	6 ft 0 in (1.83 m)	Sr	Pittsburgh	Châteauguay, QC
G	3	Sandrine Clesca (5Y)	5 ft 9 in (1.75 m)	Sr	Pittsburgh	Laval, QC
G	4	Kemari Reynolds	5 ft 7 in (1.7 m)	GS	Bryant	Manchester, NJ
G	7	Isabella Murray	5 ft 9 in (1.75 m)	So	Blair Academy	Green Brook, NJ
G	8	Dayshawna Carter	5 ft 7 in (1.7 m)	Sr	Kansas City	Harlem, NY
G	10	Alexis Stewart	5 ft 10 in (1.78 m)	GS	Akron	Hamilton, ON
F	11	Rebecca Milon	5 ft 11 in (1.8 m)	Fr	Capital Courts Academy	Nepean, ON
F	13	Divine Dibula	6 ft 1 in (1.85 m)	So	Champlain College Saint-Lambert	Ottawa, ON
G	14	Kellyn Preira	5 ft 11 in (1.8 m)	RS Fr	St. Mary's High School	Peabody, MA
G	15	Amiya Carroll	5 ft 11 in (1.8 m)	Jr	Sanford School	Smyrna, DE
G	22	Jaye Haynes (5Y)	5 ft 8 in (1.73 m)	Sr	La Salle	North Wales, PA
F	23	Ella Farrelly	6 ft 3 in (1.91 m)	Jr	King's Christian Collegiate	Oakville, ON
C	24	Belle Kranbuhl	6 ft 3 in (1.91 m)	GS	Adirondack Central High School	Boonville, NY
G	33	Damaris Rodriguez	5 ft 3 in (1.6 m)	Sr	New Jersey City	Secaucus, NJ

Head coach

- Cait Wetmore (Adelphi)

Assistant coach(es)

- Alan Frey (New Orleans)
- Alex Frazier (East Carolina)
- Aja Boyd (UNC Greensboro)
- Lola Mullaney (Harvard)

Legend

- (C) Team captain
- (S) Suspended
- (I) Ineligible
- (W) Walk-on
- (5Y) Fifth-year senior
- Injured
- Current redshirt

Roster
Last update: January 27, 2025

== Schedule and results ==
Date time, TV	Rank^{#}	Opponent^{#}	Result	Record	Site (attendance) city, state
Non-conference regular season
November 4, 2024*; 5:00 p.m., ESPN+		at Yale	L 61–64	0–1	John J. Lee Amphitheater (398); New Haven, CT
November 9, 2024*; 2:00 p.m., FloHoops		Brown	L 61–81	0–2	OceanFirst Bank Center (664); West Long Branch, NJ
November 12, 2024*; 7:00 p.m., ESPN+		at George Mason	L 66–89	0–3	EagleBank Arena (732); Fairfax, VA
November 15, 2024*; 6:00 p.m., ESPN+		at UMass	L 53–76	0–4	Mullins Center (964); Amherst, MA
November 17, 2024*; 1:00 p.m., B1G+		at Penn State	L 55–100	0–5	Bryce Jordan Center (1,751); University Park, PA
November 21, 2024*; 5:30 p.m., ESPN+		at Sacred Heart	L 56–63	0–6	William H. Pitt Center (1,686); Fairfield, CT
November 26, 2024*; 4:00 p.m., FloHoops/SNY/NBCSP		Saint Peter's	W 59–50	1–6	OceanFirst Bank Center (596); West Long Branch, NJ
December 1, 2024*; 2:00 p.m., FloHoops/NBCSP		Lafayette	W 60–54	2–6	OceanFirst Bank Center (687); West Long Branch, NJ
December 5, 2024*; 7:00 p.m., FloHoops/SNY/NBCSP		Rider	W 52–36	3–6	OceanFirst Bank Center (562); West Long Branch, NJ
December 9, 2024*; 7:00 p.m., ESPN+		at NJIT	W 63–54	4–6	Wellness and Events Center (234); Newark, NJ
December 21, 2024*; 4:30 p.m., FloHoops/SNY		American	W 64–51	5–6	OceanFirst Bank Center (731); West Long Branch, NJ
CAA regular season
January 3, 2025; 7:00 p.m., FloHoops/SNY/NBCSP		Hofstra	L 67–75	5–7 (0–1)	OceanFirst Bank Center (618); West Long Branch, NJ
January 5, 2025; 2:00 p.m., FloHoops		Stony Brook	W 75–61	6–7 (1–1)	OceanFirst Bank Center (711); West Long Branch, NJ
January 10, 2025; 2:00 p.m., FloHoops		at Towson	W 56–54	7–7 (2–1)	SECU Arena (850); Towson, MD
January 12, 2025; 2:00 p.m., FloHoops/SNY/NBCSP		William & Mary	L 74–83	7–8 (2–2)	OceanFirst Bank Center (686); West Long Branch, NJ
January 17, 2025; 7:00 p.m., FloHoops		at Charleston	W 59–55	8–8 (3–2)	TD Arena (372); Charleston, SC
January 19, 2025; 1:00 p.m., FloHoops		at UNC Wilmington	L 77–80 ^{OT}	8–9 (3–3)	Trask Coliseum (817); Wilmington, NC
January 24, 2025; 7:00 p.m., FloHoops		North Carolina A&T	W 54–49	9–9 (4–3)	OceanFirst Bank Center (687); West Long Branch, NJ
January 26, 2025; 2:00 p.m., FloHoops/SNY		Northeastern	W 69–46	10–9 (5–3)	OceanFirst Bank Center (797); West Long Branch, NJ
January 31, 2025; 7:00 p.m., FloHoops		at Campbell	L 67–76	10–10 (5–4)	Gore Arena (879); Buies Creek, NC
February 2, 2025; 1:00 p.m., FloHoops		at Elon	W 62–47	11–10 (6–4)	Schar Center (763); Elon, NC
February 7, 2025; 7:00 p.m., FloHoops		Drexel	W 50–47	12–10 (7–4)	OceanFirst Bank Center (633); West Long Branch, NJ
February 14, 2025; 6:30 p.m., FloHoops		at Delaware	L 61–70	12–11 (7–5)	Bob Carpenter Center (792); Newark, DE
February 16, 2025; 2:00 p.m., FloHoops/SNY		Hampton	W 62–60	13–11 (8–5)	OceanFirst Bank Center (1,979); West Long Branch, NJ
February 23, 2025; 2:00 p.m., FloHoops/MSG		at Hofstra	L 54–57	13–12 (8–6)	Mack Sports Complex (610); Hempstead, NY
February 28, 2025; 6:00 p.m., FloHoops		at Drexel	L 65–75	13–13 (8–7)	Daskalakis Athletic Center (517); Philadelphia, PA
March 2, 2025; 1:00 p.m., FloHoops/SNY		at Stony Brook	W 63–56	14–13 (9–7)	Stony Brook Arena (663); Stony Brook, NY
March 6, 2025; 7:00 p.m., FloHoops/SNY		Towson	W 82–56	15–13 (10–7)	OceanFirst Bank Center (634); West Long Branch, NJ
March 8, 2025; 2:00 p.m., FloHoops/SNY		Elon	L 54–70	15–14 (10–8)	OceanFirst Bank Center (1,046); West Long Branch, NJ
CAA tournament
March 13, 2025; 2:30 pm, FloHoops	(5)	vs. (13) Hampton; Second Round	W 62–54	16–14	CareFirst Arena (300); Washington, D.C.
March 14, 2025; 2:30 pm, FloHoops	(5)	vs. (4) Drexel; Quarterfinals	L 67–70 ^{OT}	16–15	CareFirst Arena (500); Washington, D.C.
*Non-conference game. ^{#}Rankings from AP poll. (#) Tournament seedings in parentheses. All times are in Eastern.
