= 2024–25 Hofstra Pride women's basketball team =

American college basketball season

2024–25 Hofstra Pride women's basketball
- Conference: Coastal Athletic Association
- Record: 9–9 (4–3 CAA)
- Head coach: Danielle Santos Atkinson (6th season)
- Associate head coach: Lance White
- Assistant coaches: Jessica Bogia; Amber Reeves; Maniya Custis
- Home arena: Mack Sports Complex

2024–25 CAA women's basketball standings
	Conf.				Overall
Team	W		L	PCT	W		L	PCT
North Carolina A&T	15	–	3	.833	19	–	12	.613
Charleston	14	–	4	.778	25	–	8	.758
Campbell	12	–	6	.667	22	–	13	.629
Drexel	12	–	6	.667	17	–	13	.567
Monmouth	10	–	8	.556	16	–	15	.516
Elon	9	–	9	.500	15	–	15	.500
Delaware	9	–	9	.500	13	–	17	.433
Hofstra	9	–	9	.500	14	–	16	.467
William & Mary †	8	–	10	.444	16	–	19	.457
UNC Wilmington	8	–	10	.444	14	–	18	.438
Towson	8	–	10	.444	12	–	20	.375
Stony Brook	7	–	11	.389	12	–	18	.400
Hampton	3	–	15	.167	8	–	23	.258
Northeastern	2	–	16	.111	3	–	25	.107
† 2025 CAA tournament winner

The 2024–25 Hofstra Pride women's basketball team represented Hofstra University during the 2024–25 NCAA Division I women's basketball season. The Pride, led by sixth-year head coach Danielle Santos Atkinson, played their home games at the Mack Sports Complex in Hempstead, New York, as members of the Coastal Athletic Association.

== Previous season ==
The Pride finished the 2023–24 season 11–21, 3–15 in CAA play, to finish in a three-way tie for 12th place. They defeated Hampton, and upset William & Mary, before falling to North Carolina A&T in the quarterfinals of the CAA tournament.

== Roster ==
2024–25 Hofstra Pride women's basketball team
Players
Coaches

Pos.	#	Name	Height	Year	Previous school	Hometown
G	1	Maddie Pounds	5 ft 8 in (1.73 m)	Fr	N.C. Good Better Best Academy	Rocky Mount, North Carolina
G	2	Emma Von Essen	5 ft 9 in (1.75 m)	Jr	Long Island Lutheran High School	Rockville Centre, New York
G	3	Chloe Sterling	5 ft 7 in (1.7 m)	Jr	James Madison	Kennesaw, Georgia
G	4	Sabrina Larsson	5 ft 8 in (1.73 m)	Jr	Independence Community College	Uppsala, Sweden
F	5	LaNae' Corbett	6 ft 0 in (1.83 m)	Fr	Bishop McNamara High School	Upper Marlboro, Maryland
F	6	Ayen Angoi	5 ft 11 in (1.8 m)	Jr	Louisiana Tech	Lavon, Texas
G/F	8	Ema Karim	5 ft 10 in (1.78 m)	Fr	Amelia Rey Colaço Escola	Paredes, Portugal
PG	10	Alarice Gooden	5 ft 7 in (1.7 m)	Jr	J. Addison School	Brampton, Ontario
F	12	Ramatoulaye Keita	5 ft 11 in (1.8 m)	GS	Gardner–Webb	Bamako, Mali
C	13	Zyheima Swint	6 ft 3 in (1.91 m)	GS	University High School	Newark, New Jersey
G	15	Janaia Fargo	5 ft 8 in (1.73 m)	GS	Charleston Southern	Inwood, West Virginia
G	22	Kassidy Thompson	5 ft 10 in (1.78 m)	So	Quinnipiac	Mullica Hill, New Jersey
G	25	Micaela Carter	5 ft 6 in (1.68 m)	So	St. Mary Catholic Secondary School	Brampton, Ontario
F/C	32	Michaela Hodge	6 ft 3 in (1.91 m)	Fr	Northampton County High School	Jackson, North Carolina

Head coach

- Danielle Santos Atkinson (Florida)

Assistant coach(es)

- Lance White (Texas Tech)
- Jessica Bogia (Lafayette)
- Amber Reeves (UNC Wilmington)
- Maniya Custis (Hofstra)

Legend

- (C) Team captain
- (S) Suspended
- (I) Ineligible
- (W) Walk-on
- Injured
- Current redshirt

Roster
Last update: January 26, 2025

== Schedule and results ==
Date time, TV	Rank^{#}	Opponent^{#}	Result	Record	Site (attendance) city, state
Non-conference regular season
November 4, 2024*; 7:30 pm, FloHoops/MSG2		Sacred Heart	L 58–63	0–1	Mack Sports Complex (1,543); Hempstead, NY
November 8, 2024*; 6:00 pm, ESPN+		at NJIT	W 74–69	1–1	Wellness and Events Center (325); Newark, NJ
November 12, 2024*; 5:00 pm, FloHoops		Yale	W 75–61	2–1	Mack Sports Complex (464); Hempstead, NY
November 17, 2024*; 5:00 pm, ESPN+		at Manhattan	L 49–62	2–2	Draddy Gymnasium (174); Riverdale, NY
November 22, 2024*; 6:00 pm, ESPN+		at Lehigh	L 61–80	2–3	Stabler Arena (488); Bethlehem, PA
November 30, 2024*; 2:00 pm, ESPN+		at Jacksonville	L 70–84	2–4	Swisher Gymnasium (300); Jacksonville, FL
December 2, 2024*; 7:00 pm, SECN+		at Florida	L 48–75	2–5	O'Connell Center (1,322); Gainesville, FL
December 8, 2024*; 2:00 pm, FloHoops		Howard	W 55–52	3–5	Mack Sports Complex (769); Hempstead, NY
December 11, 2024*; 6:00 pm, FloHoops/MSG		St. John's	L 38–62	3–6	Mack Sports Complex (622); Hempstead, NY
December 21, 2024*; 2:00 pm, ESPN+		at Bucknell	W 76–71 ^{OT}	4–6	Sojka Pavilion (247); Lewisburg, PA
December 29, 2024*; 2:00 pm, FloHoops/MSGSN		Iona	W 59–43	5–6	Mack Sports Complex (702); Hempstead, NY
CAA regular season
January 3, 2025; 7:00 pm, FloHoops		at Monmouth	W 75–67	6–6 (1–0)	OceanFirst Bank Center (618); West Long Branch, NJ
January 5, 2025; 2:00 pm, FloHoops		at Delaware	W 63–57	7–6 (2–0)	Bob Carpenter Center (954); Newark, DE
January 10, 2025; 6:00 pm, FloHoops		Charleston	L 51–64	7–7 (2–1)	Mack Sports Complex (537); Hempstead, NY
January 12, 2025; 2:00 pm, FloHoops/MSG2		Drexel	W 60–53	8–7 (3–1)	Mack Sports Complex (739); Hempstead, NY
January 19, 2025; 1:00 pm, FloHoops		at Elon	L 51–70	8–8 (3–2)	Schar Center (757); Elon, NC
January 24, 2025; 6:00 pm, FloHoops		Campbell	W 55–47	9–8 (4–2)	Mack Sports Complex (509); Hempstead, NY
January 26, 2025; 1:00 pm, FloHoops		North Carolina A&T	L 44–63	9–9 (4–3)	Mack Sports Complex (693); Hempstead, NY
January 31, 2025; 7:00 pm, FloHoops		at UNC Wilmington			Trask Coliseum; Wilmington, NC
February 2, 2025; 2:00 pm, FloHoops		at Charleston			TD Arena; Charleston, SC
February 7, 2025; 7:00 pm, FloHoops		at Stony Brook; Battle of Long Island			Stony Brook Arena; Stony Brook, NY
February 9, 2025; 2:00 pm, FloHoops/MSG		Delaware			Mack Sports Complex; Hempstead, NY
February 14, 2025; 6:00 pm, FloHoops/MSG		Towson			Mack Sports Complex; Hempstead, NY
February 16, 2025; 1:00 pm, FloHoops		at Northeastern			Cabot Center; Boston, MA
February 23, 2025; 2:00 pm, FloHoops/MSG		Monmouth			Mack Sports Complex; Hempstead, NY
February 28, 2025; 7:00 pm, FloHoops		at Hampton			Hampton Convocation Center; Hampton, VA
March 2, 2025; 1:00 pm, FloHoops		at William & Mary			Kaplan Arena; Williamsburg, VA
March 6, 2025; 6:00 pm, FloHoops/MSG		Stony Brook; Battle of Long Island			Mack Sports Complex; Hempstead, NY
March 8, 2025; 2:00 pm, FloHoops/MSGSN		Northeastern			Mack Sports Complex; Hempstead, NY
CAA tournament
March 12–16, 2025; FloHoops		vs.			Entertainment and Sports Arena; Washington, D.C.
*Non-conference game. ^{#}Rankings from AP Poll. (#) Tournament seedings in parentheses. All times are in Eastern.
