= 2024–25 Towson Tigers women's basketball team =

American college basketball season

2024–25 Towson Tigers women's basketball
- Conference: Coastal Athletic Association
- Record: 12–20 (8–10 CAA)
- Head coach: Laura Harper (3rd season)
- Assistant coaches: Eric Atkins; Ka'lia Johnson; Lorie Khalil; Zion Sanders
- Home arena: TU Arena

2024–25 CAA women's basketball standings
| | Conf. | | | | Overall |
| Team | W | | L | PCT | W | | L | PCT |
|---|---|---|---|---|---|---|---|---|
| North Carolina A&T | 15 | – | 3 | .833 | 19 | – | 12 | .613 |
| Charleston | 14 | – | 4 | .778 | 25 | – | 8 | .758 |
| Campbell | 12 | – | 6 | .667 | 22 | – | 13 | .629 |
| Drexel | 12 | – | 6 | .667 | 17 | – | 13 | .567 |
| Monmouth | 10 | – | 8 | .556 | 16 | – | 15 | .516 |
| Elon | 9 | – | 9 | .500 | 15 | – | 15 | .500 |
| Delaware | 9 | – | 9 | .500 | 13 | – | 17 | .433 |
| Hofstra | 9 | – | 9 | .500 | 14 | – | 16 | .467 |
| William & Mary † | 8 | – | 10 | .444 | 16 | – | 19 | .457 |
| UNC Wilmington | 8 | – | 10 | .444 | 14 | – | 18 | .438 |
| Towson | 8 | – | 10 | .444 | 12 | – | 20 | .375 |
| Stony Brook | 7 | – | 11 | .389 | 12 | – | 18 | .400 |
| Hampton | 3 | – | 15 | .167 | 8 | – | 23 | .258 |
| Northeastern | 2 | – | 16 | .111 | 3 | – | 25 | .107 |
† 2025 CAA tournament winner

The 2024–25 Towson Tigers women's basketball team represented Towson University during the 2024–25 NCAA Division I women's basketball season. The Tigers, led by third-year head coach Laura Harper, played their home games at TU Arena in Towson, Maryland as members of the Coastal Athletic Association.

== Previous season ==
The Tigers finished the 2023–24 season 20–11, 11–7 in CAA play, to finish in sixth place. They defeated Northeastern, and Charleston, before falling to eventual tournament champions Drexel in the semifinals of the CAA tournament.

== Roster ==
2024–25 Towson Tigers women's basketball team
Players
Coaches

| Pos. | # | Name | Height | Year | Previous school | Hometown |
|---|---|---|---|---|---|---|
| G | 0 | Masyn Marchbanks | 5 ft 8 in (1.73 m) | Jr | Samford | Hartselle, Alabama |
| G | 1 | Semaya Turner | 5 ft 11 in (1.8 m) | Jr | Saint Francis (PA) | Rockaway, New Jersey |
| G | 2 | India Johnston | 5 ft 8 in (1.73 m) | Jr | Caravel Academy | Bear, Delaware |
| F | 3 | Anasia Staton | 6 ft 0 in (1.83 m) | Sr | CCBC Essex | Jersey City, New Jersey |
| G | 4 | Shariah Baynes | 5 ft 6 in (1.68 m) | Fr | Paul VI High School | Philadelphia, Pennsylvania |
| F | 5 | Kayla Morris | 6 ft 2 in (1.88 m) | RS Jr | Cal State Bakersfield | Harlem, New York |
| F | 6 | Khady Leye | 6 ft 2 in (1.88 m) | Fr | SPIRE Academy | Louga, Senegal |
| G | 7 | Aminata Diakite | 5 ft 8 in (1.73 m) | RS Sr | Salt Lake Community College | Bamako, Mali |
| G | 8 | Patricia Anumgba | 5 ft 7 in (1.7 m) | Sr | CCBC Essex | Silver Spring, Maryland |
| F | 9 | Caydence Hadley | 6 ft 1 in (1.85 m) | So | Bishop Kearney High School | Rochester, New York |
| G | 11 | Jordan Wakefield | 6 ft 0 in (1.83 m) | GS | George Mason | Bel Air, Maryland |
| F | 22 | Anaiah Jenkins | 5 ft 11 in (1.8 m) | So | McDonogh School | Odenton, Maryland |
| F | 31 | Deja Bristol | 6 ft 0 in (1.83 m) | GS | Northeastern | Upper Marlboro, Maryland |

Head coach

- Laura Harper (Maryland)

Assistant coach(es)

- Eric Atkins (Notre Dame)
- Ka'lia Johnson (Duke)
- Lorie Khalil (Moravian)
- Zion Sanders (Iowa)

Legend

- (C) Team captain
- (S) Suspended
- (I) Ineligible
- (W) Walk-on
- Injured
- Current redshirt

Roster
Last update: January 28, 2025

== Schedule and results ==
| Date time, TV | Rank^{#} | Opponent^{#} | Result | Record | Site (attendance) city, state |
Exhibition
| October 27, 2024*; 4:00 pm | | Frostburg State | W 79–60 | – | TU Arena; Towson, MD |
Non-conference regular season
| November 5, 2024*; 7:00 pm, ESPN+ | | at No. 16 West Virginia | L 41–85 | 0–1 | WVU Coliseum (2,079); Morgantown, WV |
| November 9, 2024*; 3:00 pm, ESPN+ | | at George Mason | L 55–76 | 0–2 | EagleBank Arena (1,107); Fairfax, VA |
| November 14, 2024*; 5:30 pm | | at Morgan State | L 63–64 | 0–3 | Hill Field House (1,957); Baltimore, MD |
| November 17, 2024*; 11:00 am, B1G+ | | at No. 11 Maryland | L 63–98 | 0–4 | Xfinity Center (5,108); College Park, MD |
| November 20, 2024*; 6:00 pm, Monumental/ESPN+ | | at George Washington | L 57–69 | 0–5 | Charles E. Smith Center (506); Washington, D.C. |
| November 24, 2024*; 1:00 pm, Monumental/FloHoops | | Liberty | L 57–64 | 0–6 | TU Arena (425); Towson, MD |
| November 29, 2024*; 2:00 pm | | vs. UTSA; Puerto Rico Clásico | L 40–71 | 0–7 | Juan Cruz Abreu Coliseum (100); Manatí, PR |
| November 30, 2024*; 1:30 pm | | vs. Youngstown State; Puerto Rico Clásico | W 68–57 | 1–7 | Juan Cruz Abreu Coliseum (100); Manatí, PR |
| December 4, 2024*; 11:00 am, Monumental/FloHoops | | UMBC | L 60–65 | 1–8 | TU Arena (3,590); Towson, MD |
| December 7, 2024*; 3:30 pm, FloHoops | | American | W 89–62 | 2–8 | TU Arena (325); Towson, MD |
| December 29, 2024*; 1:00 pm, Monumental/FloHoops | | Columbia | L 53–73 | 2–9 | TU Arena (475); Towson, MD |
CAA regular season
| January 3, 2025; 7:00 pm, FloHoops | | at Charleston | L 50–67 | 2–10 (0–1) | TD Arena (411); Charleston, SC |
| January 5, 2025; 1:00 pm, FloHoops | | at UNC Wilmington | W 70–69 | 3–10 (1–1) | Trask Coliseum (618); Wilmington, NC |
| January 10, 2025; 2:00 pm, FloHoops | | Monmouth | L 54–56 | 3–11 (1–2) | TU Arena (850); Towson, MD |
| January 12, 2025; 2:00 pm, FloHoops | | North Carolina A&T | L 59–61 | 3–12 (1–3) | TU Arena (540); Towson, MD |
| January 17, 2025; 6:00 pm, Monumental/FloHoops | | Northeastern | W 79–43 | 4–12 (2–3) | TU Arena (318); Towson, MD |
| January 24, 2025; 7:00 pm, FloHoops | | at Hampton | L 58–61 | 4–13 (2–4) | Hampton Convocation Center (352); Hampton, VA |
| January 26, 2025; 1:00 pm, FloHoops | | at William & Mary | L 47–58 | 4–14 (2–5) | Kaplan Arena (1,009); Williamsburg, VA |
| January 31, 2025; 6:30 pm, FloHoops | | Delaware | | | TU Arena; Towson, MD |
| February 2, 2025; 2:00 pm, FloHoops | | at Drexel | | | Daskalakis Athletic Center; Philadelphia, PA |
| February 7, 2025; 6:30 pm, FloHoops | | Hampton | | | TU Arena; Towson, MD |
| February 9, 2025; 1:00 pm, FloHoops | | Elon | | | TU Arena; Towson, MD |
| February 14, 2025; 6:00 pm, FloHoops | | at Hofstra | | | Mack Sports Complex; Hempstead, NY |
| February 16, 2025; 2:00 pm, Monumental/FloHoops | | Stony Brook | | | TU Arena; Towson, MD |
| February 21, 2025; 7:00 pm, FloHoops | | at Northeastern | | | Cabot Center; Boston, MA |
| February 23, 2025; 2:00 pm, FloHoops | | UNC Wilmington | | | TU Arena; Towson, MD |
| February 28, 2025; 6:00 pm, Monumental/FloHoops | | Campbell | | | TU Arena; Towson, MD |
| March 6, 2025; 7:00 pm, FloHoops | | at Monmouth | | | OceanFirst Bank Center; West Long Branch, NJ |
| March 8, 2025; 3:00 pm, FloHoops | | at Delaware | | | Bob Carpenter Center; Newark, DE |
CAA tournament
| March 12–16, 2025; FloHoops | | vs. | | | Entertainment and Sports Arena; Washington, D.C. |
*Non-conference game. ^{#}Rankings from AP Poll. (#) Tournament seedings in parentheses. All times are in Eastern.
