= 2025 CAA women's basketball tournament =

U.S. collegiate basketball event

- Classification: Division I
- Season: 2024–25
- Teams: 14
- Site: CareFirst Arena; Washington, D.C.
- Champions: William & Mary (1st title)
- Winning coach: Erin Dickerson Davis (1st title)
- MVP: Bella Nascimento (William & Mary)
- Television: FloHoops, CBSSN
- CAA women's basketball tournaments

2024–25 CAA women's basketball standings
	Conf.				Overall
Team	W		L	PCT	W		L	PCT
North Carolina A&T	15	–	3	.833	19	–	12	.613
Charleston	14	–	4	.778	25	–	8	.758
Campbell	12	–	6	.667	22	–	13	.629
Drexel	12	–	6	.667	17	–	13	.567
Monmouth	10	–	8	.556	16	–	15	.516
Elon	9	–	9	.500	15	–	15	.500
Delaware	9	–	9	.500	13	–	17	.433
Hofstra	9	–	9	.500	14	–	16	.467
William & Mary †	8	–	10	.444	16	–	19	.457
UNC Wilmington	8	–	10	.444	14	–	18	.438
Towson	8	–	10	.444	12	–	20	.375
Stony Brook	7	–	11	.389	12	–	18	.400
Hampton	3	–	15	.167	8	–	23	.258
Northeastern	2	–	16	.111	3	–	25	.107
† 2025 CAA tournament winner

The 2025 Coastal Athletic Association women's basketball tournament will be the postseason women's college basketball tournament for the Coastal Athletic Association for the 2024–25 NCAA Division I women's basketball season. The tournament was held from March 12-16, 2025, at the Entertainment and Sports Arena in Washington, D.C. By winning four games in four days, William & Mary received the conference's automatic bid to the 2025 NCAA tournament by winning the tournament, becoming the lowest seed (9th) to reach and win the tournament final. It was the first time in William & Mary's history, for both the women's or men's teams, to make the NCAA Tournament.

== Seeds ==
All 14 CAA teams participated in the tournament. Teams were seeded by record within the conference, with a tiebreaker system to seed teams with identical conference records. The top 10 teams received a first round bye and the top four teams received a double bye, automatically advancing them into the quarterfinals.

Seed	School	Conf.	Tiebreaker
1	North Carolina A&T	15–3	
2	Charleston	14–4	
3	Campbell	12–6	1–0 vs. North Carolina A&T
4	Drexel	12–6	0–1 vs. North Carolina A&T
5	Monmouth	10–8	
6	Elon	9–9	2–1 vs. Delaware/Hofstra
7	Delaware	9–9	2–2 vs. Elon/Hofstra
8	Hofstra	9–9	1–2 vs. Elon/Delaware
9	William & Mary	8–10	2–0 vs. UNC Wilmington/Towson
10	UNC Wilmington	8–10	1–1 vs. Campbell
11	Towson	8–10	0–1 vs. Campbell
12	Stony Brook	7–11	
13	Hampton	3–15	
14	Northeastern	2–16	

== Schedule ==
Session	Game	Time*	Matchup	Score	Television
First Round – Wednesday, March 12
1	1	2:00 pm	No. 12 Stony Brook vs. No. 13 Hampton	75–76	FloHoops
1	2	4:30 pm	No. 11 Towson vs. No. 14 Northeastern	67–44	FloHoops
Second Round – Thursday, March 13
2	3	12:00 pm	No. 8 Hofstra vs. No. 9 William & Mary	65–76	FloHoops
2	4	2:30 pm	No. 5 Monmouth vs. No. 13 Hampton	62–54	FloHoops
3	5	6:00 pm	No. 7 Delaware vs. No. 10 UNC Wilmington	71–55	FloHoops
3	6	8:30 pm	No. 6 Elon vs. No. 11 Towson	47–53	FloHoops
Quarterfinals – Friday, March 14
4	7	12:00 pm	No. 1 North Carolina A&T vs. No. 9 William & Mary	66–74^{OT}	FloHoops
4	8	2:30 pm	No. 4 Drexel vs. No. 5 Monmouth	70–67^{OT}	FloHoops
5	9	6:00 pm	No. 2 Charleston vs. No. 7 Delaware	87–49	FloHoops
5	10	8:30 pm	No. 3 Campbell vs. No. 11 Towson	73–54	FloHoops
Semifinals – Saturday, March 15
6	11	2:00 pm	No. 4 Drexel vs. No. 9 William & Mary	54–76	FloHoops
6	12	4:30 pm	No. 2 Charleston vs. No. 3 Campbell	59–80	FloHoops
Championship – Sunday, March 16
7	13	2:00 pm	No. 9 William & Mary vs. No. 3 Campbell	66–63	CBSSN
*Game times in EST for the first and second rounds and EDT from the quarterfinals onward. Rankings denote tournament seed.

== Bracket ==
First Round; Wednesday, March 12; FloHoops
12	Stony Brook	75
13	Hampton	76
11	Towson	67
14	Northeastern	44

Second Round; Thursday, March 13; FloHoops
8	Hofstra	65
9	William & Mary	76
5	Monmouth	62
13	Hampton	54
7	Delaware	71
10	UNC Wilmington	55
6	Elon	47
11	Towson	53

Quarterfinals; Friday, March 14; FloHoops
1	North Carolina A&T	66
9	William & Mary	74*
4	Drexel	70*
5	Monmouth	67
2	Charleston	87
7	Delaware	49
3	Campbell	73
11	Towson	54

Semifinals; Saturday, March 15; FloHoops
9	William & Mary	76
4	Drexel	54
2	Charleston	59
3	Campbell	80

Championship; Sunday, March 16; CBS Sports Network
9	William & Mary	66
3	Campbell	63

* denotes number of overtime periods

== Honors ==
CAA All-Tournament Team
Player	School
Taryn Barbot	Charleston
Courtney Dahlquist	Campbell
Monet Dance	William & Mary
Cassidy Geddes	William & Mary
Gemma Nunez	Campbell
Bella Nascimento (MOP)	William & Mary

== See also ==
- 2025 CAA men's basketball tournament
