= Cambridge House Community College =

Coordinates: 39.53934°N 0.42125°W

Cambridge House British International School is a British international school in Valencia, Spain.

In September 2021 Cambridge House British International School joined Globeducate, one of the world's groups of international schools.

In the year 2023, the school's name was changed. From CHCC (Cambridge House Community College), to Cambridge House British International School.

== History ==
Tracy Ibberson established the school in 1986. The school initially had 10 students.

The school has been sold to the community of Globeducate, a group of schools that unite many schools from different countries.

== Student body ==
As of 2010 the school had 1,200 students, most of whom came from Spanish families. 150 students came from British families. Cambridge House mainly caters to Spanish families.

== See also ==
- Instituto Español Vicente Cañada Blanch - Spanish international school in London
- British immigration in Spain
