= Joy McCorvey =

American college basketball coach

Current position
- Title: Head coach
- Team: Stony Brook
- Conference: CAA
- Record: 30–33 (.476)

Biographical details
- Born: July 15, 1988 (age 38); Brewton, Alabama, U.S.

Playing career
- 2006–2010: St. John's
- Position: Power forward

Coaching career (HC unless noted)
- 2011–2012: St. John's (assistant)
- 2012–2018: Michigan (assistant)
- 2018–2021: Florida State (assistant)
- 2021–2024: Tennessee (assistant)
- 2024–present: Stony Brook

Head coaching record
- Overall: 30–33 (.476)

Joy McCorvey (born July 15, 1988) is an American college basketball coach who is currently the head coach of the Stony Brook Seawolves women's basketball team.

== Early life ==
McCorvey was raised in Brewton, Alabama, a small town with a population over 5,000 people. She attended T. R. Miller High School, where she played on the basketball team and graduated in 2006. McCorvey was a top-three finalist for The Birmingham News' Miss Basketball Award, and was chosen for the Mississippi/Alabama All-Star Game.

== Playing career ==
McCorvey played college basketball at St. John's University in New York City for head coach Kim Barnes Arico from 2006 to 2010. A four-year captain, she became one of four players in St. John's history to record both 700 career points and 700 career rebounds. She recorded 777 rebounds, third-most in program history.

McCorvey graduated in 2010 with a bachelor's degree in child education.

== Coaching career ==
McCorvey began her coaching career as an assistant under former head coach Kim Barnes Arico at her alma mater St. John's. When Arico accepted the head coach job at Michigan, McCorvey followed her to Ann Arbor, where she remained an assistant until 2018. In May 2018, McCorvey became an assistant coach at Florida State under Sue Semrau. She was Florida State's lead recruiter before departing in April 2021 to join Kellie Harper's staff for the Tennessee Lady Volunteers. On April 1, 2024, Harper was fired and McCorvey was not retained as an assistant. That season, she was named by The Athletic as one of the top 20 assistant coaches in women's college basketball for a future head coaching position, having been a part of seven NCAA Tournaments and eleven 20-win seasons in 13 years as an assistant.

On April 15, 2024, McCorvey earned her first head coaching job when she was officially named as Stony Brook's new head coach.

== Head coaching record ==
Record table
Season	Team	Overall	Conference	Standing	Postseason
Stony Brook (CAA) (2024–present)
2024–25	Stony Brook	12–18	7–11	12th	
2025–26	Stony Brook	18–15	12–6	T–4th	
Stony Brook:		30–33 (.476)	19–17 (.528)		
Total:		30–33 (.476)			
National champion Postseason invitational champion Conference regular season champion Conference regular season and conference tournament champion Division regular season champion Division regular season and conference tournament champion Conference tournament champion
