= Corbett Sports Center =

Arena in Greensboro, North Carolina, US

Ellis F. Corbett Sports Center
- The Dawg Pound
- Corbett Sports Center, from the rear
- Interactive map of Ellis F. Corbett Sports Center
- Full name: Ellis F. Corbett Health, Physical Education and Recreation Center
- Location: 1601 East Market Street; Greensboro, NC 27411
- Coordinates: 36.076783°N 79.768849°W
- Owner: North Carolina Agricultural & Technical State University
- Operator: North Carolina A&T State University
- Capacity: 5,000
- Surface: Hardwood

Construction
- Groundbreaking: 1976
- Opened: December 3, 1978
- Renovated: 2003, 2005

Tenants
- North Carolina A&T Aggies (NCAA); Men's basketball (1978–present); Women's basketball (1978–present); Women's swimming (1978–present); Women's volleyball (1978–present)

The Ellis F. Corbett Health, Physical Education and Recreation Center, usually called simply the Corbett Sports Center and popularly referred to as the "Dawg Pound", is a multi-purpose arena in Greensboro, North Carolina, United States, on the campus of North Carolina Agricultural and Technical State University. The complex is home to multiple North Carolina A&T Aggies athletic teams, including the men's and women's basketball teams as well as the women's volleyball and swimming teams. The complex, opened in 1978, is named after Ellis F. Corbett, a 1931 graduate of A&T. Affectionately known as "Mr.A&T", Corbett was, for many years, the director of public relations and executive secretary of the national alumni association.

== General Information ==
The three-story complex houses office space, classrooms, two racquetball courts in addition to an Olympic sized swimming pool. In 2005, The basketball court was named the Cal Irvin-Don Corbett basketball court after two of the most Notable coaches in Aggie history. Irwin's legacy stems from his 18-season run as the Aggies Basketball coach. During his tenure, the Aggies never finished below .500. Irvin’s success would carry the Aggies over from the Central Intercollegiate Athletic Association (CIAA) into the Mid-Eastern Athletic Conference, where he won the school’s first league championship in 1972. Irvin's held a 308-105 record as coach of the Aggies. His first CIAA championship came in 1958. Irvin’s teams won CIAA titles in 1959,1962, 1964, and 1967.

=== Home court advantage ===
Corbett Sports Center was chosen in 2010 by ESPN columnist Kyle Whelliston as one of his favorite arena atmospheres. Additionally, Corbett Sports Center was ranked the 14th best atmosphere in the nation in an espn.com fan poll. North Carolina A&T had the distinction of being the only Historically Black College and University school in the poll, and in 2007 they had three games nationally-televised on ESPNU.

=== Non-basketball events ===
The Aggies host their home swim meets inside the Corbett Sports Center Natatorium. Renovated in 2003, the Natatorium has played host to the Historically Black College and University (HBCU) Swim Meet, which the Aggies have claimed the last four meet wins. The HBCU Swim Meet is a three team meet which features North Carolina A&T, along with fellow Mid-Eastern Athletic Conference institutions Howard University, and Florida A&M.

== See also ==
- List of NCAA Division I basketball arenas
