= Coastal Athletic Association women's basketball tournament =

Basketball tournament

CAA women's basketball tournament
- Conference basketball championship
- Sport: College basketball
- Conference: Coastal Athletic Association
- Number of teams: 13
- Format: Single-elimination tournament
- Current stadium: Entertainment & Sports Arena
- Current location: Washington, DC
- Played: 1984–present
- Last contest: 2025
- Current champion: Charleston (1st)
- Most championships: Old Dominion (17)
- TV partner: NBC Sports Regional Networks
- Official website: CAASports.com Women's Basketball

Host stadiums
- Kaplan Arena (1985, 1989, 2025) Entertainment & Sports Arena (2024); SECU Arena (2023); Daskalakis Athletic Center (2018, 2022); Schar Center (2021); Bob Carpenter Center (2007–08, 2019); JMU Convocation Center (1987, 1991, 1994, 2009–10, 2017); The Show Place Arena (2011–16); Patriot Center (2005–06); Ted Constant Convocation Center (2003–04); ODU Fieldhouse (1992–93, 1995–96, 2001–02); ALLTEL Pavilion (2000); Robins Center (1990, 1999); Richmond Coliseum (1997–98); Bender Arena (1988); Trask Coliseum (1986) Minges Coliseum (1984)

Host locations
- Williamsburg, VA (1985, 1989) Washington, DC (2024); Towson, MD (2023); Philadelphia, PA (2018, 2022); Elon, NC (2021); Newark, DE (2007–08, 2019); Harrisonburg, VA (1987, 1991, 1994, 2009–10, 2017); Upper Marlboro, MD (2011–16); Fairfax, VA (2005–06); Norfolk, VA (1992–93, 1995–96, 2001–04); Richmond, VA (1990, 1997–2000); Washington, DC (1988); Wilmington, NC (1986) Greenville, NC (1984)

The Coastal Athletic Association women's basketball tournament (formerly known as the Colonial Athletic Association) has been held every year since 1984. The winner receives an automatic berth into the NCAA Division I Women's Basketball Championship.

== Tournament champions ==
Year	Champion	Score	Runner-up	Location
1984	East Carolina	54–39	Richmond	Minges Coliseum (Greenville, NC)
1985	East Carolina	65–59	James Madison	William & Mary Hall (Williamsburg, VA)
1986	James Madison	66–62	East Carolina	Trask Coliseum (Wilmington, NC)
1987	James Madison	74–62	American	JMU Convocation Center (Harrisonburg, VA)
1988	James Madison	87–72	George Mason	Bender Arena (Washington, DC)
1989	James Madison	55–45	Richmond	William & Mary Hall (Williamsburg, VA)
1990	Richmond	47–46	James Madison	JMU Convocation Center (Harrisonburg, VA)
1991	Richmond	88–70	East Carolina	JMU Convocation Center (Harrisonburg, VA)
1992	Old Dominion	80–75	East Carolina	Old Dominion University Fieldhouse (Norfolk, VA)
1993	Old Dominion	65–51	William & Mary	Old Dominion University Fieldhouse (Norfolk, VA)
1994	Old Dominion	78–61	George Mason	JMU Convocation Center (Harrisonburg, VA)
1995	Old Dominion	63–44	James Madison	Old Dominion University Fieldhouse (Norfolk, VA)
1996	Old Dominion	84–58	James Madison	Old Dominion University Fieldhouse (Norfolk, VA)
1997	Old Dominion	83–46	East Carolina	Richmond Coliseum (Richmond, VA)
1998	Old Dominion	82–49	American	Richmond Coliseum (Richmond, VA)
1999	Old Dominion	73–67	East Carolina	Richmond Coliseum (Richmond, VA)
2000	Old Dominion	92–49	UNC Wilmington	ALLTEL Pavilion (Richmond, VA)
2001	Old Dominion	66–62	James Madison	Old Dominion University Fieldhouse (Norfolk, VA)
2002	Old Dominion	76–48	UNC Wilmington	Old Dominion University Fieldhouse (Norfolk, VA)
2003	Old Dominion	66–58	Delaware	Ted Constant Convocation Center (Norfolk, VA)
2004	Old Dominion	85–81	George Mason	Ted Constant Convocation Center (Norfolk, VA)
2005	Old Dominion	78–74^{†}	Delaware	Patriot Center (Fairfax, VA)
2006	Old Dominion	58–54	James Madison	Patriot Center (Fairfax, VA)
2007	Old Dominion	78–70	James Madison	Bob Carpenter Center (Newark, DE)
2008	Old Dominion	71–64	VCU	Bob Carpenter Center (Newark, DE)
2009	Drexel	64–58	James Madison	JMU Convocation Center (Harrisonburg, VA)
2010	James Madison	67–53	Old Dominion	JMU Convocation Center (Harrisonburg, VA)
2011	James Madison	67–61	Delaware	Show Place Arena (Upper Marlboro, MD)
2012	Delaware	59–43	Drexel	Show Place Arena (Upper Marlboro, MD)
2013	Delaware	59–56	Drexel	Show Place Arena (Upper Marlboro, MD)
2014	James Madison	70–45	Delaware	Show Place Arena (Upper Marlboro, MD)
2015	James Madison	62–56	Hofstra	Show Place Arena (Upper Marlboro, MD)
2016	James Madison	60–46	Drexel	Show Place Arena (Upper Marlboro, MD)
2017	Elon	78–60	James Madison	JMU Convocation Center (Harrisonburg, VA)
2018	Elon	57–45	Drexel	Daskalakis Athletic Center (Philadelphia, PA)
2019	Towson	53–49	Drexel	Bob Carpenter Center (Newark, DE)
2020	Canceled due to the COVID-19 pandemic			
2021	Drexel	63–52	Delaware	Schar Center (Elon, NC)
2022	Delaware	63–59	Drexel	Daskalakis Athletic Center (Philadelphia, PA)
2023	Monmouth	80–55	Towson	SECU Arena (Towson, MD)
2024	Drexel	68–60	Stony Brook	Entertainment & Sports Arena (Washington, DC)
2025	William & Mary	66–63	Campbell	Entertainment & Sports Arena (Washington, DC)
2026	Charleston	68–56	Hofstra	Entertainment & Sports Arena (Washington, DC)
2027				Entertainment & Sports Arena (Washington, DC)
2028				Entertainment & Sports Arena (Washington, DC)
2029				Entertainment & Sports Arena (Washington, DC)

†	Denotes game went into overtime

== Tournament championships by school ==
School	Championships	Championship Years
Old Dominion	17	1992, 1993, 1994, 1995, 1996, 1997, 1998, 1999, 2000, 2001, 2002, 2003, 2004, 2005, 2006, 2007, 2008
James Madison	9	1986, 1987, 1988, 1989, 2010, 2011, 2014, 2015, 2016
Delaware	3	2012, 2013, 2022
Drexel	3	2009, 2021, 2024
East Carolina	2	1984, 1985
Elon	2	2017, 2018
Richmond	2	1990, 1991
Charleston	1	2026
William & Mary	1	2025
Monmouth	1	2023
Towson	1	2019

- Schools highlighted in pink are former CAA members as of the current 2025–26 CAA season.

Among current teams, Campbell, Hampton, Hofstra, North Carolina A&T, Northeastern, Stony Brook, and UNC Wilmington have never won the tournament.

== See also ==
- Coastal Athletic Association men's basketball tournament
