= 2020–21 James Madison Dukes women's basketball team =

Intercollegiate basketball season

2020–21 James Madison Dukes women's basketball
- Conference: Colonial Athletic Association
- Record: 14–10 (9–6 CAA)
- Head coach: Sean O'Regan (5th season)
- Assistant coaches: Ashley Langford; Ian Caskill; Samantha Prahalis-Holmes
- Home arena: Atlantic Union Bank Center

2020–21 CAA women's basketball standings
| | Conf. | | | | Overall |
| Team | W | | L | PCT | W | | L | PCT |
|---|---|---|---|---|---|---|---|---|
| Delaware | 16 | – | 2 | .889 | 24 | – | 5 | .828 |
| James Madison | 9 | – | 6 | .600 | 14 | – | 10 | .583 |
| Drexel† | 8 | – | 6 | .571 | 14 | – | 9 | .609 |
| Towson | 8 | – | 6 | .571 | 13 | – | 9 | .591 |
| Hofstra | 5 | – | 7 | .417 | 8 | – | 12 | .400 |
| Elon | 3 | – | 5 | .375 | 7 | – | 8 | .467 |
| Northeastern | 6 | – | 10 | .375 | 7 | – | 13 | .350 |
| William & Mary | 3 | – | 5 | .375 | 6 | – | 7 | .462 |
| Charleston | 2 | – | 6 | .250 | 6 | – | 9 | .400 |
| UNC Wilmington | 3 | – | 10 | .231 | 7 | – | 14 | .333 |
† 2021 CAA tournament winner Rankings from AP poll

The 2020–21 James Madison Dukes women's basketball team represented James Madison University during the 2020–21 NCAA Division I women's basketball season. The Dukes, led by fifth-year head coach Sean O'Regan, played their home games at the Atlantic Union Bank Center as members of the Colonial Athletic Association (CAA). This was the first season the Dukes played their games at the new arena. They finished the season 14–10, 9–6 in CAA play. They received the number two seed in the CAA women's tournament and were eventually eliminated in the semifinal round of the tournament. They were not invited to any additional post-season play.

== Roster ==
2020–21 James Madison Dukes women's basketball team
Players
Coaches

| Pos. | # | Name | Height | Year | Previous school | Hometown |
|---|---|---|---|---|---|---|
| G | 0 | Nikki Oppenheimer (redshirt) | 5 ft 9 in (1.75 m) | Jr | Montini Catholic HS; Syracuse | Glenview, Illinois |
| F | 1 | Morgan Smith | 6 ft 0 in (1.83 m) | Sr | Riverdale Baptist; Georgetown | Upper Marlboro, Maryland |
| G | 2 | Jaylin Carodine | 5 ft 10 in (1.78 m) | Jr | St. John's College HS | Bowie, Maryland |
| G | 3 | Brianna Tinsley (redshirt) | 5 ft 7 in (1.7 m) | Jr | St. Anne's-Belfield; Virginia | Madison, Virginia |
| G | 4 | Madison Green | 5 ft 6 in (1.68 m) | Jr | Millbrook HS | Winchester, Virginia |
| G | 13 | Eleanore Marciszewski | 6 ft 0 in (1.83 m) | Jr | Dawson College | Sainte-Julie, Canada |
| F | 14 | Annalicia Goodman | 6 ft 3 in (1.91 m) | Fr | Heritage HS | Newport News, Virginia |
| F | 21 | Rayne Tucker | 6 ft 1 in (1.85 m) | So | Riverdale Baptist | New Carrollton, Maryland |
| G | 22 | Peyton McDaniel | 6 ft 0 in (1.83 m) | Fr | Twin Valley HS | Birdsboro, Pennsylvania |
| G | 24 | Anne Diouf | 6 ft 4 in (1.93 m) | Sr | IMG Academy; Georgia Tech | Dakar, Senegal |
| G | 30 | Kiki Jefferson | 6 ft 1 in (1.85 m) | So | Lancaster HS | Lancaster, Pennsylvania |
| F | 33 | Steph Ouderkirk | 6 ft 1 in (1.85 m) | Fr | Spotswood HS | Penn Laird, Virginia |
| F | 35 | Claire Neff | 6 ft 2 in (1.88 m) | Fr | Maryvale Prep | Bel Air, Maryland |
| F | 41 | Casey Irvine | 6 ft 1 in (1.85 m) | Jr | Spotswood HS | Penn Laird, Virginia |
| G | | Bailey Williams | 5 ft 7 in (1.7 m) | Fr | Cosby HS | Midlothian, Virginia |

Head coach

- Sean O'Regan (James Madison)

Assistant coach(es)

- Ashley Langford (Tulane)
- Ian Caskill (James Madison)
- Samantha Prahalis-Holmes (Ohio State)

Legend

- (C) Team captain
- (S) Suspended
- (I) Ineligible
- (W) Walk-on
- Injured
- Current redshirt

Roster
Last update: December 26, 2022

== Schedule and results ==
| Date time, TV | Rank^{#} | Opponent^{#} | Result | Record | High points | High rebounds | High assists | Site (attendance) city, state |
Non-conference regular season
| 11/26/2020*; 4:00 p.m., FloHoops | | Mount St. Mary's | W 69–55 | 1–0 | 18 – Hazell | 18 – Tucker | 3 – Hazell | Atlantic Union Bank Center; Harrisonburg, VA |
| 11/30/2020*; 4:00 p.m., FloHoops | | Buffalo | L 64–80 | 1–1 | 16 – Jefferson | 10 – McDaniel | 4 – Jefferson | Atlantic Union Bank Center; Harrisonburg, VA |
| 12/03/2020*; 7:00 p.m., ACCN | | at Virginia | W 71–67 | 2–1 | 16 – Hazell | 10 – Diouf | 6 – Tinsley | John Paul Jones Arena (250); Charlottesville, VA |
| 12/06/2020*; 2:00 p.m., NBCSN Washington | | George Mason | W 89–70 | 3–1 | 30 – McDaniel | 8 – Diouf | 6 – Tinsley | Atlantic Union Bank Center; Harrisonburg, VA |
| 12/09/2020*; 4:00 p.m., NBCSN Washington | | George Washington | W 79–69 | 4–1 | 23 – Jefferson | 13 – Diouf | 3 – Tied | Atlantic Union Bank Center; Harrisonburg, VA |
| 12/13/2020*; 6:00 p.m., ESPN+ | | at West Virginia | L 54–85 | 4–2 | 14 – Tied | 8 – McDaniel | 2 – Tinsley | WVU Coliseum (117); Morgantown, WV |
| 12/19/2020*; 11:00 a.m., BTN+ | | at No. 14 Maryland | L 59–101 | 4–3 | 14 – McDaniel | 9 – Diouf | 3 – Hazell | Xfinity Center; College Park, MD |
Conference regular season
| 01/03/2021; 2:00 p.m., FloHoops | | Towson | W 89–85 | 5–3 (1–0) | 24 – Jefferson | 11 – Jefferson | 2 – Jefferson | Atlantic Union Bank Center; Harrisonburg, VA |
| 01/10/2021; 12:00 p.m. | | UNC Wilmington | Postponed | | | | | Atlantic Union Bank Center; Harrisonburg, VA |
| 01/16/2021; 1:00 p.m., FloHoops | | at Elon | W 75–63 | 6–3 (2–0) | 16 – Jefferson | 8 – Jefferson | 5 – Jefferson | Schar Center; Elon, NC |
| 01/17/2021; 1:00 p.m., FloHoops | | at Elon | L 55–77 | 6–4 (2–1) | 18 – Jefferson | 6 – McDaniel | 3 – Tied | Schar Center; Elon, NC |
| 01/25/2021; 3:00 p.m., FloHoops | | Northeastern | W 67–49 | 7–4 (3–1) | 20 – Jefferson | 9 – Tucker | 5 – Jefferson | Atlantic Union Bank Center; Harrisonburg, VA |
| 01/26/2021; 1:00 p.m., FloHoops | | Northeastern | L 69–77 | 7–5 (3–2) | 20 – McDaniel | 9 – Carodine | 4 – Jefferson | Atlantic Union Bank Center (35); Harrisonburg, VA |
| 01/30/2021; 1:00 p.m., FloHoops | | at College of Charleston | W 70–56 | 8–5 (4–2) | 13 – Carodine | 12 – Tied | 4 – Green | TD Arena (155); Charleston, SC |
| 01/31/2021; 1:00 p.m., FloHoops | | at College of Charleston | L 63–65 | 8–6 (4–3) | 19 – Hazell | 8 – Carodine | 4 – Hazell | TD Arena (191); Charleston, SC |
| 02/06/2021; 2:00 p.m., MyValley | | Elon | W 67–55 | 9–6 (5–3) | 18 – Green | 12 – Jefferson | 2 – Tied | Atlantic Union Bank Center; Harrisonburg, VA |
| 02/06/2021; 2:00 p.m., FloHoops | | William & Mary | Postponed | | | | | Atlantic Union Bank Center; Harrisonburg, VA |
| 02/07/2021; 2:00 p.m., FloHoops | | William & Mary | Postponed | | | | | Atlantic Union Bank Center; Harrisonburg, VA |
| 02/07/2021; 2:00 p.m., MASN | | Elon | W 67–54 | 10–6 (6–3) | 14 – Tied | 9 – Jefferson | 5 – Hazell | Atlantic Union Bank Center; Harrisonburg, VA |
| 02/10/2021; 2:00 pm, FloHoops | | at Towson | L 74–83 | 10–7 (6–4) | 29 – Jefferson | 10 – Jefferson | 2 – Hazell | SECU Arena; Towson, MD |
| 02/13/2020; 2:00 p.m., FloHoops | | at Hofstra | Postponed | | | | | Mack Sports Complex; Hempstead, NY |
| 02/14/2021; 2:00 pm, FloHoops | | Hofstra | Postponed | | | | | Mack Sports Complex; Hempstead, NY |
| 02/16/2021; 3:00 p.m., FloHoops | | UNC Wilmington | W 79–55 | 11–7 (7–4) | 19 – Neff | 12 – Jefferson | 8 – Hazell | Atlantic Union Bank Center (250); Harrisonburg, VA |
| 02/20/2021; 6:00 p.m., FloHoops | | Delaware | L 88–94 ^{OT} | 11–8 (7–5) | 26 – Tucker | 10 – Tucker | 6 – Tinsley | Atlantic Union Bank Center; Harrisonburg, VA |
| 02/21/2021; 6:00 p.m., MyValley | | Delaware | W 65–62 | 12–8 (8–5) | 22 – Tucker | 9 – Carodine | 4 – Hazell | Atlantic Union Bank Center; Harrisonburg, VA |
| 02/27/2021; 1:00 p.m., FloHoops | | at Drexel | L 48–51 | 12–9 (8–6) | 9 – Diouf | 16 – Diouf | 4 – Jefferson | Daskalakis Athletic Center; Philadelphia, PA |
| 02/28/2021; 1:00 p.m., FloHoops | | at Drexel | W 61–51 | 13–9 (9–6) | 17 – Neff | 9 – Tied | 6 – Tinsley | Daskalakis Athletic Center; Philadelphia, PA |
CAA Tournament
| 03/11/2021; 6:00 p.m., FloHoops | (2) | vs. (7) Northeastern; Quarterfinals | W 81–65 | 14–9 | 23 – Jefferson | 9 – Diouf | 5 – Tinsley | Schar Center (200); Elon, NC |
| 03/12/2021; 6:00 p.m., FloHoops | (2) | vs. (3) Drexel; Semifinals | L 76–79 ^{OT} | 14–10 | 31 – Jefferson | 11 – Jefferson | 4 – Hazell | Schar Center (200); Elon, NC |
*Non-conference game. ^{#}Rankings from AP. (#) Tournament seedings in parentheses. All times are in Eastern Time.

== See also ==
- 2020–21 James Madison Dukes men's basketball team
