= List of Drexel Dragons women's basketball seasons =

The Drexel Dragons college basketball team competes in the National Collegiate Athletic Association (NCAA) Division I, representing Drexel University in the Coastal Athletic Association. The Dragons have played their home games at the Daskalakis Athletic Center in Philadelphia, Pennsylvania since 1975.

== Seasons ==
Conference champions	Conference tournament champions	Postseason berth	Postseason invitational champions

Season	Head coach	Conference	Season results							Conference tournament result	Postseason result	Final AP Poll	Ref.
Season	Head coach	Conference	Overall			Conference				Conference tournament result	Postseason result	Final AP Poll	Ref.
Season	Head coach	Conference	Wins	Losses	%	Wins	Losses	%	Finish	Conference tournament result	Postseason result	Final AP Poll	Ref.
Drexel Dragons
1921–22	?	?	?	?	?	?	?	?	?	?	—	—	
1922–23	?	?	?	?	?	?	?	?	?	?	—	—	
1923–24	?	?	?	?	?	?	?	?	?	?	—	—	
1924–25	?	?	?	?	?	?	?	?	?	?	—	—	
1925–26	?	?	?	?	?	?	?	?	?	?	—	—	
1926–27	?	?	?	?	?	?	?	?	?	?	—	—	
1927–28	?	?	?	?	?	?	?	?	?	?	—	—	
1928–29	?	?	?	?	?	?	?	?	?	?	—	—	
1929–30	?	?	?	?	?	?	?	?	?	?	—	—	
1930–31	?	?	?	?	?	?	?	?	?	?	—	—	
1931–32	?	?	?	?	?	?	?	?	?	?	—	—	
1932–33	?	?	?	?	?	?	?	?	?	?	—	—	
1933–34	?	?	?	?	?	?	?	?	?	?	—	—	
1934–35	?	?	?	?	?	?	?	?	?	?	—	—	
1935–36	?	?	?	?	?	?	?	?	?	?	—	—	
1936–37	Martha Henwood	?	?	?	?	?	?	?	?	?	—	—	
1937–38	Josephine Ulrich	?	?	?	?	?	?	?	?	?	—	—	
1938–39	Josephine Ulrich	?	?	?	?	?	?	?	?	?	—	—	
1939–40	Josephine Ulrich	?	?	?	?	?	?	?	?	?	—	—	
1940–41	Josephine Ulrich	?	?	?	?	?	?	?	?	?	—	—	
1941–42	Helen Cleaver	?	?	?	?	?	?	?	?	?	—	—	
1942–43	Helen Cleaver	?	?	?	?	?	?	?	?	?	—	—	
1943–44	Helen Cleaver	?	?	?	?	?	?	?	?	?	—	—	
1944–45	Helen Cleaver	?	?	?	?	?	?	?	?	?	—	—	
1945–46	Helen Cleaver	?	?	?	?	?	?	?	?	?	—	—	
1946–47	Helen Cleaver	?	7	2	.778	?	?	?	?	?	—	—	
1947–48	?	?	?	?	?	?	?	?	?	?	—	—	
1948–49	?	?	?	?	?	?	?	?	?	?	—	—	
1949–50	?	?	?	?	?	?	?	?	?	?	—	—	
1950–51	?	?	?	?	?	?	?	?	?	?	—	—	
1951–52	?	?	?	?	?	?	?	?	?	?	—	—	
1952–53	?	?	?	?	?	?	?	?	?	?	—	—	
1953–54	?	?	?	?	?	?	?	?	?	?	—	—	
1954–55	?	?	6	2	.750	?	?	?	?	?	—	—	
1955–56	?	?	?	?	?	?	?	?	?	?	—	—	
1956–57	?	?	?	?	?	?	?	?	?	?	—	—	
1957–58	?	?	?	2	?	?	?	?	?	?	—	—	
1958–59	?	?	?	?	?	?	?	?	?	?	—	—	
1959–60	?	?	?	?	?	?	?	?	?	?	—	—	
1960–61	?	?	4	2	.667	?	?	?	?	?	—	—	
1961–62	?	?	5	1	.833	?	?	?	?	?	—	—	
1962–63	?	?	?	?	?	?	?	?	?	?	—	—	
1963–64	Lil Haas	?	?	?	?	?	?	?	?	?	—	—	
1964–65	Lil Haas	?	?	?	?	?	?	?	?	?	—	—	
1965–66	Lil Haas	?	8	0	1.000	?	?	?	?	?	—	—	
1966–67	Lil Haas	?	8	0	1.000	?	?	?	?	?	—	—	
1967–68	Lil Haas	?	?	?	?	?	?	?	?	?	—	—	
1968–69	Lil Haas	?	?	?	?	?	?	?	?	?	—	—	
1969–70	Lil Haas	?	5	2	.714	?	?	?	?	?	—	—	
1970–71	Lil Haas	?	?	?	?	?	?	?	?	?	—	—	
1971–72	Lil Haas	?	?	?	?	?	?	?	?	?	—	—	
1972–73	Lil Haas	?	?	?	?	?	?	?	?	?	—	—	
1973–74	Lil Haas	?	?	?	?	?	?	?	?	?	—	—	
1974–75	Lil Haas	ECC	4	4	.500	?	?	?	?	?	—	—	
1975–76	Lil Haas	ECC	5	3	.625	?	?	?	?	?	—	—	
1976–77	Lil Haas	ECC	?	?	?	?	?	?	?	?	—	—	
1977–78	Lil Haas	ECC	?	?	?	?	?	?	?	?	—	—	
1978–79	Lil Haas	ECC	11	1	.917	?	?	?	?	?	—	—	
1979–80	Lil Haas	ECC	10	3	.769	?	?	?	?	?	—	—	
1980–81	Lil Haas	ECC	6	7	.462	?	?	?	?	?	—	—	
1981–82	Lil Haas	ECC	8	6	.571	?	?	?	?	?	—	—	
1982–83	Lil Haas	ECC	15	11	.577	4	5	.444	5th (East)	First Round	—	—	
1983–84	Lil Haas	ECC	9	13	.409	1	7	.125	8th	First Round	—	—	
1984–85	Lil Haas	ECC	14	12	.538	5	9	.357	5th	Quarterfinals	—	—	
1985–86	Lil Haas	ECC	11	15	.423	5	9	.357	6th	Quarterfinals	—	—	
1986–87	Lil Haas	ECC	20	7	.741	11	3	.786	T-1st	Semifinals	—	—	
1987–88	Lil Haas	ECC	19	9	.679	11	3	.786	T-1st	Champion	—	—	
1988–89	Lil Haas	ECC	12	15	.444	7	7	.500	3rd	Quarterfinals	—	—	
1989–90	Lil Haas	ECC	22	7	.759	13	1	.929	1st	Finals	—	—	
1990–91	Lil Haas	ECC	14	13	.519	7	5	.583	4th	Semifinals	—	—	
1991–92	Lil Haas	NAC	8	20	.286	3	11	.214	6th	Quarterfinals	—	—	
1992–93	Kristen Foley	NAC	5	22	.185	1	13	.071	8th	first round	—	—	
1993–94	Kristen Foley	NAC	8	19	.296	3	11	.214	7th	first round	—	—	
1994–95	Kristen Foley	NAC	13	15	.464	6	9	.400	6th	semifinals	—	—	
1995–96	Kevin Murphy	NAC	9	19	.321	6	12	.333	8th	Quarterfinals	—	—	
1996–97	Kevin Murphy	AEC	12	16	.429	9	9	.500	5th	semifinals	—	—	
1997–98	Kevin Murphy	AEC	12	16	.429	7	11	.389	7th	semifinals	—	—	
1998–99	Kevin Murphy	AEC	12	16	.429	7	11	.389	6th	Quarterfinals	—	—	
1999–00	Kevin Murphy	AEC	10	20	.333	5	13	.278	8th	Quarterfinals	—	—	
2000–01	Candace Crabtree	AEC	19	10	.655	13	5	.722	2nd	semifinals	—	—	
2001–02	Candace Crabtree	CAA	14	15	.483	6	12	.333	7th	Quarterfinals	—	—	
2002–03	Candace Crabtree	CAA	11	16	.407	7	11	.389	7th	Quarterfinals	—	—	
2003–04	Denise Dillon	CAA	10	18	.357	7	11	.389	7th	first round	—	—	
2004–05	Denise Dillon	CAA	19	10	.655	12	6	.667	3rd	semifinals	—	—	
2005–06	Denise Dillon	CAA	15	14	.517	9	9	.500	7th	Quarterfinals	—	—	
2006–07	Denise Dillon	CAA	10	21	.323	4	14	.222	9th	Quarterfinals	—	—	
2007–08	Denise Dillon	CAA	18	12	.600	13	5	.722	3rd	Quarterfinals	—	—	
2008–09	Denise Dillon	CAA	24	9	.727	16	2	.889	1st	Champion	NCAA first round	—	
2009–10	Denise Dillon	CAA	17	14	.548	11	7	.611	4th	Quarterfinals	WNIT first round	—	
2010–11	Denise Dillon	CAA	19	13	.594	10	8	.556	5th	Quarterfinals	WNIT first round	—	
2011–12	Denise Dillon	CAA	19	14	.576	12	6	.667	3rd	Finals	WNIT second round	—	
2012–13	Denise Dillon	CAA	28	10	.737	13	5	.722	3rd	Finals	WNIT Champion	—	
2013–14	Denise Dillon	CAA	15	16	.484	9	7	.563	4th	semifinals	—	—	
2014–15	Denise Dillon	CAA	20	11	.645	14	4	.778	2nd	Quarterfinals	WNIT first round	—	
2015–16	Denise Dillon	CAA	19	14	.576	13	5	.722	T-2nd	Finals	WNIT first round	—	
2016–17	Denise Dillon	CAA	22	11	.667	11	7	.611	3rd	semifinals	WNIT second round	—	
2017–18	Denise Dillon	CAA	27	8	.771	16	2	.889	T-1st	Finals	WNIT second round	—	
2018–19	Denise Dillon	CAA	24	9	.727	14	4	.778	2nd	Finals	WNIT first round	—	
2019–20	Denise Dillon	CAA	23	7	.767	16	2	.889	T-1st	Cancelled due to the COVID-19 pandemic		—	
2020–21	Amy Mallon	CAA	14	9	.609	8	6	.571	T-3rd	Champion	NCAA first round	—	
2021–22	Amy Mallon	CAA	28	6	.824	16	2	.889	1st	Finals	WNIT third round	—	
2022–23	Amy Mallon	CAA	21	10	.677	13	5	.722	T-1st	Quarterfinals	WNIT first round	—	
2023–24	Amy Mallon	CAA	19	15	.559	10	8	.556	7th	Champion	NCAA first round	—	

== See also ==
- List of Drexel Dragons men's basketball seasons
