= 2020–21 Delaware Fightin' Blue Hens women's basketball team =

Intercollegiate basketball season

2020–21 Delaware Fightin' Blue Hens women's basketball
- Conference: Colonial Athletic Association
- Record: 24-5 (16–2 CAA)
- Head coach: Natasha Adair (4th season)
- Home arena: Bob Carpenter Center

2020–21 CAA women's basketball standings
	Conf.				Overall
Team	W		L	PCT	W		L	PCT
Delaware	16	–	2	.889	24	–	5	.828
James Madison	9	–	6	.600	14	–	10	.583
Drexel†	8	–	6	.571	14	–	9	.609
Towson	8	–	6	.571	13	–	9	.591
Hofstra	5	–	7	.417	8	–	12	.400
Elon	3	–	5	.375	7	–	8	.467
Northeastern	6	–	10	.375	7	–	13	.350
William & Mary	3	–	5	.375	6	–	7	.462
Charleston	2	–	6	.250	6	–	9	.400
UNC Wilmington	3	–	10	.231	7	–	14	.333
† 2021 CAA tournament winner Rankings from AP poll

The 2020–21 Delaware Fightin' Blue Hens women's basketball team represented the University of Delaware during the 2020–21 NCAA Division I women's basketball season. The Fightin' Blue Hens, led by fourth year head coach Natasha Adair, played their home games at the Bob Carpenter Center and were members of the Colonial Athletic Association (CAA). They finished the regular season 19–3, 16–2 in CAA play to win their first conference regular season championship since 2013. They lost in the finals of the CAA women's tournament to Drexel. The team was given an automatic qualifier to the 2021 Women's National Invitation Tournament where they won the Charlotte Regional Championship by defeating Villanova. The team lost to eventual WNIT Champion Rice in the semifinals, marking Delaware's furthest advance in the tournament. The team received Top 25 votes in the Coaches Poll of the 2020–21 NCAA Division I women's basketball rankings in weeks 8, 9, 16, and 17.

== Roster ==
2020–21 Delaware Fightin' Blue Hens women's basketball team
Players
Coaches

Pos.	#	Name	Height	Year	Previous school	Hometown
G	0	Tyi Skinner	5 ft 5 in (1.65 m)	Fr	TPLS Christian Academy	Washington, D.C.
G	2	Tara Cousins	5 ft 8 in (1.73 m)	Fr	New Hope Academy	Washington, D.C.
F	3	Brynn Wade	6 ft 1 in (1.85 m)	So	Gilbert HS	Gilbert, Arizona
G	4	Paris McBride	5 ft 4 in (1.63 m)	Jr	Woodbridge HS	Woodbridge, Virginia
F	5	Agnes Paul	6 ft 1 in (1.85 m)	So	New Hope Academy	Bowie, Maryland
G	10	Tee Johnson	5 ft 5 in (1.65 m)	Sr	West Port HS/Tallahassee CC	Ocala, Florida
F	12	Lizzie O'Leary	6 ft 2 in (1.88 m)	Sr	Abington HS	Willow Grove, Pennsylvania
G	20	Jasmine Dickey	5 ft 10 in (1.78 m)	Jr	Catonsville HS	Baltimore, Maryland
G/F	21	Chyna Latimer	6 ft 0 in (1.83 m)	RS Jr	Patterson Mill HS/George Washington	Edgewood, Maryland
G	22	Mar Tejedor	5 ft 9 in (1.75 m)	Fr	Ins Moisès Broggi/Boet Mataró	Badalona, Spain
G	23	Jadaia Reid	5 ft 9 in (1.75 m)	Fr	Crestwood Preparatory	Brampton, Ontario, Canada
G	30	Jewell Smalls	5 ft 7 in (1.7 m)	Jr	McEachern HS/Western Carolina	Roswell, Georgia
F	32	Ty Battle	6 ft 0 in (1.83 m)	RS Jr	Oswego East HS/Indiana State	Plainfield, Illinois

Head coach

- Natasha Adair (South Florida)

Assistant coach(es)

- Bob Clark (Towson)
- Sarah Jenkins (Georgetown)
- Mykala Walker (Wake Forest)

Legend

- (C) Team captain
- (S) Suspended
- (I) Ineligible
- (W) Walk-on
- Injured
- Current redshirt

Roster
Last update: 29 March 2021

== Schedule ==
Date time, TV	Rank^{#}	Opponent^{#}	Result	Record	Site (attendance) city, state
Non-conference regular season
Nov 25, 2020*; 2:00 pm, FloSports		Salem University	W 111-54	1-0	Bob Carpenter Center (0); Newark, DE
December 2, 2020*; 1:00 pm		at Delaware State	Cancelled due to the COVID-19 pandemic		Memorial Hall; Dover, DE
December 6, 2020*; 6:00 pm, ACC Network		at Pittsburgh	W 85-79	2-0	Petersen Events Center (500); Pittsburgh, PA
December 10, 2020*; 2:00 pm, FloSports		St. John's	W 93-88	3-0	Bob Carpenter Center (0); Newark, DE
December 20, 2020*; 12:00 pm, ESPN+		at George Washington	L 56-61	3-1	Charles E. Smith Center (0); Washington, D.C.
CAA regular season
January 2, 2021; 1:00 pm, FloSports		at College of Charleston	Cancelled due to the COVID-19 pandemic		TD Arena; Charleston, SC
January 3, 2021; 1:00 pm, FloSports		at College of Charleston	Cancelled due to the COVID-19 pandemic		TD Arena; Charleston, SC
January 4, 2021; 1:00 pm, FloSports		at Northeastern	W 86-59	4-1 (1-0)	Matthews Arena (0); Boston, MA
January 5, 2021; 1:00 pm, FloSports		at Northeastern	W 68-61	5-1 (2-0)	Matthews Arena (0); Boston, MA
January 9, 2021; 1:00 pm, FloSports		William & Mary	W 79-55	6-1 (3-0)	Bob Carpenter Center (0); Newark, DE
January 10, 2021; 1:00 pm, FloSports		William & Mary	W 77-64	7-1 (4-0)	Bob Carpenter Center (0); Newark, DE
January 16, 2021; 2:00 pm, FloSports		at Hofstra	W 76-55	8-1 (5-0)	David S. Mack Sports and Exhibition Complex (0); Hempstead, NY
January 17, 2021; 2:00 pm, FloSports		at Hofstra	W 65-46	9-1 (6-0)	David S. Mack Sports and Exhibition Complex (0); Hempstead, NY
January 23, 2021; 1:00 pm, FloSports		UNC Wilmington	W 73-66	10-1 (7-0)	Bob Carpenter Center (0); Newark, DE
January 24, 2021; 1:00 pm, FloSports		UNC Wilmington	W 79-67	11-1 (8-0)	Bob Carpenter Center (0); Newark, DE
January 30, 2021; 1:00 pm, FloSports		at Elon	W 74-55	12-1 (9-0)	Schar Center (0); Elon, NC
January 31, 2021; 1:00 pm, FloSports		at Elon	L 61-83	12-2 (9-1)	Schar Center (0); Elon, NC
February 6, 2021; 1:00 pm, FloSports		Northeastern	W 59-47	13-2 (10-1)	Bob Carpenter Center (0); Newark, DE
February 7, 2021; 3:00 pm, FloSports		Northeastern	W 65-59	14-2 (11-1)	Bob Carpenter Center (0); Newark, DE
February 12, 2021; 6:00 pm, FloSports		Drexel	W 68-60	15-2 (12-1)	Bob Carpenter Center (0); Newark, DE
February 14, 2021; 1:00 pm, NBC Sports Philadelphia		at Drexel	W 66-55	16-2 (13-1)	Daskalakis Athletic Center (0); Philadelphia, PA
February 20, 2021; 6:00 pm, FloSports		at James Madison	W 66-55 ^{OT}	17-2 (14-1)	Atlantic Union Bank Center (0); Harrisonburg, VA
February 21, 2021; 6:00 pm, FloSports		at James Madison	L 62-65	17-3 (14-2)	Atlantic Union Bank Center (0); Harrisonburg, VA
February 27, 2021; 1:00 pm, FloSports		Towson	W 80-54	18-3 (15-2)	Bob Carpenter Center (0); Newark, DE
February 28, 2021; 1:00 pm, FloSports		Towson	W 86-55	19-3 (16-2)	Bob Carpenter Center (0); Newark, DE
CAA Women's Tournament
March 11, 2021; 2:30 pm, FloSports	No. (1)	vs. No. (9) UNC Wilmington; Quarterfinals	W 70-52	20-3	Schar Center (200); Elon, NC
March 12, 2021; 2:30 pm, FloSports	No. (1)	vs. No. (5) Hofstra; Semifinals	W 60-39	21-3	Schar Center (200); Elon, NC
March 13, 2021; 5:00 pm, FloSports	No. (1)	vs. No. (3) Drexel; Championship	L 52-63	21-4	Schar Center (200); Elon, NC
WNIT
March 19, 2021; 11:00 a.m.		vs. Fordham; First Round – Charlotte Regional	W 77-49	22–4	Bojangles Coliseum; Charlotte, NC
March 20, 2021; 5:00 p.m.		vs. Clemson; Second Round – Charlotte Regional	W 87-74	23–4	Bojangles Coliseum; Charlotte, NC
March 22, 2021; 7:00 p.m.		vs. Villanova; Quarterfinals – Charlotte Regional	W 77-70	24–4	Bojangles Coliseum; Charlotte, NC
March 26, 2021; 4:00 p.m.		vs. Rice; Semifinals	L 75–85	24–5	My Town Movers Fieldhouse; Collierville, TN
*Non-conference game. ^{#}Rankings from AP Poll. (#) Tournament seedings in parentheses. All times are in Eastern Time.

== Awards and honors ==
- Jasmine Dickey received WNIT Charlotte All-Region Team and WNIT All-Tournament Team.
- Jasmine Dickey received CAA Player of the Year, First team All-CAA selection, CAA All-Defensive team, and CAA All-Tournament Team.
- Ty Battle received First team All-CAA selection, CAA All-Defensive team, and CAA All-Tournament Team.
- Natasha Adair received CAA Coach of the Year.
