= 2020–21 Drexel Dragons women's basketball team =

American college basketball season

2020–21 Drexel Dragons women's basketball

CAA Tournament Champions

NCAA tournament, first round, L53–67
- Conference: Colonial Athletic Association
- Record: 14–9 (8–6 CAA)
- Head coach: Amy Mallon (1st season)
- Assistant coaches: Stacy Weiss (9th season); Laura Kurz (1st season); Jillian Dunston (1st season)
- Captain: Kayla Bacon
- Home arena: Daskalakis Athletic Center

2020–21 CAA women's basketball standings
	Conf.				Overall
Team	W		L	PCT	W		L	PCT
Delaware	16	–	2	.889	24	–	5	.828
James Madison	9	–	6	.600	14	–	10	.583
Drexel†	8	–	6	.571	14	–	9	.609
Towson	8	–	6	.571	13	–	9	.591
Hofstra	5	–	7	.417	8	–	12	.400
Elon	3	–	5	.375	7	–	8	.467
Northeastern	6	–	10	.375	7	–	13	.350
William & Mary	3	–	5	.375	6	–	7	.462
Charleston	2	–	6	.250	6	–	9	.400
UNC Wilmington	3	–	10	.231	7	–	14	.333
† 2021 CAA tournament winner Rankings from AP poll

The 2020–21 Drexel Dragons women's basketball team represented Drexel University during the 2020–21 NCAA Division I women's basketball season. The Dragons, led by first-year head coach Amy Mallon, played their home games at the Daskalakis Athletic Center in Philadelphia, Pennsylvania as members of the Colonial Athletic Association.

== Offseason ==
=== Departures ===
Name	Number	Pos.	Height	Year	Hometown	Notes
AJ Davis	3	F	6'1"	Freshman	Baltimore, MD	
Maria Ferariu	5	G	6'0"	RS Freshman	Brașov, Romania	
Aubree Brown	11	G	5'11"	RS Senior	Philadelphia, PA	Graduated
Bailey Greenberg	23	F	5'11"	Senior	North Wales, PA	Graduated
Niki Metzel	24	F	6'2"	Senior	Princeton, NJ	Graduated
Ana Ferariu	50	G	5'9"	Senior	Brașov, Romania	Graduated

=== Incoming transfers ===
College recruiting information
Name	Hometown	School	Height	Weight	Commit date
Tori Hyduke; G	Fair Haven, NJ	George Washington University	5 ft 6 in (1.68 m)	N/A	Jun 12, 2020
Tori Hyduke; G	Recruit ratings: No ratings found				
Overall recruit ranking:
Note: In many cases, Scout, Rivals, 247Sports, On3, and ESPN may conflict in their listings of height and weight.; In these cases, the average was taken. ESPN grades are on a 100-point scale.; Sources: "Drexel 2020 Basketball Commitments". Rivals.; "Drexel Dragons". ESPN.; "2020 Team Ranking". Rivals.

=== 2020 recruiting class ===
College recruiting information
Name	Hometown	School	Height	Weight	Commit date
Erin Sweeney; SG/SF	Radnor, PA	Archbishop John Carroll HS	5 ft 10 in (1.78 m)	N/A	Apr 8, 2019
Erin Sweeney; SG/SF	Recruit ratings: No ratings found				
Elizabeth Dufrane; SG	McLean, VA	McLean HS	5 ft 8 in (1.73 m)	N/A	Aug 28, 2019
Elizabeth Dufrane; SG	Recruit ratings: No ratings found				
Jasmine Valentine; PF	Millersville, MD	Old Mill HS	5 ft 10 in (1.78 m)	N/A	Mar 23, 2020
Jasmine Valentine; PF	Recruit ratings: No ratings found				
Chloe Hodges; W			6 ft 0 in (1.83 m)	N/A	Apr 15, 2020
Chloe Hodges; W	Recruit ratings: No ratings found				
Overall recruit ranking:
Note: In many cases, Scout, Rivals, 247Sports, On3, and ESPN may conflict in their listings of height and weight.; In these cases, the average was taken. ESPN grades are on a 100-point scale.; Sources: "Drexel 2020 Basketball Commitments". Rivals.; "Drexel Dragons". ESPN.; "2020 Team Ranking". Rivals.

== Roster ==
2020–21 Drexel Dragons women's basketball team
Players
Coaches

Pos.	#	Name	Height	Year	Previous school	Hometown
G	1	Keishana Washington	5 ft 7 in (1.7 m)	Jr	Durham Elite Prep	Pickering, Ontario
F	2	Hetta Saatman	6 ft 2 in (1.88 m)	So	Linden Hall	Lancaster, PA
G	4	Kayla Bacon (C)	5 ft 8 in (1.73 m)	Sr	Seton Keough	Owings Mills, MD
F	5	Chloe Hodges	6 ft 0 in (1.83 m)	Fr	St Michael's	Adelaide, Australia
F	10	Brianne Borcky	6 ft 0 in (1.83 m)	So	Garnet Valley HS	Glen Mills, PA
G	11	Tori Hyduke	5 ft 6 in (1.68 m)	RS So	Rumson-Fair Haven/George Washington	Fair Haven, NJ
G	12	Hannah Nihill	5 ft 3 in (1.6 m)	Sr	Cardinal O'Hara	Drexel Hill, PA
G	13	Erin Sweeney	5 ft 10 in (1.78 m)	Fr	Archbishop John Carroll HS	Havertown, PA
G	14	Elizabeth Dufrane	5 ft 8 in (1.73 m)	Fr	McLean HS	Falls Church, VA
F	20	Kate Connolly	6 ft 1 in (1.85 m)	Jr	Souderton Area HS	Harleysville, PA
F	21	Jasmine Valentine	5 ft 11 in (1.8 m)	Fr	St. Vincent Pallotti HS	Odenton, MD
G	22	Maura Hendrixson	5 ft 9 in (1.75 m)	Jr	Cardinal O'Hara HS (PA)	Garnet Valley, PA
F	30	Mariah Leonard	5 ft 10 in (1.78 m)	RS Sr	Broad Run	Ashburn, VA

Head coach

- Amy Mallon (Saint Joseph's)

Assistant coach(es)

- Stacy Weiss (Drexel)
- Laura Kurz (Villanova)
- Jillian Dunston (Michigan)

Legend

- (C) Team captain
- (S) Suspended
- (I) Ineligible
- (W) Walk-on
- Injured
- Current redshirt

Roster
Last update: December 10, 2020

== Schedule and results ==
Date time, TV	Rank^{#}	Opponent^{#}	Result	Record	High points	High rebounds	High assists	Site (attendance) city, state
Non-conference regular season
November 28, 2020*; 2:00 pm, ESPN3		at Rider	W 62–49	1–0	22 – Nihill	9 – Saatman	4 – Washington	Alumni Gymnasium (0); Lawrenceville, NJ
December 2, 2020*; 6:00 pm, NBCS+		Saint Joseph's	Postponed due to the COVID-19 pandemic					Daskalakis Athletic Center; Philadelphia, PA
December 5, 2020*; 2:00 pm, ESPN3		at Monmouth	W 61–50	2–0	18 – Nihill	9 – Connolly	8 – Hendrixson	OceanFirst Bank Center (0); West Long Branch, NJ
December 13, 2020*; 1:00 pm		at Villanova	L 46–48	2–1	16 – Washington	9 – Washington	3 – Washington	Finneran Pavilion (0); Villanova, PA
December 16, 2020*; 7:00 pm, ESPN+		at La Salle	Postponed due to the COVID-19 pandemic					Tom Gola Arena; Philadelphia, PA
December 20, 2020*; 2:00 pm		Old Dominion	Postponed due to the COVID-19 pandemic					Daskalakis Athletic Center; Philadelphia, PA
December 22, 2020*; 7:00 pm		Saint Joseph's	Postponed due to the COVID-19 pandemic					Daskalakis Athletic Center; Philadelphia, PA
CAA regular season
January 2, 2021; 1:00 pm		at UNC Wilmington	W 76–63	3–1 (1–0)	18 – Nihill	10 – Leonard	5 – Nihill	Trask Coliseum (25); Wilmington, NC
January 3, 2021; 1:00 pm		at UNC Wilmington	W 61–34	4–1 (2–0)	13 – Nihill	7 – Leonard	6 – Hendrixson	Trask Coliseum (25); Wilmington, NC
January 9, 2021		Charleston	Postponed due to COVID-19					Daskalakis Athletic Center; Philadelphia, PA
January 9, 2021*; 2:00 pm, NBCSPHI+		Delaware State	W 70–47	5–1	15 – Leonard	6 – Connolly	6 – Nihill	Daskalakis Athletic Center (0); Philadelphia, PA
January 10, 2021		Charleston	Postponed due to COVID-19					Daskalakis Athletic Center; Philadelphia, PA
January 13, 2021*; 6:00 pm, ESPN+		at La Salle	L 55–58	5–2	16 – Washington	7 – Leonard	6 – Nihill	Tom Gola Arena (0); Philadelphia, PA
January 16, 2021; 2:00 pm		at William & Mary	W 64–58	6–2 (3–0)	17 – Leonard	11 – Leonard	6 – Nihill	Kaplan Arena (0); Williamsburg, VA
January 17, 2021; 2:00 pm		at William & Mary	L 53–69	6–3 (3–1)	18 – Nihill	7 – Tied	5 – Hendrixson	Kaplan Arena (0); Williamsburg, VA
January 23, 2021; 1:00 pm		Elon	L 57–59	6–4 (3–2)	16 – Tied	9 – Leonard	7 – Hendrixson	Daskalakis Athletic Center (0); Philadelphia, PA
January 24, 2021; 1:00 pm		Elon	W 55–44	7–4 (4–2)	22 – Nihill	7 – Leonard	5 – Hendrixson	Daskalakis Athletic Center (0); Philadelphia, PA
January 30, 2021; 12:00 pm		at Northeastern	W 79–64	8–4 (5–2)	21 – Nihill	6 – Bacon	8 – Washington	Cabot Center (0); Boston, MA
January 31, 2021; 12:00 pm		at Northeastern	W 58–56	9–4 (6–2)	19 – Nihill	6 – Leonard	6 – Hendrixson	Cabot Center (0); Boston, MA
February 6, 2021; 1:00 pm, NBCSPHI		Hofstra	Postponed due to COVID-19					Daskalakis Athletic Center; Philadelphia, PA
February 7, 2021; 1:00 pm		Hofstra	Postponed due to COVID-19					Daskalakis Athletic Center; Philadelphia, PA
February 12, 2021; 6:00 pm		at Delaware	L 60–68	9–5 (6–3)	32 – Nihill	10 – Leonard	5 – Hendrixson	Bob Carpenter Center (0); Newark, DE
February 14, 2021; 1:00 pm, NBCSPHI		Delaware	L 55–65	9–6 (6–4)	23 – Washington	7 – Bacon	7 – Nihill	Daskalakis Athletic Center (0); Philadelphia, PA
February 20, 2021; 2:00 pm		at Towson	W 71–55	10–6 (7–4)	19 – Washington	7 – Hendrixson	5 – Nihill	SECU Arena (0); Towson, MD
February 21, 2021; 2:00 pm		at Towson	L 62–77	10–7 (7–5)	17 – Washington	3 – 4 Tied	3 – Washington	SECU Arena (0); Towson, MD
February 27, 2021; 1:00 pm		James Madison	W 51–48	11–7 (8–5)	20 – Nihill	7 – Leonard	6 – Nihill	Daskalakis Athletic Center (0); Philadelphia, PA
February 28, 2021; 1:00 pm		James Madison	L 51–61	11–8 (8–6)	16 – Washington	7 – Tied	3 – Bacon	Daskalakis Athletic Center (0); Philadelphia, PA
CAA Tournament
March 11, 2021; 9:30 pm	(3)	at (6) Elon; Quarterfinals	W 65–59	12–8	24 – Nihill	6 – Tied	5 – Nihill	Schar Center (200); Elon, NC
March 12, 2021; 6:00 pm	(3)	vs. (2) James Madison; Semifinals	W 79–76 ^{OT}	13–8	35 – Washington	8 – Connolly	3 – Nihill	Schar Center (200); Elon, NC
March 13, 2021; 5:00 pm	(3)	vs. (1) Delaware; Championship	W 63–52	14–8	30 – Washington	6 – Nihill	3 – Tied	Schar Center (200); Elon, NC
NCAA tournament
March 22, 2021; 12:00 pm, ESPN2	(14 A)	vs. (3 A) No. 10 Georgia; First round	L 53–67	14–9	22 – Nihill	8 – Leonard	5 – Washington	Bill Greehey Arena; San Antonio, Texas
*Non-conference game. ^{#}Rankings from AP. (#) Tournament seedings in parentheses. All times are in Eastern Time.

== Awards ==
Kate Connolly

- CAA All-Tournament Team

Hannah Nihill

- CAA Defensive Player of the Year
- CAA All-Conference First Team
- CAA All-Defensive Team
- CAA Dean Ehlers Leadership Award
- CAA All-Tournament Team

Keishana Washington

- CAA All-Conference Third Team
- CAA Tournament Most Outstanding Player
- CAA All-Tournament Team

== See also ==
- 2020–21 Drexel Dragons men's basketball team
