= Shanae Baker-Brice =

American basketball player

Personal information
- Born: 24 September 1987 (age 39) Washington D.C., U.S.
- Listed height: 5 ft 6 in (1.68 m)
- Listed weight: 131 lb (59 kg)

Career information
- High school: Theodore Roosevelt (Washington D.C.)
- College: Towson (2006–2010)
- Playing career: 2010–2012
- Position: Point guard

Career history
- 2010–2011: Edremit
- 2011–2012: Njarðvík

Career highlights
- Icelandic Cup Finals MVP (2012); Icelandic champion (2012); Icelandic Basketball Cup (2012); 2× First-team All-CAA (2009, 2010); Third-team All-CAA (2008); CAA All-Defensive team (2009); CAA All-Freshman Team (2007)

Shanae Baker-Brice (born 24 September 1987) is an American former basketball player. She played college basketball for Towson University where she was a two time first-team All-CAA. She later played professionally in Iceland where she won both the national championship and national cup with Njarðvík in 2012.

== College career ==
After starring at Theodore Roosevelt High School, Baker-Brice played college basketball for Towson Tigers women's basketball from 2006 to 2010. She was named to three All-Coastal Athletic Association teams, including the first team during her junior and senior years, and to the CAA All-Defensive team as a junior. She left the school as its all time leading scorer with 1,806 points scored after breaking Danielle Barry's career scoring mark of 1,555 points in her senior year.

== Professional career ==
After graduation from college, Baker-Brice started her professional career with Edremit in Turkey. In 2011, she signed with Njarðvík of the Icelandic Úrvalsdeild kvenna. On 18 February 2012, she was named the MVP of the Icelandic Basketball Cup final after leading Njarðvík to its first ever Cup final win with 35 points and 16 rebounds. In April, she helped Njarðvík to its first ever Icelandic championship after averaging 26.5 points, 6.9 rebounds and 4.8 assists during the playoffs.

== Later life ==
In 2013, she was hired as Towson Tigers director of basketball operation.

== Career statistics ==
Legend
GP	Games played	GS	Games started	MPG	Minutes per game	RPG	Rebounds per game
APG	Assists per game	SPG	Steals per game	BPG	Blocks per game	PPG	Points per game
TO	Turnovers per game	FG%	Field-goal percentage	3P%	3-point field-goal percentage	FT%	Free-throw percentage
**Bold**	Career best	°	League leader

=== College ===
Year	Team	GP	GS	MPG	FG%	3P%	FT%	RPG	APG	SPG	BPG	TO	PPG
2006–07	Towson	29	-	33.7	**41.0**	**30.0**	66.7	4.7	3.1	2.6	**0.2**	**3.2**	13.7
2007–08	Towson	32	-	32.7	38.9	24.6	**78.9**	3.9	4.2	2.0	0.1	3.9	11.7
2008–09	Towson	29	-	34.3	40.3	27.3	72.2	4.4	3.9	**3.0**	0.1	3.6	17.0
2009–10	Towson	**31**	30	**35.5**	36.0	26.6	65.2	**5.1**	4.2	2.2	0.1	4.5	**17.4**
**Career**		121	30	34.1	38.8	27.2	70.2	4.5	3.9	2.4	0.1	3.8	14.9
Statistics retrieved from Sports-Reference.
