= Nicole Woods (basketball) =

American college basketball coach (born 1984)

Current position
- Title: Head coach
- Team: UNC Wilmington
- Conference: CAA
- Record: 26–67 (.280)

Biographical details
- Born: June 20, 1984 (age 42); Greensboro, North Carolina, U.S.

Playing career
- 2002–2006: Belmont Abbey College
- 2007–2008: Nottingham Wildcats

Coaching career (HC unless noted)
- 2009–2011: Southern Illinois (GA)
- 2011–2013: Stetson (assistant)
- 2013–2023: Charlotte (assistant/AHC)
- 2023–present: UNC Wilmington

Head coaching record
- Overall: 26–67 (.280)

Accomplishments and honors

Championships
- As an Assistant: C-USA regular season (2022); C-USA Tournament (2022)

Nicole Woods (born June 20, 1984) is an American college basketball coach who is the head coach at UNC Wilmington.

== Early life and education ==
Born Alicia Nicole Woods in Greensboro, North Carolina, Woods attended Hunter Huss High School in Gastonia, North Carolina, and played collegiately at Belmont Abbey College from 2002 to 2006. While at Belmont Abbey, Woods was an NCAA Division II Bulletin Second-Team All-American, averaging 24.1 ppg, less than .01 ppg behind the national leader. Woods was also selected Carolina-Virginia Athletic Conference (now Conference Carolinas) Player of the Year after averaging 7.7 rebounds and 3.3 assists during her senior campaign.

Woods is the school's fourth all-time leading scorer with 1,641 points. Her 676 markers in 2005-06 is a school record.

Woods would go on to play professionally in England for the Nottingham Wildcats in 2007–08, leading the team in assists and ranking second in scoring.

== Coaching career ==
=== Southern Illinois ===
Woods began her coaching career as a graduate assistant at Southern Illinois University Carbondale in 2009 and remained at SIU until 2011.

=== Stetson University ===
In 2011, Woods would accept her first assistant coach position at Stetson University.

At Stetson, Woods played a key role when the Hatters and Head Coach Lynn Bria cranked out a school record 23 victories and the program's first WNIT berth in 2012. Woods and the Hatters went on to capture the 2013 Atlantic Sun Championship, earning an NCAA First-Round matchup vs. No. 3-seeded UCLA.

=== Charlotte ===
In 2013, Woods was hired to Cara Consuegra's staff at the University of North Carolina at Charlotte.

Woods would become recruiting coordinator for her final six seasons at Charlotte and Associate Coach in her last. While at UNCC, she'd help lead the team to four WNIT berths (2014, 2016, 2019, 2021) and one NCAA Tournament appearance. The 49ers captured the 2022 Conference USA Championship.

Charlotte racked up five winning seasons and four 20-win campaigns during her time in the Queen City. With Woods on the staff, the 49ers recorded a C-USA winning percentage of .500 or better in nine straight seasons from 2013 to 2022, capped by a 15–3 conference mark in the 2022 championship season.

=== UNC Wilmington ===
On April 13, 2023, Woods was named as the 12th head coach in UNC Wilmington's history.

== Head coaching record ==
Record table
Season	Team	Overall	Conference	Standing	Postseason
UNC Wilmington (CAA) (2023–present)
2023–24	UNC Wilmington	5–25	3–15	T–12th	
2024–25	UNC Wilmington	14–18	8–10	T–9th	
2025–26	UNC Wilmington	7–24	2–16	13th	
UNC Wilmington:		26–67 (.280)	13–41 (.241)		
Total:		26–67 (.280)			
National champion Postseason invitational champion Conference regular season champion Conference regular season and conference tournament champion Division regular season champion Division regular season and conference tournament champion Conference tournament champion
