= 2012 Colonial Athletic Association men's soccer season =

Colonial Athletic Association
- Season: 2012
- Champions: TBD
- Premiers: TBD
- NCAA Tournament: TBD

The 2012 Colonial Athletic Association men's soccer season pertains to all CAA men's college soccer during the 2012 NCAA Division I men's soccer season.

The Delaware Fighting Blue Hens are the defending conference tournament champions, while the James Madison Dukes are the defending regular season winners. While the NCAA season will begin in late August 2012, conference play will not begin until late September or early October 2012.

== Changes from 2011 ==
- VCU Rams have left the conference to join the Atlantic 10 Conference

== Teams ==
=== Stadiums and locations ===
Team	Location	Stadium	Capacity
Delaware Fighting Blue Hens	Newark, Delaware	Delaware Mini Stadium	1,500
Drexel Dragons	Philadelphia, Pennsylvania	Vidas Field	2,750
George Mason Patriots	Fairfax, Virginia	George Mason Stadium	4,000
Hofstra Pride	Hempstead, New York	Hofstra Soccer Stadium	2,000
James Madison Dukes	Harrisonburg, Virginia	JMU Soccer/Lacrosse Complex	1,500
Northeastern Huskies	Boston, Massachusetts	Parsons Field	7,000
Old Dominion Monarchs	Norfolk, Virginia	Old Dominion Soccer Complex	3,000
Towson Tigers	Towson, Maryland	Tiger Soccer Complex	600
UNC Wilmington Seahawks	Wilmington, North Carolina	UNCW Soccer Stadium	1,000
William & Mary Tribe	Wilmington, North Carolina	UNCW Soccer Stadium	2,000

== Standings ==
2012 CAA men's soccer standings
	Conf.					Overall
Team	W		L		T	W		L		T
Drexel	8	–	1	–	1	12	–	4	–	3
Northeastern†	6	–	1	–	3	14	–	3	–	4
James Madison	6	–	2	–	2	9	–	7	–	3
Old Dominion	5	–	3	–	2	11	–	3	–	4
Hofstra	5	–	4	–	1	11	–	6	–	4
George Mason	4	–	5	–	1	11	–	6	–	2
UNC Wilmington	4	–	6	–	0	7	–	11	–	1
William & Mary	2	–	5	–	3	4	–	10	–	4
Delaware	2	–	5	–	3	4	–	11	–	4
Towson	2	–	6	–	2	4	–	10	–	2
Georgia State	2	–	8	–	0	6	–	12	–	0
As of December 11, 2012; Rankings from NSCAA

== CAA Tournament ==
The CAA Tournament will determine the conference's guaranteed berth into the 2012 NCAA Division I Men's Soccer Championship.

== Results ==
Home \ Away	DEL	DRE	GMU	GSU	HOF	JMU	NCW	NOR	ODU	TOW	VCU	W&M
Delaware Fighting Blue Hens												
Drexel Dragons												
George Mason Patriots												
Georgia State Panthers												
Hofstra Pride												
James Madison Dukes												
UNC Wilmington Seahawks												
Northeastern Huskies												
Old Dominion Monarchs												
Towson Tigers												
VCU Rams												
William & Mary Tribe												

Updated to match(es) played on unknown. Source:
Legend: Blue = home team win; Yellow = draw; Red = away team win.
