= Amy Mallon =

American college basketball coach

Current position
- Title: Head coach
- Team: Drexel
- Conference: CAA
- Record: 120–64

Biographical details
- Born: April 21, 1970 (age 56)

Playing career
- 1988–1991: Richmond
- 1992–1993: Saint Joseph's
- 1993: Résidence de Walferdang
- 1998: Philadelphia Rage
- 2001: Irish Senior National Team
- Position: Forward

Coaching career (HC unless noted)
- 1994–1995: Rosemont
- 1995–1996: Villanova (assistant)
- 1996–1997: Saint Joseph's (assistant)
- 1997–2004: Episcopal Academy
- 2004–2020: Drexel (assistant)
- 2020–present: Drexel

Head coaching record
- Overall: 120–64 (D-I)

Accomplishments and honors

Championships
- 2 CAA tournament: 2021, 2024; 2 CAA regular season: 2022, 2023

Awards
- CAA Coach of the Year: 2022

Amy Mallon (born April 21, 1970) is an American women's basketball coach and former player, who is the current head coach of the Drexel Dragons women's basketball team.

== Coaching career ==
On March 27, 2020, it was announced that Mallon would become the head coach of Drexel's women's basketball team, taking the helm from coach Denise Dillon after she accepted the head coaching position at Villanova.

== Head coaching record ==
- Drexel
- CAA

Record table
Season	Team	Overall	Conference	Standing	Postseason
Drexel (Colonial Athletic Association) (2020–present)
2020–21	Drexel	14–9	8–6	T–3rd	NCAA First Round
2021–22	Drexel	28–6	16–2	1st	WNIT Third Round
2022–23	Drexel	21–10	13–5	1st	WNIT First Round
2023–24	Drexel	19–15	10–8	7th	NCAA First Round
2024–25	Drexel	17–13	12–6	T-3rd	
2025–26	Drexel	21–11	13–5	T-2nd	WNIT First Round
Drexel:		120–64 (.652)	72–32 (.692)		
Total:		120–64 (.652)			
National champion Postseason invitational champion Conference regular season champion Conference regular season and conference tournament champion Division regular season champion Division regular season and conference tournament champion Conference tournament champion
