= 2021 CAA women's basketball tournament =

- Classification: Division I
- Season: 2020–21
- Teams: 9
- Site: Schar Center; Elon, North Carolina
- Champions: Drexel (2nd title)
- Winning coach: Amy Mallon (1st title)
- MVP: Keishana Washington (Drexel)
- Television: FloHoops
- CAA women's basketball tournaments

2020–21 CAA women's basketball standings
	Conf.				Overall
Team	W		L	PCT	W		L	PCT
Delaware	16	–	2	.889	24	–	5	.828
James Madison	9	–	6	.600	14	–	10	.583
Drexel†	8	–	6	.571	14	–	9	.609
Towson	8	–	6	.571	13	–	9	.591
Hofstra	5	–	7	.417	8	–	12	.400
Elon	3	–	5	.375	7	–	8	.467
Northeastern	6	–	10	.375	7	–	13	.350
William & Mary	3	–	5	.375	6	–	7	.462
Charleston	2	–	6	.250	6	–	9	.400
UNC Wilmington	3	–	10	.231	7	–	14	.333
† 2021 CAA tournament winner Rankings from AP poll

The 2021 Colonial Athletic Association women's basketball tournament is a postseason women's basketball tournament for the Colonial Athletic Association for the 2020–21 NCAA Division I women's basketball season. The tournament was held from March 10–13, 2021 at the Schar Center in Elon, North Carolina. Drexel won the conference tournament championship game over Delaware, 63–52, earning Drexel an automatic bid to the 2021 NCAA Division I women's basketball tournament.

== Seeds ==
William & Mary did not participate in the tournament, as they voluntarily ended their season early due to the COVID-19 pandemic. The remaining 9 were seeded by conference record, with a tiebreaker system used to seed teams with identical conference records. The top seven teams received a bye to the quarterfinals.

Seed	School	Conf.	Tiebreaker 1	Tiebreaker 2
1	Delaware	16–2		
2	James Madison	9–6		
3	Drexel	8–6	2–0 vs Northeastern	
4	Towson	8–6	1–1 vs Northeastern	
5	Hofstra	5–7		
6	Elon	3–5	1–1 vs Delaware	
7	Northeastern	6–10	0–4 vs Delaware	
8	Charleston	2–6		
9	UNCW	3–10		

== Schedule ==
Session	Game	Time*	Matchup	Score	Television
First round – Wednesday, March 10
1	1	2:30 pm	No. 9 UNCW vs No. 8 Charleston	60–47	FloHoops
Quarterfinals – Thursday, March 11
2	2	11:00 am	No. 5 Hofstra vs No. 4 Towson	77–67^{OT}	FloHoops
2	3	2:30 pm	No. 9 UNCW vs No. 1 Delaware	52-70	FloHoops
3	4	6:00 pm	No. 7 Northeastern vs No. 2 James Madison	65-81	FloHoops
3	5	9:30 pm	No. 6 Elon vs No. 3 Drexel	59-65	FloHoops
Semifinals – Friday, March 12
4	6	2:30 pm	No. 5 Hofstra vs No. 1 Delaware	39-60	FloHoops
4	7	6:00 pm	No. 2 James Madison vs No. 3 Drexel	79–76^{OT}	FloHoops
Championship – Saturday, March 13
5	8	5:00 pm	No. 1 Delaware vs No. 3 Drexel	52-63	FloHoops
*Game times in ET. Rankings denote tournament seed

== Bracket ==
First round Wednesday, March 10; FloHoops
8	Charleston	47
9	UNCW	60

Quarterfinals; Thursday, March 11; FloHoops
1	Delaware	70
9	UNCW	52
4	Towson	67
5	Hofstra	77*
2	James Madison	81
7	Northeastern	65
3	Drexel	65
6	Elon	59

Semifinals; Friday, March 12; FloHoops
1	Delaware	60
5	Hofstra	39
2	James Madison	76
3	Drexel	79*

Final; Saturday, March 13; FloHoops
1	Delaware	52
3	Drexel	63

* denotes overtime game

== See also ==
- 2021 CAA men's basketball tournament
