= 2014 CAA women's basketball tournament =

Sporting event

- Classification: Division I
- Season: 2013–14
- Teams: 9
- Site: Show Place Arena; Upper Marlboro, Maryland
- Champions: James Madison (7th title)
- Winning coach: Kenny Brooks (3rd title)
- Television: NBC Regional
- CAA women's basketball tournaments

2013–14 CAA women's basketball standings
	Conf.				Overall
Team	W		L	PCT	W		L	PCT
James Madison†	15	–	1	.938	29	–	6	.829
Delaware	10	–	6	.625	20	–	11	.645
Charleston	9	–	7	.563	19	–	15	.559
Drexel	9	–	7	.563	15	–	16	.484
Hofstra	8	–	8	.500	14	–	15	.483
Towson	7	–	9	.438	13	–	17	.433
Northeastern	6	–	10	.375	12	–	18	.400
William & Mary	5	–	11	.313	8	–	21	.276
UNC Wilmington	3	–	13	.188	5	–	27	.156
† 2014 CAA tournament winner Rankings from AP poll

The 2014 Colonial Athletic Association women's basketball tournament was held March 13–16 at the Show Place Arena in Upper Marlboro, Maryland. Champion James Madison University received an automatic bid to the 2014 NCAA tournament.

The 2014 tournament featured nine teams due to the departure of George Mason from the conference to join the Atlantic 10, and the addition of the College of Charleston.

== Schedule ==
Session	Game	Time*	Matchup^{#}	Television
First round – Thursday, March 13, 2014
1	1	2:00 pm	#9 UNC Wilmington vs #8 William & Mary	CAA.TV
Quarterfinals – Friday, March 14, 2014
2	2	12:00 pm	#9 UNC Wilmington vs #1 James Madison	CAA.TV
2	3	2:30 pm	#5 Hofstra vs #4 Drexel	CAA.TV
3	4	5:00 pm	#7 Northeastern vs #2 Delaware	CAA.TV
3	5	7:30 pm	#6 Towson vs #3 Charleston	CAA.TV
Semifinals – Saturday, March 15, 2014
4	6	12:00 pm	#1 James Madison v. #4 Drexel	NBC Regional
4	7	2:30 pm	#2 Delaware vs #3 Charleston	NBC Regional
Championship – Sunday, March 16, 2014
5	8	12:00 pm	#1 James Madison vs #2 Delaware	NBC Regional
*Game times in ET. #-Rankings denote tournament seed

== Bracket ==
First round Thursday, March 13; CAA.TV
8	William & Mary	65
9	UNC Wilmington	67

Quarterfinals; Friday, March 14; CAA.TV
1	James Madison	69
9	UNC Wilmington	56
4	Drexel	60
5	Hofstra	55
2	Delaware	63
7	Northeastern	61
3	Charleston	70
6	Towson	64

Semifinals; Saturday, March 15; NBC Regional
1	James Madison	55
4	Drexel	43
2	Delaware	60
3	Charleston	52

Championship; Sunday, March 16; NBC Regional
1	James Madison	70
2	Delaware	45

== See also ==
- 2014 CAA men's basketball tournament
