= Drexel Dragons women's basketball =

American college basketball team

2024–25 Drexel Dragons women's basketball team
- University: Drexel University
- First season: 1921–22; 105 years ago
- Head coach: Amy Mallon (5th season)
- Location: Philadelphia, Pennsylvania
- Arena: Daskalakis Athletic Center (capacity: 2,509)
- Conference: CAA
- Nickname: Dragons
- Colors: Navy blue and gold
- Student section: DAC Pack
- All-time record: 641–533 (.546) (Division I) (through 2021–22 season)

NCAA Division I tournament appearances
- 2009, 2021, 2024

Conference tournament champions
- 1988, 2009, 2021, 2024

Conference regular-season champions
- 1987, 1988, 1990, 2009, 2018, 2020, 2022, 2023

WNIT champions
- 2013

Uniforms
Home	Away

The Drexel Dragons women's basketball program represents intercollegiate women's basketball at Drexel University. The team currently competes in the Coastal Athletic Association in Division I of the National Collegiate Athletic Association (NCAA) and play home games at the Daskalakis Athletic Center in Philadelphia, Pennsylvania.

== History ==
1899 Drexel Institute women's basketball team

Drexel women's basketball began in 1887, and the first officially organised team began playing in 1909. The first intercollegiate season began in 1921, playing their first game against Swarthmore College. The first games were played at the 33rd Street Armory. The Dragons joined Division I in 1982. In the 1980s, the team nickname changed from the Dragonettes to the Dragons.

Drexel accomplished two consecutive undefeated seasons in 1965–66 and 1966–67. Both teams finished with a record of 8–0.

Drexel has received three bids to the NCAA Division I tournament, occurring in 2009, 2021, and 2024. Drexel's women's basketball team won their first national title in 2013, winning the NIT Tournament.

On February 22, 2007, Drexel defeated Northeastern 98–90 in an NCAA Division I record five overtimes.

== Postseason results ==
=== NCAA Division I tournament results ===
The Dragons have appeared in the NCAA Division I tournament three times. Their combined record is 0–3.

Year	Seed	Round	Opponent	Result
2009	#12	First Round	#5 Kansas State	L 44–68
2021	#14	First Round	#3 Georgia	L 53–67
2024	#16	First Round	#1 Texas	L 42–82

=== WNIT results ===
The Dragons have appeared in the Women's National Invitation Tournament (WNIT) twelve times, winning it in 2013. Their combined record is 11–11.

Year	Round	Opponent	Result
2010	First Round	East Carolina	L 76–78 ^{OT}
2011	First Round	Florida Gulf Coast	L 67–73
2012	First Roud; Second Round	Fairfield; Syracuse	W 57–51; L 43–65
2013	First Round; Second Round; Third Round; Quarterfinals; Semifinals; Championship	Iona; Harvard; Bowling Green; Auburn; Florida; Utah	W 59–50; W 82–72; W 50–47; W 56–43; W 67–57; W 46–43
2015	First Round	Hampton	L 42–45
2016	First Round	Temple	L 66–74
2017	First Round; Second Round	Duquesne; Villanova	W 70–47; L 51–56
2018	First Round; Second Round	Robert Morris; Fordham	W 57–44; L 60–63
2019	First Round	Harvard	L 56–69
2022	First Round; Second Round; Third Round	Norfolk State; Bucknell; Seton Hall	W 54–47; W 61–58; L 71–78
2023	First Round	Fordham	L 63–73
2026	First Round	St. Bonaventure	L 67–69

== Honors ==
=== Retired jerseys ===
Drexel has retired two jersey numbers.

Drexel Dragons retired numbers
No.	Player	Position	Career
32	Barbara Yost-Alvanos	PG	1985–1988
44	Gabriela Mărginean	F	2006–2010

=== Coach of the Year ===
Colonial Athletic Association Coach Of The Year

- 2005 Denise Dillon (co-winner)
- 2009 Denise Dillon
- 2018 Denise Dillon
- 2021 Amy Mallon

=== Player of the Year ===
East Coast Conference Player of the Year

- 1983 Ethelda Makoid
- 1988 Barbara Yost

America East Conference Player of the Year

- 2001 Michelle Maslowski

Colonial Athletic Association Player of the Year

- 2009 Gabriela Mărginean
- 2019 Bailey Greenberg
- 2023 Keishana Washington

=== Rookie of the Year ===
East Coast Conference Rookie of the Year

- 1990 Debbie Lynn

America East Conference Rookie of the Year

- 1994 Jen MacNeil (formerly North Atlantic Conference)
- 2001 Katrina Martin

Colonial Athletic Association Rookie of the Year

- 2003 Catherine Scanlon
- 2007 Gabriela Mărginean
- 2018 Hannah Nihill

=== Defensive Player of the Year ===
East Coast Conference Defensive Player of the Year

- 1989–90 – Debbie Ponist

Colonial Athletic Association Defensive Player of the Year

- 2020–21 – Hannah Nihill

=== Women's National Invitation Championship All Tournament MVP ===
- 2013 Hollie Mershon

=== Philadelphia Sports Writers Association ===
See: Philadelphia Sports Writers Association § Award winners

Most Courageous

- 2008 – Nicole Hester

Outstanding Amateur Athlete

- 2009 – Gabriela Mărginean

Special Achievement

- 2013 – Denise Dillon

== See also ==
- Drexel Dragons men's basketball
