= William & Mary Tribe women's basketball =

American women's college basketball team

2025–26 William & Mary Tribe women's basketball team
- University: College of William & Mary
- Head coach: Erin Dickerson Davis (3rd season)
- Location: Williamsburg, Virginia
- Arena: Kaplan Arena (capacity: 11,300)
- Conference: Coastal Athletic Association
- Nickname: Tribe
- Colors: Green and Gold

NCAA Division I tournament appearances
- 2025

Conference tournament champions
- 2025

Uniforms
Home	Away

The William & Mary Tribe women's basketball team represents the College of William & Mary in Williamsburg, Virginia in NCAA Division I competition. The school's team competes in the Coastal Athletic Association and play their home games in Kaplan Arena.

== History ==
William & Mary began play in 1919, with NCAA Division I play beginning in 1984. The Tribe reached the CAA tournament final in 1993 but lost to Old Dominion. Their first postseason tournament appearance came in the 2015 Women's Basketball Invitational, where they lost 57–56 in the first round to the Xavier Musketeers.

In 2025, as the #9 seed in the CAA tournament, the Tribe reached the tournament final for the first time since 1993, going on to defeat Campbell, 66–63, to win their first-ever conference tournament championship. This also gave them the automatic berth into the 2025 NCAA tournament, their first-ever appearance, and the first overall NCAA tournament appearance in school history for either the men's or women's teams. Entering the NCAA tournament as one of the four lowest-ranked overall teams, the Tribe were matched up against Big South champion High Point in the First Four. Subsequently, on March 20, they defeated High Point 69–63, recording the first men's or women's March Madness win in school history, and advancing to the main field of 64. The Tribe then lost their Round of 64 matchup to #1 seed Texas 105–61, ending their March Madness run.

As of the end of the 2024–25 season, the Tribe have an all-time record of 767–1,050–9.

== Postseason history ==
=== NCAA tournament ===
William & Mary has appeared in the NCAA Division I women's basketball tournament one time, with a combined record of 1–1.

Year	Seed	Round	Opponent	Result
2025	16	First Four; First Round	(16) High Point (1) Texas	W 69–63; L 61–105

=== WBI ===
The Tribe have appeared in one Women's Basketball Invitational (WBI). Their record is 0–1.

Year	Round	Opponent	Result
2015	First Round	Xavier	L 56–57
