= UNC Wilmington Seahawks women's basketball =

UNC Wilmington Seahawks
2025–26 UNC Wilmington Seahawks women's basketball team
- University: UNC Wilmington
- First season: 1976
- Head coach: Nicole Woods (3rd season)
- Location: Wilmington, North Carolina
- Arena: Trask Coliseum (capacity: 5,200)
- Conference: Coastal Athletic Association
- Nickname: Seahawks
- Colors: Teal, gold, and navy
- Student section: Screamin' Seahawks

Uniforms
Home	Away

The UNC Wilmington Seahawks women's basketball team represents the University of North Carolina Wilmington in Wilmington, North Carolina. The team plays in the Coastal Athletic Association.

== History ==
UNCW began play in 1973. The Seahawks began as a member of the Association for Intercollegiate Athletics for Women (AIAW) in 1973–74 and spent 10 years as a member of the AIAW until the association’s disbandment following the 1982–83 season. UNCW joined the National Association of Intercollegiate Athletics (NAIA) for one season, recording a then-program best mark of 22–6 in its lone year of competition in the NAIA before joining the NCAA Division I ranks as a member of the ECAC-South Conference in 1984 (the league changed its name to the Colonial Athletic Association in 1985). They reached the CAA Finals in 2000 and 2002, falling both times to Old Dominion. They have made the postseason twice, reaching the WNIT in 2011 and 2012. They have an all-time Division I record of 379–545. As of the end of the 2015–16 season, the Seahawks have an all-time record of 488–653.
