= Northeastern Huskies women's basketball =

Northeastern Huskies
2025–26 Northeastern Huskies women's basketball team
- University: Northeastern University
- Head coach: Priscilla Edwards-Lloyd (2nd season)
- Location: Boston, Massachusetts
- Arena: Cabot Center (capacity: 1,500)
- Conference: Coastal Athletic Association
- Nickname: Huskies
- Colors: Red and black

NCAA Division I tournament appearances
- 1999

Conference tournament champions
- America East Conference: 1985, 1986, 1987, 1999

Conference regular-season champions
- America East Conference: 1985, 1986, 1987; CAA: 2023

Uniforms
Home	Away	Alternate

The Northeastern Huskies women's basketball team represents Northeastern University, located in Boston, Massachusetts, in NCAA Division I basketball competition. They compete in the Coastal Athletic Association.

== History ==
Northeastern began play in 1966. They formerly played in the America East Conference (formerly known as the Seaboard Conference) until 2005. They participated in seven of the first fifteen America East Conference women's basketball tournament finals, winning four of them, though only the last one resulted in an NCAA bid. In their only NCAA appearance, they lost to North Carolina 64-55.

2025–26 Northeastern Huskies women's basketball team
Players
Coaches

Pos.	#	Name	Height	Year	Previous school	Hometown
G	0	Nariyah Simmons	5 ft 2 in (1.57 m)	GS	Austin Peay	St. Louis, Missouri
G	1	Kailee Beaudion-Foliaki	6 ft 0 in (1.83 m)	Fr	Hightower High School	Houston, Texas
G	2	Camryn Collins	5 ft 9 in (1.75 m)	So	Rider	Foxborough, Massachusetts
G	3	Beatriz Pérez Pulgar	5 ft 7 in (1.7 m)	Fr	IES Diego Velazquez	Galapagar, Spain
F	5	Justice Tramble	6 ft 1 in (1.85 m)	So	South Carolina State	Canton, Michigan
G	11	Morgan Matthews	6 ft 0 in (1.83 m)	So	George Washington	Lawrenceville, New Jersey
G	12	Lindsey Lemay	5 ft 11 in (1.8 m)	Fr	Tilton School	Barrington, Rhode Island
F	13	Andrea Martinez	6 ft 1 in (1.85 m)	Jr	Gardner–Webb	Barcelona, Spain
F	14	Taylor Holohan	6 ft 2 in (1.88 m)	So	Averill Park High School	Averill Park, New York
G	15	Yirsy Quéliz	5 ft 4 in (1.63 m)	Jr	St. Mary's High School	La Vega, Dominican Republic
C	20	Alyssa Staten	6 ft 2 in (1.88 m)	So	Statesboro High School	Statesboro, Georgia
F	23	Maya Summerville	6 ft 0 in (1.83 m)	So	Morristown High School	Morristown, New Jersey
G	25	Natalie Larrañaga	5 ft 9 in (1.75 m)	RS Sr	Florida National	Guatemala City, Guatemala
G	33	María Sánchez Pitarch	5 ft 8 in (1.73 m)	So	Cambridge House Community College	Rocafort, Spain

Head coach

- Priscilla Edwards-Lloyd (St. Bonaventure)

Assistant coach(es)

- Sean Smith (Rutgers)
- Nicole Ambrose (Louisville)
- Jay Yve Modi (Lehman)
- Natalie Gallant (Gordon)

Legend

- (C) Team captain
- (S) Suspended
- (I) Ineligible
- (W) Walk-on
- Injured
- Current redshirt

Roster
Last update: May 28, 2026

== NCAA tournament results ==
Year	Seed	Round	Opponent	Result
1999	#13	First Round	#4 UNC	L 55−64
