= Elon Phoenix women's basketball =

| 2025–26 Elon Phoenix women's basketball team |
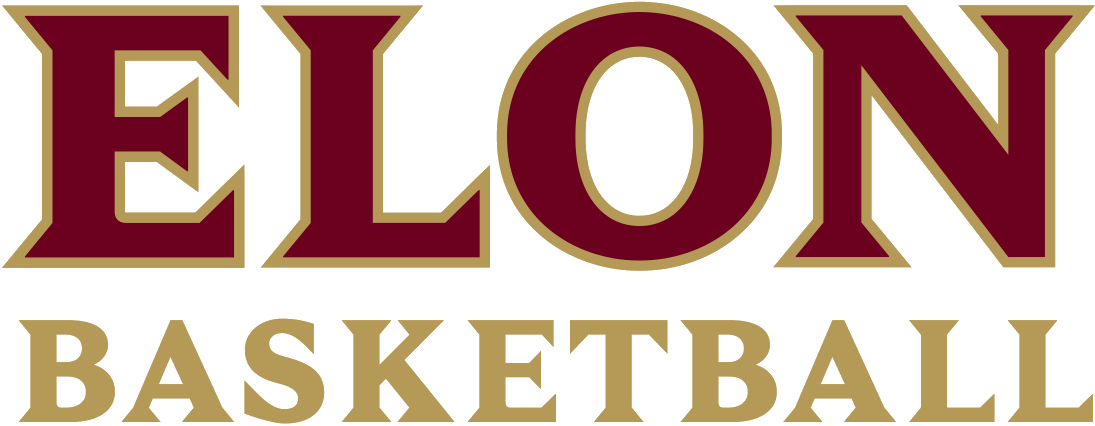
- University: Elon University
- Head coach: Charlotte Smith (15th season)
- Location: Elon, North Carolina
- Arena: Schar Center (capacity: 5,100)
- Conference: Coastal Athletic Association
- Nickname: Phoenix
- Colors: Maroon and gold

NCAA Division I tournament appearances
- 2017, 2018

Conference tournament champions
- 2017, 2018

Conference regular-season champions
- 2017

Elon Phoenix women's basketball is women's basketball program played at Elon University. They became part of the Coastal Athletic Association (CAA) on July 1, 2014.

== History ==
=== Head coaches ===
| Coach | Tenure |
|---|---|
| Kay Yow | 1971–1975 |
| Mary Jackson | 1975–1985 |
| Jackie Myers | 1985–1994 |
| Brenda Paul | 1994–2008 |
| Karen Barefoot | 2008–2011 |
| Charlotte Smith | 2011–present |

== NCAA tournament results ==
| Year | Seed | Round | Opponent | Result |
|---|---|---|---|---|
| 2017 | #11 | First Round | #6 West Virginia | L 62−75 |
| 2018 | #13 | First Round | #4 NC State | L 35−62 |

=== Conference affiliations ===
- North State Conference
- Carolinas Conference
- South Atlantic Conference
- Big South Conference
- Southern Conference
- Colonial Athletic Association

==== All-Americans ====
- 1974-75 Susan Yow
- 1979-80 Vanessa Corbett
- 1981-82 Vanessa Corbett

==== Honorable Mention All-Americans ====
- Kodak All-American

1996-97 Lakia Hayes

- Kodak All-American

1997-98 Lakia Hayes

==== Championships ====
- Conference

1981, 1982, 2017

- District

1982

- AIAW

1974
