= Coastal Athletic Association =

US collegiate athletic conference

- Formerly: ECAC South Conference (1979–1985); Colonial Athletic Association (1985–2023)
- Association: NCAA
- Founded: 1979; 47 years ago
- Commissioner: Joe D'Antonio (since 2016)
- Sports fielded: 23; men's: 10; women's: 13
- Division: Division I
- Subdivision: FCS
- No. of teams: 13 (14 in 2027)
- Headquarters: Richmond, Virginia, U.S.
- Region: East Coast
- Broadcasters: CBS Sports; FloHoops
- Website: www.caasports.com

Locations

The Coastal Athletic Association (CAA), formerly the ECAC South Conference and the Colonial Athletic Association, is a collegiate athletic conference affiliated with the NCAA's Division I whose full members are located in East Coast states, from Massachusetts to South Carolina. Most of its members are public universities, and the conference is headquartered in Richmond. The CAA was historically a Southern conference until the addition of four schools in the Northeastern United States (of five that joined from rival conference America East) after the turn of the 21st century, which added geographic balance to the conference.

The CAA was founded in 1979 as the ECAC South Conference, made up of independent schools which played basketball in the Eastern College Athletic Conference's South Region Division I men's basketball tournament. During its first two seasons, its members continued to play basketball as independents during the regular season and take part in the ECAC's South Region tournament for independents, but it began conference play in basketball in the 1981–1982 season. It was renamed the Colonial Athletic Association in 1985 when it added championships in other sports (although a number of members maintain ECAC affiliation in some sports). As of 2006, it organizes championships in 21 men's and women's sports. The addition of Northeastern University in 2005 gave the conference the NCAA minimum of six football programs needed to sponsor football. For the 2007 football season, all of the Atlantic 10 Conference's football programs joined the CAA football conference, as agreed in May 2005. The football league operates under CAA administration as the legally separate entity of CAA Football.

The most recent changes to the conference membership took place in 2022 and 2023. First, Hampton University, Monmouth University, North Carolina A&T State University, and Stony Brook University joined in 2022. Stony Brook, already a member of CAA Football, joined in other sports at that time; Hampton and Monmouth joined both the all-sports CAA and CAA Football; and NC A&T joined the all-sports CAA in 2022 and joined CAA Football in 2023. This was followed by Campbell University joining both sides of the league in 2023. The conference renamed itself the Coastal Athletic Association in 2023.

== History ==
Logo used until 2013

Coastal Athletic Association
Location of CAA members: full member, future member

The CAA has expanded in recent years, following the exits of longtime members such as the United States Naval Academy, the University of Richmond, East Carolina University, and American University. In 2001, the six-member conference added four additional universities: Towson University, Drexel University, Hofstra University, and the University of Delaware. Four years later the league expanded again when Georgia State University and Northeastern University joined, further enlarging the conference footprint. Virginia Commonwealth University (VCU) left for the Atlantic 10 Conference in July 2012. More changes came in 2013: Old Dominion University left for Conference USA, Georgia State joined the Sun Belt Conference, and the College of Charleston joined the CAA from the Southern Conference.

On the playing field, the CAA has produced 16 national team champions in six different sports (the most recent being the James Madison University Dukes who won the 2018 Division I Women's Lacrosse championship), 33 individual national champions, 11 national coaches of the year, 11 national players of the year and 12 Honda Award winners. In 2006, George Mason became the first CAA team to reach the Final Four. In 2011, the VCU Rams became the second CAA team to reach the Final Four, as well as the first team to win five games en route, due to their participation in the First Four round.

On March 25, 2013, George Mason University left the CAA to join the Atlantic 10 Conference. Shortly after, the CAA ceased sponsorship of wrestling due to the lack of teams.

The 2015–16 basketball season saw the conference RPI reach its highest rating when it finished the season ranked 9th in the nation.

During another phase of realignment that started in 2021, the CAA was affected when longtime member James Madison University announced it would leave the CAA, transition its football program to the Football Bowl Subdivision, and join the Sun Belt Conference (SBC). Initially, JMU was to join the SBC in July 2023. However, the timeline changed when the CAA chose to ban JMU from subsequent championship events, citing a conference bylaw that allows it to impose such a ban on a departing member. Thus, JMU officially joined the Sun Belt in July 2022 instead (at which time it was counted as an FBS member for scheduling purposes after meeting an NCAA minimum requirement of five FBS opponents at home), housing all of its sports in that league, including men's soccer, which would be sponsored by the SBC again, but one season earlier.

Shortly before JMU announced its departure, it was reported that the CAA sought to expand by several schools, allowing it to split into a divisional format for most of its sports in order to reduce travel costs for its members. Among the schools named as possible candidates were Fairfield University, Howard University, Monmouth University, and the University of North Carolina at Greensboro. In January 2022, reports emerged that Hampton University, a historically black institution that had been working toward a CAA move since at least 1995, would likely join the CAA that July. Monmouth was again named as a potential CAA expansion candidate. Also, Stony Brook University, already a member of CAA Football, was named as a candidate for membership in the all-sports CAA. On January 18, local media in Monmouth's home of New Jersey reported that a CAA invitation to that school was imminent.

The CAA later announced on January 25 that Hampton, Monmouth, and Stony Brook would become members of the all-sports CAA that July, with Hampton and Monmouth joining Stony Brook in CAA Football. On February 22, the CAA announced that North Carolina A&T State University would join the all-sports CAA that July and CAA Football in 2023. Still later, Campbell University was announced as a new member of both sides of the league effective in 2023.

On July 20, 2023, the Colonial Athletic Association rebranded as the Coastal Athletic Association, citing the expansion of the conference footprint throughout the east coast for the change in name; however, the current logo was unchanged.

On November 28, 2023, Delaware announced its departure from the CAA and transition to the Football Bowl Subdivision (FBS) joining Conference USA on July 1, 2025.

== Commissioners ==
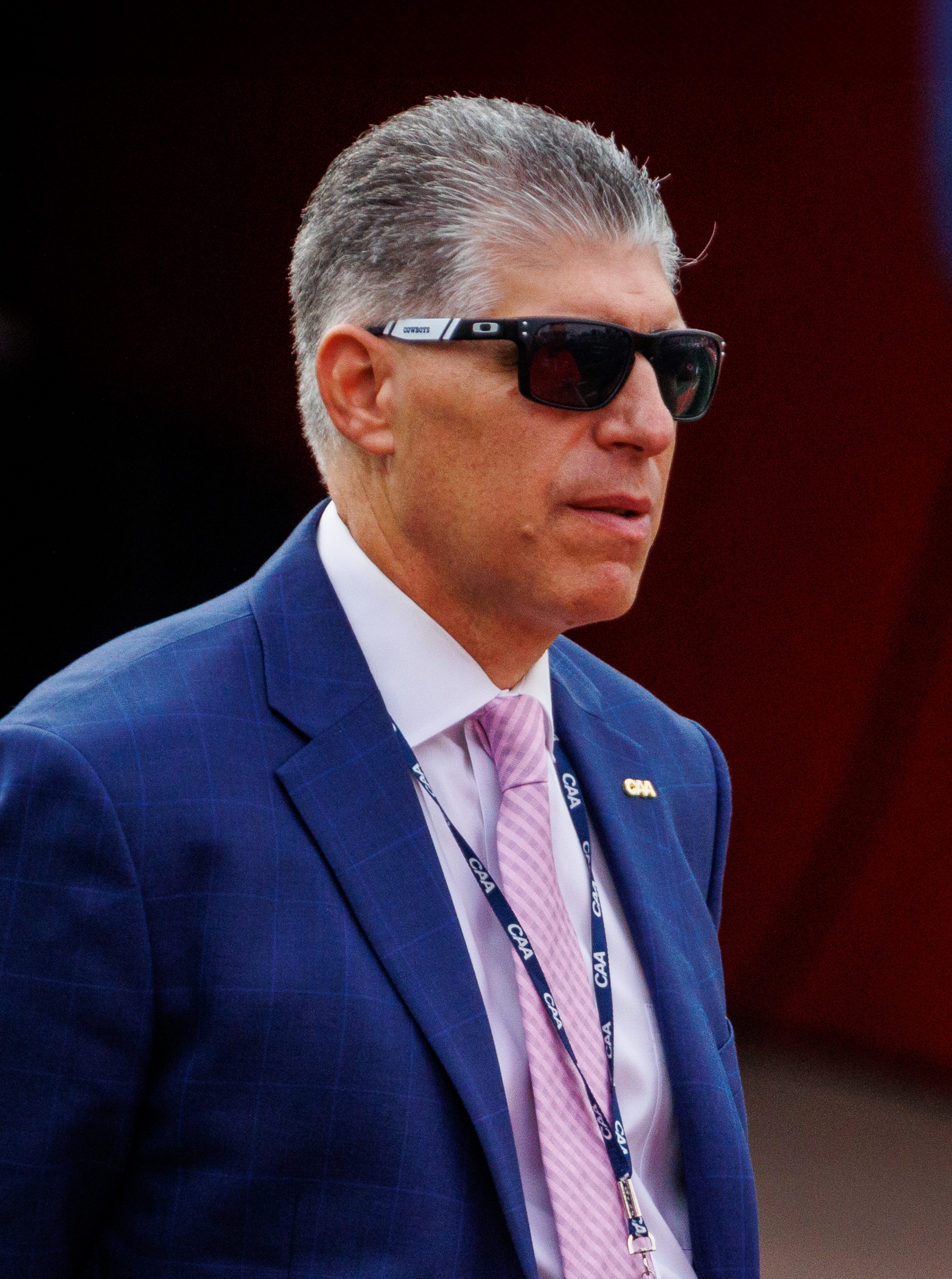
Joe D'Antonio

Name	Dates
Tom Yeager	1979–July 1, 2016
Joe D'Antonio	July 1, 2016–present

== Member schools ==
=== Full members ===
==== Current full members ====
Institution	Location	Founded	Type	Enrollment	Endowment (millions)	Nickname	Joined (Note: Represents the calendar year when fall sports competition begins.)	Colors
Campbell University (Note: Campbell previously competed in the CAA as an associate member for men's wrestling from 1996–97 to 2007–08.)	Buies Creek, North Carolina	1887	Baptist	5,622	$209.0	Fighting; Camels	2023	
College of Charleston (Note: Charleston (CofC) previously competed in the CAA as an associate member for men's and women's swimming & diving from 2003–04 to 2006–07.) (CofC, Charleston)	Charleston, South Carolina	1770	Public	10,783	$157.1	Cougars	2013	
Drexel University	Philadelphia, Pennsylvania	1891	Nonsectarian	22,412	$1,130.0	Dragons	2001	
Elon University	Elon, North Carolina	1889	Nonsectarian (Note: Has historic ties with the United Church of Christ.)	6,991	$411.5	Phoenix	2014	
Hampton University	Hampton, Virginia	1868	Nonsectarian (Note: Also a historically black college and university.)	3,516	$280.6	Pirates & Lady Pirates	2022	
Hofstra University	Hempstead, New York	1935	Nonsectarian	10,871	$955.8	Pride	2001	
Monmouth University	West Long Branch, New Jersey	1933	Nonsectarian	5,675	$153.0	Hawks	2022	
North Carolina A&T State University (North Carolina A&T)	Greensboro, North Carolina	1891	Public	13,332	$202.0	Aggies	2022 (Note: North Carolina A&T joined CAA Football in the 2023 fall season (2023–24 school year).)	
Northeastern University	Boston, Massachusetts	1898	Nonsectarian	21,627	$2,100.0	Huskies	2005	
Stony Brook University (Note: Also known as the State University of New York at Stony Brook.)	Stony Brook, New York	1957	Public	26,782	$724.4	Seawolves	2022 (Note: Stony Brook has been a member of CAA Football since the 2013 fall season (2013–14 school year).)	
Towson University	Towson, Maryland	1866	Public	22,923	$100.1	Tigers	1979; 2001 (Note: Towson joined the league as a charter member in the 1979–80 school year, left after 1980–81 to join the ECAC-Metro Conference (now known as the Northeast Conference [or NEC under its current acronym]), and rejoined the CAA in 2001–02.)	
University of North Carolina Wilmington (UNC Wilmington, UNCW)	Wilmington, North Carolina	1947	Public	17,499	$154.0	Seahawks	1984	
College of William & Mary	Williamsburg, Virginia	1693	Public	8,817	$1,890.0	Tribe	1979	

==== Future full members ====
Institution	Location	Founded	Type	Enrollment	Nickname	Joining (Note: Represents the calendar year when fall sports competition begins.)	Colors	Current primary conference
Fairfield University	Fairfield, Connecticut	1942	Catholic (Jesuit)	5,273	Stags	2027 (Note: Fairfield has competed in the CAA as an associate member for men's lacrosse since the 2015 spring season (2014–15 school year), and as an associate member for field hockey since the 2026 fall season (2026–27 school year).)		Metro

==== Former full members ====
Institution	Location	Founded	Type	Nickname	Joined (Note: Represents the calendar year when fall sports competition begins.)	Left (Note: Represents the calendar year when spring sports competition ends.)	Colors	Current conference
American University	Washington, D.C.	1893	United; Methodist	Eagles	1984	2001		Patriot
University of Baltimore	Baltimore, Maryland	1925	Public	Super Bees	1979	1981		N/A (Note: University of Baltimore dropped intercollegiate athletics after the 1982–83 academic year.)
Catholic University of America	Washington, D.C.	1887	Catholic (Pontifical)	Cardinals	1979	1981		Landmark (Note: Currently an NCAA Division III athletic conference.)
University of Delaware	Newark, Delaware	1743	Public (Note: Delaware is legally chartered as a "privately governed, state-assisted" institution. This status is broadly similar to that of New York's statutory colleges, mostly housed at Cornell University, or institutions in Pennsylvania's Commonwealth System of Higher Education (CSHE).)	Fightin'; Blue Hens	2001	2025		Conf. USA (CUSA)
East Carolina University	Greenville, North Carolina	1907	Public	Pirates	1981	2001		American
George Mason University	Fairfax, Virginia (Note: The main George Mason campus has a Fairfax mailing address, but lies in an area of unincorporated Fairfax County designated by the U.S. Census Bureau as George Mason, Virginia.)	1957	Public	Patriots	1979	2013		Atlantic 10 (A10)
Georgia State University	Atlanta, Georgia	1913	Public	Panthers	2005	2013		Sun Belt (SBC)
James Madison University	Harrisonburg, Virginia	1908	Public	Dukes	1979	2022		Sun Belt (SBC)
United States Naval Academy (Navy)	Annapolis, Maryland	1845	Federal (Military)	Midshipmen	1979	1991		Patriot
Old Dominion University	Norfolk, Virginia	1930	Public	Monarchs	1979	1982		Sun Belt (SBC)
Old Dominion University	Norfolk, Virginia	1930	Public	Monarchs	1991	2013		Sun Belt (SBC)
University of Richmond	Richmond, Virginia	1830	Private	Spiders	1979	2001		Atlantic 10 (A10)
Saint Francis University	Loretto, Pennsylvania	1847	Catholic (Franciscan)	Red Flash (Note: Saint Francis changed its nickname to Red Wolves in July 2026, coinciding with the school's move to NCAA Division III.)	1979	1981		Presidents' (PAC)
Virginia Commonwealth University (VCU)	Richmond, Virginia	1838	Public	Rams	1995	2012		Atlantic 10 (A10)

=== Associate members ===
In all tables below, dates of joining and departure reflect the calendar years these moves took effect. For spring sports, the year of arrival is the calendar year before the first season of competition. For fall sports, the year of departure is the calendar year after the final season of competition.

==== Current associate members ====
Associate member becoming a full CAA member in 2027.

Institution	Location	Founded	Type	Enrollment	Nickname	Joined (Note: Represents the calendar year when fall sports competition begins.)	Colors	CAA sport(s)	Primary conference
University at Albany (Note: Also known as the State University of New York at Albany.)	Albany, New York	1844	Public	17,746	Great Danes	2025		Women's rowing	America East (Am East)
Bryant University	Smithfield, Rhode Island	1863	Nonsectarian	3,751	Bulldogs	2025		Women's rowing	America East (AmEast)
University of Connecticut (UConn)	Storrs, Connecticut	1881	Public	32,257	Huskies	2019		Women's rowing (Note: UConn planned to drop women's rowing after the 2021 spring season (2020–21 school year), but after a federal judge issued a restraining order against the university in a Title IX lawsuit brought by team members, the university announced that it would reinstate the sport for a minimum of two years.)	Big East
Fairfield University	Fairfield, Connecticut	1942	Catholic (Jesuit)	5,273	Stags	2014		Men's lacrosse	Metro
Fairfield University	Fairfield, Connecticut	1942	Catholic (Jesuit)	5,273	Stags	2026		Field hockey	Metro
Villanova University	Villanova, Pennsylvania	1842	Catholic (Augustinian)	11,023	Wildcats	2015		Women's rowing	Big East

==== Former associate members ====
Institution	Location	Founded	Type	Nickname	Joined (Note: Represents the calendar year when fall sports competition begins.)	Left (Note: Represents the calendar year when spring sports competition ends.)	Colors	CAA sport(s)	Primary conference	Conference in former CAA sport(s)
Binghamton University (Note: Also known as the State University of New York at Binghamton. The university has publicly branded itself as "Binghamton University" since 1992.)	Vestal, New York (Note: Mailing address is Binghamton.)	1946	Public	Bearcats	2001	2013		Men's wrestling	America East (AmEast)	Eastern (EIWA)
Boston College	Chestnut Hill, Massachusetts (Note: Chestnut Hill is recognized in Massachusetts law as a village, but is not a municipal entity. The main campus straddles the boundary between the cities of Boston and Newton. BC has three other campuses—one fully in Boston, another fully in Newton, and a third fully in Brookline.)	1842	Catholic (Jesuit)	Eagles	2001	2002		Men's wrestling	Atlantic Coast (ACC)	
Boston University	Boston, Massachusetts	1839	Nonsectarian (Note: Historically affiliated with the United Methodist Church.)	Terriers	2001	2013		Men's wrestling	Patriot	N/A (Note: Boston University dropped men's wrestling after the 2013–14 school year.)
Boston University	Boston, Massachusetts	1839	Nonsectarian	Terriers	2011	2013		Women's rowing	Patriot	Patriot
University at Buffalo (Note: Also known as the State University of New York at Buffalo.)	Buffalo, New York (Note: The mailing address is Buffalo, but virtually all of the main campus is in the adjacent town of Amherst.)	1846	Public	Bulls	2008	2017		Women's rowing	Mid-American (MAC)	N/A (Note: Buffalo dropped women's rowing after the 2016–17 school year.)
Davidson College	Davidson, North Carolina	1837	Presbyterian (PCUSA)	Wildcats	2001	2007		Swimming & diving	Atlantic 10 (A-10)	
University of Dayton	Dayton, Ohio	1850	Catholic (Marianist)	Flyers	2002	2014		Women's golf	Atlantic 10 (A-10)	
Eastern Michigan University	Ypsilanti, Michigan	1849	Public	Eagles	2012	2025		Women's rowing	Mid-American (MAC)	
Liberty University	Lynchburg, Virginia	1971	Nondenominational	Flames	1991	1994		Men's wrestling	Conf. USA (CUSA)	N/A (Note: Liberty dropped men's wrestling after the 2010–11 school year.)
Loyola University Maryland	Baltimore, Maryland	1852	Catholic (Jesuit)	Greyhounds	2001	2002		Men's lacrosse	Patriot	
University of Massachusetts (UMass)	Amherst, Massachusetts	1863	Public	Minutemen	2009	2022		Men's lacrosse	Atlantic 10 (A-10)	
University of North Carolina at Greensboro (UNC Greensboro)	Greensboro, North Carolina	1891	Public	Spartans	1994	1996		Men's wrestling	Southern (SoCon)	N/A (Note: UNC Greensboro dropped men's wrestling after the 2010–11 school year.)
Pennsylvania State University (Penn State)	University Park, Pennsylvania	1855	Public (Note: As a member of Pennsylvania's Commonwealth System of Higher Education, Penn State receives state funding but is privately governed.)	Nittany Lions	2009	2014		Men's lacrosse	Big Ten	
University of Richmond	Richmond, Virginia	1830	Nonsectarian	Spiders	2002	2014		Women's golf	Atlantic 10 (A-10)	
Rider University	Lawrenceville, New Jersey	1865	Nonsectarian	Broncs	2001	2013		Men's wrestling	Metro	Mid-American (MAC)
Robert Morris University	Moon Township, Pennsylvania	1921	Nonsectarian	Colonials	2005	2009		Men's lacrosse	Horizon	Northeast (NEC)
Sacred Heart University	Fairfield, Connecticut	1963	Catholic (Diocese of Bridgeport)	Pioneers	2001	2009		Men's lacrosse	Metro	Metro
Sacred Heart University	Fairfield, Connecticut	1963	Catholic (Diocese of Bridgeport)	Pioneers	2001	2010		Men's wrestling	Metro	Eastern (EIWA)
Saint Joseph's University	Philadelphia, Pennsylvania	1851	Catholic (Jesuit)	Hawks	2010	2013		Men's lacrosse	Atlantic 10 (A-10)	
University of California, San Diego (UC San Diego, UCSD)	La Jolla, California (Note: La Jolla is a neighborhood of San Diego that has its own postal identity.)	1960	Public	Tritons	2020 (Note: While the CAA officially announced UC San Diego's entry into CAA rowing in March 2021, the Tritons competed almost right away during the 2021 spring season, part of the 2020–21 school year.)	2026		Women's rowing	Big West (BWC) (West Coast (WCC) in 2027)	West Coast (WCC)
Villanova University	Villanova, Pennsylvania	1842	Catholic (Augustinian)	Wildcats	2001	2009		Men's lacrosse	Big East (Note: Villanova men's lacrosse left the CAA once the Big East began sponsoring the sport in the 2009–10 school year. Villanova has been a CAA women's rowing member since 2015–16, and was also a CAA Football member before moving that sport to the Patriot League in 2026.)	
Virginia Polytechnic Institute and State University (Virginia Tech)	Blacksburg, Virginia	1872	Public	Hokies	1991	1998		Men's wrestling	Atlantic Coast (ACC)	
Wagner College	Staten Island, New York	1883	Lutheran ELCA	Seahawks	2001	2007		Men's wrestling	Northeast (NEC)	N/A (Note: Wagner dropped men's wrestling after the 2008–09 school year.)
Xavier University	Cincinnati, Ohio	1831	Private	Musketeers	2002	2013		Women's golf	Big East	

=== Membership timeline ===
Full member (all sports) Full member (non-football) Other Conference Other Conference

== Sports ==
The CAA sponsors championship competitions in ten men's and thirteen women's NCAA sanctioned sports. Eleven schools are associate members in three sports. This does not include football, administered by the CAA through the separate entity of CAA Football.

Coastal Athletic Association teams
Sport	Men's	Women's
Baseball	11	–
Basketball	13	13
Cross country	11	12
Field hockey	–	7
Golf	10	9
Lacrosse	7	8
Rowing	–	8
Soccer	10	12
Softball	–	11
Swimming & Diving	5	8
Tennis	10	12
Track and Field (Indoor)	8	12
Track and Field (Outdoor)	9	12
Volleyball	–	11

=== Men's sponsored sports by school ===
School	Baseball	Basketball	Cross country	Golf	Lacrosse	Soccer	Swimming & diving	Tennis	Track & field (indoor)	Track & field (outdoor)	Total CAA sports
Campbell	Yes	Yes	Yes	Yes	No	Yes	No	Yes	Yes	Yes	8
Charleston	Yes	Yes	Yes	Yes	No	Yes	No	Yes	No	No	6
Drexel	No	Yes	No	Yes	Yes	Yes	Yes	Yes	No	No	6
Elon	Yes	Yes	Yes	Yes	No	Yes	No	Yes	No	No	6
Hampton	No	Yes	Yes	No	Yes	No	No	Yes	Yes	Yes	6
Hofstra	Yes	Yes	Yes	Yes	Yes	Yes	No	Yes	Yes	Yes	8
Monmouth	Yes	Yes	Yes	Yes	Yes	Yes	Yes	Yes	Yes	Yes	10
North Carolina A&T	Yes	Yes	Yes	Yes	No	No	No	Yes	Yes	Yes	7
Northeastern	Yes	Yes	Yes	No	No	Yes	No	No	Yes	Yes	6
Stony Brook	Yes	Yes	Yes	No	Yes	Yes	No	No	Yes	Yes	7
Towson	Yes	Yes	No	Yes	Yes	No	Yes	No	No	No	5
UNC Wilmington	Yes	Yes	Yes	Yes	No	Yes	Yes	Yes	No	Yes	8
William & Mary	Yes	Yes	Yes	Yes	No	Yes	Yes	Yes	Yes	Yes	9
Totals	11	13	11	10	6+1	10	5	10	8	9	91+1
Associate members
Fairfield					Yes						1
Future full member
Fairfield	Yes	Yes	Yes	Yes	Yes	Yes	Yes	Yes	No	No	8

Men's varsity sports not sponsored by the CAA which are played by CAA schools

Future member Fairfield in green.

School	Football	Gymnastics	Ice hockey	Rowing (Note: Men's rowing is not governed by the NCAA, but instead by the Intercollegiate Rowing Association.)	Sailing (Note: Sailing is a coeducational sport sanctioned by the Intercollegiate Sailing Association and not the NCAA.)	Squash (Note: Squash is a coeducational sport that is not sanctioned by the NCAA.)	Wrestling
Campbell	CAA Football	—	—	–	–	—	SoCon
Charleston	–	—	—	—	SAISA	—	—
Drexel	–	—	—	–	—	Independent	EIWA
Elon	CAA Football	–	–	—	–	–	–
Fairfield	–	–	–	Independent	–	–	–
Hampton	CAA Football	—	—	—	MAISA	–	–
Hofstra	–	–	–	—	–	–	EIWA
Monmouth	CAA Football	–	–	—	–	—	–
North Carolina A&T	CAA Football	–	–	—	–	–	–
Northeastern	–	—	Hockey East	—	—	—	—
Stony Brook	CAA Football	–	–	—	–	–	–
Towson	CAA Football	–	–	–	—	–	–
William & Mary	Patriot	EIGL	—	—	—	—	—

=== Women's sponsored sports by school ===
School	Basketball	Cross country	Field hockey	Golf	Lacrosse	Rowing	Soccer	Softball	Swimming & diving	Tennis	Track & field (indoor)	Track & field (outdoor)	Volleyball	Total CAA sports
Campbell	Yes	Yes	No	Yes	Yes	No	Yes	Yes	Yes	Yes	Yes	Yes	Yes	11
Charleston	Yes	Yes	No	Yes	No	No	Yes	Yes	No	Yes	Yes	Yes	Yes	9
Drexel	Yes	No	Yes	No	Yes	Yes	Yes	Yes	Yes	Yes	No	No	No	8
Elon	Yes	Yes	No	Yes	Yes	No	Yes	Yes	No	Yes	Yes	Yes	Yes	10
Hampton	Yes	Yes	No	No	No	No	Yes	Yes	No	Yes	Yes	Yes	Yes	8
Hofstra	Yes	Yes	Yes	Yes	Yes	No	Yes	Yes	No	Yes	Yes	Yes	Yes	11
Monmouth	Yes	Yes	Yes	Yes	Yes	Yes	Yes	Yes	Yes	Yes	Yes	Yes	No	12
North Carolina A&T	Yes	Yes	No	Yes	No	No	No	Yes	No	Yes	Yes	Yes	Yes	8
Northeastern	Yes	Yes	Yes	No	No	Yes	Yes	No	Yes	No	Yes	Yes	Yes	9
Stony Brook	Yes	Yes	No	No	Yes	No	Yes	Yes	Yes	Yes	Yes	Yes	Yes	10
Towson	Yes	Yes	Yes	Yes	Yes	No	Yes	Yes	Yes	Yes	Yes	Yes	Yes	12
UNC Wilmington	Yes	Yes	No	Yes	No	No	Yes	Yes	Yes	Yes	Yes	Yes	Yes	10
William & Mary	Yes	Yes	Yes	Yes	Yes	No	Yes	No	Yes	Yes	Yes	Yes	Yes	11
Totals	13	12	6+1	9	8	3+4	12	11	8	12	12	12	11	126+5
Associate members
Albany						Yes								1
Bryant						Yes								1
Fairfield			Yes											1
UConn						Yes								1
Villanova						Yes								1
Future full member
Fairfield	Yes	Yes	Yes	Yes	Yes	Yes	Yes	Yes	Yes	Yes	No	No	Yes	11

Women's varsity sports not sponsored by the CAA which are played by CAA schools

School	Beach volleyball	Bowling	Equestrian (Note: Equestrianism is part of the NCAA Emerging Sports for Women program, but the national championship is sanctioned by the Intercollegiate Horse Show Association and not the NCAA. While several conferences exist under the IHSA umbrella, the NCAA treats all women's equestrian teams that do not compete within a recognized NCAA conference as independents.)	Gymnastics	Ice hockey	Sailing (Note: Sailing is a coeducational sport sanctioned by the Intercollegiate Sailing Association and not the NCAA.)	Squash (Note: Squash is a coeducational sport that is not sanctioned by the NCAA.)	Triathlon (Note: Triathlon is part of the NCAA Emerging Sports for Women program, but the national championship is sanctioned by the sport's national governing body, USA Triathlon, and not the NCAA. No NCAA conference in any division currently sponsors this sport.)
Charleston	Sun Belt	–	Independent	—	—	SAISA	—	–
Drexel	—	—	—	—	—	—	Independent	—
Hampton	—	—	—	—	—	MAISA	—	Independent
Monmouth	—	NEC	—	—	—	—	—	–
North Carolina A&T	—	MEAC	—	—	—	—	—	–
Northeastern	—	—	—	—	Hockey East	—	Independent	—
Towson	—	—	—	EAGL	—	—	—	–
UNC Wilmington	Sun Belt	—	—	—	—	—	—	–
William & Mary	—	—	—	GEC	—	—	—	–

Notes

In addition to the above, Charleston counts its female cheerleaders (though not its male cheerleaders) and all-female dance team as varsity teams. Neither cheerleading nor dance team competitions are sponsored by the NCAA.

=== Current champions ===
RS = regular-season champion; T = tournament champion

Season	Sport	Men's champion	Women's champion
Fall 2025	Cross country	Hofstra	Elon
Fall 2025	Field hockey	–	Monmouth (RS); Drexel (T)
Fall 2025	Soccer	Hofstra (RS); Elon (T)	UNCW (RS); Elon (T)
Fall 2025	Volleyball	–	Campbell & Hofstra (RS); Campbell (T)
Winter 2025–26	Basketball	UNCW (RS); Hofstra (T)	Charleston (RS & T)
Winter 2025–26	Swimming & diving	UNCW	William & Mary
Winter 2025–26	Track & field (indoor)	North Carolina A&T	Elon
Spring 2026	Baseball	Campbell (RS); Northeastern (T)	–
Spring 2026	Golf	UNCW	Charleston
Spring 2026	Lacrosse	Towson (RS); Stony Brook (T)	Stony Brook (RS & T)
Spring 2026	Rowing	–	Northeastern
Spring 2026	Softball	–	Hofstra (RS); Charleston (T)
Spring 2026	Tennis	Elon	Elon
Spring 2026	Track & field (outdoor)	North Carolina A&T	Elon

== Men's basketball ==

*	Denotes a tie for regular season conference title
†	Denotes game went into overtime

=== Regular season champions ===
Note: The conference was known as the ECAC South from 1979 to 1985.

Season	Regular season champion	Conference record
1980	Old Dominion	7–0
1981	James Madison	11–2
1982	James Madison	10–1
1983	William & Mary	9–0
1984	Richmond	7–3
1985	Navy	11–3
1986	Navy	13–1
1987	Navy	13–1
1988	Richmond	11–3
1989	Richmond	13–1
1990	James Madison	11–3
1991	James Madison	12–2
1992	Richmond	12–2
1993	James Madison	11–3
1994	Old Dominion	10–4
1995	Old Dominion	12–2
1996	VCU	14–2
1997	Old Dominion	10–6
1998*	William & Mary; UNC Wilmington	13–3
1999	George Mason	13–3
2000*	George Mason; James Madison	12–4
2001	Richmond	12–4
2002	UNC Wilmington	14–4
2003	UNC Wilmington	15–3
2004	VCU	14–4
2005	Old Dominion	15–3
2006*	George Mason; UNC Wilmington	15–3
2007	VCU	16–2
2008	VCU	15–3
2009	VCU	14–4
2010	Old Dominion	15–3
2011	George Mason	16–2
2012	Drexel	16–2
2013	Northeastern	14–4
2014	Delaware	14–2
2015*	William & Mary; UNC Wilmington; Northeastern; James Madison	12–6
2016*	Hofstra; UNC Wilmington	14–4
2017	UNC Wilmington	15–3
2018*	Charleston; Northeastern	14–4
2019	Hofstra	15–3
2020	Hofstra	14–4
2021*	James Madison; Northeastern	8–2
2022*	Towson; UNC Wilmington	15–3
2023*	Hofstra; Charleston	16–2
2024	Charleston	15–3
2025	Towson	16–2
2026	UNCW	15–3

=== History of the tournament final ===
Year	CAA Champions	Score	Runner-up	Tournament MVP	Venue
1980	Old Dominion	62–51^{†}	Navy	Mark West, Old Dominion	Hampton Coliseum (Hampton, Virginia)
1981	James Madison	69–60	Richmond	Charles Fisher, James Madison	Hampton Coliseum (Hampton, Virginia)
1982	Old Dominion	58–57	James Madison	Mark West (2), Old Dominion	Norfolk Scope (Norfolk, Virginia)
1983	James Madison	41–38	William & Mary	Derek Steele, James Madison	Robins Center (Richmond, Virginia)
1984	Richmond	74–55	Navy	Johnny Newman, Richmond	Convocation Center (Harrisonburg, Virginia)
1985	Navy	85–76	Richmond	Vernon Butler, Navy	William & Mary Hall (Williamsburg, Virginia)
1986	Navy	72–61	George Mason	David Robinson, Navy	Patriot Center (Fairfax, Virginia)
1987	Navy	53–50	James Madison	David Robinson (2), Navy	Hampton Coliseum (Hampton, Virginia)
1988	Richmond	73–70	George Mason	Peter Wollfolk, Richmond	Hampton Coliseum (Hampton, Virginia)
1989	George Mason	78–72^{†}	UNC Wilmington	Kenny Sanders, George Mason	Hampton Coliseum (Hampton, Virginia)
1990	Richmond	77–72	James Madison	Kenny Atkinson, Richmond	Richmond Coliseum (Richmond, Virginia)
1991	Richmond	81–78	George Mason	Jim Shields, Richmond	Richmond Coliseum (Richmond, Virginia)
1992	Old Dominion	78–73	James Madison	Ricardo Leonard, Old Dominion	Richmond Coliseum (Richmond, Virginia)
1993	East Carolina	54–49	James Madison	Lester Lyons, East Carolina	Richmond Coliseum (Richmond, Virginia)
1994	James Madison	77–76	Old Dominion	Odell Hodge, Old Dominion	Richmond Coliseum (Richmond, Virginia)
1995	Old Dominion	80–75	James Madison	Petey Sessoms, Old Dominion	Richmond Coliseum (Richmond, Virginia)
1996	VCU	46–43	UNC Wilmington	Bernard Hopkins, VCU	Richmond Coliseum (Richmond, Virginia)
1997	Old Dominion	62–58	James Madison	Odell Hodge (2), Old Dominion	Richmond Coliseum (Richmond, Virginia)
1998	Richmond	79–64	UNC Wilmington	Daryl Oliver, Richmond	Richmond Coliseum (Richmond, Virginia)
1999	George Mason	63–58	Old Dominion	George Evans, George Mason	Richmond Coliseum (Richmond, Virginia)
2000	UNC Wilmington	57–47	Richmond	Brett Blizzard, UNC Wilmington	Richmond Coliseum (Richmond, Virginia)
2001	George Mason	35–33	UNC Wilmington	Erik Herring, George Mason	Richmond Coliseum (Richmond, Virginia)
2002	UNC Wilmington	66–51	VCU	Brett Blizzard (2), UNC Wilmington	Richmond Coliseum (Richmond, Virginia)
2003	UNC Wilmington	70–62	Drexel	Brett Blizzard (3), UNC Wilmington	Richmond Coliseum (Richmond, Virginia)
2004	VCU	55–54	George Mason	Domonic Jones, VCU	Richmond Coliseum (Richmond, Virginia)
2005	Old Dominion	73–66^{†}	VCU	Alex Loughton, Old Dominion	Richmond Coliseum (Richmond, Virginia)
2006	UNC Wilmington	78–67	Hofstra	T. J. Carter, UNC Wilmington	Richmond Coliseum (Richmond, Virginia)
2007	VCU	65–59	George Mason	Eric Maynor, VCU	Richmond Coliseum (Richmond, Virginia)
2008	George Mason	68–59	William & Mary	Folarin Campbell, George Mason	Richmond Coliseum (Richmond, Virginia)
2009	VCU	71–50	George Mason	Eric Maynor (2), VCU	Richmond Coliseum (Richmond, Virginia)
2010	Old Dominion	60–53	William & Mary	Gerald Lee, Old Dominion	Richmond Coliseum (Richmond, Virginia)
2011	Old Dominion	70–65	VCU	Frank Hassell, Old Dominion	Richmond Coliseum (Richmond, Virginia)
2012	VCU	59–56	Drexel	Darius Theus, VCU	Richmond Coliseum (Richmond, Virginia)
2013	James Madison	70–57	Northeastern	A. J. Davis, James Madison	Richmond Coliseum (Richmond, Virginia)
2014	Delaware	75–74	William & Mary	Jarvis Threatt, Delaware	Baltimore Arena (Baltimore, Maryland)
2015	Northeastern	72–61	William & Mary	Quincy Ford, Northeastern	Royal Farms Arena (Baltimore, Maryland)
2016	UNC Wilmington	80–73^{†}	Hofstra	Chris Flemmings, UNC Wilmington	Royal Farms Arena (Baltimore, Maryland)
2017	UNC Wilmington	78–69	Charleston	C. J. Bryce, UNC Wilmington	North Charleston Coliseum (North Charleston, South Carolina)
2018	Charleston	83–76^{†}	Northeastern	Grant Riller, Charleston	North Charleston Coliseum (North Charleston, South Carolina)
2019	Northeastern	82–74	Hofstra	Vasa Pusica, Northeastern	North Charleston Coliseum (North Charleston, South Carolina)
2020	Hofstra	70–61	Northeastern	Desure Buie, Hofstra	Entertainment and Sports Arena (Washington, D.C.)
2021	Drexel	63–56	Elon	Camren Wynter, Drexel	Atlantic Union Bank Center (Harrisonburg, VA)
2022	Delaware	59–55	UNC Wilmington	Jyare Davis, Delaware	Entertainment and Sports Arena (Washington, D.C.)
2023	Charleston	63–58	UNC Wilmington	Ryan Larson, Charleston	Entertainment and Sports Arena (Washington, D.C.)
2024	Charleston	82–79^{†}	Stony Brook	Reyne Smith, Charleston	Entertainment and Sports Arena (Washington, D.C.)
2025	UNC Wilmington	76–72	Delaware	Donovan Newby, UNC Wilmington	CareFirst Arena (Washington, D.C.)
2026	Hofstra	75–69	Monmouth	Preston Edmead, Hofstra	CareFirst Arena (Washington, D.C.)

=== Men's CAA tournament championships and finalists ===
School	Championships	Finals Appearances	Years
Old Dominion^{‡}	8	10	1980, 1982, 1992, 1995, 1997, 2005, 2010, 2011
UNC Wilmington	7	13	2000, 2002, 2003, 2006, 2016, 2017, 2025
Richmond^{‡}	5	8	1984, 1988, 1990, 1991, 1998
VCU^{‡}	5	8	1996, 2004, 2007, 2009, 2012
James Madison^{‡}	4	11	1981, 1983, 1994, 2013
George Mason^{‡}	4	10	1989, 1999, 2001, 2008
Charleston	3	4	2018, 2023, 2024
Navy^{‡}	3	5	1985, 1986, 1987
Northeastern	2	5	2015, 2019
Delaware	2	3	2014, 2022
Hofstra	2	5	2020, 2026
Drexel	1	2	2021
East Carolina^{‡}	1	1	1993
William & Mary	0	5	—
Elon	0	1	—
Stony Brook	0	1	—
Campbell	0	0	—
Hampton	0	0	—
Monmouth	0	0	—
North Carolina A&T	0	0	—
Towson	0	0	—

^{‡}Former member of the CAA

== Women's basketball ==
*	Denotes a tie for regular season conference title
†	Denotes game went into overtime

=== Regular season champions ===
Season	Regular season champion	Conference Record
1984	Richmond	4–1
1985	East Carolina	11–1
1986	James Madison	11–1
1987	James Madison	12–0
1988	James Madison	12–0
1989	James Madison	12–0
1990	Richmond	11–1
1991	James Madison	11–1
1992	Old Dominion	12–2
1993	Old Dominion	14–0
1994	Old Dominion	14–0
1995	Old Dominion	13–1
1996	Old Dominion	16–0
1997	Old Dominion	16–0
1998	Old Dominion	16–0
1999	Old Dominion	16–0
2000	Old Dominion	16–0
2001	Old Dominion	15–1
2002	Old Dominion	18–0
2003	Old Dominion	15–3
2004	Old Dominion	14–4
2005	Delaware	16–2
2006	Old Dominion	17–1
2007	Old Dominion	17–1
2008	Old Dominion	17–1
2009	Drexel	16–2
2010	Old Dominion	14–4
2011	James Madison	16–2
2012	Delaware	18–0
2013	Delaware	18–0
2014	James Madison	15–1
2015	James Madison	17–1
2016	James Madison	17–1
2017	Elon	16–2
2018*	Drexel; James Madison	16–2
2019	James Madison	17–1
2020*	Drexel; James Madison	16–2
2021	Delaware	16–2
2022	Drexel	16–2
2023*	Towson; Drexel; Northeastern	13–5
2024	Stony Brook	16–2
2025	North Carolina A&T	15–3
2026	Charleston	16–2

=== History of the tournament finals ===
Year	CAA Champions	Score	Runner-up	Tournament MVP	Venue
1984	East Carolina	54–39	Richmond	N/A	Minges Coliseum (Greenville, North Carolina)
1985	East Carolina	65–59	James Madison	N/A	William & Mary Hall (Williamsburg, Virginia)
1986	James Madison	66–62	East Carolina	Lisa Squirewell, ECU	Trask Coliseum (Wilmington, North Carolina)
1987	James Madison	74–62	American	Sydney Beasley, JMU	JMU Convocation Center (Harrisonburg, Virginia)
1988	James Madison	87–72	George Mason	Sydney Beasley, JMU	Bender Arena (Washington, D.C.)
1989	James Madison	55–45	Richmond	Carolin Dehn-Duhr, JMU	William & Mary Hall (Williamsburg, Virginia)
1990	Richmond	47–46	James Madison	Pam Bryant, UR	Robins Center (Richmond, Virginia)
1991	Richmond	88–70	East Carolina	Ginny Norton, UR	JMU Convocation Center (Harrisonburg, Virginia)
1992	Old Dominion	80–75	East Carolina	Pam Huntley, ODU	ODU Field House (Norfolk, Virginia)
1993	Old Dominion	65–51	William & Mary	Pam Huntley, ODU	ODU Field House (Norfolk, Virginia)
1994	Old Dominion	78–61	George Mason	Celeste Hill, ODU	JMU Convocation Center (Harrisonburg, Virginia)
1995	Old Dominion	63–44	James Madison	Ticha Penicheiro, ODU	ODU Field House (Norfolk, Virginia)
1996	Old Dominion	84–58	James Madison	Clarisse Machanguana, ODU	ODU Field House (Norfolk, Virginia)
1997	Old Dominion	83–46	East Carolina	Clarisse Machanguana, ODU	Richmond Coliseum (Richmond, Virginia)
1998	Old Dominion	82–49	American	Ticha Penicheiro, ODU	Richmond Coliseum (Richmond, Virginia)
1999	Old Dominion	73–67	East Carolina	Natalie Diaz, ODU	Robins Center (Richmond, Virginia)
2000	Old Dominion	92–49	UNC Wilmington	Natalie Diaz, ODU	ALLTEL Pavilion (Richmond, Virginia)
2001	Old Dominion	66–62	James Madison	Monique Coker, ODU	ODU Field House (Norfolk, Virginia)
2002	Old Dominion	76–48	UNC Wilmington	Okeisha Howard, ODU	ODU Field House (Norfolk, Virginia)
2003	Old Dominion	66–58	Delaware	Shareese Grant, ODU	Ted Constant Convocation Center (Norfolk, Virginia)
2004	Old Dominion	85–81	George Mason	Shareese Grant, ODU	Ted Constant Convocation Center (Norfolk, Virginia)
2005	Old Dominion	78–74^{†}	Delaware	Shareese Grant, ODU	Patriot Center (Fairfax, Virginia)
2006	Old Dominion	58–54	James Madison	T. J. Jordan, ODU	Patriot Center (Fairfax, Virginia)
2007	Old Dominion	78–70	James Madison	T. J. Jordan, ODU	Bob Carpenter Center (Newark, Delaware)
2008	Old Dominion	74–51	VCU	Shahida Williams, ODU	Bob Carpenter Center (Newark, Delaware)
2009	Drexel	64–58	James Madison	Gabriela Marginean, Drexel	JMU Convocation Center (Harrisonburg, Virginia)
2010	James Madison	67–53	Old Dominion	Dawn Evans, JMU	JMU Convocation Center (Harrisonburg, Virginia)
2011	James Madison	67–61	Delaware	Dawn Evans, JMU	The Show Place Arena (Upper Marlboro, Maryland)
2012	Delaware	59–43	Drexel	Elena Delle Donne, UD	The Show Place Arena (Upper Marlboro, Maryland)
2013	Delaware	59–56	Drexel	Elena Delle Donne, UD	The Show Place Arena (Upper Marlboro, Maryland)
2014	James Madison	70–45	Delaware	Jazmon Gwathmey, JMU	The Show Place Arena (Upper Marlboro, Maryland)
2015	James Madison	62–56	Hofstra	Jazmon Gwathmey, JMU	The Show Place Arena (Upper Marlboro, Maryland)
2016	James Madison	60–46	Drexel	Jazmon Gwathmey, JMU	The Show Place Arena (Upper Marlboro, Maryland)
2017	Elon	78–60	James Madison	Lauren Brown, Elon	JMU Convocation Center (Harrisonburg, Virginia)
2018	Elon	57–45	Drexel	Shay Burnett, Elon	Daskalakis Athletic Center (Philadelphia)
2019	Towson	53–49	Drexel	Nukiya Mayo, Towson	Bob Carpenter Center (Newark, Delaware)
2020	Tournament canceled after the opening round due to the COVID-19 pandemic				Schar Center (Elon, North Carolina)
2021	Drexel	63–52	Delaware	Keishana Washington, Drexel	Schar Center (Elon, North Carolina)
2022	Delaware	63–59	Drexel	Jasmine Dickey, UD	Daskalakis Athletic Center (Philadelphia)
2023	Monmouth	80–55	Towson	Bri Tinsley, Monmouth	SECU Arena (Towson, Maryland)
2024	Drexel	68–60	Stony Brook	Amaris Baker, Drexel	Entertainment and Sports Arena (Washington, D.C.)
2025	William & Mary	66–63	Campbell	Bella Nascimento, William & Mary	CareFirst Arena (Washington, D.C.)
2026	Charleston	68–56	Hofstra	Taryn Barbot, Charleston	CareFirst Arena (Washington, D.C.)

=== Women's CAA tournament championships and finalists ===
School	Championships	Finals Appearances	Years
Old Dominion^{‡}	17	18	1992, 1993, 1994, 1995, 1996, 1997, 1998, 1999, 2000, 2001, 2002, 2003, 2004, 2005, 2006, 2007, 2008
James Madison^{‡}	9	17	1986, 1987, 1988, 1989, 2010, 2011, 2014, 2015, 2016
Drexel	3	9	2009, 2021, 2024
Delaware	3	8	2012, 2013, 2022
East Carolina^{‡}	2	6	1984, 1985
Richmond^{‡}	2	4	1990, 1991
Elon	2	2	2017, 2018
Towson	1	2	2019
Monmouth	1	1	2023
William & Mary	1	2	2025
Charleston	1	1	2026
American^{‡}	0	2	—
George Mason^{‡}	0	3	—
UNC Wilmington	0	2	—
Campbell	0	1	—
Stony Brook	0	1	—
VCU^{‡}	0	1	—
Hampton	0	0	—
North Carolina A&T	0	0	—
Northeastern	0	0	—

^{‡}Former member of the CAA

== Men's soccer ==
=== Regular season champions ===
Note: The conference was known as the ECAC South from 1983 to 1985.

List of CAA regular season champions.

Season	Regular season champion	Conference Record
1983	George Mason	4–1–0
1984	American	5–0–2
1985	American	6–1–0
1986	George Mason	5–0–2
1987	William & Mary	6–1–0
1988	Navy	5–1–1
1989	George Mason	6–0–1
1990	George Mason	6–1–0
1991	James Madison	6–1–0
1992	William & Mary	5–0–2
1993	James Madison	7–0–0
1994	James Madison	6–0–1
1995	William & Mary	6–2–0
1996	William & Mary	8–0–0
1997	American	6–0–2
1998	VCU	7–0–1
1999	Old Dominion	7–1–0
2000	James Madison	7–1–0
2001	Old Dominion	3–0–2
2002	VCU	7–1–1
2003	VCU	8–1–0
2004	VCU	7–1–1
2005	Old Dominion	9–1–1
2006	Towson	10–0–1
2007	Drexel	8–2–1
2008	UNC Wilmington	7–4–0
2009	UNC Wilmington	8–0–3
2010	William & Mary	8–1–2
2011	James Madison	8–3–0
2012	Drexel	8–1–1
2013	Drexel	4–1–2
2014	Delaware, Hofstra & UNCW	5–2–1
2015	Elon & Hofstra	6–2–0
2016	Hofstra	7–1–0
2017	James Madison	5–1–2
2018	James Madison	6–2
2019	UNC Wilmington	7–0–1
2020–21	North Division: Hofstra	2–0–2
2020–21	South Division: James Madison	4–0–0
2021	Hofstra	5–1–2
2022	Elon	6–1–2
2023	Hofstra & Monmouth	5–1–2
2024	Elon	6–2
2025	North Division: Hofstra	7–1–0
2025	South Division: Elon	4–1–3

=== All-time conference championships ===
School	Championships	Outright Championships	Years
James Madison ‡	7	7	1991, 1993, 1994, 2000, 2011, 2017, 2018
Hofstra	6	3	2014, 2015, 2016, 2021, 2023, 2025
UNC Wilmington	4	3	2008, 2009, 2014, 2019
Elon	3	0	2015, 2022, 2025
Towson	2	1	2011, 2012
Villanova ‡	2	0	2009, 2012
William & Mary	2	0	2010, 2015
Delaware	1	0	2010
Monmouth	1	0	2023
Massachusetts ‡	1	0	2007

Note: In the 2020–21 season, impacted by COVID-10, the CAA split into North and South Divisions, with conference play solely within each division, for that season only. No champion is included for this season.

== Facilities ==
School	Basketball arena (Nickname)	Capacity	Baseball park	Capacity
Campbell	Gore Arena	3,095	Jim Perry Stadium	1,250
Charleston	TD Arena	5,100	CofC Baseball Stadium at Patriot's Point	2,000
Drexel	Daskalakis Athletic Center (The "DAC")	2,509	Non-baseball school	
Elon	Schar Center	5,100	Walter C. Latham Park	500
Fairfield	Leo D. Mahoney Arena	3,500	Alumni Baseball Diamond	600
Hampton	Hampton Convocation Center	6,000	Non-baseball school	
Hofstra	Mack Sports Complex (The "Mack")	5,124	University Field	400
Monmouth	OceanFirst Bank Center	4,100	Monmouth Baseball Field	400*
North Carolina A&T	Corbett Sports Center	5,000	War Memorial Stadium	7,500
Northeastern	Cabot Center (Note: Matthews Arena, previously home to Northeastern's men's team, hosted its last basketball game in November 2025 and closed the next month. It was demolished and will be replaced on-site by a multipurpose facility, planned to open in 2028, that will include a new arena (5,300 capacity for basketball).)	2,500	Parsons Field	3,000
Stony Brook	Island Federal Credit Union Arena	4,160	Joe Nathan Field	1,000
Towson	TU Arena	5,200	John B. Schuerholz Baseball Complex	500
UNC Wilmington	Trask Coliseum	5,200	Brooks Field	3,500
William & Mary	Kaplan Arena	8,600	Plumeri Park	1,000
