= Towson Tigers women's basketball =

Towson Tigers
2026–27 Towson Tigers women's basketball team
- University: Towson University
- Head coach: Laura Harper (5th season)
- Location: Towson, Maryland
- Arena: SECU Arena (capacity: 5,200)
- Conference: Coastal Athletic Association
- Nickname: Tigers
- Colors: Black and gold

NCAA Division I tournament appearances
- 2019

Conference tournament champions
- 2019

Conference regular-season champions
- 2023

Uniforms
Home	Away	Alternate

The Towson Tigers women's basketball team represents Towson University in Towson, Maryland in NCAA Division I competition. The school's team currently competes in the Coastal Athletic Association (CAA) and play their home games at SECU Arena.

== History ==
Towson began play in 1967. They played in MAIAW Division II from 1967 to 1982 before joining the East Coast Conference in 1982. They played in the Big South Conference from 1992 to 1995 and the America East Conference from 1995 to 2001 before joining the CAA in 2001. They made the WBI in 2010, their first ever postseason appearance. As of the end of the 2021–22 season, the Tigers have an all-time record of 631–709.

== Year by year results ==
Conference tournament winners noted

Season	Team	Overall	Conference	Standing	Postseason	Coaches' poll	AP poll
Margo VerKruzen (Independent) (1967–1969)
1967–68	Margo VerKruzen	5–2	–				
1968–69	Margo VerKruzen	10–1	–		NWIT		
Margo VerKruzen:		15–3	–				
Darlene Kelly (Independent) (1969–1972)
1969–70	Darlene Kelly	9–3	–				
1970–71	Darlene Kelly	14–2	–				
1971–72	Darlene Kelly	9–5	–				
Darlene Kelly:		32–10	–				
Ellen Eason (Independent) (1972–1975)
1972–73	Ellen Eason	11–4	–				
1973–74	Ellen Eason	10–5	–				
1974–75	Ellen Eason	8–10	–				
Ellen Eason:		29–19	–				
Rita Yerkes (Independent) (1975–1979)
1975–76	Rita Yerkes	5–11	–				
1976–77	Rita Yerkes	11–11	–		MAIAW Champions		
1977–78	Rita Yerkes	15–7	–		EAIAW Regional Champions		
1978–79	Rita Yerkes	17–11	–		EAIAW Regional Champions		
Rita Yerkes:		48–40	–				
Breezy Bishop (Independent, ECC) (1979–1983)
1979–80	Breezy Bishop	16–8	–		EAIAW Regional Bid		
1980–81	Breezy Bishop	6–18	–				
1981–82	Breezy Bishop	15–8	–				
1982–83	Breezy Bishop	15–9	5–4	3rd			
Breezy Bishop:		52–43	–				
Sheilah Collins (ECC) (1983–1988)
1983–84	Sheilah Collins	19–8	6–2	2nd			
1984–85	Sheilah Collins	17–12	10–4	4th			
1985–86	Sheilah Collins	14–14	6–8	5th			
1986–87	Sheilah Collins	13–13	7–7	5th			
1987–88	Sheilah Collins	12–15	3–11	7th			
Sheilah Collins:		54–62	–				
Ellen Fitzkee (ECC, Big South, America East) (1988–2001)
1988–89	Ellen Fitzkee	13–12	7–7	3rd			
1989–90	Ellen Fitzkee	11–16	6–8	5th			
1990–91	Ellen Fitzkee	8–19	4–8	5th			
1991–92	Ellen Fitzkee	11–18	3–9	7th			
1992–93	Ellen Fitzkee	12–16	8–6	4th			
1993–94	Ellen Fitzkee	17–11	11–7	3rd			
1994–95	Ellen Fitzkee	15–13	13–3	2nd			
1995–96	Ellen Fitzkee	8–19	5–13	9th			
1996–97	Ellen Fitzkee	11–17	6–12	7th			
1997–98	Ellen Fitzkee	15–13	10–8	4th			
1998–99	Ellen Fitzkee	12–16	6–12	6th			
1999–2000	Ellen Fitzkee	9–19	7–11	7th			
2000–01	Ellen Fitzkee	3–25	2–16	10th			
Ellen Fitzkee:		155–214	–				
Joe Matthews (CAA) (2001–2013)
2001–02	Joe Matthews	2–26	1–17	10th			
2002–03	Joe Matthews	3–25	2–16	10th			
2003–04	Joe Matthews	9–19	1–17	10th			
2004–05	Joe Matthews	16–14	9–9	5th			
2005–06	Joe Matthews	9–19	4–14	10th			
2006–07	Joe Matthews	17–12	8–10	7th			
2007–08	Joe Matthews	22–10	12–6	5th			
2008–09	Joe Matthews	17–13	8–10	8th			
2009–10	Joe Matthews	15–16	9–9	7th	WBI First Round		
2010–11	Joe Matthews	9–21	3–15	11th			
2011–12	Joe Matthews	16–14	7–11	9th			
2012–13	Joe Matthews	12–18	6–12	7th			
Joe Matthews:		147–207	–				
Niki Reid Geckeler (CAA) (2013–2017)
2013–14	Niki Reid Geckeler	13–17	7–9	6th			
2014–15	Niki Reid Geckeler	11–21	6–12	8th			
2015–16	Niki Reid Geckeler	7–24	3–15	10th			
2016–17	Niki Reid Geckeler	12–18	5–13	9th			
Niki Reid Geckeler:		43–80	–				
Diane Richardson (CAA) (2017–2022)
2017–18	Diane Richardson	9–21	4–14	9th			
2018–19	Diane Richardson	20–13	11–7	T–3rd	NCAA First Round		
2019–20	Diane Richardson	14–15	9–9	4th			
2020–21	Diane Richardson	13–9	8–6	T–3rd			
2021–22	Diane Richardson	24–18	14–4	3rd	WNIT First Round		
Diane Richardson:		80–76	–				
Laura Harper (CAA) (2022–present)
2022–23	Laura Harper	21–12	13–5	T–1st	WNIT First Round		
Total:		676–766 (.469)					
National champion Postseason invitational champion Conference regular season champion Conference regular season and conference tournament champion Division regular season champion Division regular season and conference tournament champion Conference tournament champion

== NCAA tournament results ==
Year	Seed	Round	Opponent	Result
2019	#15	First Round	#2 UConn	L 61−110

== WNIT results ==
Year	Round	Opponent	Result
2022	First Round	Old Dominion	L 66–72
2023	First Round	Harvard	L 63–103

== WBI results ==
Year	Seed	Round	Opponent	Result
2010	#4	First Round	#5 Fairfield	L 55–69
