= 2023–24 UIC Flames women's basketball team =

American college basketball season

2023–24 UIC Flames women's basketball

WNIT, first round
- Conference: Missouri Valley Conference
- Record: 18–16 (10–10 MVC)
- Head coach: Ashleen Bracey (2nd season)
- Assistant coaches: Mike Donovan; Caprice Smith; Remy Lory; Shavonda Price; Josie Filer
- Home arena: Credit Union 1 Arena

2023–24 Missouri Valley Conference women's basketball standings
	Conf.				Overall
Team	W		L	PCT	W		L	PCT
Drake †	19	–	1	.950	29	–	6	.829
Belmont	17	–	3	.850	26	–	9	.743
Missouri State	15	–	5	.750	23	–	10	.697
Northern Iowa	14	–	6	.700	16	–	16	.500
Illinois State	13	–	7	.650	22	–	12	.647
Murray State	12	–	8	.600	20	–	12	.625
UIC	10	–	10	.500	18	–	16	.529
Southern Illinois	6	–	14	.300	11	–	20	.355
Indiana State	6	–	14	.300	11	–	21	.344
Valparaiso	4	–	16	.200	5	–	25	.167
Bradley	2	–	18	.100	6	–	26	.188
Evansville	2	–	18	.100	4	–	28	.125
† 2024 MVC tournament winner

The 2023–24 UIC Flames women's basketball team represented the University of Illinois Chicago during the 2023–24 NCAA Division I women's basketball season. The Flames, led by second-year head coach Ashleen Bracey, played their home games at Credit Union 1 Arena in Chicago, Illinois as members of the Missouri Valley Conference (MVC).

== Previous season ==
The Flames finished the 2022–23 season 19–17, 9–11 in MVC play, to finish in sixth place. They defeated Valparaiso in the opening round of the MVC tournament, before falling to Northern Iowa in the quarterfinals. They received an invitation into the WBI, where they lost in the first round to New Mexico State and FIU in the consolation round, before defeating Northern Illinois in the 7th-place game.

== Roster ==
2023–24 UIC Flames women's basketball team
Players
Coaches

Pos.	#	Name	Height	Year	Previous school	Hometown
G	0	Keona Schenck	5 ft 6 in (1.68 m)	Sr	Franklin High School	Somerset, NJ
G	1	Kristian Young	5 ft 5 in (1.65 m)	Sr	Lawrence North High School	Indianapolis, IN
C	2	Tara Green	6 ft 3 in (1.91 m)	Sr	New Orleans	West Helena, AR
G	3	Sara Zabrecky	5 ft 9 in (1.75 m)	Sr	St. John's	Munster, IN
F	4	Jaida McCloud	6 ft 3 in (1.91 m)	Sr	Richwoods High School	Peoria, IL
SF	5	Ky Dempsey-Toney	6 ft 2 in (1.88 m)	Jr	Franklin High School	Franklin, NJ
G	10	Dais'Ja Trotter	5 ft 9 in (1.75 m)	GS	Cincinnati	Louisville, KY
G	13	Bailey Lutes	5 ft 8 in (1.73 m)	Jr	Cuba City High School	Cuba City, WI
G	14	Krystyna Ellew	5 ft 10 in (1.78 m)	Jr	Wisconsin	Chicago, IL
G	15	Erin Henry	5 ft 8 in (1.73 m)	Fr	Example Academy	Plainfield, IL
G	20	Sandra Frau-Garcia	5 ft 7 in (1.7 m)	Jr	Casper College	Pego, Spain
F	22	Keimari Rimmer	5 ft 10 in (1.78 m)	GS	DePaul	Chicago, IL
G/F	23	Makiyah Williams	6 ft 0 in (1.83 m)	Jr	Marquette	Chicago, IL
G	24	Megen Sanaj	5 ft 7 in (1.7 m)	Fr	Latin School of Chicago	Chicago, IL
G	25	Danyel Middleton	5 ft 10 in (1.78 m)	Sr	Marquette	Chicago, IL
G	35	Dylan Van Fleet	5 ft 7 in (1.7 m)	Sr	Morton College	Des Plaines, IL

Head coach

- Ashleen Bracey (Illinois State)

Assistant coach(es)

- Mike Donovan (Illinois State)
- Caprice Smith (DePaul)
- Remy Lory (Southeastern)
- Shavonda Price (Johnson C. Smith)
- Josie Filer (UIC)

Legend

- (C) Team captain
- (S) Suspended
- (I) Ineligible
- (W) Walk-on
- Injured
- Current redshirt

Roster
Last update: March 5, 2024

== Schedule and results ==
Date time, TV	Rank^{#}	Opponent^{#}	Result	Record	Site (attendance) city, state
Exhibition
October 30, 2023*; 7:00 p.m.		Parkside	W 94–73	–	Credit Union 1 Arena (–); Chicago, IL
Non-conference regular season
November 6, 2023*; 6:00 p.m., ESPN+		at Loyola Chicago	W 67–51	1–0	Joseph J. Gentile Arena (508); Chicago, IL
November 9, 2023*; 7:00 p.m., B1G+		at Northwestern	L 86–92 ^{OT}	1–1	Welsh–Ryan Arena (1,623); Evanston, IL
November 12, 2023*; 2:00 p.m., ESPN+		at Milwaukee	W 73–70	2–1	Klotsche Center (617); Milwaukee, WI
November 17, 2023*; 7:00 p.m., ESPN+		Southeast Missouri State	W 87–74	3–1	Credit Union 1 Arena (1,204); Chicago, IL
November 19, 2023*; 1:00 p.m., ESPN+		IUPUI	W 79–49	4–1	Credit Union 1 Arena (948); Chicago, IL
November 26, 2023*; 2:00 p.m., ESPN+		at Saint Louis	L 75–79	4–2	Chaifetz Arena (527); St. Louis, MO
December 1, 2023*; 7:00 p.m., SLN		at Omaha	W 95–89	5–2	Baxter Arena (852); Omaha, NE
December 13, 2023*; 7:00 p.m., ESPN+		at Green Bay	L 56–64	5–3	Kress Events Center (1,738); Green Bay, WI
December 15, 2023*; 7:00 p.m., ESPN+		Chicago State	W 76–46	6–3	Credit Union 1 Arena (942); Chicago, IL
December 20, 2023*; 10:00 a.m.		vs. UTEP; West Palm Beach Classic	W 81–65	7–3	Rubin Arena (62); West Palm Beach, FL
December 21, 2023*; 10:00 a.m., FloHoops		vs. Arkansas; West Palm Beach Classic	L 58–66	7–4	Massimino Court (–); West Palm Beach, FL
MVC regular season
December 30, 2023; 4:00 p.m., ESPN+		at Belmont	L 61–69	7–5 (0–1)	Curb Event Center (1,042); Nashville, TN
January 4, 2024; 6:00 p.m., ESPN+		at Southern Illinois	W 66–59	8–5 (1–1)	Banterra Center (206); Carbondale, IL
January 6, 2024; 1:00 p.m., ESPN+		at Missouri State	L 50–51	8–6 (1–2)	Great Southern Bank Arena (2,885); Springfield, MO
January 12, 2024; 7:00 p.m., ESPN+		Northern Iowa	Postponed		Credit Union 1 Arena; Chicago, IL
January 14, 2024; 1:00 p.m., ESPN+		Drake	L 62–82	8–7 (1–3)	Credit Union 1 Arena (1,121); Chicago, IL
January 19, 2024; 7:00 p.m., ESPN+		Bradley	W 75–68	9–7 (2–3)	Credit Union 1 Arena (1,189); Chicago, IL
January 21, 2024; 1:00 p.m., ESPN+		Illinois State	W 86–79 ^{OT}	10–7 (3–3)	Credit Union 1 Arena (1,731); Chicago, IL
January 26, 2024; 6:00 p.m., ESPN+		at Evansville	W 70–61	11–7 (4–3)	Meeks Family Fieldhouse (245); Evansville, IN
January 28, 2024; 12:00 p.m., ESPN+		at Indiana State	W 76–48	12–7 (5–3)	Hulman Center (1,336); Terre Haute, IN
January 31, 2024; 6:00 p.m., ESPN+		Northern Iowa; Rescheduled from January 12	L 43–65	12–8 (5–4)	Credit Union 1 Arena (927); Chicago, IL
February 4, 2024; 1:00 p.m., ESPN+		Valparaiso	L 70–71	12–9 (5–5)	Credit Union 1 Arena (1,843); Chicago, IL
February 9, 2024; 7:00 p.m., ESPN+		Evansville	W 65–57	13–9 (6–5)	Credit Union 1 Arena (1,456); Chicago, IL
February 11, 2024; 12:00 p.m., ESPN+		Indiana State	W 68–53	14–9 (7–5)	Credit Union 1 Arena (1,040); Chicago, IL
February 15, 2024; 6:30 p.m., ESPN+		at Illinois State	L 61–64	14–10 (7–6)	CEFCU Arena (1,379); Normal, IL
February 17, 2024; 2:00 p.m., ESPN+		at Bradley	W 68–47	15–10 (8–6)	Renaissance Coliseum (472); Peoria, IL
February 22, 2024; 7:00 p.m., ESPN+		Murray State	L 63–83	15–11 (8–7)	Credit Union 1 Arena (1,607); Chicago, IL
February 25, 2024; 1:00 p.m., ESPN+		at Valparaiso	W 82–59	16–11 (9–7)	Athletics–Recreation Center (512); Valparaiso, IN
February 29, 2024; 7:00 p.m., ESPN+		at Drake	L 63–84	16–12 (9–8)	Knapp Center (2,288); Des Moines, IA
March 2, 2024; 2:00 p.m., ESPN+		at Northern Iowa	L 52–61	16–13 (9–9)	McLeod Center (4,008); Cedar Falls, IA
March 7, 2024; 7:00 p.m., ESPN+		Missouri State	W 65–61	17–13 (10–9)	Credit Union 1 Arena (1,107); Chicago, IL
March 9, 2024; 1:00 p.m., ESPN+		Southern Illinois	L 65–69 ^{OT}	17–14 (10–10)	Credit Union 1 Arena (1,477); Chicago, IL
MVC tournament
March 14, 2024; 6:00 p.m., ESPN+	(7)	vs. (10) Valparaiso; First round	W 79–77	18–14	Vibrant Arena at The MARK; Moline, IL
March 15, 2024; 6:00 p.m., ESPN+	(7)	vs. (2) Belmont; Quarterfinals	L 65–70	18–15	Vibrant Arena at The MARK; Moline, IL
WNIT
March 21, 2024*; 7:00 p.m., ESPN+		at Southern Indiana; First round	L 64–69	18–16	Screaming Eagles Arena (1,731); Evansville, IN
*Non-conference game. ^{#}Rankings from AP poll. (#) Tournament seedings in parentheses. All times are in Central.
