= 2023–24 Evansville Purple Aces women's basketball team =

American college basketball season

2023–24 Evansville Purple Aces women's basketball
- Conference: Missouri Valley Conference
- Record: 4–27 (2–18 MVC)
- Head coach: Robyn Scherr-Wells (3rd season)
- Associate head coach: Dodie Dunson
- Assistant coaches: Tori Jarosz; Caleb Poston; Van Klohmann
- Home arena: Meeks Family Fieldhouse

2023–24 Missouri Valley Conference women's basketball standings
	Conf.				Overall
Team	W		L	PCT	W		L	PCT
Drake †	19	–	1	.950	29	–	6	.829
Belmont	17	–	3	.850	26	–	9	.743
Missouri State	15	–	5	.750	23	–	10	.697
Northern Iowa	14	–	6	.700	16	–	16	.500
Illinois State	13	–	7	.650	22	–	12	.647
Murray State	12	–	8	.600	20	–	12	.625
UIC	10	–	10	.500	18	–	16	.529
Southern Illinois	6	–	14	.300	11	–	20	.355
Indiana State	6	–	14	.300	11	–	21	.344
Valparaiso	4	–	16	.200	5	–	25	.167
Bradley	2	–	18	.100	6	–	26	.188
Evansville	2	–	18	.100	4	–	28	.125
† 2024 MVC tournament winner

The 2023–24 Evansville Purple Aces women's basketball team represented the University of Evansville during the 2023–24 NCAA Division I women's basketball season. The Purple Aces, led by third-year head coach Robyn Scherr-Wells, played their home games at Meeks Family Fieldhouse in Evansville, Indiana as members of the Missouri Valley Conference (MVC).

== Previous season ==
The Purple Aces finished the 2022–23 season 11–19, 6–14 in MVC play, to finish in a tie for ninth place. They were defeated by Murray State in the opening round of the MVC tournament.

== Roster ==
2023–24 Evansville Purple Aces women's basketball team
Players
Coaches

Pos.	#	Name	Height	Year	Previous school	Hometown
G	0	Kynidi Mason Striverson	5 ft 8 in (1.73 m)	So	Silver Creek High School	Sellersburg, IN
G	2	Alana Striverson	5 ft 10 in (1.78 m)	Jr	Lindenwood	Sellersburg, IN
C	3	Barbora Tomancova	6 ft 3 in (1.91 m)	GS	FIU	Brno, Czech Republic
F	4	Tamesha "Mae" Dozier	6 ft 1 in (1.85 m)	So	Wabash Valley College	Louisville, KY
G	5	Julia Palomo	5 ft 7 in (1.7 m)	Jr	Casper College	La Seu d'Urgell, Spain
G	11	Sydney Bradley	5 ft 10 in (1.78 m)	Fr	Westminster Christian Academy	St. Louis, MO
G	13	Madlena Gerke	5 ft 10 in (1.78 m)	Jr	Eastern Florida State	Riga, Latvia
F	21	Anica Skrivan	6 ft 1 in (1.85 m)	Jr	Northeastern Oklahoma A&M	Trebinje, Bosnia and Herzegovina
F	22	Nevaeh Thomas	5 ft 11 in (1.8 m)	Fr	Bradford High School	Kenosha, WI
F	24	Maggie Hartwig	6 ft 1 in (1.85 m)	Fr	Sauk Prairie High School	Sauk City, WI
G	25	Lexie Sinclair	5 ft 8 in (1.73 m)	Jr	St. Bonaventure	Carol Stream, IL
G	30	Tené Smith	5 ft 6 in (1.68 m)	Fr	King's Christian Collegiate	Brampton, ON

Head coach

- Robyn Scherr-Wells (Michigan)

Assistant coach(es)

- Dodie Dunson (Bradley)
- Tori Jarosz (Marist)
- Caleb Poston (Cincinnati)
- Van Klohmann (Missouri)

Legend

- (C) Team captain
- (S) Suspended
- (I) Ineligible
- (W) Walk-on
- Injured
- Current redshirt

Roster
Last update: March 7, 2024

== Schedule and results ==
Date time, TV	Rank^{#}	Opponent^{#}	Result	Record	Site (attendance) city, state
Exhibition
November 2, 2023*; 6:00 p.m.		Oakland City	W 81–77	–	Meeks Family Fieldhouse (425); Evansville, IN
Non-conference regular season
November 7, 2023*; 6:00 p.m., ESPN+		Lipscomb	L 58–77	0–1	Meeks Family Fieldhouse (592); Evansville, IN
November 12, 2023*; 1:00 p.m., ESPN+		at SIU Edwardsville; Tri-State Challenge	L 83–91	0–2	First Community Arena (448); Edwardsville, IL
November 15, 2023*; 6:00 p.m., ESPN+		Eastern Kentucky; Tri-State Challenge	L 75–77	0–3	Meeks Family Fieldhouse (323); Evansville, IN
November 19, 2023*; 12:00 p.m., B1G+		at Michigan State	L 49–105	0–4	Breslin Center (3,107); East Lansing, MI
November 26, 2023*; 1:00 p.m.		at Chicago State	W 103–102 ^{3OT}	1–4	Jones Convocation Center (79); Chicago, IL
November 29, 2023*; 6:00 p.m., ESPN+		Bellarmine	L 58–64	1–5	Meeks Family Fieldhouse (410); Evansville, IN
December 2, 2023*; 1:00 p.m., ESPN+		at UT Martin	L 82–94	1–6	Skyhawk Arena (1,012); Martin, TN
December 6, 2023*; 6:00 p.m., ESPN+		IUPUI	L 75–81	1–7	Meeks Family Fieldhouse (375); Evansville, IN
December 16, 2023*; 2:00 p.m., ESPN+		Lindenwood	W 70–68	2–7	Meeks Family Fieldhouse (369); Evansville, IN
December 18, 2023*; 6:00 p.m., B1G+		at No. 16 Indiana	L 56–109	2–8	Simon Skjodt Assembly Hall (8,227); Bloomington, IN
December 21, 2023*; 11:00 a.m., ESPN+		at Southeast Missouri State	L 44–74	2–9	Show Me Center (400); Cape Girardeau, MO
MVC regular season
December 30, 2023; 6:00 p.m., ESPN+		Indiana State	L 49–66	2–10 (0–1)	Meeks Family Fieldhouse (409); Evansville, IN
January 4, 2024; 6:00 p.m., ESPN+		at Northern Iowa	L 52–82	2–11 (0–2)	McLeod Center (3,781); Cedar Falls, IA
January 6, 2024; 2:00 p.m., ESPN+		at Drake	L 68–78	2–12 (0–3)	Knapp Center (2,193); Des Moines, IA
January 12, 2024; 11:00 a.m., ESPN+		Belmont	L 40–84	2–13 (0–4)	Meeks Family Fieldhouse (1,508); Evansville, IN
January 14, 2024; 1:00 p.m., ESPN+		Murray State	L 72–90	2–14 (0–5)	Meeks Family Fieldhouse (489); Evansville, IN
January 19, 2024; 6:30 p.m., ESPN+		at Missouri State	L 55–90	2–15 (0–6)	Great Southern Bank Arena (1,921); Springfield, MO
January 21, 2024; 2:00 p.m., ESPN+		at Southern Illinois	L 60–99	2–16 (0–7)	Banterra Center (564); Carbondale, IL
January 26, 2024; 6:00 p.m., ESPN+		UIC	L 61–70	2–17 (0–8)	Meeks Family Fieldhouse (245); Evansville, IN
January 28, 2024; 2:00 p.m., ESPN+		Valparaiso	L 59–70	2–18 (0–9)	Meeks Family Fieldhouse (375); Evansville, IN
February 3, 2024; 5:00 p.m., ESPN+		Bradley	L 72–79	2–19 (0–10)	Meeks Family Fieldhouse (675); Evansville, IN
February 9, 2024; 7:00 p.m., ESPN+		at UIC	L 57–65	2–20 (0–11)	Credit Union 1 Arena (1,456); Chicago, IL
February 11, 2024; 1:00 p.m., ESPN+		at Valparaiso	W 71–68	3–20 (1–11)	Athletics–Recreation Center (278); Valparaiso, IN
February 15, 2024; 6:00 p.m., ESPN+		Southern Illinois	W 93–89 ^{OT}	4–20 (2–11)	Meeks Family Fieldhouse (215); Evansville, IN
February 17, 2024; 2:00 p.m., ESPN+		Missouri State	L 56–73	4–21 (2–12)	Meeks Family Fieldhouse (440); Evansville, IN
February 22, 2024; 5:00 p.m., ESPN+		at Indiana State	L 66–69	4–22 (2–13)	Hulman Center (1,245); Terre Haute, IN
February 25, 2024; 2:00 p.m., ESPN+		at Illinois State	L 50–78	4–23 (2–14)	CEFCU Arena (–); Normal, IL
March 1, 2024; 6:00 p.m., ESPN+		at Murray State	L 59–85	4–24 (2–15)	CFSB Center (1,431); Murray, KY
March 3, 2024; 1:00 p.m., ESPN+		at Belmont	L 55–80	4–25 (2–16)	Curb Event Center (1,175); Nashville, TN
March 7, 2024; 6:00 p.m., ESPN+		Drake	L 53–86	4–26 (2–17)	Meeks Family Fieldhouse (167); Evansville, IN
March 9, 2024; 2:00 p.m., ESPN+		Northern Iowa	L 46–67	4–27 (2–18)	Meeks Family Fieldhouse (153); Evansville, IN
MVC tournament
March 14, 2024; 2:30 p.m., ESPN+	(12)	vs. (5) Illinois State; Opening round	L 64–85	4–28	Vibrant Arena at The MARK (776); Moline, IL
*Non-conference game. ^{#}Rankings from AP poll. (#) Tournament seedings in parentheses. All times are in Central.
