= 2023–24 Bradley Braves women's basketball team =

American college basketball season

2023–24 Bradley Braves women's basketball
- Conference: Missouri Valley Conference
- Record: 6–25 (2–18 MVC)
- Head coach: Kate Popovec-Goss (2nd season)
- Assistant coaches: Symone Denham; Ollie Goss; Armelia Horton
- Home arena: Renaissance Coliseum

2023–24 Missouri Valley Conference women's basketball standings
	Conf.				Overall
Team	W		L	PCT	W		L	PCT
Drake †	19	–	1	.950	29	–	6	.829
Belmont	17	–	3	.850	26	–	9	.743
Missouri State	15	–	5	.750	23	–	10	.697
Northern Iowa	14	–	6	.700	16	–	16	.500
Illinois State	13	–	7	.650	22	–	12	.647
Murray State	12	–	8	.600	20	–	12	.625
UIC	10	–	10	.500	18	–	16	.529
Southern Illinois	6	–	14	.300	11	–	20	.355
Indiana State	6	–	14	.300	11	–	21	.344
Valparaiso	4	–	16	.200	5	–	25	.167
Bradley	2	–	18	.100	6	–	26	.188
Evansville	2	–	18	.100	4	–	28	.125
† 2024 MVC tournament winner

The 2023–24 Bradley Braves women's basketball team represented Bradley University during the 2023–24 NCAA Division I women's basketball season. The Braves, led by second-year head coach Kate Popovec-Goss, played their home games at the Renaissance Coliseum located in Peoria, Illinois, as members of the Missouri Valley Conference (MVC).

== Previous season ==
The Braves finished the 2022–23 season 4–28, 1–19 in MVC play, to finish in last (12th) place. They were defeated by Missouri State in the opening round of the MVC tournament.

== Roster ==
2023–24 Bradley Braves women's basketball team
Players
Coaches

Pos.	#	Name	Height	Year	Previous school	Hometown
G/F	0	Kaylen Nelson	5 ft 10 in (1.78 m)	Jr	Old Dominion	Tulsa, OK
G/F	1	Claire McDougall	6 ft 0 in (1.83 m)	Fr	Washington Community High School	Washington, IL
G	2	Lucia Llaveria	5 ft 7 in (1.7 m)	So	Sagrat Cor Diputacio	Sant Vicenç de Montalt, Spain
G	3	Alex Rouse	5 ft 8 in (1.73 m)	Jr	Old Dominion	Little Rock, AR
G	4	Ruba Abo Hashesh	5 ft 6 in (1.68 m)	Sr	Iowa Western Community College	Karlstad, Sweden
G	5	Halli Poock	5 ft 4 in (1.63 m)	Fr	Waterloo West High School	Waterloo, IA
G	10	Katy Wade	5 ft 6 in (1.68 m)	Jr	Plano West High School	Plano, TX
G	12	Nika Dorsey	5 ft 10 in (1.78 m)	Jr	Renaissance High School	Detroit, MI
F	13	Sheyene Neale	5 ft 10 in (1.78 m)	Fr	King's Christian Collegiate	Oakville, ON
F	15	Armoni "Moni" Strozier	6 ft 0 in (1.83 m)	Fr	Carman-Ainsworth High School	Flint, MI
G	23	Reagan Barkema	5 ft 11 in (1.8 m)	So	Roland–Story High School	Story City, IA
F	24	Isis Fitch	6 ft 0 in (1.83 m)	Sr	Homewood-Flossmoor High School	Homewood, IL
F	25	Daija Powell	6 ft 1 in (1.85 m)	Sr	Texas Tech	Tyrone, GA
F	42	Callie Ziebell	6 ft 2 in (1.88 m)	Jr	Sparta High School	Sparta, WI

Head coach

- Kate Popovec-Goss (Northwestern)

Assistant coach(es)

- Symone Denham (Wright State)
- Ollie Goss (Bowling Green)
- Armelia Horton (St. Bonaventure)

Legend

- (C) Team captain
- (S) Suspended
- (I) Ineligible
- (W) Walk-on
- Injured
- Current redshirt

Roster
Last update: March 8, 2024

== Schedule and results ==
Date time, TV	Rank^{#}	Opponent^{#}	Result	Record	Site (attendance) city, state
Exhibition
November 2, 2023*; 6:00 p.m.		Eureka	W 97–41	–	Renaissance Coliseum (–); Peoria, IL
Non-conference regular season
November 6, 2023*; 11:00 a.m., SLN		at Kansas City	L 66–73	0–1	Swinney Recreation Center (1,203); Kansas City, MO
November 12, 2023*; 2:00 p.m., ESPN+		Central Michigan	W 65–62	1–1	Renaissance Coliseum (447); Peoria, IL
November 16, 2023*; 6:00 p.m., ESPN+		Loyola Chicago	L 62–67 ^{OT}	1–2	Renaissance Coliseum (435); Peoria, IL
November 22, 2023*; 1:30 p.m.		vs. Elon; Georgia State Classic	W 66–59	2–2	GSU Convocation Center (839); Atlanta, GA
November 23, 2023*; 1:30 p.m.		vs. Bethune–Cookman; Georgia State Classic	L 57–64	2–3	GSU Convocation Center (771); Atlanta, GA
November 29, 2023*; 6:00 p.m., FloHoops		at Butler	L 46–67	2–4	Hinkle Fieldhouse (692); Indianapolis, IN
December 2, 2023*; 7:00 p.m., ESPN+		Lindenwood	W 63–56	3–4	Renaissance Coliseum (422); Peoria, IL
December 5, 2023*; 6:00 p.m., ESPN+		Eastern Illinois	L 67–79	3–5	Renaissance Coliseum (372); Peoria, IL
December 14, 2023*; 11:00 a.m., ESPN+		Quincy	W 79–73	4–5	Renaissance Coliseum (2,222); Peoria, IL
December 17, 2023*; 2:00 p.m., B1G+		at Northwestern	L 66–86	4–6	Welsh–Ryan Arena (1,797); Evanston, IL
December 20, 2023*; 6:00 p.m., SLN		at South Dakota	L 47–68	4–7	Sanford Coyote Sports Center (1,487); Vermillion, SD
MVC regular season
December 30, 2023; 4:00 p.m., ESPN+		at Illinois State; I-74 Rivalry	L 74–78	4–8 (0–1)	CEFCU Arena (2,241); Normal, IL
January 4, 2024; 6:00 p.m., ESPN+		at Murray State	L 52–99	4–9 (0–2)	CFSB Center (1,344); Murray, KY
January 6, 2024; 2:00 p.m., ESPN+		at Belmont	L 47–89	4–10 (0–3)	Curb Event Center (1,003); Nashville, TN
January 11, 2024; 6:00 p.m., ESPN+		Missouri State	L 66–94	4–11 (0–4)	Renaissance Coliseum (379); Peoria, IL
January 13, 2024; 2:00 p.m., ESPN+		Southern Illinois	W 58–56	5–11 (1–4)	Renaissance Coliseum (308); Peoria, IL
January 19, 2024; 7:00 p.m., ESPN+		at UIC	L 68–75	5–12 (1–5)	Credit Union 1 Arena (1,189); Chicago, IL
January 21, 2024; 1:00 p.m., ESPN+		at Valparaiso	L 55–79	5–13 (1–6)	Athletics–Recreation Center (548); Valparaiso, IN
January 25, 2024; 6:00 p.m., ESPN+		Drake	L 65–77	5–14 (1–7)	Renaissance Coliseum (393); Peoria, IL
January 27, 2024; 2:00 p.m., ESPN+		Northern Iowa	L 59–105	5–15 (1–8)	Renaissance Coliseum (451); Peoria, IL
February 3, 2024; 5:00 p.m., ESPN+		at Evansville	W 79–72	6–15 (2–8)	Meeks Family Fieldhouse (675); Evansville, IN
February 8, 2024; 6:00 p.m., ESPN+		at Drake	L 60–71	6–16 (2–9)	Knapp Center (2,262); Des Moines, IA
February 10, 2024; 2:00 p.m., ESPN+		at Northern Iowa	L 61–96	6–17 (2–10)	McLeod Center (4,012); Cedar Falls, IA
February 15, 2024; 6:00 p.m., ESPN+		Valparaiso	L 50–68	6–18 (2–11)	Renaissance Coliseum (311); Peoria, IL
February 17, 2024; 2:00 p.m., ESPN+		UIC	L 47–68	6–19 (2–12)	Renaissance Coliseum (472); Peoria, IL
February 22, 2024; 6:00 p.m., ESPN+		Illinois State; I-74 Rivalry	L 50–68	6–20 (2–13)	Renaissance Coliseum (510); Peoria, IL
February 25, 2024; 2:00 p.m., ESPN+		Indiana State	L 67–74	6–21 (2–14)	Renaissance Coliseum (343); Peoria, IL
February 29, 2024; 6:30 p.m., ESPN+		at Missouri State	L 44–70	6–22 (2–15)	Great Southern Bank Arena (1,818); Springfield, MO
March 2, 2024; 2:00 p.m., ESPN+		Southern Illinois	L 54–70	6–23 (2–16)	Renaissance Coliseum (–); Peoria, IL
March 7, 2024; 6:00 p.m., ESPN+		Belmont	L 72–77	6–24 (2–17)	Renaissance Coliseum (332); Peoria, IL
March 9, 2024; 12:00 p.m., ESPN+		Murray State	L 64–81	6–25 (2–18)	Renaissance Coliseum (307); Peoria, IL
MVC tournament
March 14, 2024; 8:30 p.m., ESPN+	(11)	vs. (6) Murray State; Opening round	L 49-87	6-26	Vibrant Arena at The MARK (759); Moline, IL
*Non-conference game. ^{#}Rankings from AP poll. (#) Tournament seedings in parentheses. All times are in Central.
