= Ashleen Bracey =

American basketball coach

Current position
- Title: Head coach
- Team: UIC
- Conference: MVC
- Record: 66–69 (.489)

Biographical details
- Born: March 29, 1988 (age 38); Oak Park, Illinois, U.S.

Playing career
- 2006–2010: Illinois State

Coaching career (HC unless noted)
- 2011–2012: Missouri (GA)
- 2012–2013: Ball State (assistant)
- 2013–2016: UAB (assistant)
- 2016–2022: Missouri (assistant)
- 2022–present: UIC

Head coaching record
- Overall: 66–69 (.489)
- Tournaments: 0–1 (WNIT); 1–2 (WBI)

Ashleen Margaret Bracey (born March 29, 1988) is an American basketball coach and former player who is currently the head women's basketball coach at the University of Illinois Chicago. She was named the Flames' head coach in 2022 after stints as an assistant coach at Missouri, UAB, and Ball State.

== Illinois State statistics ==
Legend
GP	Games played	GS	Games started	MPG	Minutes per game
FG%	Field goal percentage	3P%	3-point field goal percentage	FT%	Free throw percentage
RPG	Rebounds per game	APG	Assists per game	SPG	Steals per game
BPG	Blocks per game	PPG	Points per game	**Bold**	Career high

Year	Team	GP	Points	FG%	3P%	FT%	RPG	APG	SPG	BPG	PPG
2006-07	Illinois State	16	18	31.8%	-	36.4%	1.4	0.2	0.3	0.1	1.1
2007-08	Illinois State	33	329	**55.9%**	-	68.5%	**7.6**	1.4	0.8	0.5	10.0
2008-09	Illinois State	33	319	49.8%	32.4%	75.0%	6.4	**1.8**	0.9	0.4	9.4
2009-10	Illinois State	**36**	**528**	48.2%	**41.5%**	**88.9%**	7.6	1.4	**1.3**	**0.7**	**14.7**
Career		119	1194	50.4%	39.4%	77.3%	6.4	1.4	0.9	0.5	10.0

== Head coaching record ==
Statistics overview
Season	Team	Overall	Conference	Standing	Postseason
**UIC Flames** (Missouri Valley Conference) (2022–present)
2022–23	UIC	19–17	9–11	6th	WBI 7th Place
2023–24	UIC	18–16	10–10	7th	WNIT First Round
2024–25	UIC	15–18	10–10	7th	
2025–26	UIC	14–18	9–11	7th	
UIC:		66–69 (.489)	38–42 (.475)		
Total:		66–69 (.489)			
National champion Postseason invitational champion Conference regular season champion Conference regular season and conference tournament champion Division regular season champion Division regular season and conference tournament champion Conference tournament champion
