= 2023–24 Murray State Racers women's basketball team =

American college basketball season

2023–24 Murray State Racers women's basketball

WNIT, second round
- Conference: Missouri Valley Conference
- Record: 20–12 (12–8 MVC)
- Head coach: Rechelle Turner (7th season)
- Assistant coaches: Monica Evans; Wyatt Foust; Brittney Patrick
- Home arena: CFSB Center

2023–24 Missouri Valley Conference women's basketball standings
	Conf.				Overall
Team	W		L	PCT	W		L	PCT
Drake †	19	–	1	.950	29	–	6	.829
Belmont	17	–	3	.850	26	–	9	.743
Missouri State	15	–	5	.750	23	–	10	.697
Northern Iowa	14	–	6	.700	16	–	16	.500
Illinois State	13	–	7	.650	22	–	12	.647
Murray State	12	–	8	.600	20	–	12	.625
UIC	10	–	10	.500	18	–	16	.529
Southern Illinois	6	–	14	.300	11	–	20	.355
Indiana State	6	–	14	.300	11	–	21	.344
Valparaiso	4	–	16	.200	5	–	25	.167
Bradley	2	–	18	.100	6	–	26	.188
Evansville	2	–	18	.100	4	–	28	.125
† 2024 MVC tournament winner

The 2023–24 Murray State Racers women's basketball team represented Murray State University during the 2023–24 NCAA Division I women's basketball season. The Racers, led by seventh-year head coach Rechelle Turner, played their home games at the CFSB Center in Murray, Kentucky as second-year members of the Missouri Valley Conference (MVC). They finished the season 20–12, 12–8 in MVC play, to finish in sixth place.

== Previous season ==
The Racers finished the 2022–23 season 15–16, 7–13 in MVC play, to finish in eighth place. They defeated Evansville in the opening round of the 2023 MVC women's basketball tournament, before falling to top-seeded Illinois State in the quarterfinals.

== Roster ==
2023–24 Murray State Racers women's basketball team
Players
Coaches

Pos.	#	Name	Height	Year	Previous school	Hometown
G	2	Haven Ford	5 ft 6 in (1.68 m)	Fr	Rowan County High School	Morehead, KY
G	3	Briley Pena	5 ft 4 in (1.63 m)	So	Nettleton High School	Jonesboro, AR
G	5	Trinity White	5 ft 9 in (1.75 m)	Jr	Butler	McKinney, TX
C	10	Lucia Operto	6 ft 3 in (1.91 m)	Sr	Club Atlético Lanús	Lehmann, Argentina
G	11	Cayson Conner	5 ft 7 in (1.7 m)	Jr	Marshall County High School	Benton, KY
G	12	Jenna Walker	5 ft 8 in (1.73 m)	Jr	Western Kentucky	Priceville, AL
F	13	Jaidah Black	6 ft 0 in (1.83 m)	Jr	Boswell High School	Fort Worth, TX
G/F	14	Ava Learn	6 ft 1 in (1.85 m)	Jr	Purdue	Pleasant Valley, NY
G	21	Bria Sanders-Woods	5 ft 8 in (1.73 m)	Sr	Putnam City North High School	Oklahoma City, OK
F	22	Hannah McKay	6 ft 0 in (1.83 m)	Sr	Owensboro Catholic High School	Owensboro, KY
G	23	Zoe Stewart	5 ft 10 in (1.78 m)	RS Fr	Terre Haute North High School	Terre Haute, IN
G/F	25	Destiny Thomas	5 ft 10 in (1.78 m)	Fr	McCracken County High School	Paducah, KY
F	31	Katelyn Young	6 ft 1 in (1.85 m)	Sr	Oakwood High School	Oakwood, IL
G/F	32	Charlee Settle	6 ft 1 in (1.85 m)	Sr	Calloway County High School	Murray, KY
F	42	Halle Langhi	6 ft 2 in (1.88 m)	So	Marshall County High School	Benton, KY

Head coach

- Rechelle Turner (Murray State)

Assistant coach(es)

- Monica Evans (Murray State)
- Wyatt Foust (Kentucky Wesleyan)
- Brittney Patrick (Southern Illinois)

Legend

- (C) Team captain
- (S) Suspended
- (I) Ineligible
- (W) Walk-on
- Injured
- Current redshirt

Roster
Last update: March 4, 2024

== Schedule and results ==
Date time, TV	Rank^{#}	Opponent^{#}	Result	Record	Site (attendance) city, state
Exhibition
November 2, 2023*; 6:00 p.m., ESPN+		Lindsey Wilson	W 102–45	–	CFSB Center (667); Murray, KY
Non-conference regular season
November 10, 2023*; 10:30 a.m., SECN+		at Arkansas	L 79–82	0–1	Bud Walton Arena (11,026); Fayetteville, AR
November 14, 2023*; 11:00 a.m., ESPN+		Cumberland	W 121–63	1–1	CFSB Center (2,317); Murray, KY
November 17, 2023*; 6:00 p.m., B1G+		at No. 18 Indiana	L 79–112	1–2	Simon Skjodt Assembly Hall (8,432); Bloomington, IN
November 21, 2023*; 6:00 p.m., ESPN+		Bellarmine	W 108–78	2–2	CFSB Center (869); Murray, KY
November 28, 2023*; 6:00 p.m., ESPN+		UT Martin	W 88–75	3–2	CFSB Center (1,372); Murray, KY
December 1, 2023*; 7:00 p.m., ESPN+		at Southern Indiana	W 93–73	4–2	Screaming Eagles Arena (907); Evansville, IN
December 9, 2023*; 4:00 p.m., ESPN+		at Austin Peay	W 93–85	5–2	F&M Bank Arena (5,458); Clarksville, TN
December 14, 2023*; 6:00 p.m., ESPN+		Little Rock	W 98–79	6–2	CFSB Center (937); Murray, KY
December 18, 2023*; 1:00 p.m., ESPN+		at Western Carolina	W 89–79	7–2	Ramsey Center (285); Cullowhee, NC
MVC regular season
December 30, 2023; 5:00 p.m., ESPN+		Valparaiso	W 90–62	8–2 (1–0)	CFSB Center (2,652); Murray, KY
January 4, 2024; 6:00 p.m., ESPN+		Bradley	W 99–52	9–2 (2–0)	CFSB Center (1,344); Murray, KY
January 6, 2024; 2:00 p.m., ESPN+		Illinois State	W 90–55	10–2 (3–0)	CFSB Center (1,631); Murray, KY
January 11, 2024; 5:00 p.m., ESPN+		at Indiana State	W 75–63	11–2 (4–0)	Hulman Center (1,338); Terre Haute, IN
January 14, 2024; 1:00 p.m., ESPN+		at Evansville	W 90–72	12–2 (5–0)	Meeks Family Fieldhouse (489); Evansville, IN
January 19, 2024; 6:00 p.m., ESPN+		at Northern Iowa	L 75–95	12–3 (5–1)	McLeod Center (3,293); Cedar Falls, IA
January 21, 2024; 2:00 p.m., ESPN+		at Drake	L 98–107	12–4 (5–2)	Knapp Center (2,184); Des Moines, IA
January 26, 2024; 6:00 p.m., ESPN+		Southern Illinois	W 75–70	13–4 (6–2)	CFSB Center (1,931); Murray, KY
January 28, 2024; 2:00 p.m., ESPN+		Missouri State	L 74–84	13–5 (6–3)	CFSB Center (2,163); Murray, KY
February 2, 2024; 6:00 p.m., BSSO/ESPN+		at Belmont	L 54–73	13–6 (6–4)	Curb Event Center (919); Nashville, TN
February 9, 2024; 6:00 p.m., ESPN+		at Southern Illinois	W 81–74	14–6 (7–4)	Banterra Center (474); Carbondale, IL
February 11, 2024; 2:00 p.m., ESPN+		at Missouri State	W 95–89	15–6 (8–4)	Great Southern Bank Arena (2,175); Springfield, MO
February 15, 2024; 6:00 p.m., ESPN+		Drake	L 75–81	15–7 (8–5)	CFSB Center (1,762); Murray, KY
February 17, 2024; 2:00 p.m., ESPN+		Northern Iowa	L 87–89	15–8 (8–6)	CFSB Center (1,562); Murray, KY
February 22, 2024; 7:00 p.m., ESPN+		at UIC	W 83–63	16–8 (9–6)	Credit Union 1 Arena (1,607); Chicago, IL
February 25, 2024; 2:00 p.m., ESPN+		Belmont	L 63–76	16–9 (9–7)	CFSB Center (1,647); Murray, KY
March 1, 2024; 6:00 p.m., ESPN+		Evansville	W 85–59	17–9 (10–7)	CFSB Center (1,431); Murray, KY
March 3, 2024; 2:00 p.m., ESPN+		Indiana State	W 87–70	18–9 (11–7)	CFSB Center (1,421); Murray, KY
March 7, 2024; 6:30 p.m., ESPN+		at Illinois State	L 75–85	18–10 (11–8)	CEFCU Arena (1,472); Normal, IL
March 9, 2024; 12:00 p.m., ESPN+		at Bradley	W 81–64	19–10 (12–8)	Renaissance Coliseum (307); Peoria, IL
MVC tournament
March 14, 2024; 8:30 p.m., ESPN+	(6)	vs. (11) Bradley; First round	W 87–49	20–10	Vibrant Arena at The MARK (759); Moline, IL
March 15, 2024; 8:30 p.m., ESPN+	(6)	vs. (3) Missouri State; Quarterfinals	L 70–71	20–11	Vibrant Arena at The MARK (1,004); Moline, IL
WNIT
March 23, 2024*; 5:00 p.m., ESPN+		at Southern Miss; Second round	L 67–78 ^{OT}	20–12	Reed Green Coliseum (1,566); Hattiesburg, MS
*Non-conference game. ^{#}Rankings from AP poll. (#) Tournament seedings in parentheses. All times are in Central.
