= 2023–24 Belmont Bruins women's basketball team =

American college basketball season

2023–24 Belmont Bruins women's basketball

WBIT, second round
- Conference: Missouri Valley Conference
- Record: 26–8 (17–3 MVC)
- Head coach: Bart Brooks (7th season)
- Associate head coach: Jamey Givens
- Assistant coaches: Amy Malo; Jessica Holman
- Home arena: Curb Event Center

2023–24 Missouri Valley Conference women's basketball standings
	Conf.				Overall
Team	W		L	PCT	W		L	PCT
Drake †	19	–	1	.950	29	–	6	.829
Belmont	17	–	3	.850	26	–	9	.743
Missouri State	15	–	5	.750	23	–	10	.697
Northern Iowa	14	–	6	.700	16	–	16	.500
Illinois State	13	–	7	.650	22	–	12	.647
Murray State	12	–	8	.600	20	–	12	.625
UIC	10	–	10	.500	18	–	16	.529
Southern Illinois	6	–	14	.300	11	–	20	.355
Indiana State	6	–	14	.300	11	–	21	.344
Valparaiso	4	–	16	.200	5	–	25	.167
Bradley	2	–	18	.100	6	–	26	.188
Evansville	2	–	18	.100	4	–	28	.125
† 2024 MVC tournament winner

The 2023–24 Belmont Bruins women's basketball team represented Belmont University during the 2023–24 NCAA Division I women's basketball season. The Bruins, led by seventh-year head coach Bart Brooks, played their home games at the Curb Event Center in Nashville, Tennessee as members of the Missouri Valley Conference (MVC).

The Bruins finished the season 26–8, 17–3 in MVC play, to finish in second place. They defeated UIC before falling to Missouri State in the semifinals of the MVC tournament. They received an at-large bid to the WBIT, where they defeated Ball State in the first round before falling to Penn State in the second round.

== Previous season ==
The Bruins finished the 2022–23 season 23–12, 17–3 in MVC play, to finish in a tie for first place. In the MVC tournament, they defeated Southern Illinois in the quarterfinals and Northern Iowa in the semifinals, before falling to Drake in the championship game. They received an at-large bid into the WNIT, where they lost to Ball State in the first round.

== Roster ==
2023–24 Belmont Bruins women's basketball team
Players
Coaches

Pos.	#	Name	Height	Year	Previous school	Hometown
G	0	Tuti Jones	5 ft 7 in (1.7 m)	RS Jr	Charles Henderson High School	Troy, AL
G	1	Kensley Feltner	5 ft 11 in (1.8 m)	Fr	Lawrence County High School	Louisa, KY
G	4	Liz Suder	5 ft 8 in (1.73 m)	Jr	Riverside High School	Leesburg, VA
G	10	Blair Schoenwald	5 ft 8 in (1.73 m)	Sr	Brentwood Academy	Brentwood, TN
G	12	Kilyn McGuff	6 ft 0 in (1.83 m)	Jr	Bishop Watterson High School	Columbus, OH
G	13	Claire Hyde	5 ft 6 in (1.68 m)	So	Morton College	Wheaton, IL
F	14	Kendal Cheesman	6 ft 2 in (1.88 m)	Jr	Vanderbilt	Tampa, FL
G	21	Emily La Chapell	5 ft 11 in (1.8 m)	So	Marquette	Appleton, WI
F	22	Tessa Miller	6 ft 2 in (1.88 m)	Jr	Stone Memorial High School	Crossville, TN
G	23	Jailyn Banks	5 ft 9 in (1.75 m)	Fr	Middle Tennessee Christian School	Spring Hill, TN
G	24	Kate Hollifield	5 ft 10 in (1.78 m)	So	Shelby High School	Shelby, NC
F	30	Caroline Bachus	6 ft 2 in (1.88 m)	RS Fr	Athens High School	Athens, AL
F	33	Carmyn Harrison	6 ft 2 in (1.88 m)	Jr	Georgia Tech	Memphis, TN

Head coach

- Bart Brooks (Wyoming)

Assistant coach(es)

- Jamey Givens (Florida State)
- Amy Malo (Vanderbilt)
- Jessica Holman (Vanderbilt)

Legend

- (C) Team captain
- (S) Suspended
- (I) Ineligible
- (W) Walk-on
- Injured
- Current redshirt

Roster
Last update: March 3, 2024

== Schedule and results ==
Date time, TV	Rank^{#}	Opponent^{#}	Result	Record	Site (attendance) city, state
Non-conference regular season
November 6, 2023*; 11:30 a.m., SECN+		at Missouri	L 61–72	0–1	Mizzou Arena (5,336); Columbia, MO
November 10, 2023*; 6:30 p.m., ESPN+		Georgia	W 76–50	1–1	Curb Event Center (1,203); Nashville, TN
November 15, 2023*; 6:30 p.m., ESPN+		Wichita State	W 75–67	2–1	Curb Event Center (775); Nashville, TN
November 19, 2023*; 2:00 p.m., ESPN+		Mississippi State	L 62–63	2–2	Curb Event Center (1,307); Nashville, TN
November 22, 2023*; 3:30 p.m., FloHoops		vs. No. 4 Stanford; Ball Dawgs Classic semifinals	L 55–74	2–3	Dollar Loan Center (1,634); Henderson, NV
November 24, 2023*; 11:00 p.m., FloHoops		vs. Northwestern; Ball Dawgs Classic 3rd-place game	W 83–61	3–3	Dollar Loan Center (1,584); Henderson, NV
November 29, 2023*; 6:00 p.m., ESPN+		at Troy	W 72–68	4–3	Trojan Arena (1,473); Troy, AL
December 3, 2023*; 2:00 p.m., ESPN+		Middle Tennessee	W 71–57	5–3	Curb Event Center (1,365); Nashville, TN
December 6, 2023*; 5:00 p.m., ESPN+		Lipscomb; Battle of the Boulevard	W 70–51	6–3	Curb Event Center (1,881); Nashville, TN
December 17, 2023*; 1:00 p.m., ESPN+		at Kennesaw State	W 65–54	7–3	KSU Convocation Center (459); Kennesaw, GA
December 22, 2023*; 12:00 p.m., B1G+		at No. 13 Ohio State	L 55–84	7–4	Value City Arena (6,336); Columbus, OH
MVC regular season
December 30, 2023; 4:00 p.m., ESPN+		UIC	W 69–61	8–4 (1–0)	Curb Event Center (1,042); Nashville, TN
January 4, 2024; 6:30 p.m., ESPN+		Illinois State	W 64–52	9–4 (2–0)	Curb Event Center (878); Nashville, TN
January 6, 2024; 2:00 p.m., ESPN+		Bradley	W 89–47	10–4 (3–0)	Curb Event Center (1,003); Nashville, TN
January 12, 2024; 11:00 a.m., ESPN+		at Evansville	W 84–40	11–4 (4–0)	Meeks Family Fieldhouse (1,508); Evansville, IN
January 14, 2024; 12:00 p.m., ESPN+		at Indiana State	W 61–56	12–4 (5–0)	Hulman Center (1,177); Terre Haute, IN
January 19, 2024; 6:00 p.m., BSSO/ESPN+		at Drake	L 65–69	12–5 (5–1)	Knapp Center (2,134); Des Moines, IA
January 21, 2024; 2:00 p.m., ESPN+		at Northern Iowa	W 72–67	13–5 (6–1)	McLeod Center (3,912); Cedar Falls, IA
January 26, 2024; 6:30 p.m., ESPN+		Missouri State	W 66–55	14–5 (7–1)	Curb Event Center (892); Nashville, TN
January 28, 2024; 2:00 p.m., ESPN+		Southern Illinois	W 72–64	15–5 (8–1)	Curb Event Center (892); Nashville, TN
February 2, 2024; 6:00 p.m., BSSO/ESPN+		Murray State	W 73–54	16–5 (9–1)	Curb Event Center (919); Nashville, TN
February 9, 2024; 6:30 p.m., ESPN+		at Missouri State	L 54–73	16–6 (9–2)	Great Southern Bank Arena (3,503); Springfield, MO
February 11, 2024; 1:00 p.m., ESPN+		at Southern Illinois	W 65–55	17–6 (10–2)	Banterra Center (325); Carbondale, IL
February 15, 2024; 6:30 p.m., ESPN+		Northern Iowa	W 84–72	18–6 (11–2)	Curb Event Center (812); Nashville, TN
February 17, 2024; 4:00 p.m., ESPN+		Drake	L 71–77	18–7 (11–3)	Curb Event Center (1,191); Nashville, TN
February 22, 2024; 6:00 p.m., ESPN+		at Valparaiso	W 83–56	19–7 (12–3)	Athletics–Recreation Center (270); Valparaiso, IN
February 25, 2024; 2:00 p.m., ESPN+		at Murray State	W 76–63	20–7 (13–3)	CFSB Center (1,647); Murray, KY
March 1, 2024; 6:30 p.m., ESPN+		Indiana State	W 87–62	21–7 (14–3)	Curb Event Center (789); Nashville, TN
March 3, 2024; 1:00 p.m., ESPN+		Evansville	W 80–55	22–7 (15–3)	Curb Event Center (1,175); Nashville, TN
March 7, 2024; 6:00 p.m., ESPN+		at Bradley	W 77–72	23–7 (16–3)	Renaissance Coliseum (332); Peoria, IL
March 9, 2024; 4:00 p.m., ESPN+		at Illinois State	W 72–69	24–7 (17–3)	CEFCU Arena (1,725); Normal, IL
MVC tournament
March 15, 2024; 6:00 p.m., ESPN+	(2)	vs. (7) UIC; Quarterfinals	W 70–65	25–7	Vibrant Arena at The MARK (1,004); Moline, IL
March 16, 2024; 4:00 p.m., ESPN+	(2)	vs. (3) Missouri State; Semifinals	L 48–63	25–8	Vibrant Arena at The MARK (1,747); Moline, IL
WBIT
March 21, 2024*; 3:00 p.m., ESPN+		at (4) Ball State; First round	W 77–59	26–8	Worthen Arena (719); Columbus, OH
March 25, 2024*; 5:00 p.m., ESPN+		at (1) Penn State; Second round	L 66–74	26–9	Bryce Jordan Center (1,666); University Park, PA
*Non-conference game. ^{#}Rankings from AP poll. (#) Tournament seedings in parentheses. All times are in Central.
