= 2023–24 Missouri State Lady Bears basketball team =

American college basketball season

2023–24 Missouri State Lady Bears basketball

WBIT, first round
- Conference: Missouri Valley Conference
- Record: 23–10 (15–5 MVC)
- Head coach: Beth Cunningham (2nd season)
- Associate head coach: Darren Guensch
- Assistant coaches: Kenzie Kostas; Olivia Applewhite
- Home arena: Great Southern Bank Arena

2023–24 Missouri Valley Conference women's basketball standings
| | Conf. | | | | Overall |
| Team | W | | L | PCT | W | | L | PCT |
|---|---|---|---|---|---|---|---|---|
| Drake † | 19 | – | 1 | .950 | 29 | – | 6 | .829 |
| Belmont | 17 | – | 3 | .850 | 26 | – | 9 | .743 |
| Missouri State | 15 | – | 5 | .750 | 23 | – | 10 | .697 |
| Northern Iowa | 14 | – | 6 | .700 | 16 | – | 16 | .500 |
| Illinois State | 13 | – | 7 | .650 | 22 | – | 12 | .647 |
| Murray State | 12 | – | 8 | .600 | 20 | – | 12 | .625 |
| UIC | 10 | – | 10 | .500 | 18 | – | 16 | .529 |
| Southern Illinois | 6 | – | 14 | .300 | 11 | – | 20 | .355 |
| Indiana State | 6 | – | 14 | .300 | 11 | – | 21 | .344 |
| Valparaiso | 4 | – | 16 | .200 | 5 | – | 25 | .167 |
| Bradley | 2 | – | 18 | .100 | 6 | – | 26 | .188 |
| Evansville | 2 | – | 18 | .100 | 4 | – | 28 | .125 |
† 2024 MVC tournament winner

The 2023–24 Missouri State Lady Bears basketball team represented Missouri State University during the 2023–24 NCAA Division I women's basketball season. The Lady Bears, led by second-year head coach Beth Cunningham, played their home games at the Great Southern Bank Arena in Springfield, Missouri as members of the Missouri Valley Conference (MVC). They finished the season 23–10, 15–5 in MVC play, to finish in third place.

== Previous season ==
The Lady Bears finished the 2022–23 season 20–12, 14–6 in MVC play, to finish in a tie for fourth place. They defeated Indiana State in the opening round of the MVC tournament, before falling to eventual tournament champions Drake in the quarterfinals. They received an at-large bid into the WNIT, where they would lose to Nebraska in the first round.

== Roster ==
2023–24 Missouri State Lady Bears women's basketball team
Players
Coaches

| Pos. | # | Name | Height | Year | Previous school | Hometown |
|---|---|---|---|---|---|---|
| G | 1 | Natasha Barnes | 5 ft 9 in (1.75 m) | Fr | Kenwood Academy | Chicago, IL |
| F | 3 | Kennedy Taylor | 6 ft 3 in (1.91 m) | Jr | Colorado | Shawnee Mission, KS |
| G | 4 | Lacy Stokes | 5 ft 4 in (1.63 m) | Jr | Missouri Southern | Mount Vernon, MO |
| G | 12 | Jaiden Bryant | 5 ft 9 in (1.75 m) | So | Incarnate Word Academy | St. Louis, MO |
| F | 13 | Katrine Jessen | 6 ft 4 in (1.93 m) | Sr | Kansas | Skovlunde, Denmark |
| F | 14 | Jade Masogayo | 6 ft 3 in (1.91 m) | So | Fossil Ridge High School | Fort Worth, TX |
| G | 20 | Angel Scott | 5 ft 10 in (1.78 m) | Jr | Stephen F. Austin | Edmond, OK |
| G | 21 | Kyrah Daniels | 6 ft 0 in (1.83 m) | Fr | ThunderRidge High School | Highlands Ranch, CO |
| G | 22 | Paige Rocca | 5 ft 9 in (1.75 m) | Sr | Iowa City High School | Iowa City, IA |
| F | 23 | Khloe Moad | 6 ft 2 in (1.88 m) | So | Ash Grove High School | Ash Grove, MO |
| G | 24 | Kaemyn Bekemeier | 5 ft 9 in (1.75 m) | Fr | Republic High School | Republic, MO |
| F | 32 | Louis Volker | 6 ft 1 in (1.85 m) | Fr | Paul VI Catholic High School | Purcellville, VA |
| F | 33 | Blake O'Grady | 6 ft 0 in (1.83 m) | Fr | Dexter Southfield School | Brookline, MA |
| F | 34 | Indya Green | 5 ft 11 in (1.8 m) | Jr | Moberly Area Community College | Springfield, MO |

Head coach

- Beth Cunningham (Notre Dame)

Assistant coach(es)

- Darren Guensch (Radford)
- Kenzie Kostas (Missouri State)
- Olivia Applewhite (Dayton)

Legend

- (C) Team captain
- (S) Suspended
- (I) Ineligible
- (W) Walk-on
- Injured
- Current redshirt

Roster
Last update: March 4, 2024

== Schedule and results ==
| Date time, TV | Rank^{#} | Opponent^{#} | Result | Record | Site (attendance) city, state |
Exhibition
| November 1, 2023*; 6:30 p.m. | | Missouri Western | L 57–65 | – | Great Southern Bank Arena (1,574); Springfield, MO |
Non-conference regular season
| November 6, 2023*; 5:00 p.m., ESPN+ | | at Little Rock | W 52–47 | 1–0 | Jack Stephens Center (–); Little Rock, AR |
| November 15, 2023*; 7:00 p.m., ESPN+ | | at Saint Louis | L 67–79 | 1–1 | Chaifetz Arena (923); St. Louis, MO |
| November 22, 2023*; 7:30 p.m. | | Southeast Missouri State | W 74–66 | 2–1 | Great Southern Bank Arena (1,783); Springfield, MO |
| November 26, 2023*; 2:00 p.m., ESPN+ | | at Oklahoma State | L 51–82 | 2–2 | Gallagher-Iba Arena (2,009); Stillwater, OK |
| December 1, 2023*; 6:30 p.m., ESPN+ | | Tulane | W 70–60 | 3–2 | Great Southern Bank Arena (1,922); Springfield, MO |
| December 6, 2023*; 6:00 p.m., SECN | | at Missouri | L 63–81 | 3–3 | Mizzou Arena (3,894); Columbia, MO |
| December 16, 2023*; 1:00 p.m., ESPN+ | | Wichita State | W 72–65 | 4–3 | Great Southern Bank Arena (3,001); Springfield, MO |
| December 20, 2023*; 2:30 p.m., ESPN+ | | BYU; Lady Bear Classic | W 56–55 | 5–3 | Great Southern Bank Arena (1,619); Springfield, MO |
| December 21, 2023*; 2:30 p.m., ESPN+ | | Western Kentucky; Lady Bear Classic | W 69–68 | 6–3 | Great Southern Bank Arena (1,674); Springfield, MO |
MVC regular season
| December 30, 2023; 1:00 p.m., ESPN+ | | Northern Iowa | W 54–52 | 7–3 (1–0) | Great Southern Bank Arena (2,111); Springfield, MO |
| January 4, 2024; 6:30 p.m., ESPN+ | | Valparaiso | W 67–47 | 8–3 (2–0) | Great Southern Bank Arena (1,656); Springfield, MO |
| January 6, 2024; 1:00 p.m., ESPN+ | | UIC | W 51–50 | 9–3 (3–0) | Great Southern Bank Arena (2,885); Springfield, MO |
| January 11, 2024; 6:00 p.m., ESPN+ | | at Bradley | W 94–66 | 10–3 (4–0) | Renaissance Coliseum (379); Peoria, IL |
| January 14, 2024; 6:00 p.m., ESPN+ | | at Illinois State | L 78–85 | 10–4 (4–1) | CEFCU Arena (1,056); Normal, IL |
| January 19, 2024; 6:30 p.m., ESPN+ | | Evansville | W 90–55 | 11–4 (5–1) | Great Southern Bank Arena (1,921); Springfield, MO |
| January 21, 2024; 2:00 p.m., ESPN+ | | Indiana State | W 89–71 | 12–4 (6–1) | Great Southern Bank Arena (2,353); Springfield, MO |
| January 26, 2024; 6:30 p.m., ESPN+ | | at Belmont | L 55–66 | 12–5 (6–2) | Curb Event Center (892); Nashville, TN |
| January 28, 2024; 2:00 p.m., ESPN+ | | at Murray State | W 84–74 | 13–5 (7–2) | CFSB Center (2,163); Murray, KY |
| February 3, 2024; 4:00 p.m., ESPN+ | | at Southern Illinois | W 62–52 | 14–5 (8–2) | Banterra Center (887); Carbondale, IL |
| February 9, 2024; 6:30 p.m., ESPN+ | | Belmont | W 73–54 | 15–5 (9–2) | Great Southern Bank Arena (3,503); Springfield, MO |
| February 11, 2024; 2:00 p.m., ESPN+ | | Murray State | L 89–95 | 15–6 (9–3) | Great Southern Bank Arena (2,175); Springfield, MO |
| February 15, 2024; 5:00 p.m., ESPN+ | | at Indiana State | W 59–51 | 16–6 (10–3) | Hulman Center (1,215); Terre Haute, IN |
| February 17, 2024; 2:00 p.m., ESPN+ | | at Evansville | W 73–56 | 17–6 (11–3) | Meeks Family Fieldhouse (440); Evansville, IN |
| February 22, 2024; 6:00 p.m., ESPN+ | | at Drake | L 65–76 | 17–7 (11–4) | Knapp Center (2,448); Des Moines, IA |
| February 25, 2024; 2:00 p.m., ESPN+ | | Southern Illinois | W 77–42 | 18–7 (12–4) | Great Southern Bank Arena (3,229); Springfield, MO |
| February 29, 2024; 6:30 p.m., ESPN+ | | Bradley | W 70–44 | 19–7 (13–4) | Great Southern Bank Arena (1,818); Springfield, MO |
| March 2, 2024; 2:00 p.m., ESPN+ | | Illinois State | W 67–62 | 20–7 (14–4) | Great Southern Bank Arena (3,030); Springfield, MO |
| March 7, 2024; 7:00 p.m., ESPN+ | | at UIC | L 61–65 | 20–8 (14–5) | Credit Union 1 Arena (1,107); Chicago, IL |
| March 9, 2024; 1:00 p.m., ESPN+ | | at Valparaiso | W 77–66 | 21–8 (15–5) | Athletics–Recreation Center (466); Valparaiso, IN |
MVC tournament
| March 15, 2024; 8:30 p.m., ESPN+ | (3) | vs. (6) Murray State; Quarterfinals | W 71–70 | 22–8 | Vibrant Arena at The MARK (1,004); Moline, IL |
| March 17, 2024; 4:00 p.m., ESPN+ | (3) | vs. (2) Belmont; Semifinals | W 63–48 | 23–8 | Vibrant Arena at The MARK (1,747); Moline, IL |
| March 16, 2024; 1:00 p.m., ESPN2 | (3) | vs. (1) Drake; Championship | L 75–76 | 23–9 | Vibrant Arena at The MARK (1,305); Moline, IL |
WBIT
| March 21, 2024*; 6:00 p.m., ESPN+ | | at (4) Illinois; First round | L 69–74 | 23–10 | State Farm Center (1,391); Champaign, IL |
*Non-conference game. ^{#}Rankings from AP poll. (#) Tournament seedings in parentheses. All times are in Central.
