= 2023–24 Northern Iowa Panthers women's basketball team =

American college basketball season

2023–24 Northern Iowa Panthers women's basketball

WNIT, Second Round
- Conference: Missouri Valley Conference
- Record: 16–16 (14–6 MVC)
- Head coach: Tanya Warren (17th season)
- Associate head coach: Brad Nelson
- Assistant coaches: Nate Oakland; Katelin Oney
- Home arena: McLeod Center

2023–24 Missouri Valley Conference women's basketball standings
	Conf.				Overall
Team	W		L	PCT	W		L	PCT
Drake †	19	–	1	.950	29	–	6	.829
Belmont	17	–	3	.850	26	–	9	.743
Missouri State	15	–	5	.750	23	–	10	.697
Northern Iowa	14	–	6	.700	16	–	16	.500
Illinois State	13	–	7	.650	22	–	12	.647
Murray State	12	–	8	.600	20	–	12	.625
UIC	10	–	10	.500	18	–	16	.529
Southern Illinois	6	–	14	.300	11	–	20	.355
Indiana State	6	–	14	.300	11	–	21	.344
Valparaiso	4	–	16	.200	5	–	25	.167
Bradley	2	–	18	.100	6	–	26	.188
Evansville	2	–	18	.100	4	–	28	.125
† 2024 MVC tournament winner

The 2023–24 Northern Iowa Panthers women's basketball team represented the University of Northern Iowa during the 2023–24 NCAA Division I women's basketball season. The Panthers, led by 17th-year head coach Tanya Warren, played their home games at the McLeod Center located in Cedar Falls, Iowa as members of the Missouri Valley Conference.

== Previous season ==
The Panthers finished the 2022–23 season 23–10, 16–4 in MVC play to finish in third place. In the MVC tournament, they defeated UIC in the quarterfinals, before falling to Belmont in the semifinals. They received an at-large bid into the WNIT, where they defeated Colorado State in the first round, before falling to Nebraska in the second round.

== Roster ==
2023–24 Northern Iowa Panthers women's basketball team
Players
Coaches

Pos.	#	Name	Height	Year	Previous school	Hometown
G	0	Maya McDermott	5 ft 6 in (1.68 m)	Jr	Johnston High School	Johnston, Iowa
G	2	Cailyn Morgan	5 ft 10 in (1.78 m)	Sr	Iowa City West High School	Coralville, Iowa
G	3	Ellie Foster	5 ft 11 in (1.8 m)	RS So	Green Bay	Dike, Iowa
G	4	Emerson Green	5 ft 10 in (1.78 m)	Jr	Cedar Falls High School	Cedar Falls, Iowa
F	5	Ryley Goebel	5 ft 11 in (1.8 m)	So	Center Point–Urbana High School	Urbana, Iowa
F	13	Shateah Wetering	6 ft 0 in (1.83 m)	RS So	Iowa	Montezuma, Iowa
G	22	Taryn Wharton	5 ft 5 in (1.65 m)	So	Bellevue West High School	Bellevue, Nebraska
G	23	Bri Robinson	5 ft 8 in (1.73 m)	Fr	Lincoln High School	Lincoln, Nebraska
G	24	Kayba Laube	5 ft 9 in (1.75 m)	Jr	Marion High School	Marion, Iowa
F	25	Emily Holterhaus	6 ft 2 in (1.88 m)	Sr	Pella High School	Pella, Iowa
F/C	32	Rachael Heittola	6 ft 3 in (1.91 m)	Sr	Bemidji State	Belleville, Wisconsin
F	33	Katy Reyerson	6 ft 2 in (1.88 m)	Fr	West Marshall High School	State Center, Iowa
F	42	Grace Boffeli	6 ft 1 in (1.85 m)	Jr	North Scott High School	Eldridge, Iowa

Head coach

- Tanya Warren (Creighton)

Assistant coach(es)

- Brad Nelson (Oregon)
- Nate Oakland (Northern Iowa)
- Katelin Oney (Northern Iowa)

Legend

- (C) Team captain
- (S) Suspended
- (I) Ineligible
- (W) Walk-on
- Injured
- Current redshirt

Roster
Last update: March 4, 2024

== Schedule and results ==
Date time, TV	Rank^{#}	Opponent^{#}	Result	Record	Site (attendance) city, state
Exhibition
October 30, 2023*; 6:00 pm		Wisconsin–La Crosse	W 102–51	–	McLeod Center (140); Cedar Falls, IA
Non-conference regular season
November 6, 2023*; 6:00 pm, ESPN+		Green Bay	W 78–67	1–0	McLeod Center (3,964); Cedar Falls, IA
November 12, 2023*; 2:00 pm, ESPN+		No. 3 Iowa	L 53–94	1–1	McLeod Center (6,790); Cedar Falls, IA
November 18, 2023*; 10:00 am, ESPN+		at Ball State	L 64–75	1–2	Worthen Arena (1,432); Muncie, IN
November 24, 2023*; 1:00 pm, FloHoops		vs. Syracuse; South Point Thanksgiving Shootout	L 54–71	1–3	South Point Arena (–); Enterprise, NV
November 25, 2023*; 3:30 pm, FloHoops		vs. Vanderbilt; South Point Thanksgiving Shootout	L 64–68	1–4	South Point Arena (245); Enterprise, NV
November 29, 2023*; 6:00 pm, SLN		at South Dakota	L 65–84	1–5	Sanford Coyote Sports Center (1,612); Vermillion, SD
December 3, 2023*; 1:00 pm, FloHoops		at Creighton	L 62–115	1–6	D. J. Sokol Arena (1,598); Omaha, NE
December 9, 2023*; 2:00 pm, ESPN+		South Dakota State	L 59–78	1–7	McLeod Center (4,193); Cedar Falls, IA
December 20, 2023*; 6:30 pm, ESPN+		at Iowa State	L 70–87	1–8	Hilton Coliseum (9,346); Ames, IA
MVC regular season
December 30, 2023; 1:00 pm, ESPN+		at Missouri State	L 52–54	1–9 (0–1)	Great Southern Bank Arena (2,111); Springfield, MO
January 4, 2024; 6:00 pm, ESPN+		Evansville	W 82–52	2–9 (1–1)	McLeod Center (3,781); Cedar Falls, IA
January 6, 2024; 2:00 pm, ESPN+		Indiana State	W 85–79	3–9 (2–1)	McLeod Center (3,840); Cedar Falls, IA
January 12, 2024; 7:00 pm, ESPN+		at UIC	Postponed		Credit Union 1 Arena; Chicago, IL
January 14, 2024; 1:00 pm, ESPN+		at Valparaiso	W 76–52	4–9 (3–1)	Athletics–Recreation Center (521); Valparaiso, IN
January 19, 2024; 6:00 pm, ESPN+		Murray State	W 95–75	5–9 (4–1)	McLeod Center (3,293); Cedar Falls, IA
January 21, 2024; 2:00 pm, ESPN+		Belmont	L 67–72	5–10 (4–2)	McLeod Center (3,912); Cedar Falls, IA
January 25, 2024; 6:30 pm, ESPN+		at Illinois State	L 77–88	5–11 (4–3)	CEFCU Arena (1,614); Normal, IL
January 27, 2024; 2:00 pm, ESPN+		at Bradley	W 105–59	6–11 (5–3)	Renaissance Coliseum (451); Peoria, IL
January 31, 2024; 6:00 pm, ESPN+		at UIC; Rescheduled from January 12	W 65–43	7–11 (6–3)	Credit Union 1 Arena (927); Chicago, IL
February 3, 2024; 6:00 pm, ESPN+		Drake; Rivalry	L 71–79	7–12 (6–4)	McLeod Center (4,368); Cedar Falls, IA
February 8, 2024; 6:00 pm, ESPN+		Illinois State	W 74–47	8–12 (7–4)	McLeod Center (3,834); Cedar Falls, IA
February 10, 2024; 2:00 pm, ESPN+		Bradley	W 96–61	9–12 (8–4)	McLeod Center (4,012); Cedar Falls, IA
February 15, 2024; 6:30 pm, ESPN+		at Belmont	L 72–84	9–13 (8–5)	Curb Event Center (812); Nashville, TN
February 17, 2024; 2:00 pm, ESPN+		at Murray State	W 89–87	10–13 (9–5)	CFSB Center (1,562); Murray, KY
February 22, 2024; 6:00 pm, ESPN+		Southern Illinois	W 74–51	11–13 (10–5)	McLeod Center (3,821); Cedar Falls, IA
February 25, 2024; 2:00 pm, ESPN+		at Drake; Rivalry	L 77–79	11–14 (10–6)	Knapp Center (3,646); Des Moines, IA
February 29, 2024; 6:00 pm, ESPN+		Valparaiso	W 78–59	12–14 (11–6)	McLeod Center (4,112); Cedar Falls, IA
March 2, 2024; 2:00 pm, ESPN+		UIC	W 61–52	13–14 (12–6)	McLeod Center (4,008); Cedar Falls, IA
March 7, 2024; 5:00 pm, ESPN+		at Indiana State	W 91–62	14–14 (13–6)	Hulman Center (1,141); Terre Haute, IN
March 9, 2024; 2:00 pm, ESPN+		at Evansville	W 67–46	15–14 (14–6)	Meeks Family Fieldhouse (153); Evansville, IN
MVC tournament
March 15, 2024; 2:30 p.m., ESPN+/ESPN2	(4)	vs. (5) Illinois State; Quarterfinals	W 79-75	16-14	Vibrant Arena at The MARK; Moline, IL
March 16, 2024; 1:30 p.m., ESPN+/ESPN2	(4)	vs. (1) Drake; Semifinals	L 83-92 (OT)	16-15	Vibrant Arena at The MARK; Moline, IL
WNIT
March 24, 2024*; 5:00 pm, ESPN+		at Saint Louis; Second round	L 64-68	16-16	Chaifetz Arena (511); St. Louis, MO
*Non-conference game. ^{#}Rankings from AP Poll. (#) Tournament seedings in parentheses. All times are in Central.
