= 2023–24 Valparaiso Beacons women's basketball team =

American college basketball season

2023–24 Valparaiso Beacons women's basketball
- Conference: Missouri Valley Conference
- Record: 5–23 (4–15 MVC)
- Head coach: Mary Evans (6th season)
- Assistant coaches: Emily Hays; Dominique Duck; Dominique Doseck
- Home arena: Athletics–Recreation Center

2023–24 Missouri Valley Conference women's basketball standings
	Conf.				Overall
Team	W		L	PCT	W		L	PCT
Drake †	19	–	1	.950	29	–	6	.829
Belmont	17	–	3	.850	26	–	9	.743
Missouri State	15	–	5	.750	23	–	10	.697
Northern Iowa	14	–	6	.700	16	–	16	.500
Illinois State	13	–	7	.650	22	–	12	.647
Murray State	12	–	8	.600	20	–	12	.625
UIC	10	–	10	.500	18	–	16	.529
Southern Illinois	6	–	14	.300	11	–	20	.355
Indiana State	6	–	14	.300	11	–	21	.344
Valparaiso	4	–	16	.200	5	–	25	.167
Bradley	2	–	18	.100	6	–	26	.188
Evansville	2	–	18	.100	4	–	28	.125
† 2024 MVC tournament winner

The 2023–24 Valparaiso Beacons women's basketball team represented Valparaiso University during the 2023–24 NCAA Division I women's basketball season. The Beacons, led by sixth-year head coach Mary Evans, played their home games at the Athletics–Recreation Center in Valparaiso, Indiana as members of the Missouri Valley Conference (MVC).

The Beacons finished the season 5–25, 4–16 in MVC play, to finish in tenth place. They were defeated by UIC in the opening round of the MVC tournament.

== Previous season ==
The Beacons finished the 2022–23 season 7–23, 5–15 in MVC play to finish in 11th place. They were defeated by UIC in the opening round of the MVC tournament.

== Roster ==
2023–24 Valparaiso Beacons women's basketball team
Players
Coaches

Pos.	#	Name	Height	Year	Previous school	Hometown
G	0	Jill Harris	5 ft 9 in (1.75 m)	Sr	Johnson C. Smith	Navarre, FL
G	1	Emma Tecca	5 ft 10 in (1.78 m)	RS Sr	Akron	Tallmadge, OH
G	2	Olivia Brown	5 ft 8 in (1.73 m)	Sr	St. Bonaventure	East Grand Rapids, MI
G	3	Ava Interrante	5 ft 9 in (1.75 m)	Sr	McHenry High School	McHenry, IL
G	5	Raeven Raye-Redmond	5 ft 6 in (1.68 m)	Fr	Trotwood-Madison High School	Trotwood, OH
G/F	11	Nevaeh Jackson	6 ft 0 in (1.83 m)	Fr	Northrop High School	Fort Wayne, IN
G/F	12	Saniya Jackson	6 ft 0 in (1.83 m)	Fr	Northrop High School	Fort Wayne, IN
G	15	Lauren Colon	5 ft 6 in (1.68 m)	Fr	Andrean High School	Valparaiso, Indiana
F	20	Katie Beyer	6 ft 1 in (1.85 m)	Jr	McHenry High School	McHenry, IL
G/F	21	Layla Gold	5 ft 11 in (1.8 m)	Fr	Cathedral High School	Indianapolis, IN
G/F	22	Leah Earnest	5 ft 10 in (1.78 m)	Sr	SPASH	Stevens Point, WI
F	24	Kayla Preston	6 ft 0 in (1.83 m)	Fr	Millard North High School	Omaha, NE
F	25	Ella Van Weelden	6 ft 2 in (1.88 m)	RS So	Marion High School	Cedar Rapids, IA
G	33	Olivia Sims	5 ft 9 in (1.75 m)	Jr	Oakland	Toledo, OH

Head coach

- Mary Evans (Georgia Southern)

Assistant coach(es)

- Emily Hays (Washington & Jefferson)
- Dominique Duck (Western Kentucky)
- Dominique Doseck (Ohio)

Legend

- (C) Team captain
- (S) Suspended
- (I) Ineligible
- (W) Walk-on
- Injured
- Current redshirt

Roster
Last update: May 8, 2025

== Schedule and results ==
Date time, TV	Rank^{#}	Opponent^{#}	Result	Record	Site (attendance) city, state
Non-conference regular season
November 12, 2023*; 2:00 p.m., ESPN+		at Eastern Illinois	L 62–75	0–1	Lantz Arena (545); Charleston, IL
November 18, 2023*; 1:00 p.m., ESPN+		Western Illinois	L 54–76	0–2	Athletics–Recreation Center (277); Valparaiso, IN
November 21, 2023*; 6:00 p.m., ESPN+		at Southern Miss	L 49–61	0–3	Reed Green Coliseum (1,374); Hattiesburg, MS
November 25, 2023*; 12:00 p.m., ESPN+		at UAB	L 68–78	0–4	Bartow Arena (159); Birmingham, AL
November 29, 2023*; 6:00 p.m., ESPN+		at Western Michigan	L 71–75 ^{OT}	0–5	University Arena (757); Kalamazoo, MI
December 3, 2023*; 1:00 p.m., B1G+		at Purdue	L 56–83	0–6	Mackey Arena (5,305); West Lafayette, IN
December 7, 2023*; 6:00 p.m., ESPN+		IU Northwest; Exhibition	W 65–60	–	Athletics–Recreation Center (335); Valparaiso, IN
December 9, 2023*; 1:00 p.m., ESPN+		Chicago State	W 83–64	1–6	Athletics–Recreation Center (376); Valparaiso, IN
December 19, 2023*; 1:00 p.m.		vs. Bethune–Cookman; Hatter Classic	L 35–61	1–7	Edmunds Center (162); DeLand, FL
December 20, 2023*; 10:00 a.m., ESPN+		at Stetson; Hatter Classic	L 62–78	1–8	Edmunds Center (198); DeLand, FL
MVC regular season
December 30, 2023; 5:45 p.m., ESPN+		at Murray State	L 62–90	1–9 (0–1)	CFSB Center (2,652); Murray, KY
January 4, 2024; 6:30 p.m., ESPN+		at Missouri State	L 47–67	1–10 (0–2)	Great Southern Bank Arena (1,656); Springfield, MO
January 6, 2024; 4:00 p.m., ESPN+		at Southern Illinois	L 66–75	1–11 (0–3)	Banterra Center (235); Carbondale, IL
January 12, 2024*; 6:00 p.m., ESPN+		Drake	L 54–83	1–12 (0–4)	Athletics–Recreation Center (233); Valparaiso, IN
January 14, 2024; 1:00 p.m., ESPN+		Northern Iowa	L 52–76	1–13 (0–5)	Athletics–Recreation Center (521); Valparaiso, IN
January 19, 2024; 6:00 p.m., ESPN+		Illinois State	L 68–77	1–14 (0–6)	Athletics–Recreation Center (295); Valparaiso, IN
January 21, 2024; 1:00 p.m., ESPN+		Bradley	W 79–55	2–14 (1–6)	Athletics–Recreation Center (548); Valparaiso, IN
January 26, 2024; 5:00 p.m., ESPN+		at Indiana State	L 49–70	2–15 (1–7)	Hulman Center (1,211); Terre Haute, IN
January 28, 2024; 2:00 p.m., ESPN+		at Evansville	W 70–59	3–15 (2–7)	Meeks Family Fieldhouse (375); Evansville, IN
February 4, 2024; 1:00 p.m., ESPN+		at UIC	W 71–70	4–15 (3–7)	Credit Union 1 Arena (1,843); Chicago, IL
February 9, 2024; 6:00 p.m., ESPN+		Indiana State	L 65–70	4–16 (3–8)	Athletics–Recreation Center (585); Valparaiso, IN
February 11, 2024; 1:00 p.m., ESPN+		Evansville	L 68–71	4–17 (3–9)	Athletics–Recreation Center (278); Valparaiso, IN
February 15, 2024; 6:00 p.m., ESPN+		at Bradley	W 68–50	5–17 (4–9)	Renaissance Coliseum (311); Peoria, IL
February 17, 2024; 4:00 p.m., ESPN+		at Illinois State	L 64–78	5–18 (4–10)	CEFCU Arena (2,941); Normal, IL
February 22, 2024; 6:00 p.m., ESPN+		Belmont	L 56–83	5–19 (4–11)	Athletics–Recreation Center (270); Valparaiso, IN
February 25, 2024; 1:00 p.m., ESPN+		UIC	L 59–82	5–20 (4–12)	Athletics–Recreation Center (512); Valparaiso, IN
February 29, 2024; 6:00 p.m., ESPN+		at Northern Iowa	L 59–78	5–21 (4–13)	McLeod Center (4,112); Cedar Falls, IA
March 2, 2024; 2:00 p.m., ESPN+		at Drake	L 62–82	5–22 (4–14)	Knapp Center (2,303); Des Moines, IA
March 7, 2024; 6:00 p.m., ESPN+		Southern Illinois	L 51–60	5–23 (4–15)	Athletics–Recreation Center (155); Valparaiso, IN
March 9, 2024; 1:00 p.m., ESPN+		Missouri State	L 66–77	5–24 (4–16)	Athletics–Recreation Center (466); Valparaiso, IN
MVC tournament
March 14, 2024; 6:00 p.m., ESPN+	(10)	vs. (7) UIC; Opening round	L 77–79	5–25	Vibrant Arena at The MARK (759); Moline, IL
*Non-conference game. ^{#}Rankings from AP poll. (#) Tournament seedings in parentheses. All times are in Central.
