= 2023–24 Southern Illinois Salukis women's basketball team =

American college basketball season

2023–24 Southern Illinois Salukis women's basketball
- Conference: Missouri Valley Conference
- Record: 10–19 (5–14 MVC)
- Head coach: Kelly Bond-White (2nd season)
- Associate head coach: Chester Nichols
- Assistant coaches: Jordan Jones; Marissa Webb; Cartaesha Macklin
- Home arena: Banterra Center

2023–24 Missouri Valley Conference women's basketball standings
	Conf.				Overall
Team	W		L	PCT	W		L	PCT
Drake †	19	–	1	.950	29	–	6	.829
Belmont	17	–	3	.850	26	–	9	.743
Missouri State	15	–	5	.750	23	–	10	.697
Northern Iowa	14	–	6	.700	16	–	16	.500
Illinois State	13	–	7	.650	22	–	12	.647
Murray State	12	–	8	.600	20	–	12	.625
UIC	10	–	10	.500	18	–	16	.529
Southern Illinois	6	–	14	.300	11	–	20	.355
Indiana State	6	–	14	.300	11	–	21	.344
Valparaiso	4	–	16	.200	5	–	25	.167
Bradley	2	–	18	.100	6	–	26	.188
Evansville	2	–	18	.100	4	–	28	.125
† 2024 MVC tournament winner

The 2023–24 Southern Illinois Salukis women's basketball team represented Southern Illinois University Carbondale during the 2023–24 NCAA Division I women's basketball season. The Salukis, led by second-year head coach Kelly Bond-White, played their home games at the Banterra Center in Carbondale, Illinois as members of the Missouri Valley Conference (MVC).

The Salukis finished the season 11–20, 6–14 in MVC play, to finish in a tie for eighth place. They were defeated by Indiana State in the opening round of the MVC tournament.

== Previous season ==
The Salukis finished the 2022–23 season 12–19, 8–12 in MVC play, to finish in seventh place. They defeated Indiana State in the opening round of the MVC tournament before falling to Belmont in the quarterfinals.

== Roster ==
2023–24 Southern Illinois Salukis women's basketball team
Players
Coaches

Pos.	#	Name	Height	Year	Previous school	Hometown
G	0	Quierra Love	5 ft 4 in (1.63 m)	Sr	Edwardsville High School	Glen Carbon, IL
G	1	Tyranny Brown	5 ft 8 in (1.73 m)	Jr	Heritage Christian School	Indianapolis, IN
G	2	Paige Clubb	5 ft 11 in (1.8 m)	Jr	South Callaway High School	Fulton, MO
G	3	Sydney Prochaska	5 ft 11 in (1.8 m)	Sr	Montini Catholic High School	Arlington Heights, IL
F	4	Laniah Randle	5 ft 11 in (1.8 m)	Jr	Wichita Heights High School	Wichita, KS
G	15	Maddy Saracco	5 ft 10 in (1.78 m)	Fr	Example Academy	Bolingbrook, IL
F	21	Seairra Hughes	6 ft 0 in (1.83 m)	Jr	Central Arizona College	Aurora, CO
G	22	Jaidynn Mason	5 ft 9 in (1.75 m)	So	Blue Springs South High School	Blue Springs, MO
G	23	Tkiyah Nelson	5 ft 10 in (1.78 m)	Fr	Whitfield School	St. Louis, MO
F	24	Adrianna Katcher	5 ft 11 in (1.8 m)	Sr	Center Point–Urbana High School	Urbana, IA
C	25	Angela Samuel	6 ft 2 in (1.88 m)	Fr	Nukam Sports Academy	Lagos, Nigeria
G	40	Se'Quoia Allmond	5 ft 5 in (1.65 m)	Jr	Loyola Marymount	South Memphis, TN

Head coach

- Kelly Bond-White (Illinois)

Assistant coach(es)

- Chester Nichols (Greenville)
- Jordan Jones (Texas A&M)
- Marissa Webb (Western Illinois)
- Cartaesha Macklin (Southern Illinois)

Legend

- (C) Team captain
- (S) Suspended
- (I) Ineligible
- (W) Walk-on
- Injured
- Current redshirt

Roster
Last update: March 7, 2024

== Schedule and results ==
Date time, TV	Rank^{#}	Opponent^{#}	Result	Record	Site (attendance) city, state
Exhibition
November 1, 2023*; 6:00 p.m.		Greenville	W 94–43	–	Banterra Center (121); Carbondale, IL
Non-conference regular season
November 7, 2023*; 6:00 p.m., ESPN+		Southeast Missouri State	W 85–70	1–0	Banterra Center (1,017); Carbondale, IL
November 11, 2023*; 2:00 p.m., ESPN+		Cornell	L 77–80	1–1	Banterra Center (680); Carbondale, IL
November 15, 2023*; 6:00 p.m., ESPN+		Purdue Fort Wayne	L 64–70	1–2	Banterra Center (600); Carbondale, IL
November 19, 2023*; 1:00 p.m., ESPN+		North Texas	L 73–79	1–3	Banterra Center (500); Carbondale, IL
November 23, 2023*; 9:00 a.m., FloHoops		vs. Charlotte; San Juan Shootout	W 55–52	2–3	Roberto Clemente Coliseum (250); San Juan, Puerto Rico
November 24, 2023*; 11:30 a.m., FloHoops		vs. George Washington; San Juan Shootout	W 66–55	3–3	Roberto Clemente Coliseum (250); San Juan, Puerto Rico
November 25, 2023*; 9:00 a.m., FloHoops		vs. West Virginia; San Juan Shootout	L 55–73	3–4	Roberto Clemente Coliseum (250); San Juan, Puerto Rico
December 6, 2023*; 11:00 a.m., ESPN+		SIU Edwardsville	W 77–53	4–4	Banterra Center (5,000); Carbondale, IL
December 9, 2023*; 4:00 p.m., ESPN+		Saint Louis	W 75–67	5–4	Banterra Center (600); Carbondale, IL
December 17, 2023*; 1:00 p.m., ESPN+		at Oklahoma State	L 58–76	5–5	Gallagher-Iba Arena (2,001); Stillwater, OK
MVC regular season
December 30, 2023; 1:00 p.m., ESPN+		Drake	L 59–78	5–6 (0–1)	Banterra Center (672); Carbondale, IL
January 4, 2024; 6:00 p.m., ESPN+		UIC	L 59–66	5–7 (0–2)	Banterra Center (206); Carbondale, IL
January 6, 2024; 4:00 p.m., ESPN+		Valparaiso	W 75–66	6–7 (1–2)	Banterra Center (235); Carbondale, IL
January 10, 2024; 6:30 p.m., ESPN+		at Illinois State	L 43–76	6–8 (1–3)	CEFCU Arena (1,075); Normal, IL
January 13, 2024; 2:00 p.m., ESPN+		at Bradley	L 56–58	6–9 (1–4)	Renaissance Coliseum (308); Peoria, IL
January 19, 2024; 6:00 p.m., ESPN+		Indiana State	L 63–64	6–10 (1–5)	Banterra Center (558); Carbondale, IL
January 21, 2024; 2:00 p.m., ESPN+		Evansville	W 99–60	7–10 (2–5)	Banterra Center (564); Carbondale, IL
January 26, 2024; 6:00 p.m., ESPN+		at Murray State	L 70–75	7–11 (2–6)	CFSB Center (1,931); Murray, KY
January 28, 2024; 2:00 p.m., ESPN+		at Belmont	L 64–72	7–12 (2–7)	Curb Event Center (892); Nashville, TN
February 3, 2024; 4:00 p.m., ESPN+		Missouri State	W 62–45	7–13 (2–8)	Banterra Center (887); Carbondale, IL
February 9, 2024; 6:00 p.m., ESPN+		Murray State	L 74–81	7–14 (2–9)	Banterra Center (474); Carbondale, IL
February 11, 2024; 1:00 p.m., ESPN+		Belmont	L 55–65	7–15 (2–10)	Banterra Center (325); Carbondale, IL
February 15, 2024; 6:00 p.m., ESPN+		at Evansville	L 89–93 ^{OT}	7–16 (2–11)	Meeks Family Fieldhouse (215); Evansville, IN
February 17, 2024; 12:00 p.m., ESPN+		at Indiana State	W 80–70	8–16 (3–11)	Hulman Center (1,186); Terre Haute, IN
February 22, 2024; 6:00 p.m., ESPN+		at Northern Iowa	L 51–74	8–17 (3–12)	McLeod Center (3,821); Cedar Falls, IA
February 25, 2024; 2:00 p.m., ESPN+		at Missouri State	L 42–77	8–18 (3–13)	Great Southern Bank Arena (3,229); Springfield, MO
February 29, 2024; 6:00 p.m., ESPN+		Illinois State	L 66–75 ^{OT}	8–19 (3–14)	Banterra Center (600); Carbondale, IL
March 2, 2024; 2:00 p.m., ESPN+		Bradley	W 70–54	9–19 (4–14)	Banterra Center (–); Carbondale, IL
March 7, 2024; 6:00 p.m., ESPN+		at Valparaiso	W 60–51	10–19 (5–14)	Athletics–Recreation Center (155); Valparaiso, IN
March 9, 2024; 1:00 p.m., ESPN+		at UIC	W 69–65	11–19 (6–14)	Credit Union 1 Arena (1,477); Chicago, IL
MVC tournament
March 14, 2024; 12:00 p.m., ESPN+	(8)	vs. (9) Indiana State; Opening round	L 54–66	11–20	Vibrant Arena at The MARK (776); Moline, IL
*Non-conference game. ^{#}Rankings from AP poll. (#) Tournament seedings in parentheses. All times are in Central.
