= 2023–24 Indiana State Sycamores women's basketball team =

American college basketball season

2023–24 Indiana State Sycamores women's basketball
- Conference: Missouri Valley Conference
- Record: 11-21 (6–14 MVC)
- Head coach: Chad Killinger (3rd season)
- Associate head coach: Deidra Johnson
- Assistant coaches: Kelby Fritz; Alexis Newbolt
- Home arena: Hulman Center

2023–24 Missouri Valley Conference women's basketball standings
| | Conf. | | | | Overall |
| Team | W | | L | PCT | W | | L | PCT |
|---|---|---|---|---|---|---|---|---|
| Drake † | 19 | – | 1 | .950 | 29 | – | 6 | .829 |
| Belmont | 17 | – | 3 | .850 | 26 | – | 9 | .743 |
| Missouri State | 15 | – | 5 | .750 | 23 | – | 10 | .697 |
| Northern Iowa | 14 | – | 6 | .700 | 16 | – | 16 | .500 |
| Illinois State | 13 | – | 7 | .650 | 22 | – | 12 | .647 |
| Murray State | 12 | – | 8 | .600 | 20 | – | 12 | .625 |
| UIC | 10 | – | 10 | .500 | 18 | – | 16 | .529 |
| Southern Illinois | 6 | – | 14 | .300 | 11 | – | 20 | .355 |
| Indiana State | 6 | – | 14 | .300 | 11 | – | 21 | .344 |
| Valparaiso | 4 | – | 16 | .200 | 5 | – | 25 | .167 |
| Bradley | 2 | – | 18 | .100 | 6 | – | 26 | .188 |
| Evansville | 2 | – | 18 | .100 | 4 | – | 28 | .125 |
† 2024 MVC tournament winner

The 2023–24 Indiana State Sycamores women's basketball team represented Indiana State University during the 2023–24 NCAA Division I women's basketball season. The Sycamores, led by third-year head coach Chad Killinger, played their home games at the Hulman Center in Terre Haute, Indiana as members of the Missouri Valley Conference.

== Previous season ==
The Sycamores finished the 2022–23 season 11–19, 6–14 in MVC play to finish in a tie for ninth place. They were defeated by Southern Illinois in the opening round of the MVC tournament.

== Roster ==
2023–24 Indiana State Sycamores women's basketball team
Players
Coaches

| Pos. | # | Name | Height | Year | Previous school | Hometown |
|---|---|---|---|---|---|---|
| F | 00 | Mya Glanton | 6 ft 0 in (1.83 m) | RS Sr | East St. Louis High School | East St. Louis, Illinois |
| G | 1 | Asia Donald | 5 ft 9 in (1.75 m) | Fr | Hobart High School | Hobart, Indiana |
| G | 2 | Savannah White | 6 ft 2 in (1.88 m) | So | Wisconsin | St. Paul, Minnesota |
| G | 3 | Jailah Pelly | 5 ft 9 in (1.75 m) | Fr | O'Fallon Township High School | Belleville, Illinois |
| G | 4 | Ella Sawyer | 5 ft 9 in (1.75 m) | Sr | Austin Peay | Adelaide, Australia |
| G | 8 | Kiley Bess | 6 ft 0 in (1.83 m) | Sr | Saint Louis | Poplar Bluff, Missouri |
| G | 10 | Deja Jones | 5 ft 9 in (1.75 m) | Jr | Cochise College | San Antonio, Texas |
| G | 11 | Olivia Medford | 5 ft 11 in (1.8 m) | Jr | Monroe College | Rockville Centre, New York |
| G | 12 | Keslyn Secrist | 5 ft 10 in (1.78 m) | Fr | Pulaski County High School | Draper, Virginia |
| F | 13 | Saige Stahl | 6 ft 1 in (1.85 m) | Fr | Columbus East High School | Seymour, Indiana |
| F | 14 | Leah Yarbrough | 6 ft 0 in (1.83 m) | Jr | UIC | Indianapolis, Indiana |
| F | 23 | Chloe Williams | 6 ft 3 in (1.91 m) | So | Tulsa | Los Angeles, California |
| F | 24 | Chelsea Cain | 6 ft 0 in (1.83 m) | Sr | Nicholls | Prairieville, Louisiana |
| C | 31 | Lily Niebuhr | 6 ft 3 in (1.91 m) | So | Chaska High School | Jordan, Minnesota |
| G | 33 | Bella Finnegan | 6 ft 0 in (1.83 m) | So | Mother McAuley High School | Hometown, Illinois |

Head coach

- Chad Killinger (Franklin (IN))

Assistant coach(es)

- Deidra Johnson (Oklahoma State)
- Kelby Fritz (Rogers State)
- Alexis Newbolt (Indiana State)

Legend

- (C) Team captain
- (S) Suspended
- (I) Ineligible
- (W) Walk-on
- Injured
- Current redshirt

Roster
Last update: March 5, 2024

== Schedule and results ==
| Date time, TV | Rank^{#} | Opponent^{#} | Result | Record | Site (attendance) city, state |
Non-conference regular season
| November 6, 2023*; 7:00 pm, ESPN+ | | at Northern Kentucky | W 85–82 ^{OT} | 1–0 | Truist Arena (945); Highland Heights, KY |
| November 9, 2023*; 8:00 pm, SECN+ | | at Missouri | L 57–98 | 1–1 | Mizzou Arena (3,800); Columbia, MO |
| November 15, 2023*; 11:00 am, ESPN+ | | Illinois–Springfield | L 69–71 | 1–2 | Hulman Center (2,311); Terre Haute, IN |
| November 18, 2023*; 1:00 pm, ESPN+ | | Wright State | L 63–72 | 1–3 | Hulman Center (1,142); Terre Haute, IN |
| November 23, 2023*; 11:00 am | | vs. Radford; Puerto Rico Clasico | W 64–52 | 2–3 | Coliseo Rubén Rodríguez (100); Bayamón, PR |
| November 25, 2023*; 11:00 am | | vs. Northern Illinois; Puerto Rico Clasico | L 62–67 | 2–4 | Coliseo Rubén Rodríguez (100); Bayamón, PR |
| December 2, 2023*; 1:00 pm, ESPN+ | | at Central Michigan | W 73–65 | 3–4 | McGuirk Arena (1,070); Mount Pleasant, MI |
| December 10, 2023*; 1:00 pm, ESPN+ | | Southeast Missouri State | W 65–57 | 4–4 | Hulman Center (1,216); Terre Haute, IN |
| December 17, 2023*; 6:00 pm, ESPN+ | | at Ohio | L 62–65 | 4–5 | Convocation Center (355); Athens, OH |
| December 20, 2023*; 11:00 am, B1G+ | | at Purdue | L 63–79 | 4–6 | Mackey Arena (7,177); West Lafayette, IN |
MVC regular season
| December 30, 2023; 7:00 pm, ESPN+ | | at Evansville | W 66–49 | 5–6 (1–0) | Meeks Family Fieldhouse (409); Evansville, IN |
| January 4, 2024; 7:00 pm, ESPN+ | | at Drake | L 47–77 | 5–7 (1–1) | Knapp Center (1,843); Des Moines, IA |
| January 6, 2024; 3:00 pm, ESPN+ | | at Northern Iowa | L 79–85 | 5–8 (1–2) | McLeod Center (3,840); Cedar Falls, IA |
| January 11, 2024; 6:00 pm, ESPN+ | | Murray State | L 63–75 | 5–9 (1–3) | Hulman Center (1,338); Terre Haute, IN |
| January 14, 2024; 1:00 pm, ESPN+ | | Belmont | L 56–61 | 5–10 (1–4) | Hulman Center (1,177); Terre Haute, IN |
| January 19, 2024; 7:00 pm, ESPN+ | | at Southern Illinois | W 64–63 | 6–10 (2–4) | Banterra Center (558); Carbondale, IL |
| January 21, 2024; 3:00 pm, ESPN+ | | at Missouri State | L 71–89 | 6–11 (2–5) | Great Southern Bank Arena (2,353); Springfield, MO |
| January 26, 2024; 6:00 pm, ESPN+ | | Valparaiso | W 70–49 | 7–11 (3–5) | Hulman Center (1,211); Terre Haute, IN |
| January 28, 2024; 1:00 pm, ESPN+ | | UIC | L 48–76 | 7–12 (3–6) | Hulman Center (1,336); Terre Haute, IN |
| February 4, 2024; 1:00 pm, ESPN+ | | Illinois State | L 59–64 | 7–13 (3–7) | Hulman Center (1,209); Terre Haute, IN |
| February 9, 2024; 7:00 pm, ESPN+ | | at Valparaiso | W 70–65 | 8–13 (4–7) | Athletics–Recreation Center (585); Valparaiso, IN |
| February 11, 2024; 1:00 pm, ESPN+ | | at UIC | L 53–68 | 8–14 (4–8) | Credit Union 1 Arena (1,040); Chicago, IL |
| February 15, 2024; 6:00 pm, ESPN+ | | Missouri State | L 51–59 | 8–15 (4–9) | Hulman Center (1,215); Terre Haute, IN |
| February 17, 2024; 1:00 pm, ESPN+ | | Southern Illinois | L 70–80 | 8–16 (4–10) | Hulman Center (1,186); Terre Haute, IN |
| February 22, 2024; 6:00 pm, ESPN+ | | Evansville | W 69–66 | 9–16 (5–10) | Hulman Center (1,245); Terre Haute, IN |
| February 25, 2024; 3:00 pm, ESPN+ | | at Bradley | W 74–67 | 10–16 (6–10) | Renaissance Coliseum (343); Peoria, IL |
| March 1, 2024; 7:30 pm, ESPN+ | | at Belmont | L 62–87 | 10–17 (6–11) | Curb Event Center (789); Nashville, TN |
| March 3, 2024; 3:00 pm, ESPN+ | | at Murray State | L 70–87 | 10–18 (6–12) | CFSB Center (1,421); Murray, KY |
| March 7, 2024; 6:00 pm, ESPN+ | | Northern Iowa | L 62–91 | 10–19 (6–13) | Hulman Center (1,141); Terre Haute, IN |
| March 9, 2024; 1:00 pm, ESPN+ | | Drake | L 64-96 | 10-20 (6-14) | Hulman Center (1,261); Terre Haute, IN |
MVC tournament
| March 14, 2024; 12:00 PM, ESPN+ | (9) | vs. (8) Southern Illinois; Opening Round | W 66-54 | 11-20 | Vibrant Arena at The MARK; Moline, IL |
| March 15, 2024; 12:00 PM, ESPN+ | (9) | vs. (1) Drake; Quarterfinals | L 57-79 | 11-21 | Vibrant Arena at The MARK; Moline, IL |
*Non-conference game. ^{#}Rankings from AP Poll. (#) Tournament seedings in parentheses. All times are in Eastern.
