= 2023–24 Drake Bulldogs women's basketball team =

American college basketball season

2023–24 Drake Bulldogs women's basketball

MVC regular-season and tournament champions

NCAA tournament, first round
- Conference: Missouri Valley Conference
- Record: 29–6 (19–1 MVC)
- Head coach: Allison Pohlman (3rd season)
- Assistant coaches: Nicci Hays Fort; Whitney Moia; Kelli Greenway
- Home arena: Knapp Center

2023–24 Missouri Valley Conference women's basketball standings
	Conf.				Overall
Team	W		L	PCT	W		L	PCT
Drake †	19	–	1	.950	29	–	6	.829
Belmont	17	–	3	.850	26	–	9	.743
Missouri State	15	–	5	.750	23	–	10	.697
Northern Iowa	14	–	6	.700	16	–	16	.500
Illinois State	13	–	7	.650	22	–	12	.647
Murray State	12	–	8	.600	20	–	12	.625
UIC	10	–	10	.500	18	–	16	.529
Southern Illinois	6	–	14	.300	11	–	20	.355
Indiana State	6	–	14	.300	11	–	21	.344
Valparaiso	4	–	16	.200	5	–	25	.167
Bradley	2	–	18	.100	6	–	26	.188
Evansville	2	–	18	.100	4	–	28	.125
† 2024 MVC tournament winner

The 2023–24 Drake Bulldogs women's basketball team represented Drake University during the 2023–24 NCAA Division I women's basketball season. The Bulldogs, led by third-year head coach Allison Pohlman, played their home games at the Knapp Center in Des Moines, Iowa as members of the Missouri Valley Conference (MVC).

The Bulldogs finished the season 29–6, 19–1 in MVC play, to finish in first place. In the MVC tournament, they defeated Indiana State in the quarterfinals, Northern Iowa in the semifinals, and Missouri State to win the MVC tournament championship and earn the conference's automatic bid into the NCAA tournament. They received the #12 seed in the Albany Regional 2, where they would lose to #5 region seed Colorado in the first round.

== Previous season ==
The Bulldogs finished the 2022–23 season 22–10, 14–6 in MVC play, to finish in a tie for fourth place. In the MVC tournament, they defeated Missouri State in the quarterfinals, upset top-seeded Illinois State in the semifinals and Belmont to win the MVC tournament championship and earn the conference's automatic bid into the NCAA tournament. They received the #12 seed in the Seattle Regional 4, where they lost to #5 region seed Louisville in the first round.

== Roster ==
2023–24 Drake Bulldogs women's basketball team
Players
Coaches

Pos.	#	Name	Height	Year	Previous school	Hometown
G	1	Hannah Nilges	5 ft 7 in (1.7 m)	Jr	Jefferson City High School	Jefferson City, MO
G	3	Taylor McAulay	5 ft 11 in (1.8 m)	RS Sr	Centennial High School	Lino Lakes, MN
G	4	Shannon Fornshell	6 ft 1 in (1.85 m)	Fr	Wayzata High School	Plymouth, MN
G	10	Katie Dinnebier	5 ft 8 in (1.73 m)	Jr	Waukee High School	West Des Moines, IA
G	11	Megan Meyer	5 ft 8 in (1.73 m)	GS	Mason City High School	Mason City, IA
F	12	Ashley Iiams	6 ft 1 in (1.85 m)	Jr	Ames High School	Ames, IA
C	14	Anna Miller	6 ft 3 in (1.91 m)	Jr	Rochester Mayo High School	Rochester, MN
G	20	Emily Christenson	5 ft 11 in (1.8 m)	Fr	East Ridge High School	Woodbury, MN
G	21	Ava Hawthorne	5 ft 9 in (1.75 m)	So	Gilbert High School	Ames, IA
G	22	Brooklin Dailey	6 ft 0 in (1.83 m)	Fr	Southeast Polk High School	Pleasant Hill, IA
G	24	Anna Brown	5 ft 10 in (1.78 m)	GS	Loyola Chicago	Waukee, IA
F	30	Taedyn Gray (injured)	6 ft 2 in (1.88 m)	So	Shawnee Mission West High School	Lenexa, KS
F	32	Courtney Becker	6 ft 0 in (1.83 m)	Sr	La Crosse Aquinas High School	Fountain City, WI
F	43	Grace Berg	6 ft 0 in (1.83 m)	GS	Indianola High School	Indianola, IA

Head coach

- Allison Pohlman (Northern Iowa)

Assistant coach(es)

- Nicci Hays Fort (Culver–Stockton)
- Whitney Moia (MidAmerica Nazarene)
- Kelli Greenway (Iowa)

Legend

- (C) Team captain
- (S) Suspended
- (I) Ineligible
- (W) Walk-on
- Injured
- Current redshirt

Roster
Last update: March 3, 2024

== Schedule and results ==
Date time, TV	Rank^{#}	Opponent^{#}	Result	Record	Site (attendance) city, state
Exhibition
October 29, 2023*; 2:00 p.m.		Upper Iowa	W 87–40	–	Knapp Center (1,858); Des Moines, IA
November 1, 2023*; 6:00 p.m.		Winona State	W 94–60	–	Knapp Center (1,609); Des Moines, IA
Non-conference regular season
November 6, 2023*; 6:00 p.m., ESPN+		St. Thomas	W 94–69	1–0	Knapp Center (2,108); Des Moines, IA
November 9, 2023*; 7:00 p.m., ESPN+		at Saint Louis	W 78–66	2–0	Chaifetz Arena (602); St. Louis, MO
November 12, 2023*; 2:00 p.m., ESPN+		Iowa State	W 85–73	3–0	Knapp Center (4,203); Des Moines, IA
November 19, 2023*; 6:00 p.m., FS1		at No. 2 Iowa	L 90–113	3–1	Carver–Hawkeye Arena (14,998); Iowa City, IA
November 24, 2023*; 2:00 p.m., ESPN+		Louisiana Tech; Vibrant Thanksgiving Classic	W 77–66	4–1	Knapp Center (1,734); Des Moines, IA
November 25, 2023*; 2:00 p.m., ESPN+		Richmond; Vibrant Thanksgiving Classic	L 66–74	4–2	Knapp Center (1,861); Des Moines, IA
November 26, 2023*; 2:00 p.m., ESPN+		Maine; Vibrant Thanksgiving Classic	W 72–56	5–2	Knapp Center (1,765); Des Moines, IA
December 2, 2023*; 1:00 p.m., B1G+		at Minnesota	L 88–94 ^{2OT}	5–3	Williams Arena (4,578); Minneapolis, MN
December 8, 2023*; 11:00 a.m., ESPN+		North Dakota State	W 77–67	6–3	Knapp Center (6,424); Des Moines, IA
December 17, 2023*; 2:00 p.m., ESPN+		No. 20 Creighton	L 78–89	6–4	Knapp Center (3,108); Des Moines, IA
December 21, 2023*; 12:00 p.m., MidcoSN/SLN		at North Dakota	W 108–60	7–4	Betty Engelstad Sioux Center (1,361); Grand Forks, ND
MVC regular season
December 30, 2023; 1:00 p.m., ESPN+		at Southern Illinois	W 78–59	8–4 (1–0)	Banterra Center (672); Carbondale, IL
January 4, 2024; 6:00 p.m., ESPN+		Indiana State	W 77–47	9–4 (2–0)	Knapp Center (1,843); Des Moines, IA
January 6, 2024; 2:00 p.m., ESPN+		Evansville	W 78–68	10–4 (3–0)	Knapp Center (2,193); Des Moines, IA
January 12, 2024; 6:00 p.m., ESPN+		at Valparaiso	W 83–54	11–4 (4–0)	Athletics–Recreation Center (233); Valparaiso, IN
January 14, 2024; 1:00 p.m., ESPN+		at UIC	W 82–62	12–4 (5–0)	Credit Union 1 Arena (1,121); Chicago, IL
January 19, 2024; 6:00 p.m., ESPN+		Belmont	W 69–65	13–4 (6–0)	Knapp Center (2,134); Des Moines, IA
January 21, 2024; 2:00 p.m., ESPN+		Murray State	W 107–98	14–4 (7–0)	Knapp Center (2,184); Des Moines, IA
January 25, 2024; 6:00 p.m., ESPN+		at Bradley	W 77–65	15–4 (8–0)	Renaissance Coliseum (393); Peoria, IL
January 27, 2024; 4:00 p.m., ESPN+		at Illinois State	L 70–79	15–5 (8–1)	CEFCU Arena (2,487); Normal, IL
February 3, 2024; 6:00 p.m., ESPN+		at Northern Iowa	W 79–71	16–5 (9–1)	McLeod Center (4,368); Cedar Falls, IA
February 8, 2024; 6:00 p.m., ESPN+		Bradley	W 71–60	17–5 (10–1)	Knapp Center (2,262); Des Moines, IA
February 10, 2024; 2:00 p.m., ESPN+		Illinois State	W 79–64	18–5 (11–1)	Knapp Center (3,792); Des Moines, IA
February 15, 2024; 6:00 p.m., ESPN+		at Murray State	W 81–75	19–5 (12–1)	CFSB Center (1,762); Murray, KY
February 17, 2024; 4:00 p.m., ESPN+		at Belmont	W 77–71	20–5 (13–1)	Curb Event Center (1,191); Nashville, TN
February 22, 2024; 6:00 p.m., ESPN+		Missouri State	W 76–65	21–5 (14–1)	Knapp Center (2,448); Des Moines, IA
February 25, 2024; 2:00 p.m., ESPN+		Northern Iowa	W 79–77	22–5 (15–1)	Knapp Center (3,646); Des Moines, IA
February 29, 2024; 6:00 p.m., ESPN+		UIC	W 84–63	23–5 (16–1)	Knapp Center (2,288); Des Moines, IA
March 2, 2024; 2:00 p.m., ESPN+		Valparaiso	W 82–62	24–5 (17–1)	Knapp Center (2,303); Des Moines, IA
March 7, 2024; 6:00 p.m., ESPN+		at Evansville	W 86–53	25–5 (18–1)	Meeks Family Fieldhouse (167); Evansville, IN
March 9, 2024; 12:00 p.m., ESPN+		at Indiana State	W 96–64	26–5 (19–1)	Hulman Center (1,261); Terre Haute, IN
MVC women's tournament
March 15, 2024; 12:00 p.m., ESPN+	(1)	vs. (9) Indiana State; Quarterfinals	W 79–57	27–5	Vibrant Arena at The MARK (1,515); Moline, IL
March 16, 2024; 1:30 p.m., ESPN+	(1)	vs. (4) Northern Iowa; Semifinals	W 92–83	28–5	Vibrant Arena at The MARK (1,747); Moline, IL
March 17, 2024; 1:00 p.m., ESPN2/ESPN+	(1)	vs. (3) Missouri State; Finals	W 76–75	29–5	Vibrant Arena at The MARK (1,305); Moline, IL
NCAA women's tournament
March 22, 2024*; 6:00 p.m., ESPNews	(12 A2)	vs. (5 A2) No. 17 Colorado; First round	L 72–86	29–6	Bramlage Coliseum (9,642); Manhattan, KS
*Non-conference game. ^{#}Rankings from AP poll. (#) Tournament seedings in parentheses. A2=Albany 2. All times are in Central.
