= 2023–24 Illinois State Redbirds women's basketball team =

American college basketball season

2023–24 Illinois State Redbirds women's basketball

WNIT, Super 16
- Conference: Missouri Valley Conference
- Record: 21–11 (13–7 MVC)
- Head coach: Kristen Gillespie (7th season)
- Associate head coach: Scott Gillespie
- Assistant coaches: Drew Cole; Katrina Beck; Jordan Alford; Mannie Robinson
- Home arena: CEFCU Arena

2023–24 Missouri Valley Conference women's basketball standings
	Conf.				Overall
Team	W		L	PCT	W		L	PCT
Drake †	19	–	1	.950	29	–	6	.829
Belmont	17	–	3	.850	26	–	9	.743
Missouri State	15	–	5	.750	23	–	10	.697
Northern Iowa	14	–	6	.700	16	–	16	.500
Illinois State	13	–	7	.650	22	–	12	.647
Murray State	12	–	8	.600	20	–	12	.625
UIC	10	–	10	.500	18	–	16	.529
Southern Illinois	6	–	14	.300	11	–	20	.355
Indiana State	6	–	14	.300	11	–	21	.344
Valparaiso	4	–	16	.200	5	–	25	.167
Bradley	2	–	18	.100	6	–	26	.188
Evansville	2	–	18	.100	4	–	28	.125
† 2024 MVC tournament winner

The 2023–24 Illinois State Redbirds women's basketball team represented Illinois State University during the 2023–24 NCAA Division I women's basketball season. The Redbirds, led by seventh-year head coach Kristen Gillespie, played their home games at CEFCU Arena in Normal, Illinois as members of the Missouri Valley Conference.

== Previous season ==
The Redbirds finished the 2022–23 season 24–9, 17–3 in MVC play to finish in a tie for first place. In the MVC tournament, they defeated Murray State in the quarterfinals, before being upset by eventual tournament champions Drake in the semifinals. They received an automatic bid into the WNIT, where they would lose to Missouri in the first round.

== Roster ==
2023–24 Illinois State Redbirds women's basketball team
Players
Coaches

Pos.	#	Name	Height	Year	Previous school	Hometown
G	0	Shannon Dowell	5 ft 10 in (1.78 m)	Fr	O'Fallon Township High School	O'Fallon, Illinois
G	1	Molly Lenz	5 ft 8 in (1.73 m)	Fr	Eden Prairie High School	Eden Prairie, Minnesota
G	3	Abbie Aalsma	5 ft 9 in (1.75 m)	So	Waupun High School	Waupun, Wisconsin
G	4	Lauren Cohen	5 ft 8 in (1.73 m)	Jr	Glenbard South High School	Wheaton, Illinois
G	5	Daijah Smith	5 ft 11 in (1.8 m)	Sr	Wabash Valley College	Gary, Indiana
G	11	Caroline Waite	5 ft 4 in (1.63 m)	Jr	Bradley	Ames, Iowa
G	12	Maya Wong	5 ft 8 in (1.73 m)	RS Sr	Normal Community High School	Normal, Illinois
G	13	Brooke Coffey	6 ft 1 in (1.85 m)	Fr	Incarnate Word Academy	St. Charles, Missouri
G	15	Taylor Veach	5 ft 11 in (1.8 m)	So	Central DeWitt High School	DeWitt, Iowa
F	24	DeAnna Wilson	6 ft 2 in (1.88 m)	GS	Moberly Area Community College	St. Louis, Missouri
F/C	25	Lexi Boles	6 ft 3 in (1.91 m)	Jr	Dowling Catholic High School	Des Moines, Iowa
F	32	Kate Bullman	6 ft 2 in (1.88 m)	Sr	Grayslake Central High School	Grayslake, Illinois
F	33	Hannah Kelle	6 ft 2 in (1.88 m)	GS	Lincoln Southwest High School	Lincoln, Nebraska
F	52	Savannah McGowan	6 ft 2 in (1.88 m)	Fr	Armstrong High School	Plymouth, Minnesota

Head coach

- Kristen Gillespie (NC State)

Assistant coach(es)

- Scott Gillespie (Ripon)
- Drew Cole (Aurora)
- Katrina Beck (Illinois State)
- Jordan Alford (Columbia (MO))
- Mannie Robinson (Talladega)

Legend

- (C) Team captain
- (S) Suspended
- (I) Ineligible
- (W) Walk-on
- Injured
- Current redshirt

Roster
Last update: March 4, 2024

== Schedule and results ==
Date time, TV	Rank^{#}	Opponent^{#}	Result	Record	Site (attendance) city, state
Exhibition
October 29, 2023*; 1:00 pm		Illinois Wesleyan	W 94–56	–	CEFCU Arena (–); Normal, IL
Non-conference regular season
November 6, 2023*; 5:00 pm, SLN		at Omaha	W 105–59	1–0	Baxter Arena (512); Omaha, NE
November 11, 2023*; 12:00 pm, ESPN+		at Mount St. Mary's	L 62–88	1–1	Baxter Arena (1,863); Omaha, NE
November 15, 2023*; 11:00 am, ESPN+		SIU Edwardsville	W 90–86	2–1	CEFCU Arena (7,581); Normal, IL
November 19, 2023*; 2:00 pm, ESPN+		St. Francis (IL)	W 89–51	3–1	CEFCU Arena (1,039); Normal, IL
November 24, 2023*; 6:00 pm		vs. UT Arlington; Saint Mary's Thanksgiving Classic	W 87–63	4–1	University Credit Union Pavilion (89); Moraga, CA
November 25, 2023*; 5:30 pm, ESPN+		at Saint Mary's; Saint Mary's Thanksgiving Classic	W 62–51	5–1	University Credit Union Pavilion (352); Moraga, CA
November 30, 2023*; 6:30 pm, ESPN+		Chicago State	W 102–47	6–1	CEFCU Arena (916); Normal, IL
December 3, 2023*; 1:00 pm, ACCNX		at No. 5 NC State	L 61–79	6–2	Reynolds Coliseum (5,500); Raleigh, NC
December 10, 2023*; 2:00 pm, ESPN+		No. 19 Marquette	L 62–64	6–3	CEFCU Arena (2,129); Normal, IL
December 19, 2023*; 6:30 pm, ESPN+		Saint Louis	W 87–81	7–3	CEFCU Arena (1,281); Normal, IL
MVC regular season
December 30, 2023; 4:00 pm, ESPN+		Bradley; I-74 Rivalry	W 78–74	8–3 (1–0)	CEFCU Arena (2,241); Normal, IL
January 4, 2024; 6:30 pm, ESPN+		at Belmont	L 52–64	8–4 (1–1)	Curb Event Center (878); Nashville, TN
January 6, 2024; 2:00 pm, ESPN+		at Murray State	L 55–90	8–5 (1–2)	CFSB Center (1,631); Murray, KY
January 10, 2024; 6:30 pm, ESPN+		Southern Illinois	W 76–43	9–5 (2–2)	CEFCU Arena (1,075); Normal, IL
January 14, 2024; 6:00 pm, ESPN+		Missouri State	W 85–78	10–5 (3–2)	CEFCU Arena (1,056); Normal, IL
January 19, 2024; 6:00 pm, ESPN+		at Valparaiso	W 77–68	11–5 (4–2)	Athletics–Recreation Center (295); Valparaiso, IN
January 21, 2024; 1:00 pm, ESPN+		at UIC	L 79–86 ^{OT}	11–6 (4–3)	Credit Union 1 Arena (1,731); Chicago, IL
January 25, 2024; 6:30 pm, ESPN+		Northern Iowa	W 88–77	12–6 (5–3)	CEFCU Arena (1,614); Normal, IL
January 27, 2024; 4:00 pm, Marquee/ESPN+		Drake	W 79–70	13–6 (6–3)	CEFCU Arena (2,487); Normal, IL
February 4, 2024; 12:00 pm, ESPN+		at Indiana State	W 64–59	14–6 (7–3)	Hulman Center (1,209); Terre Haute, IN
February 8, 2024; 6:00 pm, ESPN+		at Northern Iowa	L 47–74	14–7 (7–4)	McLeod Center (3,834); Cedar Falls, IA
February 10, 2024; 2:00 pm, ESPN+		at Drake	L 64–79	14–8 (7–5)	Knapp Center (3,792); Des Moines, IA
February 15, 2024; 6:30 pm, ESPN+		UIC	W 64–61	15–8 (8–5)	CEFCU Arena (1,379); Normal, IL
February 17, 2024; 5:00 pm, ESPN+		Valparaiso	W 78–64	16–8 (9–5)	CEFCU Arena (2,941); Normal, IL
February 22, 2024; 7:00 pm, ESPN+		at Bradley; I-74 Rivalry	W 68–50	17–8 (10–5)	Renaissance Coliseum (510); Peoria, IL
February 25, 2024; 2:00 pm, ESPN+		Evansville	W 78–50	18–8 (11–5)	CEFCU Arena (2,412); Normal, IL
February 29, 2024; 6:00 pm, ESPN+		at Southern Illinois	W 75–66	19–8 (12–5)	Banterra Center (600); Carbondale, IL
March 2, 2024; 2:00 pm, MVCN/ESPN+		at Missouri State	L 62–67	19–9 (12–6)	Great Southern Bank Arena (3,030); Springfield, MO
March 7, 2024; 6:30 pm, ESPN+		Murray State	W 85–75	20–9 (13–6)	CEFCU Arena (1,472); Normal, IL
March 9, 2024; 4:00 pm, ESPN+		Belmont	L 69-72	20-10 (13-7)	CEFCU Arena (1,725); Normal, IL
MVC tournament
March 14, 2024; 2:30 pm, ESPN+	(5)	vs. (12) Evansville; Opening Round	W 85-64	21-10	Vibrant Arena at The MARK (776); Moline, IL
March 15, 2024; 2:30 pm, ESPN+	(5)	vs. (4) Northern Iowa; Quarterfinals	L 75-79	21-11	Vibrant Arena at The MARK (1,515); Moline, IL
WNIT
March 24, 2024*; 4:00 pm, ESPN+		Charleston; Second round	W 74-67	22–11	CEFCU Arena (1,537); Normal, IL
March 28, 2024*; 7:00 pm, BTN+		at Wisconsin; Super 16	L 61-86	22–12	Kohl Center (3,133); Madison, WI
*Non-conference game. ^{#}Rankings from AP Poll. (#) Tournament seedings in parentheses. All times are in Central.
