= 2023–24 Saint Louis Billikens women's basketball team =

American college basketball season

2023–24 Saint Louis Billikens women's basketball
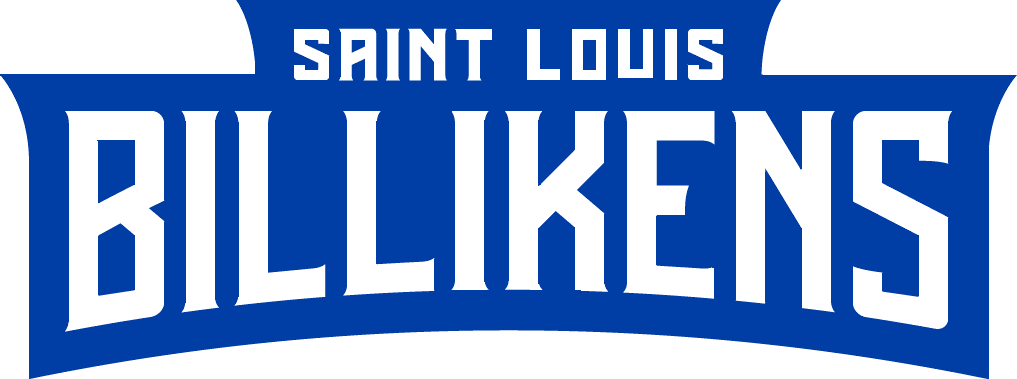

WNIT champions
- Conference: Atlantic 10 Conference
- Record: 22–18 (9–9 A-10)
- Head coach: Rebecca Tillett (2nd season)
- Associate head coach: Jimmy Colloton
- Assistant coaches: Kelsey Johnson; Tra'Dayja Smith
- Home arena: Chaifetz Arena

2023–24 Atlantic 10 women's basketball standings
	Conf.				Overall
Team	W		L	PCT	W		L	PCT
Richmond †	16	–	2	.889	29	–	6	.829
VCU	15	–	3	.833	26	–	6	.813
Saint Joseph's	15	–	3	.833	28	–	6	.824
George Mason	14	–	4	.778	23	–	8	.742
Duquesne	13	–	5	.722	21	–	13	.618
Rhode Island	10	–	8	.556	21	–	14	.600
Saint Louis	9	–	9	.500	22	–	18	.550
Davidson*	8	–	10	.444	18	–	8	.692
Loyola Chicago	8	–	10	.444	15	–	16	.484
Fordham	8	–	10	.444	12	–	17	.414
George Washington	6	–	12	.333	13	–	18	.419
Dayton	5	–	13	.278	12	–	19	.387
La Salle	5	–	13	.278	8	–	22	.267
UMass	2	–	16	.111	5	–	27	.156
St. Bonaventure	1	–	17	.056	4	–	26	.133
† 2024 A10 tournament winner * Season cancelled on March 1, 2024.

The 2023–24 Saint Louis Billikens women's basketball team represented Saint Louis University during the 2023–24 NCAA Division I women's basketball season. The Billikens, led by second-year head coach Rebecca Tillett, played their home games at Chaifetz Arena in St. Louis, Missouri as members of the Atlantic 10 Conference (A-10).

== Previous season ==
The Billikens finished the 2022–23 season 17–18, 10–6 in A-10 play, to finish in a tie for third place. They defeated Saint Joseph's, Rhode Island and UMass to win their first-ever A-10 tournament championship, to clinch the conference's automatic bid into the NCAA tournament, their first NCAA tournament appearance in program history. They were placed in the Seattle Regional 3 as the #13 seed, where they were defeated by Tennessee in the first round.

== Roster ==
2023–24 Saint Louis Billikens women's basketball team
Players
Coaches

Pos.	#	Name	Height	Year	Previous school	Hometown
G	00	Kyla McMakin	5 ft 11 in (1.8 m)	GS	Longwood	Virginia Beach, VA
G	2	Camreé Clegg	5 ft 5 in (1.65 m)	GS	St. John's	Westland, MI
PG	4	Kennedy Calhoun	5 ft 5 in (1.65 m)	Jr	Longwood	Harrisburg, NC
PG	10	Isabel Tillett	5 ft 10 in (1.78 m)	RS So	Longwood	Manassas, VA
G	11	Julia Martinez	5 ft 10 in (1.78 m)	GS	Loyola Academy	Chicago, IL
F	12	Tierra Simon	6 ft 1 in (1.85 m)	Jr	Pearl River Community College	Houston, TX
G	15	Ashleigh Connor	5 ft 11 in (1.8 m)	RS Fr	Mt. Lebanon High School	Pittsburgh, PA
F	21	Nafatoumata Haidara	6 ft 5 in (1.96 m)	GS	Chicago State	Bamako, Mali
G/F	22	Mia Nicastro	6 ft 2 in (1.88 m)	So	St. Charles West High School	St. Charles, MO
C	25	Marcavia Shavers	6 ft 2 in (1.88 m)	Jr	Pearl River Community College	Biloxi, MS
F	32	Peyton Kennedy	5 ft 11 in (1.8 m)	Sr	Boylan Catholic High School	Rockford, IL
G/F	35	Bri Johns	5 ft 11 in (1.8 m)	Sr	Longwood	Alexandria, VA
G	45	Brooklyn Gray	5 ft 11 in (1.8 m)	So	Wabash Valley College	Rockford, IL

Head coach

- Rebecca Tillett (William & Mary)

Assistant coach(es)

- Jimmy Colloton (Wittenberg)
- Kelsey Johnson (Bridgewater State)
- Tra'Dayja Smith (Longwood)

Legend

- (C) Team captain
- (S) Suspended
- (I) Ineligible
- (W) Walk-on
- Injured
- Current redshirt

Roster
Last update: December 21, 2023

== Schedule and results ==
Date time, TV	Rank^{#}	Opponent^{#}	Result	Record	High points	High rebounds	High assists	Site (attendance) city, state
Exhibition
November 1, 2023*; 5:00 pm		Missouri S&T	W 100–65	–	26 – Kennedy	10 – Martinez	8 – Martinez	Chaifetz Arena (237); St. Louis, MO
Non-conference regular season
November 9, 2023*; 7:00 pm, ESPN+		Drake	L 66–78	0–1	20 – McMakin	13 – Simon	3 – McMakin	Chaifetz Arena (602); St. Louis, MO
November 12, 2023*; 3:00 pm, ESPN+		Missouri	W 93–85	1–1	22 – 2 tied	7 – Simon	11 – Martinez	Chaifetz Arena (2,276); St. Louis, MO
November 15, 2023*; 7:00 pm, ESPN+		Missouri State	W 79–67	2–1	24 – Kennedy	10 – Shavers	6 – Martinez	Chaifetz Arena (923); St. Louis, MO
November 18, 2023*; 6:00 pm		vs. Chaminade; North Shore Showcase	W 109–63	3–1	19 – McMakin	10 – Simon	7 – 2 tied	Cannon Activities Center (157); Laie, HI
November 20, 2023*; 7:00 pm, ESPN+		vs. Wake Forest; North Shore Showcase	L 66–94	3–2	26 – McMakin	9 – Martinez	1 – 8 tied	Cannon Activities Center (76); Laie, HI
November 21, 2023*; 7:00 pm, ESPN+		vs. BYU; North Shore Showcase	L 66–87	3–3	16 – Kennedy	16 – Simon	5 – Calhoun	Cannon Activities Center (220); Laie, HI
November 26, 2023*; 2:00 pm, ESPN+		UIC	W 79–75	4–3	29 – Kennedy	6 – Shavers	5 – Calhoun	Chaifetz Arena (527); St. Louis, MO
December 1, 2023*; 6:00 pm, ESPN+		at Wichita State	L 59–78	4–4	11 – 3 tied	9 – Shavers	6 – Calhoun	Charles Koch Arena (1,155); Wichita, KS
December 3, 2023*; 2:00 pm, ESPN+		Ball State	L 64–71	4–5	22 – McMakin	11 – Kennedy	4 – McMakin	Chaifetz Arena (812); St. Louis, MO
December 6, 2023*; 7:00 pm, ESPN+		Southern Indiana	W 89–53	5–5	27 – McMakin	11 – Simon	7 – Martinez	Chaifetz Arena (416); St. Louis, MO
December 9, 2023*; 4:00 pm, ESPN+		at Southern Illinois	L 67–75	5–6	15 – 2 tied	6 – Kennedy	5 – Calhoun	Banterra Center (600); Carbondale, IL
December 16, 2023*; 4:00 pm, ESPN+		at Green Bay	L 54–87	5–7	11 – McMakin	5 – Simon	5 – Martinez	Kress Events Center (1,756); Green Bay, WI
December 19, 2023*; 6:30 pm, ESPN+		at Illinois State	L 81–87	5–8	23 – Kennedy	8 – Martinez	9 – Martinez	CEFCU Arena (1,281); Normal, IL
A-10 regular season
December 30, 2023; 7:00 pm, ESPN+		Rhode Island	L 58–63	5–9 (0–1)	14 – McMakin	7 – Martinez	5 – Martinez	Chaifetz Arena (1,247); St. Louis, MO
January 3, 2024; 6:00 pm, ESPN+		at Loyola Chicago	L 72–74	5–10 (0–2)	19 – Gray	14 – Simon	13 – Martinez	Joseph J. Gentile Arena (613); Chicago, IL
January 6, 2024; 12:00 pm, ESPN+		at UMass	W 79–75	6–10 (1–2)	27 – McMakin	9 – Kennedy	6 – Martinez	Mullins Center (955); Amherst, MA
January 9, 2024; 7:00 pm, ESPN+		Saint Joseph's	L 57–69	6–11 (1–3)	16 – McMakin	8 – Shavers	8 – Martinez	Chaifetz Arena (276); St. Louis, MO
January 12, 2024; 7:00 pm, ESPN+		Dayton	W 74–70	7–11 (2–3)	17 – McMakin	5 – 2 tied	3 – Martinez	Chaifetz Arena (2,118); St. Louis, MO
January 17, 2024; 6:00 pm, ESPN+		at George Mason	L 61–91	7–12 (2–4)	13 – Kennedy	7 – Martinez	8 – Martinez	EagleBank Arena (747); Fairfax, VA
January 20, 2024; 1:00 pm, ESPN+		at George Washington	W 66–56	8–12 (3–4)	12 – McMakin	8 – Simon	9 – Martinez	Charles E. Smith Center (342); Washington, D.C.
January 28, 2024; 2:00 pm, ESPN+		Richmond	L 61–72	8–13 (3–5)	20 – Kennedy	8 – 2 tied	6 – Martinez	Chaifetz Arena (1,112); St. Louis, MO
January 31, 2024; 6:00 pm, ESPN+		at Dayton	W 87–61	9–13 (4–5)	26 – McMakin	7 – 2 tied	5 – 2 tied	UD Arena (1,879); Dayton, OH
February 3, 2024; 12:00 pm, ESPN+		at Davidson	L 58–66	9–14 (4–6)	15 – Gray	7 – Martinez	7 – Martinez	John M. Belk Arena (733); Davidson, NC
February 7, 2024; 11:00 am, ESPN+		VCU	L 67–76	9–15 (4–7)	15 – McMakin	5 – 2 tied	3 – Martinez	Chaifetz Arena (7,459); St. Louis, MO
February 11, 2024; 11:00 am, ESPNU		at Rhode Island	W 76–73	10–15 (5–7)	31 – Kennedy	4 – 3 tied	6 – Martinez	Ryan Center (1,225); Kingston, RI
February 14, 2024; 7:00 pm, ESPN+		Loyola Chicago	W 77–68	11–15 (6–7)	22 – Gray	9 – Martinez	4 – 2 tied	Chaifetz Arena (776); St. Louis, MO
February 17, 2024; 7:00 pm, ESPN+		Duquesne	L 65–82	11–16 (6–8)	24 – McMakin	8 – Martinez	4 – Martinez	Chaifetz Arena (1,013); St. Louis, MO
February 21, 2024; 6:00 pm, ESPN+		at Fordham	L 64–79	11–17 (6–9)	24 – Kennedy	10 – Martinez	7 – Martinez	Rose Hill Gymnasium (321); The Bronx, NY
February 25, 2024; 2:00 pm, ESPN+		St. Bonaventure	W 83–61	12–17 (7–9)	30 – McMakin	8 – Kennedy	6 – 2 tied	Chaifetz Arena (825); St. Louis, MO
February 28, 2024; 5:30 pm, ESPN+		at La Salle	W 78–57	13–17 (8–9)	17 – Kennedy	12 – Simon	10 – Martinez	Tom Gola Arena (234); Philadelphia, PA
March 2, 2024; 7:00 pm, ESPN+		Davidson	W 2–0 Forfeit	13–17 (9–9)	–	–	–	Chaifetz Arena; St. Louis, MO
March 2, 2024*; 7:00 pm, ESPN+		Knox College	W 119–42	14–17	26 – Kennedy	15 – Kennedy	11 – Martinez	Chaifetz Arena (1,125); St. Louis, MO
A-10 tournament
March 7, 2024; 4:00 pm, ESPN+	(7)	vs. (10) George Washington; Second round	W 75–68	15–17	22 – McMakin	13 – Simon	4 – Martinez	Henrico Sports & Events Center; Henrico, VA
March 8, 2024; 4:00 pm, ESPN+	(7)	vs. (2) VCU; Quarterfinals	W 65–63	16–17	22 – Kennedy	7 – 2 tied	6 – Martinez	Henrico Sports & Events Center; Henrico, VA
March 9, 2024; 12:30 pm, CBSSN	(7)	vs. (6) Rhode Island; Semifinals	L 62–68	16–18	16 – Kennedy	7 – Kennedy	4 – Calhoun	Henrico Sports & Events Center (2,271); Henrico, VA
WNIT
March 21, 2024*; 6:30 pm, ESPN+		at Central Arkansas; First round	W 66–61	17–18	28 – Kennedy	8 – McMakin	11 – Martinez	Farris Center (625); Conway, AR
March 24, 2024*; 5:00 pm, ESPN+		Northern Iowa; Second round	W 68–64	18–18	19 – Kennedy	8 – 2 tied	4 – 3 tied	Chaifetz Arena (511); St. Louis, MO
March 29, 2024*; 6:00 pm, ESPN+		at Purdue Fort Wayne; Super 16	W 82–78	19–18	31 – Kennedy	11 – Simon	8 – Martinez	Hilliard Gates Sports Center (767); Fort Wayne, IN
April 1, 2024*; 7:00 pm		at Wisconsin; Great 8	W 65–60	20–18	18 – McMakin	8 – Simon	5 – Martinez	Kohl Center (2,198); Madison, WI
April 3, 2024*; 5:00 pm, ESPN+		at Vermont; Fab 4	W 57–54	21–18	23 – Kennedy	14 – Simon	4 – Martinez	Patrick Gym (1,694); Burlington, VT
April 6, 2024*; 2:00 pm, CBSSN		vs. Minnesota; Championship	W 69–50	22–18	20 – McMakin	10 – Martinez	6 – Martinez	First Community Arena (1,545); Edwardsville, IL
*Non-conference game. ^{#}Rankings from AP poll. (#) Tournament seedings in parentheses. All times are in Central.
