= 2024 Missouri Valley Conference women's basketball tournament =

American college basketball postseason tournament

- Classification: Division I
- Season: 2023–24
- Teams: 12
- Site: Vibrant Arena at The MARK; Moline, Illinois
- Champions: Drake (9th title)
- Winning coach: Allison Pohlman (2nd title)
- MVP: Katie Dinnebier (Drake)
- Television: MVC TV, ESPN2

2023–24 Missouri Valley Conference women's basketball standings
| | Conf. | | | | Overall |
| Team | W | | L | PCT | W | | L | PCT |
|---|---|---|---|---|---|---|---|---|
| Drake † | 19 | – | 1 | .950 | 29 | – | 6 | .829 |
| Belmont | 17 | – | 3 | .850 | 26 | – | 9 | .743 |
| Missouri State | 15 | – | 5 | .750 | 23 | – | 10 | .697 |
| Northern Iowa | 14 | – | 6 | .700 | 16 | – | 16 | .500 |
| Illinois State | 13 | – | 7 | .650 | 22 | – | 12 | .647 |
| Murray State | 12 | – | 8 | .600 | 20 | – | 12 | .625 |
| UIC | 10 | – | 10 | .500 | 18 | – | 16 | .529 |
| Southern Illinois | 6 | – | 14 | .300 | 11 | – | 20 | .355 |
| Indiana State | 6 | – | 14 | .300 | 11 | – | 21 | .344 |
| Valparaiso | 4 | – | 16 | .200 | 5 | – | 25 | .167 |
| Bradley | 2 | – | 18 | .100 | 6 | – | 26 | .188 |
| Evansville | 2 | – | 18 | .100 | 4 | – | 28 | .125 |
† 2024 MVC tournament winner

The 2024 Missouri Valley Conference Women's Basketball Tournament, popularly referred to as "Hoops in the Heartland", is a postseason women's basketball tournament that completed the 2023–24 season in the Missouri Valley Conference. The tournament was held at the Vibrant Arena at The MARK in Moline, Illinois from March 14-17, 2024.

== Seeds ==
Teams are seeded by conference record, with ties broken by the overall record in conference games played between the tied teams, then (if necessary) by comparison of records between the tying institutions versus the top team in the standings (and continuing from top to bottom of standings, as necessary, with the team having the better record against that team receiving the better seed). The top four seeds receive opening–round byes.

| Seed | School | Conference | Tiebreaker 1 |
|---|---|---|---|
| 1 | Drake | 19–1 | |
| 2 | Belmont | 17–3 | |
| 3 | Missouri State | 15–5 | |
| 4 | Northern Iowa | 14–6 | |
| 5 | Illinois State | 13–7 | |
| 6 | Murray State | 12–8 | |
| 7 | UIC | 10–10 | |
| 8 | Southern Illinois | 6–14 | 1–1 vs. UIC |
| 9 | Indiana State | 6–14 | 0–1 vs. UIC |
| 10 | Valparaiso | 4–16 | |
| 11 | Bradley | 2–18 | 1–0 vs. Evansville |
| 12 | Evansville | 2–18 | 0–1 vs. Bradley |

== Schedule ==
| Game | Time * | Matchup | Score | Television |
Opening Round – Thursday, March 14
| 1 | 12:00 pm | No. 8 Southern Illinois vs. No. 9 Indiana State | 54–66 | MVC TV |
| 2 | 2:30 pm | No. 5 Illinois State vs. No. 12 Evansville | 85–64 | MVC TV |
| 3 | 6:00 pm | No. 7 UIC vs. No. 10 Valparaiso | 79–77 | MVC TV |
| 4 | 8:30 pm | No. 6 Murray State vs. No. 11 Bradley | 87–49 | MVC TV |
Quarterfinals – Friday, March 15
| 5 | 12:00 pm | No. 1 Drake vs. No. 9 Indiana State | 79–57 | MVC TV |
| 6 | 2:30 pm | No. 4 Northern Iowa vs. No. 5 Illinois State | 79–75 | MVC TV |
| 7 | 6:00 pm | No. 2 Belmont vs. No. 7 UIC | 70–65 | MVC TV |
| 8 | 8:30 pm | No. 3 Missouri State vs. No. 6 Murray State | 71–70 | MVC TV |
Semifinals – Saturday, March 16
| 9 | 1:30 pm | No. 1 Drake vs. No. 4 Northern Iowa | 92–83^{OT} | MVC TV |
| 10 | 4:00 pm | No. 2 Belmont vs. No. 3 Missouri State | 48–63 | MVC TV |
Final – Sunday, March 17
| 11 | 1:00 pm | No. 1 Drake vs. No. 3 Missouri State | 76–75 | ESPN2 |
* Game times in CST; rankings denote tournament seed.

== Bracket ==
First Round; Thursday, March 14; MVC TV
8 | Southern Illinois | 54
9 | Indiana State | 66
5 | Illinois State | 85
12 | Evansville | 64
7 | UIC | 79
10 | Valparaiso | 77
6 | Murray State | 87
11 | Bradley | 49

Quarterfinals; Friday, March 15; MVC TV
1 | Drake | 79
9 | Indiana State | 57
4 | Northern Iowa | 79
5 | Illinois State | 75
2 | Belmont | 70
7 | UIC | 65
3 | Missouri State | 71
6 | Murray State | 70

Semifinals; Saturday, March 16; MVC TV
1 | Drake | 92*
4 | Northern Iowa | 83
2 | Belmont | 48
3 | Missouri State | 63

Final; Sunday, March 17; ESPN2
1 | Drake | 76
3 | Missouri State | 75
