= 2024 Women's National Invitation Tournament =

American collegiate basketball tournament

- Season: 2023–24
- Teams: 48
- Finals site: Vadalabene Center, Edwardsville, IL
- Champions: Saint Louis (1st title)
- Runner-up: Minnesota (1st title game)
- Semifinalists: Vermont (1st semifinal); Troy (1st semifinal)
- Winning coach: Rebecca Tillett (1st title)

The 2024 Women's National Invitation Tournament was a single-elimination tournament of 48 NCAA Division I women's college basketball teams that were not selected for the field of the 2024 Women's NCAA Tournament or the 2024 WBIT. The tournament committee announced the 48-team field on March 17, following the selection of the fields for the NCAA Tournament and WBIT.

== Participants ==
The 2024 field featured 11 automatic qualifiers and 37 teams at-large selections, chosen after consideration of a mix of criteria by WNIT officials. There were 24 teams with 20 or more victories in the bracket.

=== Automatic qualifiers ===
Conference	School
America East	Albany
ASUN	Stetson
Big Sky	Northern Arizona
Big South	USC Upstate
CAA	Monmouth
MAAC	Niagara
Northeast	Le Moyne
Ohio Valley	Southern Indiana
Patriot	Colgate
Southern	UNC Greensboro
SWAC	Grambling State

=== At-large bids ===
School	Conference
Boise State	MWC
Bowling Green	MAC
Buffalo	MAC
Butler	Big East
Cal Poly	Big West
Central Arkansas	ASUN
Charleston	CAA
Cincinnati	Big 12
Duquesne	A-10
Eastern Kentucky	ASUN
FIU	C-USA
Illinois State	MVC
Louisiana–Monroe	Sun Belt
Minnesota	Big Ten
Montana	Big Sky
Murray State	MVC
North Carolina A&T	CAA
North Dakota State	Summit
Northern Colorado	Big Sky
Northern Iowa	MVC
Old Dominion	Sun Belt
Oral Roberts	Summit
Pacific	WCC
Providence	Big East
Purdue	Big Ten
Purdue Fort Wayne	Horizon
Saint Louis	A-10
South Dakota	Summit
Southern Miss	Sun Belt
Troy	Sun Belt
UAB	American
UC Riverside	Big West
UIC	MVC
UTSA	American
Vermont	AmEast
Wisconsin	Big Ten
Wyoming	MWC

== Bracket ==
* – Denotes overtime period
(H) - Denotes home team
Teams with a bye are not guaranteed to play at home in the second round

Round 1 March 20–22
(H)	Pacific	63
Cal Poly	43
(H)	Montana	92
Boise State	66
(H)	UTSA	80
Northern Colorado	62
(H)	South Dakota	72
UC Riverside	57

Round 2 March 23–26
(H)	Minnesota	77
Pacific	62
(H)	North Dakota State	72
Montana	63
(H)	Wyoming	80
UTSA	64
Northern Arizona	65
(H)	South Dakota	79

Super 16; March 27–29
(H)	Minnesota	69
North Dakota State	65
(H)	Wyoming	84
South Dakota	52

Great 8 April 1
Minnesota	65
(H)	Wyoming	54

Round 1 March 20–22
(H)	FIU	60
Stetson	47
(H)	North Carolina A&T	56
UNC Greensboro	51
(H)	Southern Miss	79
UAB	74
(H)	Oral Roberts	91
Grambling State	93

Round 2 March 23–26
(H)	Troy	92
FIU	62
Old Dominion	45
(H)	North Carolina A&T	48
Murray State	67
(H)	Southern Miss	78*
(H)	Louisiana–Monroe	102
Grambling State	76

Super 16; March 27–29
Troy	89
(H)	North Carolina A&T	75
Southern Miss	71
(H)	Louisiana–Monroe	84

Great 8 April 1
(H)	Troy	89
Louisiana–Monroe	75

Round 1 March 20–22
(H)	Colgate	64
Albany	50
(H)	Niagara	91
Le Moyne	86
(H)	Buffalo	53
Monmouth	68
(H)	Butler	75
Bowling Green	63

Round 2 March 23–26
(H)	Providence	41
Colgate	54
(H)	Vermont	69
Niagara	63
(H)	Duquesne	69*
Monmouth	65
Purdue	62
(H)	Butler	51

Super 16; March 27–29
Colgate	55
(H)	Vermont	65
Duquesne	50
(H)	Purdue	71

Great 8 April 1
Vermont	67
(H)	Purdue	59

Round 1 March 20–22
(H)	Purdue Fort Wayne	83
Eastern Kentucky	75
(H)	Central Arkansas	61
Saint Louis	66
(H)	USC Upstate	60
Charleston	78
(H)	Southern Indiana	69
UIC	64

Round 2 March 23–26
(H)	Cincinnati	58
Purdue Fort Wayne	85
Northern Iowa	64
(H)	Saint Louis	68
(H)	Illinois State	74
Charleston	67
Wisconsin	67
(H)	Southern Indiana	62

Super 16; March 27–29
(H)	Purdue Fort Wayne	78
Saint Louis	82
Illinois State	61
(H)	Wisconsin	86

Great 8 April 1
Saint Louis	65
(H)	Wisconsin	60

=== Semifinals and Championship Game ===
Semifinals; Fab 4 April 3
Saint Louis	57
(H)	Vermont	54
Minnesota	74
(H)	Troy	69

Championship; April 7 CBSSN
Minnesota	50
(H)	Saint Louis^	69

^ Despite Saint Louis being designated as the home team, game played at the Vadalabene Center on the campus of Southern Illinois University Edwardsville (SIUE) in Edwardsville, Illinois (within the Greater St. Louis area).

== See also ==
- 2024 National Invitation Tournament
