= 2023 Missouri Valley Conference women's basketball tournament =

- Classification: Division I
- Season: 2022–23
- Teams: 12
- Site: Vibrant Arena at The MARK; Moline, Illinois
- Champions: Drake Bulldogs (8th title)
- Winning coach: Allison Pohlman (1st title)
- MVP: Maggie Bair (Drake)
- Television: MVC TV, ESPNU

2022–23 Missouri Valley Conference women's basketball standings
	Conf.				Overall
Team	W		L	PCT	W		L	PCT
Illinois State	17	–	3	.850	24	–	9	.727
Belmont	17	–	3	.850	23	–	12	.657
Northern Iowa	16	–	4	.800	23	–	10	.697
Missouri State	14	–	6	.700	20	–	12	.625
Drake†	14	–	6	.700	22	–	9	.710
UIC	9	–	11	.450	19	–	17	.528
Southern Illinois	8	–	12	.400	12	–	19	.387
Murray State	7	–	13	.350	15	–	16	.484
Evansville	6	–	14	.300	11	–	19	.367
Indiana State	6	–	14	.300	11	–	19	.367
Valparaiso	5	–	15	.250	7	–	23	.233
Bradley	1	–	19	.050	4	–	28	.125
† 2023 MVC tournament winner As of March 19, 2023

The 2023 Missouri Valley Conference Women's Basketball Tournament, marketed as "Hoops in the Heartland", was a postseason women's basketball tournament that completed the 2022–23 season in the Missouri Valley Conference (MVC). The tournament was held at the Vibrant Arena at The MARK in Moline, Illinois, from March 9–12, 2023. Drake won the tournament, claiming the MVC's automatic bid to the NCAA tournament.

For the first time, the tournament featured 12 teams. Belmont, Murray State, and UIC joined the conference in 2022 following Loyola Chicago's exit.

== Seeds ==
Teams are seeded by conference record, with ties broken by the overall record in conference games played between the tied teams, then (if necessary) by comparison of records between the tying institutions versus the top team in the standings (and continuing from top to bottom of standings, as necessary, with the team having the better record against that team receiving the better seed). The top four seeds receive opening-round byes.

Seed	School	Conference	Tiebreaker 1
1	Illinois State	17-3	1-0 vs. Belmont
2	Belmont	17-3	0-1 vs. Illinois State
3	Northern Iowa	16-4	
4	Drake	14-6	1-1 vs. Belmont
5	Missouri State	14-6	0-2 vs. Belmont
6	UIC	9-11	
7	Southern Illinois	8-12	
8	Murray State	7-13	
9	Evansville	6-14	2-0 vs. Indiana State
10	Indiana State	6-14	0-2 vs. Evansville
11	Valparaiso	5-15	
12	Bradley	1-19	

== Schedule ==
Game	Time *	Matchup	Score	Television
Opening Round – Thursday, March 9
1	12:00 pm	No. 8 Murray State vs. No. 9 Evansville	88–46	MVC TV
2	2:30 pm	No. 5 Missouri State vs. No. 12 Bradley	71–53	MVC TV
3	6:00 pm	No. 7 Southern Illinois vs. No. 10 Indiana State	81–79	MVC TV
4	8:30 pm	No. 6 UIC vs. No. 11 Valparaiso	72–47	MVC TV
Quarterfinals – Friday, March 10
5	12:00 pm	No. 1 Illinois State vs. No. 8 Murray State	75–73	MVC TV
6	2:30 pm	No. 4 Drake vs. No. 5 Missouri State	73–70	MVC TV
7	6:00 pm	No. 2 Belmont vs. No. 7 Southern Illinois	70–64	MVC TV
8	8:30 pm	No. 3 Northern Iowa vs. No. 6 UIC	73–57	MVC TV
Semifinals – Saturday, March 11
9	1:30 pm	No. 1 Illinois State vs. No. 4 Drake	54–74	MVC Network
10	4:00 pm	No. 2 Belmont vs. No. 3 Northern Iowa	69–62	MVC Network
Final – Sunday, March 12
11	1:00 pm	No. 2 Belmont vs. No. 4 Drake	71–89	ESPNU
*Game times in CST. Rankings denote tournament seed.

== Bracket ==
Opening Round; Thursday, March 9 MVC TV
8	Murray State	88
9	Evansville	46
5	Missouri State	71
12	Bradley	53
7	Southern Illinois	81
10	Indiana State	79
6	UIC	72
11	Valparaiso	47

Quarterfinals; Friday, March 10; MVC TV
1	Illinois State	75
8	Murray State	73
4	Drake	73
5	Missouri State	70
2	Belmont	70
7	Southern Illinois	64
3	Northern Iowa	73
6	UIC	57

Semifinals; Saturday, March 11; MVC Network
1	Illinois State	54
4	Drake	74
2	Belmont	69
3	Northern Iowa	62

Final; Sunday, March 12; ESPNU
4	Drake	89
2	Belmont	71
