= Davidson Wildcats basketball =

Davidson Wildcats basketball may refer to either of the basketball teams that represent Davidson College:

- Davidson Wildcats men's basketball
- Davidson Wildcats women's basketball
