= 2023–24 St. Bonaventure Bonnies women's basketball team =

American college basketball season

2023–24 St. Bonaventure Bonnies women's basketball
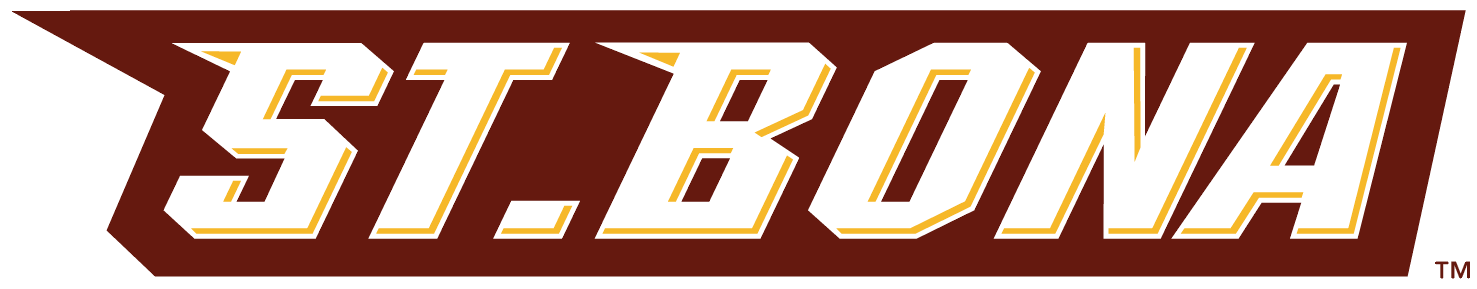
- Conference: Atlantic 10 Conference
- Record: 4–26 (1–17 A–10)
- Head coach: Jim Crowley (1st season, 17th overall season)
- Associate head coach: Tiara Johnson
- Assistant coaches: Kelcie Rombach; Jim Brunelli
- Home arena: Reilly Center

2023–24 Atlantic 10 women's basketball standings
	Conf.				Overall
Team	W		L	PCT	W		L	PCT
Richmond †	16	–	2	.889	29	–	6	.829
VCU	15	–	3	.833	26	–	6	.813
Saint Joseph's	15	–	3	.833	28	–	6	.824
George Mason	14	–	4	.778	23	–	8	.742
Duquesne	13	–	5	.722	21	–	13	.618
Rhode Island	10	–	8	.556	21	–	14	.600
Saint Louis	9	–	9	.500	22	–	18	.550
Davidson*	8	–	10	.444	18	–	8	.692
Loyola Chicago	8	–	10	.444	15	–	16	.484
Fordham	8	–	10	.444	12	–	17	.414
George Washington	6	–	12	.333	13	–	18	.419
Dayton	5	–	13	.278	12	–	19	.387
La Salle	5	–	13	.278	8	–	22	.267
UMass	2	–	16	.111	5	–	27	.156
St. Bonaventure	1	–	17	.056	4	–	26	.133
† 2024 A10 tournament winner * Season cancelled on March 1, 2024.

The 2023–24 St. Bonaventure Bonnies women's basketball team represented St. Bonaventure University during the 2023–24 NCAA Division I women's basketball season. The Bonnies, led by head coach Jim Crowley in the first season of his second stint (17th overall), played their home games at the Reilly Center in St. Bonaventure, New York as members of the Atlantic 10 Conference.

== Previous season ==
The Bonnies finished the 2022–23 season 6–26, 3–13 in AAC play to finish in 14th place. As the #14 seed in the A–10 tournament, they were defeated by #11 seed Davidson in the first round.

On January 15, 2023, St. Bonaventure announced that they would be firing head coach Jesse Fleming, who was in the middle of his seventh season as head coach, with assistant coach Erica Morrow being named interim head coach for the remainder of the season. On March 10, Providence and former Bonnies head coach Jim Crowley was announced as the team's next head coach, after previously serving the role for the school from 2000 to 2016.

== Roster ==
2023–24 St. Bonaventure Bonnies women's basketball team
Players
Coaches

Pos.	#	Name	Height	Year	Previous school	Hometown
G	2	Nadechka Laccen	5 ft 6 in (1.68 m)	Sr	Tyler Junior College	San Juan, Puerto Rico
G	10	Tianna Johnson	5 ft 10 in (1.78 m)	Sr	New Mexico Junior College	Peoria, Illinois
G	11	Kirah Dandridge	5 ft 10 in (1.78 m)	So	New Hope Academy	Richmond, Virginia
F	12	Taylor Napper	6 ft 0 in (1.83 m)	Jr	St. John's College High School	Lorton, Virginia
G/F	13	Maddie Dziezgowski	5 ft 10 in (1.78 m)	Sr	Bethel Park High School	Bethel Park, Pennsylvania
G	14	Isabellah Middleton	5 ft 9 in (1.75 m)	RS Jr	Slippery Rock	Leesburg, Virginia
G	20	Tamar voor de Poort	6 ft 0 in (1.83 m)	So	Lekdetec.nl	Doetinchem, Netherlands
G	22	Dani Haskell	5 ft 6 in (1.68 m)	Sr	Canisius	Franklinville, New York
G	24	Payton Fields	6 ft 0 in (1.83 m)	Sr	Western Nebraska Community College	El Paso, Texas
F	33	Claire Cody	5 ft 11 in (1.8 m)	RS Sr	Carmel High School	Carmel, New York

Head coach

- Jim Crowley (Keuka)

Assistant coach(es)

- Tiara Johnson (St. Bonaventure)
- Kelcie Rombach (St. Bonaventure)
- Jim Brunelli (Clarion)

Legend

- (C) Team captain
- (S) Suspended
- (I) Ineligible
- (W) Walk-on
- Injured
- Current redshirt

Roster
Last update: December 23, 2023

== Schedule and results ==
Date time, TV	Rank^{#}	Opponent^{#}	Result	Record	High points	High rebounds	High assists	Site (attendance) city, state
Exhibition
November 4, 2023*; 1:30 pm		D'Youville	W 62–48	–	18 – Napper	9 – Middleton	2 – 3 Tied	Reilly Center (225); St. Bonaventure, NY
Non-conference regular season
November 8, 2023*; 6:00 pm, ESPN+		at Niagara	L 51–75	0–1	10 – Laccen	9 – Laccen	4 – Dziezgowski	Gallagher Center (588); Lewiston, NY
November 11, 2023*; 1:30 pm, ESPN+		Robert Morris	W 70–52	1–1	23 – Haskell	8 – Middleton	4 – 3 Tied	Reilly Center (4,500); St. Bonaventure, NY
November 16, 2023*; 7:00 pm, ESPN+		Albany	L 56–66	1–2	13 – Johnson	7 – Haskell	3 – Cody	Reilly Center (130); St. Bonaventure, NY
November 18, 2023*; 1:00 pm, ESPN+		at Binghamton	L 65–73	1–3	16 – 2 Tied	6 – 3 Tied	2 – Dandridge	Binghamton University Events Center; Vestal, NY
November 22, 2023*; 1:00 pm, ESPN+		at Buffalo	L 69–78	1–4	22 – Haskell	4 – 3 Tied	5 – Johnson	Alumni Arena (1,286); Amherst, NY
November 25, 2023*; 2:00 pm, ESPN+		at Loyola (MD)	W 55–51	2–4	17 – Laccen	7 – Laccen	4 – Dandridge	Reitz Arena (230); Baltimore, MD
November 30, 2023*; 7:00 pm, ESPN+		Canisius	L 56–63	2–5	20 – Middleton	10 – Dandridge	4 – Dandridge	Reilly Center (321); St. Bonaventure, NY
December 2, 2023*; 12:00 pm, ESPN+		at West Virginia	L 50–90	2–6	11 – Haskell	6 – Laccen	3 – 2 Tied	WVU Coliseum (1,535); Morgantown, WV
December 5, 2023*; 7:00 pm, ESPN+		at Cornell	L 53–55	2–7	16 – Laccen	7 – Laccen	5 – Dandridge	Newman Arena (112); Ithaca, NY
December 16, 2023*; 1:00 pm, ESPN+		Youngstown State	W 55–47	3–7	11 – Cody	8 – Middleton	3 – 2 Tied	Reilly Center (225); St. Bonaventure, NY
December 21, 2023*; 1:00 pm, ESPN+		at Colgate	L 45–58	3–8	15 – Haskell	5 – Dandridge	3 – Fields	Cotterell Court (226); Hamilton, NY
A-10 regular season
December 30, 2023; 1:00 pm, ESPN+		Loyola Chicago	W 84–72	4–8 (1–0)	27 – Haskell	12 – Middleton	4 – 2 Tied	Reilly Center (485); St. Bonaventure, NY
January 3, 2024; 11:00 am, ESPN+		at Fordham	L 57–65	4–9 (1–1)	13 – Laccen	7 – Dandridge	3 – 2 Tied	Rose Hill Gymnasium (2,800); Bronx, NY
January 6, 2024; 1:00 pm, ESPN+		at Rhode Island	L 41–65	4–10 (1–2)	12 – Middleton	8 – Middleton	4 – Haskell	Ryan Center (1,200); Kingston, RI
January 10, 2024; 7:00 pm, ESPN+		La Salle	L 71–75	4–11 (1–3)	16 – Haskell	8 – Laccen	7 – Laccen	Reilly Center (155); St. Bonaventure, NY
January 14, 2024; 1:00 pm, ESPN+		George Washington	L 62–78	4–12 (1–4)	15 – Laccen	8 – Dandridge	5 – Laccen	Reilly Center (115); St. Bonaventure, NY
January 17, 2024; 6:00 pm, ESPN+		at Duquesne	L 67–76	4–13 (1–5)	15 – Middleton	9 – Middleton	4 – Dandridge	UPMC Cooper Fieldhouse (1,007); Pittsburgh, PA
January 20, 2024; 2:00 pm, ESPN+		at Loyola Chicago	L 50–78	4–14 (1–6)	13 – 2 Tied	9 – Dandridge	5 – Dandridge	Joseph J. Gentile Arena (384); Chicago, IL
January 24, 2024; 7:00 pm, ESPN+		Saint Joseph's	L 40–65	4–15 (1–7)	10 – Middleton	5 – Laccen	3 – Middleton	Reilly Center (193); St. Bonaventure, NY
January 28, 2024; 12:00 pm, CBSSN		at Dayton	L 43–64	4–16 (1–8)	13 – 2 Tied	6 – Fields	2 – Laccen	UD Arena (2,503); Dayton, OH
January 31, 2024; 7:00 pm, ESPN+		Davidson	L 57–65	4–17 (1–9)	21 – Haskell	7 – Middleton	2 – Haskell	Reilly Center (194); St. Bonaventure, NY
February 7, 2024; 6:00 pm, ESPN+		at George Washington	L 48–69	4–18 (1–10)	21 – Middleton	9 – Fields	3 – Dandridge	Charles E. Smith Center (328); Washington, D.C.
February 10, 2024; 1:00 pm, ESPN+		at VCU	L 40–54	4–19 (1–11)	17 – Haskell	5 – 2 Tied	1 – 5 Tied	Siegel Center (432); Richmond, VA
February 14, 2024; 7:00 pm, ESPN+		Duquesne	L 50–66	4–20 (1–12)	12 – Laccen	6 – Fields	3 – 2 Tied	Reilly Center (112); St. Bonaventure, NY
February 18, 2024; 1:00 pm, ESPN+		Fordham	L 48–70	4–21 (1–13)	15 – 2 Tied	10 – Middleton	2 – Fields	Reilly Center (364); St. Bonaventure, NY
February 21, 2024; 7:00 pm, ESPN+		George Mason	L 53–57	4–22 (1–14)	13 – Middleton	8 – Middleton	2 – Cody	Reilly Center (243); St. Bonaventure, NY
February 25, 2024; 3:00 pm, ESPN+		at Saint Louis	L 61–83	4–23 (1–15)	24 – Middleton	5 – 2 Tied	6 – Dandridge	Chaifetz Arena (825); St. Louis, MO
February 28, 2024; 6:00 pm, ESPN+		at UMass	L 45–58	4–24 (1–16)	16 – Middleton	8 – Middleton	2 – 2 Tied	Mullins Center (1,220); Amherst, MA
March 2, 2024; 1:00 pm, ESPN+		Richmond	L 46–61	4–25 (1–17)	20 – Middleton	7 – Laccen	2 – 2 Tied	Reilly Center (225); St. Bonaventure, NY
A-10 tournament
March 6, 2024; 2:30 pm, ESPN+	(14)	vs. (11) Dayton; First Round	L 52–66	4–26	15 – Middleton	8 – Middleton	3 – Johnson	Henrico Sports & Events Center (1,044); Henrico, VA
*Non-conference game. ^{#}Rankings from AP Poll. (#) Tournament seedings in parentheses. All times are in Eastern.
