= 2023–24 Davidson Wildcats women's basketball team =

American college basketball season

2023–24 Davidson Wildcats women's basketball
- Conference: Atlantic 10 Conference
- Record: 18–8 (8–10 A-10)
- Head coach: Gayle Coats Fulks (7th season)
- Associate head coach: James Janssen
- Assistant coaches: Jasmine Jenkins; Laura Barry; Ryan Bauder
- Home arena: John M. Belk Arena

2023–24 Atlantic 10 women's basketball standings
	Conf.				Overall
Team	W		L	PCT	W		L	PCT
Richmond †	16	–	2	.889	29	–	6	.829
VCU	15	–	3	.833	26	–	6	.813
Saint Joseph's	15	–	3	.833	28	–	6	.824
George Mason	14	–	4	.778	23	–	8	.742
Duquesne	13	–	5	.722	21	–	13	.618
Rhode Island	10	–	8	.556	21	–	14	.600
Saint Louis	9	–	9	.500	22	–	18	.550
Davidson*	8	–	10	.444	18	–	8	.692
Loyola Chicago	8	–	10	.444	15	–	16	.484
Fordham	8	–	10	.444	12	–	17	.414
George Washington	6	–	12	.333	13	–	18	.419
Dayton	5	–	13	.278	12	–	19	.387
La Salle	5	–	13	.278	8	–	22	.267
UMass	2	–	16	.111	5	–	27	.156
St. Bonaventure	1	–	17	.056	4	–	26	.133
† 2024 A10 tournament winner * Season cancelled on March 1, 2024.

The 2023–24 Davidson Wildcats women's basketball team represented Davidson College during the 2023–24 NCAA Division I women's basketball season. The Wildcats, led by seventh-year head coach Gayle Coats Fulks, played their home games at the John M. Belk Arena in Davidson, North Carolina as members of the Atlantic 10 Conference (A-10). They finished the season 18–8, 8–10 in A-10 play, to finish in a three-way tie for eighth place. The Wildcats season was canceled on March 1, due to injuries.

== Previous season ==
The Wildcats finished the 2022–23 season 14–16, 6–8 in A-10 play, to finish in eleventh place. As the #11 seed in the A-10 tournament, they defeated #14 seed St. Bonaventure in the first round, before falling to #6 seed Saint Joseph's in the second round.

== Roster ==
2023–24 Davidson Wildcats women's basketball team
Players
Coaches

Pos.	#	Name	Height	Year	Previous school	Hometown
G	0	Suzi-Rose Deegan	5 ft 10 in (1.78 m)	Sr	Lake Ginninderra College	Perth, Australia
G	1	Mallorie Haines	5 ft 10 in (1.78 m)	Jr	Davidson Day School	Sherrills Ford, NC
G	3	Katie Donovan	5 ft 11 in (1.8 m)	Fr	Southport State High School	Queensland, Australia
G	4	Issy Morgan	5 ft 10 in (1.78 m)	Jr	Monte Sant'Angelo Mercy College	Sydney, Australia
G	9	Chloe Oliver	5 ft 8 in (1.73 m)	Fr	Champlain College Saint-Lambert	Quebec, Canada
F	10	Millie Prior	6 ft 2 in (1.88 m)	Jr	Lake Ginninderra College	Sydney, Australia
F	11	Tomisin Adenupe	6 ft 1 in (1.85 m)	Jr	George Walton High School	Marietta, GA
G	14	Maddie Plank	5 ft 11 in (1.8 m)	RS Jr	Briarcliff High School	Briarcliff Manor, NY
F	15	Eliza Buerk	6 ft 3 in (1.91 m)	Fr	Clackamas High School	Portland, OR
G	21	Charlise Dunn	6 ft 2 in (1.88 m)	So	Lake Ginninderra College	Victoria Point, Australia
G	22	Sylvie Jackson	6 ft 0 in (1.83 m)	Fr	Louisa County High School	Zion Crossroads, VA
G/F	30	Sallie Schutz	6 ft 2 in (1.88 m)	RS Jr	Westminster Christian Academy	Watkinsville, GA
F	33	Elle Sutphin	6 ft 3 in (1.91 m)	RS Sr	East Surry High School	Pilot Mountain, NC

Head coach

- Gayle Coats Fulks (Fairleigh Dickinson)

Assistant coach(es)

- James Janssen (Deakin)
- Jasmine Jenkins (Vanderbilt)
- Laura Barry (North Carolina)
- Ryan Bauder (Wake Forest)

Legend

- (C) Team captain
- (S) Suspended
- (I) Ineligible
- (W) Walk-on
- Injured
- Current redshirt

Roster
Last update: December 18, 2023

== Schedule and results ==
Date time, TV	Rank^{#}	Opponent^{#}	Result	Record	High points	High rebounds	High assists	Site (attendance) city, state
Regular season
November 6, 2023*; 7:00 p.m., ESPN+		USC Upstate	W 86–51	1–0	17 – Dunn	9 – Plank	4 – Deegan	John M. Belk Arena (264); Davidson, NC
November 11, 2023*; 1:00 p.m., ESPN+		Wake Forest	W 57–52	2–0	18 – Sutphin	9 – Dunn	3 – 3 tied	John M. Belk Arena (933); Davidson, NC
November 12, 2023*; 6:00 p.m., ACCN		at No. 16 North Carolina	L 70–74	2–1	21 – Dunn	8 – 2 tied	4 – 2 tied	Carmichael Arena (2,336); Chapel Hill, NC
November 16, 2023*; 7:00 p.m., ACCNX		at Duke	W 69–62	3–1	19 – Sutphin	6 – Dunn	3 – Prior	Cameron Indoor Stadium (1,083); Durham, NC
November 18, 2023*; 2:00 p.m.		at Morgan State	W 62–48	4–1	17 – Morgan	8 – Prior	3 – 2 tied	Talmadge L. Hill Field House (89); Baltimore, MD
November 21, 2023*; 11:00 a.m., ESPN+		Wofford	W 81–51	5–1	17 – Deegan	10 – Prior	5 – Prior	John M. Belk Arena (2,761); Davidson, NC
November 29, 2023*; 7:00 p.m., ESPN+		Appalachian State	W 64–41	6–1	21 – Deegan	13 – Prior	7 – Morgan	John M. Belk Arena (378); Davidson, NC
December 2, 2023*; 5:30 p.m., ESPN+		Longwood	W 83–46	7–1	22 – Haines	19 – Prior	7 – Morgan	John M. Belk Arena (2,783); Davidson, NC
December 5, 2023; 7:00 p.m., ESPN+		Dayton	W 81–53	8–1 (1–0)	22 – Deegan	6 – 2 tied	5 – Morgan	John M. Belk Arena (711); Davidson, NC
December 8, 2023*; 7:00 p.m., ESPN+		High Point	W 77–40	9–1	22 – Deegan	7 – Deegan	4 – Morgan	John M. Belk Arena (362); Davidson, NC
December 18, 2023*; 7:00 p.m., ESPN+		UNC Wilmington	W 75–56	10–1	19 – Haines	9 – Prior	7 – Dunn	John M. Belk Arena (873); Davidson, NC
December 21, 2023*; 2:00 p.m., ESPN+		at Charlotte	W 83–56	11–1	17 – Plank	8 – Dunn	4 – 2 tied	Dale F. Halton Arena (1,046); Charlotte, NC
January 2, 2024; 6:30 p.m., ESPN+		at La Salle	W 69–50	12–1 (2–0)	14 – Prior	9 – Prior	7 – Morgan	Tom Gola Arena; Philadelphia, PA
January 7, 2024; 2:00 p.m., CBSSN		VCU	L 55–65	12–2 (2–1)	17 – Deegan	8 – Prior	3 – Deegan	John M. Belk Arena (1,205); Davidson, NC
January 10, 2024; 7:00 p.m., ESPN+		at George Mason	L 41–79	12–3 (2–2)	12 – Prior	6 – Prior	2 – Morgan	EagleBank Arena (740); Fairfax, VA
January 14, 2024; 2:00 p.m., CBSSN		at Fordham	W 66–48	13–3 (3–2)	20 – Dunn	10 – Sutphin	4 – Morgan	Rose Hill Gymnasium (678); The Bronx, NY
January 17, 2024; 7:00 p.m., ESPN+		Richmond	L 54–59	13–4 (3–3)	15 – Sutphin	12 – Prior	3 – 2 tied	John M. Belk Arena (712); Davidson, NC
January 21, 2024; 2:00 p.m., CBSSN		Duquesne	L 59–66	13–5 (3–4)	20 – Sutphin	7 – 2 tied	3 – Prior	John M. Belk Arena (803); Davidson, NC
January 24, 2024; 7:00 p.m., ESPN+		UMass	W 72–42	14–5 (4–4)	15 – Haines	11 – Dunn	5 – Plank	John M. Belk Arena (713); Davidson, NC
January 27, 2024; 2:00 p.m., ESPN+		at Saint Joseph's	L 42–68	14–6 (4–5)	16 – Dunn	8 – Prior	2 – 2 tied	Hagan Arena (917); Philadelphia, PA
January 31, 2024; 7:00 p.m., ESPN+		at St. Bonaventure	W 65–57	15–6 (5–5)	22 – Dunn	8 – Prior	3 – Dunn	Reilly Center (194); St. Bonaventure, NY
February 3, 2024; 1:00 p.m., ESPN+		Saint Louis	W 66–58	16–6 (6–5)	27 – Dunn	10 – 2 tied	3 – Morgan	John M. Belk Arena (733); Davidson, NC
February 11, 2024; 3:00 p.m., ESPN+		at Loyola Chicago	W 48–45	17–6 (7–5)	12 – Plank	6 – 2 tied	4 – Morgan	Joseph J. Gentile Arena (819); Chicago, IL
February 14, 2024; 1:00 p.m., ESPN+		George Mason	W 75–67	18–6 (8–5)	24 – Sutphin	7 – 2 tied	6 – Plank	John M. Belk Arena (521); Davidson, NC
February 17, 2024; 1:00 p.m., ESPN+		at Rhode Island	L 49–61	18–7 (8–6)	16 – Donovan	11 – Prior	2 – 4 tied	Ryan Center (1,319); Kingston, RI
February 21, 2024; 7:00 p.m., ESPN+		at Dayton	L 0–2 Forfeit	18–7 (8–7)	–	–	–	UD Arena; Dayton, OH
February 24, 2024; 12:00 p.m., ESPN+		Fordham	L 0–2 Forfeit	18–7 (8–8)	–	–	–	John M. Belk Arena; Davidson, NC
February 28, 2024; 7:00 p.m., ESPN+		George Washington	L 40–45	18–8 (8–9)	12 – Plank	9 – Donovan	3 – Morgan	John M. Belk Arena (767); Davidson, NC
March 2, 2024; 8:00 p.m., ESPN+		at Saint Louis	L 0–2 Forfeit	18–8 (8–10)	–	–	–	Chaifetz Arena; St. Louis, MO
*Non-conference game. ^{#}Rankings from AP poll. (#) Tournament seedings in parentheses. All times are in Eastern.
