= 2023–24 La Salle Explorers women's basketball team =

American college basketball season

2023–24 La Salle Explorers women's basketball
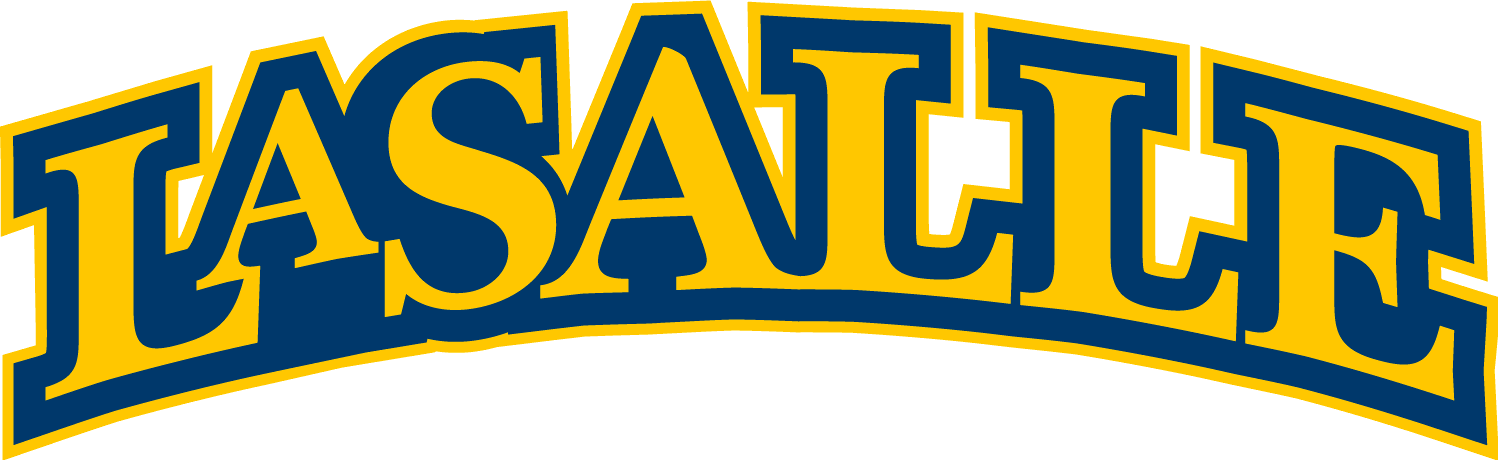
- Conference: Atlantic 10 Conference
- Record: 8–22 (5–13 A–10)
- Head coach: Mountain MacGillivray (6th season)
- Associate head coach: Chris Day
- Assistant coaches: Gillian Abshire; Jeryn Reese
- Home arena: Tom Gola Arena

2023–24 Atlantic 10 women's basketball standings
	Conf.				Overall
Team	W		L	PCT	W		L	PCT
Richmond †	16	–	2	.889	29	–	6	.829
VCU	15	–	3	.833	26	–	6	.813
Saint Joseph's	15	–	3	.833	28	–	6	.824
George Mason	14	–	4	.778	23	–	8	.742
Duquesne	13	–	5	.722	21	–	13	.618
Rhode Island	10	–	8	.556	21	–	14	.600
Saint Louis	9	–	9	.500	22	–	18	.550
Davidson*	8	–	10	.444	18	–	8	.692
Loyola Chicago	8	–	10	.444	15	–	16	.484
Fordham	8	–	10	.444	12	–	17	.414
George Washington	6	–	12	.333	13	–	18	.419
Dayton	5	–	13	.278	12	–	19	.387
La Salle	5	–	13	.278	8	–	22	.267
UMass	2	–	16	.111	5	–	27	.156
St. Bonaventure	1	–	17	.056	4	–	26	.133
† 2024 A10 tournament winner * Season cancelled on March 1, 2024.

The 2023–24 La Salle Explorers women's basketball team represented La Salle University during the 2023–24 NCAA Division I women's basketball season. The Explorers, led by sixth-year head coach Mountain MacGillivray, played their home games at Tom Gola Arena in Philadelphia, Pennsylvania as members of the Atlantic 10 Conference.

== Previous season ==
The Explorers finished the 2022–23 season 17–14, 8–7 in A–10 play to finish in eighth place. They were defeated by George Mason in the second round of the A–10 tournament.

== Roster ==
2023–24 La Salle Explorers women's basketball team
Players
Coaches

Pos.	#	Name	Height	Year	Previous school	Hometown
G	1	Tiara Bolden	5 ft 11 in (1.8 m)	Jr	Eastern Arizona College	Eugene, Oregon
F	3	Emilee Tahata	6 ft 0 in (1.83 m)	Jr	Woodcrest State College	Springfield, Australia
G	4	Fiona Connolly	5 ft 8 in (1.73 m)	So	Brewster Academy	South Burlington, Vermont
C	5	Amber Bullard	6 ft 2 in (1.88 m)	Fr	The Christian Academy	Philadelphia, Pennsylvania
G	10	Nicole Melious	5 ft 8 in (1.73 m)	Fr	Susan E. Wagner High School	Staten Island, New York
G	11	Emma Egan	5 ft 8 in (1.73 m)	So	Bullitt East High School	Mount Washington, Kentucky
G	12	Molly Masciantonio	5 ft 10 in (1.78 m)	GS	Holy Family	Morton, Pennsylvania
G	13	Makayla Miller	5 ft 7 in (1.7 m)	GS	Ouachita Baptist	Little Rock, Arkansas
G	20	Laia Monclova	6 ft 1 in (1.85 m)	Fr	Valencia Basket	Mallorca, Spain
F	24	Ashley Hopper	5 ft 10 in (1.78 m)	Sr	Abington Senior High School	Rockledge, Pennsylvania
G	25	Julie Jekot	5 ft 11 in (1.8 m)	Jr	Cumberland Valley High School	Enola, Pennsylvania
G	30	Aryss Macktoon	5 ft 10 in (1.78 m)	Fr	St. Timothy's School	Catonsville, Maryland
G	31	Gabby Turco	5 ft 10 in (1.78 m)	Jr	Saint Anselm	Wildwood, New Jersey
G	32	Jolene Armendariz	6 ft 0 in (1.83 m)	GS	San Francisco State	Canyon Lake, California
C	33	Hailey Chiles	6 ft 3 in (1.91 m)	Fr	Greenwood High School	Greenwood, South Carolina

Head coach

- Mountain MacGillivray (Temple)

Assistant coach(es)

- Chris Day (West Chester)
- Gillian Abshire (Quinnipiac)
- Jeryn Reese (La Salle)

Legend

- (C) Team captain
- (S) Suspended
- (I) Ineligible
- (W) Walk-on
- Injured
- Current redshirt

Roster
Last update: December 21, 2023

== Schedule and results ==
Date time, TV	Rank^{#}	Opponent^{#}	Result	Record	High points	High rebounds	High assists	Site (attendance) city, state
Non-conference regular season
November 6, 2023*; 7:00 pm		at Coppin State	W 73–68	1–0	17 – Macktoon	10 – Armendariz	4 – 2 Tied	Physical Education Complex (541); Baltimore, MD
November 9, 2023*; 4:30 pm, ESPN+		Maine	L 48–58	1–1	13 – Macktoon	4 – 2 Tied	2 – 2 Tied	Tom Gola Arena (247); Philadelphia, PA
November 11, 2023*; 12:00 pm, ESPN+		American	W 62–53	2–1	22 – Melious	10 – Turco	3 – 2 Tied	Tom Gola Arena (778); Philadelphia, PA
November 15, 2023*; 6:00 pm, FloSports		at Drexel; Big 5	L 46–71	2–2	10 – Melious	6 – Macktoon	2 – 2 Tied	Daskalakis Athletic Center (529); Philadelphia, PA
November 21, 2023*; 7:00 pm, ESPN+		at Rider	W 72–44	3–2	16 – Turco	11 – Armendariz	5 – Masciantonio	Alumni Gymnasium (516); Lawrenceville, NJ
November 29, 2023*; 6:00 pm, ESPN+		at Penn; Big 5	L 71–79	3–3	23 – Miller	7 – Armendariz	6 – Masciantonio	The Palestra (573); Philadelphia, PA
December 3, 2023*; 1:00 pm, ESPN+		Virginia	L 73–94	3–4	15 – Miller	7 – Miller	4 – Masciantonio	Tom Gola Arena (387); Philadelphia, PA
December 5, 2023*; 7:00 pm, B1G+		at Rutgers	L 67–98	3–5	12 – 2 Tied	10 – Armendariz	6 – Miller	Jersey Mike's Arena (1,216); Piscataway, NJ
December 7, 2023*; 7:00 pm, ESPN+		at Lehigh	L 60–106	3–6	16 – Melious	8 – Bolden	4 – Masciantonio	Stabler Arena (703); Bethlehem, PA
December 17, 2023*; 1:00 pm, ESPN+		Temple; Big 5	L 61–85	3–7	12 – Masciantonio	6 – 2 Tied	3 – Masciantonio	Tom Gola Arena (412); Philadelphia, PA
December 21, 2023*; 12:00 pm, ESPN+		Villanova; Big 5	L 60–74	3–8	15 – Masciantonio	4 – 2 Tied	4 – Miller	Tom Gola Arena (612); Philadelphia, PA
A-10 regular season
December 30, 2023; 6:00 pm, ESPN+		at George Mason	L 37–74	3–9 (0–1)	8 – Melious	9 – Armendariz	1 – 2 Tied	EagleBank Arena (5,100); Fairfax, VA
January 2, 2024; 6:30 pm, ESPN+		Davidson	L 50–69	3–10 (0–2)	17 – Masciantonio	5 – 2 Tied	3 – Melious	Tom Gola Arena; Philadelphia, PA
January 6, 2024; 2:00 pm, ESPN+		Fordham	W 64–53	4–10 (1–2)	19 – Masciantonio	8 – Bolden	6 – Masciantonio	Tom Gola Arena (323); Philadelphia, PA
January 10, 2024; 7:00 pm, ESPN+		at St. Bonaventure	W 75–71	5–10 (2–2)	19 – Miller	7 – Armendariz	4 – Masciantonio	Reilly Center (155); St. Bonaventure, NY
January 13, 2024; 3:00 pm, ESPN+		UMass	W 70–64	6–10 (3–2)	17 – Turco	7 – 2 Tied	6 – Miller	Tom Gola Arena (1,647); Philadelphia, PA
January 15, 2024; 12:00 pm, CBSSN		at Saint Joseph's	L 39–64	6–11 (3–3)	14 – Miller	4 – 2 Tied	3 – Miller	Hagan Arena (715); Philadelphia, PA
January 20, 2024; 1:00 pm, ESPN+		at VCU	L 50–66	6–12 (3–4)	16 – Miller	7 – Armendariz	4 – Masciantonio	Siegel Center (1,126); Richmond, VA
January 24, 2024; 11:00 am, ESPN+		Rhode Island	L 47–75	6–13 (3–5)	15 – Melious	6 – Armendariz	3 – Masciantonio	Tom Gola Arena (1,202); Philadelphia, PA
January 31, 2024; 3:00 pm, ESPN+		at UMass	W 63–61	7–13 (4–5)	16 – Armendariz	8 – Miller	8 – Miller	Mullins Center (3,069); Amherst, MA
February 4, 2024; 2:00 pm, ESPN+		Dayton	L 69–72 ^{OT}	7–14 (4–6)	18 – Masciantonio	7 – Miller	4 – 2 Tied	Tom Gola Arena (382); Philadelphia, PA
February 8, 2024; 6:30 pm, ESPN+		Loyola Chicago	L 39–73	7–15 (4–7)	14 – Melious	4 – 2 Tied	4 – Miller	Tom Gola Arena (156); Philadelphia, PA
February 10, 2024; 2:00 pm, ESPN+		at Duquesne	L 52–57	7–16 (4–8)	15 – Armendariz	10 – Armendariz	7 – Masciantonio	UPMC Cooper Fieldhouse (988); Pittsburgh, PA
February 14, 2024; 6:00 pm, ESPN+		at George Washington	L 49–71	7–17 (4–9)	16 – Miller	6 – Masciantonio	3 – Masciantonio	Charles E. Smith Center (224); Washington, D.C.
February 18, 2024; 2:00 pm, ESPN+		Saint Joseph's	L 29–60	7–18 (4–10)	13 – Miller	6 – Armendariz	1 – 4 Tied	Tom Gola Arena (418); Philadelphia, PA
February 21, 2024; 6:00 pm, ESPN+		at Richmond	L 54–74	7–19 (4–11)	12 – Melious	8 – Melious	7 – Masciantonio	Robins Center (832); Richmond, VA
February 24, 2024; 2:00 pm, ESPN+		VCU	L 50–75	7–20 (4–12)	12 – Masciantonio	6 – Egan	4 – Masciantonio	Tom Gola Arena (436); Philadelphia, PA
February 28, 2024; 6:30 pm, ESPN+		Saint Louis	L 57–78	7–21 (4–13)	13 – Bolden	8 – 2 Tied	5 – Masciantonio	Tom Gola Arena (234); Philadelphia, PA
March 2, 2024; 1:00 pm, ESPN+		at Fordham	W 93–83	8–21 (5–13)	28 – Melious	8 – Bolden	7 – Miller	Rose Hill Gymnasium (422); Bronx, NY
A-10 tournament
March 6, 2024; 12:00 pm, ESPN+	(12)	vs. (13) UMass; First Round	L 49–54	8–22	17 – Melious	8 – Miller	3 – 2 Tied	Henrico Sports & Events Center; Henrico, VA
*Non-conference game. ^{#}Rankings from AP Poll. (#) Tournament seedings in parentheses. All times are in Eastern.
