= Gayle Fulks =

American basketball coach

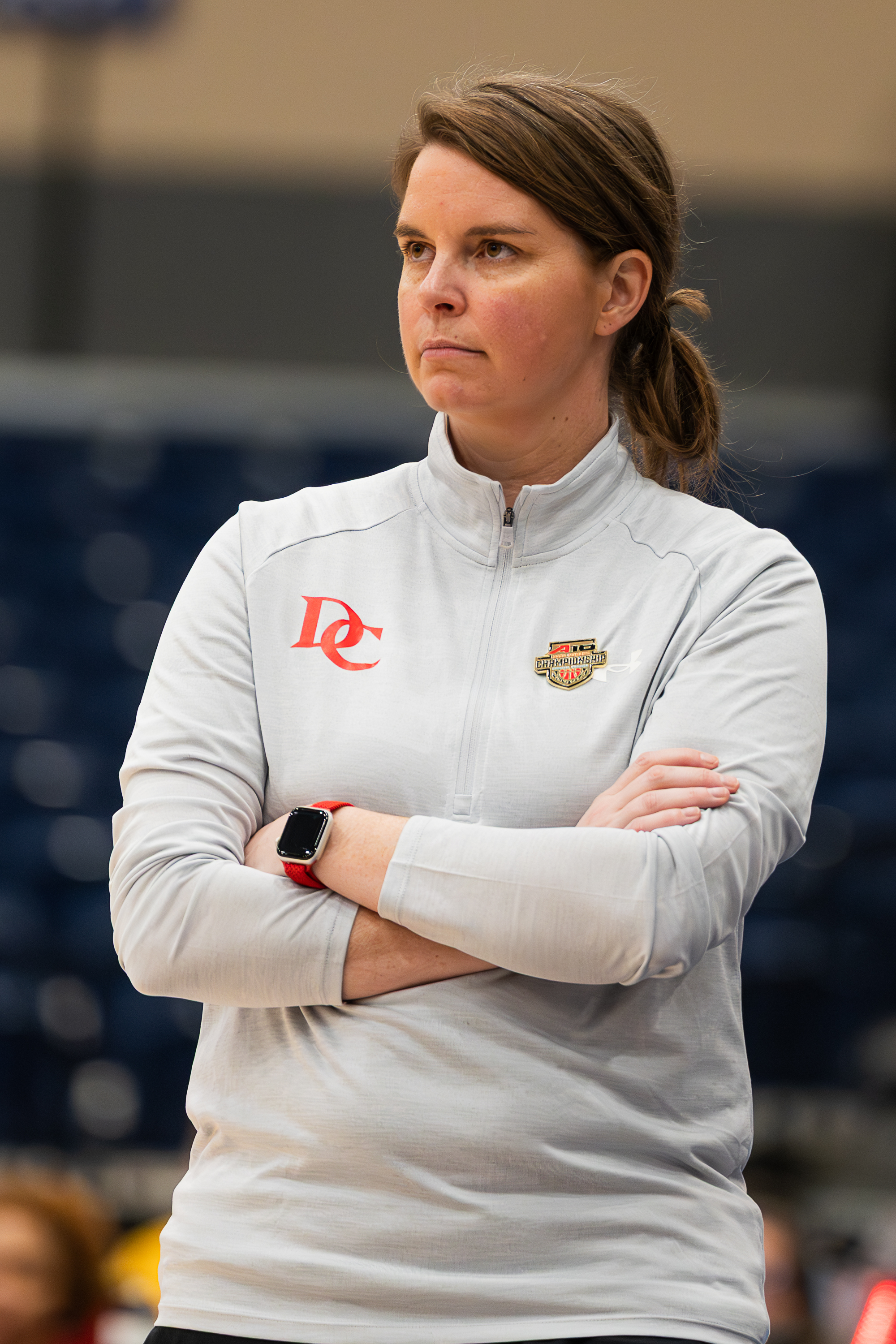
- Fulks with Davidson at the 2026 A10 Championship Tournament

Current position
- Title: Head coach
- Team: Davidson
- Conference: Atlantic 10
- Record: 143–128 (.528)

Biographical details
- Born: April 6, 1985 (age 41); Virginia Beach, Virginia, U.S.

Playing career
- 2003–2007: Farleigh Dickinson

Coaching career (HC unless noted)
- 2007–2011: Longwood (assistant)
- 2011–2012: UNC Greensboro (assistant)
- 2012–2016: Wake Forest (assistant)
- 2017–present: Davidson

Head coaching record
- Overall: 143–128 (.528)

Gayle Coats Fulks (née Coats; born April 6, 1985) is an American women's basketball coach with the Davidson Wildcats.

== Career ==
She played collegiately with the Fairleigh Dickinson Knights. In May 2017, Fulks left Wake Forest to be named the 12th women's basketball head coach in Davidson history.

In her first season with the Wildcats, the team finished 12–18 overall and 7–9 in conference.

== Fairleigh Dickinson statistics ==
Legend
GP	Games played	GS	Games started	MPG	Minutes per game
FG%	Field goal percentage	3P%	3-point field goal percentage	FT%	Free throw percentage
RPG	Rebounds per game	APG	Assists per game	SPG	Steals per game
BPG	Blocks per game	PPG	Points per game	**Bold**	Career high

Year	Team	GP	Points	FG%	3P%	FT%	RPG	APG	SPG	BPG	PPG
2003–04	Fairleigh Dickinson	25	18	25.0%	16.7%	63.6%	0.8	0.6	0.3	0.1	0.7
2004–05	Fairleigh Dickinson	17	29	**30.3%**	16.7%	63.6%	1.4	1.7	0.8	0.2	1.7
2005–06	Fairleigh Dickinson	**28**	51	25.5%	21.1%	65.5%	1.4	1.2	1.0	0.2	1.8
2006–07	Fairleigh Dickinson	22	**121**	26.8%	**28.6%**	**66.1%**	**2.1**	**3.2**	**1.8**	**0.2**	**5.5**
Career		92	219	26.8%	24.7%	65.5%	1.4	1.6	0.9	0.2	2.4

== Head coaching record ==
Record table
Season	Team	Overall	Conference	Standing	Postseason
**Davidson** (Atlantic 10 Conference) (2017–present)
2017–18	Davidson	12–18	7–9	9th	
2018–19	Davidson	17–15	10–6	T–4th	WBI First round
2019–20	Davidson	16–15	8–8	T–7th	
2020–21	Davidson	8–15	5–10	13th	
2021–22	Davidson	18–15	6–10	T–9th	WBI Fifth Place
2022–23	Davidson	14–16	6–8	11th	
2023–24	Davidson	18–8	8–10	T–8th	
2024–25	Davidson	19–14	13–5	3rd	WBIT First Round
2025–26	Davidson	21–12	12–6	4th	
Davidson:		143–128 (.528)	75–72 (.510)		
Total:		143–128 (.528)			
National champion Postseason invitational champion Conference regular season champion Conference regular season and conference tournament champion Division regular season champion Division regular season and conference tournament champion Conference tournament champion
