= 2023–24 Loyola Ramblers women's basketball team =

American college basketball season

2023–24 Loyola Ramblers women's basketball
- Conference: Atlantic 10 Conference
- Record: 15–16 (8–10 A-10)
- Head coach: Allison Guth (2nd season)
- Assistant coaches: Marsha Frese; Jordan McCann; Simon Harris; Jenna Rubino-McCormick; Chanise Jenkins
- Home arena: Joseph J. Gentile Arena

2023–24 Atlantic 10 women's basketball standings
	Conf.				Overall
Team	W		L	PCT	W		L	PCT
Richmond †	16	–	2	.889	29	–	6	.829
VCU	15	–	3	.833	26	–	6	.813
Saint Joseph's	15	–	3	.833	28	–	6	.824
George Mason	14	–	4	.778	23	–	8	.742
Duquesne	13	–	5	.722	21	–	13	.618
Rhode Island	10	–	8	.556	21	–	14	.600
Saint Louis	9	–	9	.500	22	–	18	.550
Davidson*	8	–	10	.444	18	–	8	.692
Loyola Chicago	8	–	10	.444	15	–	16	.484
Fordham	8	–	10	.444	12	–	17	.414
George Washington	6	–	12	.333	13	–	18	.419
Dayton	5	–	13	.278	12	–	19	.387
La Salle	5	–	13	.278	8	–	22	.267
UMass	2	–	16	.111	5	–	27	.156
St. Bonaventure	1	–	17	.056	4	–	26	.133
† 2024 A10 tournament winner * Season cancelled on March 1, 2024.

The 2023–24 Loyola Ramblers women's basketball team represented Loyola University Chicago during the 2023–24 NCAA Division I women's basketball season. The Ramblers, led by second-year head coach Allison Guth, played their home games at the Joseph J. Gentile Arena in Chicago, Illinois as members of the Atlantic 10 Conference (A-10).

The Ramblers finished the season 15–16, 8–10 in A-10 play, to finish in a three-way tie for eighth place. They defeated Fordham, before falling to top-seeded and eventual tournament champions Richmond in the quarterfinals of the A-10 tournament.

== Previous season ==
The Ramblers finished the 2022–23 season 6–24, 1–15 in A-10 play, to finish in last place. As the #15 seed in the A-10 tournament, they were defeated by #10 seed Duquesne in the first round.

== Roster ==
2023–24 Loyola Ramblers women's basketball team
Players
Coaches

Pos.	#	Name	Height	Year	Previous school	Hometown
F	1	Aaliyah Moore	6 ft 0 in (1.83 m)	Sr	St. Francis Brooklyn	Milwaukee, WI
G	3	Alyssa Fisher	5 ft 7 in (1.7 m)	GS	St. Francis Brooklyn	Baton Rouge, LA
G	4	Audrey Deptula	6 ft 0 in (1.83 m)	Fr	Middleton High School	Verona, WI
G	5	Thoranna Kika Hodge-Carr	5 ft 8 in (1.73 m)	Sr	Iona	Keflavík, Iceland
G/F	10	Ali Berg	6 ft 1 in (1.85 m)	GS	IUPUI	Bourbonnais, IL
G	12	Sam Galanopoulos	5 ft 8 in (1.73 m)	GS	Niles West High School	Skokie, IL
G	13	Kira Chivers	5 ft 3 in (1.6 m)	So	Marist	Chicago, IL
F	14	Sophia Nolan	6 ft 1 in (1.85 m)	GS	St. John's	Valparaiso, IN
F	15	Sitori Tanin	6 ft 2 in (1.88 m)	Sr	Middleton High School	Middleton, WI
G	25	Mallory Ramage	5 ft 10 in (1.78 m)	So	Mattoon High School	Mattoon, IL
F	30	Destiny Jackson	5 ft 10 in (1.78 m)	Jr	Snider High School	Fort Wayne, IN
G	34	Maddie Petroelje	6 ft 1 in (1.85 m)	Fr	Hudsonville High School	Hudsonville, MI
F	41	Emma Nolan	6 ft 1 in (1.85 m)	GS	St. John's	Valparaiso, IN

Head coach

- Allison Guth (Illinois)

Assistant coach(es)

- Marsha Frese (Rice)
- Jordan McCann (Illinois)
- Simon Harris (NC State)
- Jenna Rubino-McCormick (DePaul)
- Chanise Jenkins (DePaul)

Legend

- (C) Team captain
- (S) Suspended
- (I) Ineligible
- (W) Walk-on
- Injured
- Current redshirt

Roster
Last update: December 19, 2023

== Schedule and results ==
Date time, TV	Rank^{#}	Opponent^{#}	Result	Record	High points	High rebounds	High assists	Site (attendance) city, state
Exhibition
October 29, 2023*; 1:00 p.m.		Roosevelt	W 71–49	—	12 – E. Nolan	6 – S. Nolan	5 – Galanopoulos	Joseph J. Gentile Arena (529); Chicago, IL
Non-conference regular season
November 6, 2023*; 6:00 p.m., ESPN+		UIC	L 51–67	0–1	14 – Fisher	7 – E. Nolan	3 – 3 tied	Joseph J. Gentile Arena (508); Chicago, IL
November 9, 2023*; 4:00 p.m., ESPN+		at Chicago State	W 74–47	1–1	15 – Galanopoulos	5 – 2 tied	5 – Fisher	Jones Convocation Center (165); Chicago, IL
November 12, 2023*; 2:00 p.m., ESPN+		Cleveland State	L 66–74	1–2	20 – Fisher	6 – Tanin	9 – Galanopoulos	Joseph J. Gentile Arena (406); Chicago, IL
November 16, 2023*; 6:00 p.m., ESPN+		at Bradley	W 67–62 ^{OT}	2–2	27 – Galanopoulos	14 – Tanin	4 – Fisher	Renaissance Coliseum (435); Peoria, IL
November 22, 2023*; 1:00 p.m., ESPN+		Brown	L 49–56	2–3	13 – Galanopoulos	11 – Tanin	4 – 2 tied	Joseph J. Gentile Arena (201); Chicago, IL
November 26, 2023*; 2:00 p.m., FloSports		at DePaul	L 72–93	2–4	20 – Galanopoulos	4 – Berg	4 – Galanopoulos	Wintrust Arena (1,469); Chicago, IL
November 29, 2023*; 11:00 a.m., B1G+		at Northwestern	W 73–68	3–4	20 – Galanopoulos	6 – Berg	9 – Galanopoulos	Welsh–Ryan Arena (1,018); Evanston, IL
December 2, 2023*; 12:00 p.m., ESPN+		Eastern Illinois	W 58–44	4–4	16 – Fisher	9 – Tanin	5 – 2 tied	Joseph J. Gentile Arena (615); Chicago, IL
December 9, 2023*; 2:00 p.m., ESPN+		Milwaukee	W 60–47	5–4	16 – Tanin	6 – Berg	6 – Galanopoulos	Joseph J. Gentile Arena (328); Chicago, IL
December 18, 2023*; 11:00 a.m., NBCSCHI/ESPN+		SIU Edwardsville	W 77–74	6–4	26 – Fisher	11 – Tanin	8 – Galanopoulos	Joseph J. Gentile Arena (3,747); Chicago, IL
December 21, 2023*; 5:00 p.m., B1G+		at No. 4 Iowa	L 69–98	6–5	15 – E. Nolan	5 – S. Nolan	4 – Galanopoulos	Carver–Hawkeye Arena (14,998); Iowa City, IA
A-10 regular season
December 30, 2023; 12:00 p.m., ESPN+		at St. Bonaventure	L 72–84	6–6 (0–1)	22 – Galanopoulos	5 – Galanopoulos	3 – 2 tied	Reilly Center (485); St. Bonaventure, NY
January 3, 2024; 6:00 p.m., ESPN+		Saint Louis	W 74–72	7–6 (1–1)	28 – Fisher	4 – 2 tied	6 – Galanopoulos	Joseph J. Gentile Arena (613); Chicago, IL
January 6, 2024; 11:00 a.m., ESPN+		at Dayton	L 64–69	7–7 (1–2)	13 – Tanin	4 – 2 tied	4 – 2 tied	UD Arena (1,810); Dayton, OH
January 10, 2024; 6:00 p.m., ESPN+		Rhode Island	W 61–56	8–7 (2–2)	18 – E. Nolan	7 – 2 tied	3 – Tanin	Joseph J. Gentile Arena (306); Chicago, IL
January 13, 2024; 1:00 p.m., ESPN+		VCU	L 36–52	8–8 (2–3)	8 – Chivers	8 – Hodge-Carr	2 – 2 tied	Joseph J. Gentile Arena (325); Chicago, IL
January 17, 2024; 5:00 p.m., ESPN+		at UMass	W 79–66	9–8 (3–3)	22 – Galanopoulos	7 – 2 tied	6 – Tanin	Mullins Center (835); Amherst, MA
January 20, 2024; 1:00 p.m., ESPN+		St. Bonaventure	W 78–50	10–8 (4–3)	24 – Fisher	5 – Tanin	4 – Tanin	Joseph J. Gentile Arena (384); Chicago, IL
January 24, 2024; 6:00 p.m., ESPN+		at Fordham	W 73–64	11–8 (5–3)	20 – Galanopoulos	9 – Tanin	6 – Fisher	Rose Hill Gymnasium (351); The Bronx, NY
January 28, 2024; 1:00 p.m., ESPN+		at Duquesne	L 57–73	11–9 (5–4)	14 – Galanopoulos	10 – 2 tied	6 – Tanin	UPMC Cooper Fieldhouse (1,232); Pittsburgh, PA
January 31, 2024; 6:00 p.m., ESPN+		Saint Joseph's	L 50–61	11–10 (5–5)	19 – Fisher	10 – Tanin	6 – Galanopoulos	Joseph J. Gentile Arena (579); Chicago, IL
February 3, 2024; 2:00 p.m., ESPN+		George Mason	L 52–61	11–11 (5–6)	12 – Galanopoulos	9 – Berg	7 – Galanopoulos	Joseph J. Gentile Arena (492); Chicago, IL
February 8, 2024; 5:30 p.m., ESPN+		at La Salle	W 73–39	12–11 (6–6)	19 – Tanin	10 – Tanin	4 – Galanopoulos	Tom Gola Arena (156); Philadelphia, PA
February 11, 2024; 2:00 p.m., NBCSCHI/ESPN+		Davidson	L 45–48	12–12 (6–7)	18 – Galanopoulos	7 – Tanin	3 – Galanopoulos	Joseph J. Gentile Arena (819); Chicago, IL
February 14, 2024; 7:00 p.m., ESPN+		at Saint Louis	L 68–77	12–13 (6–8)	23 – Fisher	11 – Tanin	6 – Galanopoulos	Chaifetz Arena (776); St. Louis, MO
February 17, 2024; 5:00 p.m., ESPN+		at Richmond	L 71–75	12–14 (6–9)	21 – Galanopoulos	7 – E. Nolan	8 – Chivers	Robins Center (1,570); Richmond, VA
February 21, 2024; 6:00 p.m., NBC Sports App		UMass	W 64–52	13–14 (7–9)	18 – Tanin	7 – Tanin	5 – Tanin	Joseph J. Gentile Arena (522); Chicago, IL
February 25, 2024; 2:00 p.m., ESPN+		Dayton	W 64–61	14–14 (8–9)	16 – Galanopoulos	5 – Tanin	6 – Chivers	Joseph J. Gentile Arena (813); Chicago, IL
March 2, 2024; 1:00 p.m., ESPN+		at George Washington	L 43–50	14–15 (8–10)	13 – Fisher	7 – Tanin	3 – Galanopoulos	Charles E. Smith Center (475); Washington, D.C.
A-10 tournament
March 7, 2024; 10:00 a.m., ESPN+	(8)	vs. (9) Fordham; Second round	W 53–52	15–15	14 – Fisher	10 – Berg	5 – Galanopoulos	Henrico Sports & Events Center; Henrico, VA
March 8, 2024; 10:00 a.m., ESPN+	(8)	vs. (1) Richmond; Quarterfinals	L 54–70	15–16	22 – Galanopoulos	6 – Tanin	3 – Chivers	Henrico Sports & Events Center; Henrico, VA
*Non-conference game. ^{#}Rankings from AP poll. (#) Tournament seedings in parentheses. All times are in Central.
