= 2023–24 Fordham Rams women's basketball team =

American college basketball season

2023–24 Fordham Rams women's basketball
- Conference: Atlantic 10 Conference
- Record: 12–17 (8–10 A-10)
- Head coach: Bridgette Mitchell (1st season)
- Assistant coaches: Ross James; Courtney Davidson; Keturah Jackson
- Home arena: Rose Hill Gymnasium

2023–24 Atlantic 10 women's basketball standings
	Conf.				Overall
Team	W		L	PCT	W		L	PCT
Richmond †	16	–	2	.889	29	–	6	.829
VCU	15	–	3	.833	26	–	6	.813
Saint Joseph's	15	–	3	.833	28	–	6	.824
George Mason	14	–	4	.778	23	–	8	.742
Duquesne	13	–	5	.722	21	–	13	.618
Rhode Island	10	–	8	.556	21	–	14	.600
Saint Louis	9	–	9	.500	22	–	18	.550
Davidson*	8	–	10	.444	18	–	8	.692
Loyola Chicago	8	–	10	.444	15	–	16	.484
Fordham	8	–	10	.444	12	–	17	.414
George Washington	6	–	12	.333	13	–	18	.419
Dayton	5	–	13	.278	12	–	19	.387
La Salle	5	–	13	.278	8	–	22	.267
UMass	2	–	16	.111	5	–	27	.156
St. Bonaventure	1	–	17	.056	4	–	26	.133
† 2024 A10 tournament winner * Season cancelled on March 1, 2024.

The 2023–24 Fordham Rams women's basketball team represented Fordham University during the 2023–24 NCAA Division I women's basketball season. The Rams, led by first-year head coach Bridgette Mitchell, played their home games at Rose Hill Gymnasium in the Bronx, New York as a member of the Atlantic 10 Conference (A-10).

The Rams finished the season 12–17, 8–10 in A-10 play, to finish in a three-way tie for eighth place. They were defeated by Loyola Chicago in the second round of the A-10 tournament.

== Previous season ==
The Rams finished the 2022–23 season 19–13, 10–6 in A-10 play, to finish in a tie for third place. As the #4 seed in the A-10 tournament, they were defeated by #5 seed Richmond in the quarterfinals. They received an at-large bid into the WNIT, where they defeated Drexel in the first round, before falling to Columbia in the second round.

After being led by interim head coach Candice Green for the entirety of the 2022–23 season, the school announced on April 7, that Northeastern head coach Bridgette Mitchell would be the team's next head coach.

== Roster ==
2023–24 Fordham Rams women's basketball team
Players
Coaches

Pos.	#	Name	Height	Year	Previous school	Hometown
G	0	Miya Giles-Jones	6 ft 0 in (1.83 m)	Fr	Terry Sanford High School	Fayetteville, NC
G	1	Matilda Flood	5 ft 9 in (1.75 m)	Sr	MacKillop College	Bathurst, Australia
G	3	Taylor Donaldson	5 ft 10 in (1.78 m)	Sr	New Mexico State	Newbury Park, CA
G	4	Taya Davis	5 ft 7 in (1.7 m)	Jr	Garden City Community College	Decatur, IL
G	8	Emy Hayford	5 ft 8 in (1.73 m)	GS	Pittsburgh	Maastricht, Netherlands
F	10	Rose Nelson	6 ft 1 in (1.85 m)	So	St Paul's Grammar School	Wallacia, Australia
G	11	Mandy McGurk	5 ft 6 in (1.68 m)	GS	Penn	West Chester, PA
G	14	Cassidy Mahaney	5 ft 8 in (1.73 m)	Fr	Urbana High School	Frederick, MD
C	24	Aminata Ly	6 ft 4 in (1.93 m)	RS Sr	Cleveland State	Dakar, Senegal
F	25	Kaila Berry	5 ft 11 in (1.8 m)	So	St. John's Prep	Brooklyn, NY
F	30	Maranda Nyborg	6 ft 3 in (1.91 m)	Sr	Bethel High School	Bethel, CT
F/C	34	Kailah Harris	6 ft 1 in (1.85 m)	GS	Seton Hall	Ossining, NY

Head coach

- Bridgette Mitchell (Duke)

Assistant coach(es)

- Ross James (Millsaps)
- Courtney Davidson (Michigan State)
- Keturah Jackson (Duke)

Legend

- (C) Team captain
- (S) Suspended
- (I) Ineligible
- (W) Walk-on
- Injured
- Current redshirt

Roster
Last update: December 25, 2023

== Schedule and results ==
Date time, TV	Rank^{#}	Opponent^{#}	Result	Record	High points	High rebounds	High assists	Site (attendance) city, state
Regular season
November 6, 2023*; 5:30 p.m., ESPN+		Adelphi	W 70–43	1–0	18 – Hayford	10 – Ly	3 – Hayford	Rose Hill Gymnasium; The Bronx, NY
November 10, 2023*; 7:00 p.m., ESPN+		Albany	W 66–63	2–0	22 – Hayford	7 – Flood	7 – Davis	Rose Hill Gymnasium (347); The Bronx, NY
November 12, 2023*; 2:00 p.m., ACCNX		at Miami (FL)	L 39–78	2–1	13 – Donaldson	5 – 3 tied	2 – Hayford	Watsco Center (2,515); Coral Gables, FL
November 16, 2023*; 7:00 p.m., SNY/ESPN+		Manhattan; Battle of the Bronx	L 44–58	2–2	10 – 2 tied	12 – Ly	3 – Davis	Rose Hill Gymnasium; The Bronx, NY
November 20, 2023*; 7:00 p.m., YES/ESPN+		Georgian Court	W 85–44	3–2	15 – McGurk	9 – 2 tied	7 – Davis	Rose Hill Gymnasium (127); The Bronx, NY
November 25, 2023*; 1:00 p.m., SNY/ESPN+		UMass Lowell	W 76–49	4–2	14 – McGurk	6 – Flood	5 – Davis	Rose Hill Gymnasium (134); The Bronx, NY
November 28, 2023*; 7:00 p.m., ESPN+		Saint Peter's	W 80–46	5–2	35 – Donaldson	9 – Donaldson	5 – Davis	Rose Hill Gymnasium (187); The Bronx, NY
December 2, 2023*; 2:00 p.m., YES/ESPN+		Maine	L 62–74	5–3	21 – Donaldson	7 – Davis	4 – Hayford	Rose Hill Gymnasium (264); The Bronx, NY
December 5, 2023; 6:00 p.m., ESPN+		at Duquesne	L 73–75 ^{OT}	5–4 (0–1)	25 – Donaldson	8 – Donaldson	4 – Hayford	UPMC Cooper Fieldhouse (815); Pittsburgh, PA
December 7, 2023*; 7:00 p.m., ESPN+		at Siena	L 62–65	5–5	22 – Hayford	9 – Flood	4 – Flood	UHY Center (658); Loudonville, NY
December 10, 2023*; 2:00 p.m., ESPN+		at Fairfield	L 74–77	5–6	25 – Donaldson	8 – Nyborg	4 – Hayford	Leo D. Mahoney Arena (645); Fairfield, CT
December 21, 2023*; 6:00 p.m., ACCNX		at Virginia	L 56–82	5–7	14 – 2 tied	6 – Flood	5 – Nyborg	John Paul Jones Arena (4,208); Charlottesville, VA
December 30, 2023; 4:00 p.m., SNY/ESPN+		Saint Joseph's	L 49–76	5–8 (0–2)	15 – McGurk	6 – Flood	3 – Davis	Rose Hill Gymnasium (1,969); The Bronx, NY
January 3, 2024; 11:00 a.m., SNY/ESPN+		St. Bonaventure	W 65–57	6–8 (1–2)	24 – Donaldson	6 – 2 tied	4 – McGurk	Rose Hill Gymnasium (2,800); The Bronx, NY
January 6, 2024; 2:00 p.m., ESPN+		at La Salle	L 53–64	6–9 (1–3)	12 – Hayford	10 – Nelson	5 – Davis	Tom Gola Arena (323); Philadelphia, PA
January 10, 2024; 6:00 p.m., ESPN+		at VCU	L 54–57	6–10 (1–4)	27 – Donaldson	5 – Harris	3 – Hayford	Siegel Center (587); Richmond, VA
January 14, 2024; 2:00 p.m., CBSSN		Davidson	L 48–66	6–11 (1–5)	10 – 2 tied	7 – Harris	4 – Davis	Rose Hill Gymnasium (678); The Bronx, NY
January 17, 2024; 6:00 p.m., ESPN+		at Rhode Island	L 44–55	6–12 (1–6)	23 – Hayford	9 – Nelson	2 – 3 tied	Ryan Center (1,013); Kingston, RI
January 24, 2024; 7:00 p.m., YES/ESPN+		Loyola Chicago	L 64–73	6–13 (1–7)	22 – Donaldson	6 – Ly	4 – Davis	Rose Hill Gymnasium (351); The Bronx, NY
January 27, 2024; 2:00 p.m., YES/ESPN+		George Washington	W 60–55	7–13 (2–7)	18 – Hayford	9 – Harris	2 – 3 tied	Rose Hill Gymnasium (288); The Bronx, NY
January 31, 2024; 7:00 p.m., ESPN+		at George Mason	L 47–54	7–14 (2–8)	24 – Donaldson	8 – Flood	3 – MuGurk	EagleBank Arena (743); Fairfax, VA
February 3, 2024; 6:00 p.m., ESPN+		at Richmond	L 60–79	7–15 (2–9)	23 – Donaldson	8 – Flood	5 – Davis	Robins Center (1,407); Richmond, VA
February 7, 2024; 7:00 p.m., ESPN+		Dayton	W 70–48	8–15 (3–9)	16 – Hayford	9 – Donaldson	5 – Donaldson	Rose Hill Gymnasium (579); The Bronx, NY
February 10, 2024; 2:00 p.m., SNY/ESPN+		UMass	W 64–50	9–15 (4–9)	17 – Hayford	10 – Donaldson	5 – Davis	Rose Hill Gymnasium (1,168); The Bronx, NY
February 18, 2024; 1:00 p.m., ESPN+		at St. Bonaventure	W 70–48	10–15 (5–9)	25 – Davis	7 – 2 tied	4 – Davis	Reilly Center (364); St. Bonaventure, NY
February 21, 2024; 7:00 p.m., SNY/ESPN+		Saint Louis	W 79–64	11–15 (6–9)	22 – Hayford	8 – 2 tied	6 – Hayford	Rose Hill Gymnasium (321); The Bronx, NY
February 24, 2024; 12:00 p.m., ESPN+		at Davidson	W 2–0 Forfeit	11–15 (7–9)	–	–	–	John M. Belk Arena; Davidson, NC
February 28, 2024; 7:00 p.m., ESPN+		at Saint Joseph's	W 62–57	12–15 (8–9)	18 – Donaldson	8 – 2 tied	2 – 2 tied	Hagan Arena (734); Philadelphia, PA
March 2, 2024; 2:00 p.m., ESPN+		La Salle	L 83–93	12–16 (8–10)	26 – Donaldson	13 – Ly	8 – Davis	Rose Hill Gymnasium (422); The Bronx, NY
A-10 tournament
March 7, 2024; 11:00 a.m., ESPN+	(9)	vs. (8) Loyola Chicago; Second round	L 52–53	12–17	15 – Donaldson	9 – Ly	4 – Davis	Henrico Sports & Events Center; Henrico, VA
*Non-conference game. ^{#}Rankings from AP poll. (#) Tournament seedings in parentheses. All times are in Eastern.
