= 2023–24 Richmond Spiders women's basketball team =

Intercollegiate basketball season

2023–24 Richmond Spiders women's basketball

Atlantic 10 regular season and tournament champions

NCAA tournament, First Round
- Conference: Atlantic 10 Conference
- Record: 29–6 (16–2 A-10)
- Head coach: Aaron Roussell (5th season)
- Assistant coaches: Jeanine Radice; Brittany Pinkney; Ariel Stephenson; Alex Louin; John Studer
- Home arena: Robins Center

2023–24 Atlantic 10 women's basketball standings
	Conf.				Overall
Team	W		L	PCT	W		L	PCT
Richmond †	16	–	2	.889	29	–	6	.829
VCU	15	–	3	.833	26	–	6	.813
Saint Joseph's	15	–	3	.833	28	–	6	.824
George Mason	14	–	4	.778	23	–	8	.742
Duquesne	13	–	5	.722	21	–	13	.618
Rhode Island	10	–	8	.556	21	–	14	.600
Saint Louis	9	–	9	.500	22	–	18	.550
Davidson*	8	–	10	.444	18	–	8	.692
Loyola Chicago	8	–	10	.444	15	–	16	.484
Fordham	8	–	10	.444	12	–	17	.414
George Washington	6	–	12	.333	13	–	18	.419
Dayton	5	–	13	.278	12	–	19	.387
La Salle	5	–	13	.278	8	–	22	.267
UMass	2	–	16	.111	5	–	27	.156
St. Bonaventure	1	–	17	.056	4	–	26	.133
† 2024 A10 tournament winner * Season cancelled on March 1, 2024.

The 2023–24 Richmond Spiders women's basketball team represented the University of Richmond during the 2023–24 NCAA Division I women's basketball season. The Spiders, led by fifth-year head coach Aaron Roussell, played their home games at the Robins Center and were members of the Atlantic 10 Conference.

Richmond went undefeated at home en route to the Atlantic 10 regular-season conference and A-10 Tournament titles. The team qualified for its fourth-ever NCAA tournament and first since 2005, earning a #10 seed and a rematch with against Duke, who beat the Spiders by 30 in the season opener. In the NCAA Tournament, Richmond raced out to a 37–28 halftime lead, before fading in the second half to drop the game 72–61.

== Previous season ==
The Spiders finished the 2022–23 season with a record of 21–11, 8–6 in A-10 play to finish in fifth place. In the A-10 women's tournament, they received a first-round bye before defeating No. 12 seed Dayton in the second round and No. 4 seed Fordham in the quarterfinals. The Spiders ultimately fell to No. 1 seed Massachusetts in the semifinals.

The Spiders then received an at-large invitation to the 2023 WNIT, where they defeated Penn in the first round before being eliminated by conference foe Rhode Island in the second round.

== Roster ==
2023–24 Richmond Spiders women's basketball team
Players
Coaches

Pos.	#	Name	Height	Year	Previous school	Hometown
G	0	Laren VanArsdale	5 ft 3 in (1.6 m)	GS	Hillgrove; Hampton	Powder Springs, GA
G	1	Grace Townsend	5 ft 5 in (1.65 m)	Sr	James River	Midlothian, VA
F	2	Anna Camden (injured)	6 ft 3 in (1.91 m)	GS	Shipley School; Penn State	Downingtown, PA
F	4	Jada Green	6 ft 1 in (1.85 m)	So	St. Thomas Aquinas High School	Parkland, FL
F	10	Melissa Mwanza	6 ft 2 in (1.88 m)	Fr	Life Christian Academy	Harare, Zimbabwe
G	11	Torin Rogers	6 ft 1 in (1.85 m)	So	Murphy	Brasstown, NC
G	14	Ally Sweeney	5 ft 6 in (1.68 m)	Fr	Sparta	Sparta, NJ
F	20	Addie Budnik	6 ft 2 in (1.88 m)	Sr	Highland Park	Highland Park, IL
G	21	Kylee Lewandowski	6 ft 1 in (1.85 m)	Sr	North Catholic	Pittsburgh, PA
G	22	Rachel Ullstrom	6 ft 1 in (1.85 m)	So	Marianapolis Prep	Auburn, MA
F	23	Courtney Swider	6 ft 4 in (1.93 m)	Fr	Tabor Academy	Portsmouth, RI
F	24	Faye Parker	6 ft 3 in (1.91 m)	GS	Tabor Academy; Penn	Swampscott, MA
G	25	Katie Hill	6 ft 0 in (1.83 m)	Jr	Saint John Vianney	Colts Neck, NJ
G	32	Siobhan Ryan	6 ft 0 in (1.83 m)	Sr	Sacred Heart	Buffalo, NY
F	44	Maggie Doogan	6 ft 2 in (1.88 m)	So	Cardinal O'Hara High School	Broomall, PA

Head coach

- Aaron Roussell (Iowa)

Assistant coach(es)

- Jeanine Radice (Fordham)
- Brittany Pinkney (VCU)
- Ariel Stephenson (Wake Forest)
- Alex Louin (Villanova)
- John Studer (Illinois)

Legend

- (C) Team captain
- (S) Suspended
- (I) Ineligible
- (W) Walk-on
- Injured
- Current redshirt

Roster
Last update: November 15, 2023

== Schedule ==
Richmond's 2023–24 non-conference schedule features 13 games, including a trio of games in the Drake Thanksgiving Invitational in Des Moines, Iowa, and another pair in the Cherokee Invitational in Cherokee, North Carolina.

In the Atlantic 10 portion of the schedule, Richmond is scheduled to play a total of 18 games, including both home and away games against Duquesne, George Washington, Rhode Island, and VCU. In addition, Richmond is scheduled to host Dayton, Fordham, La Salle, Loyola Chicago, and Massachusetts, while the Spiders will travel to Davidson, George Mason, Saint Joseph's, Saint Louis, and St. Bonaventure.

Date time, TV	Rank^{#}	Opponent^{#}	Result	Record	High points	High rebounds	High assists	Site (attendance) city, state
Non-conference regular season
November 6, 2023*; 11:00 am, ACCNX		at Duke	L 53–83	0–1	17 – Budnik	6 – Budnik	3 – Hill	Cameron Indoor Stadium (1,864); Durham, NC
November 12, 2023*; 2:00 pm, ESPN+		Delaware State	W 105–44	1–1	15 – Ryan	5 – Tied	8 – Townsend	Robins Center (909); Richmond, VA
November 15, 2023*; 11:00 am, ESPN+		at Gardner–Webb	W 80–53	2–1	25 – Doogan	10 – Doogan	8 – Townsend	Paul Porter Arena (2,167); Boiling Springs, NC
November 18, 2023*; 6:00 pm, ESPN+		American	W 76–44	3–1	20 – Ryan	11 – Budnik	3 – Tied	Robins Center (410); Richmond, VA
November 24, 2023*; 5:30 pm, ESPN+		vs. Maine; Drake Thanksgiving Invitational	W 77–43	4–1	27 – Doogan	8 – Tied	3 – Tied	Knapp Center (1,734); Des Moines, IA
November 25, 2023*; 3:00 pm, ESPN+		at Drake; Drake Thanksgiving Invitational	W 74–66	5–1	17 – Budnik	7 – Tied	7 – Townsend	Knapp Center (1,861); Des Moines, IA
November 26, 2023*; 12:30 pm, ESPN+		vs. Louisiana Tech; Drake Thanksgiving Invitational	W 83–56	6–1	21 – Doogan	6 – Doogan	6 – Budnik	Knapp Center (580); Des Moines, IA
November 30, 2023*; 7:00 pm, FloHoops		at Villanova	L 57–67	6–2	18 – Doogan	8 – Townsend	6 – Towsend	Finneran Pavilion (2,241); Villanova, PA
December 3, 2023*; 2:00 pm, ESPN+		Le Moyne	W 69–40	7–2	18 – Doogan	7 – Budnik	5 – Townsend	Robins Center (478); Richmond, VA
December 10, 2023*; 2:00 pm, ESPN+		Appalachian State	W 80–77 ^{OT}	8–2	28 – Doogan	8 – Ullstrom	3 – Tied	Robins Center (1,395); Richmond, VA
December 16, 2023*; 2:00 pm, ESPN+		Liberty	W 99–73	9–2	22 – Doogan	7 – Ullstrom	5 – Tied	Robins Center (747); Richmond, VA
December 20, 2023*; 9:30 pm, BallerTV		vs. Michigan State; Cherokee Invitational	L 76–83	9–3	17 – Budnik	7 – Townsend	7 – Townsend	Harrah's Cherokee (302); Cherokee, NC
December 21, 2023*; 7:00 pm, BallerTV		vs. Chattanooga; Cherokee Invitational	W 64–60	10–3	17 – Doogan	7 – Doogan	6 – Budnik	Harrah's Cherokee (422); Cherokee, NC
Atlantic 10 regular season
December 30, 2023 noon, ESPN+/Monumental		at George Washington	W 70–66	11–3 (1–0)	26 – Townsend	4 – Tied	2 – Tied	Charles E. Smith Center (284); Washington, D.C.
January 3, 2024; 6:00 pm, ESPN+/MASN		VCU; Capital City Classic	W 72–65	12–3 (2–0)	21 – Townsend	7 – Doogan	8 – Doogan	Robins Center (1,226); Richmond, VA
January 6, 2024; 2:00 pm, ESPN+		at Saint Joseph's	W 64–59	13–3 (3–0)	16 – Tied	7 – Tied	6 – Townsend	Hagan Arena (650); Philadelphia, PA
January 10, 2024; 11:00 am, ESPN+		UMass	W 79–65	14–3 (4–0)	26 – Ullstrom	6 – Ullstrom	7 – Townsend	Robins Center (1,904); Richmond, VA
January 14, 2024 noon, CBSSN		Rhode Island	W 71–67	15–3 (5–0)	26 – Townsend	8 – Doogan	3 – Tied	Robins Center (1,273); Richmond, VA
January 17, 2024; 7:00 pm, ESPN+		at Davidson	W 59–54	16–3 (6–0)	15 – Townsend	8 – Tied	4 – Townsend	John M. Belk Arena (712); Davidson, NC
January 20, 2024; 6:00 pm, ESPN+		Dayton	W 72–39	17–3 (7–0)	21 – Doogan	9 – Ullstrom	5 – Doogan	Robins Center (1,956); Richmond, VA
January 24, 2024; 6:00 pm, ESPN+		at Duquesne	L 59–72	17–4 (7–1)	13 – Ryan	7 – Townsend	5 – Townsend	UPMC Cooper Fieldhouse (791); Pittsburgh, PA
January 28, 2024; 3:00 pm, ESPN+		at Saint Louis	W 72–61	18–4 (8–1)	21 – Budnik	10 – Hill	7 – Townsend	Chaifetz Arena (1,112); St. Louis, MO
February 3, 2024; 6:00 pm, ESPN+		Fordham	W 79–60	19–4 (9–1)	18 – Ullstrom	7 – Townsend	6 – Townsend	Robins Center (1,407); Richmond, VA
February 7, 2024; 6:00 pm, ESPN+		at Rhode Island	W 68–49	20–4 (10–1)	14 – Ryan	6 – Budnik	6 – Hill	Ryan Center (1,502); Kingston, RI
February 11, 2024; 1:00 pm, ESPN+		George Washington	W 83–61	21–4 (11–1)	24 – Ullstrom	6 – Townsend	6 – Townsend	Robins Center (2,437); Richmond, VA
February 14, 2024; 6:00 pm, NBC Sports App		at VCU; Capital City Classic	W 65–58	22–4 (12–1)	23 – Townsend	7 – Doogan	4 – Townsend	Siegel Center (854); Richmond, VA
February 17, 2024; 6:00 pm, ESPN+		Loyola Chicago	W 75–71	23–4 (13–1)	20 – Doogan	8 – Tied	6 – Townsend	Robins Center (1,570); Richmond, VA
February 21, 2024; 6:00 pm, ESPN+		La Salle	W 74–54	24–4 (14–1)	20 – Ullstrom	9 – Budnik	6 – Townsend	Robins Center (832); Richmond, VA
February 24, 2024; 3:00 pm, ESPN+		at George Mason	L 76–82 ^{OT}	24–5 (14–2)	20 – Doogan	11 – Doogan	9 – Townsend	EagleBank Arena (2,457); Fairfax, VA
February 28, 2024; 6:00 pm, ESPN+		Duquesne	W 90–74	25–5 (15–2)	19 – Townsend	6 – Doogan	6 – Tied	Robins Center (1,007); Richmond, VA
March 2, 2024; 1:00 pm, ESPN+		at St. Bonaventure	W 61–46	26–5 (16–2)	19 – Doogan	7 – Budnik	3 – Budnik	Reilly Center (225); St. Bonaventure, NY
Atlantic 10 Tournament
March 8, 2024; 11:00 am, ESPN+	(1)	vs. (8) Loyola Chicago; Quarterfinals	W 70–54	27–5	18 – Budnik	7 – Ullstrom	9 – Townsend	Henrico Sports & Events Center (3,556); Glen Allen, VA
March 9, 2024; 11:00 am, CBSSN	(1)	vs. (5) Duquesne; Semifinals	W 80–66	28–5	22 – Budnik	8 – Doogan	8 – Townsend	Henrico Sports & Events Center (2,271); Glen Allen, VA
March 10, 2024; 4:00 pm, ESPN2	(1)	vs. (6) Rhode Island; Championship	W 65–51	29–5	18 – Doogan	9 – Hill	5 – Townsend	Henrico Sports & Events Center (3,089); Glen Allen, VA
NCAA tournament
March 22, 2024*; 2:30 pm, ESPNews	(10 P3)	vs. (7 P3) Duke; First round	L 61–72	29–6	18 – Townsend	7 – Doogan	8 – Townsend	Value City Arena; Columbus, OH
*Non-conference game. ^{#}Rankings from AP Poll. (#) Tournament seedings in parentheses. All times are in Eastern Time.

== Rankings ==
Ranking movements Legend: ██ Increase in ranking ██ Decrease in ranking — = Not ranked RV = Received votes
	Week																				
Poll	Pre	1	2	3	4	5	6	7	8	9	10	11	12	13	14	15	16	17	18	19	Final
AP	—	—	—	—	—	—	—	—	—	—	—	RV	—	—	—	—	—	RV	RV	RV	—
Coaches	—	—	—	—	—	—	—	—	—	—	—	RV	—	—	—	RV	RV	RV	RV	RV	RV
