= 2023–24 George Mason Patriots women's basketball team =

American college basketball season

2023–24 George Mason Patriots women's basketball

WBIT, First Round
- Conference: Atlantic 10 Conference
- Record: 23–8 (14–4 A-10)
- Head coach: Vanessa Blair-Lewis (4th season)
- Associate head coach: Niki Washington; Andre Bolton
- Assistant coach: Demetria Frank
- Home arena: EagleBank Arena

2023–24 Atlantic 10 women's basketball standings
	Conf.				Overall
Team	W		L	PCT	W		L	PCT
Richmond †	16	–	2	.889	29	–	6	.829
VCU	15	–	3	.833	26	–	6	.813
Saint Joseph's	15	–	3	.833	28	–	6	.824
George Mason	14	–	4	.778	23	–	8	.742
Duquesne	13	–	5	.722	21	–	13	.618
Rhode Island	10	–	8	.556	21	–	14	.600
Saint Louis	9	–	9	.500	22	–	18	.550
Davidson*	8	–	10	.444	18	–	8	.692
Loyola Chicago	8	–	10	.444	15	–	16	.484
Fordham	8	–	10	.444	12	–	17	.414
George Washington	6	–	12	.333	13	–	18	.419
Dayton	5	–	13	.278	12	–	19	.387
La Salle	5	–	13	.278	8	–	22	.267
UMass	2	–	16	.111	5	–	27	.156
St. Bonaventure	1	–	17	.056	4	–	26	.133
† 2024 A10 tournament winner * Season cancelled on March 1, 2024.

The 2023–24 George Mason Patriots women's basketball team represented George Mason University during the 2023–24 NCAA Division I women's basketball season. The Patriots, led by fourth-year head coach Vanessa Blair-Lewis, played their home games at EagleBank Arena in Fairfax, Virginia as members of the Atlantic 10 Conference.

== Previous season ==
The Patriots finished the 2022–23 season 16–15, 8–8 in A-10 play to finish in a tie for ninth place. As the #9 seed in the A-10 tournament, they defeated #8 seed La Salle in the second round, before falling to top-seeded UMass in the quarterfinals.

== Roster ==
2023–24 George Mason Patriots women's basketball team
Players
Coaches

Pos.	#	Name	Height	Year	Previous school	Hometown
G	0	Taylor Jameson	5 ft 6 in (1.68 m)	Sr	Wichita Heights High School	Wichita, Kansas
C	1	Jazmyn Doster	6 ft 2 in (1.88 m)	GS	Lake Taylor High School	Norfolk, Virginia
F	2	Zahirah Walton	5 ft 11 in (1.8 m)	So	Kentlake High School	Seattle, Washington
G	3	Kennedy Harris	5 ft 7 in (1.7 m)	Fr	Hampton High School	Hampton, Virginia
G	4	Sonia Smith	5 ft 7 in (1.7 m)	Sr	Sacred Heart	Upper Marlboro, Maryland
G	5	Brianna Hill	5 ft 11 in (1.8 m)	Fr	Example Academy	Lansing, Illinois
F	10	Trinity Massenburg	6 ft 0 in (1.83 m)	Fr	Baltimore Polytechnic Institute	Baltimore, Maryland
F	11	Nekhu Mitchell	6 ft 0 in (1.83 m)	So	McDonogh School	Baltimore, Maryland
G	13	Jada Brown	5 ft 6 in (1.68 m)	So	New Hope Academy	Falls Church, Virginia
G	14	Paula Suárez	6 ft 0 in (1.83 m)	Jr	IES Mateo Hernandez	Pamplona, Spain
F	21	Faith Okorie	6 ft 0 in (1.83 m)	Fr	Example Academy	Chicago, Illinois
G	22	Ta'Viyanna Habib	5 ft 11 in (1.8 m)	Jr	Indian River State College	Tampa, Florida
G	23	Carmen Williams	5 ft 10 in (1.78 m)	Jr	Radford	Voorhees, New Jersey
F	30	Amy O'Hara	6 ft 3 in (1.91 m)	So	Bacchus Marsh Grammar School	Hoppers Crossing, Victoria
G	32	Page Greenburg	5 ft 9 in (1.75 m)	So	Brown	Washington, D.C.
F	42	Nalani Kaysia	6 ft 2 in (1.88 m)	Sr	Charlotte	Washington, D.C.

Head coach

- Vanessa Blair-Lewis (Mount St. Mary's)

Assistant coach(es)

- Niki Washington (Southern Illinois)
- Andre Bolton (Christopher Newport)
- Demetria Frank (Bethune–Cookman)

Legend

- (C) Team captain
- (S) Suspended
- (I) Ineligible
- (W) Walk-on
- Injured
- Current redshirt

Roster
Last update: December 19, 2023

== Schedule and results ==
Date time, TV	Rank^{#}	Opponent^{#}	Result	Record	High points	High rebounds	High assists	Site (attendance) city, state
Non-conference regular season
November 6, 2023*; 2:00 pm, ESPN+		Bowie State	W 96–45	1–0	18 – Habib	10 – Walton	5 – Suárez	EagleBank Arena (673); Fairfax, VA
November 9, 2023*; 7:00 pm, ESPN+		Marshall	W 84–77	2–0	20 – Habib	10 – Kaysia	4 – Smith	EagleBank Arena (706); Fairfax, VA
November 12, 2023*; 1:00 pm, FloHoops		at William & Mary	W 77–72	3–0	16 – 2 Tied	8 – Kaysia	5 – Jameson	Kaplan Arena (962); Williamsburg, VA
November 15, 2023*; 4:00 pm, ESPN+		Pittsburgh	W 60–52	4–0	15 – Smith	6 – 2 Tied	5 – Suárez	EagleBank Arena (1,181); Fairfax, VA
November 18, 2023*; 4:00 pm, ESPN+		Robert Morris	W 83–63	5–0	13 – Harris	6 – Habib	4 – Smith	EagleBank Arena (915); Fairfax, VA
November 22, 2023*; 1:00 pm, ESPN+		at American	W 72–62	6–0	18 – Smith	9 – Doster	6 – Smith	Bender Arena (439); Washington, D.C.
November 26, 2023*; 1:00 pm, ESPN+		at Coppin State	W 70–38	7–0	10 – Smith	9 – Mitchell	3 – Suárez	Physical Education Complex (418); Baltimore, MD
December 3, 2023*; 1:00 pm, B1G+		at Maryland	L 77–86	7–1	21 – Smith	14 – Walton	4 – Smith	Xfinity Center (5,901); College Park, MD
December 9, 2023*; 1:00 pm, ESPN+		at Mount St. Mary's	W 77–30	8–1	15 – Harris	7 – 3 Tied	6 – 2 Tied	Knott Arena (624); Emmitsburg, MD
December 18, 2023*; 6:00 pm, ESPN+		at East Carolina	L 44–65	8–2	9 – Habib	9 – Doster	2 – 2 Tied	Williams Arena (1,141); Greenville, NC
December 22, 2023*; 12:00 pm, FloHoops		at Towson	W 83–76	9–2	23 – Walton	10 – Smith	2 – 2 Tied	SECU Arena (515); Towson, MD
A-10 regular season
December 30, 2023; 6:00 pm, ESPN+		La Salle	W 74–37	10–2 (1–0)	12 – Walton	6 – 2 Tied	3 – 2 Tied	EagleBank Arena (5,100); Fairfax, VA
January 2, 2024; 6:00 pm, ESPN+		at Rhode Island	L 68–70	10–3 (1–1)	20 – Smith	7 – 2 Tied	2 – 2 Tied	Ryan Center (974); Kingston, RI
January 7, 2024; 12:00 pm, CBSSN		at Duquesne	W 101–75	11–3 (2–1)	30 – Smith	9 – Smith	8 – Smith	UPMC Cooper Fieldhouse (924); Pittsburgh, PA
January 10, 2024; 7:00 pm, ESPN+		Davidson	W 79–41	12–3 (3–1)	17 – Smith	7 – Habib	2 – 2 Tied	EagleBank Arena (740); Fairfax, VA
January 17, 2024; 7:00 pm, ESPN+		Saint Louis	W 91–61	13–3 (4–1)	21 – Walton	6 – Mitchell	3 – Suárez	EagleBank Arena (747); Fairfax, VA
January 21, 2024; 4:00 pm, CBSSN		at UMass	W 73–52	14–3 (5–1)	15 – Smith	10 – Doster	5 – Suárez	Mullins Center (1,485); Amherst, MA
January 24, 2024; 12:00 pm, ESPN+		at George Washington; Revolutionary Rivalry	W 57–41	15–3 (6–1)	23 – Walton	16 – Walton	3 – Smith	Charles E. Smith Center (602); Washington, D.C.
January 28, 2024; 3:00 pm, ESPN+/MASN		VCU; Rivalry	W 60–47	16–3 (7–1)	13 – 2 Tied	9 – Habib	4 – Smith	EagleBank Arena (2,048); Fairfax, VA
January 31, 2024; 7:00 pm, ESPN+		Fordham	W 54–47	17–3 (8–1)	15 – Smith	9 – Mitchell	4 – Smith	EagleBank Arena (743); Fairfax, VA
February 3, 2024; 3:00 pm, ESPN+		at Loyola Chicago	W 61–52	18–3 (9–1)	21 – Smith	7 – Jameson	6 – Suárez	Joseph J. Gentile Arena (492); Chicago, IL
February 8, 2024; 7:00 pm, NBC Sports App		Saint Joseph's	L 47–59	18–4 (9–2)	12 – Habib	8 – 2 Tied	3 – Suarez	EagleBank Arena (1,540); Fairfax, VA
February 11, 2024; 12:00 pm, ESPN+		at Dayton	W 74–50	19–4 (10–2)	19 – Walton	8 – Walton	5 – Smith	UD Arena (2,008); Dayton, OH
February 14, 2024; 7:00 pm, ESPN+		at Davidson	L 67–75	19–5 (10–3)	18 – Habib	10 – Habib	3 – Jameson	John M. Belk Arena (521); Davidson, NC
February 17, 2024; 3:00 pm, ESPN+/MASN		George Washington; Revolutionary Rivalry	W 60–57	20–5 (11–3)	17 – Doster	8 – Doster	6 – Suarez	EagleBank Arena (1,891); Fairfax, VA
February 21, 2024; 7:00 pm, ESPN+		at St. Bonaventure	W 57–53	21–5 (12–3)	19 – Habib	7 – Habib	4 – Suárez	Reilly Center (243); St. Bonaventure, NY
February 24, 2024; 3:00 pm, ESPN+		Richmond	W 82–76 ^{OT}	22–5 (13–3)	23 – Smith	14 – Walton	4 – Suárez	EagleBank Arena (2,457); Fairfax, VA
February 28, 2024; 7:00 pm, ESPN+		Dayton	W 78–53	23–5 (14–3)	27 – Harris	8 – Harris	4 – Smith	EagleBank Arena (1,142); Fairfax, VA
March 2, 2024; 1:00 pm, ESPN+		at VCU; Rivalry	L 56–61	23–6 (14–4)	23 – Smith	6 – Walton	4 – Suarez	Siegel Center (6,054); Richmond, VA
A-10 tournament
March 8, 2024; 1:30 p.m., ESPN+	(4)	vs. (5) Duquesne; Quarterfinals	L 62–63	23–7	24 – Smith	7 – Walton	3 – Smith	Henrico Sports & Events Center (3,556); Henrico, VA
WBIT
March 21, 2024*; 6:00 p.m., ESPN+		at (1) Penn State; First Round	L 80–84 ^{OT}	23–8	24 – 2 Tied	7 – Doster	6 – Suárez	Bryce Jordan Center (1,635); University Park, PA
*Non-conference game. ^{#}Rankings from AP Poll. (#) Tournament seedings in parentheses. All times are in Eastern.
