= 2023–24 Rhode Island Rams women's basketball team =

Intercollegiate basketball season

2023–24 Rhode Island Rams women's basketball
- Conference: Atlantic 10 Conference
- Record: 21–14 (10–8 A-10)
- Head coach: Tammi Reiss (5th season)
- Associate head coach: Megan Shoniker
- Assistant coaches: Adeniyi Amadou; Takima Keane
- Home arena: Ryan Center

2023–24 Atlantic 10 women's basketball standings
| | Conf. | | | | Overall |
| Team | W | | L | PCT | W | | L | PCT |
|---|---|---|---|---|---|---|---|---|
| Richmond † | 16 | – | 2 | .889 | 29 | – | 6 | .829 |
| VCU | 15 | – | 3 | .833 | 26 | – | 6 | .813 |
| Saint Joseph's | 15 | – | 3 | .833 | 28 | – | 6 | .824 |
| George Mason | 14 | – | 4 | .778 | 23 | – | 8 | .742 |
| Duquesne | 13 | – | 5 | .722 | 21 | – | 13 | .618 |
| Rhode Island | 10 | – | 8 | .556 | 21 | – | 14 | .600 |
| Saint Louis | 9 | – | 9 | .500 | 22 | – | 18 | .550 |
| Davidson* | 8 | – | 10 | .444 | 18 | – | 8 | .692 |
| Loyola Chicago | 8 | – | 10 | .444 | 15 | – | 16 | .484 |
| Fordham | 8 | – | 10 | .444 | 12 | – | 17 | .414 |
| George Washington | 6 | – | 12 | .333 | 13 | – | 18 | .419 |
| Dayton | 5 | – | 13 | .278 | 12 | – | 19 | .387 |
| La Salle | 5 | – | 13 | .278 | 8 | – | 22 | .267 |
| UMass | 2 | – | 16 | .111 | 5 | – | 27 | .156 |
| St. Bonaventure | 1 | – | 17 | .056 | 4 | – | 26 | .133 |
† 2024 A10 tournament winner * Season cancelled on March 1, 2024.

The 2023–24 Rhode Island Rams women's basketball team represented the University of Rhode Island during the 2023–24 NCAA Division I women's basketball season. The Rams, led by fifth-year head coach Tammi Reiss, play their home games at the Ryan Center in Kingston, Rhode Island as a member of the Atlantic 10 Conference.

== Offseason ==
=== Incoming transfers ===
| Name | Number | Pos. | Height | Year | Hometown | Previous school |
|---|---|---|---|---|---|---|
| Teisha Hyman | 5 | G | 5'8" | GS Senior | White Plains, N.Y. | Syracuse |

== Roster ==
2023–24 Rhode Island Rams women's basketball team
Players
Coaches

| Pos. | # | Name | Height | Year | Previous school | Hometown |
|---|---|---|---|---|---|---|
| G | 0 | Chantelle Blagrove | 5 ft 9 in (1.75 m) | So | Niagara Prep | Ajax, Ontario (Canada) |
| G | 1 | Sophie Phillips | 6 ft 0 in (1.83 m) | Jr | Cambridge Central School | Greenwich, N.Y. (United States) (New York (state)) |
| G | 2 | Katie Ledden | 6 ft 0 in (1.83 m) | Fr | Rutgers Prep | Clark, N.J. (United States) (New Jersey) |
| C | 4 | Tenin Magassa | 6 ft 5 in (1.96 m) | Sr | Jean Moulin; Dayton | Morsang-Sur-Orge, France |
| G | 5 | Teisha Hyman | 5 ft 8 in (1.73 m) | GS | Woodlands; Syracuse | White Plains, N.Y. (United States) (New York (state)) |
| F | 11 | Hawa Komara | 6 ft 0 in (1.83 m) | RS So | Alain Fournier School | Toulouse, France |
| F | 13 | Anaelle Dutat | 6 ft 0 in (1.83 m) | So | Lycee Victor Hugo | Cesson, France |
| G | 15 | Sophia Vital | 5 ft 5 in (1.65 m) | Fr | Tabor Academy | Chelsea, Mass. (United States) (Massachusetts) |
| F | 20 | Mayé Touré | 6 ft 2 in (1.88 m) | Sr | Lycée Alain Fournier | Athis-Mons, France |
| G | 21 | Eva DeChent | 5 ft 11 in (1.8 m) | Fr | Putnam Valley | Putnam Valley, N.Y. (United States) (New York (state)) |
| G | 30 | Ines Debroise | 5 ft 9 in (1.75 m) | So | Insep | Paris, France |
| G | 32 | Dee Dee Davis | 5 ft 8 in (1.73 m) | GS | Truman; Manhattan | Bronx, N.Y. (United States) (New York (state)) |
| C | 55 | Sophie Sene | 6 ft 3 in (1.91 m) | RS So | Lycee Hector Berlioz | Nice, France |

Head coach

- Tammi Reiss (Virginia)

Assistant coach(es)

- Megan Shoniker (Rhode Island)
- Adeniyi Amadou (Indiana (PA))
- Takima Keane (Cleveland State)

Legend

- (C) Team captain
- (S) Suspended
- (I) Ineligible
- (W) Walk-on
- Injured
- Current redshirt

Roster
Last update: October 26, 2023

== Schedule and results ==
| Date time, TV | Rank^{#} | Opponent^{#} | Result | Record | Site (attendance) city, state |
Non-conference regular season
| Nov 7, 2023*; 6:00 p.m., ESPN+ | | Sacred Heart | W 91–40 | 1–0 | Ryan Center (1,260); Kingston, RI |
| Nov 10, 2023*; 6:00 p.m., ESPN+ | | UMass Lowell | W 78–38 | 2–0 | Ryan Center (1,317); Kingston, RI |
| Nov 14, 2023*; 6:00 p.m., ESPN+ | | at Maine | L 48–59 | 2–1 | Memorial Gymnasium (930); Orono, ME |
| Nov 17, 2023*; 7:00 p.m., ESPN+ | | at Brown | W 67–56 | 3–1 | Pizzitola Sports Center (367); Providence, RI |
| Nov 19, 2023*; 2:00 p.m., ACCNX | | at No. 14 NC State | L 58–67 | 3–2 | Reynolds Coliseum (5,023); Raleigh, NC |
| Nov 24, 2023*; 5:30 p.m. | | vs. Youngstown State; Las Vegas Holiday Classic | W 63–50 | 4–2 | Orleans Arena; Paradise, NV |
| Nov 25, 2023*; 3:00 p.m. | | vs. Portland; Las Vegas Holiday Classic | W 64–58 | 5–2 | Orleans Arena; Paradise, NV |
| Nov 30, 2023*; 6:00 p.m., ESPN+ | | Quinnipiac | L 59–61 | 5–3 | Ryan Center (1,137); Kingston, RI |
| Dec 3, 2023*; 1:00 p.m., ESPN+ | | No. 25 Princeton | W 60–58 | 6–3 | Ryan Center (1,149); Kingston, RI |
| Dec 6, 2023*; 7:00 p.m., FloSports | | at Providence | L 50–51 | 6–4 | Alumni Hall (790); Providence, RI |
| Dec 10, 2023*; 2:00 p.m., FloSports | | at St. John's | L 44–55 | 6–5 | Carnesecca Arena (316); Queens, NY |
| Dec 21, 2023*; 11:00 a.m., ESPN+ | | Le Moyne | W 97–53 | 7–5 | Ryan Center (6,918); Kingston, RI |
| Dec 28, 2023*; 6:00 p.m., ESPN+ | | Harvard | W 59–56 | 8–5 | Ryan Center (1,416); Kingston, RI |
A10 regular season
| Dec 30, 2023; 8:00 p.m., ESPN+ | | at Saint Louis | W 63–58 | 9–5 (1–0) | Chaifetz Arena (1,247); St. Louis, MO |
| Jan 2, 2024; 6:00 p.m., ESPN+ | | George Mason | W 70–68 | 10–5 (2–0) | Ryan Center (974); Kingston, RI |
| Jan 6, 2024; 1:00 p.m., ESPN+ | | St. Bonaventure | W 65–41 | 11–5 (3–0) | Ryan Center (1,200); Kingston, RI |
| Jan 10, 2024; 7:00 p.m., ESPN+ | | at Loyola Chicago | L 56–61 | 11–6 (3–1) | Joseph J. Gentile Arena (306); Chicago, IL |
| Jan 14, 2024; 12:00 p.m., CBSSN | | at Richmond | L 67–71 | 11–7 (3–2) | Robins Center (1,273); Richmond, VA |
| Jan 17, 2024; 6:00 p.m., ESPN+ | | Fordham | W 55–44 | 12–7 (4–2) | Ryan Center (1,013); Kingston, RI |
| Jan 21, 2024; 12:00 p.m., ESPNU | | Saint Joseph's | L 48–51 | 12–8 (4–3) | Ryan Center (1,566); Kingston, RI |
| Jan 24, 2024; 11:00 a.m., ESPN+ | | at La Salle | W 75–47 | 13–8 (5–3) | Tom Gola Arena (1,202); Philadelphia, PA |
| Jan 27, 2024; 1:00 p.m., ESPN+ | | UMass | W 63–48 | 14–8 (6–3) | Ryan Center (1,674); Kingston, RI |
| Jan 31, 2024; 6:00 p.m., ESPN+ | | at George Washington | W 66–52 | 15–8 (7–3) | Charles E. Smith Center (512); Washington, D.C. |
| Feb 3, 2024; 2:00 p.m., ESPN+ | | at Duquesne | L 61–70 | 15–9 (7–4) | UPMC Cooper Fieldhouse (1,175); Pittsburgh, PA |
| Feb 7, 2024; 6:00 p.m., ESPN+ | | Richmond | L 49–68 | 15–10 (7–5) | Ryan Center (1,502); Kingston, RI |
| Feb 11, 2024; 12:00 p.m., ESPNU | | Saint Louis | L 73–76 | 15–11 (7–6) | Ryan Center (1,225); Kingston, RI |
| Feb 14, 2024; 6:00 p.m., ESPN+ | | at UMass | W 86–64 | 16–11 (8–6) | Mullins Center (815); Amherst, MA |
| Feb 17, 2024; 1:00 p.m., ESPN+ | | Davidson | W 61–49 | 17–11 (9–6) | Ryan Center (1,319); Kingston, RI |
| Feb 24, 2024; 2:00 p.m., ESPN+ | | at Saint Joseph's | L 67–72 | 17–12 (9–7) | Hagan Arena (1,222); Philadelphia, PA |
| Feb 28, 2024; 6:00 p.m., ESPN+ | | VCU | L 59–69 | 17–13 (9–8) | Ryan Center (1,439); Kingston, RI |
| Mar 2, 2024; 12:00 p.m., ESPN+ | | at Dayton | W 77–42 | 18–13 (10–8) | UD Arena (2,359); Dayton, OH |
Atlantic 10 Tournament
| Mar 7, 2024; 7:30 p.m., ESPN+ | (6) | vs. (11) Dayton; Second Round | W 70–57 | 19–13 | Henrico Sports & Events Center (1,188); Henrico, VA |
| Mar 8, 2024; 7:30 p.m., ESPN+ | (6) | vs. (3) Saint Joseph's; Quarterfinals | W 57–47 | 20–13 | Henrico Sports & Events Center (2,185); Henrico, VA |
| Mar 9, 2024; 1:30 p.m., CBSSN | (6) | vs. (7) Saint Louis; Semifinals | W 68–62 | 21–13 | Henrico Sports & Events Center (2,271); Henrico, VA |
| Mar 10, 2024; 4:00 p.m., ESPN2 | (6) | vs. (1) Richmond; Championship | L 51–65 | 21–14 | Henrico Sports & Events Center (3,089); Henrico, VA |
*Non-conference game. ^{#}Rankings from AP Poll. (#) Tournament seedings in parentheses. All times are in Eastern.
