= 2023–24 Dayton Flyers women's basketball team =

American college basketball season

2023–24 Dayton Flyers women's basketball
- Conference: Atlantic 10 Conference
- Record: 12–19 (5–13 A–10)
- Head coach: Tamika Williams-Jeter (2nd season)
- Assistant coaches: Kalisha Keane; Bryce Agler; Darryl Hudson; Trendale Perkins; Julie Bolden
- Home arena: UD Arena

2023–24 Atlantic 10 women's basketball standings
	Conf.				Overall
Team	W		L	PCT	W		L	PCT
Richmond †	16	–	2	.889	29	–	6	.829
VCU	15	–	3	.833	26	–	6	.813
Saint Joseph's	15	–	3	.833	28	–	6	.824
George Mason	14	–	4	.778	23	–	8	.742
Duquesne	13	–	5	.722	21	–	13	.618
Rhode Island	10	–	8	.556	21	–	14	.600
Saint Louis	9	–	9	.500	22	–	18	.550
Davidson*	8	–	10	.444	18	–	8	.692
Loyola Chicago	8	–	10	.444	15	–	16	.484
Fordham	8	–	10	.444	12	–	17	.414
George Washington	6	–	12	.333	13	–	18	.419
Dayton	5	–	13	.278	12	–	19	.387
La Salle	5	–	13	.278	8	–	22	.267
UMass	2	–	16	.111	5	–	27	.156
St. Bonaventure	1	–	17	.056	4	–	26	.133
† 2024 A10 tournament winner * Season cancelled on March 1, 2024.

The 2023–24 Dayton Flyers women's basketball team represented the University of Dayton during the 2023–24 NCAA Division I women's basketball season. The Flyers, led by second-year head coach Tamika Williams-Jeter, played their home games at UD Arena in Dayton, Ohio as members of the Atlantic 10 Conference.

== Previous season ==
The Flyers finished the 2022–23 season 7–21, 5–10 in A–10 play to finish in 12th place. As the #12 seed in the A–10 tournament, they defeated #13 seed VCU in the first round, before falling to #5 seed Richmond in the second round.

== Roster ==
2023–24 Dayton Flyers women's basketball team
Players
Coaches

Pos.	#	Name	Height	Year	Previous school	Hometown
G	0	Denika Lightbourne	5 ft 9 in (1.75 m)	Fr	Tallulah Falls School	Nassau, Bahamas
G	1	Nayo Lear	5 ft 10 in (1.78 m)	So	Example Sports Academy	South Holland, Illinois
G	2	Taisiya Kozlova	6 ft 1 in (1.85 m)	Sr	Maryland	Moscow, Russia
G	3	Anyssa Jones	5 ft 10 in (1.78 m)	Sr	Ohio State	Westerville, Ohio
G	4	Lauren Pallotta	5 ft 9 in (1.75 m)	Fr	Massillon Jackson High School	Canton, Ohio
F	5	Arianna Smith	6 ft 2 in (1.88 m)	Jr	Indiana State	Columbus, Ohio
G	10	Ivy Wolf	5 ft 8 in (1.73 m)	Jr	Miami (OH)	Minster, Ohio
F	13	Shannon Wheeler	6 ft 0 in (1.83 m)	Jr	Renaissance High School	Detroit, Michigan
G/F	22	Saija Cleveland	6 ft 1 in (1.85 m)	RS Fr	Langham Creek High School	Houston, Texas
F	23	Mariah Perez	6 ft 3 in (1.91 m)	GS	Newark Tech High School	Newark, New Jersey
F	30	Riley Rismiller	6 ft 4 in (1.93 m)	Fr	Coldwater High School	Coldwater, Ohio
G	33	Destiny Bohanon	5 ft 10 in (1.78 m)	RS Sr	Wayne High School	Huber Heights, Ohio
G	42	Eleanor Monyek	6 ft 0 in (1.83 m)	So	Hinsdale Central High School	Clarendon Hills, Illinois
C	50	Eve Fiala	6 ft 4 in (1.93 m)	Fr	Indiana Area Senior High School	Indiana, Pennsylvania

Head coach

- Tamika Williams-Jeter (Connecticut)

Assistant coach(es)

- Kalisha Keane (Michigan State)
- Bryce Agler (Wittenberg)
- Darryl Hudson (Howard)
- Trendale Perkins (Ohio)
- Julie Bolden (Cincinnati)

Legend

- (C) Team captain
- (S) Suspended
- (I) Ineligible
- (W) Walk-on
- Injured
- Current redshirt

Roster
Last update: December 24, 2023

== Schedule and results ==
Date time, TV	Rank^{#}	Opponent^{#}	Result	Record	High points	High rebounds	High assists	Site (attendance) city, state
Regular season
November 6, 2023*; 7:00 pm, SNY		at No. 2 UConn	L 58–102	0–1	16 – Wolf	9 – Perez	2 – 3 Tied	XL Center (9,126); Hartford, CT
November 12, 2023*; 12:00 pm, ESPN+		Lindenwood	W 91–73	1–1	17 – Jones	15 – Smith	5 – Lear	UD Arena (1,762); Dayton, OH
November 16, 2023*; 7:00 pm, ESPN+		at Ohio	L 61–67	1–2	15 – Bohanon	12 – Smith	4 – Wolf	Convocation Center (704); Athens, OH
November 18, 2023*; 12:00 pm, ESPN+		Detroit Mercy	L 60–76	1–3	19 – Bohanon	8 – 2 Tied	2 – 2 Tied	UD Arena (1,586); Dayton, OH
November 20, 2023*; 7:00 pm, ESPN+		SIU Edwardsville	W 75–74	2–3	17 – Perez	13 – Perez	7 – Wolf	UD Arena (1,568); Dayton, OH
November 24, 2023*; 1:15 pm, FloHoops		vs. Stetson; Daytona Beach Classic	W 75–54	3–3	25 – Wolf	7 – Smith	6 – Bohanon	Ocean Center (200); Daytona Beach, FL
November 25, 2023*; 11:00 am, FloHoops		vs. Wichita State; Daytona Beach Classic	W 74–63	4–3	18 – Wolf	19 – Smith	4 – Smith	Ocean Center (200); Daytona Beach, FL
December 1, 2023*; 7:00 pm, ESPN+		Purdue	L 59–67	4–4	10 – 2 Tied	12 – Smith	6 – Wolf	UD Arena (3,250); Dayton, OH
December 5, 2023; 7:00 pm, ESPN+		at Davidson	L 53–81	4–5 (0–1)	11 – Bohanon	13 – Smith	2 – Wolf	John M. Belk Arena (711); Davidson, NC
December 9, 2023*; 1:00 pm, ESPN+		at Miami (OH)	W 73–60	5–5	14 – Jones	6 – Rismiller	6 – Wolf	Millett Hall (443); Oxford, OH
December 17, 2023*; 12:00 pm, ESPN+		Ohio Dominican	W 83–64	6–5	16 – Lear	21 – Smith	8 – Lear	UD Arena (2,013); Dayton, OH
December 20, 2023*; 2:00 pm, SECN+		at Vanderbilt	L 53–70	6–6	18 – Wolf	3 – 4 Tied	3 – Wolf	Memorial Gymnasium (1,855); Nashville, TN
December 30, 2023; 8:00 pm, ESPN+		Duquesne	L 42–70	6–7 (0–2)	9 – Bohanon	9 – Smith	2 – 2 Tied	UD Arena (2,249); Dayton, OH
January 2, 2024; 5:00 pm, ESPN+		at UMass	L 66–76	6–8 (0–3)	19 – Smith	11 – Smith	4 – 2 Tied	Mullins Center (752); Amherst, MA
January 6, 2024; 12:00 pm, ESPN+		Loyola Chicago	W 69–64	7–8 (1–3)	22 – 2 Tied	15 – Smith	3 – 2 Tied	UD Arena (1,810); Dayton, OH
January 12, 2024; 8:00 pm, ESPN+		at Saint Louis	L 70–74	7–9 (1–4)	16 – Wolf	13 – Smith	4 – Bohanon	Chaifetz Arena (2,118); St. Louis, MO
January 17, 2024; 7:00 pm, ESPN+		George Washington	W 71–53	8–9 (2–4)	16 – Wolf	13 – Perez	8 – Wolf	UD Arena (1,898); Dayton, OH
January 20, 2024; 6:00 pm, ESPN+		at Richmond	L 39–72	8–10 (2–5)	13 – Jones	12 – Smith	1 – 3 Tied	Robins Center (1,956); Richmond, VA
January 24, 2024; 11:00 am, ESPN+		VCU	L 62–73	8–11 (2–6)	15 – Jones	6 – Jones	8 – Wolf	UD Arena (12,097); Dayton, OH
January 28, 2024; 12:00 pm, CBSSN		St. Bonaventure	W 64–43	9–11 (3–6)	16 – 2 Tied	17 – Smith	3 – Bohanon	UD Arena (2,503); Dayton, OH
January 31, 2024; 7:00 pm, ESPN+		Saint Louis	L 61–87	9–12 (3–7)	15 – Fiala	10 – 2 Tied	4 – Wolf	UD Arena (1,879); Dayton, OH
February 4, 2024; 2:00 pm, ESPN+		at La Salle	W 72–69 ^{OT}	10–12 (4–7)	15 – Bohanon	13 – Jones	5 – Wolf	Tom Gola Arena (382); Philadelphia, PA
February 7, 2024; 7:00 pm, ESPN+		at Fordham	L 48–70	10–13 (4–8)	13 – Bohanon	14 – Smith	4 – Wolf	Rose Hill Gymnasium (579); Bronx, NY
February 11, 2024; 12:00 pm, ESPN+		George Mason	L 50–74	10–14 (4–9)	15 – Bohanon	10 – Perez	3 – Wolf	UD Arena (2,008); Dayton, OH
February 14, 2024; 7:00 pm, ESPN+		at Saint Joseph's	L 47–73	10–15 (4–10)	19 – Wolf	7 – Wolf	3 – Wolf	Hagan Arena (514); Philadelphia, PA
February 21, 2024; 7:00 pm, ESPN+		Davidson	W 2–0 Forfeit	10–15 (5–10)	–	–	–	UD Arena; Dayton, OH
February 21, 2024*; 7:00 pm, ESPN+		Miami (Hamilton)	W 112–45	11–15	22 – Jones	10 – Jones	4 – 2 Tied	UD Arena (1,679); Dayton, OH
February 25, 2024; 3:00 pm, ESPN+		at Loyola Chicago	L 61–64	11–16 (5–11)	14 – Smith	13 – Smith	6 – Lear	Joseph J. Gentile Arena (813); Chicago, IL
February 28, 2024; 7:00 pm, ESPN+		at George Mason	L 53–78	11–17 (5–12)	18 – Wolf	7 – Smith	2 – 3 Tied	EagleBank Arena (1,142); Fairfax, VA
March 2, 2024; 12:00 pm, ESPN+		Rhode Island	L 42–77	11–18 (5–13)	11 – Wolf	7 – Fiala	2 – Bohanon	UD Arena (2,359); Dayton, OH
A-10 tournament
March 6, 2024; 2:30 pm, ESPN+	(11)	vs. (14) St. Bonaventure; First Round	W 66–52	12–18	14 – Wolf	9 – Smith	5 – Wolf	Henrico Sports & Events Center (1,044); Henrico, VA
March 7, 2024; 7:30 pm, ESPN+	(11)	vs. (6) Rhode Island; Second Round	L 57–70	12–19	12 – Smith	8 – Smith	5 – 2 Tied	Henrico Sports & Events Center (1,188); Henrico, VA
*Non-conference game. ^{#}Rankings from AP Poll. (#) Tournament seedings in parentheses. All times are in Eastern.
