= 2023–24 George Washington Revolutionaries women's basketball team =

American college basketball season

2023–24 George Washington Revolutionaries women's basketball
- Conference: Atlantic 10 Conference
- Record: 13–18 (6–12 A–10)
- Head coach: Caroline McCombs (3rd season)
- Associate head coach: Ali Jaques
- Assistant coaches: Adam Call; Adria Crawford; Hailey Zeise
- Home arena: Charles E. Smith Center

2023–24 Atlantic 10 women's basketball standings
	Conf.				Overall
Team	W		L	PCT	W		L	PCT
Richmond †	16	–	2	.889	29	–	6	.829
VCU	15	–	3	.833	26	–	6	.813
Saint Joseph's	15	–	3	.833	28	–	6	.824
George Mason	14	–	4	.778	23	–	8	.742
Duquesne	13	–	5	.722	21	–	13	.618
Rhode Island	10	–	8	.556	21	–	14	.600
Saint Louis	9	–	9	.500	22	–	18	.550
Davidson*	8	–	10	.444	18	–	8	.692
Loyola Chicago	8	–	10	.444	15	–	16	.484
Fordham	8	–	10	.444	12	–	17	.414
George Washington	6	–	12	.333	13	–	18	.419
Dayton	5	–	13	.278	12	–	19	.387
La Salle	5	–	13	.278	8	–	22	.267
UMass	2	–	16	.111	5	–	27	.156
St. Bonaventure	1	–	17	.056	4	–	26	.133
† 2024 A10 tournament winner * Season cancelled on March 1, 2024.

The 2023–24 George Washington Revolutionaries women's basketball team represented George Washington University during the 2023–24 NCAA Division I women's basketball season. The Revolutionaries, led by third-year head coach Caroline McCombs, played their home games at Charles E. Smith Center in Washington, D.C. as a member of the Atlantic 10 Conference (A–10).

The Revolutionaries finished the season 13–18, 6–12 in A–10 play, to finish in 11th place. They were defeated by Saint Louis in the second round of the A–10 tournament.

== Previous season ==
The Colonials finished the 2022–23 season 18–13, 9–7 in A–10 play, to finish in a tie for sixth place. As the #7 seed in the A–10 tournament, they defeated #10 seed Duquesne in the second round, before falling to #2 seed Rhode Island in the quarterfinals.

On May 24, 2023, the school announced that they would be changing the nickname of its athletic teams from Colonials to Revolutionaries.

== Roster ==
2023–24 George Washington Revolutionaries women's basketball team
Players
Coaches

Pos.	#	Name	Height	Year	Previous school	Hometown
G	1	Madison Buford	5 ft 9 in (1.75 m)	GS	Hampton	St. Louis, MO
G	2	Nya Robertson	5 ft 7 in (1.7 m)	So	Boswell High School	Fort Worth, TX
F	4	Sara Lewis	6 ft 1 in (1.85 m)	Fr	Woodward Academy	Atlanta, GA
G	10	Nyaduoth Lok	5 ft 11 in (1.8 m)	GS	Midland College	Melbourne, Australia
G	12	Kamari Sims	6 ft 1 in (1.85 m)	Fr	Riverdale Baptist School	Severn, MD
F	13	Caia Loving	6 ft 2 in (1.88 m)	So	Riverdale Baptist School	Upper Marlboro, MD
G	15	Taylor Webster	5 ft 10 in (1.78 m)	Sr	UNC Wilmington	Washington, D.C.
F	20	Maxine Engel	6 ft 0 in (1.83 m)	Jr	Hutchison School	Memphis, TN
G	21	Monica Marsh	5 ft 5 in (1.65 m)	Fr	Plano West Senior High School	Plano, TX
G	22	Natalia Sierra-Vargas	5 ft 8 in (1.73 m)	So	The Bishop's School	San Diego, CA
F	23	Faith Blethen	6 ft 1 in (1.85 m)	GS	Boothbay Region High School	Boothbay, ME
G	24	Asjah Inniss	5 ft 9 in (1.75 m)	Sr	Northwest Florida State College	Duluth, GA
F	25	Jaylin Hartman	6 ft 2 in (1.88 m)	Fr	Blair Academy	Mendham, NJ
F	31	Mayowa Taiwo	6 ft 0 in (1.83 m)	GS	Rockbridge Academy	Hanover, MD
G	32	Essence Brown	5 ft 11 in (1.8 m)	GS	Galax High School	Galax, VA
F	33	Maren Durant	6 ft 3 in (1.91 m)	GS	Boston University	Winchester, MA

Head coach

- Caroline McCombs (Youngstown State)

Assistant coach(es)

- Ali Jaques (NYU)
- Adam Call (Oklahoma)
- Adria Crawford (Georgetown)
- Hailey Zeise (Stony Brook)

Legend

- (C) Team captain
- (S) Suspended
- (I) Ineligible
- (W) Walk-on
- Injured
- Current redshirt

Roster
Last update: December 19, 2023

== Schedule and results ==
Date time, TV	Rank^{#}	Opponent^{#}	Result	Record	High points	High rebounds	High assists	Site (attendance) city, state
Non-conference regular season
November 6, 2023*; 5:00 p.m., ESPN+		Howard	W 64–58	1–0	29 – Robertson	8 – Durant	3 – 2 tied	Charles E. Smith Center (253); Washington, D.C.
November 10, 2023*; 6:00 p.m., ESPN+		at Manhattan	W 55–49	2–0	20 – Buford	11 – Durant	4 – Durant	Draddy Gymnasium (437); Riverdale, NY
November 15, 2023*; 6:00 p.m., ESPN+		American	W 69–59	3–0	19 – Lok	8 – Durant	4 – Robertson	Charles E. Smith Center (422); Washington, D.C.
November 18, 2023*; 2:00 p.m., DSN		at Maryland Eastern Shore	L 59–62	3–1	21 – Robertson	8 – Taiwo	3 – Buford	Hytche Athletic Center (183); Princess Anne, MD
November 23, 2023*; 12:30 p.m., FloHoops		vs. West Virginia; Discover Puerto Rico Shootout	L 51–54	3–2	11 – Taiwo	10 – Taiwo	4 – Inniss	Roberto Clemente Coliseum (250); San Juan, Puerto Rico
November 24, 2023*; 12:30 p.m., FloHoops		vs. Southern Illinois; Discover Puerto Rico Shootout	L 55–66	3–3	23 – Robertson	11 – Durant	4 – Lok	Roberto Clemente Coliseum (250); San Juan, Puerto Rico
November 25, 2023*; 12:30 p.m., FloHoops		vs. Charlotte; Discover Puerto Rico Shootout	L 38–50	3–4	7 – Buford	6 – Webster	1 – 4 tied	Roberto Clemente Coliseum (250); San Juan, Puerto Rico
November 30, 2023*; 6:00 p.m., ESPN+		Cheyney	W 91–30	4–4	21 – Engel	10 – Loving	5 – Robertson	Charles E. Smith Center (251); Washington, D.C.
December 6, 2023*; 11:00 a.m., FloHoops		at Towson	L 60–68	4–5	30 – Robertson	9 – Robertson	2 – 5 tied	SECU Arena (2,112); Towson, MD
December 9, 2023*; 2:00 p.m., ESPN+		Coppin State	W 55–41	5–5	14 – Lok	8 – 2 tied	2 – 3 tied	Charles E. Smith Center (432); Washington, D.C.
December 16, 2023*; 2:00 p.m., Monumental/ESPN+		Hampton	W 46–40	6–5	17 – Brown	11 – Inniss	4 – 2 tied	Charles E. Smith Center (378); Washington, D.C.
December 21, 2023*; 11:00 a.m., ESPN+		Stonehill	W 67–34	7–5	25 – Brown	8 – 2 tied	4 – Brown	Charles E. Smith Center (304); Washington, D.C.
A–10 regular season
December 30, 2023; 12:00 p.m., Monumental/ESPN+		Richmond	L 66–70	7–6 (0–1)	25 – Robertson	7 – 2 tied	5 – Inniss	Charles E. Smith Center (284); Washington, D.C.
January 3, 2024; 7:00 p.m., ESPN+		at Saint Joseph's	L 47–67	7–7 (0–2)	16 – Lok	6 – Inniss	2 – 2 tied	Hagan Arena (461); Philadelphia, PA
January 10, 2024; 6:00 p.m., ESPN+		Duquesne	L 54–71	7–8 (0–3)	17 – Robertson	8 – Lok	4 – Taiwo	Charles E. Smith Center (202); Washington, D.C.
January 14, 2024; 1:00 p.m., ESPN+		at St. Bonaventure	W 78–62	8–8 (1–3)	31 – Robertson	9 – Brown	3 – 3 tied	Reilly Center (115); St. Bonaventure, NY
January 17, 2024; 7:00 p.m., ESPN+		at Dayton	L 53–71	8–9 (1–4)	22 – Robertson	7 – Brown	3 – 2 tied	UD Arena (1,898); Dayton, OH
January 20, 2024; 2:00 p.m., Monumental/ESPN+		Saint Louis	L 56–66	8–10 (1–5)	19 – Lok	11 – Taiwo	4 – Inniss	Charles E. Smith Center (342); Washington, D.C.
January 24, 2024; 12:00 p.m., ESPN+		George Mason; Revolutionary Rivalry	L 41–57	8–11 (1–6)	16 – Lok	9 – 2 tied	3 – 2 tied	Charles E. Smith Center (602); Washington, D.C.
January 27, 2024; 2:00 p.m., ESPN+		at Fordham	L 55–60	8–12 (1–7)	19 – Robertson	6 – Inniss	4 – Lok	Rose Hill Gymnasium (288); The Bronx, NY
January 31, 2024; 6:00 p.m., ESPN+		Rhode Island	L 52–66	8–13 (1–8)	23 – Robertson	10 – Taiwo	3 – Taiwo	Charles E. Smith Center (512); Washington, D.C.
February 4, 2024; 1:00 p.m., ESPN+		at VCU	L 51–71	8–14 (1–9)	13 – Brown	9 – Brown	2 – 2 tied	Siegel Center (624); Richmond, VA
February 7, 2024; 6:00 p.m., ESPN+		St. Bonaventure	W 69–48	9–14 (2–9)	18 – Lok	15 – Taiwo	5 – Lok	Charles E. Smith Center (328); Washington, D.C.
February 11, 2024; 1:00 p.m., ESPN+		at Richmond	L 61–83	9–15 (2–10)	14 – Brown	5 – Taiwo	4 – Lok	Robins Center (2,437); Richmond, VA
February 14, 2024; 6:00 p.m., ESPN+		La Salle	W 71–49	10–15 (3–10)	25 – Robertson	10 – Taiwo	4 – Taiwo	Charles E. Smith Center (224); Washington, D.C.
February 17, 2024; 3:00 p.m., ESPN+		at George Mason; Revolutionary Rivalry	L 57–60	10–16 (3–11)	14 – Taiwo	15 – Taiwo	3 – 2 tied	EagleBank Arena (1,891); Fairfax, VA
February 21, 2024; 11:00 a.m., ESPN+		at Duquesne	L 69–79	10–17 (3–12)	29 – Robertson	15 – Taiwo	5 – Inniss	UPMC Cooper Fieldhouse; Pittsburgh, PA
February 24, 2024; 12:00 p.m., Monumental/ESPN+		UMass	W 59–55	11–17 (4–12)	16 – Sims	20 – Taiwo	3 – 2 tied	Charles E. Smith Center (405); Washington, D.C.
February 28, 2024; 7:00 p.m., ESPN+		at Davidson	W 45–40	12–17 (5–12)	21 – Robertson	14 – Taiwo	3 – Taiwo	John M. Belk Arena (767); Davidson, NC
March 2, 2024; 2:00 p.m., Monumental/ESPN+		Loyola Chicago	W 50–43	13–17 (6–12)	16 – Robertson	11 – Taiwo	3 – Inniss	Charles E. Smith Center (475); Washington, D.C.
A–10 tournament
March 7, 2024; 5:00 p.m., ESPN+	(10)	vs. (7) Saint Louis; Second round	L 68–75	13–18	23 – Robertson	11 – Taiwo	4 – Sims	Henrico Sports & Events Center; Henrico, VA
*Non-conference game. ^{#}Rankings from AP poll. (#) Tournament seedings in parentheses. All times are in Eastern.
