= 2023–24 VCU Rams women's basketball team =

Intercollegiate basketball season

2023–24 VCU Rams women's basketball

WBIT, First round
- Conference: Atlantic 10 Conference
- Record: 26–6 (15–3 A-10)
- Head coach: Beth O'Boyle (10th season)
- Assistant coaches: Kirk Crawford; Brittany Parker; Candice M. Jackson
- Home arena: Siegel Center

2023–24 Atlantic 10 women's basketball standings
	Conf.				Overall
Team	W		L	PCT	W		L	PCT
Richmond †	16	–	2	.889	29	–	6	.829
VCU	15	–	3	.833	26	–	6	.813
Saint Joseph's	15	–	3	.833	28	–	6	.824
George Mason	14	–	4	.778	23	–	8	.742
Duquesne	13	–	5	.722	21	–	13	.618
Rhode Island	10	–	8	.556	21	–	14	.600
Saint Louis	9	–	9	.500	22	–	18	.550
Davidson*	8	–	10	.444	18	–	8	.692
Loyola Chicago	8	–	10	.444	15	–	16	.484
Fordham	8	–	10	.444	12	–	17	.414
George Washington	6	–	12	.333	13	–	18	.419
Dayton	5	–	13	.278	12	–	19	.387
La Salle	5	–	13	.278	8	–	22	.267
UMass	2	–	16	.111	5	–	27	.156
St. Bonaventure	1	–	17	.056	4	–	26	.133
† 2024 A10 tournament winner * Season cancelled on March 1, 2024.

The 2023–24 VCU Rams women's basketball team represented Virginia Commonwealth University during the 2023–24 NCAA Division I women's basketball season. It was the program's 50th season of existence, and their eleventh season in the Atlantic 10 Conference. The Rams were led by tenth-year head coach Beth O'Boyle and played their home games at the Stuart C. Siegel Center.

== Previous season ==
The 2022–23 team finished the season with a 7–22 (4–12 Atlantic 10) record. They were the 13th seed in the 2023 Atlantic 10 women's basketball tournament, where they lost to Dayton in the first round.

== Offseason ==
=== Departures ===
Name	Number	Pos.	Height	Year	Hometown	Notes
Anisja Harris	1	G	5 ft 8 in (1.73 m)	Graduate	Columbus, OH	Graduated
Janika Griffith-Wallace	2	G	5 ft 8 in (1.73 m)	RS Senior	Brampton, ON	Graduated
Chloe Bloom	13	C	6 ft 2 in (1.88 m)	RS Senior	Sydney, Australia	Graduated
Keowa Walters	32	F	6 ft 0 in (1.83 m)	Graduate	Toronto, ON	Graduated

=== Incoming transfers ===
Name	Number	Pos.	Height	Year	Hometown	Previous school
Valentina Ojeda	12	F	6 ft 0 in (1.83 m)	Junior	Punta Arenas, Chile	Transferred from Independence Community College
Natalia Tondi	14	F	5 ft 10 in (1.78 m)	Junior	Buenos Aires, Argentina	Transferred from Florida SouthWestern State

=== 2023 recruits ===
No players have officially committed to VCU.

== Roster ==
2023–24 VCU Rams women's basketball team
Players
Coaches

Pos.	#	Name	Height	Year	Previous school	Hometown
G	0	Sarah Te-Biasu	5 ft 5 in (1.65 m)	Sr	Niagara Prep	Montreal, QC
G	3	Timaya Lewis-Eutsey	5 ft 8 in (1.73 m)	So	Life Center Academy	Trenton, NJ
G	4	Grace Hutson	5 ft 9 in (1.75 m)	RS Jr	St. Joseph Central	Christiansburg, VA
G	5	Adebukola Akomolafe	5 ft 9 in (1.75 m)	RS So	Americas HS	El Paso, TX
G	11	Mary-Anna Asare	5 ft 7 in (1.7 m)	So	J. Addison School	Markham, ON
F	12	Valentina Ojeda	6 ft 0 in (1.83 m)	Jr	Independence CC	Punta Arenas, Chile
F	13	Zoli Khalil	6 ft 0 in (1.83 m)	Fr	Spotswood (VA)	Harrisonburg, VA
F	14	Natalia Tondi	5 ft 10 in (1.78 m)	Jr	Florida SouthWestern State	Buenos Aires, Argentina
G	21	Deniz Torgut	5 ft 10 in (1.78 m)	RS Fr	Botas Gelisim Ankara	İzmir, Turkey
G	22	Jennifer Ezeh	6 ft 2 in (1.88 m)	RS Sr	Missouri State	Nibo, Nigeria
F	32	Lucía Sotelo Miguez	6 ft 1 in (1.85 m)	Fr	Ensino Lugo	Ourense, Spain
F	33	Elze Motekaityte	6 ft 2 in (1.88 m)	Sr	New Hope Academy	Klaipėda, Lithuania
F	34	Mykel Parham	6 ft 1 in (1.85 m)	GS	Creighton	Burnsville, MN
F	35	Samantha Robinson	6 ft 1 in (1.85 m)	GS	Central Michigan	Bradford, ON

Head coach

- Beth O'Boyle (Gettysburg)

Assistant coach(es)

- Kirk Crawford (Western Colorado)
- Candice M. Jackson (Michigan State)
- Brittany Parker (St. Augustine's)

Legend

- (C) Team captain
- (S) Suspended
- (I) Ineligible
- (W) Walk-on
- Injured
- Current redshirt

Roster
Last update: April 6, 2024

== Schedule and results ==
Date time, TV	Rank^{#}	Opponent^{#}	Result	Record	High points	High rebounds	High assists	Site (attendance) city, state
Non-conference regular season
November 7, 2023*; 6:00 p.m., ESPN+		Hofstra	W 72–44	1–0	14 – Asare	9 – Lewis-Eutsey	4 – Te-Biasu	Siegel Center (470); Richmond, VA
November 10, 2023*; 7:00 p.m., FloSports		at William & Mary	W 70–54	2–0	27 – Te-Biasu	10 – Parham	6 – Te-Biasu	Kaplan Arena (956); Williamsburg, VA
November 14, 2023*; 6:00 p.m., ESPN+		East Carolina	W 55–50	3–0	13 – Lewis-Eutsey	10 – Parham	2 – Miguez (Note: Tied between multiple players, Lucía Sotelo Miguez recorded the fewest minutes played, therefore most assists per minute.)	Siegel Center (549); Richmond, VA
November 19, 2023*; 2:00 p.m., ESPN+		at James Madison	L 65–78	3–1	18 – Lewis-Eutsey	8 – Parham	4 – Asare	Atlantic Union Bank Center; Harrisonburg, VA
November 23, 2023*; 5:30 p.m., FloHoops		vs. St. John's; Discover Puerto Rico Classic	W 56–51	4–1	19 – Te-Biasu	9 – Parham	1 – Ezeh	José Miguel Agrelot Coliseum (250); San Juan, PR
November 24, 2023*; 5:30 p.m., FloHoops		vs. Sacred Heart; Discover Puerto Rico Classic	W 76–62	5–1	18 – Te-Biasu	14 – Parham	4 – Lewis-Eutsey	José Miguel Agrelot Coliseum (250); San Juan, PR
November 25, 2023*; 3:00 p.m., FloHoops		vs. Puerto Rico–Mayagüez; Discover Puerto Rico Classic	W 69–30	6–1	13 – Asare	7 – Robinson	3 – Te-Biasu	José Miguel Agrelot Coliseum (250); San Juan, PR
December 2, 2023*; 1:00 p.m., ESPN+		Charlotte	W 57–49	7–1	17 – Asare	8 – Ezeh	4 – Asare	Siegel Center (362); Richmond, VA
December 5, 2023*; 6:00 p.m., ESPN+		Le Moyne	W 55–32	8–1	13 – Asare	8 – Lewis-Eutsy	1 – Te-Biasu	Siegel Center (300); Richmond, VA
December 11, 2023*; 7:00 p.m., ESPN+		vs. Delaware; Henrico Sports Showcase	W 64–55	9–1	19 – Asare	10 – Ezeh	8 – Te-Biasu	Henrico Sports & Events Center (Note: Neutral site game, hosted by Henrico Sports and Entertainment Authority) (1,014); Henrico, VA
December 17, 2023*; 1:00 p.m., ESPN+		Old Dominion; Rivalry	W 64–50	10–1	13 – Te-Biasu	9 – Ezeh	2 – Torgut	Siegel Center (756); Richmond, VA
December 20, 2023*; 6:00 p.m., ESPN+		Maryland Eastern Shore	W 59–36	11–1	19 – Lewis-Eutsey	9 – Lewis-Eutsey	4 – Lewis-Eutsey	Siegel Center (421); Richmond, VA
Atlantic 10 conference regular season
December 30, 2023; 4:30 p.m., ESPN+		UMass	W 65–45	12–1 (1–0)	12 – Ezeh	11 – Parham	4 – Te-Biasu	Siegel Center (1,014); Richmond, VA
January 3, 2024; 6:00 p.m., ESPN+/Monumental		at Richmond; Capital City Classic	L 65–72	12–2 (1–1)	12 – Torgut	7 – Parham	4 – Te-Biasu	Robins Center (1,226); Richmond, VA
January 7, 2024; 2:00 p.m., CBSSN		at Davidson	W 65–55	13–2 (2–1)	21 – Lewis-Eutsey	10 – Ezeh	2 – Lewis-Eutsey	John M. Belk Arena (1,205); Davidson, NC
January 10, 2024; 6:00 p.m., ESPN+		Fordham	W 57–54	14–2 (3–1)	16 – Lewis-Eutsey	7 – Parham	3 – Te-Biasu	Siegel Center (587); Richmond, VA
January 13, 2024; 2:00 p.m., ESPN+		at Loyola Chicago	W 52–36	15–2 (4–1)	26 – Te-Biasu	8 – tied	3 – tied	Gentile Arena (325); Chicago, IL
January 20, 2024; 1:00 p.m., ESPN+		La Salle	W 66–50	16–2 (5–1)	22 – Lewis-Eutsey	11 – Lewis-Eutsey	2 – tied	Siegel Center (1,126); Richmond, VA
January 24, 2024; 11:00 a.m., ESPN+		at Dayton	W 73–62	17–2 (6–1)	22 – Te-Biasu	8 – Parham	2 – tied	UD Arena (12,097); Dayton, OH
January 28, 2024; 3:00 p.m., ESPN+		at George Mason; Rivalry	L 47–60	17–3 (6–2)	19 – Te-Biasu	9 – Lewis-Eutsey	4 – Asare	EagleBank Arena (2,048); Fairfax, VA
January 31, 2024; 11:00 a.m., ESPN+		Duquesne	W 64–51	18–3 (7–2)	26 – Te-Biasu	8 – Parham	5 – Te-Biasu	Siegel Center (5,324); Richmond, VA
February 4, 2024; 1:00 p.m., ESPN+		George Washington	W 71–51	19–3 (8–2)	15 – Lewis-Eutsey	11 – Parham	6 – Te-Biasu	Siegel Center (624); Richmond, VA
February 7, 2024; 12:00 p.m., ESPN+		at Saint Louis	W 76–67	20–3 (9–2)	24 – Lewis-Eutsey	10 – Parham	4 – Te-Biasu	Chaifetz Arena (7,459); St. Louis, MO
February 10, 2024; 1:00 p.m., ESPN+		St. Bonaventure	W 54–40	21–3 (10–2)	11 – Lewis-Eutsey	5 – tied	3 – tied	Siegel Center (432); Richmond, VA
February 14, 2024; 6:00 p.m., NBC Sports App		Richmond; Capital City Classic	L 58–65	21–4 (10–3)	25 – Te-Biasu	12 – Parham	3 – Lewis-Eutsey	Siegel Center (854); Richmond, VA
February 17, 2024; 1:00 p.m., ESPN+/NESN+		at UMass	W 63–49	22–4 (11–3)	16 – Hutson	6 – Lewis-Eutsey	4 – Robinson	Mullins Center (1,241); Amherst, MA
February 21, 2024; 6:00 p.m., ESPN+		Saint Joseph's	W 59–48	23–4 (12–3)	16 – Te-Biasu	10 – Parham	3 – Te-Biasu	Siegel Center (423); Richmond, VA
February 24, 2024; 2:00 p.m., ESPN+		at La Salle	W 75–50	24–4 (13–3)	17 – Te-Biasu	15 – Parham	3 – Lewis-Eutsey	Tom Gola Arena (436); Philadelphia, PA
February 28, 2024; 6:00 p.m., ESPN+		at Rhode Island	W 69–59	25–4 (14–3)	17 – tied	8 – Parham	2 – tied	Ryan Center (1,439); Kingston, RI
March 2, 2024; 1:00 p.m., ESPN+		George Mason; Rivalry	W 61–56	26–4 (15–3)	24 – Te-Biasu	9 – Parham	3 – Te-Biasu	Siegel Center (6,054); Richmond, VA
A-10 tournament
March 8, 2024; 5:00 p.m., ESPN+	(2)	vs. (7) Saint Louis; Quarterfinals	L 63–65	26–5	22 – Te-Biasu	10 – Parham	3 – Te-Biasu	Henrico Sports & Events Center; Henrico, VA
WBIT
March 21, 2024*; 7:00 p.m., ESPN+		at (1) Villanova; First round	L 60–75	26–6	21 – Te-Biasu	8 – Parham	2 – Te-Biasu	Finneran Pavilion (851); Villanova, PA
*Non-conference game. ^{#}Rankings from AP poll. (#) Tournament seedings in parentheses. All times are in Eastern Time.

Schedule notes

== See also ==
- 2023–24 VCU Rams men's basketball team
