= 2024 Atlantic 10 women's basketball tournament =

American college basketball postseason tournament

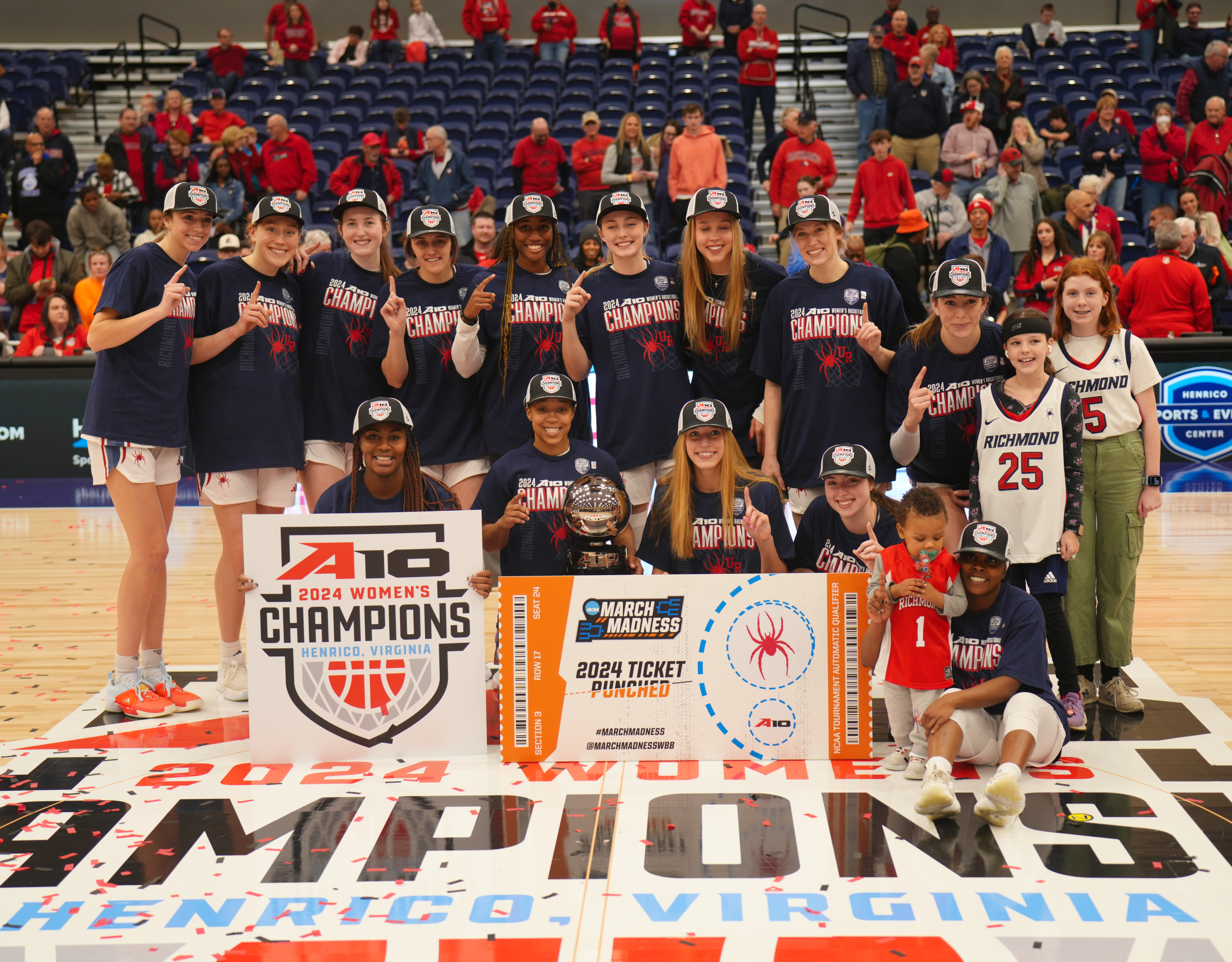
- 2024 A10 Champion Richmond Spiders
- Classification: Division I
- Season: 2023–24
- Teams: 14
- Site: Henrico Sports & Events Center; Henrico, Virginia
- Champions: Richmond (1st title)
- Winning coach: Aaron Roussell (1st title)
- MVP: Addie Budnik (Richmond)
- Attendance: 14,559
- Television: ESPN+, ESPN2, CBSSN

2023–24 Atlantic 10 women's basketball standings
	Conf.				Overall
Team	W		L	PCT	W		L	PCT
Richmond †	16	–	2	.889	29	–	6	.829
VCU	15	–	3	.833	26	–	6	.813
Saint Joseph's	15	–	3	.833	28	–	6	.824
George Mason	14	–	4	.778	23	–	8	.742
Duquesne	13	–	5	.722	21	–	13	.618
Rhode Island	10	–	8	.556	21	–	14	.600
Saint Louis	9	–	9	.500	22	–	18	.550
Davidson*	8	–	10	.444	18	–	8	.692
Loyola Chicago	8	–	10	.444	15	–	16	.484
Fordham	8	–	10	.444	12	–	17	.414
George Washington	6	–	12	.333	13	–	18	.419
Dayton	5	–	13	.278	12	–	19	.387
La Salle	5	–	13	.278	8	–	22	.267
UMass	2	–	16	.111	5	–	27	.156
St. Bonaventure	1	–	17	.056	4	–	26	.133
† 2024 A10 tournament winner * Season cancelled on March 1, 2024.

The 2024 Atlantic 10 women's basketball tournament was the postseason women's basketball tournament for the 2023–24 season of the Atlantic 10 Conference (A-10). It was held from March 6-10, 2024, in Henrico, Virginia, at Henrico Sports & Events Center. It was the 48th annual edition of the tournament.

== Seeds ==
14 A-10 schools participated in the tournament. Teams were seeded by winning percentage within the conference, with a tiebreaker system to seed teams with identical percentages. The top 10 teams received a first-round bye and the top four teams received a double-bye, automatically advancing them to the quarterfinals.

Davidson cancelled its season on March 1, 2024, citing "Significant injuries".

Seed	School	Conference Record	Tiebreaker
1	Richmond	16–2	
2	VCU	15–3	1–0 vs. Saint Joseph's
3	Saint Joseph’s	15–3	0–1 vs. VCU
4	George Mason	14–4	
5	Duquesne	13–5	
6	Rhode Island	10–8	
7	Saint Louis	9–9	
8	Loyola Chicago	8–10	1–0 vs. Fordham
9	Fordham	8–10	0–1 vs. Loyola Chicago
10	George Washington	6–12	
11	Dayton	5–13	1–0 vs. La Salle
12	La Salle	5–13	0–1 vs. Dayton
13	Massachusetts	2–16	
14	St. Bonaventure	1–17	

== Schedule ==
Session	Game	Time	Matchup	Score	Television	Attendance
First round – Wednesday, March 6
1	1	12:00 pm	No. 12 La Salle vs No. 13 Massachusetts	49–54	ESPN+	1,044
1	2	2:30 pm	No. 11 Dayton vs No. 14 St. Bonaventure	66–52	ESPN+	1,044
Second round – Thursday, March 7
2	3	11:00 am	No. 8 Loyola Chicago vs No. 9 Fordham	53–52	ESPN+	2,270
2	4	1:30 pm	No. 5 Duquesne vs No. 13 Massachusetts	81–57	ESPN+	2,270
3	5	5:00 pm	No. 7 Saint Louis vs No. 10 George Washington	75–68	ESPN+	1,188
3	6	7:30 pm	No. 6 Rhode Island vs No. 11 Dayton	70–57	ESPN+	1,188
Quarterfinals – Friday, March 8
4	7	11:00 am	No. 1 Richmond vs No. 8 Loyola Chicago	70–54	ESPN+	3,556
4	8	1:30 pm	No. 4 George Mason vs No. 5 Duquesne	62–63	ESPN+	3,556
5	9	5:00 pm	No. 2 VCU vs No. 7 Saint Louis	63–65	ESPN+	2,185
5	10	7:30 pm	No. 3 Saint Joseph’s vs No. 6 Rhode Island	47–57	ESPN+	2,185
Semifinals – Saturday, March 9
6	11	11:00 am	No. 1 Richmond vs No. 5 Duquesne	80–66	CBSSN	2,271
6	12	1:30 pm	No. 7 Saint Louis vs No. 6 Rhode Island	62–68	CBSSN	2,271
Championship – Sunday, March 10
7	13	4:00 pm	No. 1 Richmond vs No. 6 Rhode Island	65–51	ESPN2	3,089

*Game times in Eastern Time.

== Bracket ==
First round Wednesday, March 6 ESPN+
12	La Salle	49
13	Massachusetts	54
11	Dayton	66
14	St. Bonaventure	52

Second round Thursday, March 7 ESPN+
8	Loyola Chicago	53
9	Fordham	52
5	Duquesne	81
13	Massachusetts	57
7	Saint Louis	75
10	George Washington	68
6	Rhode Island	70
11	Dayton	57

Quarterfinals; Friday, March 8 ESPN+
1	Richmond	70
8	Loyola Chicago	54
4	George Mason	62
5	Duquesne	63
2	VCU	63
7	Saint Louis	65
3	Saint Joseph’s	47
6	Rhode Island	57

Semifinals; Saturday, March 9 CBSSN
1	Richmond	80
5	Duquesne	66
7	Saint Louis	62
6	Rhode Island	68

Championship; Sunday, March 10; ESPN2
1	Richmond	65
6	Rhode Island	51

== Weblinks ==
- 2024 Tournament Photo Gallery
