= Davidson Wildcats women's basketball =

2026–27 Davidson Wildcats women's basketball team
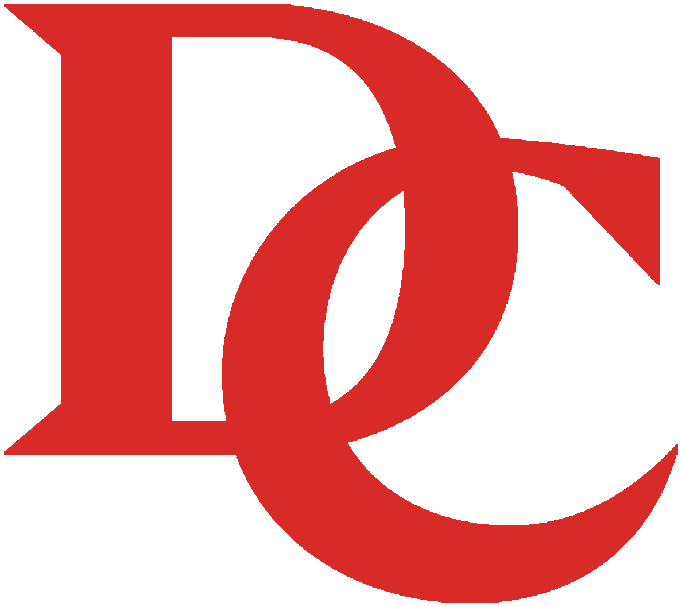
- College: Davidson College
- Head coach: Gayle Fulks (10th season)
- Location: Davidson, North Carolina
- Arena: John M. Belk Arena (capacity: 5,223)
- Conference: Atlantic 10
- Nickname: Wildcats
- Colors: Red and black
- Student section: D-Block

Conference regular-season champions
- SoCon: 2012

Uniforms
Home	Away

The Davidson Wildcats women's basketball team is the basketball team that represents Davidson College based in Davidson, North Carolina, in the NCAA Division I. The school's team currently competes in the Atlantic 10 Conference and they are coached by Gayle Fulks currently in her tenth year at the program.

== History ==
Since beginning play in 1973, the Wildcats have an all-time record (as of the end of the 2015–16 season) of 415–525, with one regular season title in 2012 when they were in the Southern Conference. The program was discontinued at the end of the 1985-86 season, and was re-started for the 1992-93 season. They have never made the NCAA tournament, but they have made appearances in the WNIT in 2007, 2012, 2013. In the latter year, they went to the Second Round for the first time ever after beating Old Dominion 82–73 before losing to Charlotte 72–60.
