= 2023–24 Towson Tigers women's basketball team =

American college basketball season

2023–24 Towson Tigers women's basketball
- Conference: Colonial Athletic Association
- Record: 20–11 (11–7 CAA)
- Head coach: Laura Harper (2nd season)
- Associate head coach: Christie Rogers
- Assistant coaches: Ka'lia Johnson; Zion Sanders
- Home arena: SECU Arena

2023–24 CAA women's basketball standings
	Conf.				Overall
Team	W		L	PCT	W		L	PCT
Stony Brook	16	–	2	.889	28	–	5	.848
Monmouth	14	–	4	.778	22	–	10	.688
Charleston	13	–	5	.722	22	–	10	.688
North Carolina A&T	13	–	5	.722	22	–	12	.647
William & Mary	12	–	6	.667	15	–	14	.517
Towson	11	–	7	.611	20	–	11	.645
Drexel †	10	–	8	.556	19	–	15	.559
Campbell	9	–	9	.500	17	–	14	.548
Elon	7	–	11	.389	11	–	21	.344
Delaware	7	–	11	.389	11	–	20	.355
Northeastern	5	–	13	.278	10	–	17	.370
Hampton	3	–	15	.167	3	–	26	.103
Hofstra	3	–	15	.167	11	–	21	.344
UNC Wilmington	3	–	15	.167	5	–	25	.167
† 2024 CAA tournament winner

The 2023–24 Towson Tigers women's basketball team represented Towson University during the 2023–24 NCAA Division I women's basketball season. The Tigers, led by second-year head coach Laura Harper, played their home games at the SECU Arena in Towson, Maryland as members of the Colonial Athletic Association (CAA). They finished the season 20–11, 11–7 in CAA play, to finish in sixth place.

== Previous season ==
The Tigers finished the 2022–23 season 21–11, 13–5 in CAA play, to finish in a three-way tie for first place. Due to tiebreakers, they received the #1 seed in the CAA tournament, where they defeated #9 seed Hampton in the quarterfinals, and #4 William & Mary, before being upset by #7 seed Monmouth in the championship game. They received an automatic bid into the WNIT, where they would lose in the first round to Harvard.

== Roster ==
2023–24 Towson Tigers women's basketball team
Players
Coaches

Pos.	#	Name	Height	Year	Previous school	Hometown
G	1	Semaya Turner	5 ft 11 in (1.8 m)	So	Saint Francis (PA)	Rockaway, NJ
G	2	India Johnston	5 ft 8 in (1.73 m)	So	Caravel Academy	Bear, DE
F	3	Anasia Staton	6 ft 0 in (1.83 m)	Jr	CCBC Essex	Jersey City, NJ
F	5	Kayla Morris	6 ft 2 in (1.88 m)	RS So	Cal State Bakersfield	Harlem, NY
F	10	Caydence Hadley	6 ft 1 in (1.85 m)	Fr	Bishop Kearney High School	Rochester, NY
G	11	Alina Sendar	6 ft 0 in (1.83 m)	Jr	Georgia	Amsterdam, Netherlands
G	13	Alexia Nelson	5 ft 7 in (1.7 m)	Sr	UMBC	Brooklyn, NY
G	14	Aminata Diakite	5 ft 8 in (1.73 m)	RS Jr	Salt Lake Community College	Bamako, Mali
G	15	Kylie Kornegay-Lucas	5 ft 10 in (1.78 m)	RS Sr	Virginia	Camden, DE
G	20	Mariah Wilson	5 ft 10 in (1.78 m)	Jr	Lancaster Mennonite School	Lancaster, PA
F	21	Gabby Scott	6 ft 0 in (1.83 m)	So	Howard High School	Ellicott City, MD
F	22	Anaiah Jenkins	5 ft 11 in (1.8 m)	Fr	McDonogh School	Odenton, MD
G	24	Patricia Anumgba	5 ft 7 in (1.7 m)	Jr	CCBC Essex	Silver Spring, MD
C	30	Taiye Johnson	6 ft 5 in (1.96 m)	GS	Radford	Richmond, VA
F	34	Quinzia Fulmore	6 ft 3 in (1.91 m)	Jr	Dudley High School	Greensboro, NC

Head coach

- Laura Harper (Maryland)

Assistant coach(es)

- Christie Rogers (Washington College)
- Ka'lia Johnson (Duke)
- Zion Sanders (Iowa)

Legend

- (C) Team captain
- (S) Suspended
- (I) Ineligible
- (W) Walk-on
- Injured
- Current redshirt

Roster
Last update: January 23, 2024

== Schedule and results ==
Date time, TV	Rank^{#}	Opponent^{#}	Result	Record	High points	High rebounds	High assists	Site (attendance) city, state
Exhibition
October 30, 2023*; 7:00 p.m.		Frostburg State	W 97–66	—	23 – Kornegay-Lucas	11 – Fulmore	6 – Kornegay-Lucas	SECU Arena (183); Towson, MD
Non-conference regular season
November 6, 2023*; 7:00 p.m., FloHoops		UMBC	W 76–72	1–0	15 – Nelson	8 – Scott	3 – 3 tied	SECU Arena (585); Towson, MD
November 16, 2023*; 7:00 p.m., ESPN+		at Columbia	L 57–80	1–1	15 – Kornegay-Lucas	9 – Kornegay-Lucas	4 – 2 tied	Levien Gymnasium (524); New York, NY
November 21, 2023*; 7:00 p.m., FloHoops		Maryland Eastern Shore	Suspended at halftime due to a roof issue, with Maryland Eastern Shore leading 21–19					SECU Arena; Towson, MD
November 25, 2023*; 3:30 p.m.		vs. Abilene Christian; The Navy Classic	W 63–56	2–1	15 – Kornegay-Lucas	9 – Kornegay-Lucas	6 – Kornegay-Lucas	Alumni Hall (170); Annapolis, MD
November 26, 2023*; 3:30 p.m.		vs. Quinnipiac; The Navy Classic	W 75–65	3–1	19 – 2 tied	9 – Kornegay-Lucas	6 – Nelson	Alumni Hall (167); Annapolis, MD
November 29, 2023*; 7:00 p.m., FloHoops		Morgan State	W 80–69	4–1	24 – Kornegay-Lucas	11 – Fulmore	7 – Kornegay-Lucas	SECU Arena (614); Towson, MD
December 4, 2023*; 7:00 p.m., ESPN+		at Liberty	W 73–70 ^{OT}	5–1	21 – Anumgba	10 – Fulmore	4 – Kornegay-Lucas	Liberty Arena (760); Lynchburg, VA
December 6, 2023*; 11:00 a.m., Monumental/FloHoops		George Washington	W 68–60	6–1	24 – Johnston	9 – Kornegay-Lucas	4 – Kornegay-Lucas	SECU Arena (2,112); Towson, MD
December 10, 2023*; 2:00 p.m., ESPN+		at American	W 68–60	7–1	17 – Anumgba	10 – 2 tied	4 – 2 tied	Bender Arena (379); Washington, D.C.
December 12, 2023*; 11:00 a.m., B1G+		at Maryland	L 51–99	7–2	15 – Anumgba	10 – Kornegay-Lucas	3 – Nelson	Xfinity Center (14,994); College Park, MD
December 22, 2023*; 12:00 p.m., Monumental/FloHoops		George Mason	L 76–83	7–3	22 – Kornegay-Lucas	14 – Kornegay-Lucas	8 – Kornegay-Lucas	SECU Arena (515); Towson, MD
CAA regular season
January 5, 2024; 7:00 p.m., FloHoops		at Elon	W 58–53	8–3 (1–0)	15 – Anumgba	9 – Kornegay-Lucas	2 – Kornegay-Lucas	Schar Center (601); Elon, NC
January 7, 2024; 2:00 p.m., FloHoops		at North Carolina A&T	L 52–62 ^{OT}	8–4 (1–1)	23 – Kornegay-Lucas	9 – Kornegay-Lucas	3 – Nelson	Corbett Sports Center (653); Greensboro, NC
January 12, 2024; 7:00 p.m., FloHoops		Stony Brook	L 65–77	8–5 (1–2)	17 – Kornegay-Lucas	8 – Kornegay-Lucas	6 – Kornegay-Lucas	SECU Arena (789); Towson, MD
January 14, 2024; 2:00 p.m., FloHoops		at Campbell	L 59–69	8–6 (1–3)	21 – Anumgba	6 – 2 tied	7 – Kornegay-Lucas	Gore Arena (1,114); Buies Creek, NC
January 19, 2024; 7:00 p.m., FloHoops		Hampton	W 83–53	9–6 (2–3)	28 – Anumgba	10 – Kornegay-Lucas	5 – Kornegay-Lucas	SECU Arena (224); Towson, MD
January 21, 2024; 2:00 p.m., Monumental/FloHoops		William & Mary	W 80–64	10–6 (3–3)	25 – Anumgba	15 – Morris	3 – 4 tied	SECU Arena (602); Towson, MD
January 24, 2024*; 6:00 p.m., FloHoops		Maryland Eastern Shore; Continuation from November 21	W 60–55	11–6	16 – Johnston	8 – Kornegay-Lucas	3 – 3 tied	SECU Arena (404); Towson, MD
January 28, 2024; 2:00 p.m., FloHoops		at Delaware	L 59–73	11–7 (3–4)	14 – Anumgba	10 – Kornegay-Lucas	4 – Johnston	Bob Carpenter Center (1,284); Newark, DE
February 2, 2024; 7:00 p.m., FloHoops		at Monmouth	L 53–64	11–8 (3–5)	13 – Nelson	4 – Kornegay-Lucas	2 – 2 tied	OceanFirst Bank Center (870); West Long Branch, NJ
February 4, 2024; 1:00 p.m., FloHoops		Charleston	W 66–59	12–8 (4–5)	20 – Kornegay-Lucas	11 – Staton	3 – Kornegay-Lucas	SECU Arena (1,550); Towson, MD
February 9, 2024; 6:31 p.m., FloHoops		at Stony Brook	W 83–78 ^{OT}	13–8 (5–5)	25 – Kornegay-Lucas	7 – Staton	4 – Anumgba	Island Federal Arena (1,050); Stony Brook, NY
February 11, 2024; 2:00 p.m., FloHoops		Hofstra	L 44–58	13–9 (5–6)	14 – Morris	10 – Morris	3 – 2 tied	SECU Arena (405); Towson, MD
February 16, 2024; 7:00 p.m., Monumental/FloHoops		Drexel	W 51–48 ^{OT}	14–9 (6–6)	17 – Kornegay-Lucas	14 – Kornegay-Lucas	2 – Nelson	SECU Arena (765); Towson, MD
February 23, 2024; 7:00 p.m., FloHoops		at Hampton	W 78–65	15–9 (7–6)	19 – Nelson	9 – Fulmore	7 – Nelson	Hampton Convocation Center (1,365); Hampton, VA
February 25, 2024; 2:00 p.m., Monumental/FloHoops		Delaware	W 70–57	16–9 (8–6)	15 – Kornegay-Lucas	12 – Kornegay-Lucas	7 – Anumgba	SECU Arena (715); Towson, MD
March 1, 2024; 7:00 p.m., FloHoops		at Charleston	W 67–55	17–9 (9–6)	22 – Anumgba	8 – 3 tied	6 – Nelson	TD Arena (312); Charleston, SC
March 3, 2024; 1:00 p.m., FloHoops		at UNC Wilmington	W 78–56	18–9 (10–6)	16 – Nelson	8 – Jenkins	5 – Anumgba	Trask Coliseum (560); Wilmington, NC
March 7, 2024; 7:00 p.m., FloHoops		Monmouth	L 64–70	18–10 (10–7)	17 – Anumgba	6 – Kornegay-Lucas	4 – Nelson	SECU Arena (825); Towson, MD
March 9, 2024; 2:30 p.m., FloHoops		Northeastern	W 2–0 (Note: Forfeited due to limited roster availability for Northeastern)	18–10 (11–7)	–	–	–	SECU Arena; Towson, MD
CAA tournament
March 14, 2024; 7:30 p.m., FloHoops	(6)	vs. (11) Northeastern; Second round	W 78–69	19–10	15 – Quéliz	7 – Fulmore	4 – 2 tied	Entertainment and Sports Arena (650); Washington, D.C.
March 15, 2024; 7:30 p.m., FloHoops	(6)	vs. (3) Charleston; Quarterfinals	W 69–60	20–10	16 – Staton	16 – Kornegay-Lucas	5 – Kornegay-Lucas	Entertainment and Sports Arena (900); Washington, D.C.
March 16, 2024; 4:30 p.m., FloHoops	(6)	vs. (7) Drexel; Semifinals	L 68–69	20–11	20 – Anumgba	5 – 2 tied	3 – Kornegay-Lucas	Entertainment and Sports Arena (875); Washington, D.C.
*Non-conference game. ^{#}Rankings from AP poll. (#) Tournament seedings in parentheses. All times are in Eastern.
