= 2023–24 Hofstra Pride women's basketball team =

American college basketball season

2023–24 Hofstra Pride women's basketball
- Conference: Coastal Athletic Association
- Record: 11–21 (3–15 CAA)
- Head coach: Danielle Santos Atkinson (5th season)
- Assistant coaches: Aaron Swinson; Michael Morgan; Jessica Bogia
- Home arena: Mack Sports Complex

2023–24 CAA women's basketball standings
	Conf.				Overall
Team	W		L	PCT	W		L	PCT
Stony Brook	16	–	2	.889	28	–	5	.848
Monmouth	14	–	4	.778	22	–	10	.688
Charleston	13	–	5	.722	22	–	10	.688
North Carolina A&T	13	–	5	.722	22	–	12	.647
William & Mary	12	–	6	.667	15	–	14	.517
Towson	11	–	7	.611	20	–	11	.645
Drexel †	10	–	8	.556	19	–	15	.559
Campbell	9	–	9	.500	17	–	14	.548
Elon	7	–	11	.389	11	–	21	.344
Delaware	7	–	11	.389	11	–	20	.355
Northeastern	5	–	13	.278	10	–	17	.370
Hampton	3	–	15	.167	3	–	26	.103
Hofstra	3	–	15	.167	11	–	21	.344
UNC Wilmington	3	–	15	.167	5	–	25	.167
† 2024 CAA tournament winner

The 2023–24 Hofstra Pride women's basketball team represented Hofstra University during the 2023–24 NCAA Division I women's basketball season. The Pride, led by fifth-year head coach Danielle Santos Atkinson, played their home games at the Mack Sports Complex in Hempstead, New York, as members of the Coastal Athletic Association (CAA).

== Previous season ==
The Pride finished the 2022–23 season 12–20, 4–14 in CAA play, to finish in 12th place. As the #12 seed in the CAA tournament, they defeated #13 seed UNC Wilmington in the first round, and upset #5 seed North Carolina A&T in the second round, before falling to #4 seed William & Mary in the quarterfinals.

== Roster ==
2023–24 Hofstra Pride women's basketball team
Players
Coaches

Pos.	#	Name	Height	Year	Previous school	Hometown
F	0	Brooke Anya	6 ft 0 in (1.83 m)	Sr	Longwood	Washington, D.C.
G	2	Emma Von Essen	5 ft 9 in (1.75 m)	So	Long Island Lutheran High School	Rockville Centre, New York
G	3	Sorelle Ineza	5 ft 7 in (1.7 m)	GS	Dawson College	Longueuil, Quebec
F	4	Kayley Joseph-Bernard	6 ft 0 in (1.83 m)	So	King's Christian Collegiate	Milton, Ontario
PG	10	Alarice Gooden	5 ft 7 in (1.7 m)	So	J. Addison School	Brampton, Ontario
G	11	Tionna Baker	5 ft 6 in (1.68 m)	Jr	Cleveland State Community College	Rocky Face, Georgia
C	13	Zyheima Swint	6 ft 3 in (1.91 m)	Sr	University High School	Newark, New Jersey
G	15	Janaia Fargo	5 ft 8 in (1.73 m)	Sr	Charleston Southern	Inwood, West Virginia
F	20	Ja'Miyah Bryant	6 ft 1 in (1.85 m)	Jr	Pensacola State College	Pensacola, Florida
G	22	Ally Knights	5 ft 6 in (1.68 m)	Sr	North Florida	Geelong, Australia
G	23	Onna Brown	5 ft 11 in (1.8 m)	Fr	Benson Polytechnic High School	Portland, Oregon
G	24	Maniya Custis	5 ft 3 in (1.6 m)	Sr	UCF	Camden, New Jersey
G	25	Micaela Carter	5 ft 6 in (1.68 m)	Fr	St. Mary Catholic Secondary School	Brampton, Ontario
G	33	Selma Markisic	5 ft 6 in (1.68 m)	RS Jr	Xaverian High School	Brooklyn, New York

Head coach

- Danielle Santos Atkinson (Florida)

Assistant coach(es)

- Aaron Swinson (Auburn)
- Michael Morgan (Trinity College)
- Jessica Bogia (Lafayette)

Legend

- (C) Team captain
- (S) Suspended
- (I) Ineligible
- (W) Walk-on
- Injured
- Current redshirt

Roster
Last update: January 26, 2024

== Schedule and results ==
Date time, TV	Rank^{#}	Opponent^{#}	Result	Record	High points	High rebounds	High assists	Site (attendance) city, state
Non-conference regular season
November 7, 2023*; 6:00 p.m., ESPN+		at VCU	L 44–72	0–1	14 – Ineza	7 – Swint	3 – Knights	Siegel Center (470); Richmond, VA
November 12, 2023*; 2:00 p.m., FloHoops		Wagner	W 51–48 ^{OT}	1–1	10 – 3 tied	21 – Swint	5 – Knights	Mack Sports Complex (407); Hempstead, NY
November 15, 2023*; 11:30 a.m., FloHoops		Delaware State	W 66–53	2–1	14 – Von Essen	8 – Swint	6 – Knights	Mack Sports Complex (1,462); Hempstead, NY
November 19, 2023*; 2:00 p.m., NEC Front Row		at Sacred Heart	L 60–63	2–2	20 – Ineza	12 – Swint	4 – Knights	William H. Pitt Center (683); Fairfield, CT
November 25, 2023*; 2:00 p.m., FloHoops		NJIT	W 67–65	3–2	19 – Ineza	8 – Anya	6 – Knights	Mack Sports Complex (369); Hempstead, NY
November 28, 2023*; 5:00 p.m., ESPN+		at Army	W 54–43	4–2	11 – Von Essen	9 – Anya	2 – Knights	Christl Arena (125); West Point, NY
December 3, 2023*; 2:00 p.m., FloHoops		Lehigh	L 56–68	4–3	18 – Von Essen	8 – Anya	2 – 2 tied	Mack Sports Complex (429); Hempstead, NY
December 7, 2023*; 7:00 p.m., FloHoops		Iona	L 54–59	4–4	14 – Swint	14 – Swint	5 – Knights	Mack Sports Complex (343); Hempstead, NY
December 16, 2023*; 5:00 p.m., FloHoops		Farmingdale State	W 113–24	5–4	29 – Von Essen	9 – Baker	10 – Knights	Mack Sports Complex (351); Hempstead, NY
December 21, 2023*; 12:00 p.m.		at Howard	W 58–49	6–4	18 – Von Essen	13 – Anya	4 – 2 tied	Burr Gymnasium (654); Washington, D.C.
December 31, 2023*; 1:00 p.m., FloHoops		Manhattan	L 45–53	6–5	12 – Swint	10 – Swint	7 – Knights	Mack Sports Complex (394); Hempstead, NY
CAA regular season
January 5, 2024; 7:00 p.m., FloHoops		UNC Wilmington	W 82–54	7–5 (1–0)	17 – Ineza	11 – Anya	4 – 2 tied	Mack Sports Complex (489); Hempstead, NY
January 7, 2024; 2:00 p.m., FloHoops		William & Mary	L 46–48	7–6 (1–1)	9 – Von Essen	9 – Anya	3 – Joseph-Bernard	Mack Sports Complex (301); Hempstead, NY
January 14, 2024; 2:00 p.m., FloHoops		at Northeastern	L 53–66	7–7 (1–2)	10 – Von Essen	5 – Anya	3 – Anya	Cabot Center (271); Boston, MA
January 19, 2024; 6:00 p.m., FloHoops		at Drexel	L 38–56	7–8 (1–3)	11 – 2 tied	8 – Swint	3 – Knights	Daskalakis Athletic Center (354); Philadelphia, PA
January 21, 2024; 2:00 p.m., FloHoops		Elon	L 54–55	7–9 (1–4)	23 – Von Essen	10 – Swint	5 – Knights	Mack Sports Complex (1,007); Hempstead, NY
January 26, 2024; 7:00 p.m., FloHoops		at William & Mary	L 50–61	7–10 (1–5)	13 – Von Essen	8 – Anya	3 – Carter	Kaplan Arena (962); Williamsburg, VA
January 28, 2024; 2:00 p.m., FloHoops		at Hampton	L 62–67	7–11 (1–6)	18 – Von Essen	12 – Swint	2 – 2 tied	Hampton Convocation Center (872); Hampton, VA
February 2, 2024; 7:00 p.m., FloHoops/MSG		Stony Brook; Battle of Long Island	L 49–67	7–12 (1–7)	12 – Ineza	8 – Swint	2 – Anya	Mack Sports Complex (723); Hempstead, NY
February 4, 2024; 2:00 p.m., FloHoops/MSG		Delaware	L 59–82	7–13 (1–8)	19 – Von Essen	6 – Anya	6 – Knights	Mack Sports Complex (603); Hempstead, NY
February 11, 2024; 2:00 p.m., FloHoops		at Towson	W 58–44	8–13 (2–8)	13 – Ineza	11 – Swint	2 – 3 tied	SECU Arena (405); Towson, MD
February 16, 2024; 6:31 p.m., FloHoops		at Stony Brook; Battle of Long Island	L 48–81	8–14 (2–9)	11 – Swint	6 – Anya	2 – 2 tied	Island Federal Arena (1,341); Stony Brook, NY
February 18, 2024; 2:00 p.m., FloHoops/MSG		Northeastern	W 66–46	9–14 (3–9)	22 – Von Essen	7 – 2 tied	5 – Knights	Mack Sports Complex (768); Hempstead, NY
February 23, 2024; 7:00 p.m., FloHoops/MSG		Charleston	L 59–88	9–15 (3–10)	15 – Ineza	7 – Anya	6 – Knights	Mack Sports Complex (519); Hempstead, NY
February 25, 2024; 2:00 p.m., FloHoops		at Campbell	L 51–65	9–16 (3–11)	15 – Swint	8 – Swint	4 – Anya	Gore Arena (1,047); Buies Creek, NC
March 1, 2024; 7:00 p.m., FloHoops		Hampton	L 42–48	9–17 (3–12)	13 – Ineza	12 – Swint	3 – Knights	Mack Sports Complex (354); Hempstead, NY
March 3, 2024; 2:00 p.m., FloHoops		Monmouth	L 50–66	9–18 (3–13)	7 – Anya	9 – Anya	2 – Fargo	Mack Sports Complex (546); Hempstead, NY
March 7, 2024; 7:00 p.m., FloHoops		at Elon	L 62–74	9–19 (3–14)	19 – Anya	8 – Baker	4 – 2 tied	Schar Center (812); Elon, NC
March 9, 2024; 2:00 p.m., FloHoops		at North Carolina A&T	L 46–57	9–20 (3–15)	9 – 3 tied	9 – Knights	5 – Knights	Corbett Sports Center (808); Greensboro, NC
CAA tournament
March 13, 2024; 2:30 p.m., FloHoops	(13)	vs. (12) Hampton; First round	W 71–55	10–20	19 – Gooden	13 – Swint	8 – Knights	Entertainment and Sports Arena; Washington, D.C.
March 14, 2024; 2:30 p.m., FloHoops	(13)	vs. (5) William & Mary; Second round	W 57–53	11–20	11 – 2 tied	14 – Swint	5 – Knights	Entertainment and Sports Arena; Washington, D.C.
March 15, 2024; 2:30 p.m., FloHoops	(13)	vs. (4) North Carolina A&T; Quarterfinals	L 40–55	11–21	10 – Swint	11 – Anya	2 – 2 tied	Entertainment and Sports Arena; Washington, D.C.
*Non-conference game. ^{#}Rankings from AP poll. (#) Tournament seedings in parentheses. All times are in Eastern.
