= 2023–24 William & Mary Tribe women's basketball team =

American college basketball season

2023–24 William & Mary Tribe women's basketball
- Conference: Coastal Athletic Association
- Record: 15–14 (12–6 CAA)
- Head coach: Erin Dickerson Davis (2nd season)
- Assistant coaches: Dane Sparrow; Sugar Rodgers; Kenia Cole
- Home arena: Kaplan Arena

2023–24 CAA women's basketball standings
	Conf.				Overall
Team	W		L	PCT	W		L	PCT
Stony Brook	16	–	2	.889	28	–	5	.848
Monmouth	14	–	4	.778	22	–	10	.688
Charleston	13	–	5	.722	22	–	10	.688
North Carolina A&T	13	–	5	.722	22	–	12	.647
William & Mary	12	–	6	.667	15	–	14	.517
Towson	11	–	7	.611	20	–	11	.645
Drexel †	10	–	8	.556	19	–	15	.559
Campbell	9	–	9	.500	17	–	14	.548
Elon	7	–	11	.389	11	–	21	.344
Delaware	7	–	11	.389	11	–	20	.355
Northeastern	5	–	13	.278	10	–	17	.370
Hampton	3	–	15	.167	3	–	26	.103
Hofstra	3	–	15	.167	11	–	21	.344
UNC Wilmington	3	–	15	.167	5	–	25	.167
† 2024 CAA tournament winner

The 2023–24 William & Mary Tribe women's basketball team represented the College of William & Mary during the 2023–24 NCAA Division I women's basketball season. The Tribe, led by second-year head coach Erin Dickerson Davis, played their home games at Kaplan Arena in Williamsburg, Virginia as members of the Coastal Athletic Association.

== Previous season ==
The Tribe finished the 2022–23 season 18–13, 12–6 in CAA play to finish in a tie for fourth place. As the #4 seed in the CAA tournament, they defeated #12 seed Hofstra in the quarterfinals, before falling to top-seeded Towson in the semifinals.

== Roster ==
2023–24 William & Mary Tribe women's basketball team
Players
Coaches

Pos.	#	Name	Height	Year	Previous school	Hometown
G	0	Alexa Mikeska	5 ft 8 in (1.73 m)	So	Carlsbad High School	Carlsbad, California
G	1	Cassidy Geddes	5 ft 7 in (1.7 m)	Fr	Newton-Conover High School	Hickory, North Carolina
PG	2	Monet Dance	5 ft 3 in (1.6 m)	Fr	Mount Pisgah Christian School	Roswell, Georgia
C	3	Kayla Beckwith	6 ft 1 in (1.85 m)	Sr	Bullis School	Laurel, Maryland
G	4	Lanni Brown	5 ft 9 in (1.75 m)	Sr	Wesleyan School	Suwanee, Georgia
G	5	Bella Nascimento	5 ft 8 in (1.73 m)	Jr	Manhattan	Grafton, Massachusetts
F/C	10	Dani McTeer	6 ft 0 in (1.83 m)	So	Hampton	Hampton, Virginia
G	12	Ruthie Montella	6 ft 0 in (1.83 m)	Jr	William Fremd High School	Palatine, Illinois
F	14	Rebekah Frisby-Smith	5 ft 11 in (1.8 m)	RS Sr	Forestville Eagles	Adelaide, South Australia
F	20	Nylah Young	5 ft 11 in (1.8 m)	GS	Hampton	Suffolk, Virginia
F	23	Kayla Rolph	6 ft 2 in (1.88 m)	So	Potomac School	Great Falls, Virginia
F	24	Cate Carlson	5 ft 10 in (1.78 m)	Fr	Catholic High School	Virginia Beach, Virginia
F/C	31	Madison Magee	6 ft 1 in (1.85 m)	Jr	Valley Vista High School	Phoenix, Arizona
F	35	Anahi-Lee Cauley	6 ft 0 in (1.83 m)	Jr	Villanova	Windsor, Connecticut

Head coach

- Erin Dickerson Davis (Northwestern)

Assistant coach(es)

- Dane Sparrow (UNC Greensboro)
- Sugar Rodgers (Georgetown)
- Kenia Cole (Hampton)

Legend

- (C) Team captain
- (S) Suspended
- (I) Ineligible
- (W) Walk-on
- Injured
- Current redshirt

Roster
Last update: January 20, 2024

== Schedule and results ==
Date time, TV	Rank^{#}	Opponent^{#}	Result	Record	High points	High rebounds	High assists	Site (attendance) city, state
Non-conference regular season
November 6, 2023*; 5:00 pm, FloHoops		Norfolk State	L 64–66	0–1	29 – Young	9 – 2 Tied	4 – Nascimento	Kaplan Arena (3,112); Williamsburg, VA
November 10, 2023*; 7:00 pm, FloHoops		VCU	L 54–70	0–2	26 – Young	6 – Young	4 – 2 Tied	Kaplan Arena (956); Williamsburg, VA
November 12, 2023*; 1:00 pm, FloHoops		George Mason	L 72–77	0–3	23 – Young	10 – Young	6 – Nascimento	Kaplan Arena (962); Williamsburg, VA
November 15, 2023*; 7:00 pm, ACCNX		at Virginia	L 51–80	0–4	14 – Geddes	10 – Beckwith	4 – Mikeska	John Paul Jones Arena (3,588); Charlottesville, VA
November 24, 2023*; 2:00 pm		vs. Tennessee State; FIU Thanksgiving Classic semifinals	W 63–53	1–4	21 – Young	8 – Rolph	5 – Geddes	Ocean Bank Convocation Center (391); Miami, FL
November 26, 2023*; 2:00 pm, ESPN+		at FIU; FIU Thanksgiving Classic championship	W 59–57	2–4	17 – Nascimento	6 – Young	4 – Rolph	Ocean Bank Convocation Center (389); Miami, FL
November 30, 2023*; 7:00 pm, FloHoops		Old Dominion; Rivalry	L 66–72	2–5	20 – Nascimento	6 – Young	5 – Geddes	Kaplan Arena (829); Williamsburg, VA
December 3, 2023*; 11:00 am, ESPN+		at Navy	W 81–53	3–5	14 – Nascimento	6 – Rolph	5 – Nascimento	Alumni Hall; Annapolis, MD
December 7, 2023*; 7:00 pm, ESPN+		at James Madison	L 56–75	3–6	12 – Nascimento	5 – Rolph	4 – Mikeska	Atlantic Union Bank Center (2,441); Harrisonburg, VA
December 17, 2023*; 1:00 pm, FloHoops		Longwood	W 86–49	4–6	20 – Young	7 – Frisby-Smith	6 – Frisby-Smith	Kaplan Arena (1,096); Williamsburg, VA
December 21, 2023*; 2:00 pm, ACCNX		at No. 15 Virginia Tech	L 43–76	4–7	22 – Nascimento	6 – Beckwith	3 – Mikeska	Cassell Coliseum (4,887); Blacksburg, VA
CAA regular season
January 5, 2024; 7:00 pm, FloHoops		at Monmouth	W 70–66	5–7 (1–0)	22 – Cauley	7 – Beckwith	3 – 3 Tied	OceanFirst Bank Center (680); West Long Branch, NJ
January 7, 2024; 2:00 pm, FloHoops/MSG		at Hofstra	W 48–46	6–7 (2–0)	14 – Geddes	11 – Mikeska	2 – 2 Tied	Mack Sports Complex (301); Hempstead, NY
January 12, 2024; 7:00 pm, FloHoops		North Carolina A&T	L 51–53	6–8 (2–1)	14 – Nascimento	9 – Mikeska	4 – Frisby-Smith	Kaplan Arena (855); Williamsburg, VA
January 14, 2024; 1:00 pm, FloHoops		at Elon	W 62–43	7–8 (3–1)	21 – Nascimento	10 – Nascimento	4 – Cauley	Schar Center (753); Elon, NC
January 19, 2024; 7:00 pm, FloHoops		Delaware	W 78–72 ^{OT}	8–8 (4–1)	20 – Geddes	10 – 2 Tied	5 – Geddes	Kaplan Arena (456); Williamsburg, VA
January 21, 2024; 2:00 pm, Monumental/FloHoops		at Towson	L 64–80	8–9 (4–2)	21 – Nascimento	3 – 4 Tied	3 – Geddes	SECU Arena (602); Towson, MD
January 26, 2024; 7:00 pm, FloHoops		Hofstra	W 61–50	9–9 (5–2)	22 – Geddes	8 – Beckwith	3 – 2 Tied	Kaplan Arena (962); Williamsburg, VA
January 28, 2024; 1:00 pm, FloHoops		Monmouth	L 56–67	9–10 (5–3)	19 – Nascimento	5 – Frisby-Smith	5 – Nascimento	Kaplan Arena (1,354); Williamsburg, VA
February 4, 2024; 1:00 pm, FloHoops		Drexel	W 75–62	10–10 (6–3)	27 – Young	7 – 2 Tied	5 – Dance	Kaplan Arena (1,163); Williamsburg, VA
February 9, 2024; 7:00 pm, FloHoops		at Delaware	W 62–58	11–10 (7–3)	20 – Geddes	7 – Cauley	5 – Cauley	Bob Carpenter Center (1,443); Newark, DE
February 11, 2024; 2:00 pm, FloHoops		at Hampton	W 65–55	12–10 (8–3)	19 – Geddes	9 – Young	5 – Geddes	Hampton Convocation Center (668); Hampton, VA
February 18, 2024; 2:00 pm, FloHoops		at Campbell	L 46–57	12–11 (8–4)	20 – Young	6 – Frisby-Smith	3 – 2 Tied	Gore Arena (1,002); Buies Creek, NC
February 23, 2024; 7:00 pm, FloHoops		Elon	W 73–61	13–11 (9–4)	18 – 2 Tied	7 – Young	5 – Frisby-Smith	Kaplan Arena (1,088); Williamsburg, VA
February 25, 2024; 1:00 pm, FloHoops		Hampton	W 66–58	14–11 (10–4)	24 – Young	10 – Young	4 – Mikeska	Kaplan Arena (1,291); Williamsburg, VA
March 1, 2024; 7:00 pm, FloHoops		at UNC Wilmington	W 68–50	15–11 (11–4)	15 – Cauley	9 – Rolph	4 – Nascimento	Trask Coliseum (607); Wilmington, NC
March 3, 2024; 2:00 pm, FloHoops		at Charleston	L 72–77	15–12 (11–5)	32 – Young	10 – 2 Tied	5 – Geddes	TD Arena (358); Charleston, SC
March 7, 2024; 7:00 pm, FloHoops		Northeastern	W 2–0 (Note: Forfeited due to limited roster availability for Northeastern)	15–12 (12–5)	–	–	–	Kaplan Arena; Williamsburg, VA
March 9, 2024; 1:00 pm, FloHoops		Stony Brook	L 68–74	15–13 (12–6)	24 – Nascimento	9 – Mikeska	3 – 2 Tied	Kaplan Arena (1,032); Williamsburg, VA
CAA tournament
March 14, 2024; 2:30 pm, FloHoops	(5)	vs. (13) Hofstra; Second Round	L 53–57	15–14	22 – Young	10 – Young	4 – Cauley	Entertainment and Sports Arena; Washington, D.C.
*Non-conference game. ^{#}Rankings from AP Poll. (#) Tournament seedings in parentheses. All times are in Eastern.
