= 2023–24 UNC Wilmington Seahawks women's basketball team =

American college basketball season

2023–24 UNC Wilmington Seahawks women's basketball
- Conference: Coastal Athletic Association
- Record: 5–25 (3–15 CAA)
- Head coach: Nicole Woods (1st season)
- Associate head coach: Cherie Lea
- Assistant coaches: Keyana Brown; Hailey Yohn
- Home arena: Trask Coliseum

2023–24 CAA women's basketball standings
	Conf.				Overall
Team	W		L	PCT	W		L	PCT
Stony Brook	16	–	2	.889	28	–	5	.848
Monmouth	14	–	4	.778	22	–	10	.688
Charleston	13	–	5	.722	22	–	10	.688
North Carolina A&T	13	–	5	.722	22	–	12	.647
William & Mary	12	–	6	.667	15	–	14	.517
Towson	11	–	7	.611	20	–	11	.645
Drexel †	10	–	8	.556	19	–	15	.559
Campbell	9	–	9	.500	17	–	14	.548
Elon	7	–	11	.389	11	–	21	.344
Delaware	7	–	11	.389	11	–	20	.355
Northeastern	5	–	13	.278	10	–	17	.370
Hampton	3	–	15	.167	3	–	26	.103
Hofstra	3	–	15	.167	11	–	21	.344
UNC Wilmington	3	–	15	.167	5	–	25	.167
† 2024 CAA tournament winner

The 2023–24 UNC Wilmington Seahawks women's basketball team represented the University of North Carolina Wilmington during the 2023–24 NCAA Division I women's basketball season. The Seahawks, led by first-year head coach Nicole Woods, played their home games at Trask Coliseum in Wilmington, North Carolina as members of the Coastal Athletic Association (CAA).

== Previous season ==
The Seahawks finished the 2022–23 season 5–25, 2–16 in CAA play, to finish in last (13th) place. As the #13 seed in the CAA tournament, they were defeated by #12 seed Hofstra in the first round.

After being led by interim head coach Tina Martin for the entirety of the 2022–23 season, on April 17, 2023, the school named Charlotte associate head coach Nicole Woods the team's new head coach.

== Roster ==
2023–24 UNC Wilmington Seahawks women's basketball team
Players
Coaches

Pos.	#	Name	Height	Year	Previous school	Hometown
G	0	Britany Range	5 ft 10 in (1.78 m)	Sr	Seton Hall	Middleburg, FL
G	1	Mary Ferrito	5 ft 10 in (1.78 m)	So	Wisconsin	Plain City, OH
G	2	Taylor Henderson	5 ft 11 in (1.8 m)	RS Fr	Winston Salem Christian School	Charlotte, NC
C	4	Lexi Jackson	6 ft 4 in (1.93 m)	Sr	Kent State	Pittsburgh, PA
G	10	McCall King	5 ft 10 in (1.78 m)	So	Christ Church Episcopal School	Easley, SC
F	11	Mingaile Urmuleviciute	6 ft 3 in (1.91 m)	So	Trinity Collegiate School	Kaunas, Lithuania
F	13	Corrie McLaughlin	6 ft 2 in (1.88 m)	Fr	Millbrook High School	Raleigh, NC
F	15	Sammy Ackles	6 ft 3 in (1.91 m)	RS Fr	Holly Springs High School	Holly Springs, NC
G	21	Kylah Silver	5 ft 10 in (1.78 m)	Fr	D. H. Conley High School	Greenville, NC
G	22	Evan Miller	5 ft 11 in (1.8 m)	Sr	Ardrey Kell High School	Charlotte, NC
G	33	Kylie Chavis	5 ft 7 in (1.7 m)	Fr	Purnell Swett High School	Red Springs, NC

Head coach

- Nicole Woods (Belmont Abbey)

Assistant coach(es)

- Cherie Lea (UNC Wilmington)
- Keyana Brown (Virginia State)
- Hailey Yohn (Coker)

Legend

- (C) Team captain
- (S) Suspended
- (I) Ineligible
- (W) Walk-on
- Injured
- Current redshirt

Roster
Last update: January 27, 2024

== Schedule and results ==
Date time, TV	Rank^{#}	Opponent^{#}	Result	Record	High points	High rebounds	High assists	Site (attendance) city, state
Exhibition
October 30, 2023*; 6:00 p.m., FloHoops		Mount Olive	L 47–51	–	14 – Henderson	7 – Miller	3 – Chavis	Trask Coliseum (512); Wilmington, NC
Non-conference regular season
November 7, 2023*; 6:00 p.m., FloHoops		The Apprentice School	W 78–42	1–0	18 – Henderson	8 – Jackson	5 – Henderson	Trask Coliseum (718); Wilmington, NC
November 11, 2023*; 3:00 p.m., ESPN+		at Wofford	L 49–74	1–1	10 – Jackson	9 – Jackson	3 – 2 tied	Jerry Richardson Indoor Stadium (428); Spartanburg, SC
November 16, 2023*; 11:00 a.m., FloHoops		Western Carolina	L 43–54	1–2	9 – Silver	10 – Jackson	3 – Ferrito	Trask Coliseum (3,370); Wilmington, NC
November 22, 2023*; 2:00 p.m., FloHoops		Presbyterian	L 51–64	1–3	16 – Silver	8 – Jackson	4 – Ferrito	Trask Coliseum (558); Wilmington, NC
November 26, 2023*; 2:00 p.m., FloHoops		Coastal Carolina	L 59–73	1–4	26 – Henderson	7 – Jackson	4 – Ferrito	Trask Coliseum (515); Wilmington, NC
November 29, 2023*; 6:00 p.m., ESPN+		at Winthrop	W 66–58 ^{OT}	2–4	26 – Miller	14 – Jackson	2 – 5 tied	Winthrop Coliseum (312); Rock Hill, SC
December 3, 2023*; 2:00 p.m., ESPN+		at Iowa State	L 58–85	2–5	19 – Miller	6 – Range	5 – Range	Hilton Coliseum (9,933); Ames, IA
December 5, 2023*; 8:00 p.m., B1G+		at Nebraska	L 35–108	2–6	9 – 2 tied	7 – Range	4 – Henderson	Pinnacle Bank Arena (3,950); Lincoln, NE
December 18, 2023*; 7:00 p.m., ESPN+		at Davidson	L 56–75	2–7	20 – Henderson	6 – Henderson	3 – Henderson	John M. Belk Arena (873); Davidson, NC
December 21, 2023*; 2:00 p.m., FloHoops		North Carolina Central	L 65–70	2–8	19 – Henderson	11 – Silver	6 – Ferrito	Trask Coliseum (507); Wilmington, NC
December 28, 2023*; 4:00 p.m.		at Norfolk State	L 55–96	2–9	20 – Miller	6 – Ferrito	3 – 2 tied	Joseph G. Echols Memorial Hall (831); Norfolk, VA
CAA regular season
January 5, 2024; 7:00 p.m., FloHoops		at Hofstra	L 54–82	2–10 (0–1)	21 – Miller	9 – Ferrito	2 – Miller	Mack Sports Complex (489); Hempstead, NY
January 7, 2024; 1:00 p.m., FloHoops		at Stony Brook	L 55–68	2–11 (0–2)	26 – Henderson	11 – Urmuleviciute	2 – 2 tied	Island Federal Arena (709); Stony Brook, NY
January 12, 2024; 7:00 p.m., FloHoops		Northeastern	L 49–79	2–12 (0–3)	15 – Henderson	6 – 2 tied	5 – Henderson	Trask Coliseum (605); Wilmington, NC
January 14, 2024; 12:00 p.m., FloHoops		Drexel	L 45–59	2–13 (0–4)	16 – Henderson	7 – Urmuleviciute	2 – 2 tied	Trask Coliseum (609); Wilmington, NC
January 19, 2024; 7:00 p.m., FloHoops		Campbell	W 69–58	3–13 (1–4)	17 – Henderson	10 – Ackles	6 – Henderson	Trask Coliseum (626); Wilmington, NC
January 21, 2024; 2:00 p.m., FloHoops		at Hampton	L 50–72	3–14 (1–5)	12 – Ackles	10 – Ackles	3 – Ferrito	Hampton Convocation Center (708); Hampton, VA
January 28, 2024; 1:00 p.m., FloHoops		at Charleston	L 59–94	3–15 (1–6)	17 – Silver	7 – Silver	4 – 2 tied	TD Arena (401); Charleston, SC
February 2, 2024; 7:00 p.m., FloHoops		North Carolina A&T	L 43–76	3–16 (1–7)	19 – Henderson	6 – 3 tied	3 – Henderson	Trask Coliseum (786); Wilmington, NC
February 4, 2024; 1:00 p.m., FloHoops		Hampton	W 77–70	4–16 (2–7)	22 – Ferrito	9 – 2 tied	6 – Miller	Trask Coliseum (771); Wilmington, NC
February 9, 2024; 7:00 p.m., FloHoops		at Campbell	L 57–77	4–17 (2–8)	20 – Henderson	6 – Henderson	3 – Silver	Gore Arena (1,129); Buies Creek, NC
February 11, 2024; 1:00 p.m., FloHoops		at Elon	W 60–58	5–17 (3–8)	18 – Silver	9 – Henderson	3 – Urmuleviciute	Schar Center (789); Elon, NC
February 18, 2024; 1:00 p.m., FloHoops		Charleston	L 58–97	5–18 (3–9)	24 – Henderson	8 – Silver	4 – King	Trask Coliseum (827); Wilmington, NC
February 23, 2024; 7:00 p.m., FloHoops		at Delaware	L 35–73	5–19 (3–10)	16 – Silver	9 – Miller	3 – Silver	Bob Carpenter Center (1,217); Newark, DE
February 25, 2024; 1:00 p.m., FloHoops		at Drexel	L 39–63	5–20 (3–11)	10 – Urmuleviciute	10 – Silver	2 – 3 tied	Daskalakis Athletic Center (511); Philadelphia, PA
March 1, 2024; 7:00 p.m., FloHoops		William & Mary	L 50–68	5–21 (3–12)	18 – Silver	9 – Henderson	1 – 3 tied	Trask Coliseum (607); Wilmington, NC
March 3, 2024; 1:00 p.m., FloHoops		Towson	L 56–78	5–22 (3–13)	23 – Henderson	11 – Henderson	3 – 2 tied	Trask Coliseum (560); Wilmington, NC
March 7, 2024; 7:00 p.m., FloHoops		Delaware	L 51–81	5–23 (3–14)	18 – Miller	8 – Henderson	6 – Henderson	Trask Coliseum (522); Wilmington, NC
March 9, 2024; 3:00 p.m., FloHoops		at Monmouth	L 53–65	5–24 (3–15)	20 – Henderson	5 – 2 tied	3 – Range	OceanFirst Bank Center (706); West Long Branch, NJ
CAA tournament
March 13, 2024; 5:00 p.m., FloHoops	(14)	vs. (11) Northeastern; First round	L 60–66	5–25	24 – Miller	9 – Henderson	4 – King	Entertainment and Sports Arena; Washington, D.C.
*Non-conference game. ^{#}Rankings from AP poll. (#) Tournament seedings in parentheses. All times are in Eastern.
