= 2023–24 Northeastern Huskies women's basketball team =

American college basketball season

2023–24 Northeastern Huskies women's basketball
- Conference: Coastal Athletic Association
- Record: 10–17 (5–13 CAA)
- Head coach: Priscilla Edwards-Lloyd (1st season)
- Associate head coach: Whitney Edwards
- Assistant coaches: Ugo Nwaigwe-Hirschman; James Spinelli; Nicole Ambrose
- Home arena: Cabot Center

2023–24 CAA women's basketball standings
	Conf.				Overall
Team	W		L	PCT	W		L	PCT
Stony Brook	16	–	2	.889	28	–	5	.848
Monmouth	14	–	4	.778	22	–	10	.688
Charleston	13	–	5	.722	22	–	10	.688
North Carolina A&T	13	–	5	.722	22	–	12	.647
William & Mary	12	–	6	.667	15	–	14	.517
Towson	11	–	7	.611	20	–	11	.645
Drexel †	10	–	8	.556	19	–	15	.559
Campbell	9	–	9	.500	17	–	14	.548
Elon	7	–	11	.389	11	–	21	.344
Delaware	7	–	11	.389	11	–	20	.355
Northeastern	5	–	13	.278	10	–	17	.370
Hampton	3	–	15	.167	3	–	26	.103
Hofstra	3	–	15	.167	11	–	21	.344
UNC Wilmington	3	–	15	.167	5	–	25	.167
† 2024 CAA tournament winner

The 2023–24 Northeastern Huskies women's basketball team represented Northeastern University during the 2023–24 NCAA Division I women's basketball season. The Huskies, led by first-year head coach Priscilla Edwards-Lloyd, played their home games at the Cabot Center in Boston, Massachusetts, as members of the Coastal Athletic Association (CAA).

== Previous season ==
The Huskies finished the 2022–23 season 19–12, 13–5 in CAA play, to finish in a three-way tie for first place. Due to tiebreakers, they received the #3 seed in the CAA tournament, where they were defeated by #6 seed Stony Brook in the quarterfinals, before being upset by #7 seed and eventual tournament champions Monmouth in the semifinals.

On April 7, 2023, it was announced that head coach Bridgette Mitchell would be leaving the program, in order to take the head coaching position at Fordham. On April 20, the school announced that Clemson assistant coach Priscilla Edwards-Lloyd would be the Huskies' next head coach.

== Roster ==
2023–24 Northeastern Huskies women's basketball team
Players
Coaches

Pos.	#	Name	Height	Year	Previous school	Hometown
G	0	Jaelyn Batts	6 ft 0 in (1.83 m)	Sr	Boston College	South Riding, VA
G	1	Derin Erdoğan	5 ft 7 in (1.7 m)	Sr	Arizona	Istanbul, Turkey
F	11	Oralye Kiefer	6 ft 3 in (1.91 m)	So	Beaver Country Day School	Wayland, MA
G	12	Camille Clement	5 ft 8 in (1.73 m)	Jr	Greely High School	Cumberland, ME
G	15	Yirsy Quéliz	5 ft 4 in (1.63 m)	Fr	St. Mary's High School	La Vega, Dominican Republic
F	20	Sophia Carlisle	6 ft 3 in (1.91 m)	Fr	Bishop O'Connell High School	Alexandria, VA
G	21	Ariana Webb	5 ft 9 in (1.75 m)	So	Moreau Catholic High School	Hayward, CA
G	22	Maddie Vizza	5 ft 6 in (1.68 m)	Sr	Germantown Academy	Southampton, PA
G	23	Gemima Motema	5 ft 9 in (1.75 m)	Jr	Portland High School	Portland, ME
F	24	Asha Parker	6 ft 2 in (1.88 m)	Jr	Northfield Mount Hermon School	Milford, CT
F	31	Deja Bristol	6 ft 1 in (1.85 m)	Sr	Virginia	Upper Marlboro, MD
G	32	Marian Turnbull	5 ft 7 in (1.7 m)	So	Chartiers Valley High School	Pittsburgh, PA
G/F	35	Halle Idowu	5 ft 11 in (1.8 m)	Sr	Toledo	Calumet Park, IL

Head coach

- Priscilla Edwards-Lloyd (St. Bonaventure)

Assistant coach(es)

- Whitney Edwards (New Hampshire)
- Ugo Nwaigwe-Hirschman (Wagner)
- James Spinelli (Temple)
- Nicole Ambrose (Louisville)

Legend

- (C) Team captain
- (S) Suspended
- (I) Ineligible
- (W) Walk-on
- Injured
- Current redshirt

Roster
Last update: January 24, 2024

== Schedule and results ==
Date time, TV	Rank^{#}	Opponent^{#}	Result	Record	High points	High rebounds	High assists	Site (attendance) city, state
Non-conference regular season
November 6, 2023*; 6:00 p.m., NEC Front Row		at Stonehill	W 73–61	1–0	22 – Motema	16 – Bristol	5 – Erdogan	Merkert Gymnasium (443); Easton, MA
November 9, 2023*; 7:00 p.m., NESN+/FloHoops		UMass	W 78–74	2–0	18 – Parker	6 – Erdogan	8 – Erdogan	Cabot Center (441); Boston, MA
November 12, 2023*; 2:00 p.m., ACCNX		at Boston College	L 58–67	2–1	15 – Erdogan	9 – Idowu	4 – 2 tied	Conte Forum (817); Chestnut Hill, MA
November 16, 2023*; 8:00 p.m., NESN+/FloHoops		Merrimack	W 58–47	3–1	17 – Erdogan	6 – 2 tied	3 – 2 tied	Cabot Center (231); Boston, MA
November 21, 2023*; 8:00 p.m., NESN+/FloHoops		Wagner	W 63–46	4–1	21 – Vizza	7 – Kiefer	8 – Erdogan	Cabot Center (239); Boston, MA
November 25, 2023*; 4:00 p.m., ESPN+		at Columbia	L 45–88	4–2	13 – Erdogan	5 – Parker	5 – Vizza	Levien Gymnasium (896); New York, NY
November 29, 2023*; 6:03 p.m., ESPN+		at New Hampshire	L 41–51	4–3	12 – Erdogan	8 – 2 tied	2 – 2 tied	Lundholm Gym (238); Durham, NH
December 4, 2023*; 7:00 p.m., ACCNX		at Syracuse	L 57–79	4–4	23 – Erdogan	10 – Parker	5 – Batts	JMA Wireless Dome (1,077); Syracuse, NY
December 17, 2023*; 2:00 p.m., ESPN+		at Holy Cross	L 41–65	4–5	12 – Erdogan	6 – Quéliz	4 – Erdogan	Hart Center (393); Worcester, MA
December 22, 2023*; 12:00 p.m., NESN/FloHoops		Boston University	L 80–83 ^{OT}	4–6	21 – Erdogan	6 – Bristol	5 – Erdogan	Cabot Center (352); Boston, MA
CAA regular season
January 5, 2024; 7:00 p.m., NESN+/FloHoops		Delaware	L 73–86	4–7 (0–1)	32 – Erdogan	6 – Erdogan	4 – Batts	Cabot Center (264); Boston, MA
January 7, 2024; 2:00 p.m., FloHoops		at Drexel	L 65–67	4–8 (0–2)	27 – Erdogan	7 – Bristol	8 – Batts	Daskalakis Athletic Center (517); Philadelphia, PA
January 12, 2024; 7:00 p.m., FloHoops		at UNC Wilmington	W 79–49	5–8 (1–2)	17 – Batts	8 – Erdogan	9 – Erdogan	Trask Coliseum (605); Wilmington, NC
January 14, 2024; 2:00 p.m., NESN/FloHoops		Hofstra	W 66–53	6–8 (2–2)	18 – Erdogan	12 – Bristol	7 – Batts	Cabot Center (271); Boston, MA
January 21, 2024; 1:00 p.m., FloHoops		Charleston	L 46–83	6–9 (2–3)	18 – Bristol	10 – Bristol	5 – Batts	Cabot Center (241); Boston, MA
January 26, 2024; 7:00 p.m., FloHoops		at Delaware	W 73–66	7–9 (3–3)	15 – Erdogan	5 – 2 tied	7 – Erdogan	Bob Carpenter Center (1,288); Newark, DE
January 28, 2024; 2:00 p.m., NESN/FloHoops		Campbell	L 43–54	7–10 (3–4)	16 – Erdogan	8 – Erdogan	4 – Erdogan	Cabot Center (201); Boston, MA
February 2, 2024; 11:00 a.m., FloHoops		at Elon	W 51–46	8–10 (4–4)	12 – 3 tied	6 – Vizza	4 – 2 tied	Schar Center (3,045); Elon, NC
February 4, 2024; 2:00 p.m., FloHoops		at North Carolina A&T	L 49–72	8–11 (4–5)	13 – Bristol	9 – Bristol	3 – Vizza	Corbett Sports Center (757); Greensboro, NC
February 9, 2024; 12:00 p.m., NESN/FloHoops		Monmouth	L 41–50	8–12 (4–6)	13 – Erdogan	5 – Erdogan	4 – Erdogan	Cabot Center (1,172); Boston, MA
February 11, 2024; 2:00 p.m., NESN/FloHoops		Stony Brook	L 35–71	8–13 (4–7)	9 – 2 tied	5 – Batts	3 – 2 tied	Cabot Center (312); Boston, MA
February 16, 2024; 7:00 p.m., NESN+/FloHoops		Elon	L 37–53	8–14 (4–8)	11 – Bristol	11 – Bristol	4 – 2 tied	Cabot Center (201); Boston, MA
February 18, 2024; 2:00 p.m., FloHoops		at Hofstra	L 46–66	8–15 (4–9)	12 – Erdogan	7 – Erdogan	4 – Erdogan	Mack Sports Complex (768); Hempstead, NY
February 25, 2024; 4:00 p.m., FloHoops		at Stony Brook	L 0–2 (Note: Forfeited due to limited roster availability)	8–15 (4–10)	–	–	–	Island Federal Arena; Stony Brook, NY
March 1, 2024; 7:00 p.m., FloHoops		North Carolina A&T	L 55–69	8–16 (4–11)	15 – Erdogan	8 – Bristol	6 – 2 tied	Cabot Center (201); Boston, MA
March 3, 2024; 2:00 p.m., FloHoops		Hampton	W 64–60	9–16 (5–11)	25 – Erdogan	9 – Carlisle	8 – Quéliz	Cabot Center (251); Boston, MA
March 7, 2024; 7:00 p.m., FloHoops		at William & Mary	L 0–2 (Note: Forfeited due to limited roster availability)	9–17 (5–12)	–	–	–	Kaplan Arena; Williamsburg, VA
March 9, 2024; 2:30 p.m., FloHoops		at Towson	L 0–2 (Note: Forfeited due to limited roster availability)	9–18 (5–13)	–	–	–	SECU Arena; Towson, MD
CAA tournament
March 13, 2024; 5:00 p.m., FloHoops	(11)	vs. (14) UNC Wilmington; First round	W 66–60	10–18	15 – Carlisle	10 – Erdogan	9 – Erdogan	Entertainment and Sports Arena; Washington, D.C.
March 14, 2024; 7:30 p.m., FloHoops	(11)	vs. (6) Towson; Second round	L 69–78	10–19	30 – Erdogan	6 – Bristol	4 – Erdogan	Entertainment and Sports Arena (650); Washington, D.C.
*Non-conference game. ^{#}Rankings from AP poll. (#) Tournament seedings in parentheses. All times are in Eastern.
