= 2023–24 Campbell Fighting Camels women's basketball team =

American college basketball season

2023–24 Campbell Fighting Camels women's basketball
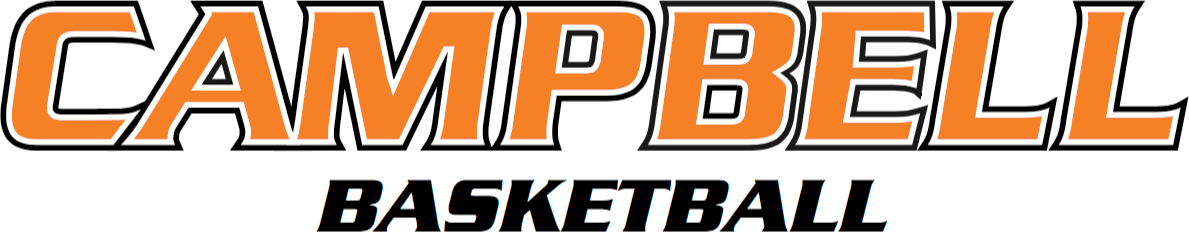
- Conference: Coastal Athletic Association
- Record: 17–14 (9–9 CAA)
- Head coach: Ronny Fisher (8th season)
- Associate head coach: Megan Hall
- Assistant coaches: Lindsay Bowen; Lakeisha Gregory
- Home arena: Gore Arena

2023–24 CAA women's basketball standings
	Conf.				Overall
Team	W		L	PCT	W		L	PCT
Stony Brook	16	–	2	.889	28	–	5	.848
Monmouth	14	–	4	.778	22	–	10	.688
Charleston	13	–	5	.722	22	–	10	.688
North Carolina A&T	13	–	5	.722	22	–	12	.647
William & Mary	12	–	6	.667	15	–	14	.517
Towson	11	–	7	.611	20	–	11	.645
Drexel †	10	–	8	.556	19	–	15	.559
Campbell	9	–	9	.500	17	–	14	.548
Elon	7	–	11	.389	11	–	21	.344
Delaware	7	–	11	.389	11	–	20	.355
Northeastern	5	–	13	.278	10	–	17	.370
Hampton	3	–	15	.167	3	–	26	.103
Hofstra	3	–	15	.167	11	–	21	.344
UNC Wilmington	3	–	15	.167	5	–	25	.167
† 2024 CAA tournament winner

The 2023–24 Campbell Fighting Camels women's basketball team represented Campbell University during the 2023–24 NCAA Division I women's basketball season. The Fighting Camels, led by eighth-year head coach Ronny Fisher, played their home games at Gore Arena in Buies Creek, North Carolina as first-year members of the Coastal Athletic Association.

== Previous season ==
The Fighting Camels finished the 2022–23 season 16–15, 10–8 in Big South play to finish in third place. As the #3 seed in the Big South tournament, they defeated #6 seed Longwood in the quarterfinals, before falling to #2 seed High Point in the semifinals.

== Roster ==
2023–24 Campbell Fighting Camels women's basketball team
Players
Coaches

Pos.	#	Name	Height	Year	Previous school	Hometown
G	0	Jessica Woods	5 ft 7 in (1.7 m)	Fr	Westwood High School	Columbia, South Carolina
G	4	Taylor Cotter	5 ft 10 in (1.78 m)	Sr	Holy Family	Fairfax, Virginia
F	10	Sarah Hammack Fitzgerald	6 ft 3 in (1.91 m)	Sr	Atlantic Shores Christian School	Chesapeake, Virginia
G	11	Shy Tuelle	5 ft 10 in (1.78 m)	GS	Hampton High School	Hampton, Tennessee
G	12	Hadleigh Dill	6 ft 0 in (1.83 m)	Fr	Enka High School	Candler, North Carolina
F	13	Courtney Dahlquist	6 ft 3 in (1.91 m)	Jr	Trinity High School	Washington, Pennsylvania
F	14	Brittany Staves	6 ft 0 in (1.83 m)	GS	Leesville Road High School	Raleigh, North Carolina
G	15	Audrey Fuller	5 ft 10 in (1.78 m)	Jr	All Hallows' School	Brisbane, Australia
G	20	Gemma Núñez	5 ft 7 in (1.7 m)	So	I.E.S. Bahia de Almería	Almería, Spain
G	21	Logan Nuckols	5 ft 6 in (1.68 m)	So	Patrick Henry High School	Rockville, Virginia
G	22	Gianni Boone	5 ft 11 in (1.8 m)	So	St. John's College High School	Washington, D.C.
F	24	Peris Smith	6 ft 2 in (1.88 m)	Fr	North Augusta High School	Graniteville, South Carolina
F	32	Christabel Ezumah	6 ft 2 in (1.88 m)	Sr	Lanier High School	Sugar Hill, Georgia
F	44	Svenia Nürenberg	5 ft 11 in (1.8 m)	GS	Sportlycee	Bergem, Luxembourg

Head coach

- Ronny Fisher (Furman)

Assistant coach(es)

- Megan Hall (Carson–Newman)
- Lindsay Bowen (Michigan State)
- Lakeisha Gregory (Austin Peay)

Legend

- (C) Team captain
- (S) Suspended
- (I) Ineligible
- (W) Walk-on
- Injured
- Current redshirt

Roster
Last update: January 25, 2024

== Schedule and results ==
Date time, TV	Rank^{#}	Opponent^{#}	Result	Record	High points	High rebounds	High assists	Site (attendance) city, state
Non-conference regular season
November 6, 2023*; 5:30 pm, FloHoops		North Carolina Wesleyan	W 108–37	1–0	16 – Ezumah	9 – Nürenberg	7 – Woods	Gore Arena (1,091); Buies Creek, NC
November 9, 2023*; 5:00 pm		at Coppin State	W 68–55	2–0	25 – Staves	8 – Tuelle	4 – Núñez	Physical Education Complex (462); Baltimore, MD
November 12, 2023*; 2:00 pm, ACCNX		at Virginia	L 49–74	2–1	14 – Ezumah	11 – Ezumah	8 – Tuelle	John Paul Jones Arena (3,965); Charlottesville, VA
November 18, 2023*; 2:00 pm, FloHoops		Western Carolina	W 70–52	3–1	14 – Fuller	14 – Ezumah	4 – Ezumah	Gore Arena (1,294); Buies Creek, NC
November 23, 2023*; 4:00 pm		vs. Morgan State; Puerto Rico Clasico	W 60–46	4–1	12 – Tuelle	8 – Ezumah	3 – 2 Tied	Coliseo Rubén Rodríguez (100); Bayamón, PR
November 24, 2023*; 6:30 pm		vs. Western Michigan; Puerto Rico Clasico	W 70–61	5–1	20 – Ezumah	8 – 2 Tied	4 – Nürenberg	Coliseo Rubén Rodríguez (100); Bayamón, PR
December 3, 2023*; 3:00 pm, ESPN+		at UCF	L 41–42	5–2	12 – Tuelle	12 – Ezumah	3 – 2 Tied	Addition Financial Arena (1,072); Orlando, FL
December 5, 2023*; 7:00 pm, FloHoops		North Carolina Central	W 74–61	6–2	17 – Nürenberg	10 – Núñez	5 – Staves	Gore Arena (909); Buies Creek, NC
December 14, 2023*; 11:30 am, FloHoops		Lancaster Bible	W 99–28	7–2	23 – Ezumah	16 – Ezumah	6 – Núñez	Gore Arena (2,809); Buies Creek, NC
December 17, 2023*; 2:00 pm, ESPN+		at East Tennessee State	L 39–54	7–3	11 – Ezumah	6 – Ezumah	3 – Núñez	Brooks Gymnasium (683); Johnson City, TN
December 21, 2023*; 7:00 pm, ESPN+		at High Point	L 47–48	7–4	10 – Nürenberg	8 – Tuelle	2 – 3 Tied	Qubein Center (1,128); High Point, NC
CAA regular season
January 5, 2024; 6:30 pm, FloHoops		at Stony Brook	L 43–73	7–5 (0–1)	11 – Ezumah	10 – Ezumah	3 – Staves	Island Federal Arena (732); Stony Brook, NY
January 7, 2024; 2:00 pm, FloHoops		at Monmouth	L 47–49	7–6 (0–2)	13 – Ezumah	5 – 3 Tied	5 – Núñez	OceanFirst Bank Center (550); West Long Branch, NJ
January 12, 2024; 7:00 pm, FloHoops		Elon	L 44–45	7–7 (0–3)	12 – Tuelle	12 – Ezumah	2 – 2 Tied	Gore Arena (1,023); Buies Creek, NC
January 14, 2024; 2:00 pm, FloHoops		Towson	W 69–59	8–7 (1–3)	24 – Ezumah	8 – Ezumah	4 – Núñez	Gore Arena (1,114); Buies Creek, NC
January 19, 2024; 7:00 pm, FloHoops		at UNC Wilmington	L 58–69	8–8 (1–4)	15 – Staves	6 – Ezumah	7 – Núñez	Trask Coliseum (626); Wilmington, NC
January 21, 2024; 2:00 pm, FloHoops		Stony Brook	W 75–73 ^{OT}	9–8 (2–4)	28 – Ezumah	7 – Ezumah	4 – 2 Tied	Gore Arena (963); Buies Creek, NC
January 26, 2024; 7:00 pm, FloHoops		North Carolina A&T	L 51–73	9–9 (2–5)	11 – Tuelle	8 – 2 Tied	5 – Núñez	Gore Arena (1,008); Buies Creek, NC
January 28, 2024; 2:00 pm, FloHoops		at Northeastern	W 54–43	10–9 (3–5)	17 – Ezumah	10 – Núñez	5 – Nürenberg	Cabot Center (201); Boston, MA
February 4, 2024; 1:00 pm, FloHoops		at Elon	W 53–35	11–9 (4–5)	16 – Fuller	11 – Nürenberg	5 – Nürenberg	Schar Center (719); Elon, NC
February 9, 2024; 7:00 pm, FloHoops		UNC Wilmington	W 77–57	12–9 (5–5)	14 – Boone	7 – Nürenberg	5 – 2 Tied	Gore Arena (1,129); Buies Creek, NC
February 11, 2024; 2:00 pm, FloHoops		at Charleston	L 51–65	12–10 (5–6)	11 – Tuelle	5 – 2 Tied	6 – Núñez	TD Arena (425); Charleston, SC
February 16, 2024; 7:00 pm, FloHoops		Monmouth	L 49–53	12–11 (5–7)	16 – Ezumah	12 – Ezumah	3 – Ezumah	Gore Arena (856); Buies Creek, NC
February 18, 2024; 2:00 pm, FloHoops		William & Mary	W 57–46	13–11 (6–7)	17 – Nürenberg	8 – Nürenberg	5 – Núñez	Gore Arena (1,002); Buies Creek, NC
February 25, 2024; 2:00 pm, FloHoops		Hofstra	W 65–51	14–11 (7–7)	20 – Tuelle	5 – Núñez	6 – Fuller	Gore Arena (1,047); Buies Creek, NC
March 1, 2024; 7:00 pm, FloHoops		at Delaware	W 66–65	15–11 (8–7)	14 – Tuelle	8 – Núñez	4 – Núñez	Bob Carpenter Center (1,094); Newark, DE
March 3, 2024; 2:00 pm, FloHoops		at Drexel	L 54–59	15–12 (8–8)	12 – Staves	5 – Staves	5 – Núñez	Daskalakis Athletic Center (684); Philadelphia, PA
March 7, 2024; 7:00 pm, FloHoops		Charleston	L 57–60	15–13 (8–9)	19 – Tuelle	13 – Ezumah	3 – Núñez	Gore Arena (906); Buies Creek, NC
March 9, 2024; 4:00 pm, FloHoops		at Hampton	W 70–61	16–13 (9–9)	16 – Ezumah	21 – Ezumah	4 – 2 Tied	Hampton Convocation Center (634); Hampton, VA
CAA tournament
March 14, 2024; 12:00 pm, FloHoops	(8)	vs. (9) Elon; Second Round	W 67–52	17–13	19 – Ezumah	13 – Ezumah	3 – Staves	Entertainment and Sports Arena; Washington, D.C.
March 15, 2024; 12:00 pm, FloHoops	(8)	vs. (1) Stony Brook; Quarterfinals	L 52–61	17–14	16 – Tuelle	9 – Nürenberg	6 – Núñez	Entertainment and Sports Arena; Washington, D.C.
*Non-conference game. ^{#}Rankings from AP Poll. (#) Tournament seedings in parentheses. All times are in Eastern.
