= 2023–24 Drexel Dragons women's basketball team =

Women's basketball team

2023–24 Drexel Dragons women's basketball

CAA tournament champions

NCAA tournament, First Round
- Conference: Coastal Athletic Association
- Record: 19–15 (10–8 CAA)
- Head coach: Amy Mallon (4th season)
- Assistant coaches: Stacy Weiss (12th season); Belle Koclanes (2nd season)
- Home arena: Daskalakis Athletic Center

2023–24 CAA women's basketball standings
	Conf.				Overall
Team	W		L	PCT	W		L	PCT
Stony Brook	16	–	2	.889	28	–	5	.848
Monmouth	14	–	4	.778	22	–	10	.688
Charleston	13	–	5	.722	22	–	10	.688
North Carolina A&T	13	–	5	.722	22	–	12	.647
William & Mary	12	–	6	.667	15	–	14	.517
Towson	11	–	7	.611	20	–	11	.645
Drexel †	10	–	8	.556	19	–	15	.559
Campbell	9	–	9	.500	17	–	14	.548
Elon	7	–	11	.389	11	–	21	.344
Delaware	7	–	11	.389	11	–	20	.355
Northeastern	5	–	13	.278	10	–	17	.370
Hampton	3	–	15	.167	3	–	26	.103
Hofstra	3	–	15	.167	11	–	21	.344
UNC Wilmington	3	–	15	.167	5	–	25	.167
† 2024 CAA tournament winner

The 2023–24 Drexel Dragons women's basketball team represented Drexel University during the 2023–24 NCAA Division I women's basketball season. The Dragons, led by fourth-year head coach Amy Mallon, played their home games at the Daskalakis Athletic Center in Philadelphia, Pennsylvania as members of the Coastal Athletic Association (formerly known as the Colonial Athletic Association through the 2022–23 season).

== Previous season ==
The Dragons finished the 2022–23 season 21–10, 13–5 in CAA play to finish in tied for first place. They lost to Monmouth in the CAA tournament quarterfinals. As conference regular season co-champions, the team earned an automatic bid to the 2023 Women's National Invitation Tournament, where they were defeated by Fordham in the first round.

== Offseason ==
=== Departures ===
Name	Number	Pos.	Height	Year	Hometown	Notes
Keishana Washington	1	G	5'7"	6th Year Sr	Pickering, Canada	Graduated, signed to Minnesota Lynx
Moriah Murray	3	G	5'9"	Freshman	Dunmore, PA	Transferred to Penn State
Brianne Borcky	10	F	6'0"	Senior	Garnet Valley, PA	Graduated
Tori Hyduke	11	G	5'6"	RS Senior	Fair Haven, NJ	Transferred to UMass
Kylie Lavelle	14	F	6'2"	Sophomore	Moosic, PA	Transferred to Penn State
Maura Hendrixson	22	G	5'9"	6th Year Sr	Garnet Valley, PA	Graduated

=== Incoming transfers ===
College recruiting information
Name	Hometown	School	Height	Weight	Commit date
Erin Doherty; G	Havertown, PA	Catholic University	5 ft 7 in (1.70 m)	N/A	Mar 27, 2023
Erin Doherty; G	Recruit ratings: No ratings found				
Amaris Baker; G	Philadelphia, PA	Harcum College	5 ft 8 in (1.73 m)	N/A	Apr 12, 2023
Amaris Baker; G	Recruit ratings: No ratings found				
Brooke Mullin; G	Langhorne, PA	Villanova University	5 ft 11 in (1.80 m)	N/A	May 24, 2023
Brooke Mullin; G	Recruit ratings: No ratings found				
Overall recruit ranking:
Note: In many cases, Scout, Rivals, 247Sports, On3, and ESPN may conflict in their listings of height and weight.; In these cases, the average was taken. ESPN grades are on a 100-point scale.; Sources: "Drexel 2023 Basketball Commitments". Rivals.; "Drexel Dragons". ESPN.; "2023 Team Ranking". Rivals.; "Drexel 2023 Basketball Commits". 247Sports.

=== Recruiting classes ===
==== 2023 recruiting class ====
College recruiting information
Name	Hometown	School	Height	Weight	Commit date
Laine McGurk; SF	West Chester, PA	West Chester Rustin HS	5 ft 10 in (1.78 m)	N/A	Dec 2, 2021
Laine McGurk; SF	Recruit ratings: No ratings found				
Clara Bergeron; SF	Saint-Jean-sur-Richelieu, Quebec	Cégep de Saint-Jean-sur-Richelieu	N/A	N/A	Jul 29, 2022
Clara Bergeron; SF	Recruit ratings: No ratings found				
Overall recruit ranking:
Note: In many cases, Scout, Rivals, 247Sports, On3, and ESPN may conflict in their listings of height and weight.; In these cases, the average was taken. ESPN grades are on a 100-point scale.; Sources: "Drexel 2023 Basketball Commitments". Rivals.; "Drexel Dragons". ESPN.; "2023 Team Ranking". Rivals.; "Drexel 2023 Basketball Commits". 247Sports.

==== 2024 recruiting class ====
College recruiting information (2024)
Name	Hometown	School	Height	Weight	Commit date
Mariah Watkins; G	West Chester, PA	Webster Schroeder HS	6 ft 0 in (1.83 m)	N/A	May 31, 2023
Mariah Watkins; G	Recruit ratings: No ratings found				
Overall recruit ranking:
Note: In many cases, Scout, Rivals, 247Sports, On3, and ESPN may conflict in their listings of height and weight.; In these cases, the average was taken. ESPN grades are on a 100-point scale.; Sources: "Drexel 2024 Basketball Commitments". Rivals.; "Drexel Dragons". ESPN.; "2024 Team Ranking". Rivals.; "Drexel 2024 Basketball Commits". 247Sports.

== Roster ==
2023–24 Drexel Dragons women's basketball team
Players
Coaches

Pos.	#	Name	Height	Year	Previous school	Hometown
F	2	Hetta Saatman	6 ft 2 in (1.88 m)		Linden Hall	Lancaster, PA
G	3	Amaris Baker	5 ft 8 in (1.73 m)	Jr	Cardinal O'Hara HS/Harcum	Philadelphia, PA
G	4	Jalyn McNeill	5 ft 9 in (1.75 m)	So	Our Lady of Good Counsel HS (MD)	Damascus, MD
F	5	Chloe Hodges	6 ft 0 in (1.83 m)	Sr	St Michael's	Adelaide, Australia
G	12	Grace O'Neill	5 ft 7 in (1.7 m)	So	Archbishop John Carroll HS	West Chester, PA
G	13	Erin Sweeney	5 ft 10 in (1.78 m)	Sr	Archbishop John Carroll HS	Havertown, PA
G	15	Brooke Mullin	5 ft 11 in (1.8 m)		Neshaminy HS/Villanova	Langhorne, PA
G	20	Jennifer Martin	5 ft 10 in (1.78 m)	So	Bradford Christian Academy (MA)	Westford, MA
F	21	Jasmine Valentine	5 ft 11 in (1.8 m)	Sr	St. Vincent Pallotti HS	Odenton, MD
F	22	Clara Bergeron	6 ft 2 in (1.88 m)	Fr	Cégep de Saint-Jean-sur-Richelieu	Montreal, Canada
G	23	Momo LaClair	5 ft 10 in (1.78 m)	Jr	Jamesville-DeWitt	Syracuse, NY
F	24	Sira Ba	5 ft 11 in (1.8 m)	Jr	Antoine-de-St-Exupéry	Montreal, Canada
G	25	Erin Doherty	5 ft 7 in (1.7 m)		Haverford HS/Catholic	Havertown, PA
G	41	Laine McGurk	5 ft 10 in (1.78 m)	Fr	West Chester Rustin HS	West Chester, PA

Head coach

- Amy Mallon (Saint Joseph's)

Assistant coach(es)

- Stacy Weiss (Drexel)
- Belle Koclanes (Richmond)

Legend

- (C) Team captain
- (S) Suspended
- (I) Ineligible
- (W) Walk-on
- Injured
- Current redshirt

Roster
Last update: July 29, 2023

== Schedule and results ==
Date time, TV	Rank^{#}	Opponent^{#}	Result	Record	High points	High rebounds	High assists	Site (attendance) city, state
Non-conference regular season
November 8, 2023*; 6:00 pm, FloHoops		Norfolk State	L 49–51	0–1	14 – Baker	7 – Baker	3 – O'Neill	Daskalakis Athletic Center (628); Philadelphia, PA
November 10, 2023*; 5:30 pm		at Delaware State	W 65–33	1–1	12 – 2 Tied	7 – 2 Tied	4 – O'Neill	Memorial Hall (500); Dover, DE
November 15, 2023*; 6:00 pm, NBCSPHI/FloHoops		La Salle; Big 5	W 71–46	2–1	20 – McGurk	7 – Hodges	5 – 2 Tied	Daskalakis Athletic Center (529); Philadelphia, PA
November 19, 2023*; 4:30 pm, FloHoops		Saint Joseph's; Big 5	L 53–64	2–2	17 – Mullin	5 – Valentine	3 – LaClair	Daskalakis Athletic Center (889); Philadelphia, PA
November 28, 2023*; 6:00 pm, ESPN+		at Lehigh	L 57–58	2–3	17 – Mullin	7 – Hodges	3 – Baker	Stabler Arena (482); Bethlhem, PA
December 6, 2023*; 7:00 pm, ESPN+		at Marist	W 51–36	3–3	18 – Hodges	7 – 2 Tied	3 – Mullins	McCann Arena (952); Poughkeepise, NY
December 9, 2023*; 2:00 pm, FloHoops		Buffalo	W 65–57	4–3	27 – Mullin	7 – O'Neill	7 – O'Neill	Daskalakis Athletic Center (491); Philadelphia, PA
December 17, 2023*; 2:00 pm, NBCSPHI/FloHoops		No. 22 Florida State	L 56–76	4–4	11 – Mullin	8 – Mullin	6 – Mullin	Daskalakis Athletic Center (476); Philadelphia, PA
December 20, 2023*; 7:00 pm, ESPN+		at Florida Gulf Coast; Homewood Suites Classic	L 35–61	4–5	12 – Mullin	6 – Valentine	2 – 2 Tied	Alico Arena (1,416); Fort Myers, FL
December 21, 2023*; 3:30 pm		vs. Cleveland State; Homewood Suites Classic	L 59–69	4–6	20 – Mullins	7 – Baker	4 – Hodges	Alico Arena (108); Fort Meyers, FL
December 29, 2023*; 2:00 pm, FloHoops		Arcadia	W 63–39	5–6	12 – 2 Tied	8 – LaClair	10 – Mullin	Daskalakis Athletic Center (427); Philadelphia, PA
CAA regular season
January 5, 2024; 6:00 pm, FloHoops		Hampton	W 72–57	6–6 (1–0)	22 – Mullin	6 – O'Neill	4 – Hodges	Daskalakis Athletic Center (404); Philadelphia, PA
January 7, 2024; 2:00 pm, FloHoops		Northeastern	W 67–65	7–6 (2–0)	21 – Hodges	7 – O'Neill	5 – Valentine	Daskalakis Athletic Center (517); Philadelphia, PA
January 12, 2024; 7:00 pm, FloHoops		at Charleston	L 48–60	7–7 (2–1)	11 – Valentine	8 – LaClair	6 – Mullin	TD Arena (420); Charleston, SC
January 14, 2024; 12:00 pm, FloHoops		at UNC Wilmington	W 59–45	8–7 (3–1)	18 – Mullin	10 – Baker	6 – 2 Tied	Trask Coliseum (609); Wilmington, NC
January 19, 2024; 7:00 pm, FloHoops		Hofstra	W 56–38	9–7 (4–1)	14 – Hodges	9 – 2 Tied	7 – O'Neill	Daskalakis Athletic Center (354); Philadelphia, PA
January 21, 2024; 1:00 pm, NBCSPHI/FloHoops		Monmouth	L 55–63	9–8 (4–2)	21 – Baker	6 – O'Neill	6 – Mullin	Daskalakis Athletic Center (637); Philadelphia, PA
January 28, 2024; 2:00 pm, NBCSPHI/FloHoops		at Stony Brook	L 41–62	9–9 (4–3)	8 – Valentine	10 – Hodges	4 – Mullin	Island Frderal Arena (1,296); Stony Brook, NY
February 2, 2024; 6:00 pm, NBCSPHI/FloHoops		Delaware	W 53–49	10–9 (5–3)	13 – Baker	13 – O'Neill	4 – 2 Tied	Daskalakis Athletic Center (602); Philadelphia, PA
February 4, 2024; 1:00 pm, FloHoops		at William & Mary	L 62–75	10–10 (5–4)	13 – Baker	13 – O'Neill	4 – 2 Tied	Kaplan Arena (1,163); Williamsburg, VA
February 11, 2024; 1:00 pm, FloHoops		North Carolina A&T	L 47–54	10–11 (5–5)	16 – Mullin	5 – 2 Tied	5 – Hodges	Daskalakis Athletic Center (327); Philadelphia, PA
February 16, 2024; 7:00 pm, FloHoops		at Towson	L 48–51 ^{OT}	10–12 (5–6)	23 – Hodges	10 – 2 Tied	6 – Mullin	SECU Arena (765); Towson, MD
February 18, 2024; 2:00 pm, FloHoops		at Delaware	W 61–59	11–12 (6–6)	15 – Baker	6 – O'Neill	8 – Mullin	Bob Carpenter Center (1,842); Wilmington, DE
February 23, 2024; 7:00 pm, NBCSPHI/FloHoops		at Monmouth	L 55–61	11–13 (6–7)	21 – McGurk	5 – 2 Tied	4 – Mullin	OceanFirst Bank Center (696); West Long Branch, NJ
February 25, 2024; 1:00 pm, NBCSPHI/FloHoops		UNC Wilmington	W 63–39	12–13 (7–7)	16 – Mullin	8 – O'Neill	4 – 3 Tied	Daskalakis Athletic Center (511); Philadelphia, PA
March 1, 2024; 6:00 pm, FloHoops		Stony Brook	L 58–60	12–14 (7–8)	21 – Baker	8 – O'Neill	5 – 3 Tied	Daskalakis Athletic Center (618); Philadelphia, PA
March 3, 2024; 2:00 pm, NBCSPHI/FloHoops		Campbell	W 59–54	13–14 (8–8)	15 – Saatman	4 – 2 Tied	7 – Hodges	Daskalakis Athletic Center (684); Philadelphia, PA
March 7, 2024; 6:00 pm, FloHoops		at North Carolina A&T	W 67–54	14–14 (9–8)	26 – Baker	7 – Saatman	6 – Hodges	Corbett Sports Center (1,071); Greensboro, NC
March 9, 2024; 12:00 pm, FloHoops		at Elon	W 56–43	15–14 (10–8)	12 – 2 Tied	9 – O'Neill	5 – Mullin	Schar Center (809); Elon, NC
CAA Tournament
March 14, 2024; 5:00 pm, FloHoops	(7)	vs. (10) Delaware; Second Round	W 57–55	16–14	19 – Baker	9 – Baker	4 – Hodges	Entertainment and Sports Arena; Washington, D.C.
March 15, 2024; 5:00 pm, FloHoops	(7)	vs. (2) Monmouth; Quarterfinals	W 58–56	17–14	18 – Baker	6 – Saatman	5 – Baker	Entertainment and Sports Arena; Washington, D.C.
March 16, 2024; 4:30 pm, FloHoops	(7)	vs. (6) Towson; Semifinals	W 69–68	18–14	23 – Baker	8 – Valentine	7 – O'Neill	Entertainment and Sports Arena (875); Washington, D.C.
March 17, 2024; 2:00 pm, CBSSN	(7)	vs. (1) Stony Brook; Championship	W 68–60	19–14	19 – Baker	7 – Hodges	6 – Hodges	Entertainment and Sports Arena (700); Washington, D.C.
NCAA Tournament
March 22, 2024*; 3:00 pm, ESPNU	(16 P4)	at (1 P4) No. 4 Texas; First Round	L 42–82	19–15	10 – Baker	8 – Hodges	3 – Mullin	Moody Center (7,487); Austin, TX
*Non-conference game. ^{#}Rankings from AP Poll. (#) Tournament seedings in parentheses. P4=Portland 4. All times are in Eastern Time.

== See also ==
- 2023–24 Drexel Dragons men's basketball team
