= 2023–24 North Carolina A&T Aggies women's basketball team =

American college basketball season

2023–24 North Carolina A&T Aggies women's basketball

WNIT, Super 16
- Conference: Coastal Athletic Association
- Record: 22–12 (13–5 CAA)
- Head coach: Tarrell Robinson (12th season)
- Associate head coach: Shavon Earp
- Assistant coaches: Mike Moses Jr.; Asia Dozier
- Home arena: Corbett Sports Center

2023–24 CAA women's basketball standings
	Conf.				Overall
Team	W		L	PCT	W		L	PCT
Stony Brook	16	–	2	.889	28	–	5	.848
Monmouth	14	–	4	.778	22	–	10	.688
Charleston	13	–	5	.722	22	–	10	.688
North Carolina A&T	13	–	5	.722	22	–	12	.647
William & Mary	12	–	6	.667	15	–	14	.517
Towson	11	–	7	.611	20	–	11	.645
Drexel †	10	–	8	.556	19	–	15	.559
Campbell	9	–	9	.500	17	–	14	.548
Elon	7	–	11	.389	11	–	21	.344
Delaware	7	–	11	.389	11	–	20	.355
Northeastern	5	–	13	.278	10	–	17	.370
Hampton	3	–	15	.167	3	–	26	.103
Hofstra	3	–	15	.167	11	–	21	.344
UNC Wilmington	3	–	15	.167	5	–	25	.167
† 2024 CAA tournament winner

The 2023–24 North Carolina A&T Aggies women's basketball team represented North Carolina A&T State University during the 2023–24 NCAA Division I women's basketball season. The Aggies, led by 12th-year head coach Tarrell Robinson, played their home games at the Corbett Sports Center in Greensboro, North Carolina as members of the Coastal Athletic Association (CAA).

== Previous season ==
The Aggies finished the 2022–23 season 18–12, 12–6 in CAA play, to finish in a tie for fourth place. As the #5 seed in the CAA tournament, they were upset by #12 seed Hofstra in the first round.

== Roster ==
2023–24 North Carolina A&T Aggies women's basketball team
Players
Coaches

Pos.	#	Name	Height	Year	Previous school	Hometown
F	0	Laila Acox	6 ft 0 in (1.83 m)	Jr	East Carolina	Blythewood, SC
G	1	Jakieya Thompson	5 ft 7 in (1.7 m)	Fr	St. Pauls High School	Hope Mills, NC
G	3	Sean Kelly Darks	5 ft 8 in (1.73 m)	Sr	Walnut Hills High School	Cincinnati, OH
G	4	Raigan Lawrence	5 ft 8 in (1.73 m)	So	Avondale High School	Auburn Hills, MI
G	10	D'Mya Tucker	5 ft 11 in (1.8 m)	Sr	Orangeburg-Wilkinson High School	Orangeburg, SC
G	11	Tiana Amos	5 ft 6 in (1.68 m)	So	LIU	Dallas, TX
F	12	Levossie Taylor	5 ft 11 in (1.8 m)	Sr	North Raleigh Christian Academy	Princeton, NC
F	20	Talia Davis	6 ft 0 in (1.83 m)	Jr	New Hampshire	Dedham, MA
G	21	Jordyn Dorsey	5 ft 9 in (1.75 m)	Jr	Cross Creek High School	Augusta, GA
G	22	Nyah Willis	5 ft 10 in (1.78 m)	GS	Presbyterian	San Jose, CA
G	23	Nahndi Smith	5 ft 6 in (1.68 m)	Jr	Asheville Christian Academy	Hendersonville, NC
G	24	Maleia Bracone	5 ft 10 in (1.78 m)	Sr	Presbyterian	Anderson, SC
F	25	Paris Locke	6 ft 0 in (1.83 m)	Fr	McDonogh School	Baltimore, MD
F	32	Keona Curtis	6 ft 1 in (1.85 m)	So	Grovetown High School	Grovetown, GA
C	33	Chaniya Clark	6 ft 4 in (1.93 m)	RS So	Fort Myers Senior High School	Fort Myers, FL
C	44	Mia Hardin	6 ft 4 in (1.93 m)	Jr	Southern Arkansas University Tech	Bastrop, LA

Head coach

- Tarrell Robinson (North Carolina A&T)

Assistant coach(es)

- Shavon Earp (Radford)
- Mike Moses Jr. (Fayetteville State)
- Asia Dozier (South Carolina)

Legend

- (C) Team captain
- (S) Suspended
- (I) Ineligible
- (W) Walk-on
- Injured
- Current redshirt

Roster
Last update: January 22, 2024

== Schedule and results ==
Date time, TV	Rank^{#}	Opponent^{#}	Result	Record	High points	High rebounds	High assists	Site (attendance) city, state
Non-conference regular season
November 6, 2023*; 7:00 p.m., SECN+		at Georgia	L 59–71	0–1	14 – Tucker	8 – Clark	3 – Clark	Stegeman Coliseum (2,116); Athens, GA
November 10, 2023*; 5:00 p.m., FloHoops		Guilford	W 114–41	1–1	23 – Tucker	9 – 2 tied	9 – Dorsey	Corbett Sports Center (929); Greensboro, NC
November 15, 2023*; 6:00 p.m., ACCNX		at Wake Forest	W 56–51	2–1	16 – Bracone	10 – Bracone	3 – Dorsey	LJVM Coliseum (943); Winston-Salem, NC
November 19, 2023*; 2:00 p.m., FloHoops		Liberty	W 56–47	3–1	17 – Clark	10 – Clark	4 – 2 tied	Corbett Sports Center (612); Greensboro, NC
November 24, 2023*; 9:00 p.m., ESPN+		at Saint Mary's; Saint Mary's Thanksgiving Classic	L 65–73	3–2	12 – 2 tied	7 – 3 tied	5 – Dorsey	University Credit Union Pavilion (264); Moraga, CA
November 25, 2023*; 4:00 p.m.		vs. UT Arlington; Saint Mary's Thanksgiving Classic	L 76–87	3–3	21 – Bracone	6 – Dorsey	4 – Bracone	University Credit Union Pavilion (76); Moraga, CA
December 3, 2023*; 12:00 p.m., ACCNX		at No. 22 Louisville	L 40–80	3–4	11 – Bracone	4 – 4 tied	2 – 3 tied	KFC Yum! Center (7,618); Louisville, KY
December 9, 2023*; 2:00 p.m., FloHoops		Mercer	L 52–55	3–5	14 – Dorsey	7 – Clark	3 – 2 tied	Corbett Sports Center (1,054); Greensboro, NC
December 19, 2023*; 11:00 am, ESPN+		at Stetson; Hatter Classic	W 57–54	4–5	15 – Dorsey	13 – Clark	3 – Locke	Edmunds Center; DeLand, FL
December 20, 2023*; 1:00 p.m.		vs. Bethune–Cookman; Hatter Classic	W 66–47	5–5	20 – Tucker	8 – Hardin	6 – Dorsey	Edmunds Center; DeLand, FL
December 30, 2023*; 2:00 p.m., FloHoops		Averett	W 90–30	6–5	22 – Tucker	7 – 2 tied	8 – Bracone	Corbett Sports Center (395); Greensboro, NC
CAA regular season
January 5, 2024; 6:00 p.m., FloHoops		Charleston	L 58–63	6–6 (0–1)	11 – 2 tied	11 – Clark	6 – Dorsey	Corbett Sports Center (906); Greensboro, NC
January 7, 2024; 2:00 p.m., FloHoops		Towson	W 62–52 ^{OT}	7–6 (1–1)	14 – Dorsey	10 – Locke	3 – 2 tied	Corbett Sports Center (653); Greensboro, NC
January 12, 2024; 7:00 p.m., FloHoops		at William & Mary	W 53–51	8–6 (2–1)	11 – Dorsey	12 – Clark	2 – 2 tied	Kaplan Arena (855); Williamsburg, VA
January 14, 2024; 2:00 p.m., FloHoops		at Hampton	W 67–57	9–6 (3–1)	18 – Dorsey	10 – Clark	4 – Locke	Hampton Convocation Center (1,202); Hampton, VA
January 21, 2024; 1:00 p.m., FloHoops		Delaware	W 65–62	10–6 (4–1)	17 – Dorsey	6 – 2 tied	3 – 3 tied	Corbett Sports Center (1,003); Greensboro, NC
January 26, 2024; 7:00 p.m., FloHoops		at Campbell	W 73–51	11–6 (5–1)	21 – Dorsey	5 – Dorsey	4 – Bracone	Gore Arena (1,008); Buies Creek, NC
January 28, 2024; 2:00 p.m., FloHoops		Elon	W 56–42	12–6 (6–1)	15 – Dorsey	7 – 2 tied	4 – Dorsey	Corbett Sports Center (1,059); Greensboro, NC
February 2, 2024; 7:00 p.m., FloHoops		at UNC Wilmington	W 76–43	13–6 (7–1)	23 – Dorsey	10 – Dorsey	7 – Bracone	Trask Coliseum (786); Wilmington, NC
February 4, 2024; 2:00 p.m., FloHoops		Northeastern	W 72–49	14–6 (8–1)	22 – Dorsey	8 – Acox	5 – Dorsey	Corbett Sports Center (757); Greensboro, NC
February 9, 2024; 7:00 p.m., FloHoops		at Charleston	L 62–66	14–7 (8–2)	13 – Bracone	12 – Clark	2 – Locke	TD Arena (452); Charleston, SC
February 11, 2024; 6:00 p.m., FloHoops		at Drexel	W 54–47	15–7 (9–2)	13 – Bracone	9 – Clark	3 – 2 tied	Daskalakis Athletic Center (327); Philadelphia, PA
February 16, 2024; 6:00 p.m., FloHoops		Hampton	W 73–58	16–7 (10–2)	21 – Dorsey	12 – Tucker	4 – 2 tied	Corbett Sports Center (1,759); Greensboro, NC
February 18, 2024; 2:00 p.m., FloHoops		Monmouth	L 76–80 ^{2OT}	16–8 (10–3)	18 – Locke	11 – Dorsey	8 – Dorsey	Corbett Sports Center (1,048); Greensboro, NC
February 25, 2024; 2:00 p.m., FloHoops		at Elon	W 77–46	17–8 (11–3)	18 – Dorsey	9 – 2 tied	6 – Dorsey	Schar Center (1,342); Elon, NC
March 1, 2024; 5:00 p.m., FloHoops		at Northeastern	W 69–55	18–8 (12–3)	19 – Clark	12 – Clark	4 – Bracone	Cabot Center (201); Boston, MA
March 3, 2024; 2:00 p.m., FloHoops		at Stony Brook	L 62–76	18–9 (12–4)	16 – Tucker	8 – Clark	4 – Dorsey	Island Federal Arena (1,131); Stony Brook, NY
March 7, 2024; 6:00 p.m., FloHoops		Drexel	L 54–67	18–10 (12–5)	12 – Clark	13 – Clark	3 – Bracone	Corbett Sports Center (1,071); Greensboro, NC
March 9, 2024; 2:00 p.m., FloHoops		Hofstra	W 57–46	19–10 (13–5)	16 – Tucker	8 – Clark	4 – Dorsey	Corbett Sports Center (808); Greensboro, NC
CAA tournament
March 15, 2024; 2:30 p.m., FloHoops	(4)	vs. (13) Hofstra; Quarterfinals	W 55–40	20–10	15 – Dorsey	19 – Clark	3 – Dorsey	Entertainment and Sports Arena; Washington, D.C.
March 16, 2024; 2:00 p.m., FloHoops	(4)	vs. (1) Stony Brook; Semifinals	L 51–59	20–11	13 – 2 tied	12 – Clark	3 – Dorsey	Entertainment and Sports Arena (875); Washington, D.C.
WNIT
March 22, 2024; 7:00 p.m.		UNC Greensboro; First round	W 56–51	21–11	17 – Dorsey	6 – Locke	3 – Locke	Corbett Sports Center (3,909); Greensboro, NC
March 24, 2024; 7:00 p.m., FloHoops		Old Dominion; Second round	W 48–45	22–11	17 – Bracone	8 – 2 tied	4 – Dorsey	Corbett Sports Center (3,224); Greensboro, NC
March 29, 2024; 7:00 p.m., FloHoops		Troy; Sweet 16	L 62–92	22–12	18 – Dorsey	11 – Locke	5 – 2 tied	Corbett Sports Center (3,712); Greensboro, NC
*Non-conference game. ^{#}Rankings from AP poll. (#) Tournament seedings in parentheses. All times are in Eastern.
