= 2023–24 Hampton Lady Pirates basketball team =

American college basketball season

2023–24 Hampton Lady Pirates basketball
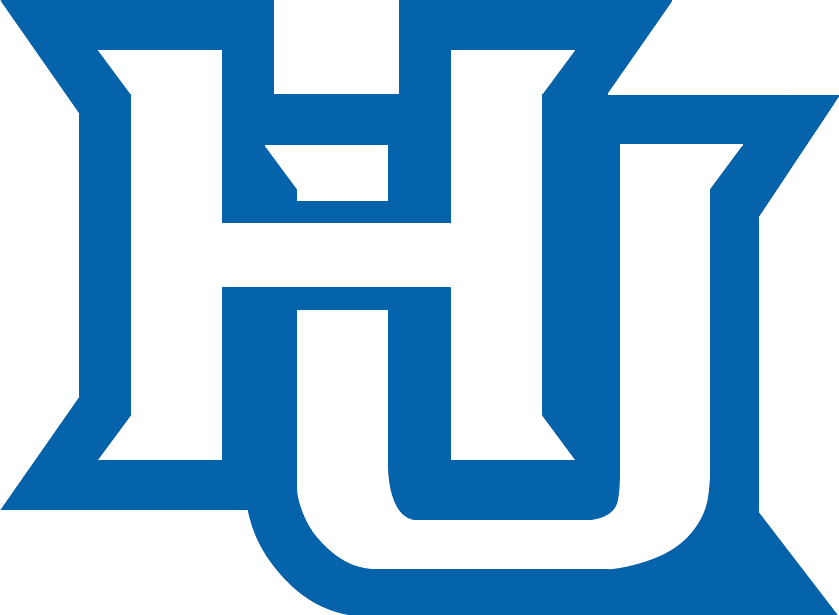
- Conference: Coastal Athletic Association
- Record: 3–26 (3–15 CAA)
- Head coach: David Six (15th season)
- Assistant coaches: Jermaine Brown; Toia Giggetts
- Home arena: Hampton Convocation Center

2023–24 CAA women's basketball standings
	Conf.				Overall
Team	W		L	PCT	W		L	PCT
Stony Brook	16	–	2	.889	28	–	5	.848
Monmouth	14	–	4	.778	22	–	10	.688
Charleston	13	–	5	.722	22	–	10	.688
North Carolina A&T	13	–	5	.722	22	–	12	.647
William & Mary	12	–	6	.667	15	–	14	.517
Towson	11	–	7	.611	20	–	11	.645
Drexel †	10	–	8	.556	19	–	15	.559
Campbell	9	–	9	.500	17	–	14	.548
Elon	7	–	11	.389	11	–	21	.344
Delaware	7	–	11	.389	11	–	20	.355
Northeastern	5	–	13	.278	10	–	17	.370
Hampton	3	–	15	.167	3	–	26	.103
Hofstra	3	–	15	.167	11	–	21	.344
UNC Wilmington	3	–	15	.167	5	–	25	.167
† 2024 CAA tournament winner

The 2023–24 Hampton Lady Pirates basketball team represented Hampton University during the 2023–24 NCAA Division I women's basketball season. The Lady Pirates, led by 15th-year head coach David Six, played their home games at the Hampton Convocation Center in Hampton, Virginia as members of the Coastal Athletic Association (CAA).

The Lady Pirates finished the season 3–26, 3–15 in CAA play, to finish in a three-way tie for last place. They were defeated by Hofstra in the first round of the CAA tournament.

On March 18, 2024, head coach David Six announced his retirement, after leading Hampton for 15 years. On March 26, the school announced the hiring of Florida associate head coach Tamisha Augustin as Six's successor.

== Previous season ==
The Lady Pirates finished the 2022–23 season 12–18, 8–10 in CAA play, to finish in ninth place. As the #9 seed in the CAA tournament, they defeated #8 seed Delaware in the second round before falling to top-seeded Towson in the quarterfinals.

== Roster ==
2023–24 Hampton Pirates women's basketball team
Players
Coaches

Pos.	#	Name	Height	Year	Previous school	Hometown
G/F	0	Camryn Hill	6 ft 0 in (1.83 m)	Sr	Oral Roberts	Dallas, TX
G	1	Le'Asia Foreman	5 ft 8 in (1.73 m)	So	Norview HS	Norfolk, VA
G	2	Malaka Cobb	5 ft 5 in (1.65 m)	Fr	Shabach Christian Academy	Bowie, MD
G/F	3	Jenae Dublin	6 ft 2 in (1.88 m)	Jr	Georgia State	Suitland, MD
G	4	Arlisha Boston	5 ft 11 in (1.8 m)	Fr	King's Fork HS	Suffolk, VA
G/F	5	Vanessa Schwarzmann	5 ft 8 in (1.73 m)	Fr	Prince George's CC	Upper Marlboro, MD
G	10	Tyra Kennedy	5 ft 7 in (1.7 m)	Fr	Brooks-DeBartolo Collegiate HS	Tampa, FL
F	11	Zaiha Minnis	5 ft 10 in (1.78 m)	So	Harvard	Clinton, MD
G	13	Heaven Accimeus	5 ft 8 in (1.73 m)	Sr	Lawrenceville School	Brooklyn, NY
C	14	Ariana Wilkes	6 ft 3 in (1.91 m)	So	Spring Valley HS	Columbia, SC
F	21	Casey Miller	6 ft 2 in (1.88 m)	Fr	Woodstock HS	Woodstock, GA
G	22	Amyah Reaves	5 ft 9 in (1.75 m)	Jr	Hamilton HS	Chandler, AZ
G	23	Cheyenne Talbot	5 ft 7 in (1.7 m)	Sr	Mount Vernon HS	Mount Vernon, NY
F	24	Aisha Dabo	6 ft 2 in (1.88 m)	Jr	UMass	Queens, NY
F	25	Antonia Whorley	6 ft 0 in (1.83 m)	Jr	Louisburg College	Lynchburg, VA

Head coach

- David Six (Hunter College)

Assistant coach(es)

- Jermaine Brown (South Carolina State)
- Toia Giggetts (James Madison)

Legend

- (C) Team captain
- (S) Suspended
- (I) Ineligible
- (W) Walk-on
- Injured
- Current redshirt

Roster
Last update: January 27, 2024

== Schedule and results ==
Date time, TV	Rank^{#}	Opponent^{#}	Result	Record	High points	High rebounds	High assists	Site (attendance) city, state
Non-conference regular season
November 7, 2023*; 7:00 p.m., FloHoops		at Providence	L 46–76	0–1	20 – Hill	5 – 2 tied	3 – Reaves	Alumni Hall (812); Providence, RI
November 15, 2023*; 11:00 a.m., ACCNX		at No. 17 North Carolina	L 32–62	0–2	7 – Dabo	5 – 2 tied	3 – Talbot	Carmichael Arena (3,144); Chapel Hill, NC
November 19, 2023*; 2:00 p.m., FloHoops		Norfolk State; Battle of the Bay	L 45–59	0–3	12 – Foreman	6 – Wilkes	4 – Cobb	Hampton Convocation Center (1,316); Hampton, VA
November 24, 2023*; 4:00 p.m.		vs. New Mexico State; LIU Classic	L 47–78	0–4	25 – Talbot	7 – Talbot	1 – 3 tied	Steinberg Wellness Center (100); Brooklyn, NY
November 25, 2023*; 3:00 p.m.		at LIU; LIU Classic	L 53–60	0–5	26 – Hill	9 – Dabo	4 – 2 tied	Steinberg Wellness Center (140); Brooklyn, NY
November 29, 2023*; 11:00 a.m., ESPN+		at East Carolina	L 55–75	0–6	17 – Talbot	9 – Talbot	3 – Hill	Williams Arena (6,166); Greenville, NC
December 10, 2023*; 4:00 p.m., MWN		at New Mexico	L 55–68	0–7	20 – Hill	10 – Boston	5 – Reaves	The Pit (4,638); Albuquerque, NM
December 16, 2023*; 2:00 p.m., ESPN+		at George Washington	L 40–46	0–8	14 – Hill	5 – 2 tied	2 – Cobb	Charles E. Smith Center (378); Washington, D.C.
December 19, 2023*; 3:00 p.m.		vs. Georgia Southern; Coastal Empire Eagle Classic	L 48–74	0–9	13 – Talbot	7 – Hill	2 – 3 tied	Enmarket Arena (407); Savannah, GA
December 21, 2023*; 2:00 p.m., FloHoops		Saint Peter's	L 58–69	0–10	12 – Dublin	7 – Hill	5 – Foreman	Hampton Convocation Center (429); Hampton, VA
CAA regular season
January 5, 2024; 6:00 p.m., FloHoops		at Drexel	L 57–72	0–11 (0–1)	26 – Hill	5 – Dabo	3 – 2 tied	Daskalakis Athletic Center (404); Philadelphia, PA
January 7, 2024; 2:00 p.m., FloHoops		at Delaware	L 61–76	0–12 (0–2)	25 – Hill	8 – Talbot	2 – 4 tied	Bob Carpenter Center (1,151); Newark, DE
January 14, 2024; 2:00 p.m., FloHoops		North Carolina A&T	L 57–67	0–13 (0–3)	14 – Foreman	10 – Foreman	2 – 3 tied	Hampton Convocation Center (1,202); Hampton, VA
January 19, 2024; 7:00 p.m., FloHoops		at Towson	L 53–83	0–14 (0–4)	16 – Reaves	9 – Dublin	2 – 2 tied	SECU Arena (224); Towson, MD
January 21, 2024; 2:00 p.m., FloHoops		UNC Wilmington	W 72–50	1–14 (1–4)	21 – Dublin	9 – Dublin	2 – 4 tied	Hampton Convocation Center (708); Hampton, VA
January 26, 2024; 7:00 p.m., FloHoops		Monmouth	L 61–69	1–15 (1–5)	17 – Hill	7 – Reaves	2 – 3 tied	Hampton Convocation Center (682); Hampton, VA
January 28, 2024; 2:00 p.m., FloHoops		Hofstra	W 67–62	2–15 (2–5)	17 – Hill	5 – Dublin	2 – 2 tied	Hampton Convocation Center (872); Hampton, VA
February 2, 2024; 7:00 p.m., FloHoops		at Charleston	L 57–86	2–16 (2–6)	30 – Hill	7 – 2 tied	3 – Cobb	TD Arena (424); Charleston, SC
February 4, 2024; 1:00 p.m., FloHoops		at UNC Wilmington	L 70–77	2–17 (2–7)	20 – Hill	8 – 2 tied	7 – Reaves	Trask Coliseum (771); Wilmington, NC
February 9, 2024; 7:00 p.m., FloHoops		Elon	L 51–69	2–18 (2–8)	19 – Hill	7 – Hill	2 – Reaves	Hampton Convocation Center (699); Hampton, VA
February 11, 2024; 2:00 p.m., FloHoops		William & Mary	L 55–65	2–19 (2–9)	16 – Reaves	9 – Talbot	5 – Reaves	Hampton Convocation Center (668); Hampton, VA
February 16, 2024; 6:00 p.m., FloHoops		at North Carolina A&T	L 58–73	2–20 (2–10)	19 – Hill	5 – 2 tied	7 – Reaves	Corbett Sports Center (1,759); Greensboro, NC
February 23, 2024; 7:00 p.m., FloHoops		Towson	L 65–78	2–21 (2–11)	15 – 3 tied	7 – Talbot	3 – Reaves	Hampton Convocation Center (1,365); Hampton, VA
February 25, 2024; 1:00 p.m., FloHoops		at William & Mary	L 58–66	2–22 (2–12)	16 – Reaves	7 – Reaves	4 – Reaves	Kaplan Arena (1,291); Williamsburg, VA
March 1, 2024; 7:00 p.m., FloHoops		at Hofstra	W 48–42	3–22 (3–12)	12 – Hill	10 – Dabo	3 – Reaves	Mack Sports Complex (354); Hempstead, NY
March 3, 2024; 2:00 p.m., FloHoops		at Northeastern	L 60–64	3–23 (3–13)	15 – Talbot	11 – Reaves	5 – Reaves	Cabot Center (251); Boston, MA
March 7, 2024; 7:00 p.m., FloHoops		Stony Brook	L 35–71	3–24 (3–14)	19 – Hill	8 – Dabo	4 – 2 tied	Hampton Convocation Center (644); Hampton, VA
March 9, 2024; 4:00 p.m., FloHoops		Campbell	L 61–70	3–25 (3–15)	19 – Talbot	10 – Talbot	7 – Reaves	Hampton Convocation Center (634); Hampton, VA
CAA tournament
March 13, 2024; 2:30 p.m., FloHoops	(12)	vs. (13) Hofstra; First round	L 55–71	3–26	18 – Talbot	7 – 2 tied	3 – Foreman	Entertainment and Sports Arena; Washington, D.C.
*Non-conference game. ^{#}Rankings from AP poll. (#) Tournament seedings in parentheses. All times are in Eastern.
