= 2023–24 Charleston Cougars women's basketball team =

American college basketball season

2023–24 Charleston Cougars women's basketball

WNIT, second round
- Conference: Coastal Athletic Association
- Record: 22–10 (13–5 CAA)
- Head coach: Robin Harmony (5th season)
- Associate head coach: Randy Schneider
- Assistant coaches: Yannick Denson; Tiffany Conner; Chastadie Barrs
- Home arena: TD Arena

2023–24 CAA women's basketball standings
	Conf.				Overall
Team	W		L	PCT	W		L	PCT
Stony Brook	16	–	2	.889	28	–	5	.848
Monmouth	14	–	4	.778	22	–	10	.688
Charleston	13	–	5	.722	22	–	10	.688
North Carolina A&T	13	–	5	.722	22	–	12	.647
William & Mary	12	–	6	.667	15	–	14	.517
Towson	11	–	7	.611	20	–	11	.645
Drexel †	10	–	8	.556	19	–	15	.559
Campbell	9	–	9	.500	17	–	14	.548
Elon	7	–	11	.389	11	–	21	.344
Delaware	7	–	11	.389	11	–	20	.355
Northeastern	5	–	13	.278	10	–	17	.370
Hampton	3	–	15	.167	3	–	26	.103
Hofstra	3	–	15	.167	11	–	21	.344
UNC Wilmington	3	–	15	.167	5	–	25	.167
† 2024 CAA tournament winner

The 2023–24 Charleston Cougars women's basketball team represented the College of Charleston during the 2023–24 NCAA Division I women's basketball season. The Cougars, led by fifth-year head coach Robin Harmony, played their home games at TD Arena in Charleston, South Carolina as members of the Coastal Athletic Association (CAA).

The Cougars finished the season 22–10, 13–5 in CAA play, to finish in a tie for third place. They were upset by Towson in the quarterfinals of the CAA tournament. They received an at-large bid to the WNIT, where they defeated USC Upstate in the first round, before falling to Illinois State in the second round.

== Previous season ==
The Cougars finished the 2022–23 season 11–18, 6–12 in CAA play, to finish in tenth place. As the #10 seed in the CAA tournament, they were defeated by #7 seed Monmouth in the second round.

== Roster ==
2023–24 Charleston Cougars women's basketball team
Players
Coaches

Pos.	#	Name	Height	Year	Previous school	Hometown
G	0	Taylor Barbot	5 ft 9 in (1.75 m)	Fr	St. Mary's High School	Floral Park, NY
G	1	Jami Hill	5 ft 11 in (1.8 m)	Fr	St. Andrew's School	Kingston, RI
G	3	Marissa Brown	6 ft 0 in (1.83 m)	So	Choctawhatchee High School	Fort Walton Beach, FL
G	4	Alexis Andrews	5 ft 8 in (1.73 m)	So	Park Crossing High School	Montgomery, AL
G	5	Taryn Barbot	5 ft 10 in (1.78 m)	Fr	St. Mary's High School	Floral Park, NY
G/F	11	Naylee Cortes	5 ft 9 in (1.75 m)	So	Central Pointe Christian Academy	Bogotá, Colombia
G	12	Jada Logan	5 ft 9 in (1.75 m)	Sr	USC Upstate	Rutherfordton, NC
F/C	13	Lara Rohkohl	6 ft 3 in (1.91 m)	So	Central Connecticut	Hanover, Germany
G	14	Jaila Roberts	5 ft 6 in (1.68 m)	Sr	East Tennessee State	Cantonment, FL
G/F	20	Anika McGarity	6 ft 1 in (1.85 m)	Sr	Smithson Valley High School	San Antonio, TX
G	21	Jenna Annecchiarico	5 ft 6 in (1.68 m)	Sr	Eastern Michigan	Baldwin, NY
F	22	Nicole Hemphill	6 ft 0 in (1.83 m)	Sr	Lipscomb	San Antonio, TX
G	23	Jazmyn Stone	5 ft 6 in (1.68 m)	So	Annie Wright Schools	Tacoma, WA
F	24	Adaora Onwumelu	6 ft 2 in (1.88 m)	Sr	Auburn	Douglasville, GA
F	32	Zoe McCrary	6 ft 2 in (1.88 m)	Sr	Allen High School	Allen, TX

Head coach

- Robin Harmony (Miami (FL))

Assistant coach(es)

- Randy Schneider (FIU)
- Yannick Denson (Lamar)
- Tiffany Conner (South Florida)
- Chastadie Barrs (Lamar)

Legend

- (C) Team captain
- (S) Suspended
- (I) Ineligible
- (W) Walk-on
- Injured
- Current redshirt

Roster
Last update: January 20, 2024

== Schedule and results ==
Date time, TV	Rank^{#}	Opponent^{#}	Result	Record	High points	High rebounds	High assists	Site (attendance) city, state
Non-conference regular season
November 6, 2023*; 11:00 a.m., FloHoops		Pfeiffer	W 117–30	1–0	29 – Logan	9 – Andrews	8 – Annecchiarico	TD Arena (3,267); Charleston, SC
November 10, 2023*; 9:30 p.m., MW Network		at UNLV	L 60–85	1–1	22 – Andrews	8 – Andrews	3 – Logan	Cox Pavilion (777); Paradise, NV
November 17, 2023*; 6:00 p.m., ESPN+		at Charleston Southern	W 70–60	2–1	19 – Andrews	8 – Rohkohl	8 – Annecchiarico	Buccaneer Field House (721); North Charleston, SC
November 20, 2023*; 7:00 p.m., FloHoops		Gardner–Webb	W 90–78	3–1	29 – Logan	10 – 2 tied	13 – Annecchiarico	TD Arena (285); Charleston, SC
November 25, 2023*; 2:00 p.m., FloHoops		North Carolina Wesleyan	W 112–40	4–1	21 – Andrews	8 – Rohkohl	8 – Annecchiarico	TD Arena (232); Charleston, SC
December 2, 2023*; 1:00 p.m., ESPN+		at Coastal Carolina	W 84–83 ^{OT}	5–1	27 – Annecchiarico	9 – Onwumelu	2 – Annecchiarico	HTC Center (565); Conway, SC
December 5, 2023*; 5:30 p.m., ESPN+		at Appalachian State	L 73–77	5–2	20 – Annecchiarico	9 – Onwumelu	3 – Annecchiarico	Holmes Center (318); Boone, NC
December 11, 2023*; 7:00 p.m., FloHoops		Jacksonville State	W 69–58	6–2	21 – Tar. Barbot	11 – Logan	4 – Annecchiarico	TD Arena (122); Charleston, SC
December 16, 2023*; 12:00 p.m., ESPN+		at Robert Morris	L 65–71	6–3	18 – Tar. Barbot	8 – Rohkohl	6 – Annecchiarico	UPMC Events Center (207); Moon Township, PA
December 19, 2023*; 7:00 p.m., FloHoops		South Carolina State	W 84–64	7–3	32 – Andrews	8 – Andrews	14 – Annecchiarico	TD Arena (315); Charleston, SC
December 21, 2023*; 12:00 p.m., FloHoops		Radford	W 74–50	8–3	24 – Tar. Barbot	5 – 2 tied	9 – Annecchiarico	TD Arena (333); Charleston, SC
CAA regular season
January 5, 2024; 6:00 p.m., FloHoops		at North Carolina A&T	W 63–58	9–3 (1–0)	20 – Annecchiarico	7 – Logan	5 – Annecchiarico	Corbett Sports Center (906); Greensboro, NC
January 7, 2024; 1:00 p.m., FloHoops		at Elon	W 57–45	10–3 (2–0)	22 – Tar. Barbot	11 – McCrary	2 – 4 tied	Schar Center (762); Elon, NC
January 12, 2024; 7:00 p.m., FloHoops		Drexel	W 60–48	11–3 (3–0)	17 – Andrews	7 – McCrary	6 – Annecchiarico	TD Arena (420); Charleston, SC
January 14, 2024; 2:00 p.m., FloHoops		Monmouth	L 62–75	11–4 (3–1)	36 – Tar. Barbot	9 – McCrary	4 – Tay. Barbot	TD Arena (517); Charleston, SC
January 19, 2024; 6:30 p.m., FloHoops		at Stony Brook	L 71–81	11–5 (3–2)	22 – Annecchiarico	9 – Tar. Barbot	5 – Annecchiarico	Island Federal Arena (1,317); Stony Brook, NY
January 21, 2024; 1:00 p.m., FloHoops		at Northeastern	W 83–46	12–5 (4–2)	26 – Tar. Barbot	7 – Cortes	5 – Annecchiarico	Cabot Center (241); Boston, MA
January 28, 2024; 1:00 p.m., FloHoops		UNC Wilmington	W 94–59	13–5 (5–2)	22 – Andrews	8 – Cortes	10 – Annecchiarico	TD Arena (401); Charleston, SC
February 2, 2024; 7:00 p.m., FloHoops		Hampton	W 86–57	14–5 (6–2)	25 – Logan	9 – Annecchiarico	8 – Annecchiarico	TD Arena (424); Charleston, SC
February 4, 2024; 1:00 p.m., FloHoops		at Towson	L 59–66	14–6 (6–3)	22 – Tar. Barbot	8 – McCrary	5 – Annecchiarico	SECU Arena (1,550); Towson, MD
February 9, 2024; 7:00 p.m., FloHoops		North Carolina A&T	W 66–62	15–6 (7–3)	20 – Annecchiarico	11 – Tar. Barbot	7 – Annecchiarico	TD Arena (452); Charleston, SC
February 11, 2024; 2:00 p.m., FloHoops		Campbell	W 65–51	16–6 (8–3)	17 – 2 tied	6 – McCrary	7 – Annecchiarico	TD Arena (425); Charleston, SC
February 18, 2024; 1:00 p.m., FloHoops		at UNC Wilmington	W 97–58	17–6 (9–3)	26 – Annecchiarico	16 – McCrary	4 – 2 tied	Trask Coliseum (827); Wilmington, NC
February 23, 2024; 7:00 p.m., FloHoops		at Hofstra	W 88–59	18–6 (10–3)	24 – Logan	13 – Tar. Barbot	5 – Annecchiarico	Mack Sports Complex (519); Hempstead, NY
February 25, 2024; 2:00 p.m., FloHoops		at Monmouth	L 63–73	18–7 (10–4)	26 – Logan	9 – 2 tied	1 – 3 tied	OceanFirst Bank Center (816); West Long Branch, NJ
March 1, 2024; 7:00 p.m., FloHoops		Towson	L 55–67	18–8 (10–5)	25 – Logan	7 – 2 tied	2 – 3 tied	TD Arena (312); Charleston, SC
March 3, 2024; 2:00 p.m., FloHoops		William & Mary	W 77–72	19–8 (11–5)	21 – Annecchiarico	8 – Brown	6 – Annecchiarico	TD Arena (358); Charleston, SC
March 7, 2024; 7:00 p.m., FloHoops		at Campbell	W 60–57	20–8 (12–5)	24 – Annecchiarico	8 – Andrews	2 – Annecchiarico	Gore Arena (906); Buies Creek, NC
March 9, 2024; 2:00 p.m., FloHoops		Delaware; Senior Day	W 102–77	21–8 (13–5)	30 – Andrews	12 – Logan	5 – Annecchiarico	TD Arena (438); Charleston, SC
CAA tournament
March 15, 2024; 7:30 p.m., FloHoops	(3)	vs. (6) Towson; Quarterfinals	L 60–69	21–9	24 – Logan	9 – Tar. Barbot	5 – Annecchiarico	Entertainment and Sports Arena (900); Washington, D.C.
WNIT
March 21, 2024*; 7:00 p.m., ESPN+		at USC Upstate; First round	W 78–60	22–9	34 – Logan	10 – Logan	7 – Annecchiarico	G.B. Hodge Center (404); Spartanburg, SC
March 24, 2024*; 5:00 p.m., ESPN+		at Illinois State; Second round	L 67–74	22–10	26 – Annecchiarico	11 – McCrary	4 – Annecchiarico	CEFCU Arena (1,537); Normal, IL
*Non-conference game. ^{#}Rankings from AP poll. (#) Tournament seedings in parentheses. All times are in Eastern.
