= 2023–24 Elon Phoenix women's basketball team =

American college basketball season

2023–24 Elon Phoenix women's basketball
- Conference: Coastal Athletic Association
- Record: 11–21 (7–11 CAA)
- Head coach: Charlotte Smith (13th season)
- Associate head coach: Josh Wick
- Assistant coaches: Edgar Farmer Jr.; Essence Baucom
- Home arena: Schar Center

2023–24 CAA women's basketball standings
	Conf.				Overall
Team	W		L	PCT	W		L	PCT
Stony Brook	16	–	2	.889	28	–	5	.848
Monmouth	14	–	4	.778	22	–	10	.688
Charleston	13	–	5	.722	22	–	10	.688
North Carolina A&T	13	–	5	.722	22	–	12	.647
William & Mary	12	–	6	.667	15	–	14	.517
Towson	11	–	7	.611	20	–	11	.645
Drexel †	10	–	8	.556	19	–	15	.559
Campbell	9	–	9	.500	17	–	14	.548
Elon	7	–	11	.389	11	–	21	.344
Delaware	7	–	11	.389	11	–	20	.355
Northeastern	5	–	13	.278	10	–	17	.370
Hampton	3	–	15	.167	3	–	26	.103
Hofstra	3	–	15	.167	11	–	21	.344
UNC Wilmington	3	–	15	.167	5	–	25	.167
† 2024 CAA tournament winner

The 2023–24 Elon Phoenix women's basketball team represented Elon University during the 2023–24 NCAA Division I women's basketball season. The Phoenix, led by 13th-year head coach Charlotte Smith, played their home games at the Schar Center in Elon, North Carolina as members of the Coastal Athletic Association.

== Previous season ==
The Phoenix finished the 2022–23 season 9–21, 5–13 in CAA play to finish in eleventh place. As the #11 seed in the CAA tournament, they were defeated by #6 seed Stony Brook in the second round.

== Roster ==
2023–24 Elon Phoenix women's basketball team
Players
Coaches

Pos.	#	Name	Height	Year	Previous school	Hometown
F/C	0	Ava Leroux	6 ft 4 in (1.93 m)	Fr	South Fayette High School	Bridgeville, Pennsylvania
G	1	Regina Walton	5 ft 3 in (1.6 m)	So	Seton High School	Capitol Heights, Maryland
F	2	Iycez Adams	6 ft 0 in (1.83 m)	Jr	Quality Education School	Greensboro, North Carolina
G	3	Jessica Booth	5 ft 8 in (1.73 m)	GS	McDonogh School	Columbia, Maryland
G	4	Maraja Pass	5 ft 4 in (1.63 m)	Fr	Winston Salem Christian School	Shelby, North Carolina
G	5	Raven Preston	5 ft 11 in (1.8 m)	So	Quality Education School	Greensboro, North Carolina
G	10	Kamryn Doty	5 ft 5 in (1.65 m)	RS So	AZ Compass	Tucson, Arizona
G	11	Ruby Willard	5 ft 10 in (1.78 m)	So	San Dieguito Academy	Encinitas, California
F	12	Ajia James	6 ft 1 in (1.85 m)	Sr	Saint Peter's	Stafford, Virginia
G	20	Diamond Monroe	5 ft 10 in (1.78 m)	RS So	James B. Dudley High School	Greensboro, North Carolina
G	22	Vanessa Taylor	5 ft 8 in (1.73 m)	GS	Hagagymnasiet	Norrköping, Sweden
F	24	Maya Johnson	6 ft 0 in (1.83 m)	GS	Southeast Raleigh High School	Raleigh, North Carolina
C	33	Aly Wadkovsky	6 ft 2 in (1.88 m)	So	Lake Norman High School	Denver, North Carolina
F/C	43	Hannah Dereje	6 ft 3 in (1.91 m)	So	Elizabeth Seton High School	Burtonsville, Maryland

Head coach

- Charlotte Smith (North Carolina)

Assistant coach(es)

- Josh Wick (North Carolina)
- Edgar Farmer Jr. (North Carolina)
- Essence Baucom (Elon)

Legend

- (C) Team captain
- (S) Suspended
- (I) Ineligible
- (W) Walk-on
- Injured
- Current redshirt

Roster
Last update: January 23, 2024

== Schedule and results ==
Date time, TV	Rank^{#}	Opponent^{#}	Result	Record	High points	High rebounds	High assists	Site (attendance) city, state
Exhibition
November 3, 2023*; 7:00 pm		Mars Hill	W 59–37	—	16 – Willard	7 – 2 Tied	5 – Pass	Schar Center; Elon, NC
Non-conference regular season
November 6, 2023*; 7:00 pm, FloHoops		East Carolina	L 37–68	0–1	10 – Leroux	7 – Leroux	4 – Pass	Schar Center (692); Elon, NC
November 11, 2023*; 1:00 pm, ESPN+		at Gardner–Webb	W 90–69	1–1	16 – Pass	7 – Walton	6 – Walton	Paul Porter Arena (245); Boiling Springs, NC
November 15, 2023*; 7:00 pm, ACCNX		at No. 14 NC State	L 35–90	1–2	6 – 2 Tied	3 – 2 Tied	5 – Taylor	Reynolds Coliseum (4,402); Raleigh, NC
November 18, 2023*; 3:00 pm, ACCNX		at No. 17 North Carolina	L 39–68	1–3	8 – 2 Tied	8 – Adams	2 – Booth	Carmichael Arena (2,566); Chapel Hill, NC
November 22, 2023*; 2:30 pm		vs. Bradley; GSU Thanksgiving Tournament	L 59–66	1–4	18 – Adams	9 – Adams	7 – Pass	GSU Convocation Center (839); Atlanta, GA
November 23, 2023*; 12:00 pm, ESPN+		at Georgia State; GSU Thanksgiving Tournament	W 75–68	2–4	15 – Taylor	7 – Johnson	5 – Walton	GSU Convocation Center (771); Atlanta, GA
November 28, 2023*; 6:30 pm, ESPN+		at Old Dominion	L 29–60	2–5	9 – Walton	6 – Pass	2 – Pass	Chartway Arena (1,653); Norfolk, VA
December 2, 2023*; 1:00 pm, FloHoops		Wingate	L 53–72	2–6	13 – Adams	8 – Leroux	5 – Willard	Schar Center (422); Elon, NC
December 10, 2023*; 2:00 pm, ESPN+		at UNC Greensboro	L 47–52	2–7	16 – Pass	10 – Adams	4 – Pass	Fleming Gymnasium (317); Greensboro, NC
December 14, 2023*; 7:00 pm, ESPN+		at Furman	L 47–73	2–8	12 – Pass	4 – 4 Tied	4 – Pass	Timmons Arena (518); Greenville, SC
December 17, 2023*; 1:00 pm, FloHoops		Marshall	L 77–84	2–9	21 – Pass	10 – Adams	8 – Pass	Schar Center (594); Elon, NC
December 19, 2023*; 1:00 pm, FloHoops		Mount Olive	W 65–39	3–9	13 – 2 Tied	8 – Adams	7 – Pass	Schar Center (581); Elon, NC
December 30, 2023*; 4:00 pm, ESPN+		at High Point	W 74–66	4–9	20 – Pass	7 – Adams	8 – Pass	Qubein Center (1,488); High Point, NC
CAA regular season
January 5, 2024; 7:00 pm, FloHoops		Towson	L 53–58	4–10 (0–1)	13 – Adams	8 – 2 Tied	5 – Pass	Schar Center (601); Elon, NC
January 7, 2024; 1:00 pm, FloHoops		Charleston	L 45–57	4–11 (0–2)	14 – James	9 – Adams	5 – Pass	Schar Center (762); Elon, NC
January 12, 2024; 7:00 pm, FloHoops		at Campbell	W 45–44	5–11 (1–2)	10 – 2 Tied	8 – Taylor	2 – Booth	Gore Arena (1,023); Buies Creek, NC
January 14, 2024; 1:00 pm, FloHoops		William & Mary	L 43–62	5–12 (1–3)	13 – Adams	10 – Adams	4 – Pass	Schar Center (753); Elon, NC
January 19, 2024; 12:00 pm, FloHoops		at Monmouth	W 65–60	6–12 (2–3)	17 – Taylor	11 – Adams	5 – Booth	OceanFirst Bank Center (391); West Long Branch, NJ
January 21, 2024; 2:00 pm, FloHoops		at Hofstra	W 55–54	7–12 (3–3)	12 – 2 Tied	14 – Adams	6 – Booth	Mack Sports Complex (1,007); Hempstead, NY
January 28, 2024; 2:00 pm, FloHoops		at North Carolina A&T	L 42–56	7–13 (3–4)	9 – James	11 – Johnson	3 – Pass	Corbett Sports Center (1,059); Greensboro, NC
February 2, 2024; 11:00 am, FloHoops		Northeastern	L 46–51	7–14 (3–5)	13 – Adams	7 – Adams	5 – Pass	Schar Center (3,045); Elon, NC
February 4, 2024; 1:00 pm, FloHoops		Campbell	L 35–53	7–15 (3–6)	13 – Adams	8 – Adams	3 – Pass	Schar Center (719); Elon, NC
February 9, 2024; 7:00 pm, FloHoops		at Hampton	W 69–51	8–15 (4–6)	17 – James	12 – Adams	5 – Pass	Hampton Convocation Center (699); Hampton, VA
February 11, 2024; 1:00 pm, FloHoops		UNC Wilmington	L 58–60	8–16 (4–7)	17 – Monroe	6 – 2 Tied	7 – Walton	Schar Center (789); Elon, NC
February 16, 2024; 7:00 pm, FloHoops		at Northeastern	W 53–37	9–16 (5–7)	15 – Willard	9 – James	4 – 2 Tied	Cabot Center (201); Boston, MA
February 18, 2024; 1:00 pm, FloHoops		at Stony Brook	L 32–61	9–17 (5–8)	8 – Johnson	12 – James	3 – Walton	Island Federal Arena (1,310); Stony Brook, NY
February 23, 2024; 7:00 pm, FloHoops		at William & Mary	L 61–73	9–18 (5–9)	17 – Johnson	10 – Johnson	4 – Walton	Kaplan Arena (1,088); Williamsburg, VA
February 25, 2024; 2:00 pm, FloHoops		North Carolina A&T	L 46–77	9–19 (5–10)	12 – Johnson	10 – Johnson	2 – Walton	Schar Center (1,342); Elon, NC
March 3, 2024; 1:00 pm, FloHoops		at Delaware	W 54–49	10–19 (6–10)	12 – Taylor	7 – James	3 – Pass	Bob Carpenter Center (1,625); Newark, DE
March 7, 2024; 7:00 pm, FloHoops		Hofstra	W 74–62	11–19 (7–10)	20 – Adams	8 – James	3 – 4 Tied	Schar Center (812); Elon, NC
March 9, 2024; 12:00 pm, FloHoops		Drexel	L 43–56	11–20 (7–11)	13 – Adams	4 – 2 Tied	4 – Walton	Schar Center (809); Elon, NC
CAA tournament
March 14, 2024; 12:00 pm, FloHoops	(9)	vs. (8) Campbell; Second Round	L 52–67	11–21	17 – Adams	5 – James	2 – Pass	Entertainment and Sports Arena; Washington, D.C.
*Non-conference game. ^{#}Rankings from AP Poll. (#) Tournament seedings in parentheses. All times are in Eastern.
