= 2024 CAA women's basketball tournament =

U.S. collegiate basketball event

- Classification: Division I
- Season: 2023–24
- Teams: 14
- Site: Entertainment and Sports Arena; Washington, D.C.
- Champions: Drexel (3rd title)
- Winning coach: Amy Mallon (2nd title)
- MVP: Amaris Baker (Drexel)
- Television: FloHoops, CBSSN
- CAA women's basketball tournaments

2023–24 CAA women's basketball standings
	Conf.				Overall
Team	W		L	PCT	W		L	PCT
Stony Brook	16	–	2	.889	28	–	5	.848
Monmouth	14	–	4	.778	22	–	10	.688
Charleston	13	–	5	.722	22	–	10	.688
North Carolina A&T	13	–	5	.722	22	–	12	.647
William & Mary	12	–	6	.667	15	–	14	.517
Towson	11	–	7	.611	20	–	11	.645
Drexel †	10	–	8	.556	19	–	15	.559
Campbell	9	–	9	.500	17	–	14	.548
Elon	7	–	11	.389	11	–	21	.344
Delaware	7	–	11	.389	11	–	20	.355
Northeastern	5	–	13	.278	10	–	17	.370
Hampton	3	–	15	.167	3	–	26	.103
Hofstra	3	–	15	.167	11	–	21	.344
UNC Wilmington	3	–	15	.167	5	–	25	.167
† 2024 CAA tournament winner

The 2024 Coastal Athletic Association women's basketball tournament was the postseason women's college basketball tournament for the Coastal Athletic Association for the 2023–24 NCAA Division I women's basketball season. The tournament was held at the Entertainment and Sports Arena in Washington, D.C. from March 13–17. Drexel won the tournament and received the conference's automatic bid to the 2024 NCAA tournament.

This was the first women's basketball tournament held under the Coastal Athletic Association name.

== Seeds ==
All 14 CAA teams participated in the tournament. Teams were seeded by record within the conference, with a tiebreaker system to seed teams with identical conference records. The top 10 teams received a first-round bye and the top four teams received a double bye, automatically advancing them into the quarterfinals.

Seed	School	Conf.	Tiebreaker
1	Stony Brook	16–2	
2	Monmouth	14–4	
3	Charleston	13–5	2–0 vs. North Carolina A&T
4	North Carolina A&T	13–5	0–2 vs. Charleston
5	William & Mary	12–6	
6	Towson	11–7	
7	Drexel	10–8	
8	Campbell	9–9	
9	Elon	7–11	1–0 vs. Delaware
10	Delaware	7–11	0–1 vs. Elon
11	Northeastern	5–13	
12	Hampton	3–15	2–1 vs. Hofstra/UNCW
13	Hofstra	3–15	1–0 vs. UNC Wilmington
14	UNC Wilmington	3–15	0–1 vs. Hofstra

== Schedule ==
Session	Game	Time*	Matchup	Score	Television
First Round – Wednesday, March 13
1	1	2:30 pm	No. 12 Hampton vs. No. 13 Hofstra	55–71	FloHoops
1	2	5:00 pm	No. 11 Northeastern vs. No. 14 UNC Wilmington	66–60	FloHoops
Second Round – Thursday, March 14
2	3	12:00 pm	No. 8 Campbell vs. No. 9 Elon	67–52	FloHoops
2	4	2:30 pm	No. 5 William & Mary vs. No. 13 Hofstra	53–57	FloHoops
3	5	5:00 pm	No. 7 Drexel vs. No. 10 Delaware	57–55	FloHoops
3	6	7:30 pm	No. 6 Towson vs. No. 11 Northeastern	78–69	FloHoops
Quarterfinals – Friday, March 15
4	7	12:00 pm	No. 1 Stony Brook vs. No. 8 Campbell	61–52	FloHoops
4	8	2:30 pm	No. 4 North Carolina A&T vs. No. 13 Hofstra	55–40	FloHoops
5	9	5:00 pm	No. 2 Monmouth vs. No. 7 Drexel	56–58	FloHoops
5	10	7:30 pm	No. 3 Charleston vs. No. 6 Towson	60–69	FloHoops
Semifinals – Saturday, March 16
6	11	2:00 pm	No. 1 Stony Brook vs. No. 4 North Carolina A&T	59–51	FloHoops
6	12	4:30 pm	No. 7 Drexel vs. No. 6 Towson	69–68	FloHoops
Championship – Sunday, March 17
7	13	2:00 pm	No. 1 Stony Brook vs. No. 7 Drexel	60–68	CBSSN
*Game times in ET. Rankings denote tournament seed

== Bracket ==
First Round; Wednesday, March 13; FloHoops
12	Hampton	55
13	Hofstra	71
11	Northeastern	66
14	UNC Wilmington	60

Second Round; Thursday, March 14; FloHoops
8	Campbell	67
9	Elon	52
5	William & Mary	53
13	Hofstra	57
7	Drexel	57
10	Delaware	55
6	Towson	78
11	Northeastern	69

Quarterfinals; Friday, March 15; FloHoops
1	Stony Brook	61
8	Campbell	52
4	North Carolina A&T	55
13	Hofstra	40
2	Monmouth	56
7	Drexel	58
3	Charleston	60
6	Towson	69

Semifinals; Saturday, March 16; FloHoops
1	Stony Brook	59
4	North Carolina A&T	51
7	Drexel	69
6	Towson	68

Championship; Sunday, March 17; CBS Sports Network
1	Stony Brook	60
7	Drexel	68

* denotes overtime game

== See also ==
- 2024 CAA men's basketball tournament
