= 2023–24 Delaware Fightin' Blue Hens women's basketball team =

American college basketball season

2023–24 Delaware Fightin' Blue Hens women's basketball
- Conference: Coastal Athletic Association
- Record: 11–20 (7–11 CAA)
- Head coach: Sarah Jenkins (2nd season)
- Assistant coaches: Sam Pierce Jr.; Bri Hutchen; Cody Gilmore
- Home arena: Bob Carpenter Center

2023–24 CAA women's basketball standings
	Conf.				Overall
Team	W		L	PCT	W		L	PCT
Stony Brook	16	–	2	.889	28	–	5	.848
Monmouth	14	–	4	.778	22	–	10	.688
Charleston	13	–	5	.722	22	–	10	.688
North Carolina A&T	13	–	5	.722	22	–	12	.647
William & Mary	12	–	6	.667	15	–	14	.517
Towson	11	–	7	.611	20	–	11	.645
Drexel †	10	–	8	.556	19	–	15	.559
Campbell	9	–	9	.500	17	–	14	.548
Elon	7	–	11	.389	11	–	21	.344
Delaware	7	–	11	.389	11	–	20	.355
Northeastern	5	–	13	.278	10	–	17	.370
Hampton	3	–	15	.167	3	–	26	.103
Hofstra	3	–	15	.167	11	–	21	.344
UNC Wilmington	3	–	15	.167	5	–	25	.167
† 2024 CAA tournament winner

The 2023–24 Delaware Fightin' Blue Hens women's basketball team represented the University of Delaware during the 2023–24 NCAA Division I women's basketball season. The Fightin' Blue Hens, led by second-year head coach Sarah Jenkins, played their home games at the Bob Carpenter Center in Newark, Delaware as members of the Coastal Athletic Association.

== Previous season ==
The Fightin' Blue Hens finished the 2022–23 season 16–14, 9–9 in Big West play to finish in a tie for seventh place. As the #8 seed in the CAA tournament, they were defeated by #9 seed Hampton in the second round.

== Roster ==
2023–24 Delaware Fightin' Blue Hens women's basketball team
Players
Coaches

Pos.	#	Name	Height	Year	Previous school	Hometown
G	0	Rebecca Demeke	6 ft 0 in (1.83 m)	Sr	Rhode Island	Toronto, Ontario
F	1	Michelle Ojo	6 ft 0 in (1.83 m)	Jr	George Washington	Virginia Beach, Virginia
G	2	Tara Cousins	5 ft 8 in (1.73 m)	Sr	New Hope Academy	Washington, D.C.
G	3	Mia Yanogacio	5 ft 7 in (1.7 m)	Jr	Rutgers Prep	Somerset, New Jersey
G	4	Nakiyah Mays-Prince	5 ft 5 in (1.65 m)	So	Example Academy	Chicago, Illinois
G	5	Grace Sundback	5 ft 9 in (1.75 m)	Fr	Westtown School	Staten Island, New York
G	10	Jada Thorpe	5 ft 9 in (1.75 m)	GS	Western Illinois	Chicago, Illinois
F	13	Arantxa Portalez	6 ft 2 in (1.88 m)	Fr	Romareda Agustinos Recoletos	Zaragoza, Spain
F	14	Chloe Wilson	5 ft 11 in (1.8 m)	Sr	Fairleigh Dickinson	Freeport, New York
F	15	Darrionna Howard	6 ft 0 in (1.83 m)	Fr	Clayton High School	Smithfield, North Carolina
C	21	Ande'a Cherisier	6 ft 1 in (1.85 m)	Fr	Saint Frances Academy	Baltimore, Maryland
G	22	Sydney Boone	5 ft 8 in (1.73 m)	Jr	Richmond	Richmond, Virginia
G	23	Jadaia Reid	5 ft 9 in (1.75 m)	Sr	Crestwood Preparatory College	Brampton, Ontario
C	25	Klarke Sconiers	6 ft 2 in (1.88 m)	Sr	Minnesota	Queens, New York

Head coach

- Sarah Jenkins (Georgetown)

Assistant coach(es)

- Sam Pierce Jr. (Slippery Rock)
- Bri Hutchen (Alabama)
- Cody Gilmore (Glenville State)

Legend

- (C) Team captain
- (S) Suspended
- (I) Ineligible
- (W) Walk-on
- Injured
- Current redshirt

Roster
Last update: January 25, 2024

== Schedule and results ==
Date time, TV	Rank^{#}	Opponent^{#}	Result	Record	High points	High rebounds	High assists	Site (attendance) city, state
Non-conference regular season
November 9, 2023*; 7:00 pm, FloHoops		Longwood	W 81–55	1–0	18 – Wilson	12 – 2 Tied	4 – Boone	Bob Carpenter Center (1,115); Newark, DE
November 14, 2023*; 7:00 pm, DSN/FloHoops		Lehigh	L 77–78	1–1	33 – Sconiers	16 – Howard	5 – Mays-Prince	Bob Carpenter Center (1,124); Newark, DE
November 24, 2023*; 5:00 pm, FloHoops		vs. Florida Gulf Coast; Gulf Coast Showcase first round	L 68–83	1–2	22 – Cousins	8 – Cherisier	3 – 2 Tied	Hertz Arena (1,034); Estero, FL
November 25, 2023*; 1:30 pm, FloHoops		vs. Purdue Fort Wayne; Gulf Coast Showcase consolation 2nd round	L 74–88	1–3	17 – Sconiers	6 – Boone	5 – Boone	Hertz Arena (356); Estero, FL
November 26, 2023*; 11:00 am, FloHoops		vs. Vermont; Gulf Coast Showcase 7th place game	W 73–66	2–3	22 – Cousins	7 – Wilson	4 – Wilson	Hertz Arena (177); Estero, FL
November 29, 2023*; 7:00 pm, ESPN+		at American	W 68–58	3–3	23 – Cousins	9 – Cousins	2 – 6 Tied	Bender Arena (432); Washington, D.C.
December 3, 2023*; 2:00 pm, ESPN+		at Duquesne	W 74–57	4–3	23 – Cousins	6 – Sconiers	2 – 4 Tied	UPMC Cooper Fieldhouse (819); Pittsburgh, PA
December 7, 2023*; 7:00 pm, DSN/FloHoops		Old Dominion	L 53–57	4–4	19 – Boone	10 – Sconiers	2 – 2 Tied	Bob Carpenter Center (1,325); Newark, DE
December 11, 2023*; 7:00 pm, ESPN+		vs. VCU	L 55–64	4–5	15 – Cousins	7 – 2 Tied	2 – Cousins	Henrico Sports & Events Center (1,014); Henrico, VA
December 14, 2023*; 7:00 pm, ESPN+		at Temple	L 65–72	4–6	16 – Boone	11 – Wilson	4 – Cousins	Liacouras Center (1,109); Philadelphia, PA
December 21, 2023*; 2:00 pm		at Delaware State	L 66–69	4–7	22 – Cousins	10 – Mays-Prince	4 – Cousins	Memorial Hall (250); Dover, DE
December 31, 2023*; 2:00 pm, FloHoops		Harvard	L 58–88	4–8	15 – Sconiers	7 – Cherisier	5 – Boone	Bob Carpenter Center (1,174); Newark, DE
CAA regular season
January 5, 2024; 7:00 pm, FloHoops		at Northeastern	W 86–73	5–8 (1–0)	21 – Wilson	10 – Wilson	6 – Boone	Cabot Center (264); Boston, MA
January 7, 2024; 2:00 pm, DSN/FloHoops		Hampton	W 76–61	6–8 (2–0)	16 – Wilson	8 – Sconiers	4 – 3 Tied	Bob Carpenter Center (1,151); Newark, DE
January 14, 2024; 2:00 pm, NBCSPHI/SNY/FloHoops		Stony Brook	L 67–79	6–9 (2–1)	16 – Sconiers	10 – Howard	5 – Mays-Prince	Bob Carpenter Center (1,185); Newark, DE
January 19, 2024; 7:00 pm, FloHoops		at William & Mary	L 72–78 ^{OT}	6–10 (2–2)	19 – Cousins	6 – Boone	4 – Mays-Prince	Kaplan Arena (456); Williamsburg, VA
January 21, 2024; 1:00 pm, FloHoops		at North Carolina A&T	L 62–65	6–11 (2–3)	13 – Sundback	5 – 3 Tied	5 – Cousins	Corbett Sports Center (1,003); Greensboro, NC
January 26, 2024; 7:00 pm, FloHoops		Northeastern	L 66–73	6–12 (2–4)	14 – Cherisier	5 – Howard	3 – Boone	Bob Carpenter Center (1,288); Newark, DE
January 28, 2024; 2:00 pm, FloHoops/NBCSPHI		Towson	W 73–59	7–12 (3–4)	21 – Cherisier	15 – Wilson	3 – Wilson	Bob Carpenter Center (1,284); Newark, DE
February 2, 2024; 6:00 pm, FloHoops/NBCSPHI		at Drexel	L 49–53	7–13 (3–5)	17 – Wilson	10 – Wilson	4 – 2 Tied	Daskalakis Athletic Center (602); Philadelphia, PA
February 4, 2024; 2:00 pm, FloHoops		at Hofstra	W 82–59	8–13 (4–5)	17 – Cherisier	7 – Cherisier	3 – 3 Tied	Mack Sports Complex (603); Hempstead, NY
February 9, 2024; 7:00 pm, FloHoops		William & Mary	L 58–62	8–14 (4–6)	9 – Cousins	12 – Wilson	3 – Boone	Bob Carpenter Center (1,443); Newark, DE
February 11, 2024; 2:00 pm, NBCSPHI/SNY/FloHoops		at Monmouth	W 71–67	9–14 (5–6)	14 – Demeke	7 – Wilson	6 – Boone	OceanFirst Bank Center (793); West Long Branch, NJ
February 18, 2024; 2:00 pm, FloHoops/NBCSPHI		Drexel	L 59–61	9–15 (5–7)	18 – Demeke	7 – Howard	8 – Boone	Bob Carpenter Center (1,842); Newark, DE
February 23, 2024; 7:00 pm, DSN/FloHoops		UNC Wilmington	W 73–35	10–15 (6–7)	20 – Demeke	9 – Sconiers	6 – Mays-Prince	Bob Carpenter Center (1,217); Newark, DE
February 25, 2024; 2:00 pm, FloHoops		at Towson	L 57–70	10–16 (6–8)	23 – Wilson	9 – Wilson	3 – Mays-Prince	SECU Arena (715); Towson, MD
March 1, 2024; 7:00 pm, DSN/FloHoops		Campbell	L 65–66	10–17 (6–9)	22 – Wilson	6 – 2 Tied	4 – Sundback	Bob Carpenter Center (1,094); Newark, DE
March 3, 2024; 1:00 pm, DSN/FloHoops		Elon	L 49–54	10–18 (6–10)	15 – 3 Tied	7 – 2 Tied	5 – Mays-Prince	Bob Carpenter Center (1,625); Newark, DE
March 7, 2024; 7:00 pm, FloHoops		at UNC Wilmington	W 81–51	11–18 (7–10)	14 – Mays-Prince	9 – Wilson	4 – Sundback	Trask Coliseum (522); Wilmington, NC
March 9, 2024; 2:00 pm, FloHoops		at Charleston	L 77–102	11–19 (7–11)	16 – Wilson	6 – Wilson	5 – Mays-Prince	TD Arena (438); Charleston, SC
CAA tournament
March 14, 2024; 5:00 pm, FloHoops	(10)	vs. (7) Drexel; Second Round	L 55–57	11–20	11 – Demeke	11 – 2 Tied	3 – Demeke	Entertainment and Sports Arena; Washington, D.C.
*Non-conference game. ^{#}Rankings from AP Poll. (#) Tournament seedings in parentheses. All times are in Eastern.
