= 2023–24 Monmouth Hawks women's basketball team =

American college basketball season

2023–24 Monmouth Hawks women's basketball
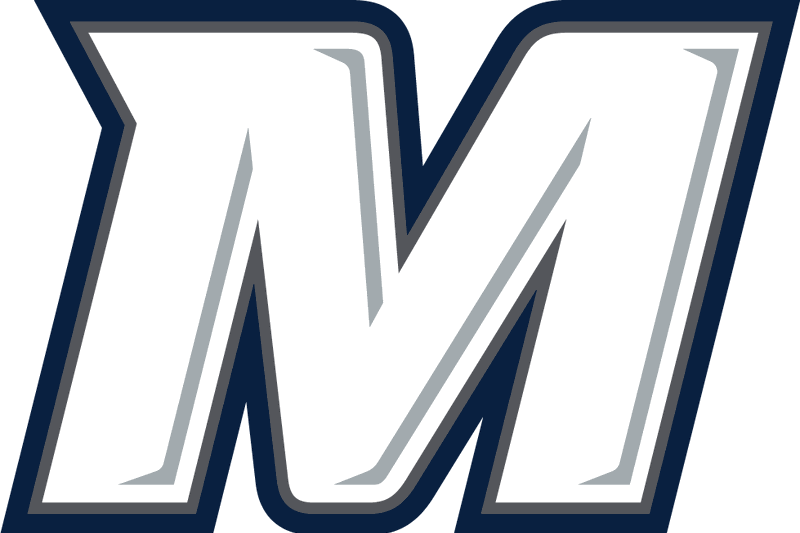

WNIT, second round
- Conference: Coastal Athletic Association
- Record: 22–10 (14–4 CAA)
- Head coach: Ginny Boggess (3rd season)
- Assistant coaches: Anjalé Barrett; Sean Bair; Geoff Lanier
- Home arena: OceanFirst Bank Center

2023–24 CAA women's basketball standings
	Conf.				Overall
Team	W		L	PCT	W		L	PCT
Stony Brook	16	–	2	.889	28	–	5	.848
Monmouth	14	–	4	.778	22	–	10	.688
Charleston	13	–	5	.722	22	–	10	.688
North Carolina A&T	13	–	5	.722	22	–	12	.647
William & Mary	12	–	6	.667	15	–	14	.517
Towson	11	–	7	.611	20	–	11	.645
Drexel †	10	–	8	.556	19	–	15	.559
Campbell	9	–	9	.500	17	–	14	.548
Elon	7	–	11	.389	11	–	21	.344
Delaware	7	–	11	.389	11	–	20	.355
Northeastern	5	–	13	.278	10	–	17	.370
Hampton	3	–	15	.167	3	–	26	.103
Hofstra	3	–	15	.167	11	–	21	.344
UNC Wilmington	3	–	15	.167	5	–	25	.167
† 2024 CAA tournament winner

The 2023–24 Monmouth Hawks women's basketball team represented Monmouth University during the 2023–24 NCAA Division I women's basketball season. The Hawks, led by third-year head coach Ginny Boggess, played their home games at OceanFirst Bank Center in West Long Branch, New Jersey, as members of the Coastal Athletic Association (CAA).

== Previous season ==
The Hawks finished the 2022–23 season 18–16, 9–9 in CAA play, to finish in a tie for seventh place. As the #7 seed in the CAA tournament, they defeated #10 seed Charleston in the second round, upset #2 seed Drexel, #3 seed Northeastern and top-seeded Towson to become the lowest-seeded team to ever win the CAA tournament, doing it in their first season in the CAA, sending the Hawks to just their second NCAA tournament appearance, their first since 1983. They earned the CAA's automatic bid into the NCAA tournament, receiving the #16 seed in the Greenville Regional 2. They were defeated by Tennessee Tech in the First Four.

== Roster ==
2023–24 Monmouth Hawks women's basketball team
Players
Coaches

Pos.	#	Name	Height	Year	Previous school	Hometown
G	0	Diamond Wiggins	5 ft 10 in (1.78 m)	Fr	Norview High School	Norfolk, VA
G	1	Ariana Vanderhoop	5 ft 9 in (1.75 m)	Sr	Cathedral High School	Boston, MA
F	2	Taisha Exanor	6 ft 0 in (1.83 m)	Sr	Pittsburgh	Châteauguay, QC
G	3	Sandrine Clesca	5 ft 9 in (1.75 m)	Sr	Pittsburgh	Laval, QC
G	4	Kaci Donovan	6 ft 1 in (1.85 m)	Sr	Penn State	Owego, NY
G	5	Antonia Panayides	5 ft 7 in (1.7 m)	Jr	Red Bank Catholic High School	Tinton Falls, NJ
G	7	Isabella Murray	5 ft 9 in (1.75 m)	Fr	Blair Academy	Green Brook, NJ
G	9	Rosalie Mercille	5 ft 9 in (1.75 m)	Fr	Cégep de Saint-Jean-sur-Richelieu	Quebec City, QC
F	13	Divine Dibula	6 ft 1 in (1.85 m)	Fr	Champlain College Saint-Lambert	Ottawa, ON
G	14	Kellyn Preira	5 ft 11 in (1.8 m)	Fr	St. Mary's High School	Peabody, MA
G	15	Amiya Carroll	5 ft 11 in (1.8 m)	So	Sanford School	Smyrna, DE
G	20	Jania Hall	5 ft 8 in (1.73 m)	Sr	St. Vincent Pallotti High School	Gaithersburg, MD
G	22	Jaye Haynes	5 ft 8 in (1.73 m)	Sr	La Salle	North Wales, PA
F	23	Ella Farrelly	6 ft 3 in (1.91 m)	So	King's Christian Collegiate	Oakville, ON
C	24	Belle Kranbuhl	6 ft 3 in (1.91 m)	Sr	Adirondack Central High School	Boonville, NY
F	32	Kayla Richardson	5 ft 11 in (1.8 m)	Sr	La Salle	Red Bank, NJ

Head coach

- Ginny Boggess (Wingate)

Assistant coach(es)

- Anjalé Barrett (Maryland)
- Sean Bair (Dickinson)
- Geoff Lanier (Southern Connecticut)

Legend

- (C) Team captain
- (S) Suspended
- (I) Ineligible
- (W) Walk-on
- Injured
- Current redshirt

Roster
Last update: January 22, 2024

== Schedule and results ==
Date time, TV	Rank^{#}	Opponent^{#}	Result	Record	High points	High rebounds	High assists	Site (attendance) city, state
Non-conference regular season
November 6, 2023*; 7:00 p.m., B1G+		at Rutgers	L 51–56	0–1	14 – Vanderhoop	7 – Vanderhoop	3 – Donovan	Jersey Mike's Arena (1,403); Piscataway, NJ
November 10, 2023*; 7:00 p.m., FloHoops		St. John's	W 74–69	1–1	15 – Haynes	8 – Kranbuhl	4 – Vanderhoop	OceanFirst Bank Center (921); West Long Branch, NJ
November 15, 2023*; 7:00 p.m., FloHoops		Sacred Heart	L 50–59	1–2	12 – Donovan	10 – Exanor	5 – Kranbuhl	OceanFirst Bank Center (577); West Long Branch, NJ
November 19, 2023*; 2:00 p.m., FloHoops/NBCSPHI		UMass	W 74–62	2–2	16 – 2 tied	11 – Farrelly	4 – 2 tied	OceanFirst Bank Center (601); West Long Branch, NJ
November 22, 2023*; 2:00 p.m., FloHoops		at Providence	L 40–57	2–3	10 – Vanderhoop	9 – Kranbuhl	2 – Hall	Alumni Hall (515); Providence, RI
November 26, 2023*; 2:00 p.m., FloHoops/SNY		Brown	L 58–59	2–4	15 – Donovan	7 – Kranbuhl	3 – Clesca	OceanFirst Bank Center (605); West Long Branch, NJ
December 2, 2023*; 2:00 p.m., ESPN+		at Rider	W 62–42	3–4	23 – Donovan	6 – Kranbuhl	6 – Kranbuhl	Alumni Gymnasium (572); Lawrenceville, NJ
December 6, 2023*; 7:00 p.m., ESPN+		at American	W 72–60	4–4	18 – Hall	5 – 5 tied	3 – Hall	Bender Arena (212); Washington, D.C.
December 11, 2023*; 6:00 p.m., ESPN+		at Lafayette	W 68–47	5–4	17 – Donovan	6 – Clesca	4 – Clesca	Kirby Sports Center (432); Easton, PA
December 22, 2023*; 2:00 p.m., FloHoops		Loyola (MD)	W 63–50	6–4	18 – Donovan	11 – Kranbuhl	4 – Hall	OceanFirst Bank Center (597); West Long Branch, NJ
January 1, 2024*; 2:00 p.m., FloHoops		Georgian Court	W 91–51	7–4	20 – 2 tied	12 – Kranbuhl	5 – 2 tied	OceanFirst Bank Center (479); West Long Branch, NJ
CAA regular season
January 5, 2024; 7:00 p.m., FloHoops/NBCSPHI		William & Mary	L 66–70	7–5 (0–1)	23 – Donovan	8 – Donovan	7 – Clesca	OceanFirst Bank Center (680); West Long Branch, NJ
January 7, 2024; 2:00 p.m., FloHoops		Campbell	W 49–47	7–6 (1–1)	11 – Donovan	8 – Exanor	3 – Hall	OceanFirst Bank Center (550); West Long Branch, NJ
January 14, 2024; 2:00 p.m., FloHoops		at Charleston	W 75–62	9–5 (2–1)	15 – Vanderhoop	18 – Kranbuhl	7 – Clesca	TD Arena (517); Charleston, SC
January 19, 2024; 12:00 p.m., FloHoops		Elon	L 60–65	9–6 (2–2)	16 – Donovan	7 – Donovan	3 – 2 tied	OceanFirst Bank Center (391); West Long Branch, NJ
January 21, 2024; 1:00 p.m., FloHoops/NBCSPHI		at Drexel	W 63–55	10–6 (3–2)	12 – Vanderhoop	7 – Kranbuhl	3 – 2 tied	Daskalakis Athletic Center (637); Philadelphia, PA
January 26, 2024; 7:00 p.m., FloHoops		at Hampton	W 69–61	11–6 (4–2)	15 – Hall	12 – Vanderhoop	3 – 2 tied	Hampton Convocation Center (682); Hampton, VA
January 28, 2024; 1:00 p.m., FloHoops		at William & Mary	W 67–56	12–6 (5–2)	15 – Clesca	10 – Exanor	3 – 2 tied	Kaplan Arena (1,354); Williamsburg, VA
February 2, 2024; 7:00 p.m., FloHoops		Towson	W 64–53	13–6 (6–2)	16 – Mercille	8 – Donovan	4 – Donovan	OceanFirst Bank Center (870); West Long Branch, NJ
February 4, 2024; 2:00 p.m., FloHoops/SNY/NBCSPHI		Stony Brook	L 62–78	13–7 (6–3)	18 – Donovan	6 – Kranbuhl	2 – 2 tied	OceanFirst Bank Center (1,781); West Long Branch, NJ
February 9, 2024; 12:00 p.m., FloHoops/NESN		at Northeastern	W 50–41	14–7 (7–3)	11 – Hall	9 – Kranbuhl	3 – 2 tied	Cabot Center (1,172); Boston, MA
February 11, 2024; 2:00 p.m., FloHoops/SNY/NBCSPHI		Delaware	L 67–71	14–8 (7–4)	17 – Donovan	10 – Vanderhoop	4 – Vanderhoop	OceanFirst Bank Center (793); West Long Branch, NJ
February 16, 2024; 7:00 p.m., FloHoops		at Campbell	W 53–49	15–8 (8–4)	10 – Vanderhoop	11 – Kranbuhl	2 – Mercille	Gore Arena (856); Buies Creek, NC
February 18, 2024; 2:00 p.m., FloHoops		at North Carolina A&T	W 80–76 ^{2OT}	16–8 (9–4)	21 – Hall	10 – Kranbuhl	4 – Hall	Corbett Sports Center (1,048); Greensboro, NC
February 23, 2024; 7:00 p.m., FloHoops/NBCSPHI		Drexel	W 61–55	17–8 (10–4)	21 – Vanderhoop	11 – Exanor	4 – Hall	OceanFirst Bank Center (696); West Long Branch, NJ
February 25, 2024; 2:00 p.m., FloHoops		Charleston	W 73–63	18–8 (11–4)	26 – Vanderhoop	14 – Kranbuhl	3 – Clesca	OceanFirst Bank Center (816); West Long Branch, NJ
March 3, 2024; 2:00 p.m., FloHoops		at Hofstra	W 66–50	19–8 (12–4)	13 – Hall	7 – 2 tied	3 – Exanor	Mack Sports Complex (546); Hempstead, NY
March 7, 2024; 7:00 p.m., FloHoops		at Towson	W 70–64	20–8 (13–4)	20 – Mercille	8 – Exanor	3 – Kranbuhl	SECU Arena (825); Towson, MD
March 9, 2024; 3:00 p.m., FloHoops/SNY		UNC Wilmington	W 65–53	21–8 (14–4)	12 – Exanor	18 – Exanor	3 – Richardson	OceanFirst Bank Center (706); West Long Branch, NJ
CAA tournament
March 15, 2024; 5:00 p.m., FloHoops	(2)	vs. (7) Drexel; Quarterfinals	L 56–58	21–9	16 – Vanderhoop	8 – Exanor	5 – Clesca	Entertainment and Sports Arena; Washington, D.C.
WNIT
March 21, 2024; 6:00 p.m., ESPN+		at Buffalo; First round	W 68–58	22–9	16 – Exanor	12 – Kranbuhl	5 – Clesca	Alumni Arena (710); Amherst, NY
March 25, 2024; 6:00 p.m., ESPN+		at Duquesne; Second round	L 65–69 ^{OT}	22–10	18 – Vanderhoop	10 – Kranbuhl	4 – Vanderhoop	UPMC Cooper Fieldhouse (1,625); Pittsburgh, PA
*Non-conference game. ^{#}Rankings from AP poll. (#) Tournament seedings in parentheses. All times are in Eastern.
