= 2024–25 Duquesne Dukes women's basketball team =

American college basketball season

2024–25 Duquesne Dukes women's basketball

WNIT, Super 16
- Conference: Atlantic 10 Conference
- Record: 21–13 (9–9 A–10)
- Head coach: Dan Burt (12th season)
- Assistant coaches: Vanessa Abel; Aurielle Anderson; Rick Bell; RJ Bell; Frank Ferraro
- Home arena: UPMC Cooper Fieldhouse

2024–25 Atlantic 10 women's basketball standings
	Conf.				Overall
Team	W		L	PCT	W		L	PCT
Richmond	17	–	1	.944	28	–	7	.800
George Mason †	14	–	4	.778	27	–	6	.818
Davidson	13	–	5	.722	19	–	14	.576
Saint Joseph's	12	–	6	.667	24	–	10	.706
Rhode Island	11	–	7	.611	17	–	16	.515
Dayton	11	–	7	.611	18	–	13	.581
UMass	11	–	7	.611	17	–	15	.531
Fordham	9	–	9	.500	15	–	15	.500
Duquesne	9	–	9	.500	21	–	13	.618
Saint Louis	7	–	11	.389	15	–	19	.441
VCU	6	–	12	.333	12	–	19	.387
George Washington	5	–	13	.278	13	–	18	.419
Loyola Chicago	5	–	13	.278	13	–	17	.433
La Salle	3	–	15	.167	10	–	23	.303
St. Bonaventure	2	–	16	.111	6	–	24	.200
† 2025 A10 tournament winner

The 2024–25 Duquesne Dukes women's basketball team represented Duquesne University during the 2024–25 NCAA Division I women's basketball season. The Dukes, led by 12th-year head coach Dan Burt, played their home games at the UPMC Cooper Fieldhouse in Pittsburgh, Pennsylvania, as members of the Atlantic 10 Conference.

== Previous season ==
The Dukes finished the 2023–24 season 21–13, 13–5 in A–10 play to finish in fifth place. They defeated UMass, and George Mason, before falling to top-seeded and eventual tournament champions Richmond in the semifinals of the A–10 tournament. They received an at-large bid to the WNIT, where they would defeat Monmouth in the second round, before falling to Purdue in the Super 16.

== Roster ==
2024–25 Duquesne Dukes women's basketball team
Players
Coaches

Pos.	#	Name	Height	Year	Previous school	Hometown
G	0	Gabby Hutcherson	6 ft 2 in (1.88 m)	GS	Pittsburgh	Westerville, Ohio
G	1	Jerni Kiaku	5 ft 7 in (1.7 m)	Jr	North Carolina Central	Garner, North Carolina
F	2	Kaitlyn Ammons	6 ft 3 in (1.91 m)	RS Jr	DePaul	Morgantown, West Virginia
G	3	Faith Walker	6 ft 1 in (1.85 m)	Fr	West York High School	York, Pennsylvania
G	4	Megan McConnell	5 ft 7 in (1.7 m)	Sr	Chartiers Valley High School	Pittsburgh, Pennsylvania
G	5	Fatou Sane	6 ft 0 in (1.83 m)	Fr	J. Addison School	Guédiawaye, Senegal
G	7	Reina Green	5 ft 8 in (1.73 m)	So	Pensacola State College	Fort Lauderdale, Florida
G	10	Gabby Grantham-Medley	5 ft 9 in (1.75 m)	So	North Hagerstown High School	Hagerstown, Maryland
G	11	Mackenzie Blackford	5 ft 8 in (1.73 m)	Fr	Solon High School	Solon, Ohio
G	12	Raymi Coueta	5 ft 8 in (1.73 m)	So	Cégep de Thetford	Cayenne, French Guiana
G	20	Kellie McConnell	5 ft 3 in (1.6 m)	Fr	North Allegheny High School	Pittsburgh, Pennsylvania
F	22	Kiandra Browne	6 ft 2 in (1.88 m)	Sr	Indiana	Montreal, Quebec
G	23	Nadia Moore	5 ft 10 in (1.78 m)	Fr	J. Addison School	Washington, Pennsylvania
G	30	Andjela Matic	5 ft 8 in (1.73 m)	Jr	Vermont	Ub, Serbia

Head coach

- Dan Burt (West Liberty)

Assistant coach(es)

- Vanessa Abel (Duquesne)
- Aurielle Anderson (Western Michigan)
- Rick Bell (Pittsburgh)
- RJ Bell (Geneva)
- Frank Ferraro (Duquesne)

Legend

- (C) Team captain
- (S) Suspended
- (I) Ineligible
- (W) Walk-on
- Injured
- Current redshirt

Roster
Last update: January 5, 2025

== Schedule and results ==
Date time, TV	Rank^{#}	Opponent^{#}	Result	Record	High points	High rebounds	High assists	Site (attendance) city, state
Non-conference regular season
November 4, 2024*; 5:00 pm, ESPN+		Princeton	W 76–66	1–0	24 – M. McConnell	5 – Browne	5 – M. McConnell	UPMC Cooper Fieldhouse (932); Pittsburgh, PA
November 10, 2024*; 1:00 pm, B1G+		at Penn State	L 83–92	1–1	21 – M. McConnell	10 – M. McConnell	7 – M. McConnell	Bryce Jordan Center (2,152); University Park, PA
November 16, 2024*; 7:00 pm, ESPN+		Niagara	W 100–65	2–1	24 – Kiaku	5 – Tied	6 – M. McConnell	UPMC Cooper Fieldhouse (835); Pittsburgh, PA
November 20, 2024*; 7:00 pm, ESPN+		at Kent State	L 61–81	2–2	19 – M. McConnell	10 – M. McConnell	5 – Matic	MAC Center (1,147); Kent, OH
November 25, 2024*; 6:00 pm, ESPN+		Robert Morris	W 77–61	3–2	15 – M. McConnell	10 – M. McConnell	10 – M. McConnell	UPMC Cooper Fieldhouse (888); Pittsburgh, PA
December 1, 2024*; 2:00 pm, SNP/ESPN+		Saint Francis	W 85–71	4–2	22 – Hutcherson	6 – Tied	7 – M. McConnell	UPMC Cooper Fieldhouse (688); Pittsburgh, PA
December 4, 2024*; 6:00 pm, ACCNX		at Pittsburgh; City Game	W 73–69	5–2	20 – Kiaku	12 – M. McConnell	4 – Tied	Petersen Events Center (551); Pittsburgh, PA
December 8, 2024*; 2:00 pm, ESPN+		Carnegie Mellon	W 98–58	6–2	19 – M. McConnell	7 – M. McConnell	5 – M. McConnell	UPMC Cooper Fieldhouse (702); Pittsburgh, PA
December 10, 2024*; 6:00 pm, ESPN+		Bucknell	W 65–48	7–2	16 – Hutcherson	6 – Tied	4 – M. McConnell	UPMC Cooper Fieldhouse (662); Pittsburgh, PA
December 15, 2024*; 2:00 pm, ESPN+		Canisius	W 90–66	8–2	35 – M. McConnell	4 – Tied	6 – M. McConnell	UPMC Cooper Fieldhouse (762); Pittsburgh, PA
December 21, 2024*; 12:00 pm, SNP/ESPN+		Bowling Green	W 67–59	9–2	20 – Matic	10 – M. McConnell	10 – M. McConnell	UPMC Cooper Fieldhouse (805); Pittsburgh, PA
A–10 regular season
December 29, 2024; 12:00 pm, ESPN+		Davidson	L 70–76	9–3 (0–1)	29 – M. McConnell	6 – M. McConnell	3 – M. McConnell	UPMC Cooper Fieldhouse (1,067); Pittsburgh, PA
January 2, 2025; 6:00 pm, ESPN+		at VCU	L 63–65	9–4 (0–2)	24 – M. McConnell	10 – Hutcherson	5 – M. McConnell	Siegel Center (546); Richmond, VA
January 5, 2025; 2:00 pm, ESPN+		Fordham	L 62−64	9−5 (0−3)	26 – M. McConnell	8 – M. McConnell	3 – R. Green	UPMC Cooper Fieldhouse (886); Pittsburgh, PA
January 8, 2025; 7:00 pm, ESPN+		at Saint Joseph's	W 67−64	10−5 (1−3)	19 – M. McConnell	9 – Browne	5 – M. McConnell	Hagan Arena (703); Philadelphia, PA
January 11, 2025; 12:00 pm, ESPN+		at George Washington	W 97−55	11−5 (2−3)	20 – Blackford	6 – Tied	6 – M. McConnell	Charles E. Smith Center (505); Washington, D.C.
January 15, 2025; 6:00 pm, SNP/ESPN+		Dayton	L 71−80	11−6 (2−4)	18 – Kiaku	9 – Moore	6 – M. McConnell	UPMC Cooper Fieldhouse (975); Pittsburgh, PA
January 19, 2025; 12:00 pm, CBSSN		Rhode Island	W 77−64	12−6 (3−4)	19 – M. McConnell	9 – M. McConnell	5 – M. McConnell	UPMC Cooper Fieldhouse (903); Pittsburgh, PA
January 22, 2025; 11:00 am, ESPN+		at La Salle	W 67−57	13−6 (4−4)	20 – M. McConnell	8 – Hutcherson	4 – M. McConnell	John Glaser Arena (185); Philadelphia, PA
January 30, 2025; 8:00 pm, Peacock		VCU	W 69−59	14−6 (5−4)	15 – Blackford	7 – Tied	6 – Kiaku	UPMC Cooper Fieldhouse (878); Pittsburgh, PA
February 2, 2025; 1:00 pm, ESPN+		at St. Bonaventure	W 80−46	15−6 (6−4)	17 – M. McConnell	9 – M. McConnell	4 – Walker	Reilly Center (346); St. Bonaventure, NY
February 5, 2025; 6:35 pm, ESPN+		at Rhode Island	L 57−59	15−7 (6−5)	22 – M. McConnell	7 – Tied	3 – Kiaku	Ryan Center (1,046); Kingston, RI
February 9, 2025; 2:00 pm, CBSSN		Richmond	L 58−82	15−8 (6−6)	16 – M. McConnell	8 – M. McConnell	7 – M. McConnell	UPMC Cooper Fieldhouse (1,416); Pittsburgh, PA
February 12, 2025; 6:00 pm, SNP/ESPN+		UMass	L 52−72	15−9 (6−7)	15 – Tied	6 – Matic	5 – M. McConnell	UPMC Cooper Fieldhouse (1,167); Pittsburgh, PA
February 15, 2025; 3:00 pm, ESPN+		at Loyola Chicago	W 75−70	16−9 (7−7)	15 – M. McConnell	8 – M. McConnell	5 – M. McConnell	Joseph J. Gentile Arena (1,663); Chicago, IL
February 19, 2025; 7:00 pm, ESPN+		at Fordham	L 53−56	16−10 (7−8)	17 – M. McConnell	12 – M. McConnell	4 – M. McConnell	Rose Hill Gymnasium (316); Bronx, NY
February 22, 2025; 2:00 pm, SNY/ESPN+		Saint Louis	W 84−72	17−10 (8−8)	22 – M. McConnell	10 – Hutcherson	11 – M. McConnell	UPMC Cooper Fieldhouse (1,268); Pittsburgh, PA
February 26, 2025; 11:00 am, SNY/ESPN+		St. Bonaventure	W 74−48	18−10 (9−8)	25 – M. McConnell	9 – M. McConnell	6 – M. McConnell	UPMC Cooper Fieldhouse (3,115); Pittsburgh, PA
March 1, 2025; 3:00 pm, ESPN+		at George Mason	L 63−86	18−11 (9−9)	22 – M. McConnell	7 – Hutcherson	2 – Tied	EagleBank Arena (2,456); Fairfax, VA
A–10 tournament
March 6, 2025; 11:00 am, ESPN+	(9)	vs. (8) Fordham; Second round	W 79–63	19–11	21 – Kiaku	6 – Tied	7 – M. McConnell	Henrico Sports & Events Center; Henrico, VA
March 7, 2025; 11:00 am, Peacock	(9)	vs. (1) Richmond; Quarterfinals	L 58–63	19–12	18 – Brown	7 – Browne	3 – McConnell	Henrico Sports & Events Center; Henrico, VA
WNIT
March 20, 2025*; 6:00 p.m., ESPN+		Longwood; First round	W 70–68	20–12	25 – McConnell	12 – Kiaku	5 – Kiaku	UPMC Cooper Fieldhouse (1,119); Pittsburgh, PA
March 23, 2025*; 1:00 p.m., ESPN+		at Miami (OH); Second round	W 73–66	21–12	24 – McConnell	9 – McConnell	6 – McConnell	Millett Hall (429); Oxford, OH
March 28, 2025*; 7:00 p.m., ESPN+		at Cleveland State; Super 16	L 52–55	21–13	15 – Kiaku	9 – Tied	4 – Walker	Wolstein Center (367); Cleveland, OH
*Non-conference game. ^{#}Rankings from AP Poll. (#) Tournament seedings in parentheses. All times are in Eastern.
