= Megan McConnell =

American basketball player (born 2001)

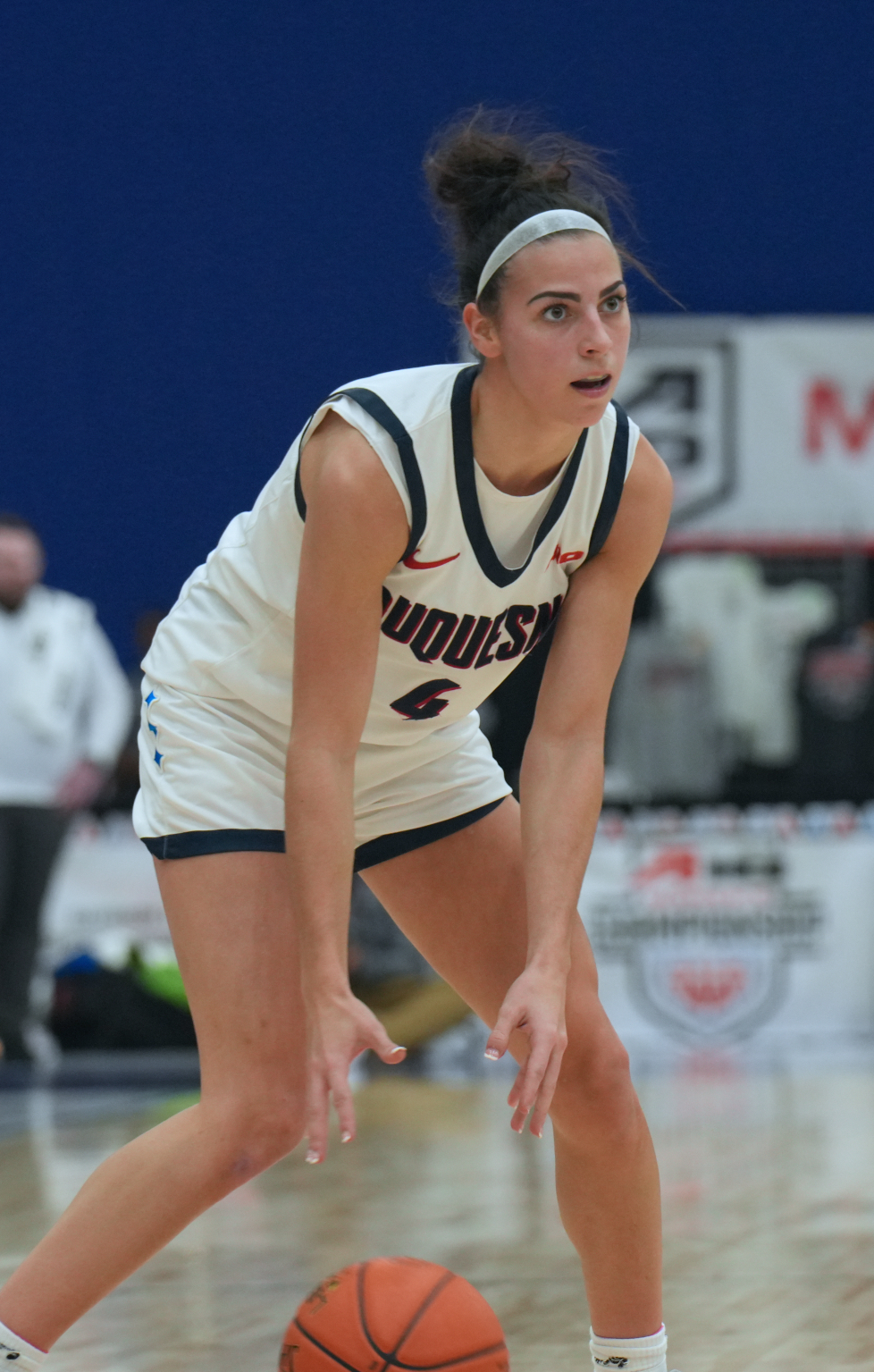
- McConnell playing for the Duquesne Dukes in 2024

Savannah Steel
- Position: Guard
- League: UpShot League

Personal information
- Born: November 12, 2001 (age 25) Pittsburgh, Pennsylvania, U.S.
- Listed height: 5 ft 7 in (1.70 m)

Career information
- High school: Chartiers Valley (Bridgeville, Pennsylvania)
- College: Duquesne (2020–2025)
- WNBA draft: 2025: undrafted
- Playing career: 2025–present

Career history
- 2025: Phoenix Mercury
- 2025–present: Bendigo Spirit
- 2026: Indiana Fever

Career highlights
- Atlantic 10 Defensive Player of the Year (2025); 2× First-team All-Atlantic 10 (2024, 2025); 2× Atlantic 10 All-Defensive Team (2024, 2025); Second-team All-Atlantic 10 (2023)
- Stats at WNBA.com
- Stats at Basketball Reference

Megan McConnell (born November 12, 2001) is an American professional basketball player for the Savannah Steel of the UpShot League. She played college basketball for the Duquesne Dukes. McConnell was signed by the Phoenix Mercury of the Women's National Basketball Association (WNBA) as an undrafted free agent in 2025.

== Early life ==
McConnell was born in Pittsburgh, Pennsylvania and attended Chartiers Valley High School in Bridgeville. Playing on the school's basketball team, she was a second-team all-state selection as a freshman and sophomore, and a first-team all-state selection as a junior and senior. She led her team to a state championship in her junior year. Despite her high school basketball success, she was not heavily recruited by major college programs due to her relatively small size.

== College career ==
McConnell played college basketball for the Duquesne Dukes. In the 2020–2021 season, her first with the team, she led Duquesne in minutes (28.7), assists (2.8), and steals (1.4) per game. The following season, she led the A-10 in steals per game (2.6) while leading her team in rebounds per game, with 6.4, and adding three double-doubles.

McConnell started in every game of the 2022–2023 season, recording 12 double-doubles and two triple-doubles, one of only two NCAA Division I players with multiple triple-doubles. Her 303 rebounds set a new single-season school record. She averaged 11.2 points, 9.8 rebounds, and 2.3 steals per game; additionally, her 5.5 assists per game led the conference. She was named second-team All-A-10 at the end of the season.

Again starting in every game of the 2023–2024 season, McConnell's 38.6 minutes per game were the highest among Division I players. Her 13.1 points, 8.6 rebounds, 4.6 assists, and 1.9 steals per game all led her team, and her 294 total rebounds were the most in the A-10. She recorded ten double-doubles and was named first-team All-A-10.

McConnell was the only player to start every game for Duquesne in the 2024–2025 season. She averaged 18.4 points, 5.0 assists, and 4.1 steals per game, all of which were the highest in the conference. She added seven double-doubles and two triple-doubles, one of three Division I players with multiple triple-doubles, and was named first-team All-A-10 for a second time. She was also named the A-10's defensive player of the year.

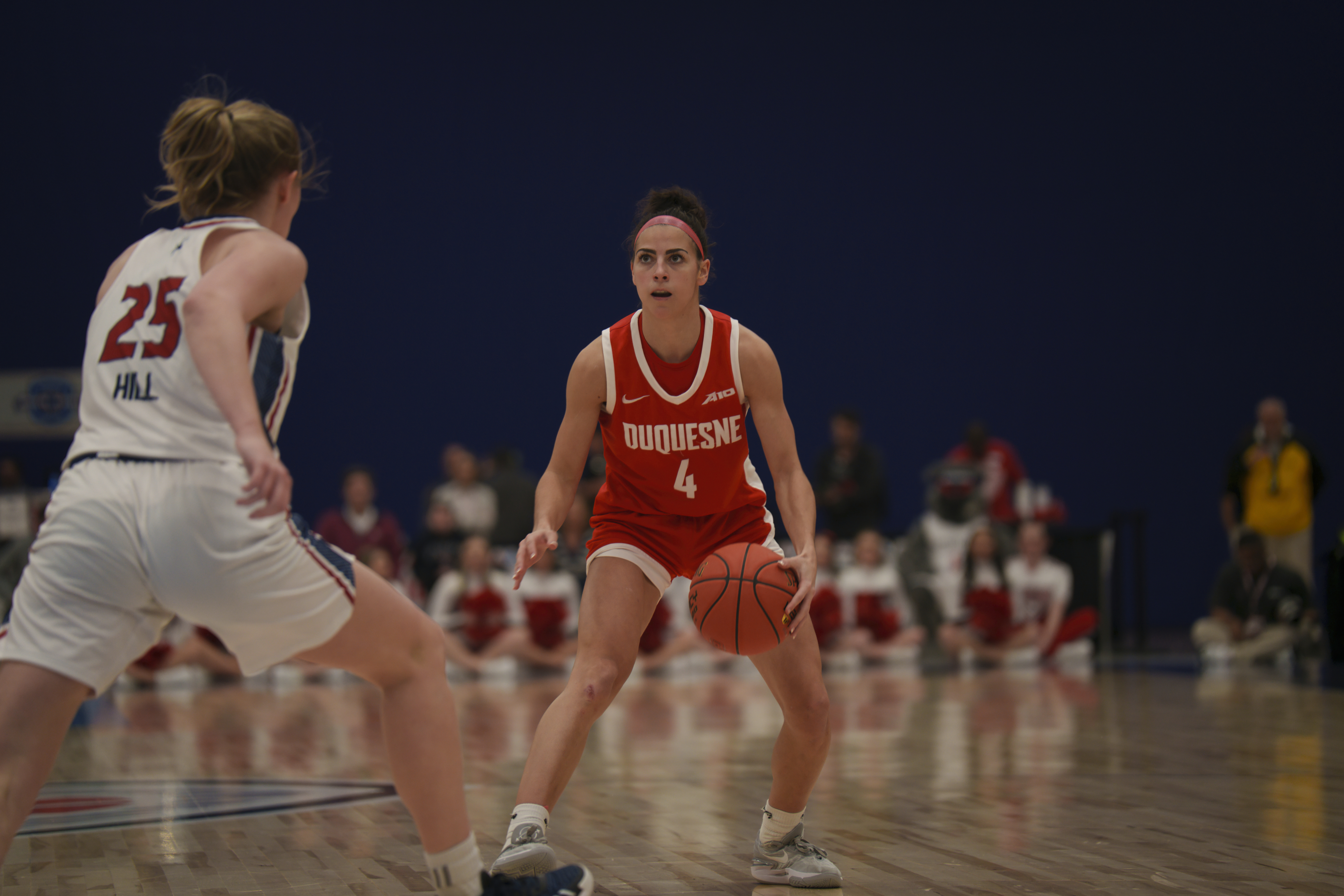
McConnell playing for the Duquesne Dukes in the 2024 Atlantic 10 women's basketball tournament

McConnell holds Duquesne program records in all-time steals (370), assists (660), games played (144), games started (136), and triple-doubles (4). Her 1,795 points and 1,079 rebounds each rank second in program history. In 2025, Duquesne head coach Dan Burt called McConnell "the best player [he has] ever coached".

== Professional career ==
=== WNBA ===
On April 14, 2025, McConnell received a training camp invitation from the Phoenix Mercury of the Women's National Basketball Association (WNBA). She was waived at the end of training camp, but the Mercury signed her to a contract in June. In her WNBA debut, McConnell recorded three points, three assists, one rebound, and one steal in 13 minutes before leaving the game with a knee injury; the injury was later specified as a tibial plateau fracture. She was waived by the Mercury on June 26.

On April 13, 2026, McConnell signed a training camp contract with the Indiana Fever. She was waived on May 6.

=== Overseas ===
In August 2025, McConnell signed with the Bendigo Spirit of the Women's National Basketball League (WNBL) for the 2025–26 season. She averaged 11.2 points, 6.2 rebounds, and 3.9 assists per game that season.

=== Return to America ===
On May 11, 2026, it was announced McConnell had joined the Savannah Steel for the team's inaugural season.

== Career statistics ==
Legend
GP	Games played	GS	Games started	MPG	Minutes per game	FG%	Field goal percentage
3P%	3-point field goal percentage	FT%	Free throw percentage	RPG	Rebounds per game	APG	Assists per game
SPG	Steals per game	BPG	Blocks per game	TO	Turnovers per game	PPG	Points per game
**Bold**	Career high	*	Led Division I	°	Led the league	‡	WNBA record

=== WNBA ===
WNBA regular season statistics
Year	Team	GP	GS	MPG	FG%	3P%	FT%	RPG	APG	SPG	BPG	TO	PPG
2025	Phoenix	1	0	13.0	.250	.500	—	1.0	3.0	1.0	.0	.0	3.0
**Career**	1 year, 1 team	1	0	13.0	.250	.500	—	1.0	3.0	1.0	.0	.0	3.0

=== College ===
NCAA statistics
Year	Team	GP	GS	MPG	FG%	3P%	FT%	RPG	APG	SPG	BPG	TO	PPG
2020–21	Duquesne	16	9	28.7	.359	.322	**.794**	3.2	2.8	1.4	.4	**1.3**	7.5
2021–22	Duquesne	29	28	36.0	.359	.239	.581	6.4	4.1	2.6	.3	2.0	8.8
2022–23	Duquesne	31	31	36.6	**.496**	**.400**	.557	**9.8**	**5.5**	2.3	**.6**	2.2	11.2
2023–24	Duquesne	**34**	**34**	**38.5***	.456	**.400**	.655	8.6	4.6	1.9	.2	2.1	13.1
2024–25	Duquesne	**34**	**34**	36.8*	.469	.330	.625	7.2	5.0	**4.1**	.3	2.6	**18.4**
**Career**		144	136	36.1	.444	.339	.623	7.5	4.6	2.6	.3	2.1	12.5

== Personal life ==
McConnell's brother, T. J. McConnell, plays professional basketball for the Indiana Pacers of the National Basketball Association (NBA). Another brother, Matty McConnell, played college basketball for the Robert Morris Colonials. Her father Tim McConnell coached both boys' and girls' basketball at Chartiers Valley High School, including the school's state championship season during McConnell's junior year. Her aunt, Suzie McConnell-Serio, is a former basketball player and coach; she is an Olympic gold medalist, coached the Minnesota Lynx of the WNBA, and was inducted into the Women's Basketball Hall of Fame. Another aunt, Kathy McConnell-Miller, played college basketball for the Virginia Cavaliers and also coached the Tulsa Golden Hurricane and Colorado Buffaloes college teams. Her uncle, Tom McConnell, has coached both men's and women's college basketball.

After McConnell signed with the Mercury, T. J. wore his sister's Mercury jersey to the Pacers' NBA Finals Game 1. On the same night, McConnell wore her brother's Pacers jersey to her game with the Mercury.
