= Monmouth Hawks basketball =

Monmouth Hawks basketball may refer to either of the basketball teams that represent Monmouth University:

- Monmouth Hawks men's basketball
- Monmouth Hawks women's basketball
