= 2013–14 Fordham Rams women's basketball team =

Intercollegiate basketball season

2013–14 Fordham Rams women's basketball

2013 Lady Rebel Round-Up Champions 2013 Fordham Holiday Classic Champions 2014 A10 Tournament Champions

NCAA Women's Tournament, first round
- Conference: Atlantic 10
- Record: 25–8 (11–5 A-10)
- Head coach: Stephanie Gaitley (3rd season)
- Assistant coaches: Angelika Szumilo; Dale Hodges; Laura Forbes
- Home arena: Rose Hill Gymnasium

2013–14 Atlantic 10 women's basketball standings
	Conf.				Overall
Team	W		L	PCT	W		L	PCT
Dayton	14	–	2	.875	23	–	8	.742
St. Bonaventure	11	–	5	.688	24	–	11	.686
Fordham†	11	–	5	.688	25	–	8	.758
George Washington	11	–	5	.688	23	–	11	.676
Saint Joseph's	10	–	6	.625	23	–	10	.697
Duquesne	10	–	6	.625	20	–	13	.606
La Salle	9	–	7	.563	15	–	15	.500
VCU	9	–	7	.563	22	–	10	.688
Richmond	8	–	8	.500	14	–	16	.467
Saint Louis	7	–	9	.438	12	–	18	.400
Rhode Island	2	–	14	.125	7	–	23	.233
George Mason	1	–	15	.063	8	–	23	.258
UMass	1	–	15	.063	4	–	27	.129
† 2014 A10 Tournament winner As of 10:03, 1 April 2014 (UTC); Rankings from AP poll

The 2013–14 Fordham Rams women's basketball team represented Fordham University during the 2013–14 NCAA Division I women's basketball season. The team was coached by Stephanie Gaitley in her third year at the school. Fordham Rams home games were played at Rose Hill Gymnasium and the team was a member of the Atlantic 10 Conference. The Rams finished with an 11-5 record in conference play and were the 3-seed going into the A-10 Tournament. The Rams emerged as conference tournament champions to earn the automatic bid to the NCAA tournament.

== Roster ==
2013–14 Fordham Rams women's basketball team
Players
Coaches

Pos.	#	Name	Height	Year	Previous school	Hometown
G	1	Erin Rooney	5 ft 8 in (1.73 m)	RS Sr	Marian	Christchurch, New Zealand
G	3	Alina Gjerkes	5 ft 11 in (1.8 m)	Fr	Gimnazija Bezigrad	Grosuplje, Slovenia
G	4	Taryn Durant	5 ft 7 in (1.7 m)	Jr	McDonough	Owings Mills, MD
G	10	Briana Jordan	5 ft 6 in (1.68 m)	RS Jr	Norcross	Norcross, GA
F	11	Emily Tapino	6 ft 0 in (1.83 m)	Jr	Brewster	Brewster, NY
F	12	Mary Nwachukwu	6 ft 2 in (1.88 m)	RS Sr	Dighton-Rehoboth	Dighton, MA
F	14	Danielle Padovano	6 ft 0 in (1.83 m)	Fr	South Brunswick	Dayton, NJ
G/F	22	Danielle Burns	5 ft 10 in (1.78 m)	Fr	Stonewall Jackson	Gainesville, VA
G	23	Khadijah Gibson	5 ft 8 in (1.73 m)	So	Henry Wise	Upper Marlboro, MD
F	24	Samantha Clark	6 ft 2 in (1.88 m)	So	St. Rose	Neptune, NJ
G	25	Hannah Missry	5 ft 8 in (1.73 m)	Fr	Jackson Memorial	Jackson, NJ
F	31	Liz Milner	6 ft 1 in (1.85 m)	Jr	Haldane	Cold Spring, NY
F	32	Christina Gaskin	6 ft 1 in (1.85 m)	Jr	Barkey Abbey Academy	Hockley, England
G	42	Abigail Corning	5 ft 10 in (1.78 m)	Sr	Wethersfield	Wethersfield, CT

Head coach

- Stephanie Gaitley (Villanova)

Assistant coach(es)

- Angelika Szumilo (LIU Brooklyn)
- Dale Hodges (Saint Joseph's)
- Laura Forbes (Monmouth)

Legend

- (C) Team captain
- (S) Suspended
- (I) Ineligible
- (W) Walk-on
- Injured
- Current redshirt

== Schedule and results ==
Date time, TV	Rank^{#}	Opponent^{#}	Result	Record	Site (attendance) city, state
Exhibition
11/03/2013*; 2:00 pm		Kutztown	W 86–49	-	Rose Hill Gymnasium (N/A); Bronx, NY
Regular Season
11/08/2013*; 6:00 pm, SNY		San Francisco	W 80–66	1–0	Rose Hill Gymnasium (N/A); Bronx, NY
11/10/2013*; 2:00 pm		at Penn State	L 61–78	1–1	Bryce Jordan Center (3,834); University Park, PA
11/15/2013*; 7:00 pm		at Hofstra	L 64–77	1–2	Hofstra Arena (309); Hempstead, NY
11/17/2013*; 2:00 pm		Pacific	W 84–63	2–2	Rose Hill Gymnasium (325); Bronx, NY
11/22/2013*; 7:00 pm		Yale	W 80–52	3–2	Rose Hill Gymnasium (334); Bronx, NY
11/25/2013*; 7:00 pm		American	W 66–62	4–2	Rose Hill Gymnasium (318); Bronx, NY
11/30/2013*; 4:00 pm, MWN		at UNLV; Lady Rebel Round-Up	W 72–63	5–2	Cox Pavilion (571); Paradise, NV
12/01/2013*; 4:00 pm, MWN		vs. Cincinnati; Lady Rebel Round-Up	W 56–40	6–2	Cox Pavilion (535); Paradise, NV
12/07/2013*; 1:00 pm		at Holy Cross	W 75–49	7–2	Hart Center (491); Worcester, MA
12/15/2013*; 2:00 pm		Illinois State	W 66–62	8–2	Rose Hill Gymnasium (312); Bronx, NY
12/21/2013*; 7:00 pm		at Manhattan; Battle of the Bronx	W 71–46	9–2	Draddy Gymnasium (216); New York City
12/29/2013*; 1:00 pm		UNC Greensboro; Fordham Classic	W 79–48	10–2	Rose Hill Gymnasium (N/A); Bronx, NY
12/30/2013*; 3:00 pm		Harvard; Fordham Classic	W 64–44	11–2	Rose Hill Gymnasium (410); Bronx, NY
01/02/2014; 7:00 pm, CBSSN		Saint Louis	W 74–52	12–2 (1–0)	Rose Hill Gymnasium (357); Bronx, NY
01/05/2014; 2:00 pm		at UMass	W 75–61	13–2 (2–0)	Mullins Center (317); Amherst, MA
01/08/2014; 7:00 pm		Duquesne	L 61–65	13–3 (2–1)	Rose Hill Gymnasium (386); Bronx, NY
01/11/2014; 2:00 pm		Richmond	W 70–59	14–3 (3–1)	Rose Hill Gymnasium (439); Bronx, NY
01/15/2014; 7:00 pm		at VCU	W 76–73	15–3 (4–1)	Stuart C. Siegel Center (603); Richmond, VA
01/19/2014; 3:30 pm, ESPNU		Dayton	L 64–73	15–4 (4–2)	University of Dayton Arena (1,936); Dayton, OH
01/25/2014; 2:00 pm		UMass	W 80–54	16–4 (5–2)	Rose Hill Gymnasium (352); Bronx, NY
01/29/2014; 12:00 pm		Rhode Island	W 64–51	17–4 (6–2)	Rose Hill Gymnasium (2,686); Bronx, NY
02/01/2014; 1:00 pm		at St. Bonaventure	L 67–74	17–5 (6–3)	Reilly Center (464); Olean, NY
02/05/2014; 8:00 pm		at Saint Louis	W 56–45	18–5 (7–3)	Chaifetz Arena (332); St. Louis, MO
02/08/2014; 2:00 pm		George Washington	W 67–58	19–5 (8–3)	Rose Hill Gymnasium (576); Bronx, NY
02/11/2014; 7:00 pm, CBSSN		at Richmond	L 77–78 ^{2OT}	19–6 (8–4)	Robins Center (412); Richmond, VA
02/15/2014; 2:00 pm		La Salle	W 43–42	20–6 (9–4)	Rose Hill Gymnasium (693); Bronx, NY
02/22/2014; 7:00 pm		at Duquesne	L 51–60	20–7 (9–5)	A.J. Palumbo Center (1,073); Pittsburgh, PA
02/26/2014; 7:00 pm		George Mason; Senior Day	W 71–52	21–7 (10–5)	Rose Hill Gymnasium (637); Bronx, NY
03/02/2014; 2:00 pm		at Saint Joseph's	W 58–53	22–7 (11–5)	Hagan Arena (2,861); Philadelphia, PA
2014 A10 Tournament
03/07/2014; 7:30 pm		vs. Duquesne; Quarterfinals	W 45–41	23–7	Richmond Coliseum (2,850); Richmond, VA
03/08/2014; 1:30 pm, CBSSN		vs. St. Bonaventure; Semifinals	W 73–32	24–7	Richmond Coliseum (1,843); Richmond, VA
03/09/2014; 11:00 am, ESPNU		vs. Dayton; Championship Game	W 45–41	25–7	Richmond Coliseum (1,415); Richmond, VA
2014 NCAA Tournament
03/22/2014; 4:00 pm, ESPN2		vs. No. 24 Cal; First Round	L 63–64	25–8	Ferrell Center (6,207); Waco, TX
*Non-conference game. ^{#}Rankings from AP Poll. (#) Tournament seedings in parentheses. All times are in Eastern Time.
