= 2014 Atlantic 10 women's basketball tournament =

- Classification: Division I
- Season: 2013–14
- Teams: 13
- Site: Richmond Coliseum; Richmond, VA
- Champions: Fordham (1st title)
- Winning coach: Stephanie Gaitley (1st title)
- MVP: Abigail Corning (Fordham)
- Television: A10 Digital, CBSSN, ESPNU

2013–14 Atlantic 10 women's basketball standings
	Conf.				Overall
Team	W		L	PCT	W		L	PCT
Dayton	14	–	2	.875	23	–	8	.742
St. Bonaventure	11	–	5	.688	24	–	11	.686
Fordham†	11	–	5	.688	25	–	8	.758
George Washington	11	–	5	.688	23	–	11	.676
Saint Joseph's	10	–	6	.625	23	–	10	.697
Duquesne	10	–	6	.625	20	–	13	.606
La Salle	9	–	7	.563	15	–	15	.500
VCU	9	–	7	.563	22	–	10	.688
Richmond	8	–	8	.500	14	–	16	.467
Saint Louis	7	–	9	.438	12	–	18	.400
Rhode Island	2	–	14	.125	7	–	23	.233
George Mason	1	–	15	.063	8	–	23	.258
UMass	1	–	15	.063	4	–	27	.129
† 2014 A10 Tournament winner As of 10:03, 1 April 2014 (UTC); Rankings from AP poll

The 2014 Atlantic 10 women's basketball tournament will be played March 5–9 at the Richmond Coliseum in Richmond, Virginia. This will be a 13 team Tournament with the addition of George Mason. The top 11 seeds will get the first round bye and the top 4 seeds will get the double bye. The 2014 championship game will be nationally televised on ESPNU. Fordham defeated Dayton 63–51 to win their first A-10 Tournament in school history. With that win, the Rams received the Atlantic 10 Conference's automatic bid to the NCAA Women's Tournament.

== Seeds ==
Teams are seeded by record within the conference, with a tiebreaker system to seed teams with identical conference records.

Seed	School	Conf (Overall)	Tiebreaker
#1	Dayton	14-2	
#2	St. Bonaventure	11-5	2-0 vs. FORDHAM, GW
#3	Fordham	11-5	1-1 vs. GW, STBONA
#4	George Washington	11-5	0-2 vs. FORDHAM, STBONA
#5	Saint Joseph's	10-6	1-0 vs. DUQ
#6	Duquesne	10-6	0-1 vs. STJOES
#7	La Salle	9-7	1-0 vs. VCU
#8	VCU	9-7	0-1 vs. LASALLE
#9	Richmond	8-8	
#10	Saint Louis	6-9	
#11	Rhode Island	2-14	
#12	George Mason	1-15	1-0 vs. UMASS
#13	Massachusetts	1-15	0-1 vs. GM

== Schedule ==
Session	Game	Time*	Matchup^{#}	Television	Score
First round - Wednesday, March 5
1	1	7:00pm	George Mason vs. Massachusetts		85–75 ^{OT}
Second round - Thursday, March 6
2	2	12:00pm	VCU vs. Richmond		61–52
2	3	2:30pm	Saint Joseph's vs. George Mason		89–55
3	4	5:00pm	La Salle vs. St. Louis		65–56
3	5	7:30pm	Duquesne vs. Rhode Island		61–53
Quarterfinals - Friday, March 7
4	6	12:00pm	Dayton vs. VCU		62–61
4	7	2:30pm	George Washington vs. St. Joseph's		82–79
5	8	5:00pm	St. Bonaventure vs. La Salle		54–42
5	9	7:30pm	Fordham vs. Duquesne		45–41
Semifinals - Saturday, March 8
6	10	11:00am	Dayton vs. George Washington	CBSSN	89–68
6	11	1:30pm	St. Bonaventure vs. Fordham	CBSSN	32–73
Championship Game - Sunday, March 9
7	12	11:00am	Dayton vs. Fordham	ESPNU	51-63

*Game times in Eastern Time. #Rankings denote tournament seeding.

== Bracket ==
First round Wednesday, March 5, 2014
12	George Mason	85
13	Massachusetts	75^{OT}

Second round Thursday, March 6, 2014
1	Dayton
(bye)
8	VCU	61
9	Richmond	52
5	St. Joseph's	89
12	George Mason	55
4	George Washington
(bye)
2	St. Bonaventure
(bye)
7	La Salle	65
10	St. Louis	56
6	Duquesne	61
11	Rhode Island	53
3	Fordham
(bye)

Quarterfinals; Friday, March 7, 2014
1	Dayton	62
8	VCU	61
5	St. Joseph's	79
4	George Washington	82
2	St. Bonaventure	54
7	La Salle	42
6	Duquesne	41
3	Fordham	45

Semi-finals; Saturday, March 8, 2014; CBS Sports Network
1	Dayton	89
4	George Washington	68
2	St. Bonaventure	32
3	Fordham	73

Championship; Sunday, March 9, 2014; ESPNU
1	Dayton	51
3	Fordham	63

All times listed are Eastern

== See also ==
2014 Atlantic 10 men's basketball tournament
