= 2022–23 Monmouth Hawks women's basketball team =

American college basketball season

2022–23 Monmouth Hawks women's basketball
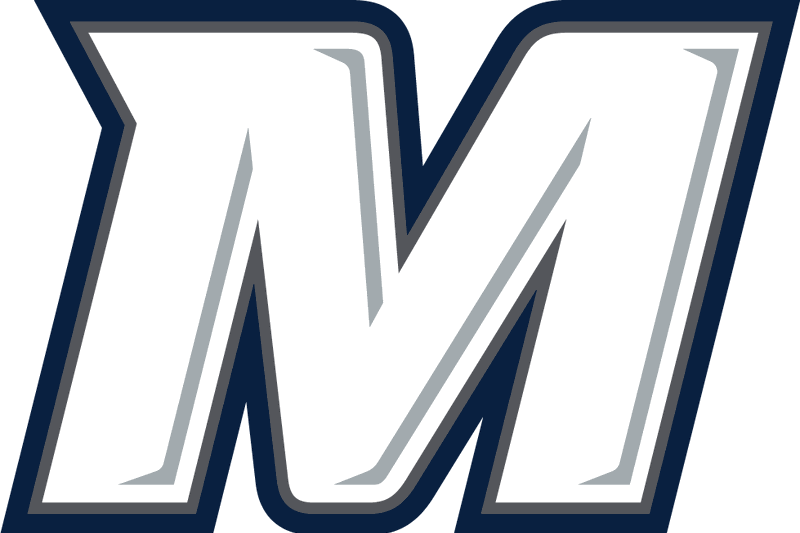

CAA tournament champions

NCAA tournament, First Four
- Conference: Colonial Athletic Association
- Record: 18–16 (9–9 CAA)
- Head coach: Ginny Boggess (2nd season)
- Assistant coaches: Anjalé Barrett; Sean Bair; Camden Boehner
- Home arena: OceanFirst Bank Center

2022–23 CAA women's basketball standings
	Conf.				Overall
Team	W		L	PCT	W		L	PCT
Towson	13	–	5	.722	21	–	11	.656
Drexel	13	–	5	.722	21	–	10	.677
Northeastern	13	–	5	.722	19	–	12	.613
William & Mary	12	–	6	.667	18	–	13	.581
North Carolina A&T	12	–	6	.667	18	–	12	.600
Stony Brook	11	–	7	.611	18	–	13	.581
Monmouth †	9	–	9	.500	18	–	16	.529
Delaware	9	–	9	.500	16	–	14	.533
Hampton	8	–	10	.444	12	–	18	.400
Charleston	6	–	12	.333	11	–	18	.379
Elon	5	–	13	.278	9	–	21	.300
Hofstra	4	–	14	.222	12	–	20	.375
UNC Wilmington	2	–	16	.111	5	–	25	.167
† 2023 CAA tournament winner As of March 17, 2023; Rankings from AP poll

The 2022–23 Monmouth Hawks women's basketball team represented Monmouth University in the 2022–23 NCAA Division I women's basketball season. The Hawks, led by second-year head coach Ginny Boggess, played their home games at OceanFirst Bank Center in West Long Branch, New Jersey as first-year members of the Colonial Athletic Association (CAA).

The Hawks finished the season 18–16, 9–9 in CAA play, to finish in a tie for seventh place. As the #7 seed in the CAA tournament, they defeated #10 seed College of Charleston in the second round, upset #2 seed Drexel, #3 seed Northeastern and top-seeded Towson to become the lowest-seeded team to ever win the CAA tournament, doing it in their first season in the CAA, sending the Hawks to just their second NCAA tournament appearance, and their first since 1983. They earned the CAA's automatic bid into the NCAA tournament, receiving the #16 seed in the Greenville Regional 2. They were defeated by Tennessee Tech in the First Four.

== Roster ==
2022–23 Monmouth Hawks women's basketball team
Players
Coaches

Pos.	#	Name	Height	Year	Previous school	Hometown
G	1	Ariana Vanderhoop	5 ft 9 in (1.75 m)	Jr	Cathedral High School	Boston, MA
G	4	Kaci Donovan	6 ft 1 in (1.85 m)	Jr	Owego Free Academy; Penn State	Owego, NY
G	5	Antonia Panayides	5 ft 7 in (1.7 m)	So	Red Bank Catholic	Tinton Falls, NJ
G	10	Brianna Tinsley	5 ft 7 in (1.7 m)	GS	St. Anne's-Belfield; Virginia/James Madison	Aroda, VA
F	11	Lovin Tinsley	6 ft 1 in (1.85 m)	GS	St. Rose; Saint Joseph's	Manasquan, NJ
G	15	Amiya Carroll	5 ft 11 in (1.8 m)	Fr	Sanford School	Smyrna, DE
G	20	Jania Hall	5 ft 8 in (1.73 m)	Jr	St. Vincent Pallotti	Gaithersburg, MD
G	22	Jen Louro	5 ft 8 in (1.73 m)	GS	St. Rose; UMass Lowell	Wall, NJ
F	23	Ella Farrelly	6 ft 1 in (1.85 m)	Fr	King's Christian Collegiate	Ontario, Canada
C	24	Belle Kranbuhl	6 ft 3 in (1.91 m)	Jr	Adirondack Central	Boonville, NY
F	25	Lucy Thomas	6 ft 0 in (1.83 m)	GS	St. Rose	Ocean, NJ
F	32	Kayla Richardson	5 ft 11 in (1.8 m)	Jr	Middletown South; La Salle	Red Bank, NJ

Head coach

- Ginny Boggess (Wingate)

Assistant coach(es)

- Anjalé Barrett (Maryland)
- Sean Bair (Dickinson College)
- Camden Boehner (West Chester)

Legend

- (C) Team captain
- (S) Suspended
- (I) Ineligible
- (W) Walk-on
- Injured
- Current redshirt

Roster
Last update: March 2, 2025

== Schedule and results ==
Date time, TV	Rank^{#}	Opponent^{#}	Result	Record	Site (attendance) city, state
Non-conference regular season
November 7, 2022*; 1:00 p.m., FloSports		at St. John's	L 39–78	0–1	Carnesecca Arena (329); Queens, NY
November 10, 2022*; 7:00 p.m., FloSports		New Jersey City	W 79–70	1–1	OceanFirst Bank Center (505); West Long Branch, NJ
November 13, 2022*; 4:00 p.m.		at Sacred Heart	W 77–62	2–1	William H. Pitt Center (497); Fairfield, CT
November 16, 2022*; 7:00 p.m., ESPN+		at Loyola (MD)	L 59–61	2–2	Reitz Arena (240); Baltimore, MD
November 22, 2022*; 7:00 p.m., ESPN+		at Navy	W 76–56	3–2	Alumni Hall (322); Annapolis, MD
November 25, 2022*; 2:00 p.m., ESPN+		at Brown	L 69–70	3–3	Pizzitola Sports Center (168); Providence, RI
November 27, 2022*; 3:00 p.m., FloSports		NJIT	W 70–62 ^{OT}	4–3	OceanFirst Bank Center (427); West Long Branch, NJ
December 1, 2022*; 7:00 p.m., FloSports/SNY		St. Francis Brooklyn	W 57–44	5–3	OceanFirst Bank Center (394); West Long Branch, NJ
December 7, 2022*; 6:30 p.m., ESPN+		at La Salle	L 60–66	5–4	Tom Gola Arena (117); Philadelphia, PA
December 10, 2022*; 2:00 p.m., FloSports/SNY		Dartmouth	L 56–71	5–5	OceanFirst Bank Center (563); West Long Branch, NJ
December 21, 2022*; 3:00 p.m., BYUtv		at BYU	L 50–70	5–6	Marriott Center (653); Provo, UT
CAA regular season
December 30, 2022; 3:00 p.m., FloSports		Northeastern	W 54–49	6–6 (1–0)	OceanFirst Bank Center (545); West Long Branch, NJ
January 1, 2023; 2:00 p.m., FloSports		at Delaware	W 80–60	7–6 (2–0)	Bob Carpenter Center (921); Newark, DE
January 6, 2023; 7:00 p.m., FloSports		North Carolina A&T	L 52–68	7–7 (2–1)	OceanFirst Bank Center (497); West Long Branch, NJ
January 8, 2023; 2:00 p.m., FloSports		Elon	W 64–56	8–7 (3–1)	OceanFirst Bank Center (435); West Long Branch, NJ
January 13, 2023; 6:30 p.m., FloSports/SNY		at Stony Brook	L 59–69	8–8 (3–2)	Island Federal Arena (609); Stony Brook, NY
January 15, 2023; 1:00 p.m., FloSports/SNY/NBCSPHI		Towson	L 57–63	8–9 (3–3)	OceanFirst Bank Center (489); West Long Branch, NJ
January 20, 2023; 7:00 p.m., FloSports		at College of Charleston	L 65–70	8–10 (3–4)	TD Arena (367); Charleston, SC
January 20, 2023; 2:00 p.m., FloSports		at UNC Wilmington	W 55–52	9–10 (4–4)	Trask Coliseum (735); Wilmington, NC
January 27, 2023; 7:00 p.m., FloSports		Hampton	W 69–56	10–10 (5–4)	OceanFirst Bank Center (581); West Long Branch, NJ
January 29, 2023; 1:30 p.m., FloSports/NESN		at Northeastern	L 70–75	10–11 (5–5)	Cabot Center (282); Boston, MA
February 3, 2023; 7:00 p.m., FloSports/SNY/NBCSPHI		Hofstra	W 63–59	11–11 (6–5)	OceanFirst Bank Center (1,039); West Long Branch, NJ
February 5, 2023; 1:00 p.m., FloSports		at William & Mary	L 68–73	11–12 (6–6)	Kaplan Arena (507); Williamsburg, VA
February 12, 2023; 3:00 p.m., FloSports/SNY/NBCSPHI		Drexel	W 70–66	12–12 (7–6)	OceanFirst Bank Center (470); West Long Branch, NJ
February 17, 2023; 7:00 p.m., FloSports		at Elon	L 48–57	12–13 (7–7)	Schar Center (767); Elon, NC
February 19, 2023; 2:00 p.m., FloSports		at North Carolina A&T	L 62–65	12–14 (7–8)	Corbett Sports Center (907); Greensboro, NC
February 26, 2023; 2:00 p.m., FloSports		at Hofstra	W 69–67	13–14 (8–8)	Mack Sports Complex (517); Hempstead, NY
March 2, 2023; 7:00 p.m., FloSports/SNY/NBCSPHI		William & Mary	L 60–70	13–15 (8–9)	OceanFirst Bank Center (583); West Long Branch, NJ
March 4, 2023; 4:00 p.m., FloSports/SNY		Stony Brook	W 72–71	14–15 (9–9)	OceanFirst Bank Center (920); West Long Branch, NJ
CAA women's tournament
March 9, 2023; 5:00 p.m., FloSports	(7)	vs. (10) College of Charleston; Second round	W 69–54	15–15	SECU Arena (200); Towson, MD
March 10, 2023; 6:00 p.m., FloSports	(7)	vs. (2) Drexel; Quarterfinals	W 65–59	16–15	SECU Arena (250); Towson, MD
March 11, 2023; 4:30 p.m., FloSports	(7)	vs. (3) Northeastern; Semifinals	W 73–60	17–15	SECU Arena (300); Towson, MD
March 12, 2023; 2:00 p.m., CBSSN	(7)	vs. (1) Towson; Championship game	W 80–55	18–15	SECU Arena (1,875); Towson, MD
NCAA women's tournament
March 16, 2023*; 7:00 p.m., ESPN2	(16 G2)	vs. (16 G2) Tennessee Tech; First Four	L 69–79	18–16	Simon Skjodt Assembly Hall (623); Bloomington, IN
*Non-conference game. ^{#}Rankings from AP poll. (#) Tournament seedings in parentheses. G2=Greenville 2. All times are in Eastern.

== See also ==
- 2022–23 Monmouth Hawks men's basketball team
