= 2023–24 Duquesne Dukes women's basketball team =

American college basketball season

2023–24 Duquesne Dukes women's basketball

WNIT, Super 16
- Conference: Atlantic 10 Conference
- Record: 21–13 (13–5 A-10)
- Head coach: Dan Burt (11th season)
- Assistant coaches: Vanessa Abel; Aurielle Anderson; Rick Bell; RJ Bell; Frank Ferraro
- Home arena: UPMC Cooper Fieldhouse

2023–24 Atlantic 10 women's basketball standings
	Conf.				Overall
Team	W		L	PCT	W		L	PCT
Richmond †	16	–	2	.889	29	–	6	.829
VCU	15	–	3	.833	26	–	6	.813
Saint Joseph's	15	–	3	.833	28	–	6	.824
George Mason	14	–	4	.778	23	–	8	.742
Duquesne	13	–	5	.722	21	–	13	.618
Rhode Island	10	–	8	.556	21	–	14	.600
Saint Louis	9	–	9	.500	22	–	18	.550
Davidson*	8	–	10	.444	18	–	8	.692
Loyola Chicago	8	–	10	.444	15	–	16	.484
Fordham	8	–	10	.444	12	–	17	.414
George Washington	6	–	12	.333	13	–	18	.419
Dayton	5	–	13	.278	12	–	19	.387
La Salle	5	–	13	.278	8	–	22	.267
UMass	2	–	16	.111	5	–	27	.156
St. Bonaventure	1	–	17	.056	4	–	26	.133
† 2024 A10 tournament winner * Season cancelled on March 1, 2024.

The 2023–24 Duquesne Dukes women's basketball team represented Duquesne University during the 2023–24 NCAA Division I women's basketball season. The Dukes, led by eleventh-year head coach Dan Burt, played their home games at the UPMC Cooper Fieldhouse in Pittsburgh, Pennsylvania as a member of the Atlantic 10 Conference (A-10).

== Previous season ==
The Dukes finished the 2022–23 season 19–12, 8–8 in A-10 play, to finish in a tie for ninth place. As the #10 seed in the A-10 tournament, they defeated #15 seed Loyola Chicago in the first round, before falling to #7 seed George Washington in the second round.

== Roster ==
2023–24 Duquesne Dukes women's basketball team
Players
Coaches

Pos.	#	Name	Height	Year	Previous school	Hometown
G	1	Jerni Kiaku	5 ft 9 in (1.75 m)	So	North Carolina Central	Garner, NC
F	2	Kaitlyn Ammons	6 ft 3 in (1.91 m)	RS So	DePaul	Morgantown, WV
G	4	Megan McConnell	5 ft 7 in (1.7 m)	Jr	Chartiers Valley HS	Pittsburgh, PA
G	10	Gabby Grantham-Medley	5 ft 9 in (1.75 m)	Fr	North Hagerstown HS	Hagerstown, MD
G	11	Nae Bernard	5 ft 5 in (1.65 m)	Jr	Salt Lake CC	Paris, France
G	12	Raymi Couëta	5 ft 8 in (1.73 m)	Fr	Cégep de Thetford	Cayenne, French Guiana
G	14	Lauren Wasylson	6 ft 0 in (1.83 m)	RS Sr	Xavier	Valencia, PA
G/F	20	Amaya Hamilton	6 ft 2 in (1.88 m)	Sr	Hamilton Southeastern HS	Fishers, IN
G/F	22	Kiandra Browne	6 ft 2 in (1.88 m)	Jr	Indiana	Montreal, QC
G	24	Tess Myers	5 ft 9 in (1.75 m)	Jr	North Catholic HS	Lower Burrell, PA
C	30	Selma Kulo	6 ft 4 in (1.93 m)	RS So	Western Kentucky	Sarajevo, Bosnia and Herzegovina
F	31	Precious Johnson	6 ft 4 in (1.93 m)	Sr	Marks Gymnasieskola	Helsingborg, Sweden
C	44	Ayanna Townsend	6 ft 2 in (1.88 m)	Sr	Xavier	Pittsburgh, PA

Head coach

- Dan Burt (West Liberty)

Assistant coach(es)

- Vanessa Abel (Duquesne)
- Aurielle Anderson (Western Michigan)
- Rick Bell (Pittsburgh)
- RJ Bell (Geneva)
- Frank Ferraro (Duquesne)

Legend

- (C) Team captain
- (S) Suspended
- (I) Ineligible
- (W) Walk-on
- Injured
- Current redshirt

Roster
Last update: December 18, 2023

== Schedule and results ==
Date time, TV	Rank^{#}	Opponent^{#}	Result	Record	High points	High rebounds	High assists	Site (attendance) city, state
Regular season
November 6, 2023*; 7:00 p.m., ESPN+		at Princeton	L 57–65	0–1	18 – Hamilton	12 – McConnell	4 – McConnell	Jadwin Gymnasium (750); Princeton, NJ
November 11, 2023*; 1:00 p.m., ESPN+		at Niagara	W 82–79	1–1	17 – Myers	10 – McConnell	5 – McConnell	Gallagher Center (459); Lewiston, NY
November 14, 2023*; 5:30 p.m.		at Howard	W 65–51	2–1	18 – Bernard	11 – Johnson	6 – McConnell	Burr Gymnasium (2,431); Washington, D.C.
November 18, 2023*; 2:00 p.m., SNPT/ESPN+		Pittsburgh; City Game	W 56–55	3–1	20 – McConnell	6 – Browne	4 – Hamilton	UPMC Cooper Fieldhouse (2,555); Pittsburgh, PA
November 27, 2023*; 7:00 p.m., ESPN+		at Bowling Green	L 66–68	3–2	28 – Hamilton	13 – McConnell	4 – McConnell	Stroh Center (1,717); Bowling Green, OH
December 3, 2023*; 2:00 p.m., SNPT/ESPN+		Delaware	L 57–74	3–3	13 – Bernard	8 – Townsend	6 – McConnell	UPMC Cooper Fieldhouse (819); Pittsburgh, PA
December 5, 2023; 6:00 p.m., SNPT/ESPN+		Fordham	W 75–73 ^{OT}	4–3 (1–0)	17 – Bernard	10 – Browne	6 – Bernard	UPMC Cooper Fieldhouse (815); Pittsburgh, PA
December 10, 2023*; 2:00 p.m., ESPN+		Kent State	W 89–82 ^{2OT}	5–3	20 – McConnell	13 – McConnell	6 – McConnell	UPMC Cooper Fieldhouse (1,054); Pittsburgh, PA
December 14, 2023*; 11:00 a.m.		Longwood	W 89–69	6–3	35 – Myers	6 – Ammons	9 – McConnell	Kerr Fitness Center (434); Pittsburgh, PA
December 16, 2023*; 2:00 p.m., ESPN+		at Vermont	L 61–77	6–4	14 – McConnell	8 – McConnell	2 – 4 tied	Patrick Gym (871); Burlington, VT
December 20, 2023*; 3:30 p.m.		vs. Maine; Tulane Holiday Tournament	L 72–80	6–5	18 – McConnell	6 – 2 tied	9 – McConnell	Devlin Fieldhouse (712); New Orleans, LA
December 21, 2023*; 12:00 p.m.		vs. Little Rock; Tulane Holiday Tournament	L 52–63	6–6	15 – Grantham-Medley	9 – McConnell	3 – Hamilton	Devlin Fieldhouse (565); New Orleans, LA
December 30, 2023; 8:00 p.m., ESPN+		at Dayton	W 70–42	7–6 (2–0)	16 – Bernard	8 – McConnell	6 – McConnell	UD Arena (2,249); Dayton, OH
January 7, 2024; 12:00 p.m., CBSSN		George Mason	L 75–101	7–7 (2–1)	14 – McConnell	11 – McConnell	7 – McConnell	UPMC Cooper Fieldhouse (924); Pittsburgh, PA
January 10, 2024; 6:00 p.m., ESPN+		at George Washington	W 71–54	8–7 (3–1)	13 – Grantham-Medley	11 – Hamilton	4 – Hamilton	Charles E. Smith Center (202); Washington, D.C.
January 13, 2024; 12:00 p.m., ESPN+		at Saint Joseph's	L 62–77	8–8 (3–2)	18 – Hamilton	6 – McConnell	4 – Myers	Hagan Arena (507); Philadelphia, PA
January 17, 2024; 6:00 p.m., SNPT/ESPN+		St. Bonaventure	W 76–67	9–8 (4–2)	17 – McConnell	13 – McConnell	6 – 2 tied	UPMC Cooper Fieldhouse (1,007); Pittsburgh, PA
January 21, 2024; 2:00 p.m., CBSSN		at Davidson	W 66–59	10–8 (5–2)	18 – Townsend	7 – 2 tied	2 – McConnell	John M. Belk Arena (803); Davidson, NC
January 24, 2024; 6:00 p.m., SNPT/ESPN+		Richmond	W 72–59	11–8 (6–2)	18 – Kiaku	14 – McConnell	3 – Hamilton	UPMC Cooper Fieldhouse (791); Pittsburgh, PA
January 28, 2024; 2:00 p.m., SNPT/ESPN+		Loyola Chicago	W 73–57	12–8 (7–2)	15 – Johnson	11 – Johnson	8 – McConnell	UPMC Cooper Fieldhouse (1,232); Pittsburgh, PA
January 31, 2024; 11:00 a.m., ESPN+		at VCU	L 51–64	12–9 (7–3)	14 – Hamilton	10 – McConnell	4 – McConnell	Siegel Center (5,324); Richmond, VA
February 3, 2024; 2:00 p.m., SNPT/ESPN+		Rhode Island	W 70–61	13–9 (8–3)	16 – Hamilton	9 – McConnell	9 – McConnell	UPMC Cooper Fieldhouse (1,175); Pittsburgh, PA
February 7, 2024; 6:00 p.m., SNPT/ESPN+		at UMass	W 79–62	14–9 (9–3)	15 – Bernard	9 – McConnell	7 – McConnell	Mullins Center (950); Amherst, MA
February 10, 2024; 2:00 p.m., SNPT/ESPN+		La Salle	W 57–52	15–9 (10–3)	15 – Johnson	12 – Johnson	3 – 4 tied	UPMC Cooper Fieldhouse (988); Pittsburgh, PA
February 14, 2024; 7:00 p.m., ESPN+		at St. Bonaventure	W 66–50	16–9 (11–3)	20 – McConnell	13 – McConnell	5 – McConnell	Reilly Center (112); St. Bonaventure, NY
February 17, 2024; 8:00 p.m., ESPN+		at Saint Louis	W 82–65	17–9 (12–3)	13 – Bernard	8 – Bernard	5 – 2 tied	Chaifetz Arena (1,013); St. Louis, MO
February 21, 2024; 11:00 a.m., SNPT/ESPN+		George Washington	W 79–69	18–9 (13–3)	18 – McConnell	8 – McConnell	4 – McConnell	UPMC Cooper Fieldhouse; Pittsburgh, PA
February 28, 2024; 6:00 p.m., ESPN+		at Richmond	L 74–90	18–10 (13–4)	20 – Bernard	8 – Hamilton	5 – McConnell	Robins Center (1,007); Richmond, VA
March 2, 2024; 2:00 p.m., SNPT/ESPN+		Saint Joseph's	L 73–77	18–11 (13–5)	18 – 2 tied	7 – 2 tied	5 – McConnell	UPMC Cooper Fieldhouse (1,812); Pittsburgh, PA
A-10 tournament
March 7, 2024; 1:30 p.m., ESPN+	(5)	vs. (13) UMass; Second round	W 81–57	19–11	21 – McConnell	13 – McConnell	6 – McConnell	Henrico Sports & Events Center (2,270); Henrico, VA
March 8, 2024; 1:30 p.m., ESPN+	(5)	vs. (4) George Mason; Quarterfinals	W 63–62	20–11	12 – Myers	10 – McConnell	6 – McConnell	Henrico Sports & Events Center (3,556); Henrico, VA
March 9, 2024; 11:00 a.m., CBSSN	(5)	vs. (1) Richmond; Semifinals	L 66–80	20–12	13 – Townsend	7 – Townsend	4 – McConnell	Henrico Sports & Events Center; Henrico, VA
WNIT
March 25, 2024*; 6:00 p.m., ESPN+		Monmouth; Second round	W 69–65 ^{OT}	21–12	16 – McConnell	10 – McConnell	3 – McConnell	UPMC Cooper Fieldhouse (1,625); Pittsburgh, PA
March 28, 2024*; 7:00 p.m., ESPN+		at Purdue; Super 16	L 50–71	21–13	19 – Kiaku	10 – McConnell	2 – McConnell	Mackey Arena (2,531); West Lafayette, IN
*Non-conference game. ^{#}Rankings from AP poll. (#) Tournament seedings in parentheses. All times are in Eastern.
