= Ginny Boggess =

American basketball player and coach

Current position
- Title: Head coach
- Team: Toledo
- Conference: MAC
- Record: 41–23 (.641)

Biographical details
- Born: September 13, 1981 (age 45); Hamlin, West Virginia, U.S.

Playing career
- 1999–2003: Wingate

Coaching career (HC unless noted)
- 2003–2004: Kennesaw State (GA)
- 2004–2006: Kennesaw State (asst.)
- 2006–2008: Hofstra (asst.)
- 2008–2013: Jacksonville (asst.)
- 2013–2014: Columbia (asst.)
- 2014–2019: Marquette (asst.)
- 2019–2021: Penn State (asst.)
- 2021–2024: Monmouth
- 2024–present: Toledo

Head coaching record
- Overall: 95–66 (.590)

Virginia Leigh Boggess (born September 13, 1981) is an American women's basketball head coach and former player. She is the current head coach of the University of Toledo women's basketball team. She previously served as the head coach at Monmouth University.

== Early life and education ==
Boggess is from Hamlin, West Virginia. She played college basketball for Wingate University from 1999 through 2003 where she received her bachelor's degree.

== Coaching career ==
Her first coaching job was a graduate assistant for the Kennesaw State in 2003. After one season she was hired as a full-time assistant where she remained until 2006. She spent three seasons as an assistant at Hofstra, five at Jacksonville State, and one at Columbia. In 2014 she was hired by Carolyn Kieger as an assistant when Kieger accepted the head coaching position at Marquette. In 2019 she followed Kieger to Penn State where she remained until she landed her first head coaching job.

=== Monmouth ===
On May 8, 2021, She was named the ninth head coach at Monmouth. She led the Hawks to a 54–42 record over three seasons. Her 2022–23 team went 18–16 in the regular season and, as the seventh seed, became the first team to win the CAA tournament by winning four games in four days. They lost to Tennessee Tech in a play-in game in the NCAA Tournament. During her final season Monmouth went 22–10.

=== Toledo ===
On April 9, 2024, She was named the tenth head coach at Toledo.

== Head coaching record ==
=== College ===
Record table
Season	Team	Overall	Conference	Standing	Postseason
Monmouth (Metro Atlantic Athletic Conference) (2021–2022)
2021–22	Monmouth	14–16	9–11	T–6th	
Monmouth (Coastal Athletic Association) (2022–2024)
2022–23	Monmouth	18–16	9–9	T–7th	NCAA First Four
2023–24	Monmouth	22–10	14–4	2nd	
Monmouth:		54–42 (.563)	32–24 (.571)		
Toledo (Mid-American Conference) (2024–present)
2024–25	Toledo	24–9	13–5	T–2nd	WBIT First Round
2025–26	Toledo	17–15	9–9	T–6th	
Toledo:		41–23 (.641)	22–14 (.611)		
Total:		95–66 (.590)			
National champion Postseason invitational champion Conference regular season champion Conference regular season and conference tournament champion Division regular season champion Division regular season and conference tournament champion Conference tournament champion
