= 2023 NCAA Women's Basketball All-Americans =

Honorary sports team

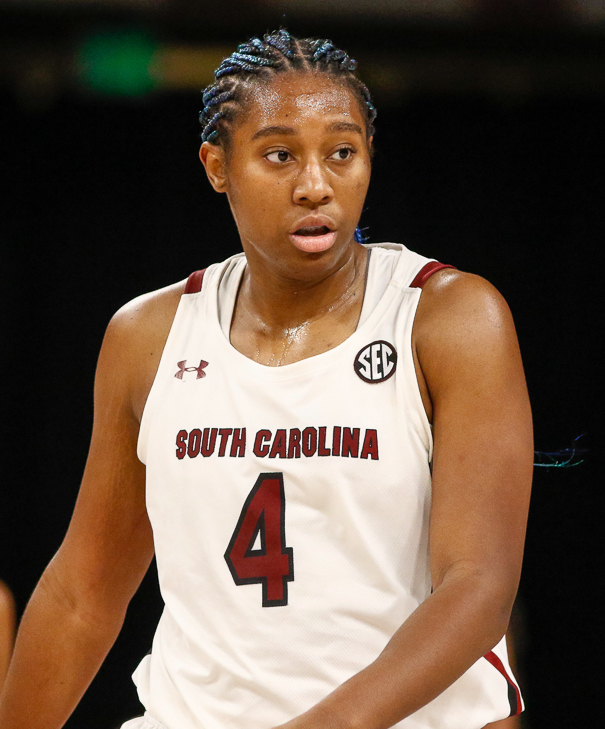
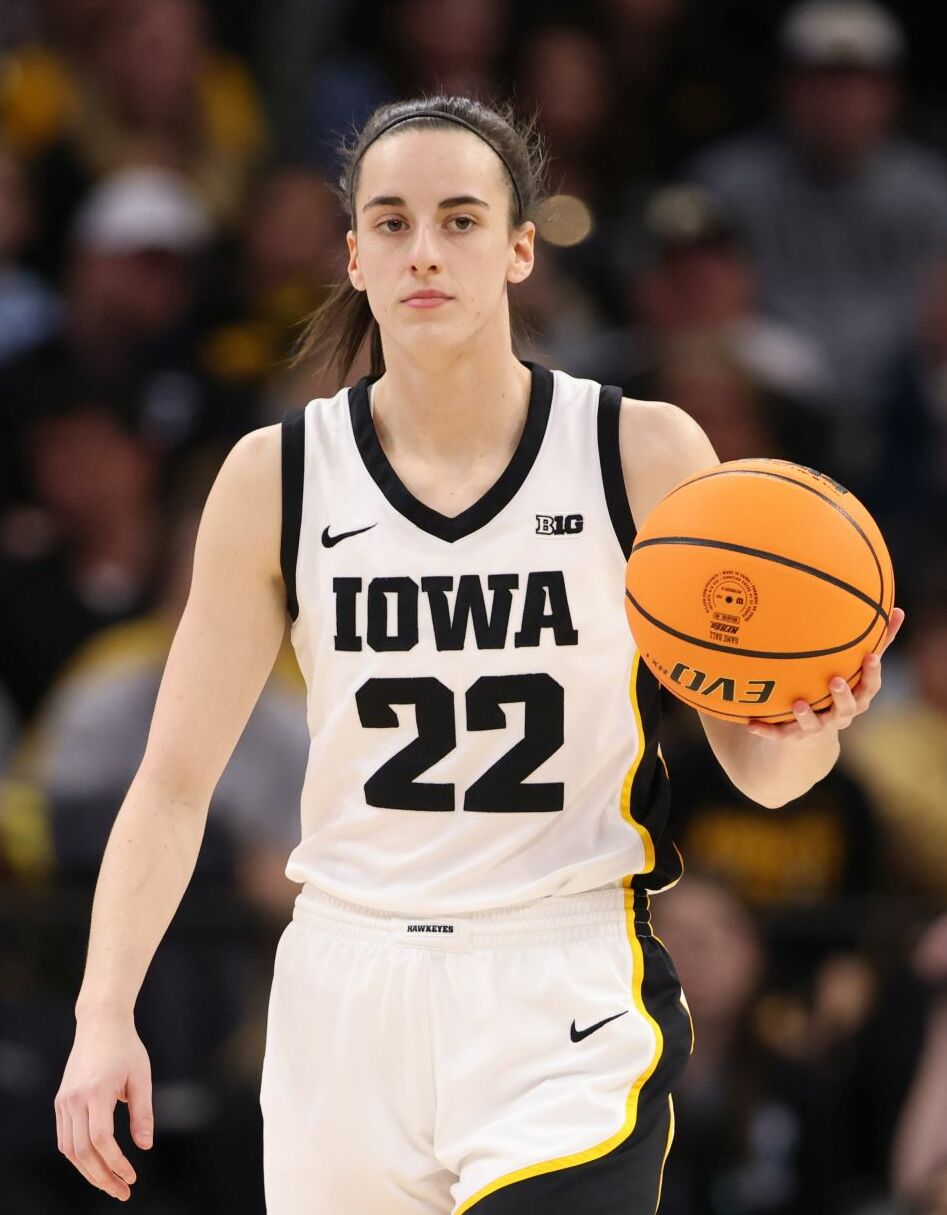
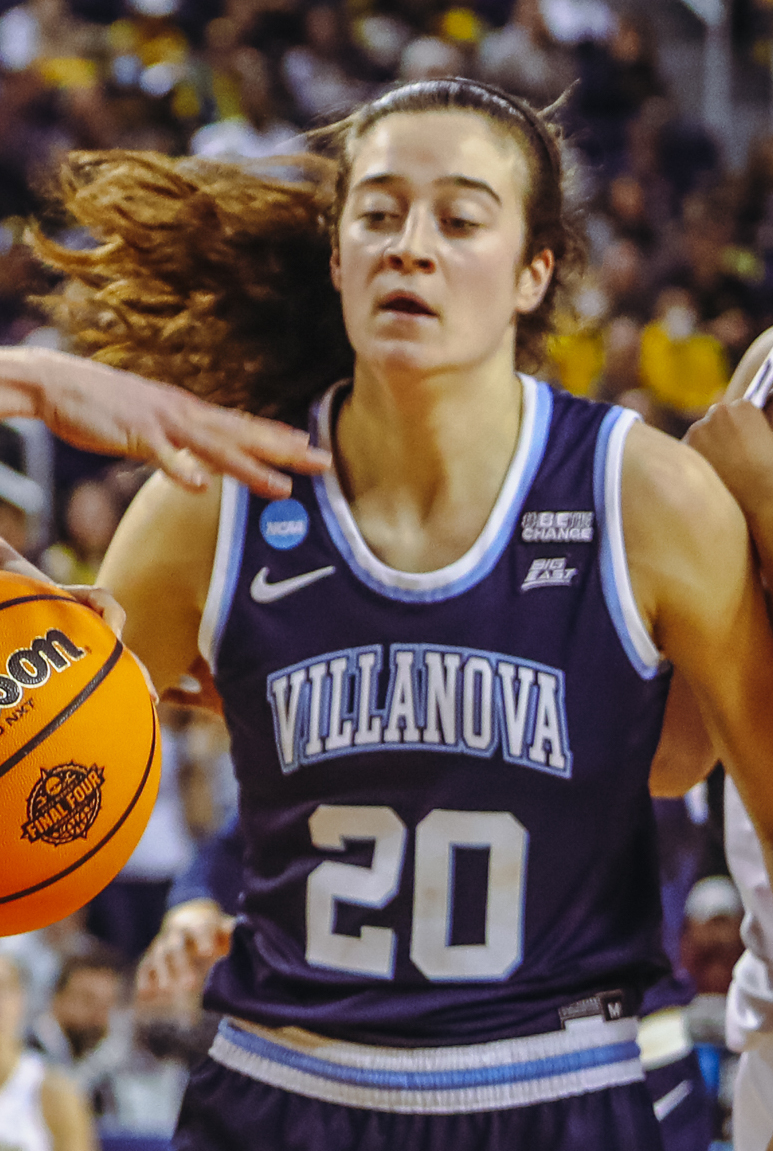
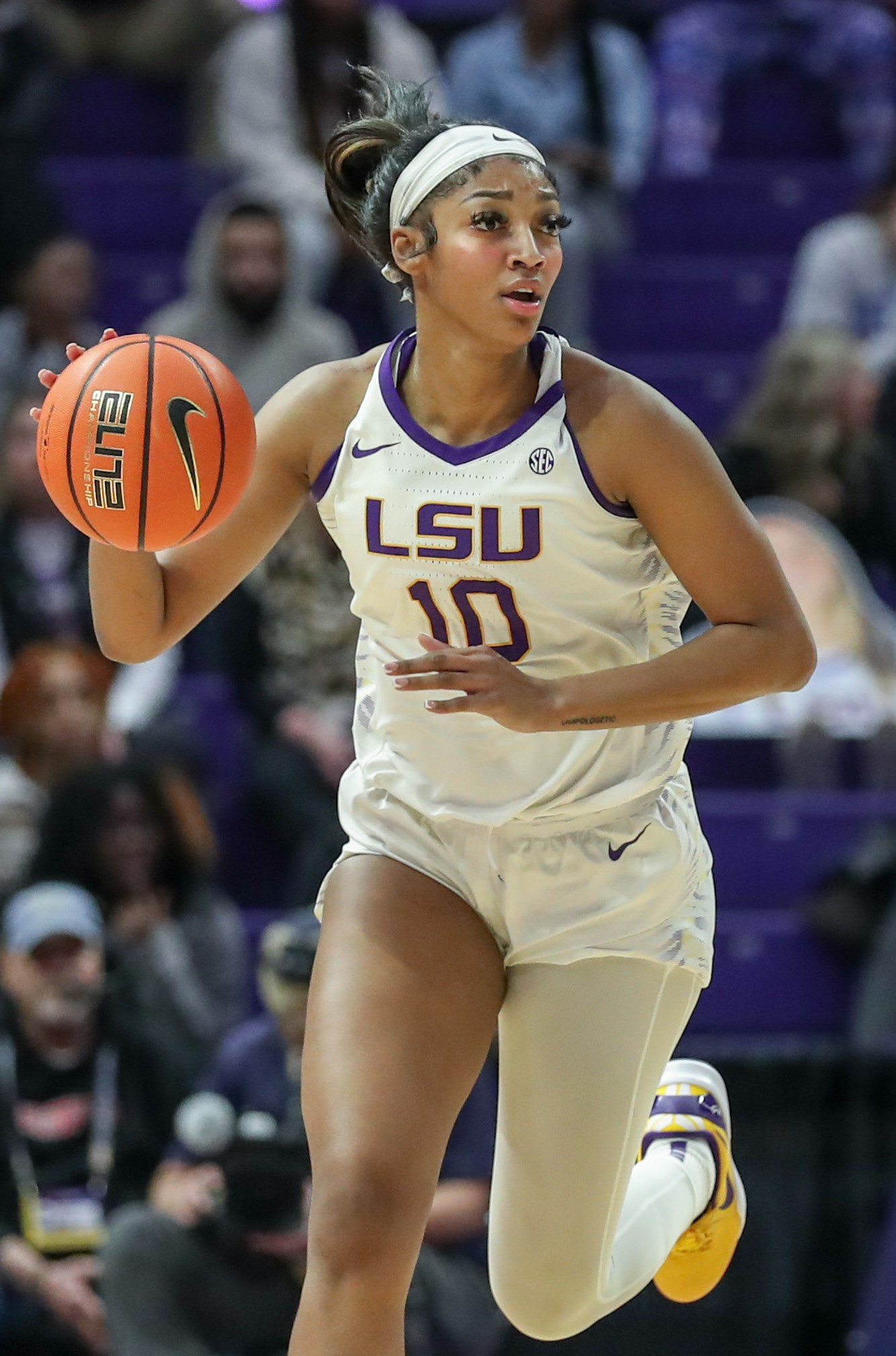
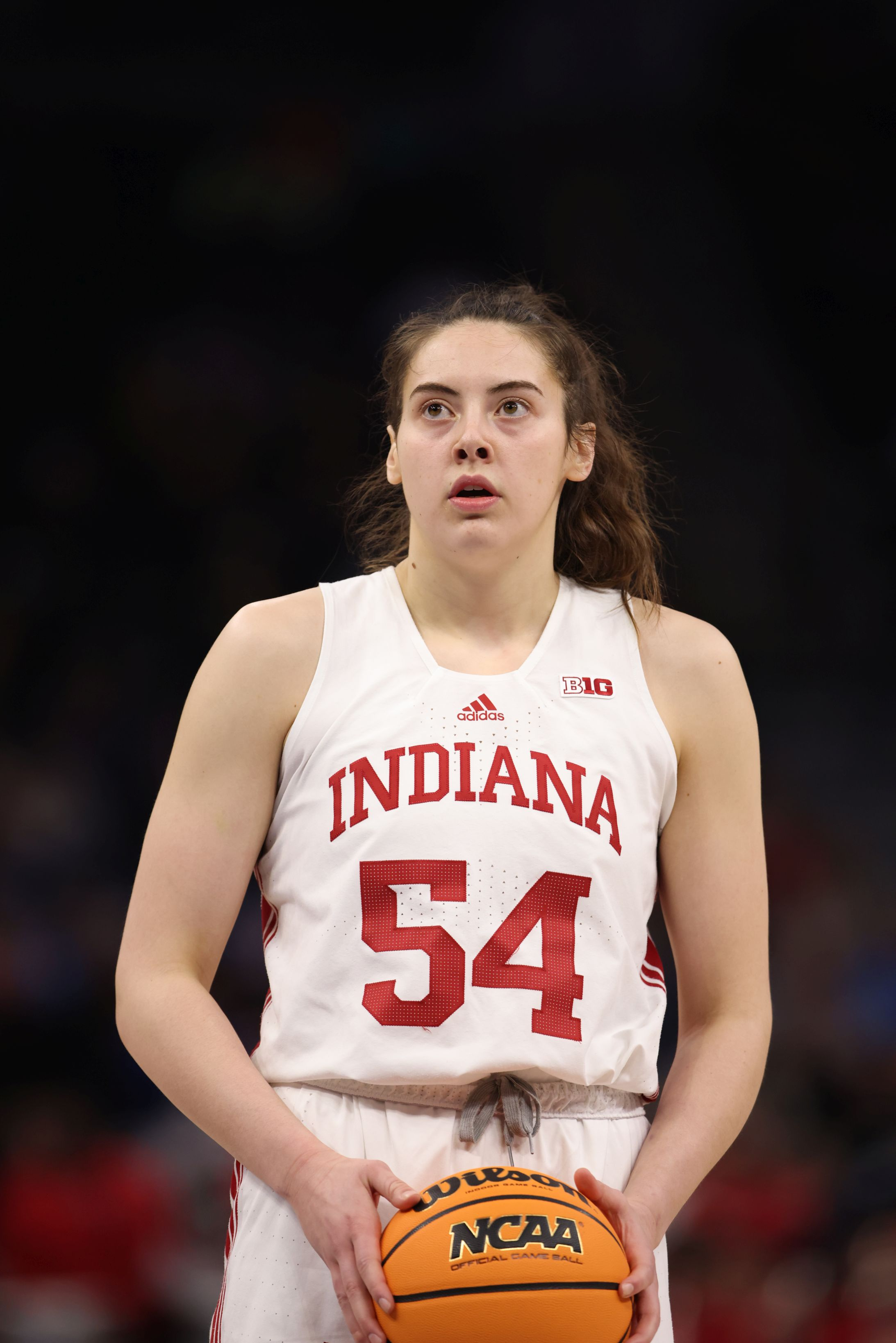
- Members of the 2023 All-America first team (AP, USBWA). Clockwise from upper left: Boston, Clark, Holmes, Reese and Siegrist.
- Awarded for: 2022–23 NCAA Division I women's basketball season

An All-American team is an honorary sports team composed of the best amateur players of a specific season for each team position—which in turn are given the honorific "All-America" and typically referred to as "All-American athletes", or simply "All-Americans". Although the honorees generally do not compete as a unit, the term is used in U.S. team sports to refer to players who national media members select. Walter Camp selected the first All-America team in the early days of American football in 1889. The 2023 NCAA Women's Basketball All-Americans are honorary lists that include All-American selections from the Associated Press (AP), the United States Basketball Writers Association (USBWA), and the Women's Basketball Coaches Association (WBCA) for the 2022–23 NCAA Division I women's basketball season. Both AP and USBWA choose three teams, while WBCA lists ten honorees.

A consensus All-America team in women's basketball has never been organized. This differs from the practice in men's basketball, in which the NCAA uses a combination of selections by AP, USBWA, the National Association of Basketball Coaches (NABC), and Sporting News to determine a consensus All-America team. The selection of a consensus All-America men's basketball team is possible because all four organizations select at least a first and second team, with only the USBWA not selecting a third team.

Before the 2017–18 season, a consensus women's All-America team couldn't be determined because the AP had been the only body that divided its women's selections into separate teams. The USBWA first named different teams in 2017–18. The women's counterpart to the NABC, the Women's Basketball Coaches Association (WBCA), continues the USBWA's former practice of selecting a single 10-member (plus ties) team. Before the 2023–24 season, Sporting News did not select an All-America team in women's basketball.

== By selector ==
=== Associated Press (AP) ===
Announced on March 15, 2023. The teams are selected by the same 28-member media panel that votes on the AP poll during the season. Of note:

- Aliyah Boston became the tenth player selected as a three-time first-team All-American.
- Boston and Caitlin Clark were unanimous first-team selections.

| First team | | Second team | | Third team | |
| Player | School | Player | School | Player | School |
|---|---|---|---|---|---|
| Aliyah Boston | South Carolina | Elizabeth Kitley | Virginia Tech | Ashley Joens | Iowa State |
| Caitlin Clark | Iowa | Cameron Brink | Stanford | Aaliyah Edwards | UConn |
| Maddy Siegrist | Villanova | Diamond Miller | Maryland | Aneesah Morrow | DePaul |
| Angel Reese | LSU | Olivia Miles | Notre Dame | Haley Jones | Stanford |
| Mackenzie Holmes | Indiana | Alissa Pili | Utah | Zia Cooke | South Carolina |

==== AP Honorable Mention ====
Honorable mention selections are those who did not make one of the first three teams, but received at least one vote from the media panel.

- Georgia Amoore, Virginia Tech
- Brea Beal, South Carolina
- Grace Berger, Indiana
- Leigha Brown, Michigan
- Sonia Citron, Notre Dame
- Makira Cook, Illinois
- Monika Czinano, Iowa
- Rori Harmon, Texas
- McKenna Hofschild, Colorado State
- Jordan Horston, Tennessee
- Rickea Jackson, Tennessee
- Ta'Niya Latson, Florida State
- Charlisse Leger-Walker, Washington State
- Lou Lopez Sénéchal, UConn
- Nika Mühl, UConn
- Charisma Osborne, UCLA
- Celeste Taylor, Duke
- Kaylynne Truong, Gonzaga
- Hailey Van Lith, Louisville
- Keishana Washington, Drexel
- Madi Williams, Oklahoma

=== United States Basketball Writers Association (USBWA) ===
The USBWA announced its 15-member team, divided into first, second, and third teams, plus honorable mention selections, on March 15, 2023. Vote totals were not released.

| First team | | Second team | | Third team | |
| Player | School | Player | School | Player | School |
|---|---|---|---|---|---|
| Aliyah Boston | South Carolina | Cameron Brink | Stanford | Zia Cooke | South Carolina |
| Caitlin Clark | Iowa | Ashley Joens | Iowa State | Aaliyah Edwards | UConn |
| Mackenzie Holmes | Indiana | Elizabeth Kitley | Virginia Tech | Haley Jones | Stanford |
| Angel Reese | LSU | Diamond Miller | Maryland | Olivia Miles | Notre Dame |
| Maddy Siegrist | Villanova | Alissa Pili | Utah | Aneesah Morrow | DePaul |

==== USBWA Honorable Mention ====
- Grace Berger, Indiana
- Rickea Jackson, Tennessee
- Ta'Niya Latson, Florida State
- Hailey Van Lith, Louisville
- Keishana Washington, Drexel

=== Women's Basketball Coaches Association (WBCA) ===
Announced on March 30, 2023.

| Player | School |
|---|---|
| Aliiyah Boston | South Carolina |
| Cameron Brink | Stanford |
| Caitlin Clark | Iowa |
| Mackenzie Holmes | Indiana |
| Ashley Joens | Iowa State |
| Elizabeth Kitley | Virginia Tech |
| Diamond Miller | Maryland |
| Alissa Pili | Utah |
| Angel Reese | LSU |
| Maddy Siegrist | Villanova |

== Academic All-Americans ==
College Sports Communicators (known before the 2022–23 season as the College Sports Information Directors of America) announced its 2022 Academic All-America team on March 16, 2022, divided into first, second, and third teams, with Caitlin Clark of Iowa chosen as women's college basketball Academic All-American of the Year. Due to a tie for the fifth spot on the second team, the overall team had 16 members instead of the usual 15.

First Team
| Player | School | Class | GPA and major |
|---|---|---|---|
| Caitlin Clark (Note: First team in 2021–22.) | Iowa | Jr. | 3.60, Marketing |
| Aliyah Boston (Note: Academic All-American of the Year in 2020–21 and 2021–22.) | South Carolina | Sr. | 3.76, Mass Communications |
| Mary Crompton (Note: Third team in 2021–22.) | Illinois State | GS | 4.00/4.00, Biology (UG) / Biological Studies (G) |
| Mackenzie Holmes | Indiana | Sr. | 3.62, Human Development & Family Studies |
| Elizabeth Kitley | Virginia Tech | Sr. | 3.95, Human Nutrition, Foods & Exercise |

Second Team
| Player | School | Class | GPA and major |
|---|---|---|---|
| Grace Berger | Indiana | GS | 3.89/3/94, Sports Marketing & Management (UG) / Athletic Administration (G) |
| Hannah Jump | Stanford | Sr. | 3.75, Psychology |
| Charlisse Leger-Walker | Washington State | Jr. | 3.91, Management |
| Myah Selland (Note: Second team in 2020–21 and 2021–22.) | South Dakota State | Sr. | 3.98, Community & Public Health |
| Hailey Van Lith | Louisville | Jr. | 3.84, Finance |
| Keishana Washington | Drexel | GS | 3.74/4.00, Psychology (UG & G) |

Third Team
| Player | School | Class | GPA and major |
|---|---|---|---|
| Olivia Brown | Valparaiso | Sr. | 4.00, Communications |
| Mackenzie Kramer | Lehigh | Sr. | 4.00, Population Health |
| Makenna Marisa (Note: Third team in 2021–22.) | Penn State | Sr. | 3.81, Elementary & Early Childhood Education |
| Aneesah Morrow | DePaul | So. | 3.75, Communication & Media |
| Lauren Ross | Western Michigan | So. | 4.00, Psychology |
