= 2023 CAA women's basketball tournament =

- Classification: Division I
- Season: 2022–23
- Teams: 13
- Site: SECU Arena; Towson, Maryland
- Champions: Monmouth (1st title)
- Winning coach: Ginny Boggess (1st title)
- MVP: Bri Tinsley (Monmouth)
- Television: FloHoops, CBSSN
- CAA women's basketball tournaments

2022–23 CAA women's basketball standings
	Conf.				Overall
Team	W		L	PCT	W		L	PCT
Towson	13	–	5	.722	21	–	11	.656
Drexel	13	–	5	.722	21	–	10	.677
Northeastern	13	–	5	.722	19	–	12	.613
William & Mary	12	–	6	.667	18	–	13	.581
North Carolina A&T	12	–	6	.667	18	–	12	.600
Stony Brook	11	–	7	.611	18	–	13	.581
Monmouth †	9	–	9	.500	18	–	16	.529
Delaware	9	–	9	.500	16	–	14	.533
Hampton	8	–	10	.444	12	–	18	.400
Charleston	6	–	12	.333	11	–	18	.379
Elon	5	–	13	.278	9	–	21	.300
Hofstra	4	–	14	.222	12	–	20	.375
UNC Wilmington	2	–	16	.111	5	–	25	.167
† 2023 CAA tournament winner As of March 17, 2023; Rankings from AP poll

The 2023 Colonial Athletic Association women's basketball tournament was the postseason women's college basketball tournament for the Colonial Athletic Association for the 2022–23 NCAA Division I women's basketball season. The tournament was held March 8–12, 2023 at the SECU Arena in Towson, Maryland. Monmouth won the tournament to claim the conference's automatic bid to the 2023 NCAA tournament, marking the Hawks' first NCAA tournament appearance since 1983. The seventh-seeded Hawks were also the lowest seed ever to win the CAA women's tournament, defeating all three of the top seeds in the process, and were also the first CAA team to win four games in consecutive days to win the tournament.

This was the final women's basketball tournament held under the Colonial Athletic Association name. On July 20, 2023, the CAA announced it had changed its name to Coastal Athletic Association. The name change did not affect the CAA initialism, and the conference kept its existing logo.

== Seeds ==
Seed	School	Conf.	Tiebreaker
1	Towson	13-5	2-1 vs. Drexel/Northeastern
2	Drexel	13-5	2-2 vs. Towson/Northeastern
3	Northeastern	13-5	1-2 vs. Towson/Drexel
4	William & Mary	12-6	1-0 vs. North Carolina A&T
5	North Carolina A&T	12-6	0-1 vs. William & Mary
6	Stony Brook	11-7	
7	Monmouth	9-9	1-0 vs. Delaware
8	Delaware	9-9	0-1 vs. Monmouth
9	Hampton	8-10	
10	Charleston	6-12	
11	Elon	5-13	
12	Hofstra	4-14	
13	UNC Wilmington	2-16	

== Schedule ==
Session	Game	Time*	Matchup	Score	Television
First Round – Wednesday, March 8
1	1	2:00 pm	No. 12 Hofstra vs. No. 13 UNC Wilmington	61–58	FloHoops
Second Round – Thursday, March 9
2	2	12:00 pm	No. 8 Delaware vs. No. 9 Hampton	67–78	FloHoops
2	3	2:30 pm	No. 5 North Carolina A&T vs. No. 12 Hofstra	59–66	FloHoops
3	4	5:00 pm	No. 7 Monmouth vs. No. 10 Charleston	69–54	FloHoops
3	5	8:30 pm	No. 6 Stony Brook vs. No. 11 Elon	54–51	FloHoops
Quarterfinals – Friday, March 10
4	6	12:00 pm	No. 1 Towson vs. No. 9 Hampton	87–65	FloHoops
4	7	2:30 pm	No. 4 William & Mary vs. No. 12 Hofstra	74–64	FloHoops
5	8	6:00 pm	No. 2 Drexel vs. No. 7 Monmouth	59–65	FloHoops
5	9	8:30 pm	No. 3 Northeastern vs. No. 6 Stony Brook	85–68	FloHoops
Semifinals – Saturday, March 11
6	10	2:00 pm	No. 1 Towson vs. No. 4 William & Mary	76-59	FloHoops
6	11	4:30 pm	No. 7 Monmouth vs. No. 3 Northeastern	73-60	FloHoops
Championship – Sunday, March 12
7	12	2:00 pm	No. 1 Towson vs. No. 7 Monmouth	55-80	CBSSN
*Game times in ET. Rankings denote tournament seed

== Bracket ==
First Round; Wednesday, March 8 FloHoops
12	Hofstra	61
13	UNC Wilmington	58

Second Round; Thursday, March 9 FloHoops
8	Delaware	67
9	Hampton	78
5	North Carolina A&T	59
12	Hofstra	66
7	Monmouth	69
10	Charleston	54
6	Stony Brook	54
11	Elon	51

Quarterfinals; Friday, March 10; FloHoops
1	Towson	87
9	Hampton	65
4	William & Mary	74
12	Hofstra	64
2	Drexel	59
7	Monmouth	65
3	Northeastern	85
6	Stony Brook	68

Semifinals; Saturday, March 11; FloHoops
1	Towson	76
4	William & Mary	59
7	Monmouth	73
3	Northeastern	60

Championship; Sunday, March 12; CBS Sports Network
1	Towson	55
7	Monmouth	80

* denotes overtime game
