= 2022–23 Drexel Dragons women's basketball team =

Women's basketball team

2022–23 Drexel Dragons women's basketball

CAA regular season co-champions

WNIT, first round
- Conference: Colonial Athletic Association
- Record: 21–10 (13–5 CAA)
- Head coach: Amy Mallon (3rd season)
- Assistant coaches: Stacy Weiss (11th season); Belle Koclanes (1st season)
- MVP: Keishana Washington
- Home arena: Daskalakis Athletic Center

2022–23 CAA women's basketball standings
	Conf.				Overall
Team	W		L	PCT	W		L	PCT
Towson	13	–	5	.722	21	–	11	.656
Drexel	13	–	5	.722	21	–	10	.677
Northeastern	13	–	5	.722	19	–	12	.613
William & Mary	12	–	6	.667	18	–	13	.581
North Carolina A&T	12	–	6	.667	18	–	12	.600
Stony Brook	11	–	7	.611	18	–	13	.581
Monmouth †	9	–	9	.500	18	–	16	.529
Delaware	9	–	9	.500	16	–	14	.533
Hampton	8	–	10	.444	12	–	18	.400
Charleston	6	–	12	.333	11	–	18	.379
Elon	5	–	13	.278	9	–	21	.300
Hofstra	4	–	14	.222	12	–	20	.375
UNC Wilmington	2	–	16	.111	5	–	25	.167
† 2023 CAA tournament winner As of March 17, 2023; Rankings from AP poll

The 2022–23 Drexel Dragons women's basketball team represented Drexel University during the 2022–23 NCAA Division I women's basketball season. The Dragons, led by third-year head coach Amy Mallon, played their home games at the Daskalakis Athletic Center in Philadelphia, Pennsylvania as members of the Colonial Athletic Association.

On December 18, in a game against Penn State, Keishana Washington set the school record for most points scored in regulation with 42 points. On March 17, 2023, Washington again broke the record in the first round of the WNIT scoring 43 points.

On January 1, 2023, in a game against Towson, Maura Hendrixson set the school record for most assists in a single game with 14 assists.

== Previous season ==
The Dragons finished the 2021–22 season 28–6, 16–2 in CAA play to finish in first place. They lost to Delaware in the CAA tournament championship. As conference regular season champions, the team earned an automatic bid to the 2022 Women's National Invitation Tournament, where they were defeated by Seton Hall in the third round.

== Offseason ==
=== Departures ===
Name	Number	Pos.	Height	Year	Hometown	Notes
Tessa Brugler	3	F	6'1"	RS Senior	Nazareth, PA	Graduated
Hannah Nihill	12	G	5'3"	Senior	Drexel Hill, PA	Graduated
Kate Connolly	20	F	6'1"	Senior	Harleysville, PA	Graduated
Mariah Leonard	30	F	5'10"	RS Senior	Ashburn, VA	Graduated

=== Recruiting classes ===
==== 2022 recruiting class ====
College recruiting information
Name	Hometown	School	Height	Weight	Commit date
Grace O'Neill; G	Radnor, PA	Archbishop John Carroll HS	5 ft 7 in (1.70 m)	N/A	Nov 2, 2020
Grace O'Neill; G	Recruit ratings: No ratings found				
Jennifer Martin; SG	Westford, MA	Bradford Christian Academy (MA)	5 ft 10 in (1.78 m)	155 lb (70 kg)	Nov 3, 2020
Jennifer Martin; SG	Recruit ratings: No ratings found				
Kylie Lavelle; PG	Taylor, PA	Riverside HS (NJ)	6 ft 2 in (1.88 m)	145 lb (66 kg)	Nov 8, 2020
Kylie Lavelle; PG	Recruit ratings: No ratings found				
Moriah Murray; PG	Dunmore, PA	Dunmore HS	5 ft 8 in (1.73 m)	N/A	Nov 13, 2020
Moriah Murray; PG	Recruit ratings: No ratings found				
Jalyn McNeill; F	Olney, MD	Our Lady of Good Counsel HS (MD)	5 ft 9 in (1.75 m)	N/A	Mar 13, 2021
Jalyn McNeill; F	Recruit ratings: No ratings found				
Overall recruit ranking:
Note: In many cases, Scout, Rivals, 247Sports, On3, and ESPN may conflict in their listings of height and weight.; In these cases, the average was taken. ESPN grades are on a 100-point scale.; Sources: "Drexel 2022 Basketball Commitments". Rivals.; "Drexel Dragons". ESPN.; "2022 Team Ranking". Rivals.; "Drexel 2022 Basketball Commits". 247Sports.

==== 2023 recruiting class ====
College recruiting information (2023)
Name	Hometown	School	Height	Weight	Commit date
Laine McGurk; SF	West Chester, PA	West Chester Rustin HS	5 ft 10 in (1.78 m)	N/A	Dec 2, 2021
Laine McGurk; SF	Recruit ratings: No ratings found				
Clara Bergeron; SF	Saint-Jean-sur-Richelieu, Quebec	Cégep de Saint-Jean-sur-Richelieu	N/A	N/A	Jul 29, 2022
Clara Bergeron; SF	Recruit ratings: No ratings found				
Overall recruit ranking:
Note: In many cases, Scout, Rivals, 247Sports, On3, and ESPN may conflict in their listings of height and weight.; In these cases, the average was taken. ESPN grades are on a 100-point scale.; Sources: "Drexel 2023 Basketball Commitments". Rivals.; "Drexel Dragons". ESPN.; "2023 Team Ranking". Rivals.; "Drexel 2023 Basketball Commits". 247Sports.

== Preseason ==
In a poll of the league coaches at the CAA's media day, Drexel was picked to finish in first place in the CAA. Keishana Washington was named to the Preseason All-CAA First Team, and also selected as the Preseason CAA Player of the Year.

== Roster ==
2022–23 Drexel Dragons women's basketball team
Players
Coaches

Pos.	#	Name	Height	Year	Previous school	Hometown
G	1	Keishana Washington	5 ft 7 in (1.7 m)		Durham Elite Prep	Pickering, Canada
F	2	Hetta Saatman	6 ft 2 in (1.88 m)	Sr	Linden Hall	Lancaster, PA
G	3	Moriah Murray	5 ft 9 in (1.75 m)	Fr	Dunmore HS	Dunmore, PA
G	4	Jalyn McNeill	5 ft 9 in (1.75 m)	Fr	Our Lady of Good Counsel HS (MD)	Damascus, MD
F	5	Chloe Hodges	6 ft 0 in (1.83 m)	Jr	St Michael's	Adelaide, Australia
F	10	Brianne Borcky	6 ft 0 in (1.83 m)	Sr	Garnet Valley HS	Garnet Valley, PA
G	11	Tori Hyduke	5 ft 6 in (1.68 m)	RS Sr	Rumson-Fair Haven/George Washington	Fair Haven, NJ
G	12	Grace O'Neill	5 ft 7 in (1.7 m)	Fr	Archbishop John Carroll HS	West Chester, PA
G	13	Erin Sweeney	5 ft 10 in (1.78 m)	Jr	Archbishop John Carroll HS	Havertown, PA
F	14	Kylie Lavelle	6 ft 2 in (1.88 m)	Fr	Riverside HS (NJ)	Moosic, PA
G	20	Jennifer Martin	5 ft 10 in (1.78 m)	Fr	Bradford Christian Academy (MA)	Westford, MA
F	21	Jasmine Valentine	5 ft 11 in (1.8 m)	Jr	St. Vincent Pallotti HS	Odenton, MD
G	22	Maura Hendrixson	5 ft 9 in (1.75 m)		Cardinal O'Hara HS (PA)	Garnet Valley, PA
G	23	Momo LaClair	5 ft 10 in (1.78 m)	So	Jamesville-DeWitt	Syracuse, NY
F	24	Sira Ba	5 ft 11 in (1.8 m)	So	Antoine-de-St-Exupéry	Montreal, Canada

Head coach

- Amy Mallon (Saint Joseph's)

Assistant coach(es)

- Stacy Weiss (Drexel)
- Belle Koclanes (Richmond)

Legend

- (C) Team captain
- (S) Suspended
- (I) Ineligible
- (W) Walk-on
- Injured
- Current redshirt

Roster
Last update: August 8, 2022

== Schedule and results ==
Date time, TV	Rank^{#}	Opponent^{#}	Result	Record	High points	High rebounds	High assists	Site (attendance) city, state
Non-conference regular season
November 10, 2022*; 6:00 pm		Rider	W 84–58	1–0	34 – Washington	6 – Tied	7 – Hendrixson	Daskalakis Athletic Center (1,093); Philadelphia, PA
November 15, 2022*; 12:00 pm, ESPN+		at La Salle	L 74–77	1–1	31 – Lavelle	9 – Lavelle	10 – Hendrixson	Tom Gola Arena (562); Philadelphia, PA
November 19, 2022*; 2:00 pm		Maryland Eastern Shore	W 66–61	2–1	37 – Washington	7 – Washington	8 – Hendrixson	Daskalakis Athletic Center (533); Philadelphia, PA
November 22, 2022*; 6:00 pm, NBCSPHI+		Lehigh	W 84–61	3–1	33 – Washington	7 – 3 Tied	10 – Washington	Daskalakis Athletic Center (504); Philadelphia, PA
November 27, 2022*; 12:00 pm, ESPN+		at Buffalo	W 53–35	4–1	15 – Washington	9 – O'Neill	8 – Hendrixson	Alumni Arena (925); Buffalo, NY
November 30, 2022*; 6:00 pm, ESPN+		at Longwood	W 74–61	5–1	25 – Washington	6 – 3 Tied	6 – Washington	Willett Hall (412); Farmville, VA
December 4, 2022*; 2:00 pm, ESPN+		at Saint Joseph's	L 49–69	5–2	28 – Washington	7 – Hendrixson	4 – Washington	Hagan Arena (533); Philadelphia, PA
December 11, 2022*; 12:00 pm, ESPN+		at Yale	L 58–60 ^{OT}	5–3	33 – Washington	12 – Valentine	4 – Hendrixson	Payne Whitney Gymnasium (274); New Haven, CT
December 13, 2022*; 1:00 pm, ESPN+		at Dartmouth	W 64–49	6–3	32 – Washington	6 – Tied	5 – Tied	Leede Arena (1,842); Hanover, NH
December 18, 2022*; 2:00 pm, NBCSPHI		Penn State	W 86–82	7–3	42 – Washington	6 – O'Neill	7 – Hendrixson	Daskalakis Athletic Center (989); Philadelphia, PA
December 21, 2022*; 12:00 pm		Delaware State	W 62–44	8–3	21 – Washington	7 – O'Neill	5 – Hyduke	Daskalakis Athletic Center (604); Philadelphia, PA
CAA regular season
December 29, 2022; 7:00 pm		at UNC Wilmington	W 71–47	9–3 (1–0)	21 – Washington	4 – 2 Tied	6 – 2 Tied	Trask Coliseum (563); Wilmington, NC
January 1, 2023; 2:00 pm		Towson	W 75–67	10–3 (2–0)	19 – 2 Tied	6 – O'Neill	14 – Hendrixson	Daskalakis Athletic Center (474); Philadelphia, PA
January 6, 2023; 6:00 pm, NBCSPHI		Delaware	W 73–57	11–3 (3–0)	30 – Washington	6 – Hendrixson	13 – Hendrixson	Daskalakis Athletic Center (514); Philadelphia, PA
January 8, 2023; 2:00 pm		Stony Brook	W 81–64	12–3 (4–0)	27 – Washington	8 – O'Neill	11 – Hendrixson	Daskalakis Athletic Center (623); Philadelphia, PA
January 13, 2023; 7:00 pm		at Hampton	W 67–51	13–3 (5–0)	19 – O'Neill	7 – Saatman	6 – Hendrixson	Hampton Convocation Center (348); Hampton, VA
January 15, 2023; 2:00 pm		at William & Mary	L 58–74	13–4 (5–1)	27 – Washington	11 – Valentine	4 – Hendrixson	Kaplan Arena (506); Williamsburg, VA
January 22, 2023; 2:00 pm		at Towson	L 61–70	13–5 (5–2)	27 – Washington	4 – Valentine	12 – Hendrixson	SECU Arena (845); Towson, MD
January 27, 2023; 6:00 pm, NBCSPHI		Hofstra	W 69–57	14–5 (6–2)	24 – Washington	6 – 2 Tied	11 – Hendrixson	Daskalakis Athletic Center (619); Philadelphia, PA
January 29, 2023; 1:00 pm		Elon	W 61–49	15–5 (7–2)	16 – Washington	8 – Hodges	4 – Hendrixson	Daskalakis Athletic Center (403); Philadelphia, PA
February 3, 2023; 7:00 pm		at Northeastern	W 67–56	16–5 (8–2)	29 – Washington	6 – Hendrixson	6 – Hendrixson	Matthews Arena (186); Boston, MA
February 5, 2023; 2:00 pm		at Stony Brook	W 66–65	17–5 (9–2)	40 – Washington	6 – Levelle	9 – Hendrixson	Island Federal Credit Union Arena (1,068); Stony Brook, NY
February 10, 2023; 6:00 pm		Charleston	L 61–86	18–5 (10–2)	28 – Lavelle	8 – Valentine	11 – Washington	Daskalakis Athletic Center (583); Philadelphia, PA
February 12, 2023; 3:00 pm, NBCSPHI/SNY		at Monmouth	L 66–70	18–6 (10–3)	32 – Washington	6 – Valentine	8 – Hendrixson	OceanFirst Bank Center (470); West Long Branch, NJ
February 17, 2023; 6:00 pm, NBCSPHI		Northeastern	W 71–64	18–7 (10–4)	33 – Washington	5 – 2 Tied	6 – Hendrixson	Daskalakis Athletic Center (755); Philadelphia, PA
February 19, 2023; 2:00 pm		at Delaware	W 67–55	19–7 (11–4)	40 – Washington	7 – Hendrixson	7 – Hendrixson	Bob Carpenter Center (2,716); Newark, DE
February 24, 2023; 7:00 pm		at Hofstra	W 58–34	20–7 (12–4)	21 – Washington	7 – O'Neill	10 – Hendrixson	Mack Sports Complex (392); Hempstead, NY
February 26, 2023; 2:00 pm		William & Mary	W 55–47	21–7 (13–4)	20 – Washington	8 – O'Neill	9 – Hendrixson	Daskalakis Athletic Center (674); Philadelphia, PA
March 4, 2023; 3:00 pm		North Carolina A&T	L 57–59	21–8 (13–5)	23 – Washington	7 – Lavelle	9 – Hendrixson	Daskalakis Athletic Center (703); Philadelphia, PA
CAA Tournament
March 10, 2023; 6:00 pm	(2)	vs. (7) Monmouth; Quarterfinal	L 59–65	21–9	32 – Washington	8 – Valentine	12 – Hendrixson	SECU Arena (250); Towson, MD
WNIT
March 16, 2023; 7:00 pm, ESPN+		at Fordham; First round	L 63–73	21–10	43 – Washington	7 – O'Neill	3 – O'Neill	Rose Hill Gymnasium (348); Bronx, NY
*Non-conference game. ^{#}Rankings from AP. (#) Tournament seedings in parentheses. All times are in Eastern Time.

== Awards ==
Maura Hendrixson

- Meghan Creighton Assist Award (team leader in assists)

Chloe Hodges

- Liz Berry Most Improved Award (team's most improved player)

Kylie Lavelle

- CAA All-Rookie Team
- CAA Rookie of the Week (4)

Grace O’Neill

- CAA All-Rookie Team
- CAA Rookie of the Week (2)
- Team Defensive Player of the Year
- Rebounding Award (team leader in rebounds)
- Charge Leader Award (team leader in charges drawn)
- Lil Haas Coaches Award

Keishana Washington

- CAA Player of the Year
- CAA All-Conference First Team
- AP All-American Honorable Mention
- USBWA All-American Honorable Mention
- Academic All-American
- Becky Hammon Mid-Major Player of the Year Award Semifinalist
- USBWA National Player of the Week
- CAA Player of the Week (5)
- Preseason CAA Player of the Year
- Preseason CAA All-Conference First Team
- Team Most Valuable Player
- Mo Cronin Spirit & Leadership Award
- Steven Sher Academic Award

== Rankings ==
+ Regular season polls	Poll	Pre- Season	Week 2	Week 3	Week 4	Week 5	Week 6	Week 7	Week 8	Week 9	Week 10	Week 11	Week 12	Week 13	Week 14	Week 15	Week 16	Week 17	Week 18	Week 19	Final
AP																				N/A	
Coaches									RV	RV											

Legend
	Increase in ranking
	Decrease in ranking
	Not ranked previous week
RV	Received votes
NR	Not ranked
( )	Number of first place votes

== See also ==
- 2022–23 Drexel Dragons men's basketball team
