= Dan Burt =

American college basketball coach

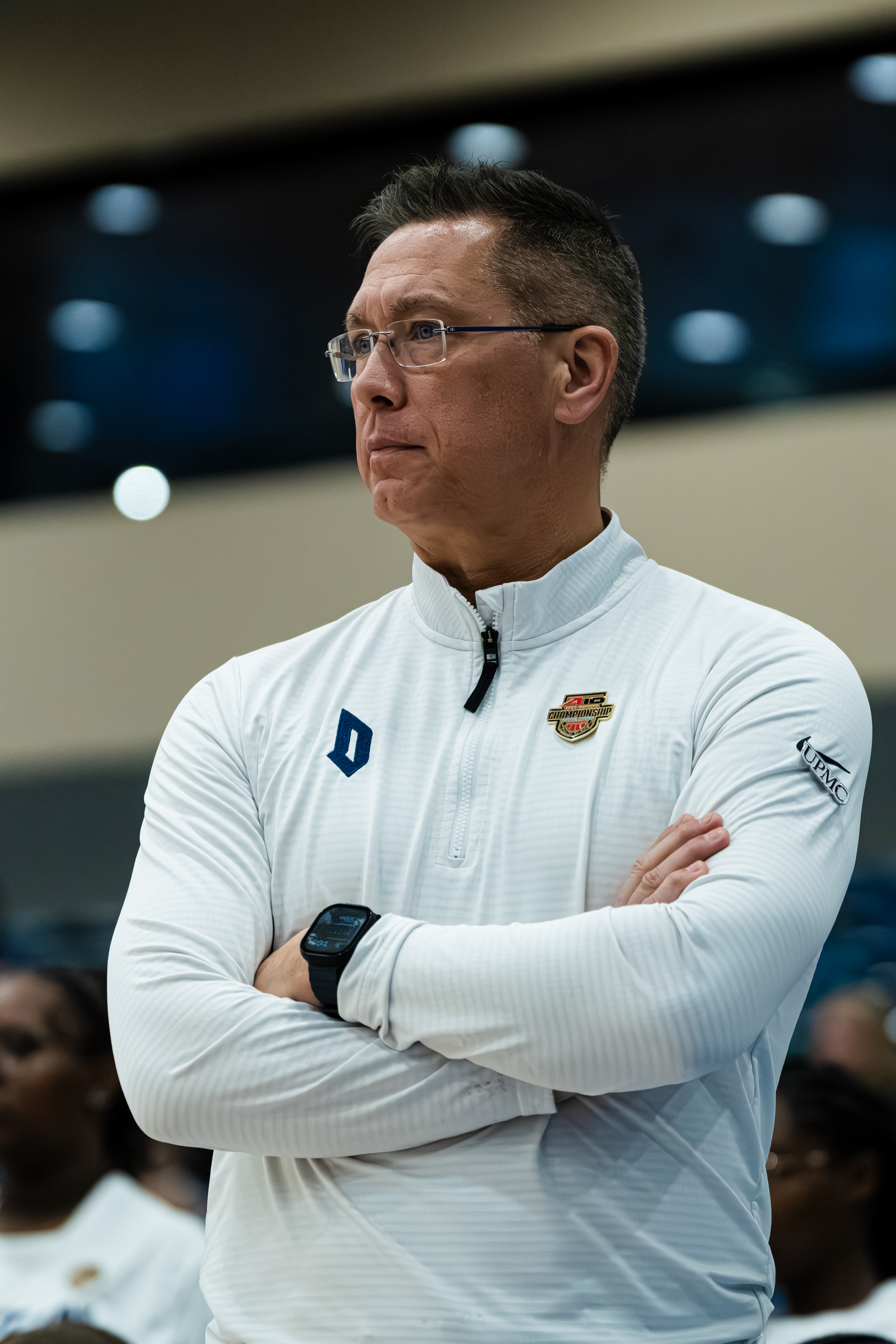
- Burt in 2026 at the A10 Women's Basketball Championships at the Henrico Sports & Events Center

Current position
- Title: Head coach
- Team: Duquesne
- Conference: Atlantic 10
- Record: 242–164 (.596)

Biographical details
- Born: August 12, 1970 (age 56); Washington, Pennsylvania

Playing career
- 198?–199?: West Liberty

Coaching career (HC unless noted)
- 1998–2001: West Virginia (assistant)
- 2001–2004: UNC Wilmington (assistant)
- 2004–2007: Bucknell (assistant)
- 2007–2013: Duquesne (assistant)
- 2013–present: Duquesne

Head coaching record
- Overall: 242–164 (.596)

Dan Burt is the Head Women's Basketball Coach at the Duquesne University.

== Career ==
He has been a Division One Women's Basketball coach for 22 years with assistant coaching stops at West Virginia University (3 years), UNC Wilmington (3 years), and Bucknell (3 years) and Duquesne University (6 years). Burt played collegiately at West Liberty State

== Head coaching record ==
- Duquesne
- A10

Record table
| Season | Team | Overall | Conference | Standing | Postseason |
|---|---|---|---|---|---|
Duquesne Dukes (Atlantic 10 Conference) (2013–Present)
| 2013–14 | Duquesne | 20–13 | 10–6 | T-5th | WNIT Second Round |
| 2014–15 | Duquesne | 23–11 | 12–4 | 3rd | WNIT Third Round |
| 2015–16 | Duquesne | 28–6 | 13–3 | T-1st | NCAA Second Round |
| 2016–17 | Duquesne | 18–16 | 8–8 | T-7th | WNIT First Round |
| 2017–18 | Duquesne | 25–8 | 13–3 | 2nd | WNIT Third Round |
| 2018–19 | Duquesne | 19–13 | 11–5 | T-3rd | |
| 2019–20 | Duquesne | 20–11 | 9–7 | T-4th | |
| 2020–21 | Duquesne | 5–11 | 4–7 | 9th | |
| 2021–22 | Duquesne | 11–18 | 6–10 | T–9th | |
| 2022–23 | Duquesne | 19–12 | 8–8 | T–9th | |
| 2023–24 | Duquesne | 21–13 | 13–5 | 5th | WNIT Super 16 |
| 2024–25 | Duquesne | 21–13 | 9–9 | T–8th | WNIT Super 16 |
| 2025–26 | Duquesne | 12–19 | 4–14 | T–12th | |
| Duquesne: | | 242–164 (.596) | 120–88 (.577) | | |
| Total: | | 242–164 (.596) | | | |
National champion Postseason invitational champion Conference regular season champion Conference regular season and conference tournament champion Division regular season champion Division regular season and conference tournament champion Conference tournament champion
