= Monmouth Hawks women's basketball =

2025–26 Monmouth Hawks women's basketball team
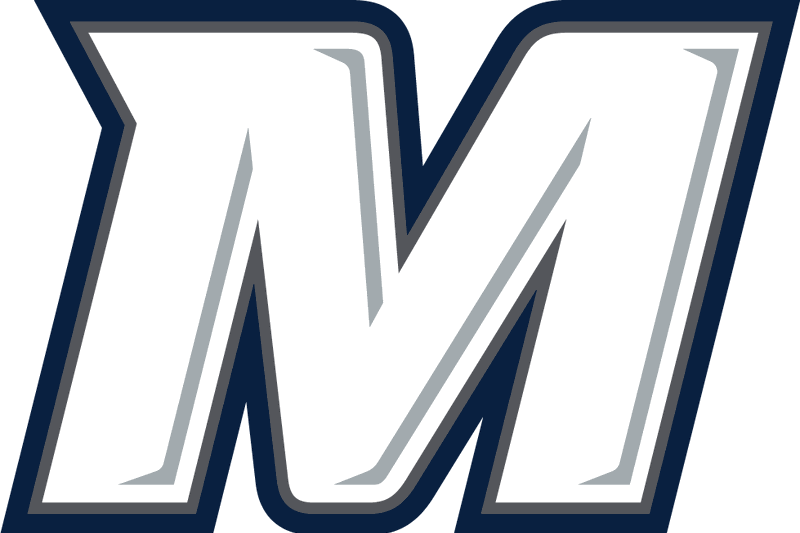
- University: Monmouth University
- Head coach: Cait Wetmore (3rd season)
- Location: West Long Branch, New Jersey
- Arena: OceanFirst Bank Center (capacity: 4,291)
- Conference: Coastal Athletic Association
- Nickname: Hawks
- Colors: Midnight blue and white

NCAA Division I tournament First Four
- 2023

NCAA Division I tournament appearances
- 1983, 2023

Conference tournament champions
- NEC: 1987; CAA: 2023

Conference regular-season champions
- NEC: 1987, 1988

The Monmouth Hawks women's basketball is the official team that represents Monmouth University in West Long Branch, New Jersey, United States. The school's team currently competes in the Coastal Athletic Association.

== History ==
Monmouth began play in 1982. They played in the Cosmopolitan Conference from 1982 to 1986. In 1983, the Hawks went 14–14 while winning the Cosmopolitan Conference and getting the automatic bid to the NCAA Tournament. That year, they won the Opening round game versus Dartmouth 77–58 to advance to the First Round. They lost 107–35 to Cheyney. This remains their only NCAA Tournament appearance. They joined the ECAC Metro in 1986, which rebranded as the Northeast Conference in 1988. The Hawks won the NEC tournament in 1987 going 16–0 in conference play while beating Fairleigh Dickinson 92–65 for their first (and so far only) conference tournament title. However, they did not go to the NCAA Tournament due to the conference not having an automatic bid to the tournament until 1994. In 1988, they won the regular season title again with a 16–0 record, but they lost to Robert Morris 63–60 in the final. The Hawks left the conference for the MAAC after the 2012–13 season. As of the end of the 2015–16 season, the Hawks have an all-time record of 520–473.

In the 2020–21 season, they went 2–16 and lost in the first round of the MAAC tournament. The team has not achieved a winning record since the 2011–2012 season. On March 11, 2021, former head coach Jody Craig resigned two days after a suspension. On April 8, 2021, Ginny Boggess was named the ninth head women's basketball coach in program history.

== Season-by-season results ==
Record table
Season	Coach	Overall	Conference	Standing	Postseason
Milt Parker (Cosmopolitan) (1982–1984)
1982–83	Monmouth	15–15			NCAA Division I First Round
1983–84	Monmouth	16–12	3–7		
Milt Parker:		29–30 (.492)	0–0 (–)		
Mickey McGlade (Cosmopolitan) (1984–1986)
1984–85	Monmouth	16–12	4–6		
1985–86	Monmouth	17–13	4–5		
Mickey McGlade (ECAC Metro) (1986–1988)
1986–87	Monmouth	6–22	3–9		
1987–88	Monmouth	18–11	7–5		
Mickey McGlade (Northeast Conference) (1988–1989)
1988–89	Monmouth	21–9	6–6		
Mickey McGlade:		99–46 (.683)	(–)		
Sue DeKalb (Northeast Conference) (1989–2000)
1989–90	Monmouth	7–21	3–11		
1990–91	Monmouth	4–23	2–12		
1991–92	Monmouth	11–17	3–7		
1992–93	Monmouth	13–15	4–6		
1993–94	Monmouth	9–18	4–8		
1994–95	Monmouth	7–20	4–8		
1995–96	Monmouth	8–19	4–10		
1996–97	Monmouth	17–11	6–8		
1997–98	Monmouth	21–9	10–6		
1998–99	Monmouth	22–9	12–4		
1999–00	Monmouth	18–13	9–7		
Sue DeKalb:		141–165 (.461)	(–)		
Jackie DeVane (Northeast Conference) (2000–2004)
2000–01	Monmouth	22–10	9–7		
2001–02	Monmouth	27–5	11–3		
2002–03	Monmouth	23–8	11–3		
2003–04	Monmouth	15–16	5–9		
Jackie DeVane and Michele Baxter (Northeast Conference) (–present)
2004–05	Monmouth	9–19	4–10		
Jackie DeVane :		74–56 (.569)	(–)		
Michele Baxter (Northeast Conference) (–present)
2005–06	Monmouth	17–12	7–9		
2006–07	Monmouth	15–14	6–10		
2007–08	Monmouth	12–16	3–13		
Michele Baxter :		51–51 (.500)	(–)		
Stephanie V. Gaitley (Northeast Conference) (–present)
2008–09	Monmouth	14–17	3–13		
2009–10	Monmouth	12–18	4–12	14th	
2010–11	Monmouth	9–20	2–14	15th	
Stephanie V. Gaitley:		57–37 (.606)	(–)		
Jenny Palmateer (Northeast Conference) (2011–2013)
2011–12	Monmouth	16–16	6–10	T–10th	
2012–13	Monmouth	12–18	4–12	13th	
Jenny Palmateer (Metro Atlantic Athletic Conference) (2013–2017)
2013–14	Monmouth	13–18	5–11	8th	
2014–15	Monmouth	8–23	4–14	9th	
2015–16	Monmouth	8–22	4–14	9th	
2016–17	Monmouth	15–16	9–11		
Jenny Palmateer and Jody Craig (Metro Atlantic Athletic Conference) (2011–2018)
2017–18	Monmouth	10–21	7–11		
Jenny Palmateer:		86–111 (.437)	(–)		
Jody Craig (Metro Atlantic Athletic Conference) (2018–2021)
2018–19	Monmouth	14–14	9–9		
2019–20	Monmouth	9–22	5–15		Cancelled
2020–21	Monmouth	2–16	2–11		
Jody Craig:		33–69 (.324)	(–)		
Ginny Boggess (Metro Atlantic Athletic Conference) (2021–2022)
2021–22	Monmouth	14–16	9–11		
Ginny Boggess (Coastal Athletic Association) (2022–present)
2022–23	Monmouth	18–15	9–9	7th	NCAA Division I
Ginny Boggess:		32–31(.500)	18–19 (.486)		
Total:		000–000			
National champion Postseason invitational champion Conference regular season champion Conference regular season and conference tournament champion Division regular season champion Division regular season and conference tournament champion Conference tournament champion

=== NCAA Division I appearances ===
The Hawks have made two NCAA Division I Tournament appearance. They have a record of 1–2.

Year	Round	Opponent	Result
1983	Opening Round; First Round	Dartmouth; Cheyney	W 77–58; L 35–107
2023	First Four	Tennessee Tech	L 69–79
