= Duquesne Dukes women's basketball =

American college basketball team

Duquesne Dukes
2026–27 Duquesne Dukes women's basketball team
- University: Duquesne University
- Head coach: Dan Burt (12th season)
- Location: Pittsburgh, Pennsylvania
- Arena: UPMC Cooper Fieldhouse (capacity: 3,500)
- Conference: Atlantic 10
- Nickname: Dukes
- Colors: Red and blue

NCAA Division I tournament second round
- 2016

NCAA Division I tournament appearances
- 2016

Uniforms
Home	Away	Alternate

The Duquesne Dukes women's basketball team represent Duquesne University, located in Pittsburgh, Pennsylvania in NCAA Division I basketball competition. They play in the Atlantic 10 Conference

== History ==
Duquesne started play in 1974, joining Division I and the Atlantic 10 in 1984. As of the end of the 2015–16 season, the Dukes have an all-time record of 561–578, with a Division I record of 457–507. They have made the NCAA Tournament once and they have made the WNIT seven times.

Year	Seed	Round	Opponent	Result
2016	#9	First Round; Second Round	(8) Seton Hall (1) Connecticut	W 97–76; L 51–97
