= 2022–23 Wyoming Cowgirls basketball team =

Intercollegiate basketball season

2022–1923 Wyoming Cowgirls basketball

WNIT, second round
- Conference: Mountain West Conference
- Record: 23–11 (13–5 Mountain West)
- Head coach: Heather Ezell (1st season)
- Assistant coaches: Ryan Larsen; Fallon Lewis; Brooke Atkinson
- Home arena: Arena-Auditorium

2022–23 Mountain West Conference women's basketball standings
	Conf.				Overall
Team	W		L	PCT	W		L	PCT
No. 22 UNLV†	18	–	0	1.000	31	–	3	.912
Wyoming	13	–	5	.722	23	–	11	.676
San Diego State	12	–	6	.667	23	–	11	.676
Colorado State	12	–	6	.667	20	–	12	.625
New Mexico	12	–	6	.667	21	–	12	.636
Boise State	11	–	7	.611	17	–	16	.515
Air Force	8	–	10	.444	13	–	18	.419
Nevada	6	–	12	.333	10	–	21	.323
Fresno State	3	–	15	.167	10	–	22	.313
San Jose State	3	–	15	.167	6	–	25	.194
Utah State	1	–	17	.056	4	–	26	.133
† 2023 MW Tournament winner As of March 21, 2023; Rankings from AP poll

The 2022–23 Wyoming Cowgirls basketball team represented the University of Wyoming in the 2022–23 college basketball season. The Cowgirls were led by first-year head coach Heather Ezell. The Cowgirls played their home games at the Arena-Auditorium in Laramie, Wyoming and were members of the Mountain West Conference. The Cowgirls finished second in the Mountain West Conference, and lost in the championship game of the Mountain West Conference women's basketball tournament to UNLV. The Cowgirls were invited to the WNIT, and lost in the second round to Kansas State.

== Previous season ==
The Cowgirls finished the 2021–22 season 17–13, 11–6 in Mountain West play, to finish tied for third place in the conference. They lost in the quarterfinal round of the Mountain West Conference women's basketball tournament to Colorado State. Head coach Gerald Mattinson announced his retirement from coaching at the conclusion of the season, and Heather Ezell was hired as the new head coach the same day.

== Offseason ==
=== Departures ===
Name	Number	Pos.	Height	Year	Hometown	Reason for departure
Alba Sanchez Ramos	11	G	6' 0"	Sr.	Madrid, Spain	Graduated
McKinley Bradshaw	12	G	5' 11"	Jr.	Lyman, WY	Mission (LDS Church)
Landri Hudson	21	G	5' 9"	So.	Aurora, CO	Transferred to CSU Pueblo

=== Arrivals ===
Name	Number	Pos.	Height	Year	Hometown	Previous school
Bailey Wilborn	1	G	5' 8"	So.	Wichita, KS	Maine
Grace Moyers	3	G	5' 8"	Fr.	Erie, CO	Erie HS
Malene Pedersen	12	G	5' 11"	Fr.	Aabyhøj, Denmark	Kansas State

== Roster ==
2022–23 Wyoming Cowgirls women's basketball team
Players
Coaches

Pos.	#	Name	Height	Year	Previous school	Hometown
G	1	Bailey Wilborn	5 ft 8 in (1.73 m)	So	Maine	Wichita, KS
G	2	Emily Mellema	5 ft 11 in (1.8 m)	So	Lynden Christian HS	Lynden, WA
G	3	Grace Moyers	5 ft 8 in (1.73 m)	Fr	Erie HS	Erie, CO
F	4	Grace Ellis	6 ft 0 in (1.83 m)	Jr	St Peters Lutheran College	Brisbane, Australia
G/F	5	Tess Barnes	6 ft 2 in (1.88 m)	So	Maribyrnong College	Gisborne, Australia
F	10	Paula Salazar	6 ft 3 in (1.91 m)	Jr	Institute Vilanova del Valles	Barcelona, Spain
G	12	Malene Pedersen	5 ft 11 in (1.8 m)	RS Fr	Kansas State	Aabyhøj, Denmark
G	14	Quinn Weidemann	5 ft 9 in (1.75 m)		Westside HS	Omaha, NE
F	15	Marta Savic	6 ft 1 in (1.85 m)	Jr	Sport Gymnasium	Zagreb, Croatia
G/F	23	Lexi Bull	6 ft 0 in (1.83 m)	Jr	Century HS	Pocatello, ID
G	24	Tommi Olson	5 ft 6 in (1.68 m)		Highlands Ranch HS	Worland, WY
G	30	Ola Ustowska	5 ft 10 in (1.78 m)	Jr	SMS PZKosz Lomianki	Kartuzy, Poland
C	45	Allyson Fertig	6 ft 4 in (1.93 m)	So	Douglas HS	Glendo, WY

Head coach

- Heather Ezell (Iowa State)

Assistant coach(es)

- Ryan Larsen (MSU Moorhead)
- Fallon Lewis (Wyoming)
- Brooke Atkinson (Wichita State)

Legend

- (C) Team captain
- (S) Suspended
- (I) Ineligible
- (W) Walk-on
- Injured
- Current redshirt

Roster
Last update: November 7, 2023

== Statistics ==
Player	GP	GS	MPG	FG%	3FG%	FT%	RPG	APG	SPG	BPG	PPG
Tess Barnes	34	2	19.1	.383	.324	.727	2.6	1.2	.6	.5	4.6
Lexi Bull	4	0	2.3	.500	—	—	.8	.5	.0	.0	.5
Grace Ellis	34	34	25.8	.483	.360	.723	4.5	1.7	.4	.2	8.7
Allyson Fertig	34	34	24.3	.586	.154	.697	8.7	.8	.7	2.0	13.3
Emily Mellema	34	0	19.5	.400	.353	.736	1.6	1.7	.9	.2	6.3
Grace Moyers	13	0	4.0	.188	—	.750	.4	.0	.2	.0	.9
Tommi Olson	34	34	26.0	.378	.403	.760	3.5	2.8	.7	.1	4.4
Malene Pedersen	34	34	28.9	.467	.321	.882	4.0	2.4	.5	.1	11.0
Paula Salazar	8	0	5.4	.500	.000	.750	1.5	.0	.1	.3	1.4
Marta Savic	34	0	12.1	.500	1.000	.703	3.8	.9	.6	.4	4.1
Ola Ustowska	29	0	11.9	.228	.193	.727	.9	.8	.3	.2	1.9
Quinn Weidemann	32	32	32.8	.397	.356	.847	2.4	2.4	1.0	.2	10.9
Bailey Wilborn	10	0	6.7	.313	.333	.750	.3	.1	.1	.0	1.8

== Schedule ==
Date time, TV	Rank^{#}	Opponent^{#}	Result	Record	Site (attendance) city, state
Exhibition
October 28, 2022*; 6:30 p.m.		Colorado Christian	W 68–36	0–0	Arena-Auditorium (1,504); Laramie, WY
November 5, 2022*; 2:00 p.m.		Sioux Falls	W 87–40	0–0	Arena-Auditorium (1,952); Laramie, WY
Non-conference
November 11, 2022*; 1:00 p.m.		at North Dakota	L 55–67	0–1	Betty Engelstad Sioux Center (1,166); Grand Forks, ND
November 15, 2022*; 8:00 p.m.		Gonzaga	L 64–66	0–2	Arena-Auditorium (2,077); Laramie, WY
November 18, 2022*; 6:30 p.m.		Denver	W 68–45	1–2	Arena-Auditorium (2,233); Laramie, WY
November 22, 2022*; 11:00 a.m.		Regis	W 64–44	2–2	Arena-Auditorium (5,792); Laramie, WY
November 25, 2022*; 3:00 p.m.		at Pacific; Tiger Turkey Tip-Off	L 53–67	2–3	Alex G. Spanos Center (227); Stockton, CA
November 26, 2022*; 1:00 p.m.		vs. UC Davis; Tiger Turkey Tip-Off	W 67–48	3–3	Alex G. Spanos Center (107); Stockton, CA
December 2, 2022*; 6:30 p.m.		Montana State	W 67–59	4–3	Arena-Auditorium (2,174); Laramie, WY
December 5, 2022*; 6:30 p.m.		New Mexico Highlands	W 80–24	5–3	Arena-Auditorium (2,075); Laramie, WY
December 11, 2022*; 6:30 a.m.		Kansas City	W 72–43	6–3	Arena-Auditorium (2,286); Laramie, WY
December 18, 2022*; 2:00 p.m.		at Nebraska	L 39–66	6–4	Pinnacle Bank Arena (4,972); Lincoln, NE
December 20, 2022*; 6:00 p.m.		at Wichita State	W 61–56	7–4	Charles Koch Arena (1,488); Wichita, KS
Mountain West Conference
December 29, 2022; 6:30 p.m.		at UNLV	L 67–73	7–5 (0–1)	Cox Pavilion (526); Paradise, NV
December 31, 2022; 6:00 p.m.		Fresno State	W 77–72 ^{2OT}	8–5 (1–1)	Arena-Auditorium (2,432); Laramie, WY
January 5, 2023; 6:30 p.m.		New Mexico	W 78–69	9–5 (2–1)	Arena-Auditorium (1,942); Laramie, WY
January 11, 2023; 6:30 p.m.		at Air Force	W 61–60	10–5 (3–1)	Clune Arena (660); Colorado Springs, CO
January 14, 2023; 2:00 p.m.		at San Jose State	W 64–48	11–5 (4–1)	Provident Credit Union Event Center (355); San Jose, CA
January 16, 2023; 6:30 p.m.		at Nevada	W 57–53	12–5 (5–1)	Lawlor Events Center (739); Reno, NV
January 19, 2023; 6:30 p.m.		UNLV	L 57–71	12–6 (5–2)	Arena-Auditorium (2,307); Laramie, WY
January 21, 2023; 6:00 p.m.		San Diego State	L 66–73	12–7 (5–3)	Arena-Auditorium (2,647); Laramie, WY
January 26, 2023; 6:00 p.m.		at Utah State	W 64–52	13–7 (6–3)	Smith Spectrum (312); Logan, UT
January 28, 2023; 2:00 p.m.		at Boise State	W 69–62	14–7 (7–3)	ExtraMile Arena (1,059); Boise, ID
February 2, 2023; 6:30 p.m.		San Jose State	W 68–54	15–7 (8–3)	Arena-Auditorium (2,040); Laramie, WY
February 4, 2023; 1:00 p.m.		at Colorado State; Border War	L 63–66	15–8 (8–4)	Moby Arena (2,141); Fort Collins, CO
February 9, 2023; 6:30 p.m.		Utah State	W 70–48	16–8 (9–4)	Arena-Auditorium (2,227); Laramie, WY
February 11, 2023; 2:00 p.m.		Air Force	W 62–56	17–8 (10–4)	Arena-Auditorium (2,790); Laramie, WY
February 16, 2023; 7:00 p.m.		at New Mexico	L 62–71	17–9 (10–5)	The Pit (4,668); Albuquerque, NM
February 18, 2023; 1:00 p.m.		at San Diego State	W 70–58	18–9 (11–5)	Viejas Arena (1,138); San Diego, CA
February 23, 2023; 6:30 p.m.		Nevada	W 81–66	19–9 (12–5)	Arena-Auditorium (2,144); Laramie, WY
February 25, 2023; 7:30 p.m.		Colorado State; Border War	W 76–60	20–9 (13–5)	Arena-Auditorium (3,603); Laramie, WY
Mountain West women's tournament
March 6, 2023; 5:00 p.m.	(2)	vs. (10) San Jose State; Quarterfinals	W 72–57	21–9	Thomas & Mack Center; Paradise, NV
March 7, 2023; 7:30 p.m.	(2)	vs. (3) Colorado State; Semifinals, Border War	W 65–56	22–9	Thomas & Mack Center; Paradise, NV
March 8, 2023; 7:00 p.m.	(2)	vs. (1) No. 21 UNLV; Championship	L 60–71	22–10	Thomas & Mack Center; Paradise, NV
WNIT
March 17, 2023; 6:30 p.m.		Texas A&M–Corpus Christi; First round	W 75–41	23–10	Arena-Auditorium (2,820); Laramie, WY
March 21, 2023; 6:00 p.m.		at Kansas State; Second round	L 55–71	23–11	Bramlage Coliseum (2,350); Manhattan, KS
*Non-conference game. ^{#}Rankings from AP poll. (#) Tournament seedings in parentheses. All times are in Mountain.
