= 2022–23 Southern Utah Thunderbirds women's basketball team =

American college basketball season

2022–23 Southern Utah Thunderbirds women's basketball

WAC regular-season and tournament champions

NCAA tournament, first round
- Conference: Western Athletic Conference
- Record: 23–10 (16–2 WAC)
- Head coach: Tracy Sanders (5th season)
- Associate head coach: Katie Gruys
- Assistant coaches: Jay Johnson; Hailey Mandelko
- Home arena: America First Events Center

2022–23 WAC women's basketball standings
| | Conf. | | | | Overall |
| Team | W | | L | PCT | W | | L | PCT |
|---|---|---|---|---|---|---|---|---|
| Southern Utah† | 16 | – | 2 | .889 | 23 | – | 10 | .697 |
| Stephen F. Austin | 15 | – | 3 | .833 | 26 | – | 6 | .813 |
| California Baptist | 13 | – | 5 | .722 | 22 | – | 13 | .629 |
| Grand Canyon | 12 | – | 6 | .667 | 21 | – | 10 | .677 |
| Utah Tech* | 10 | – | 8 | .556 | 19 | – | 12 | .613 |
| New Mexico State | 10 | – | 8 | .556 | 18 | – | 17 | .514 |
| Abilene Christian | 9 | – | 9 | .500 | 15 | – | 15 | .500 |
| UT Arlington | 8 | – | 10 | .444 | 14 | – | 17 | .452 |
| Sam Houston | 8 | – | 10 | .444 | 13 | – | 17 | .433 |
| UT Rio Grande Valley | 6 | – | 12 | .333 | 12 | – | 18 | .400 |
| Seattle | 5 | – | 13 | .278 | 6 | – | 24 | .200 |
| Utah Valley | 3 | – | 15 | .167 | 6 | – | 24 | .200 |
| Tarleton* | 2 | – | 16 | .111 | 8 | – | 21 | .276 |
† 2023 WAC tournament winner * Ineligible for the 2023 NCAA tournament due to transition from Division II; As of March 18, 2023

The 2022–23 Southern Utah Thunderbirds women's basketball team represented Southern Utah University during the 2022–23 NCAA Division I women's basketball season. The Thunderbirds were led by fifth-year head coach Tracy Sanders and played their home games at America First Events Center in Cedar City, Utah. They were members of the Western Athletic Conference (WAC).

The Thunderbirds finished the season 23–10, 16–2 in WAC play, to finish as WAC regular-season champions. They defeated New Mexico State, Grand Canyon and California Baptist in the WAC tournament to send themselves to their first NCAA tournament appearance in program history. They received the #14 seed in the Greenville 1 Region, where they fell to #3 region seed Notre Dame in the first round.

== Roster ==
2022–23 Southern Utah Thunderbirds women's basketball team
Players
Coaches

| Pos. | # | Name | Height | Year | Previous school | Hometown |
|---|---|---|---|---|---|---|
| G | 0 | Kinlee Sorensen | 5 ft 9 in (1.75 m) | Jr | Emery High School; USU Eastern | Orangeville, UT |
| G | 1 | Alexa Lord | 5 ft 9 in (1.75 m) | Sr | Richfield High School | Richfield, UT |
| G | 2 | Tomekia Whitman | 5 ft 10 in (1.78 m) | Sr | Central Valley; Idaho State | Spokane, WA |
| C | 3 | Megan Jensen | 6 ft 3 in (1.91 m) | Sr | Emery High School; Utah Valley | Castle Dale, UT |
| G | 4 | Aishah Anis | 5 ft 7 in (1.7 m) | So | Launceston Church | Launceston, Australia |
| G | 10 | Emmy Clarke | 5 ft 7 in (1.7 m) | Fr | Lake Ginninderra | Canberra, Australia |
| C | 13 | Ashley Banks | 6 ft 5 in (1.96 m) | Fr | Boise High School | Boise, ID |
| C | 15 | Lizzy Williamson | 6 ft 5 in (1.96 m) | RS Jr | Westminster School; Utah State | Adelaide, Australia |
| G | 22 | Daylani Ballena | 5 ft 8 in (1.73 m) | Jr | Kentridge High School | Kent, WA |
| G | 23 | Lexi Jensen | 5 ft 7 in (1.7 m) | Fr | Herriman High School | Riverton, UT |
| G | 32 | Cherita Daugherty | 5 ft 10 in (1.78 m) | GS | Prairie High School; Lower Columbia College | Vancouver, WA |
| G | 34 | Samantha Johnson | 6 ft 0 in (1.83 m) | Jr | Cedar High School | Cedar City, UT |
| F | 43 | Bryar Tronnier | 6 ft 2 in (1.88 m) | Sr | Centennial High School; Chandler-Gilbert Community College | Las Vegas, NV |

Head coach

- Tracy Sanders (Saint Mary's)

Assistant coach(es)

- Hailey Mandelko (Southern Utah)
- Jay Johnson (Saint Mary's)
- Morgan Bailey (BYU)

Legend

- (C) Team captain
- (S) Suspended
- (I) Ineligible
- (W) Walk-on
- Injured
- Current redshirt

Roster
Last update: July 17, 2024

== Schedule and results ==
| Date time, TV | Rank^{#} | Opponent^{#} | Result | Record | Site (attendance) city, state |
Non-conference regular season
| November 7, 2022*; 6:30 p.m., ESPN+ | | New Mexico | W 76–68 | 1–0 | America First Event Center (571); Cedar City, UT |
| November 9, 2022*; 6:30 p.m., ESPN+ | | Benedictine University (Mesa) | W 102–60 | 2–0 | America First Event Center (428); Cedar City, UT |
| November 12, 2022*; 5:00 p.m. | | at Gonzaga | L 38–91 | 2–1 | McCarthey Athletic Center (4,946); Spokane, WA |
| November 14, 2022*; 7:00 p.m., ESPN+ | | at Eastern Washington | L 60–62 | 2–2 | Reese Court (557); Cheney, WA |
| November 21, 2022*; 7:00 p.m. | | at No. 18 Oregon | L 54–66 | 2–3 | Matthew Knight Arena (6,128); Eugene, OR |
| November 26, 2022*; 12:00 p.m., ESPN+ | | UC Santa Barbara | L 96–102 ^{3OT} | 2–4 | America First Event Center (295); Cedar City, UT |
| December 1, 2022*; 12:00 p.m., ESPN+ | | Texas A&M–Commerce | W 71–56 | 3–4 | America First Event Center (977); Cedar City, UT |
| December 3, 2022*; 2:00 p.m., ESPN+ | | at Northern Arizona | L 65–76 | 3–5 | Rolle Activity Center (183); Flagstaff, AZ |
| December 7, 2022*; 6:00 p.m. | | at Colorado | L 48–78 | 3–6 | CU Events Center (573); Boulder, CO |
| December 17, 2022*; 6:30 p.m., ESPN+ | | La Sierra | W 77–44 | 4–6 | America First Event Center (241); Cedar City, UT |
| December 22, 2022*; 5:00 p.m., P12N | | at No. 12 Utah | L 56–90 | 4–7 | Huntsman Center (2,109); Salt Lake City, UT |
WAC regular season
| December 29, 2022; 6:30 p.m., ESPN+ | | Utah Tech | W 76–61 | 5–7 (1–0) | America First Event Center (656); Cedar City, UT |
| December 31, 2022; 1:00 p.m., ESPN+ | | at New Mexico State | W 61–58 | 6–7 (2–0) | Pan American Center (607); Las Cruces, NM |
| January 7, 2023; 3:00 p.m., ESPN+ | | at Seattle | W 75–62 | 7–7 (3–0) | Redhawk Center (526); Seattle, WA |
| January 11, 2023; 6:30 p.m., ESPN+ | | Utah Valley | W 70–66 | 8–7 (4–0) | America First Event Center (811); Cedar City, UT |
| January 14, 2023; 4:30 p.m., ESPN+ | | Sam Houston | W 60–55 | 9–7 (5–0) | America First Event Center (531); Cedar City, UT |
| January 19, 2023; 7:00 p.m., ESPN+ | | at Utah Tech | W 62–51 | 10–7 (6–0) | Burns Arena (1,171); St. George, UT |
| January 25, 2023; 6:00 p.m., ESPN+ | | at Grand Canyon | W 63–60 | 11–7 (7–0) | GCU Arena (508); Phoenix, AZ |
| January 28, 2023; 2:00 p.m., ESPN+ | | Tarleton | W 55–48 | 12–7 (8–0) | America First Event Center (556); Cedar City, UT |
| February 4, 2023; 1:00 p.m., ESPN+ | | at Texas–Rio Grande Valley | W 84–55 | 13–7 (9–0) | UTRGV Fieldhouse (811); Edinburg, TX |
| February 6, 2023; 12:00 p.m., ESPN+ | | at UT Arlington | L 58–60 | 13–8 (9–1) | College Park Center (251); Arlington, TX |
| February 9, 2023; 3:00 p.m., ESPN+ | | New Mexico State | W 63–56 | 14–8 (10–1) | America First Event Center (346); Cedar City, UT |
| February 11, 2023; 2:00 p.m., ESPN+ | | at Utah Valley | W 75–70 | 15–8 (11–1) | UCCU Center (481); Orem, UT |
| February 16, 2023; 6:30 p.m., ESPN+ | | Texas–Rio Grande Valley | W 73–66 | 16–8 (12–1) | America First Event Center (643); Cedar City, UT |
| February 18, 2023; 2:00 p.m., ESPN+ | | Stephen F. Austin | W 67–59 | 17–8 (13–1) | America First Event Center (584); Cedar City, UT |
| February 23, 2023; 5:00 p.m., ESPN+ | | at Abilene Christian | L 83–89 | 17–9 (13–2) | Moody Coliseum (895); Abilene, TX |
| February 25, 2023; 1:00 p.m., ESPN+ | | at Tarleton State | W 80–78 | 18–9 (14–2) | Wisdom Gym (1,322); Stephenville, TX |
| February 28, 2023; 6:30 p.m., ESPN+ | | California Baptist | W 83–75 | 19–9 (15–2) | America First Event Center (611); Cedar City, UT |
| March 2, 2023; 6:30 p.m., ESPN+ | | Grand Canyon | W 71–63 | 20–9 (16–2) | America First Event Center (680); Cedar City, UT |
WAC women's tournament
| March 8, 2023; 7:00 p.m., ESPN+ | (1) | vs. (7) New Mexico State; Quarterfinals | W 62–61 | 21–9 | Orleans Arena; Paradise, NV |
| March 10, 2023; 3:30 p.m., ESPN+ | (1) | vs. (3) Grand Canyon; Semifinals | W 64–51 | 22–9 | Orleans Arena (1,019); Paradise, NV |
| March 11, 2023; 4:30 p.m., ESPN2 | (1) | at (4) California Baptist; Championship game | W 82–73 | 23–9 | Orleans Arena (946); Paradise, NV |
NCAA women's tournament
| March 17, 2023*; 1:30 p.m., ESPN2 | (14 G1) | at (10) No. 3 G1 Notre Dame; First round | L 56–82 | 23–10 | Purcell Pavilion (3,950); Notre Dame, IN |
*Non-conference game. ^{#}Rankings from AP poll. (#) Tournament seedings in parentheses. G1=Greenville 1. All times are in Mountain.

== See also ==
- 2022–23 Southern Utah Thunderbirds men's basketball team
