= 2022–23 UNLV Lady Rebels basketball team =

American college basketball season

2022–23 UNLV Lady Rebels basketball

Mountain West Regular season and tournament champions

NCAA tournament, First Round
- Conference: Mountain West Conference

Ranking
- AP: No. 22
- Record: 31–3 (18–0 Mountain West)
- Head coach: Lindy La Rocque (3rd season)
- Assistant coaches: Roman Owen; Mia Bell; Karlie Burris
- Home arena: Cox Pavilion; Thomas & Mack Center

2022–23 Mountain West Conference women's basketball standings
	Conf.				Overall
Team	W		L	PCT	W		L	PCT
No. 22 UNLV†	18	–	0	1.000	31	–	3	.912
Wyoming	13	–	5	.722	23	–	11	.676
San Diego State	12	–	6	.667	23	–	11	.676
Colorado State	12	–	6	.667	20	–	12	.625
New Mexico	12	–	6	.667	21	–	12	.636
Boise State	11	–	7	.611	17	–	16	.515
Air Force	8	–	10	.444	13	–	18	.419
Nevada	6	–	12	.333	10	–	21	.323
Fresno State	3	–	15	.167	10	–	22	.313
San Jose State	3	–	15	.167	6	–	25	.194
Utah State	1	–	17	.056	4	–	26	.133
† 2023 MW Tournament winner As of March 21, 2023; Rankings from AP poll

The 2022–23 UNLV Lady Rebels basketball team represented the University of Nevada, Las Vegas during the 2022–23 NCAA Division I women's basketball season. The Lady Rebels are led by third-year head coach Lindy La Rocque. They played their home games at the Cox Pavilion, attached to the Thomas & Mack Center on UNLV's main campus in Paradise, Nevada. They are a member of the Mountain West Conference.

== Roster ==
2022–23 UNLV Lady Rebels women's basketball team
Players
Coaches

Pos.	#	Name	Height	Year	Previous school	Hometown
G	0	Ashley Scoggin	5 ft 7 in (1.7 m)	RS Sr	Westview; Nebraska	Dallas, OR
F	1	Nneka Obiazor	5 ft 10 in (1.78 m)	Jr	Eden Prairie HS; Youngstown State	Eden Prairie, MN
G	2	Kenadee Winfrey	5 ft 11 in (1.8 m)	So	Canyon HS	Canyon, TX
G	3	Kiara Jackson	5 ft 7 in (1.7 m)	So	South Grand Prairie HS	Grand Prairie, TX
G	10	Jasmyn Lott	5 ft 8 in (1.73 m)	Fr	Frisco Memorial HS	Frisco, TX
G	11	Justice Ethridge	5 ft 9 in (1.75 m)	Sr	Centennial HS	Las Vegas, NV
G	12	Alyssa Durazo-Frescas	5 ft 7 in (1.7 m)	So	Mater Dei HS	Newport Beach, CA
C	15	Keyana Wilfred	6 ft 3 in (1.91 m)	Sr	Mitchell HS	Mitchell, NE
C	23	Desi-Rae Young	6 ft 1 in (1.85 m)	Jr	Desert Oasis HS	Las Vegas, NV
G	24	Essence Booker	5 ft 8 in (1.73 m)	Jr	Spring Valley HS; Ball State	Las Vegas, NV
C	31	Erica Collins	6 ft 3 in (1.91 m)	Fr	Chino Hills HS	Chino Hills, CA
F	44	Alyssa Brown	6 ft 1 in (1.85 m)	So	Sahuaro HS	Tucson, AZ

Head coach

- Lindy La Rocque (Stanford)

Assistant coach(es)

- Roman Owen (Southwestern Christian)
- Mia Bell (UNLV)
- Karlie Burris (Portland)

Legend

- (C) Team captain
- (S) Suspended
- (I) Ineligible
- (W) Walk-on
- Injured
- Current redshirt

Roster

== Schedule ==
Date time, TV	Rank^{#}	Opponent^{#}	Result	Record	Site (attendance) city, state
Exhibition
November 2, 2022*; 6:30 p.m.		Chico State	W 114–53		Cox Pavilion (561); Paradise, NV
Non-conference regular season
November 7, 2022*; 5:15 p.m., KVVU 5.2		Pepperdine	W 80–58	1–0	Cox Pavilion (770); Paradise, NV
November 11, 2022*; 5:30 p.m., KVVU 5.2		Oral Roberts	W 100–84	2–0	Cox Pavilion (684); Paradise, NV
November 16, 2022*; 4:00 p.m., KVVU 5.2		Utah Valley	W 82–38	3–0	Cox Pavilion (569); Paradise, NV
November 20, 2022*; 2:00 p.m., KVVU 5.2		Cal State Bakersfield	W 74–42	4–0	Cox Pavilion (726); Paradise, NV
November 25, 2022*; 11:00 a.m.		Albany; UNLV Thanksgiving Tournament	W 78–55	5–0	Thomas & Mack Center (946); Paradise, NV
November 25, 2022*; 12:00 p.m.		George Washington; UNLV Thanksgiving Tournament	W 73–63	6–0	Thomas & Mack Center (925); Paradise, NV
November 27, 2022*; 4:00 p.m.		Illinois State; UNLV Thanksgiving Tournament	W 73–66	7–0	Cox Pavilion (729); Paradise, NV
December 3, 2022*; 2:00 p.m.		at Pacific	L 68–75	7–1	Alex G. Spanos Center (364); Stockton, CA
December 7, 2022*; 8:00 p.m.		at Hawaii–Hilo	W 77–74	8–1	Afook-Chinen Civic Auditorium (207); Hilo, HI
December 11, 2022*; 4:00 p.m., ESPN+		at Hawaii	W 76–66	9–1	Stan Sheriff Center; Honolulu, HI
December 18, 2022*; 1:00 p.m., ESPN+		at Oklahoma State	L 62–87	9–2	Gallagher-Iba Arena (2,682); Stillwater, OK
December 21, 2022*; 5:30 p.m., KVVU 5.2		Northern Arizona	W 93–73	10–2	Cox Pavilion (596); Paradise, NV
Mountain West regular season
December 29, 2022; 6:30 p.m., KVVU 5.2		Wyoming	W 73–67	11–2 (1–0)	Cox Pavilion (526); Paradise, NV
December 31, 2022; 3:30 p.m., KVVU 5.2		Colorado State	W 91–88 ^{OT}	12–2 (2–0)	Cox Pavilion (527); Paradise, NV
January 5, 2023; 6:00 p.m.		at Fresno State	W 64–49	13–2 (3–0)	Save Mart Center (1,711); Fresno, CA
January 7, 2023; 1:00 p.m.		at San Diego State	W 76–70	14–2 (4–0)	Viejas Arena (1,017); San Diego, CA
January 11, 2023; 6:00 p.m.		at San Jose State	W 84–58	15–2 (5–0)	Provident Credit Union Event Center (355); San Jose, CA
January 14, 2023; 6:00 p.m., FS1		New Mexico	W 79–63	16–2 (6–0)	Cox Pavilion (1,276); Paradise, NV
January 16, 2023; 8:00 p.m., CBSSN		Boise State	W 73–61	17–2 (7–0)	Cox Pavilion (1,001); Paradise, NV
January 19, 2023; 5:30 p.m.		at Wyoming	W 71–57	18–2 (8–0)	Arena-Auditorium (2,307); Laramie, WY
January 21, 2023; 12:00 p.m.		at Colorado State	W 63–58	19–2 (9–0)	Moby Arena (1,987); Fort Collins, CO
January 28, 2023; 2:00 p.m., KVVU 5.2		Nevada	W 80–57	20–2 (10–0)	Cox Pavilion (2,500); Paradise, NV
February 2, 2023; 6:00 p.m.		at New Mexico	W 93–75	21–2 (11–0)	The Pit (4,738); Albuquerque, NM
February 4, 2023; 12:00 p.m.		at Air Force	W 98–57	22–2 (12–0)	Clune Arena (770); Colorado Springs, CO
February 9, 2023; 5:00 p.m., KVVU 5.2		Fresno State	W 64–63	23–2 (13–0)	Cox Pavilion (770); Paradise, NV
February 11, 2023; 1:00 p.m.		at Boise State	W 76–63	24–2 (14–0)	ExtraMile Arena (1,363); Boise, ID
February 16, 2023; 6:30 p.m., KVVU 5.2	No. 23	San Jose State	W 77–60	25–2 (15–0)	Cox Pavilion (2,530); Paradise, NV
February 23, 2023; 6:30 p.m., KVVU 5.2	No. 24	Utah State	W 86–32	26–2 (16–0)	Cox Pavilion (1,070); Paradise, NV
February 25, 2023; 2:00 p.m., KVVU 5.2	No. 24	San Diego State	W 65–59	27–2 (17–0)	Cox Pavilion (2,993); Paradise, NV
February 28, 2023; 2:00 p.m.	No. 22	at Nevada	W 71–66	28–2 (18–0)	Lawlor Events Center (1,467); Reno, NV
Mountain West tournament
March 6, 2023; 12:00 p.m., Stadium	(1) No. 21	vs. (8) Nevada; Quarterfinals	W 84–47	29–2	Thomas & Mack Center; Paradise, NV
March 7, 2023; 5:00 p.m., Stadium	(1) No. 21	vs. (5) San Diego State; Semifinals	W 71–68	30–2	Thomas & Mack Center; Paradise, NV
March 8, 2023; 8:00 p.m., CBSSN	(1) No. 21	vs. (2) Wyoming; Championship game	W 71–60	31–2	Thomas & Mack Center; Paradise, NV
NCAA Women's Tournament
March 17, 2023*; 12:00 p.m., ESPN2	(11 G2) No. 22	vs. (6 G2) No. 18 Michigan; First round	L 59–71	31–3	Pete Maravich Assembly Center; Baton Rouge, LA
*Non-conference game. ^{#}Rankings from AP Poll. (#) Tournament seedings in parentheses. G2=Greenville 2. All times are in Pacific Time.

== Rankings ==
Ranking movements Legend: ██ Increase in ranking ██ Decrease in ranking — = Not ranked RV = Received votes т = Tied with team above or below
	Week																				
Poll	Pre	1	2	3	4	5	6	7	8	9	10	11	12	13	14	15	16	17	18	19	Final
AP	—	—*	—	—	—	—	—	—	—	—	—	—	RV	RV	RV	23	24	22	21	22	Not released
Coaches	—	—*	—^	—	—	—	—	—	—	—	—	RV	RV	RV	RV	25т	25	25	24	25	RV

*The preseason and week 1 polls were the same.
^Coaches did not release a week 2 poll.

== See also ==
- 2022–23 UNLV Runnin' Rebels basketball team
