= 2022–23 Utah Valley Wolverines women's basketball team =

Intercollegiate basketball season

2022–23 Utah Valley Wolverines women's basketball
- Conference: Western Athletic Conference
- Record: 6–24 (3–15 WAC)
- Head coach: Dan Nielson (4th season)
- Assistant coaches: Keilani Unga (4th season); Michael Shreeve (1st season); Xojian Harry (1st season)
- Home arena: UCCU Center (Capacity: 8,500); Lockhart Arena (Capacity: 2,000)

2022–23 WAC women's basketball standings
	Conf.				Overall
Team	W		L	PCT	W		L	PCT
Southern Utah†	16	–	2	.889	23	–	10	.697
Stephen F. Austin	15	–	3	.833	26	–	6	.813
California Baptist	13	–	5	.722	22	–	13	.629
Grand Canyon	12	–	6	.667	21	–	10	.677
Utah Tech*	10	–	8	.556	19	–	12	.613
New Mexico State	10	–	8	.556	18	–	17	.514
Abilene Christian	9	–	9	.500	15	–	15	.500
UT Arlington	8	–	10	.444	14	–	17	.452
Sam Houston	8	–	10	.444	13	–	17	.433
UT Rio Grande Valley	6	–	12	.333	12	–	18	.400
Seattle	5	–	13	.278	6	–	24	.200
Utah Valley	3	–	15	.167	6	–	24	.200
Tarleton*	2	–	16	.111	8	–	21	.276
† 2023 WAC tournament winner * Ineligible for the 2023 NCAA tournament due to transition from Division II; As of March 18, 2023

The 2022–23 Utah Valley Wolverines women's basketball team represented Utah Valley University in the 2022–23 NCAA Division I women's basketball season. Dan Nielson entered the season as head coach for his fourth year. The Wolverines played their home games at the UCCU Center and Lockhart Arena in Orem, Utah as members of the Western Athletic Conference (WAC).

The Wolverines finished the season 6–24, 3–15 in WAC play, to finish in twelfth place. In the WAC tournament, they lost to Utah Tech in the first round.

== Previous season ==
The Wolverines finished the 2021–22 season 16–15, 10–8 in WAC play, to finish in fourth place. In the 2022 WAC women's basketball tournament, they defeated Texas–Rio Grande Valley in the quarterfinals before losing to Stephen F. Austin in the semifinals.

== Offseason ==
=== Departures ===
Name	Position	Height	Year	Reason for departure
Maria Carvalho	G	5' 8"	Senior	Transferred to Utah State on March 28
Megan Jensen	F	6' 3"	Junior	Transferred to Southern Utah on March 30
Josie Williams	C	6' 5"	Senior	Transferred to Louisville on June 30
Madison Grange	G	5' 11"	Senior	Transferred to South Dakota on August 19

=== Incoming transfers ===
Name	Position	Height	Year	Previous school
Halle Nelson	G/F	6' 1"	Redshirt Sophomore	Utah State
Jaeden (Vaifanua) Brown	F	6' 1"	Sophomore	Wyoming

== Roster ==
2022–23 Utah Valley Wolverines women's basketball team
Players
Coaches

Pos.	#	Name	Height	Year	Previous school	Hometown
G	1	Kylee Mabry	5 ft 11 in (1.8 m)	Fr	Davis High School	Kaysville, UT
F	2	Elina Tausinga	5 ft 10 in (1.78 m)	So	East High School	Salt Lake City, UT
G	3	Kaylee Byon	5 ft 7 in (1.7 m)	Fr	Rosary Academy	Buena Park, CA
G	4	Abby Hendricks	5 ft 6 in (1.68 m)	Fr	La Costa Canyon High School	Carlsbad, CA
F	5	Shay Fano	6 ft 0 in (1.83 m)	Jr	Timpview High School	Spanish Fork, UT
G	10	Saige Gibb	5 ft 10 in (1.78 m)	RS Fr	Timpview High School	Raymond, AB
F	11	Kayla Anderson	5 ft 7 in (1.7 m)	Sr	Mountain View High School	Meridian, ID
G	12	Eleyana Tafisi	5 ft 6 in (1.68 m)	So	Copper Hills High School	West Jordan, UT
G	13	Ally Criddle	5 ft 8 in (1.73 m)	So	Skyridge High School	Lehi, UT
G	14	Abby Conlee	6 ft 0 in (1.83 m)	So	Lone Peak High School	Alpine, UT
G/F	20	Halle Nelson	6 ft 1 in (1.85 m)	RS So	American Fork High School	American Fork, UT
G	21	Tahlia White	6 ft 0 in (1.83 m)	RS So	Mountain View High School	Orem, UT
F	22	Hanna Roberts	6 ft 1 in (1.85 m)	Jr	Riverton High School	Riverton, UT
F	24	Jaeden Brown	6 ft 1 in (1.85 m)	So	Corner Canyon High School	Draper, UT
C	34	Tessa Chaney	6 ft 3 in (1.91 m)	Fr	Westlake High School	Saratoga Springs, UT
F	45	Mae Afoa	6 ft 1 in (1.85 m)	RS Fr	Jordan High School	Sandy, UT

Head coach

- Dan Nielson (BYU)

Assistant coach(es)

- Keilani Unga (BYU)
- Michael Shreeve (BYU)
- Xojian Harry (BYU)

Strength and conditioning coach(es)

- Josh Morzelewski (Utah)

Legend

- (C) Team captain
- (S) Suspended
- (I) Ineligible
- (W) Walk-on
- Injured
- Current redshirt

Roster
Last update: November 1, 2022

== Schedule and results ==
Date time, TV	Rank^{#}	Opponent^{#}	Result	Record	Site (attendance) city, state
Exhibition
October 29, 2022*; 2:00 p.m.		Fort Lewis	W 57–48	–	Lockhart Arena; Orem, UT
Non-conference season
November 7, 2022*; 6:00 p.m., ESPN+		Park University	W 59–54	1–0	UCCU Center (453); Orem, UT
November 11, 2022*; 1:30 p.m., P12N		at Utah	L 27–97	1–1	Jon M. Huntsman Center (1,483); Salt Lake City, UT
November 16, 2022*; 4:00 p.m., MW Network		at UNLV	L 38–82	1–2	Cox Pavilion (569); Las Vegas, NV
November 19, 2022*; 1:00 p.m., ESPN+		at Weber State	L 44–55	1–3	Dee Events Center (316); Ogden, UT
November 26, 2022*; 3:00 p.m., ESPN+		at Portland State	L 55–73	1–4	Viking Pavilion (291); Portland, OR
December 1, 2022*; 6:00 p.m., ESPN+		St. Thomas (Minnesota)	L 43–62	1–5	UCCU Center (281); Orem, UT
December 3, 2022*; 2:00 p.m., MW Network		at Utah State	L 55–65	1–6	Smith Spectrum (382); Logan, UT
December 7, 2022*; 6:00 p.m., ESPN+		Idaho State	L 48–64	1–7	UCCU Center (263); Orem, UT
December 10, 2022*; 2:00 p.m., ESPN+		Northwest Nazarene	W 76–72	2–7	UCCU Center (381); Orem, UT
December 17, 2022*; 2:00 p.m., MW Network		at Fresno State	L 48–53	2–8	Save Mart Center (806); Fresno, CA
December 21, 2022*; 2:00 p.m., ESPN+		Idaho	W 59–57	3–8	UCCU Center (231); Orem, UT
WAC conference season
December 29, 2022; 2:00 p.m., ESPN+		Grand Canyon	W 65–63 ^{2OT}	4–8 (1–0)	UCCU Center (301); Orem, UT
December 31, 2022; 2:00 p.m., ESPN+		at Utah Tech	L 58–68	4–9 (1–1)	Burns Arena (501); St. George, UT
January 4, 2023; 6:00 p.m., ESPN+		New Mexico State	L 57–63 ^{OT}	4–10 (1–2)	UCCU Center (367); Orem, UT
January 7, 2023; 2:00 p.m., ESPN+		California Baptist	L 61–69	4–11 (1–3)	UCCU Center (435); Orem, UT
January 11, 2023; 6:30 p.m., ESPN+		at Southern Utah	L 66–70	4–12 (1–4)	America First Event Center (811); Cedar City, UT
January 14, 2023; 2:00 p.m., ESPN+		Abilene Christian	L 50–71	4–13 (1–5)	UCCU Center (316); Orem, UT
January 19, 2023; 5:30 p.m., ESPN+		at Stephen F. Austin	L 46–72	4–14 (1–6)	William R. Johnson Coliseum (1,229); Nacogdoches, TX
January 21, 2023; 1:00 p.m., ESPN+		at Sam Houston	L 56–71	4–15 (1–7)	Bernard Johnson Coliseum (775); Huntsville, TX
January 26, 2023; 6:00 p.m., ESPN+		Seattle U	L 58–66	4–16 (1–7)	UCCU Center (481); Orem, UT
February 4, 2023; 1:00 p.m., ESPN+		at Tarleton	W 63–59 ^{OT}	5–16 (2–8)	Wisdom Gymnasium (763); Stephenville, TX
February 6, 2023; 1:00 p.m., ESPN+		at Abilene Christian	L 46–73	5–17 (2–9)	Moody Coliseum (331); Abilene, TX
February 9, 2023; 6:00 p.m., ESPN+		UT Arlington	W 64–53	6–17 (3–9)	UCCU Center (295); Orem, UT
February 11, 2023; 2:00 p.m., ESPN+		Southern Utah	L 70–75	6–18 (3–10)	UCCU Center (481); Orem, UT
February 16, 2023; 7:00 p.m., ESPN+		at California Baptist	L 52–90	6–19 (3–11)	CBU Events Center (397); Riverside, CA
February 23, 2023; 7:00 p.m., ESPN+		at Grand Canyon	L 53–63	6–20 (3–12)	GCU Arena (538); Phoenix, AZ
February 25, 2023; 2:00 p.m., ESPN+		at Seattle U	L 51–66	6–21 (3–13)	Redhawk Center (450); Seattle, WA
February 28, 2023; 6:00 p.m., ESPN+		UT Rio Grande Valley	L 59–69	6–22 (3–14)	UCCU Center (229); Orem, UT
March 2, 2023; 6:00 p.m., ESPN+		Utah Tech	L 59–71	6–23 (3–15)	UCCU Center (312); Orem, UT
WAC tournament
March 6, 2023; 1:00 p.m., ESPN+	(12)	vs. (5) Utah Tech	L 68–72	6–24	Orleans Arena (565); Paradise, NV
*Non-conference game. ^{#}Rankings from AP poll. (#) Tournament seedings in parentheses.

== See also ==
- 2022–23 Utah Valley Wolverines men's basketball team
