= 2022–23 Utah State Aggies women's basketball team =

American college basketball season

2022–23 Utah State Aggies women's basketball
- Conference: Mountain West Conference
- Record: 4–26 (1–17 MW)
- Head coach: Kayla Ard (3rd season)
- Assistant coaches: Ross James (1st season); Andre Gibbs (1st season); McKenzie Mangino (1st season)
- Home arena: Smith Spectrum

2022–23 Mountain West Conference women's basketball standings
	Conf.				Overall
Team	W		L	PCT	W		L	PCT
No. 22 UNLV†	18	–	0	1.000	31	–	3	.912
Wyoming	13	–	5	.722	23	–	11	.676
San Diego State	12	–	6	.667	23	–	11	.676
Colorado State	12	–	6	.667	20	–	12	.625
New Mexico	12	–	6	.667	21	–	12	.636
Boise State	11	–	7	.611	17	–	16	.515
Air Force	8	–	10	.444	13	–	18	.419
Nevada	6	–	12	.333	10	–	21	.323
Fresno State	3	–	15	.167	10	–	22	.313
San Jose State	3	–	15	.167	6	–	25	.194
Utah State	1	–	17	.056	4	–	26	.133
† 2023 MW Tournament winner As of March 21, 2023; Rankings from AP poll

The 2022–23 Utah State Aggies women's basketball team represented Utah State University during the 2022–23 NCAA Division I women's basketball season. The Aggies, who were led by third-year head coach Kayla Ard, played their home games at the Smith Spectrum in Logan, Utah, as members of the Mountain West Conference. They finished the season 4–26, 1–17 in Mountain West play, to finish in last (11th) place. They were defeated by Boise State in the first round of the Mountain West tournament.

== Previous season ==
The Aggies finished the 2021–22 season 11–19, 5–13 in Mountain West play, to finish in 9th place. After beating Fresno State in the first round, they were defeated by UNLV in the quarterfinals of the Mountain West tournament.

== Roster ==
2022–23 Utah State Aggies women's basketball team
Players
Coaches

Pos.	#	Name	Height	Year	Previous school	Hometown
F	0	Prima Chellis	5 ft 11 in (1.8 m)	GS	South Mountain Community College	Phoenix, AZ
G	1	Tamiah Robinson	5 ft 9 in (1.75 m)	Jr	Labette College	Philadelphia, PA
G	2	Isabella Tañedo	5 ft 5 in (1.65 m)	Fr	St. John's College High School	Laurel, MD
G	3	Maria Carvalho	5 ft 8 in (1.73 m)	GS	Utah Valley	Lisbon, Portugal
G	5	Kinley Falsev-Wickizer	5 ft 8 in (1.73 m)	Jr	Green Canyon High School	Benson, UT
G	10	Cristina Oliva	5 ft 9 in (1.75 m)	So	Sierra College	Davis, CA
F	12	Olivia Mason	6 ft 0 in (1.83 m)	Sr	Niagara	Kennett Square, PA
G	15	Olivia Wikstrom	6 ft 1 in (1.85 m)	Jr	Northern Colorado	Bainbridge Island, WA
F	20	Lillian Harris	6 ft 2 in (1.88 m)	So	CCBC Essex	Westminster, MD
G	21	Mayson Kimball	5 ft 11 in (1.8 m)	GS	Merrimack	Webster, NH
F	23	Tiairra Hill-Brown	6 ft 2 in (1.88 m)	Fr	Ed W. Clark High School	Stockton, CA
G	24	Natalia Fraley	6 ft 0 in (1.83 m)	Fr	Kelso High School	Kelso, WA
F	41	Abby Wahl	6 ft 1 in (1.85 m)	GS	Eastern Illinois	Santa Claus, IN
F	43	Ashya Klopfenstein	6 ft 1 in (1.85 m)	Sr	Dawson Community College	Howe, IN

Head coach

- Kayla Ard (Southeastern Louisiana)

Assistant coach(es)

- Ross James (Millsaps)
- Andre Gibbs (Philadelphia)
- McKenzie Mangino (Hawaiʻi–Hilo)

Legend

- (C) Team captain
- (S) Suspended
- (I) Ineligible
- (W) Walk-on
- Injured
- Current redshirt

Roster
Last update: March 5, 2023

== Schedule and results ==
Date time, TV	Rank^{#}	Opponent^{#}	Result	Record	Site (attendance) city, state
Exhibition
October 28, 2022*; 6:00 p.m.		Fort Lewis	W 74–45	–	Smith Spectrum (565); Logan, UT
Non-conference regular season
November 7, 2022*; 3:00 p.m.		College of Idaho	W 75–58	1–0	Smith Spectrum (282); Logan, UT
November 11, 2022*; 3:00 p.m.		Southeastern Louisiana	L 68–78	1–1	Smith Spectrum (381); Logan, UT
November 15, 2022*; 7:00 p.m., ESPN+		at Utah Tech	L 57–95	1–2	Burns Arena (–); St. George, UT
November 19, 2022*; 1:00 p.m., ESPN+		at Arkansas State	L 57–63	1–3	First National Bank Arena (1,146); Jonesboro, AR
November 23, 2022*; 2:00 p.m.		Ball State	L 55–80	1–4	Smith Spectrum (122); Logan, UT
November 26, 2022*; 2:00 p.m.		at USC	L 48–79	1–5	Galen Center (316); Los Angeles, CA
December 1, 2022*; 6:00 p.m., ESPN+		at Weber State	W 74–69	2–5	Dee Events Center (306); Ogden, UT
December 3, 2022*; 2:00 p.m., MW Network		Utah Valley	W 65–55	3–5	Smith Spectrum (382); Logan, UT
December 6, 2022*; 11:00 a.m., SCS Pacific		BYU	L 54–64	3–6	Smith Spectrum (2,713); Logan, UT
December 10, 2022*; 3:00 p.m.		at Loyola Marymount	L 63–71	3–7	Gersten Pavilion (178); Los Angeles, CA
December 20, 2022*; 2:00 p.m.		at Eastern Washington	L 54–84	3–8	Reese Court (227); Cheney, WA
Mountain West regular season
December 29, 2022; 6:30 p.m.		at Air Force	L 63–77	3–9 (0–1)	Clune Arena (375); Colorado Springs, CO
December 31, 2022; 5:00 p.m.		San Diego State	L 55–89	3–10 (0–2)	Smith Spectrum (317); Logan, UT
January 5, 2023; 6:00 p.m.		Colorado State	L 62–99	3–11 (0–3)	Smith Spectrum (215); Logan, UT
January 7, 2023; 2:00 p.m.		Boise State	L 56–73	3–12 (0–4)	Smith Spectrum (350); Logan, UT
January 14, 2023; 2:00 p.m.		at Nevada	L 58–78	3–13 (0–5)	Lawlor Events Center (971); Reno, NV
January 16, 2023; 5:30 p.m.		at Fresno State	W 68–58	4–13 (1–5)	Save Mart Center (1,747); Fresno, CA
January 19, 2023; 6:00 p.m.		Air Force	L 59–66	4–14 (1–6)	Smith Spectrum (286); Logan, UT
January 21, 2023; 3:00 p.m.		at San Jose State	L 59–77	4–15 (1–7)	Provident Credit Union Event Center (422); San Jose, CA
January 26, 2023; 6:00 p.m.		Wyoming	L 52–64	4–16 (1–8)	Smith Spectrum (312); Logan, UT
January 28, 2023; 2:00 p.m.		New Mexico	L 60–98	4–17 (1–9)	Smith Spectrum (362); Logan, UT
February 2, 2023; 11:00 a.m		at Colorado State	L 64–86	4–18 (1–10)	Moby Arena (6,257); Fort Collins, CO
February 4, 2023; Logan, UT		Nevada	L 63–68	4–19 (1–11)	Smith Spectrum (547); Logan, UT
February 9, 2023; 6:30 p.m.		Wyoming	L 48–70	4–20 (1–12)	Arena-Auditorium (2,227); Laramie, WY
February 16, 2023; 6:00 p.m.		Fresno State	L 61–76	4–21 (1–13)	Smith Spectrum (312); Logan, UT
February 18, 2023; 2:00 p.m.		at Boise State	L 41–89	4–22 (1–14)	ExtraMile Arena (1,413); Boise, ID
February 23, 2023; 7:30 p.m.		at No. #24 UNLV	L 32–86	4–23 (1–15)	Cox Pavilion (1,070); Las Vegas, NV
February 25, 2023; 2:00 p.m.		at New Mexico	L 55–111	4–24 (1–16)	The Pit (5,437); Albuquerque, NM
February 28, 2023; 6:00 p.m.		San Jose State	L 65–78	5–25 (1–17)	Smith Spectrum (428); Logan, UT
Mountain West tournament
March 5, 2023; 8:00 p.m.	(11)	vs. (6) Boise State; First Round	L 58–66	4–26	Thomas & Mack Center (7,157); Las Vegas, NV
*Non-conference game. ^{#}Rankings from AP poll. (#) Tournament seedings in parentheses. All times are in Mountain.

== See also ==
- 2022–23 Utah State Aggies men's basketball team
