= 2023 Women's National Invitation Tournament =

American collegiate basketball tournament

- Season: 2022–23
- Teams: 64
- Finals site: Allen Fieldhouse, Lawrence, Kansas
- Champions: Kansas (1st title)
- Runner-up: Columbia (1st title game)
- Semifinalists: Washington (2nd semifinal); Bowling Green (1st semifinal)
- Winning coach: Brandon Schneider (1st title)
- MVP: Taiyanna Jackson (Kansas)
- Attendance: 11,701
- Top scorer: Taiyanna Jackson (Kansas) (81 points)

The 2023 Women's National Invitation Tournament was a single-elimination tournament of 64 NCAA Division I women's college basketball teams that were not selected for the field of the 2023 Women's NCAA Tournament. The tournament committee announced the 64-team field on March 13, following the selection of the NCAA Tournament field. The tournament started March 15 and ended on April 1 with the championship game televised by CBSSN. Kansas won the tournament for the first time in program history.

This was the final WNIT to be held with a 64-team format. On July 17, 2023, WNIT operator Triple Crown Sports announced that the tournament would be reduced to 48 teams starting in 2024. This followed the NCAA's announcement that it would launch the Women's Basketball Invitation Tournament, a 32-team direct parallel to the men's National Invitation Tournament, starting in the 2023–24 season.

== Participants ==
The 2023 postseason WNIT field consists of 32 teams that received automatic berths – one berth from each conference – and 32 at-large teams. All Division I teams were considered for at-large berths, including those who are independent and/or are in the transition process of reaching full NCAA Division I status. Automatic berths went to the highest-finishing team in its conference's regular-season standings, not selected for an NCAA Tournament berth. The remaining team slots were filled by the top teams available.

=== Automatic qualifiers ===
Conference	School
America East	Albany
American	Memphis
Atlantic 10	UMass
ASUN	Liberty
ACC	Syracuse
Big 12	Kansas
Big East	Seton Hall
Big Sky	Northern Arizona
Big South	High Point
Big Ten	Nebraska
Big West	UC Irvine
Colonial	Towson
C-USA	Western Kentucky
Horizon	Green Bay
Ivy League	Columbia
MAAC	Niagara
MAC	Bowling Green
MEAC	Morgan State
Missouri Valley	Illinois State
Mountain West	Wyoming
Northeast	Fairleigh Dickinson
Ohio Valley	Little Rock
Pac-12	Washington
Patriot	Boston University
SEC	Arkansas
Southern	Wofford
Southland	Texas A&M - Corpus Christi
SWAC	Jackson State
Summit League	North Dakota State
Sun Belt	Texas State
WCC	San Francisco
WAC	Stephen F. Austin

=== At-large bids ===
School	Conference
Auburn	SEC
Ball State	MAC
Belmont	MVC
BYU	WCC
Clemson	ACC
Colorado State	MWC
Drexel	Colonial
Florida	SEC
Fordham	A-10
Harvard	Ivy
Kansas State	Big 12
Kent State	MAC
Long Beach State	Big West
Louisiana Tech	C-USA
Missouri	SEC
Missouri State	MVC
New Mexico	MWC
Northern Iowa	MVC
Oregon	Pac-12
Pennsylvania	Ivy
Rhode Island	A-10
Rice	C-USA
Richmond	A-10
St. Joseph's	A-10
San Diego State	MWC
San Diego	WCC
SMU	American
Texas Tech	Big 12
Tulane	American
UTEP	C-USA
Wake Forest	ACC
Wichita State	American

== Bracket ==
* – Denotes overtime period
(H) - Denotes home team

Round 1 March 15–17
(H)	Oregon	96
North Dakota State	57
(H)	BYU	67
Rice	71
(H)	San Diego State	45
UC Irvine	55
(H)	San Diego	75
Long Beach State	57
(H)	Wyoming	75
Texas A&M–CC	41
(H)	Kansas State	90
Wichita State	56
(H)	Washington	61
San Francisco	46
(H)	New Mexico	72
Northern Arizona	64

Round 2 March 19–21
(H)	Oregon	78
Rice	53
UC Irvine	48
(H)	San Diego	58
Wyoming	55
(H)	Kansas State	71
(H)	Washington	67
New Mexico	46

Super 16; March 23–24
(H)	Oregon	81
San Diego	61
Kansas State	48
(H)	Washington	55

Great 8 March 26
Oregon	59
(H)	Washington	63

Round 1 March 15–17
(H)	Nebraska	74
Missouri State	65
(H)	Northern Iowa	88
Colorado State	76
(H)	Missouri	61
Illinois State	51
(H)	Kansas	86
Western Kentucky	72
(H)	Stephen F. Austin	89
Texas State	79
(H)	Arkansas	69
Louisiana Tech	47
(H)	Texas Tech	67
UTEP	54
(H)	SMU	68
Little Rock	42

Round 2 March 19–21
(H)	Nebraska	77
Northern Iowa	57
Missouri	47
(H)	Kansas	75
Stephen F. Austin	37
(H)	Arkansas	60
(H)	Texas Tech	61
SMU	49

Super 16; March 23–24
Nebraska	55
(H)	Kansas	64
(H)	Arkansas	71
Texas Tech	66

Great 8 March 26
(H)	Kansas	78
Arkansas	64

Round 1 March 15–17
(H)	Rhode Island	46
Boston University	40
(H)	Richmond	75
Penn	52
(H)	UMass	73
Albany	48
(H)	Harvard	103
Towson	63
(H)	Syracuse	84
Kent State	56
(H)	Seton Hall	69
St. Joseph's	61
(H)	Fordham	73
Drexel	63
(H)	Columbia	69
Fairleigh Dickinson	53

Round 2 March 19–21
(H)	Rhode Island	74
Richmond	64
(H)	UMass	87
Harvard	89
Syracuse	72
(H)	Seton Hall	54
Fordham	73
(H)	Columbia	78

Super 16; March 23–24
Rhode Island	64
(H)	Harvard	74
Syracuse	82
(H)	Columbia	88

Great 8 March 26
Harvard	71
(H)	Columbia	77

Round 1 March 15–17
(H)	Bowling Green	87
Liberty	80
(H)	Green Bay	84
Niagara	52
(H)	Memphis	79
Jackson State	68
(H)	Ball State	101
Belmont	86
(H)	Florida	66
Wofford	63
(H)	Wake Forest	75
Morgan State	49
(H)	Auburn	73
Tulane	58
(H)	Clemson	66
High Point	46

Round 2 March 19–21
Bowling Green	69
(H)	Green Bay	51
(H)	Memphis	79
Ball State	62
Florida	80
(H)	Wake Forest	63
Auburn	55
(H)	Clemson	56

Super 16; March 23
(H)	Bowling Green	73
Memphis	60
Florida	73
(H)	Clemson	63

Great 8 March 27
(H)	Bowling Green	69
Florida	52

=== Semifinals and Championship Game ===
Semifinals; Fab 4 March 29
Washington	36
(H)	Kansas	61
Columbia	77
(H)	Bowling Green	70

Championship; April 1 CBSSN
(H)	Kansas	66
Columbia	59

== Game summaries ==
=== Fab 4 ===
ESPN3

March 29
6:00 pm EDT

Columbia 77, Bowling Green 70
Scoring by quarter: 23–19, 20–17, 14–16, 20–18
Pts: Hsu, 21; Rebs: Davis, 15; Asts: Davis, 7	Pts: Velasco, 19; Rebs: Fleming, 7 Asts: Velasco, 5

Stroh Center
Bowling Green, Ohio
Attendance: 4,155
Referees: Kevin Pethtel, Nykesha Thompson, Kalei Enterline

ESPN+

March 29
7:30 pm EDT

Washington 36, Kansas 61
Scoring by quarter: 10–15, 6–15, 12–18, 8–13
Pts: Daniels, 10; Rebs: Daniels, 13; Asts: Noble, 4	Pts: Franklin, 14; Rebs: Jackson, 11; Asts: Kersgieter, 2

Allen Fieldhouse
Lawrence, Kansas
Attendance: 7,229
Referees: Kim Hobbs, Brian Garland, Maggie Tieman

=== Championship ===
CBSSN

April 1
5:30 pm EDT

Columbia 59, Kansas 66
Scoring by quarter: 16–15, 12–16, 11–18, 20–17
Pts: Hsu, 19; Rebs: Henderson, 10; Asts: Henderson/Patrick, 3	Pts: Franklin, 19; Rebs: Jackson, 21; Asts: Franklin, 4

Allen Fieldhouse
Lawrence, Kansas
Attendance: 11,701
Referees: Natasha Camy, Karen Preato, Metta Christensen

== See also ==
- 2023 National Invitation Tournament
