= 2022–23 Colorado State Rams women's basketball team =

American college basketball season

2022–23 Colorado State Rams women's basketball

WNIT, first round
- Conference: Mountain West Conference
- Record: 20–12 (12-6 Mountain West)
- Head coach: Ryun Williams (11th season)
- Assistant coaches: Rico Burkett; Kyley Bachand; Amber Cunningham
- Home arena: Moby Arena

2022–23 Mountain West Conference women's basketball standings
	Conf.				Overall
Team	W		L	PCT	W		L	PCT
No. 22 UNLV†	18	–	0	1.000	31	–	3	.912
Wyoming	13	–	5	.722	23	–	11	.676
San Diego State	12	–	6	.667	23	–	11	.676
Colorado State	12	–	6	.667	20	–	12	.625
New Mexico	12	–	6	.667	21	–	12	.636
Boise State	11	–	7	.611	17	–	16	.515
Air Force	8	–	10	.444	13	–	18	.419
Nevada	6	–	12	.333	10	–	21	.323
Fresno State	3	–	15	.167	10	–	22	.313
San Jose State	3	–	15	.167	6	–	25	.194
Utah State	1	–	17	.056	4	–	26	.133
† 2023 MW Tournament winner As of March 21, 2023; Rankings from AP poll

The 2022–23 Colorado State Rams women's basketball team represented Colorado State University in the 2022–23 NCAA Division I women's basketball season. The Rams, led by eleventh-year head coach Ryun Williams, played their home games at Moby Arena in Fort Collins, Colorado, and were members of the Mountain West Conference. They finished the season 20–12, 12–6 in Mountain West play, to finish in third place in the conference. The Rams advanced to the semifinals of the Mountain West women's basketball tournament, beating six seed Boise State, before falling to two seed and foe, Wyoming. The Rams earned an invite to the 2023 Women's National Invitation Tournament, where they fell to Northern Iowa in the first round, and were without the assistance of multiple players due to injury.

== Roster ==
2022–23 Colorado State Rams women's basketball team
Players
Coaches

Pos.	#	Name	Height	Year	Previous school	Hometown
F	0	Kendyll Kinzer	6 ft 1 in (1.85 m)	Sr	Lewiston HS; Fresno State	Lewiston, ID
F	1	Kiya Dorroh	6 ft 1 in (1.85 m)	So	AZ Compass Prep; Missouri	Tucson, AZ
G	2	Destiny Thurman	5 ft 7 in (1.7 m)		Lamar HS; UTEP	Arlington, TX
F	3	Jess Moors	6 ft 0 in (1.83 m)	So	Westlake Girls HS	Auckland, New Zealand
G	4	McKenna Hofschild (C)	5 ft 2 in (1.57 m)	Sr	Prior Lake HS; Seton Hall	Prior Lake, MN
F	5	Jadyn Fife	6 ft 0 in (1.83 m)	Fr	Liberty Christian	North Richland Hills, TX
F	10	Joseana Vaz	6 ft 0 in (1.83 m)	Jr	N/A; Casper College	Praia, Cape Verde
G/F	11	Petra Farkas	5 ft 11 in (1.8 m)	Sr	Kecskemet TE; College of Southern Idaho	Kecskemét, Hungary
F	12	Clara Gomez	6 ft 1 in (1.85 m)	So	Segle XXI	Sabadell, Spain
G	14	Marta Leimane	6 ft 0 in (1.83 m)	Fr	Riga 47th Secondary	Ventspils, Latvia
F	21	Taylor Ray	6 ft 0 in (1.83 m)	Fr	Highlands Ranch HS	Highlands Ranch, CO
F	22	Cali Clark	6 ft 3 in (1.91 m)	Jr	Cherry Creek HS	Centennial, CO
G/F	24	Sydney Mech	6 ft 2 in (1.88 m)	RS Sr	Cherry Creek HS; Denver	Englewood, CO
G	30	Hannah Ronsiek	5 ft 11 in (1.8 m)	Fr	O'Gorman	Sioux Falls, SD
G	32	Cailyn Crocker	5 ft 9 in (1.75 m)	RS Jr	Mater Dei; California	Cypress, CA
F	55	Meghan Boyd (C)	5 ft 11 in (1.8 m)	Sr	Eagle HS; Denver	Eagle, ID

Head coach

- Ryun Williams (South Dakota)

Assistant coach(es)

- Rico Burkett (North Dakota)
- Kyley Bachand (Illinois)
- Amber Cunningham (South Dakota)

Legend

- (C) Team captain
- (S) Suspended
- (I) Ineligible
- (W) Walk-on
- Injured
- Current redshirt

Roster
Last update: November 1, 2024

== Statistics ==
Player	GP	GS	MPG	FG%	3FG%	FT%	RPG	APG	SPG	BPG	PPG
Kendyll Kinzer	30	13	16.6	.404	.306	.750	2.7	0.8	.2	.8	5.4
Kiya Dorroh	8	0	4.9	.529	.000	.50	1.3	0.0	0.0	0.0	2.4
Destiny Thurman	28	28	30.7	.441	.423	.898	4.8	1.8	1.5	.4	13.4
Jess Moors	0	0	0.0	.0	.0	.0	0.0	0.0	0.0	0.0	0.0
McKenna Hofschild	31	31	37.4	.488	.447	.792	3.5	7.2	1.1	.1	20.6
Jadyn Fife	0	0	0	.0	.0	.0	0	0	0	0.0	0
Joseana Vaz	24	2	13.4	.402	.182	.40	3.3	0.4	.6	.4	3.4
Petra Farkas	14	0	6.6	.278	.10	.0	0.9	.3	.5	.1	0.8
Clara Gomez	10	0	5.4	.250	.000	1.000	0.3	.3	.1	.0	.7
Marta Leimane	16	0	6.8	.514	.40	.889	0.4	0.5	.4	.0	3.0
Cali Clark	31	19	18.5	.564	.09	.593	6.1	0.6	.5	1.2	4.5
Sydney Mech	29	29	32.5	.418	.346	.857	2.9	0.8	.7	1.3	7.0
Hannah Ronsiek	32	3	12.4	.423	.418	.857	2.6	0.4	.8	.2	3.0
Cailyn Crocker	31	30	30.5	.456	.406	.796	3.6	1.5	.6	.1	10.6
Meghan Boyd	32	1	16.5	.380	.370	.842	1.7	0.6	.3	.1	6.4

== Schedule ==
Date time, TV	Rank^{#}	Opponent^{#}	Result	Record	Site (attendance) city, state
Exhibition
November 1, 2022*; 6:30 p.m.		Colorado Christian	W 78–47		Moby Arena (871); Fort Collins, CO
Non-conference regular season
November 8, 2022*; 6:00 p.m., MW Net		BYU	W 82–62	1–0	Moby Arena (1,142); Fort Collins, CO
November 11, 2022*; 5:00 p.m.		Montana	W 82–58	2–0	Moby Arena (2,113); Fort Collins, CO
November 15, 2022*; 6:30 p.m.		Western Colorado	W 86–56	3–0	Moby Arena (902); Fort Collins, CO
November 20, 2022*; 2:00 p.m., SECN+	No. RV	at Mississippi State	L 66–71	3–1	Humphrey Coliseum (4,678); Starkville, MS
November 25, 2022*; 9:00 p.m.		vs. Mercer; Las Vegas Invitational	W 79–51	4–1	The Mirage; Paradise, NV
November 26, 2022*; 4:30 p.m., FloSports		vs. Auburn; Las Vegas Invitational	L 73–74	4–2	The Mirage; Paradise, NV
November 30, 2022*; 6:00 p.m., ESPN+		at Northern Colorado	L 91–102 ^{3OT}	4–3	Bank of Colorado Arena (839); Greeley, CO
December 3, 2022*; 12:00 p.m.		Western Michigan	W 85–65	5–3	Moby Arena (1,059); Fort Collins, CO
December 6, 2022*; 6:30 p.m.		Denver	W 84–54	6–3	Moby Arena (898); Fort Collins, CO
December 10, 2022*; 1:00 p.m.		San Francisco	L 62–73	6–4	Moby Arena (893); Fort Collins, CO
December 19, 2022*; 6:30 p.m.		Regis	W 83–55	7–4	Moby Arena (962); Fort Collins, CO
Mountain West regular season
December 29, 2022; 6:30 p.m.		Fresno State	W 64–58	8–4 (1–0)	Moby Arena (1,111); Fort Collins, CO
December 31, 2022; 4:00 p.m.		at UNLV	L 88–91 ^{OT}	8–5 (1–1)	Cox Pavilion (527); Las Vegas, NV
January 5, 2023; 6:00 p.m.		at Utah State	W 99–62	9–5 (2–1)	Dee Glen Smith Spectrum (215); Logan, UT
January 7, 2023; 12:00 p.m.		New Mexico; State Pride Game	W 76–65	10–5 (3–1)	Moby Arena (1,373); Fort Collins, CO
January 11, 2023; 6:30 p.m.		at Boise State	W 71–50	11–5 (4–1)	ExtraMile Arena (787); Boise, ID
January 16, 2023; 6:30 p.m.		San Diego State	W 71–58	12–5 (5–1)	Moby Arena (1,164); Fort Collins, CO
January 19, 2023; 6:30 p.m.		Nevada; Orange Out	W 84–67	13–5 (6–1)	Moby Arena (1,082); Fort Collins, CO
January 21, 2023; 1:00 p.m.	No. RV	UNLV; Fight Like a Ram	L 58–63	13–6 (6–2)	Moby Arena (1,987); Fort Collins, CO
January 26, 2023; 7:00 p.m.		at New Mexico	L 59–64	13–7 (6–3)	The Pit (4,542); Albuquerque, NM
January 28, 2023; 1:00 p.m.		at Air Force	L 65–67	13–8 (6–4)	Clune Arena (542); Colorado Springs, CO
February 2, 2023; 11:00 a.m.		Utah State	W 86–64	14–8 (7–4)	Moby Arena (6,257); Fort Collins, CO
February 4, 2023; 1:00 p.m.		Wyoming; Pink Out	W 66–63	15–8 (8–4)	Moby Arena (2,141); Fort Collins, CO
February 9, 2023; 7:00 p.m.		at San Jose State	W 59–57	16–8 (9–4)	Provident Credit Union Event Center (274); San Jose, CA
February 11, 2023; 5:00 p.m.		at Fresno State	W 61–54	17–8 (10–4)	Save Mart Center (2,377); Fresno, CA
February 16, 2023; 7:00 p.m.		at San Diego State	L 49–53	17–9 (10–5)	Viejas Arena (620); San Diego, CA
February 18, 2023; 1:00 p.m.		Air Force	W 67–64	18–9 (11–5)	Moby Arena (2,614); Fort Collins, CO
February 25, 2023; 7:30 p.m., FS1		Wyoming	L 60–76	18–10 (11–6)	Arena-Auditorium (3,603); Laramie, WY
February 28, 2023; 6:30 p.m.		Boise State; Green Out	W 66–51	19–10 (12–6)	Moby Arena (1,518); Fort Collins, CO
Mountain West women's tournament
March 6, 2023; 8:30 p.m.	(3)	vs. (6) Boise State; Quarterfinals	W 59–52	20–10	Thomas & Mack Center (7,792); Paradise, NV
March 7, 2023; 8:30 p.m.	(3)	vs. (2) Wyoming; Semifinals	L 56–65	20–11	Thomas & Mack Center (7,769); Paradise, NV
WNIT
March 16, 2023*; 5:00 p.m., ESPN3		at Northern Iowa; First round	L 76–88	20–12	McLeod Arena (988); Cedar Falls, IA
*Non-conference game. ^{#}Rankings from AP poll. (#) Tournament seedings in parentheses. All times are in Mountain.
