= Alan Culpepper =

American long-distance runner

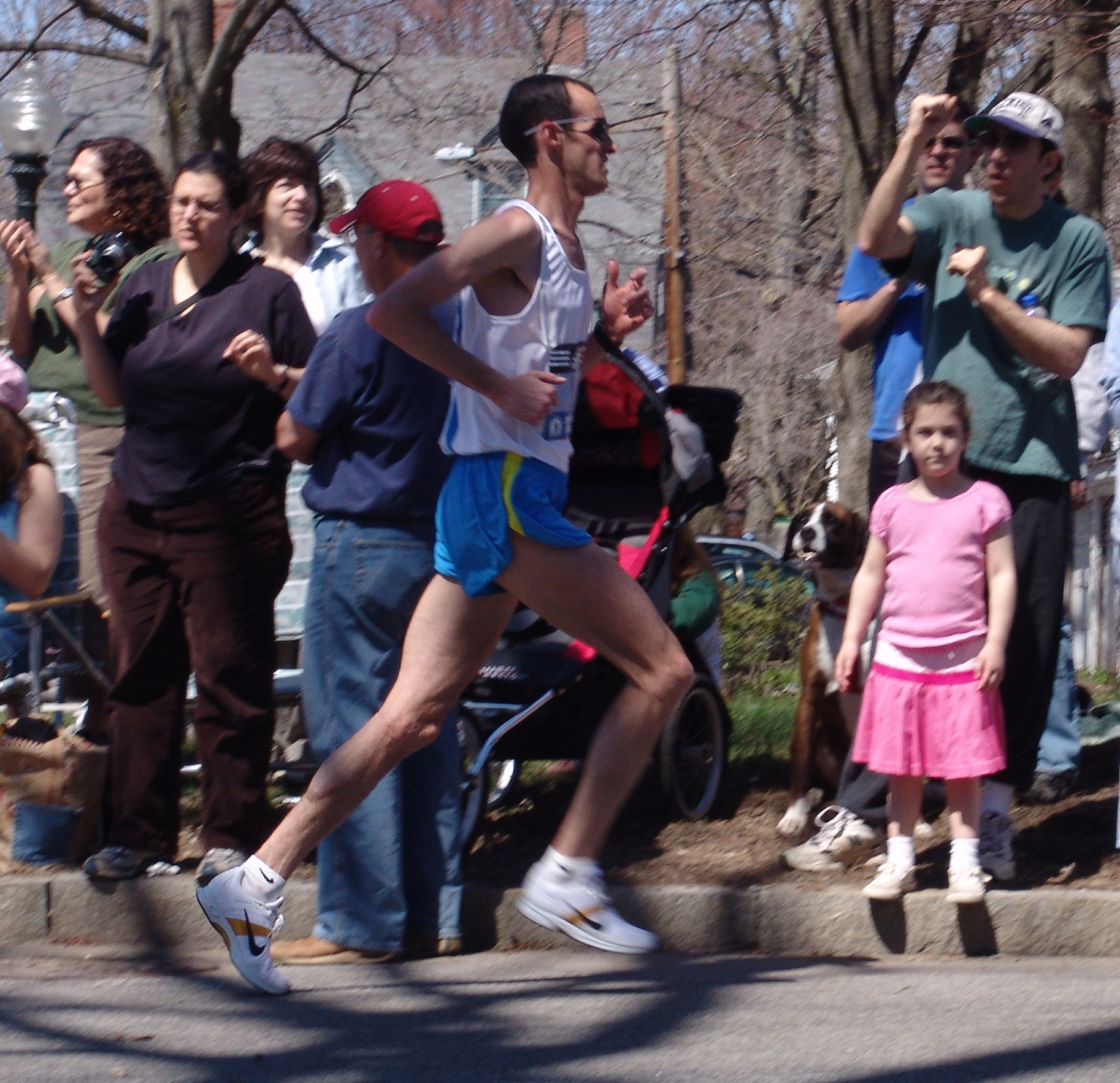
- Culpepper during the 2005 Boston Marathon

Personal information
- Full name: Alan Lawrence Culpepper
- Nationality: American
- Born: September 15, 1972 (age 53) Fort Worth, Texas
- Education: University of Colorado Boulder
- Height: 6 ft 1 in (185 cm)
- Spouse: Shayne Culpepper
- Children: 4

Sport
- Sport: Track, distance running
- Events: 5000 meters, 10,000 meters, marathon
- College team: Colorado

Achievements and titles
- Olympic finals: 2000; 10,000 m, 17th 2004 marathon, 12th
- World finals: 1999; 10,000 m, DNF; 2001; 10,000 m, 18th 2003; 10,000 m, 14th
- Personal bests: 1500 meters: 3:38.64; Mile: 3:55.12; 3000 meters: 7:47.30; 5000 meters: 13:25.75; 10,000 meters: 27:33.93; Marathon: 2:09:41
Medal record
Men’s athletics
NCAA Track and Field Championships
Gold medal – first place	1996 Eugene	5,000m

Alan Lawrence Culpepper (born September 15, 1972) is an American distance runner and two-time United States Olympian. He competed in the 2000 Summer Olympics in the 10,000 meters and in the 2004 Summer Olympics in the marathon. He also finished as the top American in the 2002 Chicago Marathon and 2005 Boston Marathon.

Along with competing on four World Championship teams, his accomplishments include finishing fourth in the Boston Marathon in 2005, winning the 2004 U.S. Olympic Trials Marathon and finishing 12th at the 2004 Olympic marathon in Athens. His 2:09:41 at the 2002 Chicago Marathon tied him with Alberto Salazar for the fastest ever debut marathon by an American, and remains his fastest marathon. Culpepper has won three U.S. Cross Country titles and three track titles (two at 10,000 m and one at 5,000 m). His personal bests include 3:55.1 for the mile, 13:25 for 5k and 27:33 in the 10k.

== Running career ==
=== High school and collegiate ===
Culpepper graduated in 1991 from Coronado High School in El Paso, Texas. In 1989 and 1990, he won five Texas state titles in cross country and track, but did not compete in his final season (1991).

He went on to attend the University of Colorado in Boulder, Colorado, where he developed into a national-class runner. In 1996 he won the NCAA outdoor 5,000 m title and placed 10th at the Olympic Trials in that event; the following year he improved to 2nd at the USATF Nationals (behind Bob Kennedy) and represented the USA at the 1997 World Championships.

=== Professional ===
Following graduation from CU, Culpepper continued to live and train near Boulder. In 1999, he won his first open national title, the USA Cross Country Championships. That spring he also won the 10,000 m at the USATF Outdoor Championships and ran that event at the 1999 World Championships. In 2000, he took second in the 10,000 m at the U.S. Olympic Trials, overtaking champion Mebrahtom Keflezighi in the final lap but not quite managing to pass him by the finish line.

Culpepper represented the U.S. at 10,000 m at the 2001 World Championships as well. He won another U.S. track championship in 2002 when he took the 5,000 m title. That fall, in his debut marathon in Chicago, he ran 2:09:41. In 2003, he won the U.S. 10,000 m title.

After taking 2003 off from marathons, Culpepper ran his second at the U.S. Olympic Trials in Birmingham, Alabama. Renewing his long-time rivalry with Keflezighi, Culpepper bested "Meb" in 2:11:42, with the lead changing several times in the final miles. Culpepper then placed 12th at the Athens Olympic Marathon, which would have been the best performance by an American marathoner in several Olympics had Keflezighi not won the silver medal.

In 2005, Culpepper ran a 13:25.75 personal best in the 5,000 meter run at the 2005 Norwich Union British Grand Prix in London, England. He ran 2:11:02 to take fifth in the 2006 Boston Marathon.

At the 2007 US Cross-Country Championships, Culpepper won his third cross country title, finishing first in the 12,000 m with a time of 37:09. (This race is featured in the documentary, SHOWDOWN – Five Elite Distance Runners, One Dream.)

== Personal life ==
Culpepper married American distance runner Shayne Culpepper (née Wille), also a University of Colorado graduate, in 1997. They have four sons, Cruz (b. April 2002), Levi (b. June 2006), Rocco (b. May 2008), and Chase (b. Feb 2012).

He is now a Dean and cross country coach at Erie High School in Colorado.

== Recent news ==
On February 10, 2007, Alan won the Open Men's 12K at the 2007 USA Cross Country Championships in Boulder, Colorado. He finished the race, held at Flatirons Golf Course, in a time of 37:09. It was Culpepper's third USA Cross Country victory; he also won in 1999 and 2003.

On June 8, 2008 Culpepper won the Rocky Mountain Half Marathon in Denver, Colorado. He crossed the finish line with a time of 1:07:57.

Alan assumed the head cross country coach position at Fairview High School in Boulder, Colorado for the 2019 season.

Alan assumed the head cross country coach position at Erie High School in Erie, Colorado for the 2023 season

== Achievements ==
Year	Competition	Venue	Position	Event	Notes
Representing the United States
2002	Chicago Marathon	Chicago, United States	6th	Marathon	2:09:41
2004	Olympic Games	Athens, Greece	12th	Marathon	2:15:26
