= 2023 Mountain West Conference women's basketball tournament =

- Classification: Division I
- Season: 2022–23
- Teams: 11
- Site: Thomas & Mack Center; Paradise, NV
- Champions: UNLV (2nd title)
- Winning coach: Lindy La Rocque (2nd title)
- Television: Stadium, CBSSN

2022–23 Mountain West Conference women's basketball standings
	Conf.				Overall
Team	W		L	PCT	W		L	PCT
No. 22 UNLV†	18	–	0	1.000	31	–	3	.912
Wyoming	13	–	5	.722	23	–	11	.676
San Diego State	12	–	6	.667	23	–	11	.676
Colorado State	12	–	6	.667	20	–	12	.625
New Mexico	12	–	6	.667	21	–	12	.636
Boise State	11	–	7	.611	17	–	16	.515
Air Force	8	–	10	.444	13	–	18	.419
Nevada	6	–	12	.333	10	–	21	.323
Fresno State	3	–	15	.167	10	–	22	.313
San Jose State	3	–	15	.167	6	–	25	.194
Utah State	1	–	17	.056	4	–	26	.133
† 2023 MW Tournament winner As of March 21, 2023; Rankings from AP poll

The 2023 Mountain West Conference women's basketball tournament was held between March 5–8, 2023, at the Thomas & Mack Center on the campus of University of Nevada, Las Vegas, in Las Vegas, Nevada.

== Seeds ==
Teams are seeded by conference record, with a ties broken by record between the tied teams followed by record against the regular-season champion, if necessary.

Seed	School	Conf	Tiebreaker
1	UNLV	18-0	
2	Wyoming	13–5	
3	Colorado State	12-6	2-2 vs. New Mexico & San Diego State; 0-2 vs. UNLV; 1-1 vs. Wyoming; 2-0 vs. Boise State
4	New Mexico	12-6	2-2 vs. Colorado State & and San Diego State; 0-2 vs. UNLV; 1-1 vs. Wyoming; 1-1 vs. Boise State; 2-0 vs. Air Force
5	San Diego State	12-6	2-2 vs. Colorado State & and New Mexico; 0-2 vs. UNLV; 1-1 vs. Wyoming; 1-1 vs. Boise State; 1-0 vs. Air Force
6	Boise State	11-7	
7	Air Force	8-10	
8	Nevada	6-12	
9	Fresno State	3-15	1-1 vs. San Jose State; 0-2 vs. UNLV; 0-1 vs. Wyoming
10	San Jose State	3-15	1-1 vs. Fresno State; 0-2 vs. UNLV; 0-2 vs. Wyoming
11	Utah State	1-17	

== Schedule ==
Session	Game	Time*	Matchup^{#}	Score	Television	Attendance
First Round – Sunday, March 5
1	1	2:00 PM	No. 8 Nevada vs. No. 9 Fresno State	65–53**	Stadium	
1	2	4:30 PM	No. 7 Air Force vs. No. 10 San Jose State	51–62	Stadium	
1	3	7:00 PM	No. 6 Boise State vs. No. 11 Utah State	66–58	Stadium	
Quarterfinals – Monday, March 6
2	4	12:00 PM	No. 1 UNLV vs. No. 8 Nevada	84–47	Stadium	
2	5	2:30 PM	No. 4 New Mexico vs. No. 5 San Diego State	68–69	Stadium	
3	6	5:30 PM	No. 2 Wyoming vs. No. 10 San Jose State	72-57	Stadium	
3	7	8:00 PM	No. 3 Colorado State vs. No. 6 Boise State	59-52	Stadium	
Semifinals – Tuesday, March 7
4	8	6:00 PM	No. 1 UNLV vs. No. 5 San Diego State	71-68	Stadium	
4	9	8:30 PM	No. 2 Wyoming vs. No. 3 Colorado State	65-56	Stadium	
Championship Game – Wednesday, March 8
5	10	8:00 PM	No. 1 UNLV vs. No. 2 Wyoming	71-60	CBSSN	
*Game Times in PT. ** denotes overtime.

== Bracket ==
First round Sunday, March 5
8	Nevada	65*
9	Fresno State	53
7	Air Force	51
10	San Jose State	62
6	Boise State	66
11	Utah State	58

Quarterfinals; Monday, March 6
1	UNLV	84
8	Nevada	47
4	New Mexico	68
5	San Diego State	69
2	Wyoming	72
10	San Jose State	57
3	Colorado State	59
6	Boise State	52

Semifinals; Tuesday, March 7
1	UNLV	71
5	San Diego State	68
2	Wyoming	65
3	Colorado State	56

Championship; Wednesday, March 8
1	UNLV	71
2	Wyoming	60

* denotes overtime period

== See also ==
- 2023 Mountain West Conference men's basketball tournament
