= 2022–23 Northern Iowa Panthers women's basketball team =

American college basketball season

2022–23 Northern Iowa Panthers women's basketball

WNIT, second round
- Conference: Missouri Valley Conference
- Record: 23–10 (16–4 MVC)
- Head coach: Tanya Warren (16th season)
- Associate head coach: Brad Nelson
- Assistant coaches: Nate Oakland; Katelin Oney
- Home arena: McLeod Center

2022–23 Missouri Valley Conference women's basketball standings
| | Conf. | | | | Overall |
| Team | W | | L | PCT | W | | L | PCT |
|---|---|---|---|---|---|---|---|---|
| Illinois State | 17 | – | 3 | .850 | 24 | – | 9 | .727 |
| Belmont | 17 | – | 3 | .850 | 23 | – | 12 | .657 |
| Northern Iowa | 16 | – | 4 | .800 | 23 | – | 10 | .697 |
| Missouri State | 14 | – | 6 | .700 | 20 | – | 12 | .625 |
| Drake† | 14 | – | 6 | .700 | 22 | – | 9 | .710 |
| UIC | 9 | – | 11 | .450 | 19 | – | 17 | .528 |
| Southern Illinois | 8 | – | 12 | .400 | 12 | – | 19 | .387 |
| Murray State | 7 | – | 13 | .350 | 15 | – | 16 | .484 |
| Evansville | 6 | – | 14 | .300 | 11 | – | 19 | .367 |
| Indiana State | 6 | – | 14 | .300 | 11 | – | 19 | .367 |
| Valparaiso | 5 | – | 15 | .250 | 7 | – | 23 | .233 |
| Bradley | 1 | – | 19 | .050 | 4 | – | 28 | .125 |
† 2023 MVC tournament winner As of March 19, 2023

The 2022–23 Northern Iowa Panthers women's basketball team represented the University of Northern Iowa during the 2022–23 NCAA Division I women's basketball season. The Panthers were led by head coach Tanya Warren in her sixteenth season, and played their home games at the McLeod Center in Cedar Falls, Iowa as a member of the Missouri Valley Conference (MVC).

The Panthers finished the season 23–10, 16–4 in MVC play, to finish in third place. In the MVC tournament, they defeated UIC in the quarterfinals before falling to Belmont in the semifinals. They received an at-large bid into the WNIT, where they defeated Colorado State in the first round, before falling to Nebraska in the second round.

== Previous season ==
The Panthers finished the 2021–22 season with a 23–11 record, including 13–5 in Missouri Valley Conference play. They received a bid to the 2022 Women's National Invitation Tournament, where they advanced to the second round, in which they were defeated by Drake.

== Offseason ==
=== Departures ===
| Name | Number | Pos. | Height | Year | Hometown | Reason for departure |
|---|---|---|---|---|---|---|
| Anaya Barney | 1 | G | 5' 11" | Freshman | Cedar Falls, IA | Transferred to Coastal Carolina |
| Karli Rucker | 3 | G | 5' 6" | Senior | Eldridge, IA | Graduated |
| Nicole Kroeger | 5 | G | 5' 9" | Senior | Palmyra, MO | Graduated |
| Bre Gunnels | 11 | F | 6' 1" | Senior | Kansas City, MO | Graduated |
| Taryn McKee | 21 | C | 6' 3" | Freshman | Keosauqua, IA | Personal reasons |
| Sara McCullough | 25 | F | 6' 0" | Redshirt Freshman | Ankeny, IA | Personal reasons |
| Kiana Barney | 33 | F | 6' 1" | Redshirt Junior | Cedar Falls, IA | Graduated |

=== Incoming transfers ===
| Name | Number | Pos. | Height | Year | Hometown | Previous school |
|---|---|---|---|---|---|---|
| Ellie Foster | 3 | G | 5' 11" | Redshirt Freshman | Dike, IA | Green Bay |
| Rachael Heittola | 32 | C | 6' 3" | Junior | Belleville, WI | Bemidji State |

== Roster ==
2022–23 Northern Iowa Panthers women's basketball team
Players
Coaches

| Pos. | # | Name | Height | Year | Previous school | Hometown |
|---|---|---|---|---|---|---|
| G | 0 | Maya McDermott | 5 ft 6 in (1.68 m) | So | Johnston | Johnston, IA |
| G | 2 | Cailyn Morgan | 5 ft 10 in (1.78 m) | Jr | Iowa City West | Coralville, IA |
| G | 3 | Ellie Foster | 5 ft 11 in (1.8 m) | RS Fr | Dike-New Hartford | Dike, IA |
| G | 4 | Emerson Green | 5 ft 10 in (1.78 m) | So | Cedar Falls | Cedar Falls, IA |
| F | 5 | Ryley Goebel | 5 ft 11 in (1.8 m) | Fr | Center Point-Urbana | Center Point, IA |
| G | 12 | Kam Finley | 5 ft 9 in (1.75 m) | Sr | Cedar Falls | Cedar Falls, IA |
| G | 14 | Riley Wright | 5 ft 11 in (1.8 m) | RS Fr | Marion | Marion, IA |
| G | 22 | Taryn Wharton | 5 ft 5 in (1.65 m) | Fr | Bellevue West | Bellevue, NE |
| G | 24 | Kayba Laube | 5 ft 9 in (1.75 m) | So | Marion | Marion, IA |
| C | 30 | Cynthia Wolf | 6 ft 3 in (1.91 m) | Sr | Cedar Falls | Cedar Falls, IA |
| C | 32 | Rachael Heittola | 6 ft 3 in (1.91 m) | Jr | Belleville | Belleville, WI |
| F | 42 | Grace Boffeli | 6 ft 1 in (1.85 m) | So | North Scott | Eldridge, IA |

Head coach

- Tanya Warren (Creighton)

Assistant coach(es)

- Brad Nelson (Oregon)
- Nate Oakland (Northern Iowa)
- Katelin Oney (Northern Iowa)

Legend

- (C) Team captain
- (S) Suspended
- (I) Ineligible
- (W) Walk-on
- Injured
- Current redshirt

Roster
Last update: March 20, 2023

== Schedule and results ==
| Date time, TV | Rank^{#} | Opponent^{#} | Result | Record | High points | High rebounds | High assists | Site (attendance) city, state |
Exhibition
| November 1, 2022*; 6:00 p.m. | | Cornell | W 97–46 | – | 18 – Boffeli | 11 – Boffeli | 5 – McDermott | McLeod Center (1,832); Cedar Falls, IA |
Non-conference regular season
| November 7, 2022*; 5:00 p.m., ESPN3 | | St. Thomas (MN) | W 58–46 | 1–0 | 19 – Boffeli | 10 – Boffeli | 2 – McDermott | McLeod Center (1,652); Cedar Falls, IA |
| November 13, 2022*; 2:00 p.m., ESPN+ | | Saint Louis | W 84–64 | 2–0 | 23 – McDermott | 12 – Boffeli | 5 – Boffeli | McLeod Center (1,966); Cedar Falls, IA |
| November 16, 2022*; 6:00 p.m., ESPN+ | | No. 7 Iowa State | L 85–88 | 2–1 | 26 – Boffeli | 7 – Boffeli | 3 – McDermott | McLeod Center (2,744); Cedar Falls, IA |
| November 20, 2022*; 2:00 p.m., ESPN+ | | No. 20 Creighton | L 66–85 | 2–2 | 14 – McDermott | 8 – Goebel | 2 – McDermott | McLeod Center (2,110); Cedar Falls, IA |
| November 24, 2022*; 8:00 p.m., FloHoops | | vs. Tulane; Cancun Challenge | W 82–60 | 3–2 | 20 – McDermott | 13 – Wolf | 5 – Wolf | Hard Rock Hotel Riviera Maya (89); Puerto Aventuras, Mexico |
| November 25, 2022*; 5:30 p.m., FloHoops | | vs. Vanderbilt; Cancun Challenge | W 65–62 | 4–2 | 15 – Boffeli | 10 – Wolf | 4 – Green | Hard Rock Hotel Riviera Maya (125); Puerto Aventuras, Mexico |
| December 3, 2022*; 7:00 p.m., GoJacks.com | | at South Dakota State | L 69–80 | 4–3 | 17 – Green | 5 – Wolf | 3 – McDermott | Frost Arena (1,859); Brookings, SD |
| December 6, 2022*; 5:00 p.m., ESPN+ | | North Dakota State | W 79–70 | 5–3 | 17 – Boffeli | 8 – Boffeli | 3 – McDermott | McLeod Center (1,852); Cedar Falls, IA |
| December 18, 2022*; 2:00 p.m., B1G+ | | at No. 12 Iowa | L 74–88 | 5–4 | 16 – Boffeli | 8 – Wolf | 3 – McDermott | Carver-Hawkeye Arena (13,394); Iowa City, IA |
Missouri Valley Conference regular season
| December 30, 2022; 7:00 p.m., ESPN3 | | at Bradley | W 83–64 | 6–4 (1–0) | 17 – Boffeli | 7 – Boffeli | 6 – McDermott | Renaissance Coliseum (400); Peoria, IL |
| January 1, 2023; 2:00 p.m., ESPN+ | | at Illinois State | W 74–64 | 7–4 (2–0) | 25 – Boffeli | 12 – Boffeli | 9 – McDermott | Redbird Arena (1,035); Normal, IL |
| January 6, 2023; 6:00 p.m., ESPN3 | | Murray State | W 81–54 | 8–4 (3–0) | 21 – Boffeli | 14 – Boffeli | 4 – McDermott | McLeod Center (1,814); Cedar Falls, IA |
| January 8, 2023; 2:00 p.m., ESPN+ | | Belmont | L 61–67 | 8–5 (3–1) | 14 – McDermott | 9 – Wolf | 3 – McDermott | McLeod Center (2,110); Cedar Falls, IA |
| January 11, 2023; 6:00 p.m., ESPN+ | | at Drake | W 70–69 | 9–5 (4–1) | 19 – McDermott | 11 – Boffeli | 6 – McDermott | Knapp Center (2,563); Des Moines, IA |
| January 15, 2023; 1:00 p.m., ESPN+ | | at Evansville | W 73–68 | 10–5 (5–1) | 17 – Boffeli | 10 – Boffeli | 4 – Wolf | Meeks Family Fieldhouse (382); Evansville, IN |
| January 19, 2023; 6:00 p.m., ESPN+ | | Valparaiso | W 89–58 | 11–5 (6–1) | 18 – Boffeli | 8 – Wolf | 3 – McDermott | McLeod Center (1,889); Cedar Falls, IA |
| January 21, 2023; 2:00 p.m., ESPN+ | | UIC | W 79–44 | 12–5 (7–1) | 12 – McDermott | 8 – Boffeli | 3 – Wharton | McLeod Center (1,966); Cedar Falls, IA |
| January 26, 2023; 6:00 p.m., ESPN+ | | at Missouri State | L 67–71 | 12–6 (7–2) | 17 – McDermott | 7 – Boffeli | 3 – McDermott | Great Southern Bank Arena (1,976); Springfield, MO |
| January 28, 2023; 2:00 p.m., ESPN+ | | at Southern Illinois | W 94–81 | 13–6 (8–2) | 26 – Green | 10 – Boffeli | 5 – Boffeli | Banterra Center (475); Carbondale, IL |
| February 1, 2023; 6:00 p.m., ESPN+ | | Drake | W 49–47 | 14–6 (9–2) | 12 – McDermott | 11 – Boffeli | 3 – McDermott | McLeod Center (2,757); Cedar Falls, IA |
| February 5, 2023; 2:00 p.m., ESPN+ | | Indiana State | W 91–51 | 15–6 (10–2) | 23 – Boffeli | 8 – Boffeli | 5 – Wharton | McLeod Center (2,278); Cedar Falls, IA |
| February 10, 2023; 7:00 p.m., ESPN3 | | at UIC | W 55–47 | 16–6 (11–2) | 20 – Boffeli | 9 – Boffeli | 5 – McDermott | Credit Union 1 Arena (923); Chicago, IL |
| February 12, 2023; 1:00 p.m., ESPN+ | | at Valparaiso | W 83–60 | 17–6 (12–2) | 19 – McDermott | 11 – Boffeli | 7 – McDermott | Athletics-Recreation Center (321); Valparaiso, IN |
| February 16, 2023; 6:00 p.m., ESPN+ | | Illinois State | L 70–72 | 17–7 (12–3) | 17 – McDermott | 10 – Boffeli | 3 – McDermott | McLeod Center (2,020); Cedar Falls, IA |
| February 18, 2023; 2:00 p.m., ESPN+ | | Bradley | W 76–50 | 18–7 (13–3) | 17 – Boffeli | 7 – Boffeli | 5 – McDermott | McLeod Center (2,086); Cedar Falls, IA |
| February 23, 2023; 6:30 p.m., ESPN+ | | at Belmont | L 77–82 | 18–8 (13–4) | 19 – Boffeli | 11 – Boffeli | 3 – McDermott | Curb Event Center (771); Nashville, TN |
| February 25, 2023; 2:00 p.m., ESPN+ | | at Murray State | W 76–46 | 19–8 (14–4) | 18 – Boffeli | 11 – Boffeli | 3 – McDermott | CFSB Center (1,314); Murray, KY |
| March 2, 2023; 6:00 p.m., ESPN+ | | Southern Illinois | W 85–76 | 20–8 (15–4) | 21 – Boffeli | 11 – Boffeli | 4 – McDermott | McLeod Center (1,913); Cedar Falls, IA |
| March 4, 2023; 2:00 p.m., ESPN3 | | Missouri State | W 86–67 | 21–8 (16–4) | 24 – Green | 9 – Green | 3 – Green | McLeod Center (2,351); Cedar Falls, IA |
MVC tournament
| March 10, 2023; 8:30 p.m., ESPN+ | (3) | vs. (6) UIC; Quarterfinals | W 73–57 | 22–8 | 23 – Boffeli | 8 – Boffeli | 3 – Heittola | Vibrant Arena at The MARK (1,341); Moline, IL |
| March 11, 2023; 4:00 p.m., ESPN+ | (3) | vs. (2) Belmont; Semifinals | L 62–69 | 22–9 | 15 – McDermott | 13 – Boffeli | 7 – McDermott | Vibrant Arena at The MARK (2,005); Moline, IL |
Women's National Invitation Tournament
| March 16, 2023; 6:00 p.m., ESPN3 | | Colorado State; First round | W 88–76 | 23–9 | 21 – McDermott | 15 – Boffeli | 5 – McDermott | McLeod Center (988); Cedar Falls, IA |
| March 19, 2023; 2:00 p.m., B1G+ | | at Nebraska; Second round | L 57–77 | 23–10 | 19 – McDermott | 9 – Boffeli | 2 – McDermott | Pinnacle Bank Arena (6,478); Lincoln, NE |
*Non-conference game. ^{#}Rankings from AP poll. (#) Tournament seedings in parentheses. All times are in Central.
