= Karen Logan =

American basketball player

Personal information
- Born: 1949 (age 76–77)
- Listed height: 5 ft 9 in (1.75 m)
- Listed weight: 120 lb (54 kg)

Career history

Playing
- 1971–1974: All-American Red Heads
- 1978–1979: Chicago Hustle
- 1979: New Jersey Gems
- 1980: New Mexico Energee

Coaching
- 1978–1979: Chicago Hustle (assistant)
- 1982–1984: Utah State
- Stats at Basketball Reference

Karen Logan (born 1949) is an American former basketball and volleyball player. She is the inventor of what is now the standardized size women's basketball. In the 1970s she was often credited as the top women's basketball player in the United States.

== College career ==
Logan attended Pepperdine University from 1967 to 1971. Initially recruited for track and tennis, her basketball talent was discovered by coach Gary Colson and she regularly scrimmaged with the men's team. She was undefeated on Pepperdine's first women's tennis team her senior year and was inducted into the Pepperdine Athletics Hall of Fame in 1981.

== Basketball career ==
From 1971 to 1974, she toured with the All-American Red Heads, a professional barnstorming team that often played against men's teams.

In 1975, CBS had Logan appear on Challenge of the Sexes, a nationally broadcast TV-show inspired by Billie Jean King and Bobby Riggs' Battle of the Sexes. On the show Logan played and defeated Jerry West in a game of H-O-R-S-E.

In June 1978, Logan became the first player to sign a contract with the newly created Women's Professional Basketball League (WBL).

While working with the WBL, Logan pitched an idea for a smaller ball for the women's game. The idea was accepted and the ball was first produced by Wilson Sporting Goods and adopted by the WBL, eventually becoming the standard for all levels of women's basketball.

Logan played for the Chicago Hustle for the first half of the 1978–79 WBL season. She broke her foot three months before the season and was told by her doctor it would take 10 to 11 months to heal. Shortly before the start of the season, she played a preseason game where she scored 20 points but was unable to walk the following day due to the injury. She continued playing through the injury but wasn't able to play at the level that was expected, leading to her being traded to the New Jersey Gems in January 1979. While both parties were interested, she declined to return to the Gems after the season due to unpaid salary.

Logan signed with the New Orleans Pride the following season but was cut before the seasons start after having been involved in an attempt to create the first labor union for professional women's athletes in cooperation with the NFL Players Association.

In 1980, she signed as a player-coach for the Tucson Storm of the short lived Ladies Professional Basketball Association (LPBA). After the team folded before the start of the season, she signed with New Mexico Energee and played a few games with the team before it and the LPBA folded.

She coached the Utah State University women's team from 1982 to 1984 before stepping away from basketball for good.

== Volleyball career ==
Logan played professional volleyball for two seasons in the International Volleyball Association.
