= Kayla Ard =

American basketball coach (born 1984)

Biographical details
- Born: February 10, 1984 (age 42); Hammond, Louisiana, U.S.

Playing career
- 2003–2004: Chipola
- 2004–2005: Southeastern Louisiana
- Position: Guard/forward

Coaching career (HC unless noted)
- 2005–2006: Hammond HS
- 2010–2012: Pensacola State (asst.)
- 2012–2013: Troy (asst.)
- 2013–2015: Clemson (asst.)
- 2015–2017: Dayton (asst.)
- 2017–2020: Denver (asst.)
- 2020: Denver (interim HC)
- 2020–2024: Utah State

Head coaching record
- Overall: 24–90 (.211)

Kayla Laine Ard (born February 10, 1984) is an American college basketball coach who was formerly the women's basketball head coach at Utah State.

== Early life and education ==
Born in Hammond, Louisiana, Ard grew up in nearby Loranger and graduated from Loranger High School in 2002. She played basketball for one season at Chipola College, then transferred to Southeastern Louisiana University, where she played three games in the 2004–05 season, averaging 3.0 points per game. She graduated from Southeastern Louisiana in 2010 with a bachelor's degree in general studies, and later earned a master's degree in psychology from the University of Phoenix in 2013.

== Coaching career ==
Ard started her coaching career as assistant coach of the AAU Domino's Basketball program in New Orleans, Louisiana, from 2003 to 2005, followed by one season as a coach at Hammond High School (2005–06 season), and head coach of the Hammond Tornadoes AAU organization in 2007. After coaching at Hammond, Ard was cast in the lead role of a Gatorade commercial, which aired from 2008 to 2009.

Ard was then a recruiter and assistant coach at Pensacola State College in Florida during the 2010–11 and 2011–12 seasons, then spent a year at Troy University, working under Chanda Rigby and athletic director John Hartwell. From 2013 to 2015, Ard was an assistant coach at Clemson University, then served as the assistant coach and recruiting coordinator at the University of Dayton from 2015 to 2017.

From 2017 to 2020, she was the associate head coach, recruiting coordinator, and offensive coordinator at the University of Denver, including 11 games in the 2019 season as the interim head coach.

On March 23, 2020, it was announced that she had been hired as the head coach for the Utah State University's basketball program. After a 4-win season and last place conference finish in Ard's debut season, the team improved to 11–19, and finished 9th of 11 teams in the conference. Following the 2021–22 season, 10 players departed the program, transferring to other programs. Following the roster overhaul, Utah State declined to 4–26 in 2022–23, including a 1–17 record in Mountain West Conference games.

Ard was dismissed from her position as head coach of the team following the 2023–24 season, where Utah State finished 5–25 and 2–16 (last place) in conference play. During her tenure, her teams finished last in the conference in three out of four seasons.

== Head coaching record ==
Record table
Season	Team	Overall	Conference	Standing	Postseason
Utah State Aggies (Mountain West Conference) (2020–2024)
2020–21	Utah State	4–20	2–16	10th (last)	
2021–22	Utah State	11–19	5–13	9th	
2022–23	Utah State	4–26	1–17	11th (last)	
2023–24	Utah State	5–25	2–16	11th (last)	
Utah State:		24–90 (.211)	10–62 (.139)		
Total:		24–90 (.211)			
