= Shayne Culpepper =

American middle-distance runner

Personal information
- Full name: Shayne Wille-Culpepper
- Nationality: United States
- Born: Shayne Wille; December 3, 1973 (age 52)
- Education: University of Colorado Boulder
- Spouse: Alan Culpepper
- Children: 4

Sport
- Sport: Athletics
- Event: Long-distance running

Achievements and titles
- World finals: 2004 Indoor; 3000 m, Bronze

Shayne Culpepper (née Wille; born December 3, 1973, in Atlanta U.S.) is a middle distance runner. She is a two-time Olympian in track and field. She competed in the 1,500 meters at the 2000 Summer Olympics and in the 5,000 meters at the 2004 Summer Olympics. She also won a bronze medal in the 3,000 meters at the 2004 World Athletics Indoor Championships.

She is married to long-distance track and road running athlete Alan Culpepper. In her early years Culpepper competed for many years in gymnastics.

After transferring from The University of Vermont after a year, she graduated from University of Colorado at Boulder with a degree in political science. She was a walk-on to the CU Boulder track team.

Although qualifying for the 2000 Summer Olympics in Sydney, Australia, due to Regina Jacobs falling ill, Shayne could not manage to progress through the qualifying rounds after running 4:12.52 in the 1,500m. After winning the 2004 5,000 m. Olympic trials she competed again at the 2004 Summer Olympics and placed 13th in the 5k at the first round, not allowing her to go on to the finals.

In 2003, she returned to athletics after having her first child, Cruz Samuel, and on February 16 won the national 4 kilometre cross-country championships. Alan won the men's championship the same day.

In March 2004 Shayne qualified for the 3,000 m. at the World Indoor Championships, she earned the bronze medal, finishing the race in less than a second behind the winner Meseret Defar and silver medalist Berhane Adere.

== Major achievements ==
- 2003
  - USA Cross Country Championships
    - 4 km. champion
  - USA Indoor Championships
    - 3,000 m. silver medal
    - 1,500 m. bronze medal
- 2004
  - World Indoor Championships - Budapest, Hungary.
    - 3,000 m. bronze medal
  - USA Indoor Championships
    - 3,000 m. gold medal
  - United States Olympic Trials
    - 5,000 m. champion
- 2007
  - USA Indoor Championships
    - mile m. gold medal

== Video Links ==
- Flotrack Videos of Shayne Culpepper
