= Erie High School (Colorado) =

Location
- 3180 County Road 5 Erie, Colorado 80516; United States; 40°02′52″N 105°00′57″W

Information
- Motto: “Taking excellence to the next level.”
- Established: 2005 (21 years ago)
- School district: St. Vrain Valley School District
- CEEB code: 060545
- Principal: Josh Griffin
- Staff: 75.09 (FTE)
- Grades: 9-12
- Student to teacher ratio: 23.43
- Campus type: Open (upperclass), closed (underclass)
- Colors: Black and orange
- Athletics: Football, softball, tennis, soccer, golf, volleyball, competitive cheer, cross-country, dance, basketball, wrestling, swimming, baseball, track & field, and lacrosse.
- Athletics conference: 4A
- Mascot: Tiger
- Rival: Broomfield High School
- Website: ehs.svvsd.org

Erie High School is the sole high school in the town of Erie, Colorado. The school is a part of the St. Vrain Valley School District.

The school was formed by the separation of Erie Middle and High School. Currently there are over 1400 students attending the school. It is anticipated that each Freshman class will now enter Erie High School with around 400 students. The building was designed to honor the town of Erie's mining history, as the color scheme is of the color of coal, though the school colors are tiger orange and black. The school opened its doors in 2005 and was later expanded to accommodate enrollment growth in 2018.

Due to overcapacity, the school has put a hold on its open enrollment program. All students that aren’t in the high schools zone will be denied access.

Josh Griffin is now the school's current principal. Matthew Buchler was its principal until his departure in 2022. Steven Payne was its principal from 2001 until his retirement in 2013.

== Athletics ==
Erie High School is nationally known for its softball team, which has won 12 state championships, the most all-time in Colorado high school history.

In 2021, its football team played against Chatfield High School at Empower Field.

Year	Class	Runner-up	Score
1998	3A	La Junta	7-0
2000	3A	La Junta	8-2
2001	3A	Roosevelt	3-0
2002	3A	Lamar	6-5
2003	3A	La Junta	9-0
2004	3A	Frederick	8-0
2005	3A	Holy Family	2-0
2007	3A	Holy Family	5-2
2008	3A	Holy Family	6-0
2009	3A	Burlington	8-0
2010	4A	D'Evelyn	6-1
2019	4A	Golden	13-9

Erie High's Cheer team won state titles in 2007, 2018, 2019, 2020, 2021, and 2022.

== Demographics ==
The following are demographics of the 1,727 students attending during the 2024-2025 school year:

- American Indian/Alaska Native: 0.12%
- Asian: 4.57%
- Native Hawaiian/Pacific Islander: 0.06%
- Hispanic: 14.48%
- Black: 0.75%
- White: 77.42%
- Two or more races: 2.61%

(Percentages may not add to 100% due to rounding)

== Notable alumni ==
- Jaccob Slavin - Defenseman for the Carolina Hurricanes of the National Hockey League and Team USA.
