= Utah State Aggies women's basketball =

Women's college basketball team

2026–27 Utah State Aggies women's basketball team
- University: Utah State University
- First season: 1971–72 (AIAW); 1982–83 (NCAA)
- Head coach: Wesley Brooks (3rd season)
- Location: Logan, Utah
- Arena: Smith Spectrum (capacity: 10,270)
- Conference: Pac-12
- Nickname: Aggies
- Colors: Navy blue, white, and pewter gray
- Student section: The Hurd
- All-time record: 234–440 (.347)

AIAW tournament appearances
- 1972, 1973, 1974, 1975

Conference regular-season champions
- 1974

Uniforms
Home	Away	Alternate

The Utah State Aggies women’s basketball team represents Utah State University in NCAA Division I competition. The Aggies compete in the Pac-12 Conference (Pac-12). They play their home games at the Smith Spectrum. As of the end of the 2023–24 regular season, the Aggies have an all-time record of 234 wins and 440 losses.

== History ==
The Aggies started play in the 1971-72 season as a member of the AIAW. They made the AIAW First Round in their first four years and the regionals in their final year of being in the AIAW during the 1981-82 season. Utah State joined the NCAA as an independent for the 1982-83 season where they would go on to only win 18 games in the last five years of the program's first run in basketball. The women's team was shuttered from 1988 to 2002. Utah State played in the Intermountain Athletic Conference from 1973 to 1982, played as an Independent from 1982 to 1984, the High Country Athletic Conference from 1984 to 1987, the Big West Conference from 2003 to 2005, and the Western Athletic Conference from 2006 to 2013 before joining the Mountain West Conference in 2014.

The Aggies have made appearances in the WNIT in 2011 and 2012, as well as the three appearances in WBI tournaments. The Aggies have won only a single conference title as a member of the AIAW, and as a result have never qualified for the NCAA Division I women's basketball tournament.

In November 2019, Jerry Finkbeiner, in his eight season as head coach of the Aggies, stepped down for medical reasons. His three postseason tournament appearances are the most among Aggies head coaches all-time.

In March 2020, Southeastern Louisiana alum Kayla Ard was named as head coach. Under Ard, the Aggies amassed four consecutive losing seasons, including 26 losses in 2022–23, which is tied for the most losses by any Utah State women's basketball team in program history. Ard herself announced she was fired during the press conference of the 2024 Mountain West tournament game, following another 25-loss season.

Season	Record	Conference Record	Coach
1972–73	17–3	n/a	Fern Gardner
1973–74	12–2	8–0	Fern Gardner
1974–75	14–6	10–3	Fern Gardner
1975–76	12–9	10–3	Fern Gardner
1976–77	12–12	9–4	Marilyn Weiss
1977–78	9–14	8–5	Marilyn Weiss
1978–79	14–10	5–8	Cindy Perkins
1979–80	13–15	5–5	Cindy Perkins
1980–81	12–19	5–5	Cindy Perkins
1981–82	12–20	6–4	Cindy Perkins
1982–83	3–22	n/a	Karen Logan
1983–84	2–23	n/a	Karen Logan
1984–85	9–19	3–9	Bob Corbin
1985–86	3 - 25	0–12	Bob Corbin
1986–87	1–26	0–12	Lloydene Searle
2003–04	5–22	5–13 (10th)	Raegan Pebley
2004–05	14–14	9–9 (6th)	Raegan Pebley
2005–06	3–24	2–14 (9th)	Raegan Pebley
2006–07	11–18	7–9 (6th)	Raegan Pebley
2007–08	9–20	5–11 (7th)	Raegan Pebley
2008–09	16–15	9–7 (5th)	Raegan Pebley
2009–10	13–17	5–11 (7th)	Raegan Pebley
2010–11	18–15	10–6 (3rd)	Raegan Pebley
2011–12	21–10	11–3 (2nd)	Raegan Pebley
2012–13	18–14	14–4 (2nd)	Jerry Finkbeiner
2013–14	15–16	8–10 (8th)	Jerry Finkbeiner
2014–15	8–23	5–13 (10th)	Jerry Finkbeiner
2015–16	14–17	8–10 (7th)	Jerry Finkbeiner
2016–17	17–15	9–9 (6th)	Jerry Finkbeiner
2017–18	7–23	5–13 (T-8th)	Jerry Finkbeiner
2018–19	17–16	10–9 (T-5th)	Jerry Finkbeiner
2019–20	8–23	2–16 (11th)	Ben Finkbeiner (interim)
2020–21	4–20	2–16 (10th)	Kayla Ard
2021–22	11–19	5–13 (9th)	Kayla Ard
2022–23	4–26	1–17 (11th)	Kayla Ard
2023–24	5–25	2–16 (T-10th)	Kayla Ard
2024–25	4–27	3–15 (T-10th)	Wesley Brooks

== Postseason ==
=== WNIT ===
The Aggies have appeared in two WNIT tournaments. Their combined record is 1–2.

Year	Seed	Round	Opponent	Result
2011	––––	First Round Second Round	Arizona BYU	W 103–95 L 102–63
2012	––––	First Round	Utah	L 69–58

=== WBI ===
The Aggies have appeared in three Women's Basketball Invitational tournaments. Their combined record is 1–3.

Year	Seed	Round	Opponent	Result
2013	#3	First Round	South Dakota	L 77–69
2017	––––	First Round	Idaho	L 64–59
2019	––––	First Round Quarterfinals	UC Riverside North Texas	W 68–60 L 56–54

=== AIAW Division I ===
The Aggies made four appearances in the AIAW Division I women's basketball tournament, with a combined record of 1–8.

Year	Round	Opponent	Result
1972	First Round; Consolation First Round; Consolation Second Round	West Chester State; Washington State; Queens (NY)	L 45–79; W 40–37; L 57–65
1973	First Round; Consolation First Round	Stephen F. Austin; UC Riverside	L 48–53; L 41–47
1974	First Round; Consolation First Round	William Penn; Illinois State	L 34–54; L 46–74
1975	First Round; Consolation First Round	Tennessee Tech; Federal City	L 45–91; L 34–89
