= 2022–23 Mountain West Conference men's basketball season =

- League: NCAA Division I
- Sport: Basketball
- Duration: November 7th 2022 - March 11th 2023
- Teams: 11
- TV partner(s): AltitudeTV, Altitude2, ATTSN CBSSN, CBS/Paramount+, Cowboy Sports Network, ESPN, ESPN2, ESPNU, ESPNews, ESPN+, ESPN3, Evoca, FloSports, FOX, Fox Sports 1, NBCSBA NSN, Stadium/MWN, Pac-12 Network, SECN, WCC Network, YouTube, YurView

Regular season
- Regular season champions: San Diego State
- Season MVP: Omari Moore

Mountain West tournament
- Champions: San Diego State
- Runners-up: Utah State
- Tournament MVP: Matt Bradley

Mountain West men's basketball seasons
- ← 2021–22 2023–24 →

2022–23 Mountain West Conference men's basketball standings
	Conf.				Overall
Team	W		L	PCT	W		L	PCT
No. 18 San Diego State †	15	–	3	.833	32	–	7	.821
Boise State	13	–	5	.722	24	–	10	.706
Utah State	13	–	5	.722	26	–	9	.743
Nevada	12	–	6	.667	22	–	11	.667
San Jose State	10	–	8	.556	21	–	14	.600
New Mexico	8	–	10	.444	22	–	12	.647
UNLV	7	–	11	.389	19	–	13	.594
Colorado State	6	–	12	.333	15	–	18	.455
Fresno State	6	–	12	.333	11	–	20	.355
Air Force	5	–	13	.278	14	–	18	.438
Wyoming	4	–	14	.222	9	–	22	.290
† Conference tournament winner Rankings from AP poll

The 2022–23 Mountain West Conference men's basketball season began with practices in October followed by the 2022–23 NCAA Division I men's basketball season which started on November 7, 2022. Conference play will begin in December 2022.

The Mountain West tournament will take place in March 2023 at the Thomas & Mack Center in Las Vegas, Nevada.

== Pre-season ==
=== Recruiting classes ===
Rankings
Team	ESPN	Rivals	On3 Recruits	247 Sports	Signees
Air Force	—	―	No. 117	―	3
Boise State	―	―	No. 82	No. 84	2
Colorado State	―	―	No. 116	No. 134	2
Fresno State	―	No. 37		No. 85	4
Nevada	―	―	No. 78	No. 90	3
New Mexico	―	―	No. 122	No. 52	3
San Diego State	―	―	No. 64	No. 63	2
San Jose State	―	―	No. 111	No. 126	4
UNLV	―	―	No. 221	―	1
Utah State	―	―	―	―	―
Wyoming	―	No. 51	No. 169	No. 124	3

=== Preseason watchlists ===
Below is a table of notable preseason watch lists.

Player	Wooden	Naismith	Cousy	West	Erving	Malone	Abdul-Jabbar	Olson
Matt Bradley	✓	✓		✓				✓
Graham Ike		✓				✓		
GG Jackson						✓		
Hunter Maldonado	✓	✓						✓
Isaiah Stevens			✓					

=== Preseason All-American teams ===
Player	The Athletic	Blue Ribbon Sports	CBS	College Hoops Today

=== Preseason polls ===
	247 Sports	AP	Blue Ribbon	CBS Sports	Coaches	ESPN	KenPom	Lindy's; Sports	NCAA Sports	Sports; Illustrated
Air Force	–	–	–	–	–	–	No. 235	–	–	–
Boise State	–	–	–	–	–	–	No. 87	–	–	–
Colorado State	–	–	–	–	–	–	No. 97	–	–	–
Fresno State	–	–	–	–	–	–	No. 107	–	–	–
Nevada	–	–	–	–	–	–	No. 132	–	–	–
New Mexico	–	–	–	–	–	–	No. 138	–	–	–
San Diego State	No. 14	No. 19	No. 25	No. 21	No. 20	No. 21	No. 19	–	No. 20	No. 14
San Jose State	–	–	–	–	–	–	No. 236	–	–	–
UNLV	–	–	–	–	–	–	No. 118	–	–	–
Utah State	–	–	–	–	–	–	No. 68	–	–	–
Wyoming	RV	–	–	–	RV	No. 30	No. 64	–	No. 25	–

=== Mountain West Media days ===
The Mountain West will conduct its 2022 Mountain West media days on October 20, 2022.

The teams and representatives in respective order were as follows:

- Mountain West Commissioner – Craig Thompson
- Air Force – Joe Scott (HC)
- Boise State – Leon Rice (HC)
- Colorado State – Niko Medved (HC)
- Fresno State – Justin Hutson (HC)
- Nevada – Steve Alford (HC)
- New Mexico – Richard Pitino (HC)
- San Diego State – Brian Dutcher (HC)
- San Jose State – Tim Miles (HC)
- UNLV – Kevin Kruger (HC)
- Utah State – Ryan Odom (HC)
- Wyoming – Jeff Linder (HC)

Men's Basketball Preseason Poll
Place	Team	Points	First place votes
1.	San Diego State	216	16
2.	Wyoming	204	4
3.	Boise State	166	--
4.	Colorado State	156	--
5.	New Mexico	136	--
6.	UNLV	110	--
7.	Fresno State	101	--
8.	Utah State	96	--
9.	Nevada	73	--
10.	San Jose State	35	--
11.	Air Force	27	--

=== Mountain West Preseason All-Conference ===
First Team

Name	School	Pos.	Yr.	Ht.	Hometown (Last School)
Isaiah Stevens	Colorado State	G	Sr.	6−0, 185	Allen, TX (Allen HS)
Jamal Mashburn Jr.	New Mexico	G	Jr.	6−2, 195	Miami, FL (Brewster Academy)
Matt Bradley	San Diego State	G	JS.	6−4, 220	San Bernardino, CA (Wasatch Academy)
Graham Ike	Wyoming	F	Jr.	6−9, 225	Aurora, CO (Overland HS)
Hunter Maldonado	Wyoming	G	Sr.	6−7, 220	Colorado Springs, CO (Vista Ridge HS)

2023 Mountain West Men's Basketball Individual Awards
Award	Recipient(s)
Player of the Year	Graham Ike
Newcomer of the Year	Darrion Trammell
Freshman of the Year	Joseph Hunter

=== Midseason watchlists ===
Below is a table of notable midseason watch lists.

Player	Wooden	Naismith	Robertson	Cousy	West	Erving	Malone	Abdul-Jabbar	Olson

=== Final watchlists ===
Below is a table of notable year end watch lists.

Wooden	Naismith	Robertson	Cousy	West	Erving	Malone	Abdul-Jabbar	Olson

== Regular season ==
The Schedule will be released in late October. All regular season conference games and conference tournament games would be broadcast nationally by ESPN Inc. family of networks including ABC, ESPN, ESPN2 and ESPNU, FOX, FS1, CBS Sports, AltitudeTV, AT&T Sports Network, Cowboy Sports Network, Evoca, FloSports, NBC Bay Area, Nevada Sports Network, Mountain West Network, Pac-12 Network, SEC Network, WCC Network, YouTube Live and YurView

=== Early season tournaments ===
Team	Tournament	Finish
Air Force	−	−
Boise State	Myrtle Beach Invitational	5th
Colorado State	Charleston Classic	4th
Fresno State	Wooden Legacy	4th
Nevada	Cayman Islands Classic	3rd
New Mexico	−	−
San Diego State	Maui Invitational tournament	4th
San Jose State	Nassau Championship	5th
UNLV	SoCal Challenge	1st
Utah State	Diamond Head Classic	3rd
Wyoming	Paradise Jam tournament	4th

=== Records against other conferences ===
Records against non-conference foes for the 2022–23 season. Records shown for regular season only.

Regular season

Power Conferences	Record
ACC	0–1
Big East	0–0
Big Ten	2–1
Big 12	0–1
Pac-12	5–5
SEC	2–3
Power Conferences Total	9–11
Other NCAA Division I Conferences	Record
American	3–0
America East	0–0
A-10	3–1
ASUN	2–0
Big Sky	5–4
Big South	3–0
Big West	11–1
CAA	1–2
C-USA	2–3
Horizon	2–0
Ivy League	0–0
MAAC	1–0
MAC	2–1
MEAC	2–0
MVC	2–1
NEC	0–0
OVC	0–0
Patriot League	0–0
SoCon	0–0
Southland	5–2
SWAC	6–0
The Summit	3–1
Sun Belt	5–0
WAC	10–1
WCC	12–10
Other Division I Total	81–28
Division II NAIA Total	10–0
NCAA Division I Total	99–39

Postseason

Power Conferences	Record
ACC	0–0
Big East	0–0
Big Ten	0–0
Big 12	0–0
Pac-12	0–0
SEC	0–0
Power Conferences Total	0–0
Other NCAA Division 1 Conferences	Record
American	0–0
America East	0–0
A-10	0–0
ASUN	0–0
Big Sky	0–0
Big South	0–0
Big West	0–0
CAA	0–0
C-USA	0–0
Horizon	0–0
Ivy League	0–0
MAAC	0–0
MAC	0–0
MEAC	0–0
MVC	0–0
NEC	0–0
OVC	0–0
Patriot League	0–0
SoCon	0–0
Southland	0–0
SWAC	0–0
The Summit	0–0
Sun Belt	0–0
WAC	0–0
WCC	0–0
Other Division I Total	0–0
NCAA Division I Total	0–0

=== Record against ranked non-conference opponents ===
This is a list of games against ranked opponents only (rankings from the AP Poll):

Date	Visitor	Home	Site	Significance	Score	Conference record
Nov. 15	No. 21 Dayton	UNLV	Thomas & Mack Center ● Las Vegas, NV	−	UNLV 60−52	1−0
Nov. 22	No. 14 Arizona	No. 17 San Diego State†	Lahaina Civic Center ● Maui, HI	Maui Invitational	Arizona 70−87	1−1
Nov. 22	No. 9 Arkansas	No. 17 San Diego State†	Lahaina Civic Center ● Maui, HI	Maui Invitational	Arkansas 78−74^{OT}	1−2
Dec. 3	San Jose State	No. 3 Arkansas	Bud Walton Arena ● Fayetteville, AR	–	Arkansas 58−99	1−3

Team rankings are reflective of AP poll when the game was played, not current or final ranking

=== Conference schedule ===
This table summarizes the head-to-head results between teams in conference play.

	Air Force	Boise State	Colorado State	Fresno State	Nevada	New Mexico	San Diego State	San Jose State	UNLV	Utah State	Wyoming
vs. Air Force	–	1–0	1–1	1–1	2–0	1–1	2–0	2–0	1–0	2–0	0–2
vs. Boise State	0–1	–	0–2	0–1	1–1	1–1	1–1	1–1	0–2	1–1	0–2
vs. Colorado State	1–1	2–0	–	0–2	1–0	1–1	2–0	2–0	1–1	1–0	1–1
vs. Fresno State	1–1	1–0	2–0	–	2–0	1–1	1–0	1–1	0–2	2–0	1–1
vs. Nevada	0–2	1–1	0–1	0–2	–	0–2	1–1	0–2	2–0	1–1	1–0
vs. New Mexico	1–1	1–1	1–1	1–1	2–0	–	1–1	0–2	1–0	1–0	1–1
vs. San Diego State	0–2	1–1	0–2	0–1	1–1	1–1	–	0–1	0–2	0–2	0–2
vs. San Jose State	0–2	1–1	0–2	1–1	2–0	2–0	1–0	–	0–2	1–1	0–1
vs. UNLV	0–1	2–0	1–1	2–0	0–2	0–1	2–0	2–0	–	2–0	0–2
vs. Utah State	0–2	1–1	0–1	0–2	1–1	0–1	2–0	1–1	0–2	–	0–2
vs. Wyoming	2–0	2–0	1–1	1–1	0–1	1–1	2–0	1–0	2–0	2–0	–
Total	5–13	13–5	6–12	6–12	12–6	8–10	15–3	10–8	7–11	13–5	4–14

=== Points scored ===
Team	For	Against	Difference
Air Force	2,072	2,068	4
Boise State	2,235	1,975	260
Colorado State	2,263	2,226	37
Fresno State	1,909	1,969	-60
Nevada	2,247	2,059	188
New Mexico	2,517	2,275	242
San Diego State	2,188	1,932	256
San Jose State	2,098	2,058	40
UNLV	2,222	2,084	138
Utah State	2,451	2,170	281
Wyoming	2,068	2,147	-79

Through March 5, 2023

=== Rankings ===
	Improvement in ranking
	Drop in ranking
RV	Received votes but were not ranked in Top 25
NV	No votes received

Team	Poll	Pre	Wk 2	Wk 3	Wk 4	Wk 5	Wk 6	Wk 7	Wk 8	Wk 9	Wk 10	Wk 11	Wk 12	Wk 13	Wk 14	Wk 15	Wk 16	Wk 17	Wk 18	Final
Air Force	AP	NV	NV	NV	NV	NV	NV	NV	NV	NV	NV	NV	NV	NV	NV	NV	NV	NV	NV	
Air Force	C	NV	NV	NV	NV	NV	NV	NV	NV	NV	NV	NV	NV	NV	NV	NV	NV	NV	NV	
Boise State	AP	NV	NV	NV	NV	NV	NV	NV	NV	NV	NV	RV	RV	RV	NV	RV	RV	RV	RV	
Boise State	C	RV	NV	NV	NV	NV	NV	NV	NV	NV	RV	RV	NV	RV	NV	NV	RV	RV	RV	
Colorado State	AP	NV	NV	NV	NV	NV	NV	NV	NV	NV	NV	NV	NV	NV	NV	NV	NV	NV	NV	
Colorado State	C	NV	NV	NV	NV	NV	NV	NV	NV	NV	NV	NV	NV	NV	NV	NV	NV	NV	NV	
Fresno State	AP	NV	NV	NV	NV	NV	NV	NV	NV	NV	NV	NV	NV	NV	NV	NV	NV	NV	NV	
Fresno State	C	NV	NV	NV	NV	NV	NV	NV	NV	NV	NV	NV	NV	NV	NV	NV	NV	NV	NV	
Nevada	AP	NV	NV	NV	NV	NV	NV	NV	NV	NV	RV	NV	NV	RV	RV	RV	RV	RV	NV	
Nevada	C	NV	NV	NV	NV	NV	NV	NV	NV	NV	RV	RV	NV	NV	RV	RV	NV	RV	NV	
New Mexico	AP	NV	NV	NV	RV	RV	RV	RV	22	21	RV	RV	25	RV	RV	NV	NV	NV	NV	
New Mexico	C	NV	NV	NV	NV	RV	RV	RV	RV	22	RV	RV	RV	RV	RV	NV	NV	NV	NV	
San Diego State	AP	19	17	17	24	22	RV	RV	RV	RV	23	RV	RV	22	25	21	22	18	20	
San Diego State	C	20	19	19	24	22	RV	RV	RV	RV	25	RV	RV	RV	23	20	20	19	20	
San Jose State	AP	NV	NV	NV	NV	NV	NV	NV	NV	NV	NV	NV	NV	NV	NV	NV	NV	NV	NV	
San Jose State	C	NV	NV	NV	NV	NV	NV	NV	NV	NV	NV	NV	NV	NV	NV	NV	NV	NV	NV	
UNLV	AP	NV	NV	RV	RV	RV	RV	NV	NV	NV	NV	NV	NV	NV	NV	NV	NV	NV	NV	
UNLV	C	NV	NV	NV	RV	RV	RV	NV	NV	NV	NV	NV	NV	NV	NV	NV	NV	NV	NV	
Utah State	AP	NV	NV	RV	NV	NV	RV	RV	NV	NV	NV	NV	NV	NV	RV	NV	NV	NV	NV	
Utah State	C	NV	NV	NV	NV	RV	RV	RV	RV	NV	NV	NV	NV	NV	RV	NV	NV	NV	NV	
Wyoming	AP	RV	NV	NV	NV	NV	NV	NV	NV	NV	NV	NV	NV	NV	NV	NV	NV	NV	NV	
Wyoming	C	RV	NV	NV	NV	NV	NV	NV	NV	NV	NV	NV	NV	NV	NV	NV	NV	NV	NV	

== NVHead coaches ==
=== Coaches ===
Note: Stats shown are before the beginning of the season. Mountain West records are from time at current school.

Team	Head coach	Previous job	Seasons at school	Record at school	Mountain West record	Mountain West titles	NCAA tournaments	NCAA Final Fours	NCAA Championships
Air Force	Joe Scott	Denver	3rd	16–38 (.296)	7–30 (.189)	0	0	0	0
Boise State	Leon Rice	Gonzaga (assistant)	13th	244–145 (.627)	128–83 (.607)	2	3	0	0
Colorado State	Niko Medved	Drake	5th	76–45 (.628)	46–26 (.648)	0	1	0	0
Fresno State	Justin Hutson	San Diego State (assistant)	5th	69–53 (.566)	37–36 (.507)	0	0	0	0
Nevada	Steve Alford	UCLA	4th	47–39 (.547)	28–25 (.528)	0	0	0	0
New Mexico	Richard Pitino	Minnesota	2nd	139–19 (.406)	5–12 (.294)	0	0	0	0
San Diego State	Brian Dutcher	San Diego State (associate HC)	6th	119–39 (.753)	66–22 (.750)	2	3	0	0
San Jose State	Tim Miles	Nebraska	2nd	8–23 (.258)	1–17 (.056)	0	0	0	0
UNLV	Kevin Kruger	UNLV (assistant)	2nd	18–14 (.563)	10–8 (.556)	0	0	0	0
Utah State	Ryan Odom	UMBC	2nd	18–16 (.529)	8–10 (.444)	0	0	0	0
Wyoming	Jeff Linder	Northern Colorado	3rd	39–20 (.661)	20–14 (.588)	0	1	0	0

Notes:

- Mountain West records, conference titles, etc. are from time at current school and are through the end the 2021–22 season.
- NCAA tournament appearances are from time at current school only.
- NCAA Final Fours and Championship include time at other schools.

== Postseason ==
=== Mountain West tournament ===
The conference tournament will be played in March 8−11, 2023 at the Thomas & Mack Center in Las Vegas, NV. The top five teams will have a bye on the first day. Teams will be seeded by conference record, with ties broken by record between the tied teams followed by record against the regular-season champion, if necessary.

First round Wednesday, March 8 Stadium/MWN
8	Colorado State	67
9	Fresno State	65
7	UNLV	78*
10	Air Force	70
6	New Mexico	87
11	Wyoming	76

Quarterfinals; Thursday, March 9 CBSSN
1	San Diego State	64
8	Colorado State	61
4	Nevada	77
5	San Jose State	81*
2	Boise State	87*
7	UNLV	76
3	Utah State	91
6	New Mexico	76

Semifinals; Friday, March 10; CBSSN
1	San Diego State	64
5	San Jose State	49
2	Boise State	62
3	Utah State	72

Championship; Saturday, March 11; CBS/Paramount+
1	San Diego State	62
3	Utah State	57

* denotes overtime period

=== NCAA tournament ===
Four teams were selected to participate:

Seed	Region	School	First Four	First round	Second round	Sweet 16	Elite Eight	Final Four	Championship
5	South	San Diego State	n/a	defeated (12) Charleston 63–57	defeated (13) Furman 75–52	defeated (1) Alabama 71–64	defeated (6) Creighton 57–56	defeated (9E) Florida Atlantic 72–71	lost to (4W) UConn 59–76
10	South	Utah State	n/a	lost to (7) Missouri 65–76					
10	West	Boise State	n/a	lost to (7) Northwestern 67–75					
11	West	Nevada	lost to (11) Arizona State 73–98						
		W–L (%):	0–1 (.000)	1–2 (.333)	1–0 (1.000)	1–0 (1.000)	1–0 (1.000)	1–0 (1.000)	0–1 (.000) Total: 5–4 (.556)

=== National Invitation Tournament ===
One team was selected to participate:

Seed	Bracket	School	First round	Second round	Quarterfinals	Semifinals	Finals
2	Rutgers	New Mexico	lost to Utah Valley 69–83				
		W–L (%):	0–1 (.000)	0–0 (–)	0–0 (–)	0–0 (–)	Total: 0–1 (.000)

== Awards and honors ==
=== Players of the Week ===
Throughout the regular season, the Mountain West offices honored two players based on performance by naming them player of the week and freshman of the week.

Week	Player of the week	School	Freshman of the week	School
Nov 14	Darrion Trammell	San Diego State	Darrion Williams	Nevada
Nov 21	EJ Harkless	UNLV	Darrion Williams (2)	Nevada
Nov 28	Morris Udeze	New Mexico	Corbin Green	Air Force
Dec 5	Max Rice	Boise State	Donovan Dent	New Mexico
Dec 12	Noah Reynolds	Wyoming	Rytis Petraitis	Air Force
Dec 19	Isaiah Stevens	Colorado State	Rytis Petraitis (2)	Air Force
Dec 26	Will Baker	Nevada	Rytis Petraitis (3)	Air Force
Jan 2	Matt Bradley	San Diego State	Rytis Petraitis (4)	Air Force
Jan 9	EJ Harkless (2)	UNLV	Nick Davidson	Nevada
Jan 16	Jaelen House	New Mexico	Marcell McCreary	Air Force
Jan 23	Jamal Mashburn Jr.	New Mexico	Rytis Petraitis (5)	Air Force
Jan 30	EJ Harkless (3)	UNLV	Darrion Williams (3)	Nevada
Feb 6	Jarod Lucas	Nevada	Nate Barnhart	Wyoming
Feb 13	Matt Bradley (2)	San Diego State	Darrion Williams (4)	Nevada
Feb 20	Max Shulga	Utah State	Rytis Petraitis (6)	Air Force
Feb 27	Omari Moore	San Jose State	Darrion Williams (4)	Nevada

==== Totals per school ====
School	Total
Air Force	8
Nevada	8
New Mexico	4
San Diego State	3
UNLV	3
Wyoming	2
Boise State	1
Colorado State	1
San Jose State	1
Utah State	1
Fresno State	0

=== All-District ===
The United States Basketball Writers Association (USBWA) named the following from the Mountain West to their All-District Teams:

District VIII

All-District Team

District IX

Player of the Year

All-District Team

=== Mountain West season awards ===
The Mountain West presents two separate sets of major awards—one voted on by conference coaches and the other by media.

2023 Mountain West Men's Basketball Individual Awards
Award	Recipient(s)
Player of the Year	Omari Moore, San José State
Coach of the Year	Tim Miles, San José State
Newcomer of the Year	Jarod Lucas, Nevada
Defensive Player of the Year	Nathan Mensah, San Diego State
Sixth Man of the Year	Dan Akin, Utah State
Freshman of the Year	Darrion Williams, Nevada
Scholar-Athlete of the Year	

==== All-MWC ====
First Team

Name	School	Pos.	Yr.	Ht.	Hometown (Last School)
Tyson Degenhart	Boise State	F	So.		
Isaiah Stevens	Colorado State	G	Sr.		
Jamal Mashburn Jr.	New Mexico	G	Jr.		
Matt Bradley	San Diego State	G	Sr.		
Omari Moore	San José State	G	Sr.		
Steven Ashworth	Utah State	G	Jr.		

- ‡ Mountain West Player of the Year
- ††† three-time All-Mountain West First Team honoree
- †† two-time All-Mountain West First Team honoree
- † two-time All-Mountain West honoree

Second Team

Name	School	Pos.	Yr.	Ht.	Hometown (Last School)
Max Rice	Boise State	G	Sr.		
Kenan Blackshear	Nevada	G	Sr.		
Jarod Lucas	Nevada	G	Sr.		
Jaelen House	New Mexico	G	Sr.		
EJ Harkless	UNLV	G	Sr.		
Hunter Maldonado	Wyoming	G	Sr.		

Third Team

Name	School	Pos.	Yr.	Ht.	Hometown (Last School)
Jake Heidbreder	Air Force	G	So.		
Marcus Shaver Jr.	Boise State	F	Sr.		
Will Baker	Nevada	C	Jr.		
Morris Udeze	New Mexico	F	5th		
Lamont Butler	San Diego State	G	Jr.		
Nathan Mensah	San Diego State	F	Sr.		

Honorable Mention:
Isaiah Hill, Sr., G, Fresno State
Max Shulga, Jr., G, Utah State

==== All-Freshman Team ====
Name	School	Pos.	Ht.

† Mountain West Player of the Year ‡ Mountain West Freshman of the Year

Honorable Mention

==== All-Defensive Team ====
Name	School	Pos.	Yr.	Ht.
Kenan Blackshear	Nevada	G	Sr.	
Tré Coleman	Nevada	F	Jr.	
Jaelen House	New Mexico	G	Jr.	
Lamont Butler	San Diego State	G	Jr.	
Nathan Mensah	San Diego State	F	Jr.	

- † Mountain West Player of the Year
- ‡ Mountain West Defensive Player of the Year
- †† two-time Mountain West All-Defensive Team honoree

Honorable Mention

==== Scholar Athlete of the year ====
Name	School	Pos.	Ht., Wt.	GPA	Major

== 2022–23 Season statistic leaders ==
Scoring leaders
Rk	Player	PTS	PPG
1	Jamal Mashburn Jr.	305	17.9
2	Jarod Lucas	300	16.7
3	Eligah Harkless	249	16.6
4	Jaelen House	282	16.6
5	Morris Udeze	272	16.0

Rebound leaders
Rk	Player	REB	RPG
1	Josiah Allick	140	8.2
2	Morris Udeze	135	7.9
3	Isaih Moore	126	7.9
4	Sage Tolbert	140	7.8
5	Daniel Akin	125	7.4

Field goal leaders (avg 5 fga/gm)
Rk	Player	FG	FGA	PCT
1	Patrick Cartier	96	147	65.3%
2	Morris Udeze	102	170	60.0%
3	Noah Reynolds	71	131	54.2%
4	Jake Heidbreder	86	173	49.7%
5	Tyson Degenhart	80	172	46.5%

Assist leaders
Rk	Player	AST	APG
1	Jaelen House	86	4.8
2	Kenan Blackshear	86	4.8
3	Pmari Moore	86	4.8
4	Max Shulga	74	4.4
5	Steven Ashworth	72	4.2

Block leaders
Rk	Player	BLK	BPG
1	Ibrahima Diallo	39	2.2
2	Corbin Green	26	2.0
3	David Muoka	23	1.5
4	Nathan Mensah	24	1.5
5	Lukas Milner	15	0.9

Free throw leaders
Rk	Player	FT	FTA	PCT
1	Jake Heidbreder	53	60	88.3%
2	Will Baker	49	56	87.5%
3	Jarod Lucas	82	96	85.4%
4	Steven Ashworth	54	65	83.1%
5	Jaelen House	81	98	82.7%

Steal leaders
Rk	Player	STL	SPG
1	Jaelen House	81	3.0
2	Keshon Gilbert	34	2.3
3	Luis Rodriguez	34	2.3
4	Marcus Shaver Jr.	24	2.0
5	Lamont Butler	30	1.9

Three point leaders
Rk	Player	3P	3PA	%
1	Steven Ashworth	58	113	51.3%
2	Taylor Funk	43	107	40.2%
3	Jake Heidbreder	43	109	39.4%
4	Jarod Lucas	48	127	37.8%
5				

== Home game attendance ==
Team	Stadium	Capacity	Game 1	Game 2	Game 3	Game 4	Game 5	Game 6	Game 7	Game 8	Game 9	Game 10	Game 11	Game 12	Game 13	Game 14	Game 15	Game 16	Game 17	Game 18	Game 19	Total	Average	% of Capacity
Air Force	Clune Arena	6,002	1,625	1,131	1,276	1,022	1,490	1,196	1,176	855	1,119	1,038	1,704†	1,461	1,257	1,489	843	1,068	1,899	847	1,611	24,107	1,269	21.13%
Boise State	ExtraMile Arena	12,644	9,796	4,157	8,544	7,511	7,195	7,254	7,715	8,113	12,007	9,653	9,010	12,021	11,037	9,825	12,208†					136,046	9,070	71.73%
Colorado State	Moby Arena	8,745	4,435	5,028	3,769	3,884	4,342	5,439	3,563	4,268	4,196	4,003	6,008	4,657	6,018	3,521	8,083†	4,936				76,150	4,759	54.42%
Fresno State	Save Mart Center	15,596	3,675	3,123	3,008	3,913	4,165	4,868	5,864	5,950	6,817	5,090	7,012†	7,137	5,107	5,145						70,874	5,062	32.45%
Nevada	Lawlor Events Center	12,000	5,407	5,705	4,904	6,693	5,380	7,911	6,102	7,315	8,292	9,357	10,186	8,571	8,780	11,327†						105,930	7,566	63.05%
New Mexico	The Pit	15,411	8,181	9,466	9,033	8,715	8,434	8,329	10,049	14,534	9,425	15,215	**15,424**	9,249	11,519	14,566	15,143	15,009	11,185	**15,431**	**12,520**†	221,427	11,654	75.62%
San Diego State	Viejas Arena	12,414	11,934	**12,414**†	**12,414**†	12,115	12,038	11,532	**12,414**†	**12,414**†	12,183	**12,414**†	12,239	**12,414**†	**12,414**†	**12,414**†	**12,414**†	**12,414**†				196,181	12,261	98.77%
San Jose State	Event Center Arena	5,000	2,241	1,322	1,587	1,652	1,546	1,233	2,234	2,871	2,084	3,371†	2,609	2,389	2,917	2,321	2,347					32,724	2,182	43.63%
UNLV	Thomas & Mack Center	17,923	5,039	4,931	5,732	4,589	4,549	6,446	6,093	7,249	5,802	5,102	4,539	8,734†	5,762	4,783	5,831	5,747				80,383	5,742	31.99%
Utah State	Smith Spectrum	10,270	7,430	6,875	6,549	5,980	6,777	6,047	7,000	6,933	7,890	7,611	8,895†	8,851	8,765	6,935	9,157	9,963†				121,658	7,604	74.03%
Wyoming	Arena-Auditorium	11,612	4,464	4,498	4,782	4,472	3,953	4,604	4,823	4,346	4,178	6,968†	3,950	3,717	4,719	3,894	4,520					67,888	4,526	38.97%
Total		11,602																				1,133,368	6,551	56.46%

Bold – At or exceed capacity
†Season high
