= Maggie Doogan =

American basketball player (born 2004)

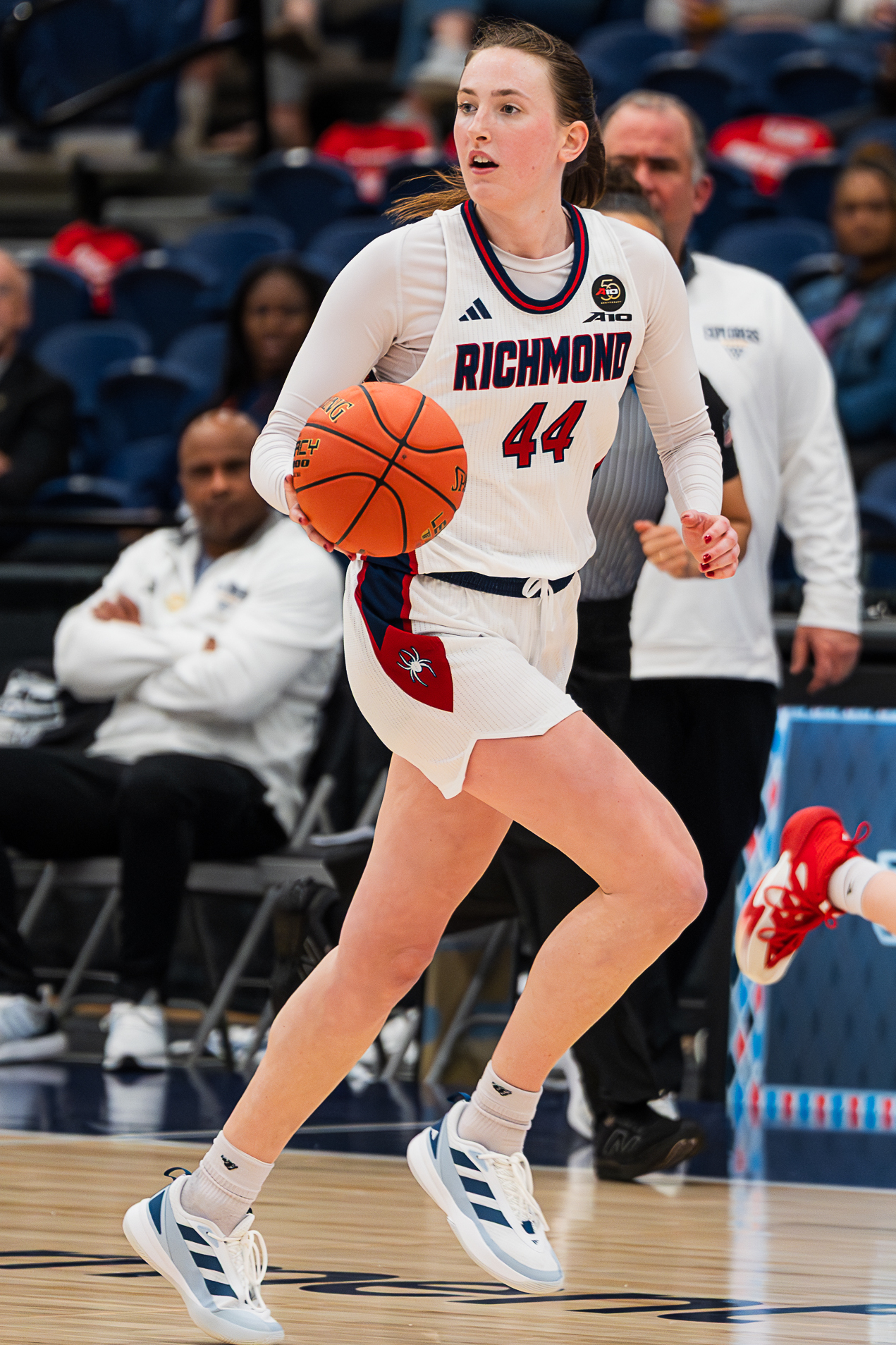
- Doogan in 2026

Universitario de Ferrol
- Position: Forward
- League: Liga Femenina de Baloncesto

Personal information
- Born: March 22, 2004 (age 22) Broomall, Pennsylvania, U.S.
- Listed height: 6 ft 2 in (1.88 m)

Career information
- High school: Cardinal O'Hara (Springfield, Pennsylvania)
- College: Richmond (2022–2026)
- WNBA draft: 2026: undrafted
- Playing career: 2026–present

Career history
- 2026–present: Universitario de Ferrol

Career highlights
- 2× Atlantic 10 Player of the Year (2025–2026); 3× First-team All-Atlantic 10 (2024–2026); Third-team All-Atlantic 10 (2023); Atlantic 10 All-Rookie team (2023)
- Stats at WNBA.com
- Stats at Basketball Reference

Margaret Doogan (born March 22, 2004) is an American professional basketball player for Universitario de Ferrol of the Liga Femenina de Baloncesto. She played college basketball for the Richmond Spiders of the Atlantic 10 Conference. She was a two-time Atlantic 10 Player of the Year in 2025 and 2026 and led the Spiders to three consecutive NCAA tournament appearances.

== Early life ==
Doogan was born on March 22, 2004, in Broomall, Pennsylvania. Her mother, Chrissie, was an assistant women's basketball coach at La Salle University. Doogan grew up around the team. She joined the Comets AAU team in the Greater Philadelphia area in the fifth grade, and remained with the team through high school. Doogan played other sports in her youth too, such as soccer, volleyball, and lacrosse, because her mother "always said she didn’t have to play basketball".

I kind of grew up in La Salle gym because that’s where [my mom] coached. So, I would always sit and watch their practices and hang out with the team. I think that’s where my love of basketball kind of grew.

— Doogan in 2022

== High school career ==
Doogan attended Cardinal O'Hara High School in Springfield, Pennsylvania, where she played four years of basketball under her mom as head coach. She played sparingly as a freshman, averaging three points and three rebounds per game, because, according to her mother, "[s]he had a good basketball IQ, and her body just hadn’t caught up to her at that time." Doogan received more playing time as a sophomore and helped O'Hara reach the state championship quarterfinals, though the rest of the tournament was cancelled due to the COVID-19 pandemic. She later credited the uncertainty of the pandemic for motivating her to want to keep playing, dedicating herself to staying in shape, practicing with her father, and studying film.

In her final two years of high school, Doogan helped O'Hara win back-to-back Pennsylvania Interscholastic Athletic Association (PIAA) state championships, collecting Delaware County Daily Times Player of the Year and first-team all-state honors in both seasons. As a junior, she averaged 14.5 points and seven rebounds per game. As a senior, Doogan averaged 16 points, seven rebounds and three assists per game, was named the Pennsylvania Sports Writers Class 5A Player of the Year, as well as a nominee for the McDonald's All-American Game. In addition to basketball, she lettered in volleyball.

=== Recruiting ===
On July 18, 2021, Doogan verbally committed to playing college basketball at the University of Richmond, having also made visits to Pittsburgh, Rider, Saint Joseph's, and her mother's alma mater, La Salle. "When I visited the campus, it was just a good feeling,” she said. “The campus is beautiful, the coaches are great, the players are great. And, I think they are on the rise too." Doogan signed a National Letter of Intent with the Spiders in November.

== College career ==
Doogan played college basketball for the Richmond Spiders of the Atlantic 10 Conference from 2022 to 2026.

As a freshman in 2022–23, Doogan averaged 11.5 points, six rebounds, and 1.7 assists per game and earned third-team all-Atlantic 10 honors, in addition to conference all-freshman honors. After missing all of December with a hand injury, she quickly earned a starting spot after she tallied 13 points and 13 rebounds off the bench in a 49–75 loss to Rhode Island on January 18, 2023. In her first career start three days later, Doogan recorded 18 points and 12 rebounds in a 73–58 win over George Mason. On January 29, she scored a season-high 28 points to go with six rebounds, five assists, and three blocks in a 94–90 overtime win over Saint Joseph's, earning back-to-back Atlantic 10 Rookie of the Week honors for her performances. The Philadelphia Inquirer described her performance in the nationally televised win over Saint Joseph's as her "breakout game".

As a sophomore in 2023–24, Doogan averaged 15.4 points, 5.7 rebounds, and 2.3 assists per game, leading the Spiders in scoring and garnering first-team all-conference honors. She averaged 20.7 points per game at the Vibrant Thanksgiving Classic in November as the Spiders went 3–0; she was named the tournament MVP and USBWA national player of the week. On December 10, 2023, Doogan scored a season-high 28 points in an 80–77 overtime win over Appalachian State. She helped the Spiders go on to win their first-ever Atlantic 10 regular season and tournament titles, earning all-tournament accolades in the latter.

As a junior in 2024–25, Doogan averaged 17.0 points, 7.1 rebounds, and 3.8 assists per game, and was named the Atlantic 10 Player of the Year. She scored a season-high 37 points in an 88–86 win over George Mason on January 8, 2025. The following month, Doogan scored 26 and 33 points in consecutive wins over George Washington and VCU, respectively, and was named the player of the week by both Mid-Major Madness and World Exposure Report. After losing in semifinals of the Atlantic 10 tournament, Richmond received an at-large bid to the NCAA tournament. In the first round, Doogan recorded 30 points, 15 rebounds, and six assists in a 74–49 win over Georgia Tech. She then posted 27 points, seven assists, and six rebounds in a 67–84 loss to top-seeded UCLA in the second round.

Ahead of her senior senior in 2025–26, Doogan rejected multiple offers from Power conference programs to transfer out of Richmond. She said: "Honestly, it’s home. And I wouldn’t want to spend my last year anywhere else." In her final season, Doogan averaged 21.1 points, 7.9 rebounds, and 3.9 assists per game. She repeated as the A-10 Player of the Year after leading the conference in scoring while ranking second in rebounds and assists, becoming the first player to win a player of the year award in consecutive years since Pam Bryant in 1989 and 1990. Doogan also received All-America honorable mention from the AP, USBWA, and WBCA. In her season debut on November 4, 2025, she tallied 28 points and 13 rebounds in an 83–49 win over Mount St. Mary's, going on to earn her first of eight conference player of the week awards that season. On November 18, Doogan posted a near triple-double with 31 points, 14 rebounds, and nine assists in a 72–57 win over Temple, which she followed up by scoring 17 points and grabbing 14 rebounds in a 69–56 win over Navy to earn USBWA national player of the week honors. She recorded 48 points and 13 rebounds in a triple-overtime win over Davidson on January 10, 2026, setting both the program and conference single-game scoring records, and again earning USBWA national player of the week honors. Doogan won the award for a third time in mid-February after leading Richmond to conference wins over St. Bonaventure and Davidson, notably scoring her 2,000th career point in the latter. In her final regular season game, she scored 35 points in a 72–61 win at Saint Joseph's in front of her friends and family from her native Greater Philadelphia area. The Spiders went on to make their third straight appearance in the NCAA tournament, losing to Nebraska in the First Four; Doogan had 24 points and 10 rebounds in her final career game.

Doogan finished second all-time in program history with 2,138 points (only behind Karen Elsner), to go with 871 rebounds, 391 assists, 140 blocks, and 123 steals. Her college head coach, Aaron Roussell, described her as "probably one of the best players, if not the best player in history, and one of the best players in A-10 history".

== Professional career ==
Doogan was generally projected as a second-round pick in the 2026 WNBA draft. However, she was not selected. On April 15, 2026, it was announced that Doogan signed a training camp contract with the Phoenix Mercury. She played in two preseason games for the Mercury before she was waived on April 30.

In May 2026, Doogan signed with Universitario de Ferrol of the Liga Femenina de Baloncesto in Spain, picking the team over an offer from an Italian club.

== National team career ==
In June 2025, Doogan was invited to Team USA trials in Colorado Springs, Colorado, to compete for a spot on the final roster for the 2025 FIBA Women's AmeriCup. She was the only invitee from a mid-major program.

== Personal life ==
Doogan comes from an athletic family. Her grandfather, Joe Donahue, and uncle, Jim Donahue, played basketball at Devon Prep in Pennsylvania, with each earning induction into the school's Wall of Fame. Her mother, Chrissie (née Donahue) Doogan, also a two-time two-time Delaware County Daily Times Girls Basketball Player of the Year at Cardinal O'Hara High School, just like Maggie. She went on to score 1,818 points at La Salle, earning induction into the program's hall of fame, before going on to serve as an assistant coach at La Salle and Cornell.

Doogan is oldest of four children in her family. Her younger brother, John, plays baseball and basketball at Devon Prep, while her younger sister, Catie, plays basketball at O'Hara under Chrissie. While at Richmond, Doogan was roommates with teammate Rachel Ullstrom for all four years. Her grandparents made the four-hour drive to most home games to watch her play.
