= 2025–26 Richmond Spiders women's basketball team =

Intercollegiate basketball season

2025–26 Richmond Spiders women's basketball

NCAA tournament, First Four
- Conference: Atlantic 10 Conference
- Record: 26–8 (15–3 A-10)
- Head coach: Aaron Roussell (7th season)
- Associate head coach: Jeanine Radice
- Assistant coaches: Brittany Pinkney; Ariel Stephenson; Alex Louin
- Home arena: Robins Center

2025–26 Atlantic 10 women's basketball standings
	Conf.				Overall
Team	W		L	PCT	W		L	PCT
Rhode Island †	16	–	2	.889	28	–	5	.848
George Mason	16	–	2	.889	23	–	10	.697
Richmond	15	–	3	.833	26	–	8	.765
Davidson	12	–	6	.667	21	–	12	.636
Saint Joseph's	10	–	8	.556	20	–	11	.645
La Salle	10	–	8	.556	19	–	14	.576
Dayton	9	–	9	.500	17	–	14	.548
Loyola Chicago	9	–	9	.500	16	–	18	.471
St. Bonaventure	7	–	11	.389	17	–	16	.515
George Washington	7	–	11	.389	18	–	18	.500
Saint Louis	5	–	13	.278	12	–	21	.364
Duquesne	4	–	14	.222	12	–	19	.387
VCU	4	–	14	.222	8	–	23	.258
Fordham	2	–	16	.111	10	–	20	.333
† 2026 A10 tournament winner

The 2025–26 Richmond Spiders women's basketball team represented the University of Richmond during the 2025–26 NCAA Division I women's basketball season. The Spiders, led by seventh-year head coach Aaron Roussell, played their home games at the Robins Center and were members of the Atlantic 10 Conference (A-10).

== Previous season ==
The Spiders finished the 2024–25 season with an overall record of 28–7, including 17–1 in regular-season A-10 play, to win the outright regular-season championship for the second straight season. In the A-10 women's tournament, they earned the No. 1 seed and received first- and second-round byes before defeating No. 9 seed Duquesne in the quarterfinals and falling to No. 4 seed Saint Joseph's in the semifinals. Despite failing to secure an automatic bid through the A-10 tournament, the Spiders earned an at-large bid to the NCAA tournament.

The Spiders earned an 8-seed in the NCAA tournament, where they defeated 9-seed Georgia Tech in the first round in Los Angeles, California before falling to 1-seed UCLA in the second round.

== Preseason ==
In a preseason poll of league head coaches, Richmond was voted to repeat as champion of the Atlantic 10 Conference for a third straight season in 2025–26. Forward Maggie Doogan, the reigning A-10 Player of the Year, and guard Rachel Ullstrom were selected first-team preseason all-conference, while guard Ally Sweeney was named to the second team and transfer forward Tierra Simon was named to the third team.

Atlantic 10 Preseason Poll
Place	Team	Votes
1	Richmond	188 (9)
2	George Mason	185 (4)
3	Davidson	167 (1)
4	Rhode Island	137
5	Dayton	123
6	Saint Joseph's	120
7	VCU	110
8	Duquesne	95
9	Saint Louis	86
10	George Washington	75
11	Fordham	63
12	La Salle	56
13	Loyola Chicago	43
14	St. Bonaventure	22
(#) first-place votes

=== Preseason All-A10 Teams ===
Preseason All-A10 Team
Team	Player	Year	Position
First	Maggie Doogan	Senior	Forward
First	Rachel Ullstrom	Senior	Guard
Second	Ally Sweeney	Junior	Guard

The Spiders were ranked No. 19 in the ESPN Preseason Top 25 and tied at No. 24 in the AP Preseason Poll.

== Roster ==
2025–26 Richmond Spiders women's basketball team
Players
Coaches

Pos.	#	Name	Height	Year	Previous school	Hometown
F	0	Tierra Simon	6 ft 1 in (1.85 m)	GS	Heights High School; Saint Louis	Houston, TX
G	1	Rayne Wright	6 ft 0 in (1.83 m)	Fr	Manchester High School	Midlothian, VA
G	3	Alicia Newell	5 ft 9 in (1.75 m)	So	Elizabeth Seton High School	Clinton, MD
G	4	Ava Persichetti	5 ft 10 in (1.78 m)	Fr	River Valley High School	Blairsville, PA
F	8	Jada Green	6 ft 1 in (1.85 m)	RS Sr	St. Thomas Aquinas High School	Fort Lauderdale, FL
G	12	Aneisha Scott	5 ft 5 in (1.65 m)	Fr	DeLaSalle High School	Minneapolis, MN
F	13	Sam Dewey	6 ft 2 in (1.88 m)	Sr	Brooks School; Illinois	Melrose, MA
G	14	Ally Sweeney	5 ft 6 in (1.68 m)	Jr	Sparta High School	Sparta, NJ
G	15	Payton Richard	6 ft 0 in (1.83 m)	So	Rivers School	Bolton, MA
F	21	Shaneka Campbell	6 ft 2 in (1.88 m)	Fr	Harry S. Truman High School	The Bronx, NY
G	22	Rachel Ullstrom	6 ft 1 in (1.85 m)	Sr	Marianapolis Preparatory School	Auburn, MA
F	24	Annika Manthy	6 ft 3 in (1.91 m)	So	John Hersey High School	Arlington Heights, IL
F	25	Skylah Travis	6 ft 1 in (1.85 m)	GS	Weldon High School; Louisiana	Weldon, NC
F	44	Maggie Doogan	6 ft 2 in (1.88 m)	Sr	Cardinal O'Hara High School	Broomall, PA

Head coach

- Aaron Roussell (Iowa)

Assistant coach(es)

- Jeanine Radice (Fordham)
- Brittany Pinkney (VCU)
- Ariel Stephenson (Wake Forest)
- Alex Louin (Villanova)

Legend

- (C) Team captain
- (S) Suspended
- (I) Ineligible
- (W) Walk-on
- Injured
- Current redshirt

Roster
Last update: October 15, 2025

== Schedule ==
Richmond's 2025–26 non-conference schedule featured 13 games, including a pair of games in the Cancun Classic at the end of November and another pair in the 4 Tha Culture Holiday Classic in December.

In the Atlantic 10 portion of the schedule, Richmond played a total of 18 games, including both home and away games against Davidson, Rhode Island, George Mason, St. Bonaventure and VCU. In addition, Richmond hosted Loyola Chicago, Duquesne, La Salle and Fordham, while the Spiders traveled to Saint Louis, Dayton, George Washington and Saint Joseph's.

Date time, TV	Rank^{#}	Opponent^{#}	Result	Record	High points	High rebounds	High assists	Site (attendance) city, state
Regular season
November 4, 2025*; 6:00 p.m., ESPN+	No. 24т	Mount St. Mary's	W 83–49	1–0	28 – Doogan	13 – Doogan	6 – Doogan	Robins Center (1,251); Richmond, VA
November 7, 2025*; 8:00 p.m., SECN+	No. 24т	at No. 4 Texas	L 56–85	1–1	22 – Doogan	7 – Doogan	5 – Doogan	Moody Center (8,747); Austin, TX
November 12, 2025*; 7:00 p.m., FloSports		at William & Mary	W 84–58	2–1	25 – Doogan	12 – Doogan	8 – Doogan	Kaplan Arena (996); Williamsburg, VA
November 15, 2025*; 7:00 p.m., ESPN+		at Columbia	W 77–67	3–1	16 – Tied	9 – Doogan	9 – Sweeney	Levien Gymnasium (1,542); New York, NY
November 18, 2025*; 6:00 p.m., ESPN+		Temple	W 72–57	4–1	31 – Doogan	14 – Doogan	9 – Doogan	Robins Center (1,233); Richmond, VA
November 23, 2025*; 2:00 p.m., ESPN+		Navy	W 69–56	5–1	17 – Doogan	14 – Doogan	8 – Sweeney	Robins Center (2,317); Richmond, VA
November 27, 2025*; 9:00 p.m., FloSports		vs. No. 8 TCU; Cancun Challenge Yucatan Tournament	L 52–68	5–2	23 – Doogan	7 – Doogan	6 – Simon	Hard Rock Hotel Riviera Maya (175); Riviera Maya, Mexico
November 28, 2025*; 9:00 p.m., FloSports		vs. Green Bay; Cancun Challenge Yucatan Tournament	W 76–59	6–2	25 – Doogan	12 – Ullstrom	4 – Simon	Hard Rock Hotel Riviera Maya; Riviera Maya, Mexico
December 3, 2025; 6:00 p.m., ESPN+		Loyola Chicago	W 69–46	7–2 (1–0)	20 – Doogan	9 – Doogan	5 – Tied	Robins Center (1,335); Richmond, VA
December 7, 2025*; 2:00 p.m., ESPN+		Fairfield	L 73–93	7–3	24 – Doogan	7 – Ullstrom	7 – Doogan	Robins Center (1,343); Richmond, VA
December 13, 2025*; 2:00 p.m., ESPN+		at Liberty	W 76–61	8–3	24 – Doogan	7 – Doogan	7 – Doogan	Liberty Arena (1,011); Lynchburg, VA
December 16, 2025*; 11:00 a.m., ESPN+		Bethune–Cookman	W 81–45	9–3	26 – Doogan	11 – Doogan	6 – Doogan	Robins Center (2,590); Richmond, VA
December 20, 2025*; 1:00 p.m., ESPN+		vs. Alabama A&M; 4 Tha Culture Holiday Classic	W 72–58	10–3	20 – Ullstrom	7 – Tied	6 – Tied	Henrico Sports & Events Center; Henrico, VA
December 21, 2025*; 2:30 p.m., ESPN+		vs. Penn State; 4 Tha Culture Holiday Classic	W 70–54	11–3	30 – Doogan	14 – Ullstrom	6 – Sweeney	Henrico Sports & Events Center (703); Henrico, VA
December 30, 2025; 6:00 p.m., ESPN+		at Rhode Island	L 61–73	11–4 (1–1)	26 – Doogan	7 – Doogan	3 – Tied	Ryan Center (1,146); Kingston, RI
January 3, 2026; 3:00 p.m., ESPN+		at St. Bonaventure	W 80–60	12–4 (2–1)	18 – Doogan	7 – Tied	6 – Tied	Reilly Center (427); St. Bonaventure, NY
January 7, 2026; 6:00 p.m., ESPN+		Fordham	W 84–65	13–4 (3–1)	27 – Ullstrom	10 – Doogan	6 – Doogan	Robins Center (1,204); Richmond, VA
January 10, 2026; 6:00 p.m., ESPN+		Davidson	W 91–84 ^{3OT}	14–4 (4–1)	48 – Doogan	13 – Doogan	5 – Simon	Robins Center (2,207); Richmond, VA
January 14, 2026; 7:00 p.m., ESPN+		at Dayton	W 85–67	15–5 (5–1)	26 – Ullstrom	7 – Doogan	13 – Sweeney	UD Arena (2,437); Dayton, OH
January 18, 2026 noon, CBSSN		VCU; Capital City Classic	W 77–47	16–4 (6–1)	20 – Ullstrom	7 – Doogan	6 – Sweeney	Robins Center (5,224); Richmond, VA
January 25, 2026; 11:00 a.m., ESPNU		at George Mason	Postponed due to inclement weather					EagleBank Arena; Fairfax, VA
January 28, 2026; 6:00 p.m., ESPN+		Duquesne	W 86–55	17–4 (7–1)	19 – Ullstrom	5 – Doogan	5 – Sweeney	Robins Center (1,241); Richmond, VA
February 1, 2026 noon, ESPNU		at VCU	W 77–65	18–4 (8–1)	27 – Sweeney	10 – Doogan	3 – Newell	Siegel Center (5,373); Richmond VA
February 4, 2026; 8:00 p.m., ESPN+		at Saint Louis	W 92–44	19–4 (9–1)	16 – Tied	10 – Simon	6 – Sweeney	Chaifetz Arena (450); St. Louis, MO
February 7, 2026; 6:00 p.m., ESPN+/MASN2		George Mason	W 71–57	20–4 (10–1)	20 – Doogan	6 – Tied	4 – Sweeney	Robins Center (2,148); Richmond, VA
February 11, 2026; 6:00 p.m., ESPN+		St. Bonaventure	W 75–52	21–4 (11–1)	23 – Doogan	11 – Doogan	7 – Doogan	Robins Center (1,207); Richmond, VA
February 14, 2026; 1:00 p.m., ESPN+		at Davidson	W 65–43	22–4 (12–1)	26 – Doogan	8 – Ullstrom	7 – Sweeney	John M. Belk Arena (1,348); Davidson, NC
February 16, 2026; 4:00 p.m., ESPN+		at George Mason; Rescheduled from January 25	L 37–46	22–5 (12–2)	9 – Ullstrom	8 – Doogan	4 – Sweeney	EagleBank Arena (1,386); Fairfax, VA
February 18, 2026; 6:00 p.m., ESPN+		at George Washington	L 54–57 ^{OT}	22–6 (12–3)	14 – Doogan	6 – Tied	2 – Doogan	Charles E. Smith Center (525); Washington, D.C.
February 22, 2026; 2:00 p.m., ESPN+		La Salle	W 92–58	23–6 (13–3)	20 – Scott	7 – Ullstrom	5 – Sweeney	Robins Center (2,268); Richmond, VA
February 25, 2026; 6:00 p.m., ESPN+		Rhode Island	W 72–46	24–6 (14–3)	20 – Newell	8 – Doogan	7 – Sweeney	Robins Center (1,944); Richmond, VA
February 28, 2026; 2:00 p.m., ESPN+		at Saint Joseph's	W 72–61	25–6 (15–3)	35 – Doogan	5 – Tied	4 – Tied	Hagan Arena (1,604); Philadelphia, PA
Atlantic 10 tournament
March 6, 2026; 7:30 p.m., CNBC	(3)	vs. (6) La Salle; Quarterfinals	W 70–51	26–6	13 – Doogan	8 – Doogan	5 – Doogan	Henrico Sports & Events Center (2,618); Henrico, VA
March 7, 2026; 1:30 p.m., CBSSN	(3)	vs. (2) George Mason; Semifinals	L 45–60	26–7	10 – Tied	8 – Doogan	3 – Sweeney	Henrico Sports & Events Center (2,673); Henrico, VA
NCAA tournament
March 18, 2026*; 7:00 p.m., ESPN2	(11 S2)	vs. (11 S2) Nebraska; First Four	L 56–75	26–8	24 – Doogan	10 – Doogan	5 – Sweeney	Cameron Indoor Stadium (730); Durham, NC
*Non-conference game. ^{#}Rankings from AP poll. (#) Tournament seedings in parentheses. S2=Sacramento 2. All times are in Eastern.

== Rankings ==
Ranking movements Legend: ██ Increase in ranking ██ Decrease in ranking — = Not ranked RV = Received votes т = Tied with team above or below
	Week																				
Poll	Pre	1	2	3	4	5	6	7	8	9	10	11	12	13	14	15	16	17	18	19	Final
AP	24т	RV	RV	RV	RV	—	—	—	—*	—	—	—	—	RV	RV	RV	—	—	—	—	—
Coaches	RV	RV	RV	RV	RV	—	—	—	—	—	—	—	—	RV	RV	RV	—	—	—	—	—

*AP did not release a week 8 poll.
