= Atlantic 10 women's basketball tournament =

- Conference basketball championship
- Sport: Basketball
- Conference: Atlantic 10 Conference
- Number of teams: 14
- Format: Single-elimination tournament
- Current stadium: Henrico Sports & Events Center
- Current location: Henrico, Virginia
- Played: 1983–present
- Last contest: 2025
- Current champion: Rhode Island (1)
- Most championships: George Washington (7)
- Official website: Atlantic 10 Women's Basketball

The Atlantic 10 women's basketball tournament is the conference championship tournament in women's basketball for the Atlantic 10 Conference (A-10). It is a single-elimination tournament involving all 14 league schools, and seeding is based on regular-season records with head-to-head match-up as a tie-breaker. The winner receives the conference's automatic bid to the NCAA women's basketball tournament.

The top nine teams in the conference receive byes in the first round, while #12 plays #13, #11 plays #14, and #10 plays #15. The top four teams receive a "double-bye" into the quarterfinals, while #5 plays the winner of #12/#13, #6 plays the winner of #11/#14, #7 plays the winner of #10/#15, and #8 plays #9. The winners of the second-round games move on to face one of the top four seeds in the format of a normal eight-team bracket: #1 vs. #8 or #9; #2 vs. #7. #10, or #15; #3 vs #6, #11 or #14; and #4 vs #5, #12 or #13.

The tournament has been held since 1983.

== Champions ==
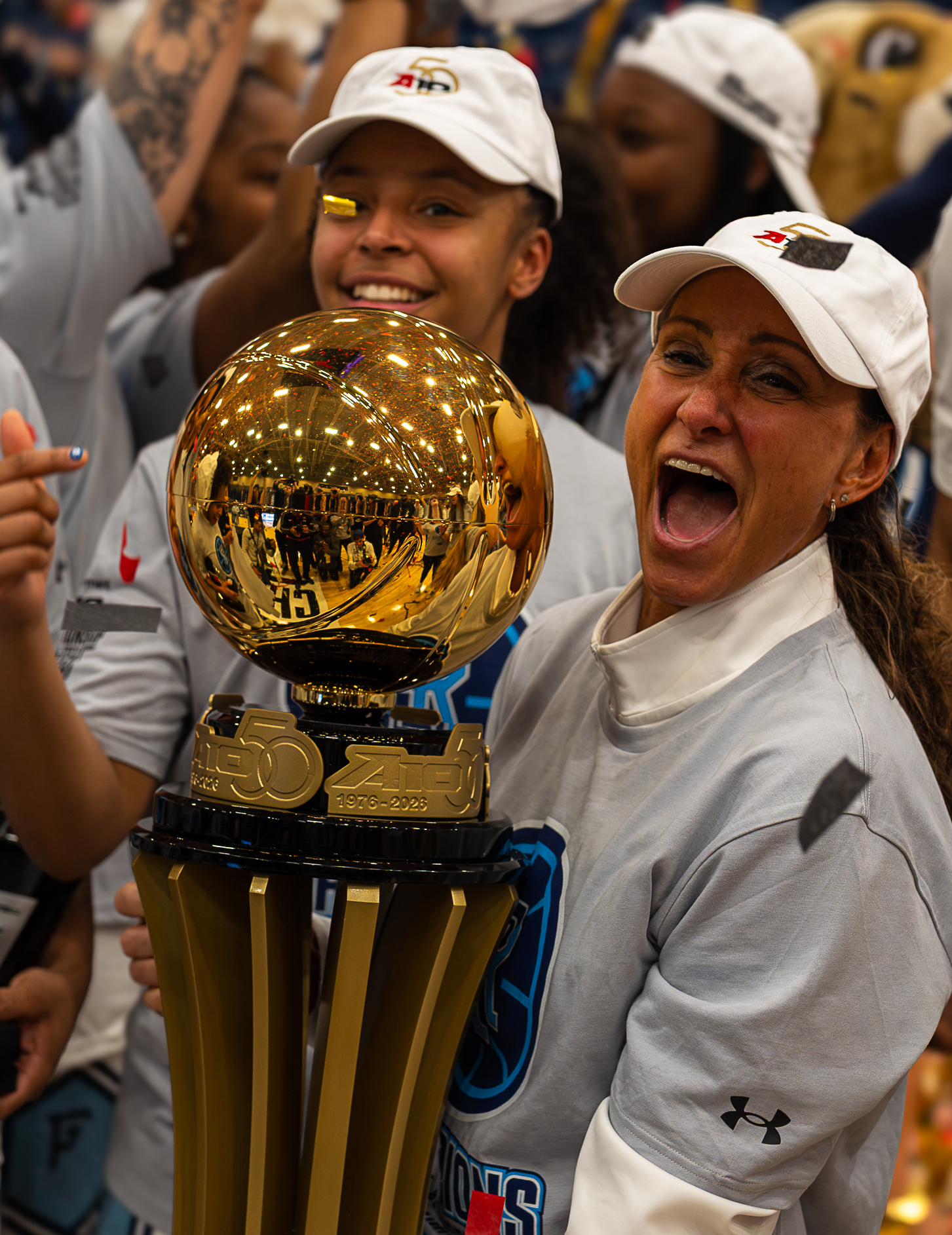
A10 Championship Trophy held by Rhode Island Coach Tammi Reiss in 2026

Year	Champion	Score	Runner-up	Venue
1983	Penn State (1)	77–74	Rutgers	Louis Brown Athletic Center, Piscataway, New Jersey
1984	Penn State (2)	99–64	Rhode Island	Rec Hall, University Park, Pennsylvania
1985	Penn State (3)	96–59	Temple	Alumni Memorial Fieldhouse, Philadelphia, Pennsylvania
1986	Penn State (4)	84–69	Rutgers	WVU Coliseum, Morgantown, West Virginia
1987	Rutgers (1)	93–48	Saint Joseph's	Louis Brown Athletic Center, Piscataway, New Jersey
1988	Rutgers (2)	64–62	Saint Joseph's	Louis Brown Athletic Center, Piscataway, New Jersey
1989	West Virginia (1)	63–54	Temple	Louis Brown Athletic Center, Piscataway, New Jersey
1990	Penn State (5)	84–60	Saint Joseph's	Rec Hall, University Park, Pennsylvania
1991	Penn State (6)	78–63	Saint Joseph's	Alumni Memorial Fieldhouse, Philadelphia, Pennsylvania
1992	George Washington (1)	62–57	Rutgers	Louis Brown Athletic Center, Piscataway, New Jersey
1993	Rutgers (3)	59–51	Saint Joseph's	Charles E. Smith Athletic Center, Washington, D.C.
1994	Rutgers (4)	79–71	George Washington	Alumni Memorial Fieldhouse, Philadelphia, Pennsylvania
1995	George Washington (2)	82–59	Rutgers	Alumni Memorial Fieldhouse, Philadelphia, Pennsylvania
1996	George Washington (3)	73–68	La Salle	Cassell Coliseum, Blacksburg, Virginia
1997	Saint Joseph's (1)	59–56	George Washington	Charles E. Smith Athletic Center, Washington, D.C.
1998	Virginia Tech (1)	66–64 (OT)	UMass	William D. Mullins Memorial Center, Amherst, Massachusetts
1999	Saint Joseph's (2)	85–73	Xavier	The Apollo of Temple, Philadelphia, Pennsylvania
2000	Xavier (1)	80–66	George Washington	Liacouras Center, Philadelphia, Pennsylvania
2001	Xavier (2)	81–56	George Washington	Liacouras Center, Philadelphia, Pennsylvania
2002	Temple (1)	63–58	Saint Joseph's	Liacouras Center, Philadelphia, Pennsylvania
2003	George Washington (4)	56–49	Rhode Island	Charles E. Smith Athletic Center, Washington, D.C.
2004	Temple (2)	53–48	Saint Joseph's	Alumni Memorial Fieldhouse, Philadelphia, Pennsylvania
2005	Temple (3)	70–62	George Washington	Charles E. Smith Athletic Center, Washington, D.C.
2006	Temple (4)	59–54	George Washington	Alumni Memorial Fieldhouse, Philadelphia, Pennsylvania
2007	Xavier (3)	65–59	Saint Joseph's	Cintas Center, Cincinnati, Ohio
2008	Xavier (4)	47–42	Temple	Alumni Memorial Fieldhouse, Philadelphia, Pennsylvania
2009	Charlotte (1)	59–54	Richmond	Dale F. Halton Arena, Charlotte, North Carolina
2010	Xavier (5)	57–55 (OT)	Temple	The Show Place Arena, Upper Marlboro, Maryland
2011	Xavier (6)	67–60	Dayton	Tsongas Center, Lowell, Massachusetts
2012	Dayton (1)	56–53	St. Bonaventure	Hagan Arena, Philadelphia, Pennsylvania
2013	Saint Joseph's (3)	47–46	Fordham	Barclays Center, Brooklyn, New York
2014	Fordham (1)	63–51	Dayton	Richmond Coliseum, Richmond, Virginia
2015	George Washington (5)	75–62	Dayton	Richmond Coliseum, Richmond, Virginia
2016	George Washington (6)	63–60	Duquesne	Richmond Coliseum, Richmond, Virginia
2017	Dayton (2)	70–56	Duquesne	Richmond Coliseum, Richmond, Virginia
2018	George Washington (7)	65–49	Saint Joseph's	Richmond Coliseum, Richmond, Virginia
2019	Fordham (2)	62–47	VCU	Palumbo Center, Pittsburgh, Pennsylvania
2020	Dayton (3)	52–48	VCU	UD Arena, Dayton, Ohio
2021	VCU (1)	81–69	UMass	Siegel Center, Richmond, Virginia
2022	UMass (1)	62–56	Dayton	Chase Fieldhouse, Wilmington, Delaware
2023	Saint Louis (1)	91–85	UMass	Chase Fieldhouse, Wilmington, Delaware
2024	Richmond (1)	65–51	Rhode Island	Henrico Sports & Events Center, Henrico, Virginia
2025	George Mason (1)	73–58	Saint Joseph's	Henrico Sports & Events Center, Henrico, Virginia
2026	Rhode Island (1)	53–51	George Mason	Henrico Sports & Events Center, Henrico, Virginia
2027				Henrico Sports & Events Center, Henrico, Virginia
2028				Henrico Sports & Events Center, Henrico, Virginia
2029				Henrico Sports & Events Center, Henrico, Virginia

== Championships by School ==
School	Championships	Years
George Washington	7	1992, 1995, 1996, 2003, 2015, 2016, 2018
Xavier	6	2000, 2001, 2007, 2008, 2010, 2011
Penn State	6	1983, 1984, 1985, 1986, 1990, 1991
Rutgers	4	1987, 1988, 1993, 1994
Temple	4	2002, 2004, 2005, 2006
Saint Joseph's	3	1997, 1999, 2013
Dayton	3	2012, 2017, 2020
Fordham	2	2014, 2019
West Virginia	1	1989
Virginia Tech	1	1998
Charlotte	1	2009
VCU	1	2021
UMass	1	2022
Saint Louis	1	2023
Richmond	1	2024
George Mason	1	2025
Rhode Island	1	2026

- Schools highlighted in pink are former members of the Atlantic 10
- Duquesne, Davidson, La Salle, Loyola Chicago and St. Bonaventure have not yet won a tournament.
- Butler did not win the 2013 tournament in its only season as a member of the Atlantic 10.

== See also ==
- Atlantic 10 men's basketball tournament
