= Rebecca Tillett =

American college basketball coach

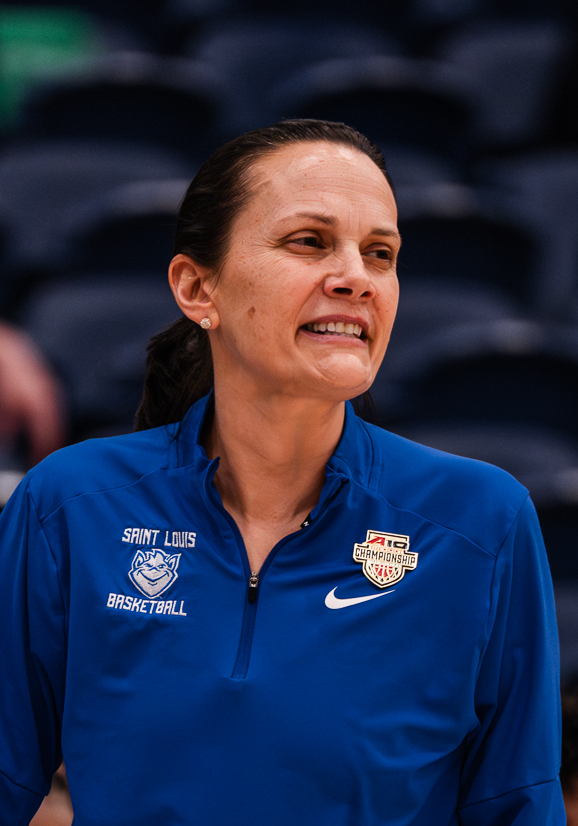
- Tillett at the 2026 Atlantic 10 Women's Basketball Championship Tournament at the Henrico Sports & Events Center

Current position
- Title: Head coach
- Team: Saint Louis
- Conference: Atlantic 10
- Record: 66–76 (.465)

Coaching career (HC unless noted)
- 2013–2014: IUP (asst.)
- 2014–2018: Navy (asst.)
- 2018–2022: Longwood
- 2022–present: Saint Louis

Head coaching record
- Overall: 117–144 (.448)

Accomplishments and honors

Championships
- Big South regular season (2022); Big South tournament (2022); Atlantic 10 tournament (2023); WNIT Championship (2024)

Rebecca Tillett is an American college basketball coach who is currently serving as the head coach of the Saint Louis University women's basketball team. She was previously the coach of the Longwood University women's basketball team. She led both Longwood and Saint Louis to their first appearances in the NCAA Division I women's basketball tournament, in 2022 and 2023 respectively.

== Career ==
Tillett graduated from the College of William & Mary in 1999; she was captain of the women's basketball team during her senior year. She began her career coaching high school basketball in Virginia, spending time at Jamestown High School, Osbourn Park High School, and Forest Park High School. In 2013, she took a position as an assistant coach of the Indiana University of Pennsylvania women's basketball team. After one season at IUP, she became an assistant coach at Navy, where she remained for the next four seasons.

In 2018, Tillett became the head coach of the Longwood women's basketball team, her first collegiate head coaching role. She coached at Longwood for four seasons. In the 2021–22 season, she led the team to a 22–12 record and won the Big South Conference tournament, granting Longwood its first appearance in the NCAA Division I women's basketball tournament. Longwood defeated Mount St. Mary's in the First Four before losing to NC State in the first round of the main tournament.

Tillett was hired by Saint Louis University to coach their women's basketball team in 2022. In the 2022–23 season, her first year as head coach, Saint Louis won the Atlantic 10 Conference basketball tournament, earning the team its first appearance in the NCAA Division I women's basketball tournament. She is the second coach in NCAA history, after Lisa Bluder, to reach the NCAA Division I women's basketball tournament with different schools in consecutive years.

== Personal life ==
Tillett's parents are both teachers and sports coaches. Her father was a high school basketball and soccer coach, while her mother coached middle school soccer. Her brothers Nate and Daniel are both high school coaches as well, coaching boys' soccer and girls' basketball respectively.

== Head coaching record ==
Record table
Season	Team	Overall	Conference	Standing	Postseason
Longwood (Big South Conference) (2018–2022)
2018–19	Longwood	3–27	2–16	11th	
2019–20	Longwood	12–18	8–12	T-7th	
2020–21	Longwood	14–11	12–6	3rd	
2021–22	Longwood	22–12	15–3	T-1st	NCAA 1st Round
Longwood:		51–68 (.429)			
Saint Louis (Atlantic 10 Conference) (2022–present)
2022–23	Saint Louis	17–18	10–6	T–3rd	NCAA 1st Round
2023–24	Saint Louis	22–18	9–9	7th	WNIT Champions
2024–25	Saint Louis	15–19	7–11	10th	
2025–26	Saint Louis	12–21	5–13	11th	
Saint Louis:		66–76 (.465)			
Total:		117–144 (.448)			
National champion Postseason invitational champion Conference regular season champion Conference regular season and conference tournament champion Division regular season champion Division regular season and conference tournament champion Conference tournament champion
