= La Salle Explorers basketball =

La Salle Explorers basketball may refer to either of the basketball teams that represent La Salle University:

- La Salle Explorers men's basketball
- La Salle Explorers women's basketball
