= 2022–23 Rhode Island Rams women's basketball team =

Intercollegiate basketball season

2022–23 Rhode Island Rams women's basketball

Atlantic 10 regular season champions
- Conference: Atlantic 10 Conference
- Record: 26–7 (14–2 A-10)
- Head coach: Tammi Reiss (4th season)
- Associate head coach: Megan Shoniker
- Home arena: Ryan Center

2022–23 Atlantic 10 women's basketball standings
	Conf.				Overall
Team	W		L	PCT	W		L	PCT
Rhode Island	14	–	2	.875	26	–	7	.788
UMass	14	–	2	.875	27	–	7	.794
Fordham	10	–	6	.625	19	–	13	.594
Saint Louis†	10	–	6	.625	17	–	18	.486
Richmond	8	–	6	.571	21	–	11	.656
Saint Joseph's	9	–	7	.563	20	–	11	.645
George Washington	9	–	7	.563	18	–	13	.581
La Salle	8	–	7	.533	17	–	14	.548
Duquesne	8	–	8	.500	19	–	12	.613
George Mason	8	–	8	.500	16	–	15	.516
Davidson	6	–	8	.429	14	–	16	.467
Dayton	5	–	10	.333	7	–	21	.250
VCU	4	–	12	.250	7	–	22	.241
St. Bonaventure	3	–	13	.188	6	–	26	.188
Loyola Chicago	1	–	15	.063	6	–	24	.200
† 2023 A10 Tournament winner As of March 24, 2023

The 2022–23 Rhode Island Rams women's basketball team represented the University of Rhode Island during the 2022–23 NCAA Division I women's basketball season.

== Roster ==
2022–23 Rhode Island Rams women's basketball team
Players
Coaches

Pos.	#	Name	Height	Year	Previous school	Hometown
G	0	Chantelle Blagrove	5 ft 9 in (1.75 m)	Fr	Niagara Prep	Ajax, Ontario
G	1	Sophie Phillips	6 ft 0 in (1.83 m)	So	Cambridge Central School	Greenwich, N.Y.
C	4	Tenin Magassa	6 ft 5 in (1.96 m)	Jr	Jean Moulin; Dayton	Morsang-Sur-Orge, France
F	11	Hawa Komara	6 ft 0 in (1.83 m)	RS Fr	Alain Fournier School	Toulouse, France
F	13	Anaelle Dutat	6 ft 0 in (1.83 m)	Fr	Lycee Victor Hugo	Cesson, France
F	20	Mayé Touré	6 ft 2 in (1.88 m)	Jr	Lycée Alain Fournier	Athis-Mons, France
G	30	Ines Debroise	5 ft 9 in (1.75 m)	Fr	Insep	Paris, France
C	55	Sophie Sene	6 ft 3 in (1.91 m)	RS So	Lycee Hector Berlioz	Nice, France

Head coach

- Tammi Reiss (Virginia)

Assistant coach(es)

- Megan Shoniker (Rhode Island)
- Adeniyi Amadou (Indiana (PA))
- Takima Keane (Cleveland State)

Legend

- (C) Team captain
- (S) Suspended
- (I) Ineligible
- (W) Walk-on
- Injured
- Current redshirt

Roster
Last update: October 25, 2023

== Schedule ==
Date time, TV	Rank^{#}	Opponent^{#}	Result	Record	Site (attendance) city, state
Non-conference regular season
Nov 7, 2022*; 7:00pm, ESPN+		at Harvard	L 74–88	0–1	Lavietes Pavilion (465); Boston, MA
Nov 11, 2022*; 1:00pm, ESPN+		Dartmouth	W 89–36	1–1	Ryan Center (1,044); Kingston, RI
Nov 14, 2022*; 6:00pm, ESPN+		Providence; Ocean State Cup	W 74–72	2–1	Ryan Center (1,065); Kingston, RI
Nov 22, 2022*; 6:00pm, ESPN+		Coppin State	W 67–60	3–1	Ryan Center (839); Kingston, RI
Nov 26, 2022*; 12:00pm		Southeast Missouri State; UCF Thanksgiving Classic	W 66–49	4–1	Addition Financial Arena (210); Orlando, FL
Nov 27, 2022*; 12:00pm		Samford; UCF Thanksgiving Classic	W 75–63	5–1	Addition Financial Arena (140); Orlando, FL
Dec 1, 2022*; 6:00pm, ESPN+		Buffalo	W 71–56	6–1	Ryan Center (704); Kingston, RI
Dec 4, 2022*; 1:00pm, ESPN+		Maine	W 63–43	7–1	Ryan Center (889); Kingston, RI
Dec 7, 2022*; 11:00 am, ESPN+		Hartford	W 88–34	8–1	Ryan Center (3,800); Kingston, RI
Dec 11, 2022*; 12:00 am		at Quinnipiac	W 63–55	9–1	M&T Bank Arena (515); Hamden, CT
Dec 22, 2022*; 1:00 am, ACCNX		at Wake Forest	L 45–59	9–2	LJVM Coliseum (691); Winston-Salem, NC
Dec 28, 2022*; 2:00 pm, ESPN+		at Princeton	L 54–56	9–3	Jadwin Gymnasium (841); Princeton, NJ
Atlantic 10 regular season
Dec 31, 2022; 1:00pm, ESPN+		Duquesne	W 70–63	10–3 (1–0)	Ryan Center (1,394); Kingston, RI
Jan 4, 2023; 5:00 pm		at UMass	W 75–68	11–3 (2–0)	Mullins Center; Amherst, MA
Jan 8, 2023; 2:00pm, CBSSN		La Salle	W 70–59	12–3 (3–0)	Ryan Center (1,050); Kingston, RI
Jan 12, 2023; 8:00 pm, ESPN+		at Saint Louis	W 76–65	13–3 (4–0)	Chaifetz Arena (346); St. Louis, MO
Jan 15, 2023; 12:00pm, CBSSN		Loyola Chicago	W 63–34	14–3 (5–0)	Ryan Center (1,274); Kingston, RI
Jan 18, 2023; 6:00pm, ESPN+		Richmond	W 75–49	15–3 (6–0)	Ryan Center (904); Kingston, RI
Jan 22, 2023; 1:00pm, ESPN+		at St. Bonaventure	W 74–57	16–3 (7–0)	Reilly Center (185); Olean, NY
Jan 25, 2023; 7:00 pm, ESPN+		at George Mason	W 57–53	17–3 (8–0)	EagleBank Arena (868); Faifax, VA
Feb 1, 2023; 6:00 pm, ESPN+		Saint Joseph's	W 77–73	18–3 (9–0)	Ryan Center (1,415); Kingston, RI
Feb 4, 2023; 7:00 pm, ESPN+		at Davidson	W 67–60	19–3 (10–0)	John M. Belk Arena (706); Davidson, NC
Feb 8, 2023; 6:00 pm, ESPN+		George Washington	W 64–47	20–3 (11–0)	Ryan Center (1,333); Kingston, RI
Feb 12, 2023; 12:00 pm, ESPNU		at VCU	W 63–31	21–3 (12–0)	Siegel Center (846); Richmond, VA
Feb 16, 2023; 6:00 pm, ESPN+		Massachusetts	L 57–78	21–4 (12–1)	Ryan Center (2,422); Kingston, RI
Feb 19, 2023; 2:00pm, ESPN+		at Saint Joseph's	W 58–55	22–4 (13–1)	Hagan Arena; Philadelphia, PA
Feb 22, 2023; 7:00pm, ESPN+		at Fordham	L 73–74	22–5 (13–2)	Rose Hill Gymnasium (523); Bronx, NY
Feb 25, 2023; 1:00 pm, ESPN+		Dayton	W 81–57	23–5 (14–2)	Ryan Center (1,952); Kingston, RI
Atlantic 10 Tournament
Mar 3, 2023; 5:00 pm		(7) George Washington	W 68–56		Chase Fieldhouse (995); Wilmington, DE
Mar 4, 2023; 1:30 pm		(3) Saint Louis	L 56–59		Chase Fieldhouse (1,923); Wilmington, DE
WNIT
Mar 17, 2023; 6:00 pm		Boston University	W 46–40		Ryan Center (1,048); Kingston, RI
Mar 20, 2023; 6:00 pm		Richmond	W 74–64		Ryan Center (1,222); Kingston, RI
Mar 23, 2023; 7:00 pm		Harvard	L 63–74		Lavietes Pavilion (680); Boston, MA
*Non-conference game. ^{#}Rankings from AP Poll. (#) Tournament seedings in parentheses. All times are in Eastern.
