= Aaron Roussell =

American basketball coach

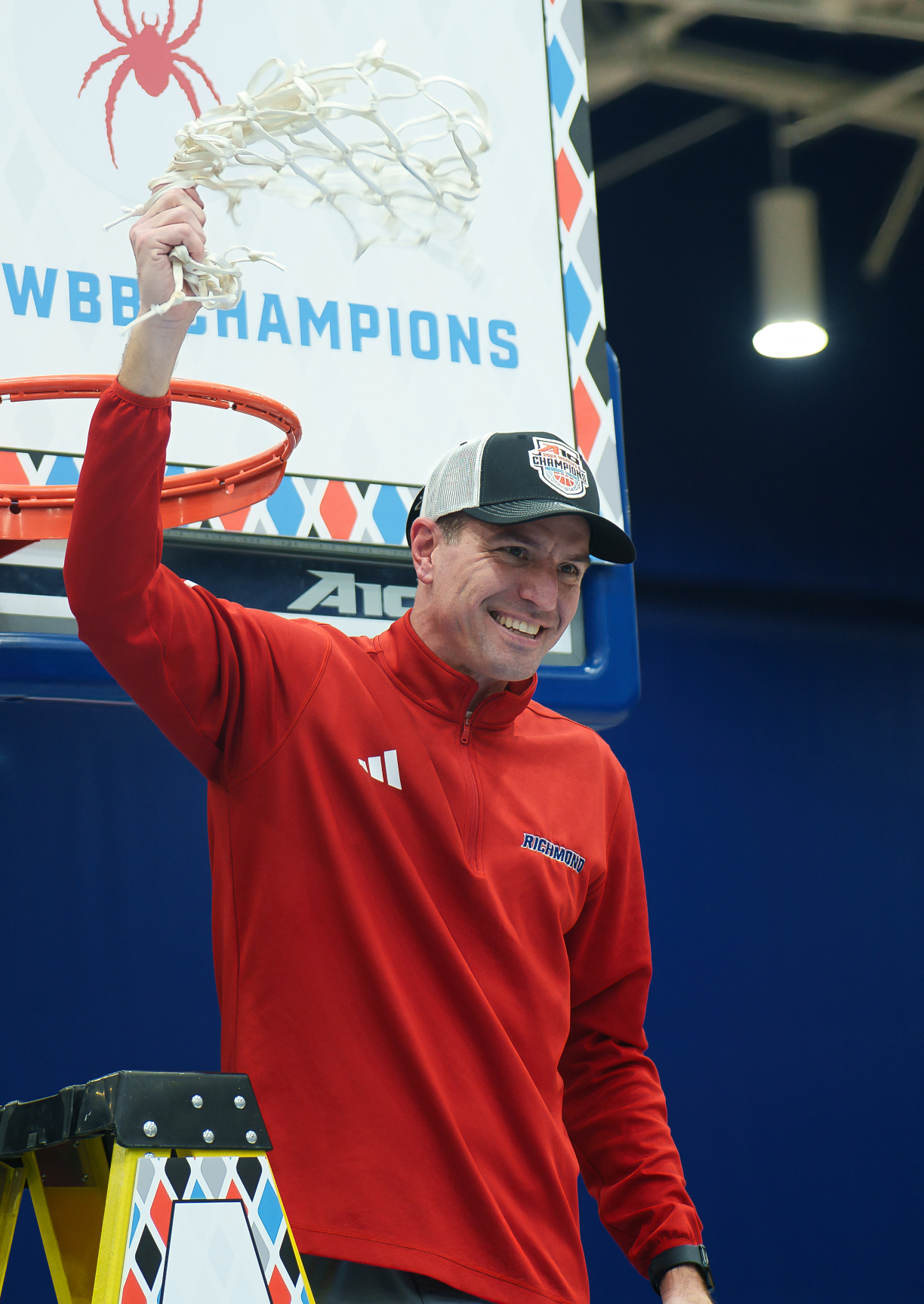
- Roussell after winning 2024 A-10 championship

Current position
- Title: Head coach
- Team: Virginia
- Conference: ACC
- Record: 6–0 (1.000)

Biographical details
- Education: Iowa ('01)

Coaching career (HC unless noted)
- 2002–2004: Minnesota State (grad. assistant)
- 2004–2012: Chicago
- 2012–2019: Bucknell
- 2019–2026: Richmond
- 2026–present: Virginia

Head coaching record
- Overall: 466–194 (.706)

Accomplishments and honors

Championships
- 3× UAA regular season (2008, 2011, 2012); 3× Patriot League regular season (2016, 2017, 2019); 2× Patriot League tournament (2017, 2019); 2× Atlantic 10 regular season (2024, 2025); Atlantic 10 tournament (2024)

Awards
- 3× UAA Coach of the Year (2008, 2011, 2012); 2× Patriot League Coach of the Year (2016, 2017); 2× Atlantic 10 Coach of the Year (2024, 2025); Kathy Delaney-Smith Mid-Major Coach of the Year (2025); ECAC Coach of the Year (2025)

Aaron Roussell is an American college basketball coach. He is currently the head coach of the Virginia Cavaliers women's basketball team.

== Career ==
Roussell is a 2001 graduate of the University of Iowa and he began his college coaching career as a graduate assistant at Minnesota State. After two seasons there, Roussell spent eight years as head women's basketball coach at the University of Chicago. Roussell then spent seven seasons as head coach at Bucknell University before being named head coach at Richmond on April 2, 2019. On April 7, 2026 he was named the head coach at Virginia.

== Head coaching record ==
Record table
Season	Team	Overall	Conference	Standing	Postseason
Chicago Maroons (University Athletic Association) (2004–2012)
2004–05	Chicago	16–9	9–5	4th	
2005–06	Chicago	17–8	6–8	5th	
2006–07	Chicago	18–7	7–7	5th	
2007–08	Chicago	22–6	11–3	1st	NCAA Third Round
2008–09	Chicago	17–8	8–6	4th	
2009–10	Chicago	19–7	11–3	2nd	NCAA First Round
2010–11	Chicago	25–4	14–0	1st	NCAA Quarterfinals
2011–12	Chicago	27–1	14–0	1st	NCAA Third Round
Chicago:		161–50 (.763)	80–32 (.714)		
Bucknell Bison (Patriot League) (2012–2019)
2012–13	Bucknell	15–16	5–9	6th	
2013–14	Bucknell	16–14	11–7	4th	WBI First Round
2014–15	Bucknell	18–12	10–8	T–4th	
2015–16	Bucknell	25–8	17–1	T–1st	WNIT Second Round
2016–17	Bucknell	27–6	16–2	1st	NCAA First Round
2017–18	Bucknell	22–10	15–3	2nd	WNIT First Round
2018–19	Bucknell	28–6	16–2	T–1st	NCAA First Round
Bucknell:		151–72 (.677)	90–32 (.738)		
Richmond Spiders (Atlantic 10 Conference) (2019–2026)
2019–20	Richmond	15–17	7–9	T–9th	
2020–21	Richmond	13–9	9–6	6th	
2021–22	Richmond	16–14	7–9	8th	
2022–23	Richmond	21–11	8–6	5th	WNIT Second Round
2023–24	Richmond	29–6	16–2	1st	NCAA First Round
2024–25	Richmond	28–7	17–1	1st	NCAA Second Round
2025–26	Richmond	26–8	15–3	3rd	NCAA First Four
Richmond:		148–72 (.673)	79–36 (.687)		
Virginia Cavaliers (Atlantic Coast Conference) (2026–present)
2026–27	Virginia	6–0	0–0		
Virginia:		6–0 (1.000)	0–0 (–)		
Total:		466–194 (.706)			
National champion Postseason invitational champion Conference regular season champion Conference regular season and conference tournament champion Division regular season champion Division regular season and conference tournament champion Conference tournament champion
