= Richmond Spiders basketball =

Richmond Spiders basketball may refer to either of the basketball teams that represent the University of Richmond:

- Richmond Spiders men's basketball
- Richmond Spiders women's basketball
