= La Salle basketball =

La Salle basketball may refer to:

- La Salle Explorers men's basketball, men's basketball teams of La Salle University in Philadelphia
- La Salle Explorers women's basketball, women's basketball teams of La Salle University in Philadelphia
- De La Salle Green Archers basketball, men's basketball teams of De La Salle University in Manila
