= 2024–25 Richmond Spiders women's basketball team =

Intercollegiate basketball season

2024–25 Richmond Spiders women's basketball

Atlantic 10 regular season champions

NCAA tournament, Second Round
- Conference: Atlantic 10 Conference
- Record: 28–7 (17–1 A-10)
- Head coach: Aaron Roussell (6th season)
- Associate head coach: Jeanine Radice
- Assistant coaches: Brittany Pinkney; Ariel Stephenson; Alex Louin; John Studer
- Home arena: Robins Center

2024–25 Atlantic 10 women's basketball standings
	Conf.				Overall
Team	W		L	PCT	W		L	PCT
Richmond	17	–	1	.944	28	–	7	.800
George Mason †	14	–	4	.778	27	–	6	.818
Davidson	13	–	5	.722	19	–	14	.576
Saint Joseph's	12	–	6	.667	24	–	10	.706
Rhode Island	11	–	7	.611	17	–	16	.515
Dayton	11	–	7	.611	18	–	13	.581
UMass	11	–	7	.611	17	–	15	.531
Fordham	9	–	9	.500	15	–	15	.500
Duquesne	9	–	9	.500	21	–	13	.618
Saint Louis	7	–	11	.389	15	–	19	.441
VCU	6	–	12	.333	12	–	19	.387
George Washington	5	–	13	.278	13	–	18	.419
Loyola Chicago	5	–	13	.278	13	–	17	.433
La Salle	3	–	15	.167	10	–	23	.303
St. Bonaventure	2	–	16	.111	6	–	24	.200
† 2025 A10 tournament winner

The 2024–25 Richmond Spiders women's basketball team represented the University of Richmond during the 2024–25 NCAA Division I women's basketball season. The Spiders, led by sixth-year head coach Aaron Roussell, played their home games at the Robins Center and were members of the Atlantic 10 Conference (A-10).

== Previous season ==
The Spiders finished the 2023–24 season with a record of 29–6, 16–2 in A-10 play, to win the outright regular-season championship. In the A-10 women's tournament, they earned the No. 1 seed and received first- and second-round byes before defeating No. 8 seed Loyola Chicago in the quarterfinals and No. 5 seed Duquesne in the semifinals. The Spiders claimed the A-10 tournament championship and an automatic bid to the NCAA tournament by defeating No. 6 seed Rhode Island in the championship final.

The Spiders earned a 10-seed in the NCAA tournament, where they fell to 7-seed Duke in the first round in Columbus, Ohio.

== Preseason ==
In a preseason poll of league head coaches, Richmond was chosen to repeat as champion of the Atlantic 10 Conference in 2024–25. Forwards Addie Budnik and Maggie Doogan were selected first-team preseason all-conference, and forward Rachel Ullstrom was named to the second team.

The Spiders took advantage of an NCAA rule allowing for preseason international training and competition trips, taking a ten-day trip to Spain in August and winning both exhibition games.

== Roster ==
2024–25 Richmond Spiders women's basketball team
Players
Coaches

Pos.	#	Name	Height	Year	Previous school	Hometown
G	3	Alicia Newell	5 ft 9 in (1.75 m)	Fr	Elizabeth Seton	Clinton, MD
F	8	Jada Green	6 ft 1 in (1.85 m)	RS Jr	St. Thomas Aquinas	Fort Lauderdale, FL
F	11	Anna Camden	6 ft 3 in (1.91 m)	GS	Shipley School; Penn State	Downingtown, PA
G	12	Faith Alston	5 ft 7 in (1.7 m)	GS	Paul VI Catholic; Appalachian State	Centreville, VA
F	13	Sam Dewey	6 ft 2 in (1.88 m)	Jr	Brooks School; Illinois	Melrose, MA
G	14	Ally Sweeney	5 ft 6 in (1.68 m)	So	Sparta	Sparta, NJ
G	15	Payton Richard	6 ft 0 in (1.83 m)	Fr	Rivers School	Bolton, MA
F	20	Addie Budnik	6 ft 2 in (1.88 m)	GS	Highland Park	Highland Park, IL
F	21	Courtney Swider	6 ft 4 in (1.93 m)	So	Tabor Academy	Portsmouth, RI
G	22	Rachel Ullstrom	6 ft 1 in (1.85 m)	Jr	Marianapolis Prep	Auburn, MA
G	23	Alyssa Jimenez	6 ft 0 in (1.83 m)	GS	Horizon; Florida Gulf Coast	Thornton, CO
F	24	Annika Manthy	6 ft 3 in (1.91 m)	Fr	John Hersey	Arlington Heights, IL
G	25	Katie Hill	6 ft 0 in (1.83 m)	GS	Saint John Vianney	Colts Neck, NJ
F	33	Steph Ouderkirk	6 ft 1 in (1.85 m)	GS	Spotswood; James Madison	Penn Laird, VA
F	44	Maggie Doogan	6 ft 2 in (1.88 m)	Jr	Cardinal O'Hara	Broomall, PA

Head coach

- Aaron Roussell (Iowa)

Assistant coach(es)

- Jeanine Radice (Fordham)
- Brittany Pinkney (VCU)
- Ariel Stephenson (Wake Forest)
- Alex Louin (Villanova)
- John Studer (Illinois)

Legend

- (C) Team captain
- (S) Suspended
- (I) Ineligible
- (W) Walk-on
- Injured
- Current redshirt

Roster
Last update: October 9, 2024

== Schedule ==
Richmond's 2024–25 non-conference schedule featured 13 games, including a pair of games in the Daytona Beach Classic at the end of November and another pair in the West Palm Beach Classic in late December.

In the Atlantic 10 portion of the schedule, Richmond played a total of 18 games, including both home and away games against Davidson, Dayton, Saint Joseph's and VCU. In addition, Richmond hosted George Mason, George Washington, Rhode Island, Saint Louis and St. Bonaventure, while the Spiders traveled to Duquesne, Fordham, La Salle, Loyola Chicago and UMass.

Date time, TV	Rank^{#}	Opponent^{#}	Result	Record	High points	High rebounds	High assists	Site (attendance) city, state
Non-conference regular season
November 4, 2024*; 8:00 p.m., ESPN+		at Temple	W 79–72	1–0	32 – Ullstrom	7 – Newell	7 – Budnik	Liacouras Center (3,485); Philadelphia, PA
November 9, 2024*; 1:00 p.m., ESPN+		Morgan State	W 93–39	2–0	15 – Tied	9 – Doogan	5 – Sweeney	Robins Center (971); Richmond, VA
November 12, 2024*; 7:00 p.m., ESPN+		at Fairfield	W 62–39	3–0	17 – Ullstrom	11 – Ullstrom	5 – Sweeney	Leo D. Mahoney Arena (1,443); Fairfield, CT
November 15, 2024*; 11:00 a.m., ESPN+		Gardner–Webb	W 92–44	4–0	17 – Doogan	6 – Camden	6 – Ouderkirk	Robins Center (2,914); Richmond, VA
November 21, 2024*; 6:00 p.m., ESPN+		William & Mary	W 82–47	5–0	12 – Tied	7 – Doogan	4 – Tied	Robins Center (1,054); Richmond, VA
November 24, 2024*; 3:30 p.m., ESPN+		at Appalachian State	W 73–61	6–0	23 – Doogan	9 – Tied	3 – Tied	Holmes Center (158); Boone, NC
November 29, 2024*; 11:00 a.m., BallerTV		vs. Oakland; Daytona Beach Classic	W 76–49	7–0	35 – Ullstrom	6 – Tied	7 – Hill	Ocean Center (75); Daytona Beach, FL
November 30, 2024*; 5:45 p.m., BallerTV		vs. Oklahoma State; Daytona Beach Classic	W 57–53	8–0	22 – Doogan	7 – Tied	4 – Sweeney	Ocean Center (120); Daytona Beach, FL
December 4, 2024*; 6:00 p.m., ESPN+/Monumental		Georgetown	L 53–55	8–1	20 – Doogan	7 – Doogan	3 – Tied	Robins Center (801); Richmond, VA
December 8, 2024*; 2:00 p.m., ESPN+/Monumental		vs. Columbia	W 85–76	9–1	21 – Doogan	7 – Tied	7 – Tied	Henrico Sports & Events Center (814); Henrico, VA
December 15, 2024*; 1:00 p.m., ESPN+/Monumental		No. 6 Texas	L 54–65	9–2	20 – Ullstrom	6 – Ullstrom	5 – Hill	Robins Center (2,714); Richmond, VA
December 20, 2024*; 2:15 p.m., BallerTV		vs. No. 18 Tennessee; West Palm Beach Classic	L 67–92	9–3	19 – Ullstrom	6 – Doogan	5 – Sweeney	Massimino Court (373); West Palm Beach, FL
December 21, 2024*; 1:15 p.m., BallerTV		vs. Alabama; West Palm Beach Classic	L 68–75	9–4	15 – Doogan	7 – Ullstrom	4 – Tied	Massimino Court (121); West Palm Beach, FL
Atlantic 10 regular season
December 29, 2024; 2:00 p.m., ESPN+		Dayton	W 55–37	10–4 (1–0)	14 – Budnik	9 – Budnik	4 – Sweeney	Robins Center (1,466); Richmond, VA
January 2, 2025; 6:30 p.m., ESPN+		at Fordham	L 78–80	10–5 (1–1)	24 – Budnik	5 – Tied	7 – Doogan	Rose Hill Gymnasium (278); New York, NY
January 5, 2025; 1:00 p.m., ESPN+		at UMass	W 82–52	11–5 (2–1)	16 – Tied	6 – Doogan	7 – Budnik	Mullins Center (1,100); Amherst, MA
January 8, 2025; 6:00 p.m., ESPN+		George Mason	W 88–86	12–5 (3–1)	37 – Doogan	6 – Tied	8 – Doogan	Robins Center (114); Richmond, VA
January 12, 2025; 3:00 p.m., ESPNU		at Davidson	W 63–41	13–5 (4–1)	26 – Doogan	7 – Doogan	3 – Alston	John M. Belk Arena (896); Davidson, NC
January 15, 2025; 6:00 p.m., ESPN+		St. Bonaventure	W 98–60	14–5 (5–1)	30 – Ullstrom	12 – Doogan	6 – Tied	Robins Center (877); Richmond, VA
January 19, 2025; 2:00 p.m., CBSSN		VCU; Capital City Classic	W 75–42	15–5 (6–1)	18 – Hill	8 – Tied	5 – Hill	Robins Center (3,462); Richmond, VA
January 23, 2025; 7:00 p.m., ESPN+		at Loyola Chicago	W 85–45	16–5 (7–1)	19 – Sweeney	7 – Doogan	7 – Sweeney	Joseph J. Gentile Arena (409); Chicago, IL
January 26, 2025; 1:00 p.m., ESPN+		at Dayton	W 83–72	17–5 (8–1)	26 – Doogan	11 – Doogan	6 – Tied	UD Arena (1,978); Dayton, OH
February 2, 2025; 2:00 p.m., ESPN+		Rhode Island	W 79–56	18–5 (9–1)	17 – Doogan	6 – Doogan	7 – Doogan	Robins Center (2,496); Richmond, VA
February 5, 2025; 6:30 p.m., ESPN+		at La Salle	W 72–53	19–5 (10–1)	22 – Doogan	11 – Doogan	4 – Sweeney	Tom Gola Arena (189); Philadelphia, PA
February 9, 2025; 2:00 p.m., CBSSN		at Duquesne	W 82–58	20–5 (11–1)	21 – Ullstrom	12 – Doogan	7 – Sweeney	UPMC Cooper Fieldhouse (1,416); Pittsburgh, PA
February 13, 2025; 8:00 p.m., Peacock		Saint Joseph's	W 59–51	21–5 (12–1)	12 – Budnik	7 – Budnik	4 – Doogan	Robins Center (1,325); Richmond, VA
February 16, 2025; 2:00 p.m., ESPN+		Saint Louis	W 59–49	22–5 (13–1)	16 – Tied	8 – Doogan	4 – Sweeney	Robins Center (2,422); Richmond, VA
February 19, 2025; 6:00 p.m., ESPN+		George Washington	W 67–57	23–5 (14–1)	26 – Doogan	11 – Doogan	3 – Tied	Robins Center (849); Richmond, VA
February 23, 2025; 1:00 p.m., ESPN+		at VCU	W 68–55	24–5 (15–1)	33 – Doogan	6 – Doogan	4 – Tied	Siegel Center (2,383); Richmond, VA
February 26, 2025; 6:00 p.m., ESPN+		Davidson	W 59–46	25–5 (16–1)	15 – Budnik	8 – Doogan	3 – Doogan	Robins Center (1,522); Richmond, VA
March 1, 2025; 2:00 p.m., ESPN+		at Saint Joseph's	W 73–65	26–5 (17–1)	13 – Tied	8 – Doogan	5 – Sweeney	Hagan Arena (1,785); Philadelphia, PA
Atlantic 10 tournament
March 7, 2025; 11:00 a.m., Peacock	(1)	vs. (9) Duquesne; Quarterfinals	W 63–58	27–5	15 – Budnik	7 – Doogan	6 – Sweeney	Henrico Sports & Events Center; Henrico, VA
March 8, 2025; 11:00 a.m., CBSSN	(1)	vs. (4) Saint Joseph's; Semifinals	L 49–50	27–6	16 – Ullstrom	5 – Tied	3 – Doogan	Henrico Sports & Events Center (2,611); Henrico, VA
NCAA tournament
March 21, 2025*; 7:30 p.m., ESPNEWS	(8 S1)	vs. (9 S1) Georgia Tech; First round	W 74–49	28–6	30 – Doogan	15 – Doogan	6 – Doogan	Pauley Pavilion (5,703); Los Angeles, CA
March 23, 2025*; 10:00 p.m., ESPN	(8 S1)	at (1 S1) No. 1 UCLA; Second round	L 67–84	28–7	27 – Doogan	7 – Ullstrom	7 – Doogan	Pauley Pavilion (6,119); Los Angeles
*Non-conference game. ^{#}Rankings from AP poll. (#) Tournament seedings in parentheses. All times are in Eastern.

== Rankings ==
Ranking movements Legend: ██ Increase in ranking ██ Decrease in ranking — = Not ranked RV = Received votes
	Week																				
Poll	Pre	1	2	3	4	5	6	7	8	9	10	11	12	13	14	15	16	17	18	19	Final
AP	—	—	RV	RV	RV	RV	RV	—	—	—	—	—	—	RV	RV	RV	RV	RV	—	—	RV
Coaches	RV	RV	RV	RV	RV	—	—	—	—	—	—	RV	RV	RV	RV	RV	RV	RV	RV	RV	RV
