= 2022–23 VCU Rams women's basketball team =

Intercollegiate basketball season

2022–23 VCU Rams women's basketball
- Conference: Atlantic 10 Conference
- Record: 7–16 (4–7 A-10)
- Head coach: Beth O'Boyle (7th season)
- Assistant coaches: Kirk Crawford; Jessica Simmonds; Brittany Parker
- Home arena: Siegel Center

2022–23 Atlantic 10 women's basketball standings
	Conf.				Overall
Team	W		L	PCT	W		L	PCT
Rhode Island	14	–	2	.875	26	–	7	.788
UMass	14	–	2	.875	27	–	7	.794
Fordham	10	–	6	.625	19	–	13	.594
Saint Louis†	10	–	6	.625	17	–	18	.486
Richmond	8	–	6	.571	21	–	11	.656
Saint Joseph's	9	–	7	.563	20	–	11	.645
George Washington	9	–	7	.563	18	–	13	.581
La Salle	8	–	7	.533	17	–	14	.548
Duquesne	8	–	8	.500	19	–	12	.613
George Mason	8	–	8	.500	16	–	15	.516
Davidson	6	–	8	.429	14	–	16	.467
Dayton	5	–	10	.333	7	–	21	.250
VCU	4	–	12	.250	7	–	22	.241
St. Bonaventure	3	–	13	.188	6	–	26	.188
Loyola Chicago	1	–	15	.063	6	–	24	.200
† 2023 A10 Tournament winner As of March 24, 2023

The 2022–23 VCU Rams women's basketball team represented Virginia Commonwealth University during the 2022–23 NCAA Division I women's basketball season. It was the program's 49th season of existence, and their tenth season in the Atlantic 10 Conference. The Rams were led by ninth year head coach Beth O'Boyle and played their home games at the Stuart C. Siegel Center.

== Roster ==
2022–23 VCU Rams women's basketball team
Players
Coaches

Pos.	#	Name	Height	Year	Previous school	Hometown
G	0	Sarah Te-Biasu	5 ft 5 in (1.65 m)	So	Niagara Prep	Montreal, QC
G	1	Anisja Harris	5 ft 8 in (1.73 m)	GS	Florida A&M	Columbus, OH
G	2	Janika Griffith-Wallace	5 ft 8 in (1.73 m)	RS Sr	Murray State	Brampton, ON
G	3	Timaya Lewis-Eutsey	5 ft 8 in (1.73 m)	Fr	Life Center Academy	Trenton, NJ
G	4	Grace Hutson	5 ft 9 in (1.75 m)	RS So	St. Joseph Central	Christiansburg, VA
G	5	Adebukola Akomolafe	5 ft 9 in (1.75 m)	So	Americas HS	El Paso, TX
G	11	Mary-Anna Asare	5 ft 7 in (1.7 m)	Fr	J. Addison School	Markham, ON
C	13	Chloe Bloom	6 ft 2 in (1.88 m)	RS Sr	Oklahoma	Sydney, Australia
G	21	Deniz Torgut	5 ft 10 in (1.78 m)	Fr	Botas Gelisim Ankara	İzmir, Turkey
F	22	Jennifer Ezeh	6 ft 2 in (1.88 m)	RS Jr	Missouri State	Nibo, Nigeria
F	32	Keowa Walters	6 ft 0 in (1.83 m)	GS	Buffalo	Toronto, ON
F	33	Elze Motekaityte	6 ft 2 in (1.88 m)	Jr	New Hope Academy	Klaipėda, Lithuania
F	34	Mykel Parham	6 ft 1 in (1.85 m)	Sr	Creighton	Burnsville, MN
F	35	Samantha Robinson	6 ft 1 in (1.85 m)	RS Sr	Central Michigan	Bradford, ON

Head coach

- Beth O'Boyle (Gettysburg)

Assistant coach(es)

- Kirk Crawford (Western Colorado)
- Jessica Simmonds (George Washington)
- Brittany Parker (St. Augustine's)

Legend

- (C) Team captain
- (S) Suspended
- (I) Ineligible
- (W) Walk-on
- Injured
- Current redshirt

Roster

== Schedule ==
Date time, TV	Rank^{#}	Opponent^{#}	Result	Record	High points	High rebounds	High assists	Site (attendance) city, state
Globl Jam Tournament
July 5, 2022*; 11:00 am		vs. France national team Group phase	L 44–62		17 – Asare	9 – Bloom	8 – Robinson	Mattamy Athletic Centre; Toronto, ON
July 6, 2022*; 11:00 am		at Canada national team Group phase	L 69–78		27 – Robinson	6 – Walters	4 – Robinson	Mattamy Athletic Centre; Toronto, ON
July 7, 2022*; 11:00 am		vs. Belgium national team Group phase	L 50–63		9 – Bloom	6 – Robinson	7 – Griffith-Wallace	Mattamy Athletic Centre; Toronto, ON
July 9, 2022*; 11:00 am		at Canada national team Semifinals	L 60–85		29 – Robinson	3 – Robinson	3 – Robinson	Mattamy Athletic Centre; Toronto, ON
Non-conference regular season
November 7, 2022*; 11:00 am, MASN/ESPN+		Lafayette	W 65–42	1–0	12 – Bloom	11 – Bloom	6 – Hutson	Siegel Center (426); Richmond, VA
November 11, 2022*; 6:00 pm, ESPN+		William & Mary	L 61–66	1–1	19 – Te-Biasu	8 – Griffith-Wallace	5 – Te-Biasu	Siegel Center (493); Richmond, VA
November 15, 2022*; 7:00 pm, FloHoops		at Delaware	L 50–63	1–2	11 – Bloom	7 – Bloom	1 – Tied	Bob Carpenter Center (1,016); Newark, DE
November 20, 2022*; 1:00 pm, ESPN+		at Charlotte	L 47–55	1–3	19 – Te-Biasu	9 – Griffith-Wallace	2 – Tied	Halton Arena (805); Charlotte, NC
November 24, 2022*; 3:15 pm, ESPN3		vs. Seton Hall; Paradise Jam	W 62–61	2–3	14 – Te-Biasu	8 – Robinson	3 – Te-Biasu	Sports and Fitness Center (624); Charlotte Amalie West, VI
November 25, 2022*; 3:15 pm, ESPN3		vs. Georgia; Paradise Jam	L 54–68	2–4	25 – Te-Biasu	4 – Griffith-Wallace	4 – Te-Biasu	Sports and Fitness Center (824); Charlotte Amalie West, VI
November 26, 2022*; 1:00 pm, ESPN3		vs. Wisconsin; Paradise Jam	W 75–67	3–4	23 – Te-Biasu	6 – Walters	4 – Asare	Sports and Fitness Center; Charlotte Amalie West, VI
December 1, 2022*; 6:00 pm, ESPN+ / MASN		James Madison	L 60–62	3–5	16 – Te-Biasu	7 – Tied	3 – Te-Biasu	Siegel Center (471); Richmond, VA
December 4, 2022*; 2:00 pm, ESPN+		at East Carolina	L 51–69	3–6	8 – Tied	5 – Tied	3 – Te-Biasu	Minges Coliseum (665); Greenville, NC
December 8, 2022*; 6:30 pm, ESPN+		at Old Dominion; Rivalry	L 44–61	3–7	9 – Griffith-Wallace	5 – Griffith-Wallace	2 – Griffith-Wallace	Chartway Arena (2,516); Norfolk, VA
December 12, 2022*; 6:00 pm, ESPN+		Gardner–Webb	L 56–61	3–8	21 – Te-Biasu	10 – Asare	3 – Motekaityte	Siegel Center (457); Richmond, VA
December 20, 2022*; 3:30 pm		vs. Tennessee Tech; Tulane Holiday Tournament semifinals	Canceled due to COVID-19 protocols					Devlin Fieldhouse; New Orleans, LA
December 21, 2022*; TBD		vs. TBD; Tulane Holiday Tournament final/3rd place game	Canceled due to COVID-19 protocols					Devlin Fieldhouse; New Orleans, LA
December 28, 2022*; 6:00 pm, ESPN+		Howard	L 67–79	3–9	13 – Asare	8 – Parham	4 – Asare	Siegel Center (729); Richmond, VA
Atlantic 10 regular season
January 1, 2023; 1:00 pm, ESPN+		Saint Louis	L 83–86 ^{OT}	3–10 (0–1)	22 – Te-Biasu	6 – Walters	8 – Te-Biasu	Siegel Center (478); Richmond, VA
January 4, 2023; 12:00 pm, ESPN+		at Fordham	L 59–60	3–11 (0–2)	21 – Te-Biasu	10 – Parham	3 – Te-Biasu	Rose Hill Gymnasium (1,650); New York, NY
January 11, 2023; 6:00 pm, ESPN+		at Richmond; Capital City Classic	W 54–51	4–11 (1–2)	26 – Te-Biasu	10 – Lewis-Eutsey	3 – Lewis-Eutsey	Robins Center (703); Richmond, VA
January 14, 2023; 1:00 pm, ESPN+		George Mason; Rivalry	W 55–45	5–11 (2–2)	15 – Asare	11 – Parham	2 – Te-Biasu	Siegel Center (1,133); Richmond, VA
January 18, 2023; 6:00 pm, ESPN+		Davidson	L 60–71	5–12 (2–3)	30 – Te-Biasu	6 – Griffith-Wallace	4 – Asare	Siegel Center (496); Richmond, VA
January 22, 2023; 12:00 pm		at George Washington	L 61–69	5–13 (2–4)	14 – Te-Biasu	9 – Walters	4 – Te-Biasu	Charles E. Smith Center (502); Washington, D.C.
January 26, 2023; 12:00 pm, NBC Sports		at UMass	L 57–83	5–14 (2–5)	12 – Te-Biasu	7 – Griffith-Wallace	4 – Te-Biasu	Mullins Center (3,516); Amherst, MA
January 29, 2023; 1:00 pm, ESPN+		Loyola Chicago	W 60–50	6–14 (3–5)	19 – Bloom	7 – Bloom	5 – Griffith-Wallace	Siegel Center (603); Richmond, VA
February 1, 2023; 11:00 am, ESPN+		La Salle	W 53–38	7–14 (4–5)	14 – Hutson	9 – Parham	4 – Griffith-Wallace	Siegel Center (3,253); Richmond, VA
February 4, 2023; 2:00 pm		at Duquesne	L 63–66	7–15 (4–6)	18 – Griffith-Wallace	7 – Walters	4 – Griffith-Wallace	UPMC Cooper Fieldhouse (787); Pittsburgh, PA
February 8, 2023; 7:00 pm		at Saint Joseph's	L 45–67	7–16 (4–7)	19 – Lewis-Eutsey	5 – Griffith-Wallace	1 – Tied	Hagan Arena (312); Philadelphia, PA
February 12, 2023; 12:00 pm, ESPNU		Rhode Island						Siegel Center; Richmond, VA
February 15, 2023; 6:00 pm, ESPN+		Dayton						Siegel Center; Richmond, VA
February 18, 2023; 4:00 pm, ESPN3		at St. Bonaventure						Reilly Center; St. Bonaventure, NY
February 22, 2023; 6:00 pm, ESPN+		Richmond; Capital City Classic						Siegel Center; Richmond, VA
February 25, 2023; 2:00 pm, ESPN3		at La Salle						Tom Gola Arena; Philadelphia, PA
*Non-conference game. ^{#}Rankings from AP Poll. (#) Tournament seedings in parentheses. All times are in Eastern Time.

== See also ==
- 2022–23 VCU Rams men's basketball team
