= 2022–23 Saint Louis Billikens women's basketball team =

American college basketball season

2022–23 Saint Louis Billikens women's basketball
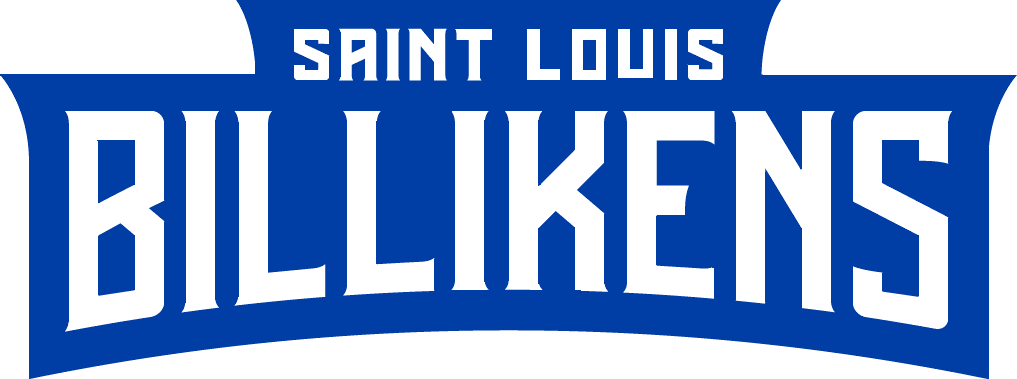

Atlantic 10 tournament champions

NCAA tournament, first round
- Conference: Atlantic 10 Conference
- Record: 17–18 (10–6 A-10)
- Head coach: Rebecca Tillett (1st season)
- Assistant coaches: Tiffany Sardin; Ryenn Micaletti; Tra'Dayja Smith
- Home arena: Chaifetz Arena

2022–23 Atlantic 10 women's basketball standings
	Conf.				Overall
Team	W		L	PCT	W		L	PCT
Rhode Island	14	–	2	.875	26	–	7	.788
UMass	14	–	2	.875	27	–	7	.794
Fordham	10	–	6	.625	19	–	13	.594
Saint Louis†	10	–	6	.625	17	–	18	.486
Richmond	8	–	6	.571	21	–	11	.656
Saint Joseph's	9	–	7	.563	20	–	11	.645
George Washington	9	–	7	.563	18	–	13	.581
La Salle	8	–	7	.533	17	–	14	.548
Duquesne	8	–	8	.500	19	–	12	.613
George Mason	8	–	8	.500	16	–	15	.516
Davidson	6	–	8	.429	14	–	16	.467
Dayton	5	–	10	.333	7	–	21	.250
VCU	4	–	12	.250	7	–	22	.241
St. Bonaventure	3	–	13	.188	6	–	26	.188
Loyola Chicago	1	–	15	.063	6	–	24	.200
† 2023 A10 Tournament winner As of March 24, 2023

The 2022–23 Saint Louis Billikens women's basketball team represented Saint Louis University during the 2022–23 NCAA Division I women's basketball season. The Billikens, led by first-year head coach Rebecca Tillett, played their home games at the Chaifetz Arena in St. Louis, Missouri and were members of the Atlantic 10 Conference.

== Media ==
All non-televised Billikens home games and conference road games streamed on ESPN+.

== Roster ==
2022–23 Saint Louis Billikens women's basketball team
Players
Coaches

Pos.	#	Name	Height	Year	Previous school	Hometown
G	00	Kyla McMakin	5 ft 11 in (1.8 m)	Sr	Ocena Lakes; Longwood	Virginia Beach, VA
G	2	Camree Clegg	5 ft 5 in (1.65 m)	GS	Wayne Memorial; St. John's	Westland, MI
G	3	Abby Liber	6 ft 0 in (1.83 m)	Fr	Avon	Avon, OH
G	4	Kennedy Calhoun	5 ft 5 in (1.65 m)	So	Hickory Ridge; Longwood	Harrisburg, NC
G	10	Isabel Tillett	5 ft 9 in (1.75 m)	RS Fr	Cosby; Longwood	Manassas, VA
G	11	Julia Martinez	5 ft 10 in (1.78 m)	Sr	Loyola Academy	Chicago, IL
F	12	Zeynep Şevval Gül	6 ft 4 in (1.93 m)	RS Jr	Ferenhbace; Arizona	Istanbul, Turkey
G	15	Ashleigh Connor	5 ft 11 in (1.8 m)	Fr	Mount Lebanon	Pittsburgh, PA
F	21	Nafatoumata Haidara	6 ft 5 in (1.96 m)	Sr	Largo; Chicago State	Bamako, Mali
G/F	22	Nia Mocastro	6 ft 2 in (1.88 m)	Fr	St. Charles West	St. Charles, MO
G	24	Kiley Bess	6 ft 0 in (1.83 m)	Jr	Poplar Bluff	Poplar Bluff, MO
F	32	Peyton Kennedy	5 ft 11 in (1.8 m)	Jr	Boylan Catholic	Rockford, IL
F	34	Sarah Lazar	6 ft 3 in (1.91 m)	So	Edgewood	Madison, WI
G/F	35	Briana Johns	5 ft 11 in (1.8 m)	Jr	Thomas Edison; Longwood	Alexandria, VA
F/C	42	Brooke Flowers	6 ft 5 in (1.96 m)	Sr	Metro Academic & Classical	St. Louis, MO

Head coach

- Rebecca Tillett (William & Mary)

Assistant coach(es)

- Tiffany Sardin (Virginia)
- Ryenn Micaletti (Seton Hall)
- Tra'Dayja Smith (Longwood)

Legend

- (C) Team captain
- (S) Suspended
- (I) Ineligible
- (W) Walk-on
- Injured
- Current redshirt

Roster
Last update: August 22, 2024

== Schedule ==
Date time, TV	Rank^{#}	Opponent^{#}	Result	Record	Site (attendance) city, state
Exhibition
November 3, 2022*; 7:00 p.m.		Maryville	L 70–78		Chaifetz Arena (218); St. Louis, MO
Non-conference regular season
November 7, 2022*; 10:00 a.m., ESPN3		at Indiana State	L 62–64	0–1	Hulman Center (1,092); Terre Haute, IN
November 11, 2022*; 7:30 p.m., ESPN+		SIU Edwardsville	W 95–38	1–1	Chaifetz Arena (352); St. Louis, MO
November 13, 2022*; 2:00 p.m., ESPN+		at Northern Iowa	L 64–84	1–2	McLeod Center (1,966); Cedar Falls, IA
November 15, 2022*; 6:00 p.m., ESPN+		at Missouri State	L 55–71	1–3	Great Southern Bank Arena (1,870); Springfield, MO
November 18, 2022*; 7:00 p.m., ESPN+		Green Bay	L 70–73	1–4	Chaifetz Arena (230); St. Louis, MO
November 20, 2022*; 3:00 p.m., ESPN+		South Dakota	L 67–71	1–5	Chaifetz Arena (325); St. Louis, MO
November 25, 2022*; 10:00 a.m., FloSports		vs. No. 21 Baylor; Gulf Coast Showcase quarterfinals	L 58–92	1–6	Hertz Arena (213); Fort Myers, FL
November 26, 2022*; 10:00 a.m., FloSports		vs. Belmont; Gulf Coast Showcase consolation 2nd round	L 68–78	1–7	Hertz Arena (176); Fort Myers, FL
November 27, 2022*; 10:00 a.m., FloSports		vs. Air Force; Gulf Coast Showcase 7th-place game	W 77–58	2–7	Hertz Arena (135); Fort Myers, FL
November 30, 2022*; 7:00 p.m., SECN+		at Missouri	L 52–82	2–8	Mizzou Arena; Columbia, MO
December 3, 2022*; 7:00 p.m., ESPN+		Illinois State	W 75–65	3–8	Chaifetz Arena (315); St. Louis, MO
December 5, 2022*; 5:30 p.m., ESPN+		at Ball State	L 51–85	3–9	Worthen Arena (1,011); Muncie, IN
December 8, 2022*; 7:00 p.m., ESPN+		Wichita State	L 74–77	3–10	Chaifetz Arena (275); St. Louis, MO
December 17, 2022*; 7:00 p.m., ESPN+		at Memphis	L 71–83	3–11	Elma Roane Fieldhouse (731); Memphis, TN
December 21, 2022*; 4:00 p.m., ESPN+		Southern Illinois	W 82–54	4–11	Chaifetz Arena (460); St. Louis, MO
Atlantic 10 regular season
December 28, 2022; 7:00 p.m., ESPN+		Loyola–Chicago	L 47–60	4–12 (0–1)	Chaifetz Arena (475); St. Louis, MO
January 1, 2023; 12:00 p.m., ESPN+		at VCU	W 86–83	5–12 (1–1)	Siegel Center (478); Richmond, VA
January 7, 2023; 1:00 p.m., ESPN+		at Saint Joseph's	L 47–71	5–13 (1–2)	Hagan Arena (518); Philadelphia, PA
January 12, 2023; 7:00 p.m., ESPN+		Rhode Island	L 65–76	5–14 (1–3)	Chaifetz Arena (346); St. Louis, MO
January 15, 2023; 1:00 p.m., CBSSN		Dayton	W 80–69	6–14 (2–3)	Chaifetz Arena (1,024); St. Louis, MO
January 18, 2023; 5:00 p.m., ESPN+		at Duquesne	L 63–68	6–15 (2–4)	UPMC Cooper Fieldhouse (833); Pittsburgh, PA
January 25, 2023; 6:00 p.m., ESPN+		at Davidson	L 71–75	6–16 (2–5)	John M. Belk Arena (488); Davidson, NC
January 28, 2023; 7:00 p.m., ESPN+		Fordham	W 87–84	7–16 (3–5)	Chaifetz Arena (913); St. Louis, MO
February 1, 2023; 11:00 a.m., ESPN+		George Mason	W 68–56	8–16 (4–5)	Chaifetz Arena (7,582); St. Louis, MO
February 5, 2023; 12:00 p.m., ESPN+		at St. Bonaventure	W 75–61	9–16 (5–5)	Reilly Center (267); Olean, NY
February 8, 2023; 10:00 a.m., ESPN+		at Dayton	W 74–65	10–16 (6–5)	UD Arena (11,635); Dayton, OH
February 11, 2023; 7:00 p.m., ESPN+		George Washington	W 76–64	11–16 (7–5)	Chaifetz Arena (1,504); St. Louis, MO
February 15, 2023; 5:00 p.m., ESPN+		at Richmond	L 74–84	11–17 (7–6)	Robins Center (504); Richmond, VA
February 19, 2023; 2:00 p.m., ESPN+		La Salle	W 74–63	12–17 (8–6)	Chaifetz Arena (1,576); St. Louis, MO
February 22, 2023; 2:00 p.m., ESPN+		UMass	W 77–75	13–17 (9–6)	Chaifetz Arena (913); St. Louis, MO
February 25, 2023; 1:00 p.m., ESPN3		at Loyola–Chicago	W 73–55	14–17 (10–6)	Gentile Arena (1,156); Chicago, IL
Atlantic 10 tournament
March 3, 2023; 6:30 p.m., ESPN+	(3)	vs. (6) Saint Joseph's; Quarterfinals	W 59–44	15–17	Chase Fieldhouse (1,109); Wilmington, DE
March 4, 2023; 12:30 p.m., CBSSN	(3)	vs. (2) Rhode Island; Semifinals	W 59–56	16–17	Chase Fieldhouse (1,923); Wilmington, DE
March 5, 2023; 11:00 a.m., ESPNU	(3)	vs. (1) UMass; Final	W 91–85 ^{OT}	17–17	Chase Fieldhouse (2,331); Wilmington, DE
NCAA tournament
March 18, 2023*; 12:00 p.m., ABC	(S3 13)	at (S3 4) No. 24 Tennessee; First round	L 50–95	17–18	Thompson–Boling Arena (6,871); Knoxville, TN
*Non-conference game. ^{#}Rankings from AP poll. (#) Tournament seedings in parentheses. S=Seattle 3. All times are in Central.

== Rankings ==
Regular-season polls
Poll	Pre- season	Week 2	Week 3	Week 4	Week 5	Week 6	Week 7	Week 8	Week 9	Week 10	Week 11	Week 12	Week 13	Week 14	Week 15	Week 16	Week 17	Week 18	Week 19	Final
AP																				N/A
Coaches																				

Legend
	Increase in ranking
	Decrease in ranking
	No change
(RV)	Received votes
(NR)	Not ranked

== See also ==
- 2022–23 Saint Louis Billikens men's basketball team
