= 2022–23 Richmond Spiders women's basketball team =

Intercollegiate basketball season

2022–23 Richmond Spiders women's basketball

WNIT, second round
- Conference: Atlantic 10 Conference
- Record: 21–11 (8–6 A-10)
- Head coach: Aaron Roussell (4th season)
- Assistant coaches: Jeanine Radice; Ka'lia Johnson; Brittany Pinkney
- Home arena: Robins Center

2022–23 Atlantic 10 women's basketball standings
	Conf.				Overall
Team	W		L	PCT	W		L	PCT
Rhode Island	14	–	2	.875	26	–	7	.788
UMass	14	–	2	.875	27	–	7	.794
Fordham	10	–	6	.625	19	–	13	.594
Saint Louis†	10	–	6	.625	17	–	18	.486
Richmond	8	–	6	.571	21	–	11	.656
Saint Joseph's	9	–	7	.563	20	–	11	.645
George Washington	9	–	7	.563	18	–	13	.581
La Salle	8	–	7	.533	17	–	14	.548
Duquesne	8	–	8	.500	19	–	12	.613
George Mason	8	–	8	.500	16	–	15	.516
Davidson	6	–	8	.429	14	–	16	.467
Dayton	5	–	10	.333	7	–	21	.250
VCU	4	–	12	.250	7	–	22	.241
St. Bonaventure	3	–	13	.188	6	–	26	.188
Loyola Chicago	1	–	15	.063	6	–	24	.200
† 2023 A10 Tournament winner As of March 24, 2023

The 2022–23 Richmond Spiders women's basketball team represented the University of Richmond during the 2022–23 NCAA Division I women's basketball season. The Spiders, led by fourth-year head coach Aaron Roussell, played their home games at the Robins Center in Richmond, Virginia and were members of the Atlantic 10 Conference (A-10). They finished the season 21–11, 8–6 in A-10 play, to finish in fifth place.

== Previous season ==
The Spiders finished the 2021–22 season with a record of 16–14, 7–9 in A-10 play, to finish in eighth place. In the A-10 women's tournament, they received a first-round bye before falling to No. 9 seed Davidson in the second round.

== Roster ==
2022–23 Richmond Spiders women's basketball team
Players
Coaches

Pos.	#	Name	Height	Year	Previous school	Hometown
G	1	Grace Townsend	5 ft 5 in (1.65 m)	Jr	James River	Midlothian, VA
G	2	Sydney Boone	5 ft 8 in (1.73 m)	So	Highland Springs	Richmond, VA
F	4	Jada Green	6 ft 1 in (1.85 m)	Fr	St. Thomas Aquinas High School	Parkland, FL
F	11	Cayla Williams	6 ft 2 in (1.88 m)	So	Episcopal	Gainesville, VA
G	13	Torin Rogers	6 ft 1 in (1.85 m)	Fr	Murphy High School	Brasstown, NC
F	20	Addie Budnik	6 ft 2 in (1.88 m)	Jr	Highland Park	Highland Park, IL
G	21	Kylee Lewandowski	6 ft 1 in (1.85 m)	Jr	North Catholic	Pittsburgh, PA
G	22	Rachel Ullstrom	6 ft 1 in (1.85 m)	Fr	Marianapolis Prep	Auburn, MA
F	24	Emilija Krista Grava	6 ft 2 in (1.88 m)	GS	Liepajas Papirisk SSS; Wagner	Līgatne, Latvia
G	25	Katie Hill	6 ft 0 in (1.83 m)	So	Saint John Vianney	Colts Neck, NJ
F	31	Elaina Chapman	6 ft 3 in (1.91 m)	Sr	Trinity Episcopal	Richmond, VA
G	32	Siobhan Ryan	6 ft 0 in (1.83 m)	Jr	Sacred Heart	Buffalo, NY
G	41	Angel Burgos	5 ft 8 in (1.73 m)	Jr	Trinity Episcopal	Richmond, VA
F	44	Maggie Doogan	6 ft 2 in (1.88 m)	Fr	Cardinal O'Hara High School	Broomall, PA

Head coach

- Aaron Roussell (Iowa)

Assistant coach(es)

- Jeanine Radice (Fordham)
- Ka'lia Johnson (Duke)
- Brittany Pinkney (VCU)

Legend

- (C) Team captain
- (S) Suspended
- (I) Ineligible
- (W) Walk-on
- Injured
- Current redshirt

Roster
Last update: November 13, 2024

== Schedule ==
Richmond's 2022–23 non-conference schedule featured 13 games, including a pair of games in the Navy Classic in Annapolis, Maryland, and another pair in the Puerto Rico Clasico in San Juan, Puerto Rico.

In the Atlantic 10 portion of the schedule, Richmond was scheduled to play a total of 16 games, including home and away games against VCU and Davidson. In addition, Richmond was scheduled to host George Washington, George Mason, Saint Joseph's, La Salle, Saint Louis and St. Bonaventure, while the Spiders traveled to Loyola Chicago, Rhode Island, Fordham, Massachusetts, Dayton and Duquesne. However, the away games at Davidson and Dayton were canceled due to COVID-19 issues in opponents' programs.

The Spiders finished in fifth place in Atlantic 10 play and faced No. 12 seed Dayton in the second round of the A-10 women's tournament, advancing by a score of 71–60. The Spiders defeated No. 4 seed Fordham in the quarterfinals, 70–65, before falling to No. 1 seed Massachusetts in the semifinals, 80–60.

The Spiders were selected to participate in the 2023 WNIT, hosting Penn in the first round in the Spiders' first postseason appearance since the 2014–15 season. The Spiders defeated Penn, 75–52, and advanced to play conference foe Rhode Island in the second round where they fell, 74–64.

Date time, TV	Rank^{#}	Opponent^{#}	Result	Record	High points	High rebounds	High assists	Site (attendance) city, state
Non-conference regular season
November 7, 2022*; 3:30 p.m., ESPN+		at Liberty	W 69–48	1–0	21 – Budnik	8 – Townsend	3 – tied	Liberty Arena (792); Lynchburg, VA
November 10, 2022*; 6:00 p.m., ESPN+		Mount St. Mary's	W 87–44	2–0	16 – Budnik	6 – Budnik	6 – Townsend	Robins Center (396); Richmond, VA
November 13, 2022*; 2:00 p.m., ACCN		at Clemson	L 40–61	2–1	13 – Hill	7 – tied	4 – Townsend	Littlejohn Coliseum (857); Clemson, SC
November 17, 2022*; 7:00 p.m., ESPN+		at UMBC	W 64–57	3–1	16 – Budnik	7 – Budnik	2 – tied	Chesapeake Employers Insurance Arena (125); Baltimore, MD
November 20, 2022*; 2:00 p.m., ESPN+		Hampton	W 68–65	4–1	19 – Townsend	11 – Budnik	4 – Budnik	Robins Center (471); Richmond, VA
November 26, 2022*; 4:00 p.m.		vs. Idaho; Navy Classic	W 80–49	5–1	23 – Ryan	11 – Townsend	4 – Townsend	Alumni Hall (174); Annapolis, MD
November 27, 2022*; 3:30 p.m.		vs. Northern Illinois; Navy Classic	L 64–67	5–2	16 – Budnik	7 – tied	4 – tied	Alumni Hall (173); Annapolis, MD
December 1, 2022*; 7:00 p.m., FloSports		at William & Mary	W 74–62	6–2	23 – Townsend	7 – tied	4 – Townsend	Kaplan Arena (229); Williamsburg, VA
December 4, 2022*; 2:00 p.m., ESPN+		Duke	L 49–100	6–3	11 – Ullstrom	3 – tied	4 – Townsend	Robins Center (1,262); Richmond, VA
December 11, 2022*; 2:00 p.m., ESPN+		Longwood	W 119–55	7–3	20 – Ryan	13 – Budnik	7 – Townsend	Robins Center (618); Richmond, VA
December 15, 2022*; 11:00 a.m., FloSports		at Elon	W 63–51	8–3	15 – Budnik	5 – Townsend	6 – Townsend	Schar Center (3,087); Elon, NC
December 20, 2022*; 2:00 p.m., FloSports		vs. Ball State; Puerto Rico Clasico	W 75–73	9–3	27 – Ryan	5 – tied	9 – Townsend	Roberto Clemente Coliseum (100); San Juan, Puerto Rico
December 21, 2022*; 2:00 p.m., FloSports		vs. Tarleton State; Puerto Rico Clasico	W 55–43	10–3	28 – Budnik	8 – tied	6 – Townsend	Roberto Clemente Coliseum (100); San Juan, Puerto Rico
Atlantic 10 regular season
December 31, 2022 noon, ESPN+		George Washington	L 63–65	10–4 (0–1)	14 – tied	5 – tied	2 – tied	Robins Center (627); Richmond, VA
January 4, 2023; 7:00 p.m., ESPN+		at Loyola Chicago	W 68–49	11–4 (1–1)	20 – Hill	12 – Hill	4 – Boone	Gentile Arena (404); Chicago, IL
January 8, 2023; 1:00 p.m., ESPN+		at Davidson	Canceled due to COVID-19 protocols					Belk Arena; Davidson, NC
January 11, 2023; 6:00 p.m., ESPN+		VCU	L 51–54	11–5 (1–2)	13 – Boone	9 – Budnik	2 – tied	Robins Center (703); Richmond, VA
January 18, 2023; 6:00 p.m., ESPN+		at Rhode Island	L 49–75	11–6 (1–3)	13 – Doogan	13 – Doogan	3 – tied	Ryan Center (904); Kingston, RI
January 21, 2023; 6:00 p.m., ESPN+		George Mason	W 73–58	12–6 (2–3)	18 – Doogan	12 – Doogan	4 – Townsend	Robins Center (912); Richmond, VA
January 25, 2023; 7:00 p.m., ESPN+		at Fordham	L 59–68	12–7 (2–4)	12 – Hill	11 – Hill	4 – Doogan	Rose Hill Gymnasium (179); The Bronx, NY
January 29, 2023; 4:00 p.m., CBSSN		Saint Joseph's	W 94–90 ^{OT}	13–7 (3–4)	28 – Doogan	6 – Doogan	10 – Townsend	Robins Center (753); Richmond, VA
February 1, 2023; 7:00 p.m., ESPN+		at UMass	L 69–73	13–8 (3–5)	27 – Budnik	9 – Townsend	11 – Townsend	Mullins Center (836); Amherst, MA
February 4, 2023 noon, ESPN+		at Dayton	Canceled due to COVID-19 protocols					UD Arena; Dayton, OH
February 8, 2023; 6:00 p.m., ESPN+		La Salle	W 67–51	14–8 (4–5)	20 – Doogan	10 – Townsend	7 – Townsend	Robins Center (450); Richmond, VA
February 12, 2023; 1:00 p.m., ESPN+		Davidson	W 75–44	15–8 (5–5)	17 – Doogan	6 – Hill	4 – Townsend	Robins Center (786); Richmond, VA
February 15, 2023; 6:00 p.m., ESPN+		Saint Louis	W 84–74	16–8 (6–5)	19 – Doogan	7 – Doogan	7 – Townsend	Robins Center (504); Richmond, VA
February 18, 2023; 2:00 p.m., ESPN+		at Duquesne	L 69–83	16–9 (6–6)	12 – tied	6 – Hill	6 – Townsend	UPMC Cooper Fieldhouse (781); Pittsburgh, PA
February 22, 2023; 6:00 p.m., ESPN+		at VCU	W 53–37	17–9 (7–6)	15 – Townsend	8 – Doogan	4 – Townsend	Siegel Center (904); Richmond, VA
February 25, 2023; 6:00 p.m., ESPN3		St. Bonaventure	W 87–45	18–9 (8–6)	18 – Budnik	7 – Hill	5 – Townsend	Robins Center (1,057); Richmond, VA
Atlantic 10 tournament
March 2, 2023; 1:30 p.m., ESPN+	(5)	vs. (12) Dayton; Second round	W 71–60	19–9	20 – Budnik	10 – Doogan	4 – tied	Chase Fieldhouse (780); Wilmington, DE
March 3, 2023; 1:30 p.m., ESPN+	(5)	vs. (4) Fordham; Quarterfinals	W 70–65	20–9	20 – Doogan	12 – Hill	6 – Townsend	Chase Fieldhouse (1,300); Wilmington, DE
March 4, 2023; 11:00 a.m., CBSSN	(5)	vs. (1) UMass; Semifinals	L 60–80	20–10	25 – Budnik	6 – tied	5 – Townsend	Chase Fieldhouse (1,300); Wilmington, DE
WNIT
March 16, 2023*; 6:00 p.m., ESPN3		Penn; First round	W 75–52	21–10	23 – Budnik	13 – Doogan	5 – Townsend	Robins Center (557); Richmond, VA
March 20, 2023; 6:00 p.m., ESPN3		Rhode Island; Second round	L 64–74	21–11	20 – Budnik	4 – tied	4 – Townsend	Ryan Center (1,222); Kingston, RI
*Non-conference game. ^{#}Rankings from AP poll. (#) Tournament seedings in parentheses. All times are in Eastern.
