= 2023 Atlantic 10 women's basketball tournament =

- Classification: Division I
- Season: 2022–23
- Teams: 15
- Site: Chase Fieldhouse; Wilmington, Delaware
- Champions: Saint Louis (1st title)
- Winning coach: Rebecca Tillett (1st title)
- MVP: Julia Martinez (Saint Louis)
- Attendance: 9,098
- Television: ESPN+, CBSSN, ESPNU

2022–23 Atlantic 10 women's basketball standings
	Conf.				Overall
Team	W		L	PCT	W		L	PCT
Rhode Island	14	–	2	.875	26	–	7	.788
UMass	14	–	2	.875	27	–	7	.794
Fordham	10	–	6	.625	19	–	13	.594
Saint Louis†	10	–	6	.625	17	–	18	.486
Richmond	8	–	6	.571	21	–	11	.656
Saint Joseph's	9	–	7	.563	20	–	11	.645
George Washington	9	–	7	.563	18	–	13	.581
La Salle	8	–	7	.533	17	–	14	.548
Duquesne	8	–	8	.500	19	–	12	.613
George Mason	8	–	8	.500	16	–	15	.516
Davidson	6	–	8	.429	14	–	16	.467
Dayton	5	–	10	.333	7	–	21	.250
VCU	4	–	12	.250	7	–	22	.241
St. Bonaventure	3	–	13	.188	6	–	26	.188
Loyola Chicago	1	–	15	.063	6	–	24	.200
† 2023 A10 Tournament winner As of March 24, 2023

The 2023 Atlantic 10 women's basketball tournament was a postseason women's basketball tournament for the 2022–23 season of the Atlantic 10 Conference (A-10). It was held from March 1–5, 2023, in Wilmington, Delaware at Chase Fieldhouse.

== Seeds ==
All 15 A-10 schools participated in the tournament. Teams were seeded by winning percentage within the conference, with a tiebreaker system to seed teams with identical percentages. The top 9 teams received a first-round bye and the top four teams received a double-bye, automatically advancing them to the quarterfinals.

Seed	School	Conference Record	Tiebreaker
1	Massachusetts	14-2	1-1 vs. Rhode Island; 2-1 vs. Saint Louis & Fordham
2	Rhode Island	14-2	1-1 vs. Massachusetts; 1-1 vs. Saint Louis & Fordham
3	Saint Louis	10-6	1-0 vs. Fordham
4	Fordham	10-6	0-1 vs. Saint Louis
5	Richmond	8-6	
6	Saint Joseph’s	9-7	1-0 vs. George Washington
7	George Washington	9-7	0-1 vs. Saint Joseph’s
8	La Salle	8-7	
9	George Mason	8-8	1-0 vs. Duquesne
10	Duquesne	8-8	0-1 vs. George Mason
11	Davidson	6-8	
12	Dayton	5-10	
13	VCU	4-12	
14	St. Bonaventure	3-13	
15	Loyola-Chicago	1-15	

== Schedule ==
Session	Game	Time	Matchup	Score	Television	Attendance
First round – Wednesday, March 1
1	1	12:00 pm	No. 12 Dayton vs No. 13 VCU	67–61	ESPN+	780
1	2	2:30 pm	No. 10 Duquesne vs No. 15 Loyola Chicago	58–57	ESPN+	780
1	3	5:00 pm	No. 11 Davidson vs No. 14 St. Bonaventure	70–51	ESPN+	780
Second round – Thursday, March 2
2	4	11:00 am	No. 8 La Salle vs No. 9 George Mason	58–64	ESPN+	780
2	5	1:30 pm	No. 5 Richmond vs No. 12 Dayton	71–60	ESPN+	780
3	6	5:00 pm	No. 7 George Washington vs No. 10 Duquesne	71–68	ESPN+	875
3	7	7:30 pm	No. 6 Saint Joseph’s vs No. 11 Davidson	64–53	ESPN+	875
Quarterfinals – Friday, March 3
4	8	11:00 am	No. 1 Massachusetts vs No. 9 George Mason	63–50	ESPN+	1,300
4	9	1:30 pm	No. 4 Fordham vs No. 5 Richmond	65-70	ESPN+	1,300
5	10	5:00 pm	No. 2 Rhode Island vs No. 7 George Washington	68-56	ESPN+	1,109
5	11	7:30 pm	No. 3 Saint Louis vs No. 6 Saint Joseph’s	59-44	ESPN+	1,109
Semifinals – Saturday, March 4
6	12	11:00 am	No. 1 Massachusetts vs No. 5 Richmond	80-60	CBSSN	1,923
6	13	1:30 pm	No. 2 Rhode Island vs No. 3 Saint Louis	56-59	CBSSN	1,923
Championship – Sunday, March 5
7	14	12:00 pm	No. 1 Massachusetts vs No. 3 Saint Louis	85-91^{OT}	ESPNU	2,331

*Game times in Eastern Time.

== Bracket ==
First round Wednesday, March 1 ESPN+
12	Dayton	67
13	VCU	61
10	Duquesne	58
15	Loyola Chicago	57
11	Davidson	70
14	St. Bonaventure	51

Second round Thursday, March 2 ESPN+
8	La Salle	58
9	George Mason	64
5	Richmond	71
12	Dayton	60
7	George Washington	71
10	Duquesne	68
6	Saint Joseph’s	64
11	Davidson	53

Quarterfinals; Friday, March 3 ESPN+
1	Massachusetts	63
9	George Mason	50
4	Fordham	65
5	Richmond	70
2	Rhode Island	68
7	George Washington	56
3	Saint Louis	59
6	Saint Joseph’s	44

Semifinals; Saturday, March 4 CBSSN
1	Massachusetts	80
5	Richmond	60
2	Rhode Island	56
3	Saint Louis	59

Championship; Sunday, March 5 ESPNU
1	Massachusetts	85
3	Saint Louis	91*

* denotes overtime period
