= Rhode Island Rams women's basketball =

American college basketball team

Rhode Island Rams
2026–27 Rhode Island Rams women's basketball team
- University: University of Rhode Island
- First season: 1975
- Head coach: Colleen Mullen (1st season)
- Location: Kingston, Rhode Island
- Arena: Ryan Center (capacity: 7,657)
- Conference: Atlantic 10
- Nickname: Rams
- Colors: Keaney blue, navy blue, and white
- Student section: Ram County
- All-time record: 532–824

NCAA Division I tournament appearances
- 1996, 2026

Conference tournament champions
- 2026

Conference regular-season champions
- 1996, 2023, 2026

Uniforms
Home	Away	Alternate

The Rhode Island Rams women's basketball team is a college basketball program that competes in NCAA Division I and the Atlantic 10 Conference representing the University of Rhode Island.

== History ==
Rhode Island began play in 1975. They have lost in the conference tournament final in 1984, 2003 and 2024. In their lone appearance in the NCAA Tournament 1996, they lost 90–82 to Oklahoma State. The 1996 team finished the season with a record of 21–8, which would stand as the program's best record until the 2022 team finished with a 22–7 record. Several players received Atlantic 10 conference honors from first team to third team, and Rookie of the Year. They won their first ever conference tournament in 2026.

== Postseason ==
=== NCAA Tournament results ===
The Rams have appeared in the NCAA Division I women's basketball tournament twice. Their record is 0–2.

Year	Seed	Round	Opponent	Result
1996	(10)	First Round	(7) Oklahoma State	L 82−90
2026	(11)	First Round	(6) Alabama	L 55−68

=== WNIT results ===
Year	Round	Opponent	Result
2022	First Round	Quinnipiac	L 50–61
2023	First Round; Second Round; Third Round	Boston; Richmond; Harvard	W 46–40; W 74–64; L 64–74
