= Capital City Classic =

American college basketball rivalry

- VCU Rams Richmond Spiders
- Sport: Basketball
- First meeting: January 29, 1976; Richmond 71, VCU 65
- Latest meeting: February 14, 2026; VCU 78, Richmond 67
- Trophy: None

Statistics
- Total meetings: 97
- All-time series: VCU leads, 64–33
- Largest victory: 41 (VCU 90–49, 2025)
- Longest win streak: VCU, 7 (1977–1979)
- Current win streak: VCU, 4 (2025–)

Locations of Richmond and VCU

The Capital City Classic is a men's college basketball series between the VCU Rams and the Richmond Spiders. Both schools are located within Virginia's state capital of Richmond—Virginia Commonwealth University has its non-medical campus in the Fan District at the western edge of downtown and its medical campus in the downtown neighborhood of Court End, while the University of Richmond is located 6 miles (9.7 km) away in the West End on the border with Henrico County. It often has a public school (VCU) vs private school (Richmond) mentality.

From 1995 to 2001, it was a conference rivalry in the Colonial Athletic Association, before Richmond left for the Atlantic 10 Conference (A10). In 2012, it once again became a conference rivalry with VCU's arrival in the A10. The rivalry has been known under a number of different names over the years, including the Black & Blue Classic, before being renamed the Capital City Classic for the 2014–15 season.

== All-time results ==
Richmond victories are shaded in ██ blue. VCU victories shaded in ██ gold.

#	Date	Arena	Winning team		Losing team		Series
1	January 29, 1976	Robins Center	Richmond	71	VCU	65	UR 1–0
2	February 10, 1976	Richmond Coliseum	Richmond	68	VCU	66	UR 2–0
3	December 4, 1976	Richmond Coliseum	Richmond	68	VCU	66	UR 3–0
4	December 30, 1976	Richmond Coliseum	Richmond	58	VCU	55	UR 4–0
5	February 26, 1977	Robins Center	Richmond	78	VCU	75	UR 5–0
6	November 26, 1977	Robins Center	VCU	79	Richmond	62	UR 5–1
7	January 21, 1978	Richmond Coliseum	VCU	82	Richmond	63	UR 5–2
8	February 11, 1978	Richmond Coliseum	VCU	67	Richmond	66	UR 5–3
9	December 7, 1978	Richmond Coliseum	VCU	84	Richmond	71	UR 5–4
10	January 27, 1979	Robins Center	VCU	96	Richmond	92	Tied 5–5
11	December 1, 1979	Robins Center	VCU	69	Richmond	67	VCU 6–5
12	December 29, 1979	Richmond Coliseum	VCU	86	Richmond	71	VCU 7–5
13	February 20, 1980	Robins Center	Richmond	76	VCU	67	VCU 7–6
14	December 9, 1980	Richmond Coliseum	VCU	88	Richmond	76	VCU 8–6
15	January 31, 1981	Robins Center	VCU	66	Richmond	55	VCU 9–6
16	December 30, 1981	Richmond Coliseum	VCU	59	Richmond	53	VCU 10–6
17	February 8, 1982	Richmond Coliseum	VCU	77	Richmond	63	VCU 11–6
18	February 10, 1982	Robins Center	Richmond	64	VCU	59	VCU 11–7
19	December 8, 1982	Richmond Coliseum	VCU	54	Richmond	48	VCU 12–7
20	December 30, 1982	Richmond Coliseum	VCU	80	Richmond	74	VCU 13–7
21	January 8, 1983	Robins Center	VCU	65	Richmond	56	VCU 14–7
22	December 10, 1983	Richmond Coliseum	VCU	59	Richmond	45	VCU 15–7
23	December 30, 1983	Richmond Coliseum	VCU	61	Richmond	47	VCU 16–7
24	February 14, 1984	Robins Center	Richmond	56	VCU	51	VCU 16–8
25	December 4, 1984	Robins Center	VCU	69	Richmond	60	VCU 17–8
26	December 28, 1984	Richmond Coliseum	VCU	68	Richmond	52	VCU 18–8
27	December 3, 1985	Richmond Coliseum	Richmond	64	VCU	59	VCU 18–9
28	December 20, 1985	Richmond Coliseum	Richmond	67	VCU	65	VCU 18–10
29	December 30, 1986	Richmond Coliseum	VCU	60	Richmond	57	VCU 19–10
30	January 22, 1987	Robins Center	VCU	79	Richmond	66	VCU 20–10
31	December 18, 1987	Richmond Coliseum	Richmond	60	VCU	58	VCU 20–11
32	January 4, 1988	Richmond Coliseum	VCU	72	Richmond	53	VCU 21–11
33	December 7, 1988	Robins Center	Richmond	74	VCU	58	VCU 21–12
34	December 6, 1989	Richmond Coliseum	Richmond	66	VCU	54	VCU 21–13
35	December 5, 1990	Robins Center	Richmond	67	VCU	63	VCU 21–14
36	December 29, 1990	Richmond Coliseum	VCU	72	Richmond	66	VCU 22–14
37	December 4, 1991	Robins Center	VCU	73	Richmond	70	VCU 23–14
38	December 28, 1991	Richmond Coliseum	Richmond	72	VCU	71	VCU 23–15
39	December 9, 1992	Robins Center	VCU	82	Richmond	63	VCU 24–15
40	December 18, 1993	Richmond Coliseum	Richmond	76	VCU	61	VCU 24–16
41	January 11, 1995	Robins Center	VCU	78	Richmond	72	VCU 25–16
42	January 20, 1996	Richmond Coliseum	VCU	79	Richmond	51	VCU 26–16
43	February 24, 1996	Robins Center	VCU	69	Richmond	67	VCU 27–16
44	March 2, 1996	Richmond Coliseum (CAA Tournament)	VCU	89	Richmond	55	VCU 28–16
45	January 25, 1997	Robins Center	VCU	86	Richmond	71	VCU 29–16
46	February 24, 1997	Richmond Coliseum	VCU	56	Richmond	45	VCU 30–16
47	January 24, 1998	Robins Center	Richmond	56	VCU	52	VCU 30–17
48	February 21, 1998	Robins Center	Richmond	67	VCU	61	VCU 30–18
49	January 23, 1999	Robins Center	Richmond	68	VCU	64	VCU 30–19
50	February 13, 1999	Richmond Coliseum	Richmond	78	VCU	72	VCU 30–20
51	February 26, 1999	Richmond Coliseum	VCU	64	Richmond	57	VCU 31–20
52	February 8, 2000	Robins Center	Richmond	69	VCU	57	VCU 31–21
53	February 26, 2000	Siegel Center	VCU	80	Richmond	77	VCU 32–21
54	February 17, 2001	Robins Center	Richmond	70	VCU	66	VCU 32–22
55	February 27, 2001	Siegel Center	Richmond	72	VCU	54	VCU 32–23
56	December 1, 2001	Robins Center	VCU	65	Richmond	54	VCU 33–23
57	December 7, 2002	Siegel Center	VCU	73	Richmond	68	VCU 34–23
58	December 3, 2003	Robins Center	Richmond	70	VCU	52	VCU 34–24
59	December 11, 2004	Siegel Center	VCU	58	Richmond	50	VCU 35–24
60	December 10, 2005	Siegel Center	VCU	49	Richmond	37	VCU 36–24
61	December 9, 2006	Robins Center	VCU	68	Richmond	54	VCU 37–24
62	December 8, 2007	Siegel Center	VCU	65	Richmond	45	VCU 38–24
63	December 13, 2008	Robins Center	VCU	77	Richmond	76	VCU 39–24
64	December 12, 2009	Siegel Center	VCU	65	Richmond	57	VCU 40–24
65	December 11, 2010	Robins Center	Richmond	72	VCU	60	VCU 40–25
66	December 9, 2011	Siegel Center	VCU	73	Richmond	51	VCU 41–25
67	January 24, 2013	Robins Center	Richmond	86	VCU	74	VCU 41–26
68	March 6, 2013	Siegel Center	VCU	93	Richmond	82	VCU 42–26
69	February 1, 2014	Siegel Center	VCU	81	Richmond	70	VCU 43–26
70	March 6, 2014	Robins Center	VCU	56	Richmond	50	VCU 44–26
71	March 14, 2014	Barclays Center, Brooklyn, NY (A-10 Tournament)	VCU	71	Richmond	53	VCU 45–26
72	January 31, 2015	Siegel Center	Richmond	64	VCU	55	VCU 45–27
73	February 25, 2015	Robins Center	Richmond	67	VCU	63	VCU 45–28
74	March 13, 2015	Barclays Center, Brooklyn, NY (A-10 Tournament)	VCU	70	Richmond	67	VCU 46–28
75	January 16, 2016	Robins Center	VCU	94	Richmond	89	VCU 47–28
76	February 19, 2016	Siegel Center	VCU	87	Richmond	74	VCU 48–28
77	February 1, 2017	Siegel Center	VCU	81	Richmond	74	VCU 49–28
78	February 17, 2017	Robins Center	VCU	84	Richmond	73	VCU 50–28
79	March 11, 2017	PPG Paints Arena, Pittsburgh, PA (A-10 Tournament)	VCU	87	Richmond	77	VCU 51–28
80	January 17, 2018	Siegel Center	Richmond	67	VCU	52	VCU 51–29
81	February 7, 2018	Robins Center	Richmond	77	VCU	76	VCU 51–30
82	February 13, 2019	Siegel Center	VCU	80	Richmond	61	VCU 52–30
83	March 2, 2019	Robins Center	VCU	69	Richmond	66	VCU 53–30
84	January 28, 2020	Siegel Center	VCU	87	Richmond	68	VCU 54–30
85	February 15, 2020	Robins Center	Richmond	77	VCU	59	VCU 54–31
86	February 17, 2021	Siegel Center	VCU	68	Richmond	56	VCU 55–31
87	January 29, 2022	Robins Center	VCU	64	Richmond	62	VCU 56–31
88	February 18, 2022	Siegel Center	VCU	77	Richmond	57	VCU 57–31
89	March 11, 2022	Capital One Arena, Washington, D.C. (A-10 Tournament)	Richmond	75	VCU	64	VCU 57–32
90	January 20, 2023	Robins Center	VCU	74	Richmond	62	VCU 58–32
91	February 24, 2023	Siegel Center	VCU	73	Richmond	58	VCU 59–32
92	February 3, 2024	Siegel Center	VCU	63	Richmond	52	VCU 60–32
93	March 2, 2024	Robins Center	Richmond	79	VCU	76	VCU 60–33
94	February 1, 2025	Siegel Center	VCU	90	Richmond	49	VCU 61–33
95	February 25, 2025	Robins Center	VCU	78	Richmond	60	VCU 62–33
96	January 27, 2026	Siegel Center	VCU	77	Richmond	69	VCU 63–33
97	February 14, 2026	Robins Center	VCU	78	Richmond	67	VCU 64–33
