= Saint Louis Billikens women's basketball =

Saint Louis Billikens
2026–27 Saint Louis Billikens women's basketball team
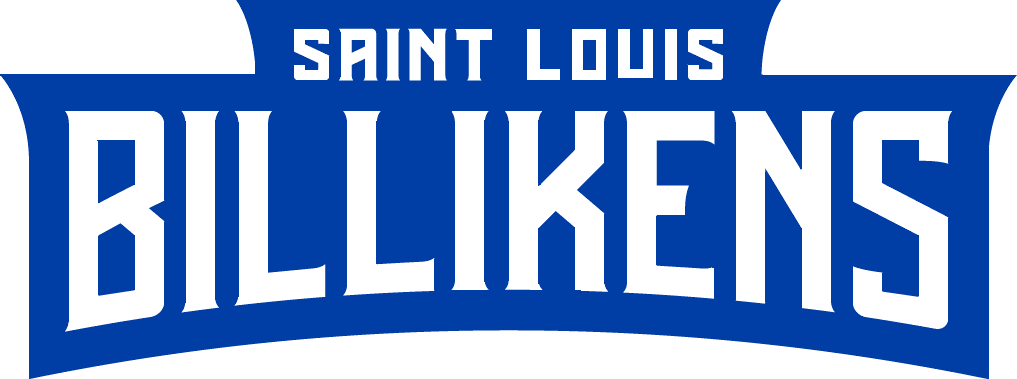
- University: Saint Louis University
- Head coach: Rebecca Tillett (5th season)
- Location: St. Louis, Missouri
- Arena: Chaifetz Arena (capacity: 10,600)
- Conference: Atlantic 10
- Nickname: Billikens
- Colors: SLU blue and white
- Student section: SLUnatics

NCAA Division I tournament appearances
- 2023

Conference tournament champions
- 2023

Conference regular-season champions
- 2016

Uniforms
Home	Away

The Saint Louis Billikens women's basketball team is a college basketball program representing Saint Louis University. They compete in the Atlantic 10 Conference.

== History ==
As of the end of the 2021–22 season, the Bilikens had an all-time record of 552–734. They have made appearances in the WNIT in 2016, 2017, 2018, 2021, and 2024. They were the 2024 WNIT champions .

Season	Record	Coach
1975–76	8–6	Thad Strobach (8–6)
1976–77	6–8	John O’Brien (176–147)
1977–78	15–8	John O’Brien (176–147)
1978–79	18–7	John O’Brien (176–147)
1979–80	18–6	John O’Brien (176–147)
1980–81	15–13	John O’Brien (176–147)
1981–82	11–11	John O’Brien (176–147)
1982–83	14–14	John O’Brien (176–147)
1983–84	16–9	John O’Brien (176–147)
1984–85	16–10	John O’Brien (176–147)
1985–86	16–10	John O’Brien (176–147)
1986–87	12–16	John O’Brien (176–147)
1987–88	11–16	John O’Brien (176–147)
1988–89	8–19	John O’Brien (176–147)
1989–90	3–24	Steve Cochran (3–50)
1990–91	0–26	Steve Cochran (3–50)
1991–92	2–25	Sharon Allen (17–90)
1992–93	5–21	Sharon Allen (17–90)
1993–94	6–21	Sharon Allen (17–90)
1994–95	4–23	Sharon Allen (17–90)
1995–96	6–21	Jill Pizzotti (113–167)
1996–97	10–18	Jill Pizzotti (113–167)
1997–98	13–14	Jill Pizzotti (113–167)
1998–99	16–12	Jill Pizzotti (113–167)
1999-00	11–17	Jill Pizzotti (113–167)
2000–01	14–14	Jill Pizzotti (113–167)
2001–02	14–15	Jill Pizzotti (113–167)
2002–03	17–14	Jill Pizzotti (113–167)
2003–04	8–19	Jill Pizzotti (113–167)
2004–05	4–23	Jill Pizzotti (113–167)
2005–06	7–20	Shimmy Gray-Miller (71–136)
2006–07	13–17	Shimmy Gray-Miller (71–136)
2007–08	10–20	Shimmy Gray-Miller (71–136)
2008–09	12–18	Shimmy Gray-Miller (71–136)
2009–10	11–19	Shimmy Gray-Miller (71–136)
2010–11	7–22	Shimmy Gray-Miller (71–136)
2011–12	11–20	Shimmy Gray-Miller (71–136)
2012–13	12–19	Lisa Stone (164–138)
2013–14	12–18	Lisa Stone (164–138)
2014–15	15–16	Lisa Stone (164–138)
2015–16	26–8	Lisa Stone (164–138)
2016–17	25–9	Lisa Stone (164–138)
2017–18	17–16	Lisa Stone (164–138)
2018–19	15–16	Lisa Stone (164–138)
2019–20	19–13	Lisa Stone (164–138)
2020–21	14–5	Lisa Stone (164–138)
2021–22	9–18	Lisa Stone (164–138)
2022–23	17–17	Rebecca Tillett (39–35)
2023-24	22–18	Rebecca Tillett (39–35)

=== NCAA tournament appearances ===
The Billikens have made 1 appearance in the NCAA Division I women's basketball tournament. Their combined record is 0–1.

Year	Seed	Round	Opponent	Result
2023	#13	First Round	(4) Tennessee	L 50–95

==== WNIT ====
The Saint Louis Billikens have made 5 appearances in the Women's National Invitation Tournament (WNIT). Their combined record is 11-4. They were WNIT champions in 2024.

Year	Round	Opponent	Result
2016	First Round; Second Round; Third Round	Arkansas–Little Rock; Ball State; Western Kentucky	W 70–69; W 59–57; L 76–78^{OT}
2017	First Round; Second Round	IUPUI; Indiana	W 62–57; L 53–71
2018	First Round	Kansas State	L 61–75
2021	First Round; Second Round; Quarterfinals	DePaul; Milwaukee; Northern Iowa	W 74–72; W 64–44; L 50–58
2024	First Round; Second Round; Super 16; Great 8 Semifinals; Championship	Central Arkansas; Northern Iowa; Purdue Ft. Wayne; Wisconsin; Vermont; Minnesota	W 66-61; W 68–64; W 82–78; W 65-60; W 57-54; W 69-50

== Notable players ==
- Denisha Womack, Plays for the St. Louis Surge in the Women's Blue Chip Basketball League.
