= La Salle Explorers women's basketball =

American college basketball team

2026–27 La Salle Explorers women's basketball team
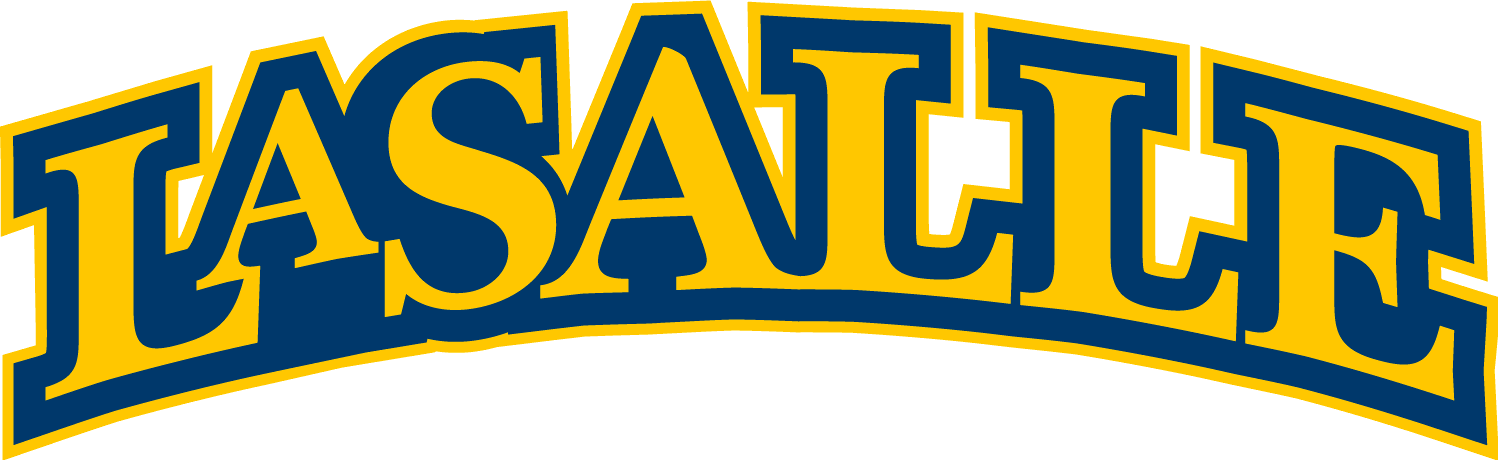
- University: La Salle University
- Head coach: Mountain MacGillivray (9th season)
- Location: Philadelphia, Pennsylvania
- Arena: John Glaser Arena (capacity: 3,000)
- Conference: Atlantic 10
- Nickname: Explorers
- Colors: Blue and gold

NCAA Division I tournament second round
- 1989

NCAA Division I tournament appearances
- 1983, 1986, 1987, 1988, 1989

Conference tournament champions
- 1986

Uniforms
Home	Away	Alternate

The La Salle Explorers women's basketball team is the women's college basketball program representing La Salle University, in Philadelphia, Pennsylvania. The Explorers play in the Atlantic 10 Conference. La Salle has appeared four times in the NCAA tournament, most recently in 1989.

== History ==
As of the 2015–16 season, La Salle has a 655–553 record. The Explorers joined the A10 in 1996 after leaving the Metro Atlantic Athletic Conference in 1992. They were regular season champs of the MAAC in 1987, 1988, 1989, and 1992 (with an appearance in the NCAA Tournament in the first three but not the latter, though they did play in the WNIT). They won the tournament in 1986, which remains their only conference championship.

Season	Coach	Record	Postseason Finish
1972–73	Mary O'Connor	11–4	n/a
1973–74	Mary O'Connor	7–6	n/a
1974–75	Mary O'Connor	5–7	n/a
1975–76	Angie Scarengelli	13–5	n/a
1976–77	Angie Scarengelli	14–8	n/a
1977–78	Angie Scarengell	15–10	n/a
1978–79	Linda Lastowka	14–12	n/a
1979–80	Linda Lastowka	17–11	n/a
1980–81	Kevin Gallagher	17–11	n/a
1981–82	Kevin Gallagher	17–12	n/a
1982–83	Kevin Gallagher	16–13	NCAA First Round
1983–84	Kevin Gallagher	11–18	n/a
1984–85	Speedy Morris	22–8	n/a
1985–86	Speedy Morris	21–9	NCAA First Round
1986–87	John Miller	21–7	NCAA First Round
1987–88	John Miller	25–5	NCAA First Round
1988–89	John Miller	28–3	NCAA Second Round
1989–90	John Miller	15–14	n/a
1990–91	John Miller	16–12	n/a
1991–92	John Miller	25–8	WNIT
1992–93	John Miller	16–11	n/a
1993–94	John Miller	19–9	n/a
1994–95	John Miller	20–10	n/a
1995–96	John Miller	19–10	n/a
1996–97	John Miller	21–7	n/a
1997–98	John Miller	15–13	n/a
1998–99	John Miller	14–14	n/a
1999-00	John Miller	12–17	n/a
2000–01	John Miller	15–14	n/a
2001–02	John Miller	6–22	n/a
2002–03	John Miller	15–14	n/a
2003–04	John Miller	15–13	n/a
2004–05	Tom Lochner	12–16	n/a
2005–06	Tom Lochner	11–17	n/a
2006–07	Tom Lochner	19–11	n/a
2007–08	Tom Lochner	12–17	n/a
2008–09	Tom Lochner	10–19	n/a
2009–10	Tom Lochner	7–22	n/a
2010–11	Jeff Williams	10–20	n/a
2011–12	Jeff Williams	14–17	n/a
2012–13	Jeff Williams	8–21	n/a
2013–14	Jeff Williams	15–15	n/a
2014–15	Jeff Williams	15–16	n/a
2015–16	Jeff Williams	5–25	n/a
2016–17	Jeff Williams	17–13	n/a
2017–18	Jeff Williams	8–22	n/a
2018–19	Mountain MacGillivray	6–25	n/a
2019–20	Mountain MacGillivray	13–17	n/a
2020–21	Mountain MacGillivray	12–14	n/a
2021–22	Mountain MacGillivray	16–12	n/a
2022–23	Mountain MacGillivray	17–14	n/a
2023–24	Mountain MacGillivray	8–22	n/a
2024–25	Mountain MacGillivray	10–23	n/a
2025–26	Mountain MacGillivray	18–13	WNIT

== NCAA tournament results ==
Year	Seed	Round	Opponent	Result
1983	#8	Play-in Game	#9 South Carolina State	L 67–85
1986	#10	First Round	#7 Villanova	L 55–60
1988	#8	First Round	#9 Penn State	L 85–86
1989	#9	First Round; Second Round	#8 Connecticut #1 Tennessee	W 72–63; L 61–91
