= Richmond Spiders women's basketball =

2026–27 Richmond Spiders women's basketball team
- University: University of Richmond
- Head coach: Alisa Kresge (1st season)
- Location: Richmond, Virginia
- Arena: Robins Center (capacity: 7,201)
- Conference: Atlantic 10
- Nickname: Spiders
- Colors: Blue and red

NCAA Division I tournament second round
- 2025

NCAA Division I tournament appearances
- 1990, 1991, 2005, 2024, 2025, 2026

Conference tournament champions
- CAA; 1990, 1991; A10; 2024

Conference regular-season champions
- CAA; 1984, 1990; A10; 2024, 2025

Uniforms
Home	Away	Alternate

The Richmond Spiders women's basketball team represents the University of Richmond in Richmond, Virginia and currently competes in the Atlantic 10 Conference. The team plays its home games at the Robins Center.

== History ==
Richmond began play in 1919. They were a member of the ECAC South from 1983 to 1985. They joined the Colonial Athletic Association in 1985. During their time in the CAA, they won two tournament titles, beating James Madison 47–46 in 1990 and East Carolina 88–70, while finishing as runner up in 1984 (losing 54–39 to East Carolina) and 1989 (losing 55–45 to James Madison). They also won the regular season title in 1984 and 1990. They joined the Atlantic-10 Conference in 2001. The Spiders have made the NCAA Tournament six times (1990, 1991, 2005, 2024, 2025, 2026) and the Women's National Invitation Tournament ten times (1989, 2003, 2004, 2009, 2010, 2011, 2012, 2013, 2015, 2023). As of the end of the 2025–26 season, the Spiders have an all-time record of 1,066–757–7.

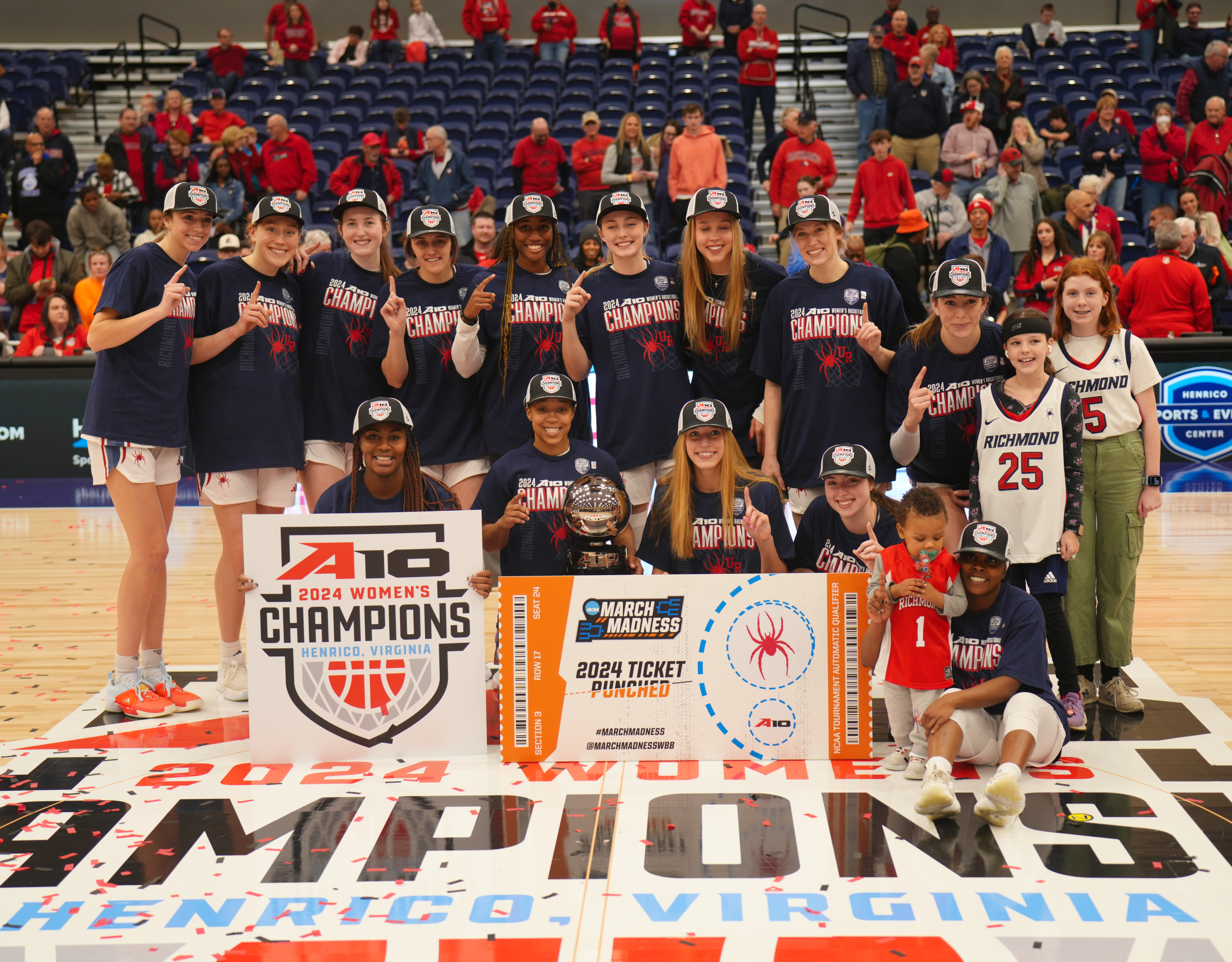
A10 2024 Women's Basketball Champions - Richmond Spiders

== NCAA tournament results ==
The Spiders have appeared in the NCAA Tournament six times. Their combined record is 1–6.

Year	Seed	Round	Opponent	Result
1990	10	First Round	(7) Tennessee Tech	L 59–77
1991	7	First Round	(10) George Washington	L 62–73
2005	11	First Round	(6) Florida State	L 54–87
2024	10	First Round	(7) Duke	L 61–72
2025	8	First Round; Second Round	(9) Georgia Tech (1) UCLA	W 74–49; L 67–84
2026	11	First Four	(11) Nebraska	L 56–75
