= 2020–21 VCU Rams women's basketball team =

Intercollegiate basketball season

2020–21 VCU Rams women's basketball

Atlantic 10 tournament champions

NCAA tournament, First round
- Conference: Atlantic 10 Conference
- Record: 16–11 (10–5 A-10)
- Head coach: Beth O'Boyle (7th season)
- Assistant coaches: Kirk Crawford; Terry Zeh; Morgan Williams
- Home arena: Siegel Center

2020–21 Atlantic 10 women's basketball standings
	Conf.				Overall
Team	W		L	PCT	W		L	PCT
Dayton	12	–	1	.923	14	–	5	.737
Fordham	8	–	2	.800	12	–	6	.667
Rhode Island	11	–	4	.733	11	–	8	.579
Saint Louis	9	–	3	.750	14	–	6	.700
VCU †	10	–	5	.667	16	–	11	.593
Richmond	9	–	6	.600	13	–	9	.591
UMass	7	–	5	.583	16	–	8	.667
Duquesne	4	–	7	.364	5	–	11	.313
Saint Joseph's	5	–	9	.357	7	–	10	.412
George Washington	5	–	9	.357	9	–	14	.391
La Salle	6	–	11	.353	11	–	15	.423
St. Bonaventure	6	–	11	.353	8	–	13	.381
Davidson	5	–	10	.333	8	–	15	.348
George Mason	0	–	14	.000	3	–	19	.136
† 2021 A10 Tournament winner As of July 7, 2024; Rankings from AP poll

The 2020–21 VCU Rams women's basketball team represented Virginia Commonwealth University during the 2020–21 NCAA Division I women's basketball season. It was the program's 47th season of existence, and their eighth season in the Atlantic 10 Conference. The Rams were led by seventh year head coach Beth O'Boyle and played their home games at the Stuart C. Siegel Center.

== Previous season ==
VCU finished the 2019–20 season with an 20–12 record and a 13–3 record in Atlantic 10 play, finishing second in the Atlantic 10. VCU were seeded second in the 2020 Atlantic 10 women's basketball tournament, where they defeated Davidson and Fordham en route to the Atlantic 10 Championship. There, they lost to Dayton in the final. VCU was considered a potential at-large bid for the 2020 Women's National Invitation Tournament, but all postseason tournaments were cancelled by the NCAA due to rising concerns with the COVID-19 pandemic.

== Offseason ==
=== Departures ===
Name	Number	Pos.	Height	Year	Hometown	Notes
K.K. Tassin	0	G	5 ft 9 in (1.75 m)	Senior	Byram, Mississippi	Graduated
Danielle Hammond	30	C	6 ft 4 in (1.93 m)	Senior	Philadelphia, Pennsylvania	Graduated
Nyra Williams	34	G	5 ft 5 in (1.65 m)	Senior	Hampton, Virginia	Graduated

=== Transfers ===
Name	Number	Pos.	Height	Year	Hometown	Notes
Janika Griffith-Wallace	2	G	5 ft 9 in (1.75 m)	RS-Junior	Brampton, Ontario, Canada	Transferred from Murray State
Chloe Bloom	13	F	6 ft 3 in (1.91 m)	Sophomore	Wedderburn, Victoria, Australia	Transferred from Oklahoma
Samantha Robinson	35	F	6 ft 1 in (1.85 m)	RS-Sophomore	Bradford, Ontario, Canada	Transferred from Central Michigan

=== 2020 recruiting class ===
College recruiting information
Name	Hometown	School	Height	Weight	Commit date
Camila Contreras; C	Socorro, TX	San Elizario High School	6 ft 4 in (1.93 m)	N/A	Sep 15, 2019
Camila Contreras; C	Recruit ratings: Scout: Rivals: 247Sports: (NR)				
Rain Green; PG	Baltimore, MD	Roland Park Country School	5 ft 6 in (1.68 m)	N/A	Apr 14, 2019
Rain Green; PG	Recruit ratings: Scout: Rivals: 247Sports: (NR)				
Elze Motekaityte; PF	Klaipėda, LTU	New Hope Academy	6 ft 2 in (1.88 m)	N/A	Nov 14, 2019
Elze Motekaityte; PF	Recruit ratings: Scout: Rivals: 247Sports: (NR)				
Sarah Te-Biasu; PG	Montreal, QC	Niagara Prep	5 ft 5 in (1.65 m)	N/A	Nov 25, 2019
Sarah Te-Biasu; PG	Recruit ratings: Scout: Rivals: 247Sports: (NR)				
Dasia Townes; SG	Baltimore, MD	Baltimore Polytechnic Institute	5 ft 11 in (1.80 m)	N/A	Nov 14, 2019
Dasia Townes; SG	Recruit ratings: Scout: Rivals: 247Sports: (NR)				
Overall recruit ranking:
Note: In many cases, Scout, Rivals, 247Sports, On3, and ESPN may conflict in their listings of height and weight.; In these cases, the average was taken. ESPN grades are on a 100-point scale.; Sources: "VCU 2020 Player Commits". ESPN.; "2020 Team Ranking". Rivals.

== Preseason ==
=== A10 media poll ===
The Atlantic 10 men's basketball media poll was released on November 9, 2020. VCU was picked to win the regular season.

A10 Women's Basketball Preseason Poll
Predicted finish	Team	Points	1st Votes
1	VCU	185	10
2	Dayton	176	2
3	Saint Louis	171	1
4	Davidson	140	0
4	Duquesne	140	1
4	Fordham	140	0
7	UMass	118	0
8	Richmond	81	0
9	George Washington	78	0
10	La Salle	70	0
11	Rhode Island	65	0
12	St. Bonaventure	42	0
13	Saint Joseph's	41	0
14	George Mason	23	0

=== Preseason honors ===
Recipient	Award	Ref.
Tera Reed	Atlantic 10 Preseason First-Team	
Taya Robinson	Atlantic 10 Preseason Second-Team	
Taya Robinson	Atlantic 10 Preseason Defensive Team	

== Roster ==
2020–21 VCU Rams women's basketball team
Players
Coaches

Pos.	#	Name	Height	Year	Previous school	Hometown
G	0	Sarah Te-Biasu	5 ft 5 in (1.65 m)	Fr	Niagara Prep	Montreal, Quebec
G	1	Taya Robinson	5 ft 10 in (1.78 m)	Sr	Huguenot	Richmond, Virginia
G	2	Janika Griffith-Wallace	5 ft 9 in (1.75 m)	RS Jr	Murray State	Brampton, Ontario
G	3	Madison Hattix-Covington	5 ft 10 in (1.78 m)	RS Jr	Ellison	Killeen, Texas
G	5	Olga Petrova	5 ft 8 in (1.73 m)	Sr	Dynamo Moscow	Rostov, Russia
G	12	Dasia Townes	5 ft 11 in (1.8 m)	Fr	Baltimore Poly	Baltimore, Maryland
C	13	Chloe Bloom	6 ft 3 in (1.91 m)	So	Oklahoma	Wedderburn, Australia
C	15	Sofya Pashigoreva	6 ft 6 in (1.98 m)	Sr		Moscow, Russia
G	20	Sofya Nelson	5 ft 7 in (1.7 m)	So	King's Christian	Blackwood, New Jersey
F	22	Sydnei Archie	5 ft 10 in (1.78 m)	Sr	St. Catherine's (VA)	Richmond, Virginia

Head coach

- Beth O'Boyle (Rochester)

Assistant coach(es)

- Kirk Crawford (Western Colorado)
- Terry Zeh (St. Bonaventure)
- Morgan Williams (VCU)

Legend

- (C) Team captain
- (S) Suspended
- (I) Ineligible
- (W) Walk-on
- Injured
- Current redshirt

Roster
Last update: December 18, 2020

== Schedule ==
Date time, TV	Rank^{#}	Opponent^{#}	Result	Record	High points	High rebounds	High assists	Site (attendance) city, state
Non-conference regular season
November 25, 2020*; 9:30 p.m., FBL		vs. Saint Mary's; Arizona State MTE	W 87–79	1–0	22 – Reed	7 – T. Robinson	5 – Te-Biasu	Desert Financial Arena (199); Tempe, AZ
November 27, 2020*; 6:30 p.m., P12N		at Arizona State; Arizona State MTE	L 40–49	1–1	16 – Hattix-Covington	8 – Te-Biasu	4 – Te-Biasu	Desert Financial Arena (68); Tempe, AZ
November 28, 2020*; 3:00 p.m., FBL		vs. Stephen F. Austin; Arizona State MTE	L 66–71	1–2	19 – Griffith-Wallace	5 – Tied	2 – Hattix-Covington	Desert Financial Arena (0); Tempe, AZ
December 3, 2020*; 5:00 p.m., ESPN+		Buffalo	W 61–55	2–2	20 – T. Robinson	10 – Archie	4 – Te-Biasu	Siegel Center (72); Richmond, VA
December 6, 2020*; 2:00 p.m., CUSATV		at Old Dominion; Rivalry	L 76–81	2–3	18 – Te-Biasu	8 – Archie	4 – Tied	Chartway Arena (250); Norfolk, VA
December 9, 2020*; 4:00 p.m., ESPN+		at East Carolina	L 55–58	2–4	13 – Tied	6 – Tied	6 – T. Robinson	Minges Coliseum (0); Greenville, NC
December 17, 2020*; 3:00 p.m., SECN+		at Vanderbilt	L 80–91	2–5	21 – Reed	10 – T. Robinson	4 – Reed	Memorial Gymnasium (46); Nashville, TN
Atlantic 10 regular season
December 20, 2020; 6:00 p.m., ESPN+		at Richmond; Capital City Classic	W 73–49	3–5 (1–0)	15 – T. Robinson	12 – Archie	4 – Reed	Robins Center (0); Richmond, VA
January 8, 2021; 6:00 p.m., ESPN+		at Duquesne	W 68–63 ^{OT}	4–5 (2–0)	16 – Tied	9 – Tied	5 – Reed	Palumbo Center (0); Pittsburgh, PA
January 10, 2021; 12:00 p.m., ESPN+		at St. Bonaventure	W 69–67 ^{OT}	5–5 (3–0)	17 – Archie	10 – Archie	2 – Tied	Reilly Center (0); Olean, NY
January 13, 2021; 6:00 p.m., ESPN+		George Mason; Mason rivalry	W 60–41	6–5 (4–0)	11 – Reed	7 – Te-Biasu	2 – Archie	Siegel Center (50); Richmond, VA
January 15, 2021; 6:00 p.m., ESPN+		UMass	L 49–55	6–6 (4–1)	14 – T. Robinson	–	–	Siegel Center (111); Richmond, VA
January 24, 2021; 1:00 p.m., ESPN+		Richmond; Capital City Classic	L 64–69	6–7 (4–2)	16 – T. Robinson	6 – T. Robinson	5 – Reed	Siegel Center (123); Richmond, VA
January 27, 2021; 6:00 p.m., ESPN+		George Washington	W 67–60	7–7 (5–2)	–	–	–	Siegel Center; Richmond, VA
January 29, 2021; 6:00 p.m.		at George Mason; Mason rivalry	W 64–56	8–7 (6–2)	–	–	–	EagleBank Arena; Fairfax, VA
February 1, 2021; 2:00 p.m.		at George Washington	W 64–50	9–7 (7–2)	–	–	–	Charles E. Smith Center; Washington, DC
February 5, 2021; 6:00 p.m., ESPN+		Davidson	Canceled due to COVID-19 protocols					Siegel Center; Richmond, VA
February 7, 2021; 1:00 p.m., ESPN+		Fordham	Canceled due to COVID-19 protocols					Siegel Center; Richmond, VA
February 12, 2021; 6:00 p.m., ESPN+		at Saint Louis	L 50–66	9–8 (7–3)	–	–	–	Chaifetz Arena; St. Louis, MO
February 14, 2021; 12:00 p.m., ESPNU		at Dayton	L 62–67	9–9 (7–4)	18 – T. Robinson	7 – Pashigoreva	4 – Reed	UD Arena (0); Dayton, OH
February 18, 2021; 6:00 p.m., ESPN+		La Salle	W 63–62	10–9 (8–4)	13 – Te-Biasu	9 – Reed	5 – Te-Biasu	Siegel Center (63); Richmond, VA
February 20, 2021; 7:30 p.m., ESPN+		Saint Joseph's	W 64–49	11–9 (9–4)	16 – T. Robinson	6 – S. Robinson	3 – Te-Biasu	Siegel Center (163); Richmond, VA
February 26, 2021; 7:30 p.m., ESPN+		at UMass	W 72–69	12–9 (10–4)	17 – T. Robinson	8 – T. Robinson	6 – Tied	Mullins Center (0); Amherst, MA
February 28, 2021; 1:00 p.m., ESPN+		at Rhode Island	L 68–87	12–10 (10–5)	18 – Robinson	4 – Tied	8 – Reed	Ryan Center (0); Kingston, RI
Atlantic 10 Tournament
March 11, 2021; 2:00 p.m., ESPN+	(5)	(12) Davidson; Second round	W 69–52	13–10	20 – Reed	16 – Bloom	3 – Te-Biasu	Siegel Center (250); Richmond, VA
March 12, 2021; 2:00 p.m., ESPN+	(5)	(4) Rhode Island; Quarterfinals	W 64–57	14–10	24 – T. Robinson	10 – Bloom	3 – Griffith-Wallace	Siegel Center (250); Richmond, VA
March 13, 2021; 1:00 p.m., CBSSN	(5)	(1) Dayton; Semifinals	W 56–50	15–10	18 – T. Robinson	9 – S. Robinson	3 – Reed	Siegel Center (250); Richmond, VA
March 14, 2021; 12:00 p.m., ESPNU	(5)	(7) UMass; Championship	W 81–69	16–10	19 – Tied	5 – Tied	3 – Reed	Siegel Center (250); Richmond, VA
NCAA Women's Tournament
March 22, 2021; 2:00 p.m., ESPNU	(13)	vs. (4) No. 12 Indiana; First round	L 32–63	16–11	8 – Tied	9 – Reed	4 – Te-Biasu	UTSA Convocation Center; San Antonio, TX
*Non-conference game. ^{#}Rankings from AP Poll. (#) Tournament seedings in parentheses. All times are in Eastern Time.

== See also ==
- 2020–21 VCU Rams men's basketball team
