= 2021–22 Richmond Spiders women's basketball team =

Intercollegiate basketball season

2021–22 Richmond Spiders women's basketball
- Conference: Atlantic 10 Conference
- Record: 16–14 (7–9 A-10)
- Head coach: Aaron Roussell (3rd season)
- Assistant coaches: Jeanine Radice; Darren Guensch; Brittany Pinkney
- Home arena: Robins Center

2021–22 Atlantic 10 women's basketball standings
	Conf.				Overall
Team	W		L	PCT	W		L	PCT
Dayton	14	–	1	.933	25	–	6	.806
Rhode Island	12	–	2	.857	22	–	7	.759
UMass †	11	–	4	.733	26	–	7	.788
VCU	9	–	5	.643	16	–	12	.571
La Salle	9	–	6	.600	16	–	12	.571
Fordham	8	–	6	.571	18	–	11	.621
Saint Joseph's	7	–	8	.467	13	–	17	.433
Richmond	7	–	9	.438	16	–	14	.533
Davidson	6	–	10	.375	18	–	15	.545
Duquesne	6	–	10	.375	11	–	18	.379
Saint Louis	5	–	9	.357	9	–	18	.333
George Washington	4	–	11	.267	13	–	18	.419
St. Bonaventure	4	–	12	.250	12	–	16	.429
George Mason	3	–	12	.200	10	–	19	.345
† 2022 A10 Tournament winner

The 2021–22 Richmond Spiders women's basketball team represented the University of Richmond during the 2021–22 NCAA Division I women's basketball season. The Spiders, led by third-year head coach Aaron Roussell, played their home games at the Robins Center and were members of the Atlantic 10 Conference.

== Previous season ==
The Spiders finished the 2020–21 season with a record of 13–9, 9–6 in A-10 play to finish in sixth place. In the A-10 women's tournament, they defeated No. 11 seed George Washington in the second round before falling to No. 3 seed Saint Louis in the quarterfinals, with both games requiring overtime.

== Roster ==
2021–22 Richmond Spiders women's basketball team
Players
Coaches

Pos.	#	Name	Height	Year	Previous school	Hometown
G	0	Sydney Boone	5 ft 8 in (1.73 m)	Fr	Highland Springs	Richmond, VA
G	1	Grace Townsend	5 ft 5 in (1.65 m)	So	James River	Midlothian, VA
G	2	Aniyah Carpenter	5 ft 8 in (1.73 m)	Sr	Roland Park Country	Baltimore, MD
G	3	Celia Satter	6 ft 0 in (1.83 m)	Jr	Loyola Academy	Glencoe, IL
F	10	Madelyn Neff	6 ft 1 in (1.85 m)	Sr	Hayward	Hayward, WI
F	11	Cayla Williams	6 ft 2 in (1.88 m)	Fr	Episcopal	Gainesville, VA
G	12	Claire Holt	5 ft 8 in (1.73 m)	Sr	Spain Park	Hoover, AL
F	15	Emma Squires	6 ft 2 in (1.88 m)	Sr	Tabor Academy	Kingston, MA
F	20	Addie Budnik	6 ft 2 in (1.88 m)	So	Highland Park	Highland Park, IL
G	21	Kylee Lewandowski	6 ft 1 in (1.85 m)	So	North Catholic	Pittsburgh, PA
G	22	Molly Mraz	5 ft 8 in (1.73 m)	Sr	Villa Maria	Erie, PA
G	24	Kate Klimkiewicz	6 ft 0 in (1.83 m)	Sr	Paul VI; Boston College	Oakton, VA
G	25	Katie Hill	6 ft 0 in (1.83 m)	Fr	Saint John Vianney	Colts Neck, NJ
F	31	Elaina Chapman	6 ft 3 in (1.91 m)	Jr	Trinity Episcopal	Richmond, VA
G	32	Siobhan Ryan	6 ft 0 in (1.83 m)	So	Sacred Heart	Buffalo, NY
F	33	Maya Ettle	6 ft 4 in (1.93 m)	So	Moravian	Bethlehem, PA
G	41	Angel Burgos	5 ft 8 in (1.73 m)	Jr	Trinity Episcopal	Richmond, VA

Head coach

- Aaron Roussell (Iowa)

Assistant coach(es)

- Jeanine Radice (Fordham)
- Darren Guensch (Radford)
- Brittany Pinkney (VCU)

Legend

- (C) Team captain
- (S) Suspended
- (I) Ineligible
- (W) Walk-on
- Injured
- Current redshirt

Roster
Last update: May 12, 2022

== Schedule ==
Richmond's 2021–22 non-conference schedule featured 13 games, including a pair of games in the Cavalier Classic in Charlottesville, Virginia, and another pair in the FAU Pre-Christmas Tournament in Boca Raton, Florida.

In the Atlantic 10 portion of the schedule, Richmond played a total of 16 games, including home and away games against VCU, Duquesne, and La Salle. In addition, Richmond hosted Massachusetts, Dayton, Davidson, Rhode Island and Fordham, while the Spiders traveled to George Washington, Saint Joseph's, George Mason, Saint Louis, and St. Bonaventure.

The Spiders finished in eighth place in Atlantic 10 play and faced No. 9 seed Davidson in the second round of the A-10 women's tournament, falling by a score of 66–62.

Date time, TV	Rank^{#}	Opponent^{#}	Result	Record	High points	High rebounds	High assists	Site (attendance) city, state
Non-conference regular season
Nov 9, 2021*; 3:00 p.m., ESPN+		Charlotte	L 45–63	0–1	16 – Budnik	10 – Budnik	3 – Tied	Robins Center (633); Richmond, VA
Nov 13, 2021*; 5:00 p.m., ESPN+		at Hampton	W 96–47	1–1	16 – Tied	11 – Lewandowski	4 – Tied	Hampton Convocation Center; Hampton, VA
Nov 18, 2021*; 6:00 p.m., ESPN+		Elon	L 50–71	1–2	15 – Budnik	7 – Budnik	3 – Budnik	Robins Center (653); Richmond, VA
Nov 21, 2021*; 2:00 p.m., ESPN+		UMBC	W 76–64	2–2	23 – Budnik	7 – Budnik	7 – Townsend	Robins Center (649); Richmond, VA
Nov 26, 2021*; 2:30 p.m., ACCNX		vs. Long Beach State; Cavalier Classic	L 44–52	2–3	14 – Budnik	12 – Klimkiewicz	5 – Klimkiewicz	John Paul Jones Arena (1,498); Charlottesville, VA
Nov 28, 2021*; 2:30 p.m., ACCN		at Virginia; Cavalier Classic	W 74–65	3–3	20 – Budnik	7 – Klimkiewicz	9 – Townsend	John Paul Jones Arena (1,670); Charlottesville, VA
Dec 1, 2021*; 6:00 p.m., ESPN+		Maryland Eastern Shore	W 69–59	4–3	20 – Budnik	9 – Klimkiewicz	6 – Townsend	Robins Center (368); Richmond, VA
Dec 4, 2021*; 1:00 p.m., ESPN+		at Ohio	L 89–98	4–4	28 – Squires	10 – Squires	10 – Townsend	Convocation Center; Athens, OH
Dec 12, 2021*; 2:00 p.m., ESPN+		William & Mary	W 90–52	5–4	14 – Klimkiewicz	6 – Tied	7 – Townsend	Robins Center (755); Richmond, VA
Dec 15, 2021*; 7:00 p.m., ESPN+		at Longwood	W 83–70	6–4	24 – Ryan	8 – Klimkiewicz	4 – Tied	Willett Hall (208); Farmville, VA
Dec 19, 2021* noon		at Florida Atlantic; FAU Pre-Christmas Tournament	W 81–63	7–4	28 – Squires	6 – Ryan	8 – Townsend	FAU Arena (407); Boca Raton, FL
Dec 20, 2021* noon		vs. Southern Miss; FAU Pre-Christmas Tournament	W 87–75	8–4	25 – Ryan	7 – Budnik	9 – Townsend	FAU Arena (360); Boca Raton, FL
Dec 29, 2021*; 6:00 p.m., ESPN+		Coppin State	W 90–50	9–4	15 – Klimkiewicz	7 – Tied	6 – Townsend	Robins Center (565); Richmond, VA
Atlantic 10 regular season
Jan 1, 2022; 4:00 p.m., ESPN+		Duquesne	W 82–76	10–4 (1–0)	20 – Klimkiewicz	7 – Budnik	4 – Townsend	Robins Center (545); Richmond, VA
Jan 5, 2022 noon, ESPN+		at George Washington	W 66–63	11–4 (2–0)	20 – Klimkiewicz	8 – Klimkiewicz	4 – Townsend	Charles E. Smith Center; Washington, D.C.
Jan 12, 2022; 7:00 p.m., ESPN+		at Saint Joseph's	L 54–74	11–5 (2–1)	11 – Tied	7 – Tied	2 – Townsend	Hagan Arena (422); Philadelphia, PA
Jan 15, 2022; 4:00 p.m., ESPN+		UMass	L 72–73 ^{OT}	11–6 (2–2)	20 – Budnik	10 – Klimkiewicz	7 – Townsend	Robins Center (450); Richmond, VA
Jan 19, 2022; 7:00 p.m., ESPN+		at George Mason	W 78–64	12–6 (3–2)	21 – Budnik	8 – Townsend	7 – Townsend	EagleBank Arena (604); Fairfax, VA
Jan 23, 2022; 2:00 p.m., ESPN+		at La Salle	L 57–77	12–7 (3–3)	15 – Klimkewicz	7 – Tied	2 – Tied	Tom Gola Arena (512); Philadelphia, PA
Jan 26, 2022; 6:00 p.m., ESPN+		Dayton	L 57–80	12–8 (3–4)	16 – Townsend	6 – Townsend	3 – Townsend	Robins Center (505); Richmond, VA
Jan 30, 2022; 2:00 p.m., CBSSN		at Saint Louis	W 61–54	13–8 (4–4)	17 – Budnik	7 – Townsend	6 – Townsend	Chaifetz Arena (814); St. Louis, MO
Feb 2, 2022; 6:00 p.m., ESPN+		VCU; National Girls and Women in Sports Day Celebration	L 68–72	13–9 (4–5)	17 – Townsend	5 – Tied	5 – Townsend	Robins Center (1,239); Richmond, VA
Feb 5, 2022; 1:00 p.m., ESPN+		at St. Bonaventure	L 66–74	13–10 (4–6)	22 – Squires	12 – Klimkiewicz	4 – Holt	Reilly Center (258); St. Bonaventure, NY
Feb 9, 2022; 6:00 p.m., ESPN+		Davidson; Rescheduled from January 8 due to COVID-19 protocols	L 71–77	13–11 (4–7)	18 – Holt	7 – Klimkiewicz	5 – Tied	Robins Center (565); Richmond, VA
Feb 13, 2022; 2:00 p.m., ESPN+		La Salle	W 75–58	14–11 (5–7)	26 – Klimkiewicz	10 – Klimkiewicz	7 – Townsend	Robins Center (1,033); Richmond, VA
Feb 16, 2022; 5:00 p.m., ESPN+		at Duquesne	L 68–80	14–12 (5–8)	20 – Budnik	8 – Budnik	8 – Townsend	UPMC Cooper Fieldhouse (618); Pittsburgh, PA
Feb 19, 2022; 4:00 p.m., ESPN+		Rhode Island	L 66–69	14–13 (5–9)	27 – Squires	6 – Tied	9 – Townsend	Robins Center (1,135); Richmond, VA
Feb 23, 2022; 6:00 p.m., ESPN+		Fordham	W 79–69	15–13 (6–9)	25 – Townsend	13 – Townsend	3 – Tied	Robins Center (1,068); Richmond, VA
Feb 26, 2022; 1:00 p.m.		at VCU	W 59–57	16–13 (7–9)	21 – Squires	9 – Budnik	3 – Townsend	Siegel Center (2,046); Richmond, VA
Atlantic 10 Tournament
Mar 3, 2022; 11:00 a.m., ESPN+	(8)	vs. (9) Davidson; Second round	L 62–66	16–14	19 – Budnik	8 – Townsend	8 – Townsend	Chase Fieldhouse; Wilmington, DE
*Non-conference game. ^{#}Rankings from AP Poll. (#) Tournament seedings in parentheses. All times are in Eastern Time.
