= 2022 Atlantic 10 women's basketball tournament =

- Classification: Division I
- Season: 2021–22
- Teams: 14
- Site: Chase Fieldhouse; Wilmington, Delaware
- Attendance: 9,001
- Television: ESPN+, CBSSN, ESPN2

The 2022 Atlantic 10 women's basketball tournament (A-10) is the postseason women's basketball tournament for the Atlantic 10 Conference's 2021–22 season. It is being held from March 2 through March 6, 2022, at the Chase Fieldhouse in Wilmington, Delaware.

2021–22 Atlantic 10 women's basketball standings
	Conf.				Overall
Team	W		L	PCT	W		L	PCT
Dayton	14	–	1	.933	25	–	6	.806
Rhode Island	12	–	2	.857	22	–	7	.759
UMass †	11	–	4	.733	26	–	7	.788
VCU	9	–	5	.643	16	–	12	.571
La Salle	9	–	6	.600	16	–	12	.571
Fordham	8	–	6	.571	18	–	11	.621
Saint Joseph's	7	–	8	.467	13	–	17	.433
Richmond	7	–	9	.438	16	–	14	.533
Davidson	6	–	10	.375	18	–	15	.545
Duquesne	6	–	10	.375	11	–	18	.379
Saint Louis	5	–	9	.357	9	–	18	.333
George Washington	4	–	11	.267	13	–	18	.419
St. Bonaventure	4	–	12	.250	12	–	16	.429
George Mason	3	–	12	.200	10	–	19	.345
† 2022 A10 Tournament winner

== Seeds ==
All 14 A-10 schools are participating in the tournament. Teams are seeded by winning percentage within the conference, with a tiebreaker system to seed teams with identical percentages. The top 10 teams receive a first-round bye and the top four teams receive a double-bye, automatically advancing them to the quarterfinals.

Seed	School	Conference Record	Tiebreaker
1	Dayton	14–1	
2	Rhode Island	12–2	
3	UMass	11–4	
4	VCU	9–6	
5	La Salle	9–6	
6	Fordham	8–6	
7	Saint Joseph's	7–8	
8	Richmond	7–9	
9	Davidson	6–10	1–0 vs. Duquesne
10	Duquesne	6–10	0–1 vs. Davidson
11	Saint Louis	5–9	
12	George Washington	4–11	
13	St. Bonaventure	4–12	
14	George Mason	3–12	

== Schedule ==
Session	Game	Time	Matchup	Score	Television	Attendance
First round – Wednesday, March 2
1	1	1:30 pm	#12 George Washington vs. #13 St. Bonaventure	54–49	ESPN+	816
1	2	4:00 pm	#11 Saint Louis vs. #14 George Mason	50–65	ESPN+	816
Second round – Thursday, March 3
2	3	11:00 am	#8 Richmond vs. #9 Davidson	62–66	ESPN+	813
2	4	1:30 pm	#5 La Salle vs #12 George Washington	54–64	ESPN+	813
3	5	5:00 pm	#7 Saint Joseph's vs. #10 Duquesne	65–49	ESPN+	970
3	6	7:30 pm	#6 Fordham vs #14 George Mason	66–50	ESPN+	970
Quarterfinals – Friday, March 4
4	7	11:00 am	#1 Dayton vs #9 Davidson	60–55	ESPN+	1,014
4	8	1:30 pm	#4 VCU vs #12 George Washington	55–47	ESPN+	1,014
5	9	5:00 pm	#2 Rhode Island vs #7 Saint Joseph's	48–51	ESPN+	1,148
5	10	7:30 pm	#3 UMass vs #6 Fordham	66–63	ESPN+	1,148
Semifinals – Saturday, March 5
6	11	11:00 am	#1 Dayton vs #4 VCU	59–48	CBSSN	2,012
6	12	1:30 pm	#3 UMass vs #7 Saint Joseph's	76–58	CBSSN	2,012
Championship – Sunday, March 6
7	13	2:00 pm	#1 Dayton vs #3 UMass	56–62	ESPN2	2,228

*Game times in Eastern Time.

== Bracket ==
First round Wednesday, March 2 ESPN+
12	George Washington	54
13	St. Bonaventure	49
11	Saint Louis	50
14	George Mason	65

Second round Thursday, March 3 ESPN+
8	Richmond	62
9	Davidson	66
5	La Salle	54
12	George Washington	64
7	Saint Joseph's	65
10	Duquesne	49
6	Fordham	66
14	George Mason	50

Quarterfinals; Friday, March 4 ESPN+
1	Dayton	60*
9	Davidson	55
4	VCU	55
12	George Washington	47
2	Rhode Island	48
7	Saint Joseph's	51
3	UMass	66
6	Fordham	63

Semifinals; Saturday, March 5 CBSSN
1	Dayton	59
4	VCU	48
7	Saint Joseph's	58
3	UMass	76

Championship; Sunday, March 6 ESPN2
1	Dayton	56
3	UMass	62
