= 2021–22 UMass Minutewomen basketball team =

American college basketball season

2021–22 UMass Minutewomen basketball

A10 Tournament Champions

NCAA tournament, first round
- Conference: Atlantic 10 Conference
- Record: 26–7 (11–4 A-10)
- Head coach: Tory Verdi (6th season)
- Assistant coaches: Mike LeFlar; Lynne-Ann Kokoski; Cassandra Callaway
- Home arena: Mullins Center

2021–22 Atlantic 10 women's basketball standings
	Conf.				Overall
Team	W		L	PCT	W		L	PCT
Dayton	14	–	1	.933	25	–	6	.806
Rhode Island	12	–	2	.857	22	–	7	.759
UMass †	11	–	4	.733	26	–	7	.788
VCU	9	–	5	.643	16	–	12	.571
La Salle	9	–	6	.600	16	–	12	.571
Fordham	8	–	6	.571	18	–	11	.621
Saint Joseph's	7	–	8	.467	13	–	17	.433
Richmond	7	–	9	.438	16	–	14	.533
Davidson	6	–	10	.375	18	–	15	.545
Duquesne	6	–	10	.375	11	–	18	.379
Saint Louis	5	–	9	.357	9	–	18	.333
George Washington	4	–	11	.267	13	–	18	.419
St. Bonaventure	4	–	12	.250	12	–	16	.429
George Mason	3	–	12	.200	10	–	19	.345
† 2022 A10 Tournament winner

The 2021–22 UMass Minutewomen basketball team represented the University of Massachusetts Amherst during the 2021–22 college basketball season. The Minutewomen, led by sixth-year head coach Tory Verdi, were members of the Atlantic 10 Conference and played their home games at the Mullins Center.

They finished the season 26–7 overall, and 11–4 in A-10 play to finish in third place. As the third seed in the A-10 Tournament, they received a bye into the Quarterfinals where they defeated Fordham. They defeated Saint Joseph's in the semifinals and first seed Dayton in the final to win the tournament. As a result, the Minutewomen received the conference's automatic bid to the NCAA tournament, where they were the twelfth seed in the Bridgeport Region. They lost in the first round to Notre Dame to end their season.

== Previous season ==
The Minutewomen finished the season 16–8 overall, and 7–5 in A-10 play to finish in seventh place. As the seventh seed in the A-10 Tournament, they received a bye into the second round, where they defeated Saint Joseph's in overtime. They lost to Fordham in the quarterfinals. They received an at-large bid to the WNIT. In the Charlotte regional, they lost in the first round to Villanova, but won both consolation games versus Charlotte and Ohio.

== Roster ==
2021–22 UMass Minutewomen women's basketball team
Players
Coaches

Pos.	#	Name	Height	Year	Previous school	Hometown
G	1	Sydney Taylor	5 ft 9 in (1.75 m)	Jr	St. Anthony's	Huntington Station, NY
G	2	Alexzeya Brooks	5 ft 9 in (1.75 m)	Fr	Westtown School	Endicott, NY
G	3	Destiney Philoxy	5 ft 7 in (1.7 m)	Sr	South Shore	Queens, NY
F	5	Makennah White	6 ft 2 in (1.88 m)	So	West Middlesex	Farrell, PA
G	11	Damoni Tucker	5 ft 6 in (1.68 m)	Fr	South Shore	New York, NY
C	15	Natousha Harden	6 ft 4 in (1.93 m)	Fr	Springfield Commonwealth	New London, CT
F	21	Aisha Dabo	6 ft 1 in (1.85 m)	Fr	Forsyth Central	Cumming, GA
G	22	Shavonne Smith	5 ft 11 in (1.8 m)	Sr	Pemberton Township	Pemberton, NJ
G	23	Ber'nyah Mayo	5 ft 6 in (1.68 m)	So	St. Elizabeth	Wilmington, DE
F	30	Angelique Ngalakulondi	6 ft 2 in (1.88 m)	Jr	Proctor Academy	Manchester, NH
F	33	Michelle Pruitt	5 ft 11 in (1.8 m)	GS	Homewood-Flossmoor; UTEP	Chicago, IL
F	34	Sam Breen	6 ft 1 in (1.85 m)	GS	North Catholic; Penn State	Gibsonia, PA
G	44	Stefanie Kulesza	5 ft 11 in (1.8 m)	Fr	Conrad Schools of Science	Wilmington, DE

Head coach

- Tory Verdi (Keene State)

Assistant coach(es)

- Mike LeFlar (Boston College)
- Lynne-Ann Kokoski (Bryant)
- Cassandra Callaway (Albany)

Legend

- (C) Team captain
- (S) Suspended
- (I) Ineligible
- (W) Walk-on
- Injured
- Current redshirt

Roster
Last update: June 8, 2022

== Schedule ==
Date time, TV	Rank^{#}	Opponent^{#}	Result	Record	Site (attendance) city, state
Exhibition
November 1, 2021*; 7:00 p.m.		Saint Rose	W 95–54	–	Mullins Center; Amherst, MA
Non-conference regular season
November 9, 2021*; 5:00 p.m., NESN+		Central Connecticut State	W 87–50	1–0	Mullins Center (356); Amherst, MA
November 12, 2021*; 5:00 p.m., NESN		Harvard	W 80–71	2–0	Mullins Center (720); Amherst, MA
November 16, 2021*; 7:00 p.m., ESPN+		Iona	W 79–56	3–0	Mullins Center (612); Amherst, MA
November 19, 2021*; 6:00 p.m., ESPN+		at Holy Cross	W 61–58	4–0	Hart Center (673); Worcester, MA
November 23, 2021*; 4:00 p.m., FloHoops		at Providence	W 80–62	5–0	Alumni Hall (225); Providence, RI
November 26, 2021*; 11:00 a.m., FloHoops		vs. South Dakota State; Gulf Coast Showcase	W 81–63	6–0	Hertz Arena (143); Estero, FL
November 27, 2021*; 5:00 p.m., FloHoops		vs. Kent State; Gulf Coast Showcase	W 72–64	7–0	Hertz Arena (187); Estero, FL
November 28, 2021*; 7:30 p.m., FloHoops		vs. No. 13 Iowa State; Gulf Coast Showcase	L 71–76	7–1	Hertz Arena (200); Estero, FL
December 1, 2021*; 7:00 p.m., NESN		Fairfield	W 74–61	8–1	Mullins Center (407); Amherst, MA
December 5, 2021*; Noon, NESN		UMass Lowell	W 58–53	9–1	Mullins Center (537); Amherst, MA
December 8, 2021*; 7:00 p.m., NESN+		Boston College	L 60–66	9–2	Mullins Center (958); Amherst, MA
December 11, 2021*; 2:00 p.m., ESPN+		at Columbia	W 87–75	10–2	Levien Gymnasium (676); New York, NY
December 19, 2021*; 3:30 p.m., ESPN+		Vermont	W 68–63	11–2	Mullins Center (1,739); Amherst, MA
December 22, 2021*; Noon, ESPN+		at Hartford	W 86–40	12–2	Chase Arena (204); Hartford, CT
A-10 regular season
January 9, 2022; 2:00 p.m., NESN+		La Salle	Cancelled		Mullins Center; Amherst, MA
January 12, 2022; 6:00 p.m., ESPN+		at VCU	W 72–60	13–2 (1–0)	Siegel Center (323); Richmond, VA
January 15, 2022; 4:00 p.m., ESPN+		at Richmond	W 73–72 ^{OT}	14–2 (2–0)	Robins Center (450); Richmond, VA
January 17, 2022; 6:00 p.m., ESPN+		at Rhode Island	L 58–66	14–3 (2–1)	Ryan Center (498); Kingston, RI
January 19, 2022; 7:00 p.m., NESN+		Dayton	L 60–69	14–4 (2–2)	Mullins Center (632); Amherst, MA
January 22, 2022; 2:00 p.m., ESPN+		at George Washington	W 68–41	15–4 (3–2)	Smith Center; Washington, D.C.
January 26, 2022; 7:00 p.m., NESN+		Rhode Island	L 46–60	15–5 (3–3)	Mullins Center (1,374); Amherst, MA
January 29, 2022; 2:00 p.m., ESPN+		at Saint Joseph's	W 74–48	16–5 (4–3)	Hagan Arena (202); Philadelphia, PA
February 5, 2022; Noon, NESN		Saint Louis	W 69–66	17–5 (5–3)	Mullins Center (765); Amherst, MA
February 9, 2022; 7:00 p.m., ESPN+		at St. Bonaventure	W 78–59	18–5 (6–3)	Reilly Center (252); Olean, NY
February 11, 2022; Noon, NESN		George Mason	W 87–58	19–5 (7–3)	Mullins Center (550); Amherst, MA
February 13, 2022; Noon, CBSSN		Duquesne	W 89–59	20–5 (8–3)	Mullins Center (762); Amherst, MA
February 16, 2022; 7:00 p.m., NESN+		Fordham	W 60–57	21–5 (9–3)	Mullins Center (692); Amherst, MA
February 20, 2022; Noon, CBSSN		at Davidson	L 67–76	21–6 (9–4)	John M. Belk Arena (626); Davidson, NC
February 23, 2022; 7:00 p.m., ESPN+		VCU	W 66–57	22–6 (10–4)	Mullins Center (1,161); Amherst, MA
February 26, 2022; 8:00 p.m., ESPN+		at Saint Louis	W 74–62	23–6 (11–4)	Chaifetz Arena (1,102); St. Louis, MO
Atlantic 10 Tournament
March 4, 2022; 7:30 p.m., ESPN+	(3)	vs. (6) Fordham; Quarterfinals	W 66–63	24–6	Chase Fieldhouse (1,148); Wilmington, DE
March 5, 2022; 1:30 p.m., CBSSN	(3)	vs. (7) Saint Joseph's; Semifinals	W 76–58	25–6	Chase Fieldhouse (2,012); Wilmington, DE
March 6, 2022; 2:00 p.m., ESPN2	(3)	vs. (1) Dayton; Final	W 62–56	26–6	Chase Fieldhouse (2,228); Wilmington, DE
NCAA tournament
March 19, 2022; 7:30 p.m., ESPN2	(12 B)	vs. (5 B) No. 21 Notre Dame; First Round	L 78–89	26–7	Lloyd Noble Center; Norman, OK
*Non-conference game. ^{#}Rankings from AP Poll. (#) Tournament seedings in parentheses. B=Bridgeport. All times are in Eastern Time.

== Rankings ==
Ranking movements Legend: ██ Increase in ranking ██ Decrease in ranking — = Not ranked RV = Received votes
	Week																		
Poll	Pre	1	2	3	4	5	6	7	8	9	10	11	12	13	14	15	16	17	Final
AP	—	—	—	—	—	—	—	—	—	—	—	—	—	—	—	—	—	—	—
Coaches	—	—	—	—	—	—	—	RV	RV	RV	—	—	—	—	—	—	—	RV	—

Legend
	Increase in ranking
	Decrease in ranking
	Not ranked previous week
(RV)	Received votes
(NR)	Not ranked and did not receive votes

The Coaches Poll did not release a Week 2 poll, and the AP Poll did not release a poll after the NCAA Tournament.
