= 2019–20 Fordham Rams women's basketball team =

Intercollegiate basketball season

2019–20 Fordham Rams women's basketball
- Conference: Atlantic 10 Conference
- Record: 21–11 (11–5 A-10)
- Head coach: Stephanie Gaitley (9th season)
- Assistant coaches: Angelika Szumilo; Sonia Burke; Valerie Nainima
- Home arena: Rose Hill Gymnasium

2019–20 Atlantic 10 women's basketball standings
	Conf.				Overall
Team	W		L	PCT	W		L	PCT
Dayton†	15	–	1	.938	25	–	8	.758
VCU	13	–	3	.813	20	–	12	.625
Fordham	11	–	5	.688	21	–	10	.677
Duquesne	9	–	7	.563	20	–	11	.645
Massachusetts	9	–	7	.563	20	–	11	.645
Saint Louis	9	–	7	.563	19	–	13	.594
Davidson	8	–	8	.500	16	–	15	.516
George Washington	8	–	8	.500	14	–	16	.467
Richmond	7	–	9	.438	15	–	17	.469
La Salle	7	–	9	.438	13	–	17	.433
Rhode Island	6	–	10	.375	13	–	16	.448
St. Bonaventure	4	–	12	.250	7	–	23	.233
Saint Joseph's	3	–	13	.188	9	–	20	.310
George Mason	3	–	13	.188	9	–	21	.300
† 2020 A10 tournament winner Rankings from AP poll

The 2019–20 Fordham Rams women's basketball team represented Fordham University during the 2019–20 NCAA Division I women's basketball season. The Rams were led by ninth-year head coach Stephanie Gaitley. They were members of the Atlantic 10 Conference (A-10) and played their home games at the Rose Hill Gymnasium in the Bronx, New York. They finished the season 21–11, 11–5 in A-10 play. Fordham lost the Atlantic 10 Conference tournament championship game to VCU, 55–60.

== Schedule ==
Date time, TV	Rank^{#}	Opponent^{#}	Result	Record	Site (attendance) city, state	
Exhibition
October 31, 2019*; 7:00 p.m.		New York Tech	W 57–49		Rose Hill Gymnasium; The Bronx, NY	
Non-conference regular season
November 5, 2019*; 7:00 p.m., ESPN+		No. 14 Notre Dame	L 55–60	0–1	Rose Hill Gymnasium (3,200); The Bronx, NY	
November 10, 2019*; 2:00 p.m.		at Columbia	L 51–70	0–2	Levien Gymnasium (513); New York, NY	
November 13, 2019*; 7:00 p.m., ESPN+		at Penn State	L 59–72	0–3	Bryce Jordan Center (1,639); University Park, PA	
November 17, 2019*; 5:00 p.m., ESPN+		Villanova	L 66–73	0–4	Rose Hill Gymnasium (1,124); The Bronx, NY	
November 20, 2019*; 7:00 p.m.		vs. Northwestern	W 74–58	1–4	Rose Hill Gymnasium (857); The Bronx, NY	
November 24, 2019*; 1:00 p.m.		vs. Charlotte	W 76–51	2–4	Halton Arena (888); Charlotte, NC	
November 29, 2019*; 4:00 p.m.		vs. No. 24 Arkansas; Bahamas Hoopfest	L 59–71	2–5	Baha Mar Center; Nassau, Bahamas	
November 30, 2019*; 4:00 p.m.		vs. Lehigh; Bahamas Hoopfest	W 59–57	3–5	Baha Mar Center (80); Nassau, Bahamas	
December 5, 2019*; 7:00 p.m., ESPN+		at Manhattan; Battle of the Bronx	W 51–45	4–5	Draddy Gymnasium (571); Manhattan, NY	
December 8, 2019*; 2:00 p.m.		Georgetown	W 67–54	5–5	Rose Hill Gymnasium (985); The Bronx, NY	
December 14, 2019*; 2:00 p.m., ESPN+		Southern	W 65–52	6–5	Rose Hill Gymnasium (729); The Bronx, NY	
December 29, 2019*; 1:00 p.m.		Samford; Fordham Holiday Classic semifinals	W 68–37	7–5	Rose Hill Gymnasium (1,112); The Bronx, NY	
December 30, 2019*; 3:00 p.m., ESPN+		Houston; Fordham Holiday Classic championship	W 63–54	8–5	Rose Hill Gymnasium; The Bronx, NY	
Atlantic 10 regular season
January 4, 2020; 2:00 p.m., ESPN+		St. Bonaventure	W 79–53	9–5 (1–0)	Rose Hill Gymnasium (811); The Bronx, NY	
January 8, 2020; 11:00 a.m., ESPN+		at Davidson	L 62–74	9–5 (1–1)	John M. Belk Arena (1,496); Davidson, NC	
January 12, 2020; 2:00 p.m., CBSSN		George Washington	W 53–47	10–5 (2–1)	Rose Hill Gymnasium (906); The Bronx, NY	
January 19, 2020; 4:00 p.m., ESPN+		at George Mason	W 66–54	11–5 (3–1)	EagleBank Arena (975); Fairfax, VA	
January 23, 2020; 7:00 p.m., CBSSN		Saint Louis	W 66–54	12–6 (4–1)	Rose Hill Gymnasium (1,026); The Bronx, NY	
January 26, 2020; 12:00 p.m., ESPNU		at Dayton	L 44–48	12–7 (4–2)	UD Arena (1,295); Dayton, OH	
January 29, 2020; 6:00 p.m., ESPN+		at VCU	L 52–62	12–8 (4–3)	Stuart C. Siegel Center (374); Richmond, VA	
February 1, 2020; 2:00 p.m., ESPN+		La Salle	W 62–45	13–8 (5–3)	Rose Hill Gymnasium (961); The Bronx, NY	
February 5, 2020; 11:00am, ESPN+		Rhode Island	W 60–50	14–8 (6–3)	Rose Hill Gymnasium (3,200); The Bronx, NY	
February 8, 2020; 1:00 p.m., ESPN+		Massachusetts	W 69–64	15–8 (7–3)	Mullins Center (1,456); Amherst, MA	
February 13, 2020; 7:00 p.m., ESPN+		Davidson	W 47–46	16–8 (8–3)	Rose Hill Gymnasium (418); The Bronx, NY	
February 16, 2019; 1:00 p.m., ESPN+		at Richmond	W 64–47	17–8 (9–3)	Robins Center (782); Richmond, VA	
February 19, 2020; 12:00 p.m., ESPN+		at St. Louis	L 49–59	17–9 (9–4)	Chaifetz Arena (9,873); St. Louis, MO	
February 22, 2020; 1:00 p.m., ESPN+		Dayton	W 50–38	18–9 (10–4)	Rose Hill Gymnasium; The Bronx, NY	
February 25, 2020; 7:00 p.m., ESPN+		at Duquesne	L 63–74	18–10 (10–4)	La Roche (451); Pittsburgh, PA	
February 29, 2020; 2:00 p.m., ESPN+		Saint Joseph's	W 67–45	19–10 (11–4)	Rose Hill Gymnasium; The Bronx, NY	
Atlantic 10 women's tournament
March 3, 2020; 7:00 p.m., ESPN+	(3)	(14) St. Joseph’s; Quarterfinals	W 59–36	20–10	Rose Hill Gymnasium (895); The Bronx, NY	
March 6, 2020; 7:00 p.m., CBSSN	(3)	vs. (6) Duquesne; Semifinals	W 54–47	21–10	UD Arena (2,955); Dayton, OH	
March 7, 2020; 1:30 p.m., CBSSN	(3)	vs. (2) VCU; Championship game	L 55–60	21–11	UD Arena (1,458); Dayton, OH	
AP						N/A
Coaches						

== See also ==
- 2019–20 Fordham Rams men's basketball team
