= VCU Rams basketball =

VCU Rams basketball may refer to either of the basketball teams that represent Virginia Commonwealth University:

- VCU Rams men's basketball
- VCU Rams women's basketball
