= 2020–21 Richmond Spiders women's basketball team =

Intercollegiate basketball season

2020–21 Richmond Spiders women's basketball
- Conference: Atlantic 10 Conference
- Record: 13–9 (9–6 A-10)
- Head coach: Aaron Roussell (2nd season)
- Assistant coaches: Jeanine Radice; Darren Guensch; Brittany Pinkney
- Home arena: Robins Center

2020–21 Atlantic 10 women's basketball standings
	Conf.				Overall
Team	W		L	PCT	W		L	PCT
Dayton	12	–	1	.923	14	–	5	.737
Fordham	8	–	2	.800	12	–	6	.667
Rhode Island	11	–	4	.733	11	–	8	.579
Saint Louis	9	–	3	.750	14	–	6	.700
VCU †	10	–	5	.667	16	–	11	.593
Richmond	9	–	6	.600	13	–	9	.591
UMass	7	–	5	.583	16	–	8	.667
Duquesne	4	–	7	.364	5	–	11	.313
Saint Joseph's	5	–	9	.357	7	–	10	.412
George Washington	5	–	9	.357	9	–	14	.391
La Salle	6	–	11	.353	11	–	15	.423
St. Bonaventure	6	–	11	.353	8	–	13	.381
Davidson	5	–	10	.333	8	–	15	.348
George Mason	0	–	14	.000	3	–	19	.136
† 2021 A10 Tournament winner As of July 7, 2024; Rankings from AP poll

The 2020–21 Richmond Spiders women's basketball team represented the University of Richmond during the 2020–21 NCAA Division I women's basketball season. The Spiders, led by second-year head coach Aaron Roussell, played their home games at the Robins Center and were members of the Atlantic 10 Conference.

== Previous season ==
The Spiders finished the 2019–20 season with a record of 15–17, 7–9 in A-10 play to finish in a tie for ninth place. They earned the ninth seed in the A-10 women's tournament by virtue of a head-to-head tiebreaker over La Salle and defeated No. 8 seed George Washington on the road in the first round. The Spiders then fell to No. 1 seed Dayton in the second round.

== Roster ==
2020–21 Richmond Spiders women's basketball team
Players
Coaches

Pos.	#	Name	Height	Year	Previous school	Hometown
G	1	Grace Townsend	5 ft 5 in (1.65 m)	Fr	James River	Midlothian, VA
G	2	Aniyah Carpenter	5 ft 8 in (1.73 m)	Jr	Roland Park Country	Baltimore, MD
G	3	Celia Satter	6 ft 0 in (1.83 m)	So	Loyola Academy	Glencoe, IL
F	10	Madelyn Neff	6 ft 1 in (1.85 m)	Jr	Hayward	Hayward, WI
G	12	Claire Holt	5 ft 8 in (1.73 m)	Jr	Spain Park	Hoover, AL
G	13	Alex Parson	5 ft 6 in (1.68 m)	Sr	Monacan	North Chesterfield, VA
F	15	Emma Squires	6 ft 2 in (1.88 m)	Jr	Tabor Academy	Kingston, MA
F	20	Addie Budnik	6 ft 2 in (1.88 m)	Fr	Highland Park	Highland Park, IL
G	21	Kylee Lewandowski	6 ft 1 in (1.85 m)	Fr	North Catholic	Pittsburgh, PA
G	22	Molly Mraz	5 ft 8 in (1.73 m)	Jr	Villa Maria	Erie, PA
G	24	Kate Klimkiewicz	6 ft 0 in (1.83 m)	Jr	Paul VI; Boston College	Oakton, VA
F	30	Kailyn Fee	5 ft 6 in (1.68 m)	Sr	Oakton	Vienna, VA
F	31	Elaina Chapman	6 ft 3 in (1.91 m)	So	Trinity Episcopal	Richmond, VA
G	32	Siobhan Ryan	6 ft 0 in (1.83 m)	Fr	Sacred Heart	Buffalo, NY
F	33	Maya Ettle	6 ft 4 in (1.93 m)	Fr	Moravian	Bethlehem, PA
G	41	Angel Burgos	5 ft 8 in (1.73 m)	So	Trinity Episcopal	Richmond, VA

Head coach

- Aaron Roussell (Iowa)

Assistant coach(es)

- Jeanine Radice (Fordham)
- Darren Guensch (Radford)
- Brittany Pinkney (VCU)

Legend

- (C) Team captain
- (S) Suspended
- (I) Ineligible
- (W) Walk-on
- Injured
- Current redshirt

Roster
Last update: December 6, 2020

== Schedule ==
Richmond's 2020–21 non-conference schedule was planned to include 8 games, although adjustments due to the COVID-19 pandemic resulted in the cancelation of three games.

In the Atlantic 10 portion of the schedule, Richmond was scheduled to play a total of 18 games, including home and away games against VCU, George Washington, Rhode Island, Massachusetts, and George Mason. In addition, Richmond was scheduled to host Fordham, Davidson, St. Joseph's and La Salle and travel to St. Bonaventure, Duquesne, Dayton, and Saint Louis. The Fordham and Davidson games, as well as the home Massachusetts game, were postponed and ultimately canceled due to impacts of the COVID-19 pandemic.

Date time, TV	Rank^{#}	Opponent^{#}	Result	Record	High points	High rebounds	High assists	Site (attendance) city, state
Non-conference regular season
Nov 25, 2020*; 4:00 p.m., ACCNX		at Virginia Tech	L 64–85	0–1	14 – Klimkiewicz	6 – Townsend	3 – Tied	Cassell Coliseum (250); Blacksburg, VA
Nov 29, 2020*; 2:00 p.m., ESPN+		Georgetown	Canceled due to COVID-19					Robins Center; Richmond, VA
Dec 2, 2020*; 5:00 p.m., ESPN+		Navy	W 65–49	1–1	14 – Holt	14 – Chapman	3 – Tied	Robins Center; Richmond, VA
Dec 4, 2020*; 5:00 p.m., ESPN+		Gardner–Webb	W 85–73	2–1	25 – Klimkiewicz	9 – Klimkiewicz	6 – Townsend	Robins Center; Richmond, VA
Dec 6, 2020*; 2:00 p.m., FloSports		at William & Mary	W 72–55	3–1	23 – Budnik	11 – Chapman	5 – Townsend	Kaplan Arena; Williamsburg, VA
Dec 13, 2020*; 2:00 p.m., ESPN+		Saint Francis (PA)	Canceled due to COVID-19					Robins Center; Richmond, VA
Dec 17, 2020*; 2:00 p.m.		at Norfolk State	Canceled due to COVID-19					Joseph G. Echols Memorial Hall; Norfolk, VA
Atlantic 10 regular season
Dec 20, 2020; 2:00 p.m., ESPN+		VCU; Crosstown Showdown	L 49–73	3–2 (0–1)	19 – Klimkiewicz	7 – Chapman	4 – Parson	Robins Center; Richmond, VA
Non-conference regular season
Dec 22, 2020*; 2:00 p.m.		at Howard	L 54–65	3–3	13 – Tied	12 – Ryan	4 – Ryan	Burr Gymnasium; Washington, D.C.
Atlantic 10 regular season
Jan 8, 2021; 6:00 p.m., ESPN+		at St. Bonaventure	W 59–58	4–3 (1–1)	18 – Klimkiewicz	9 – Klimkiewicz	4 – Townsend	Reilly Center; St. Bonaventure, NY
Jan 10, 2021; 2:00 p.m., ESPN+		at Duquesne	W 80–78	5–3 (2–1)	18 – Budnik	7 – Townsend	7 – Townsend	Kerr Fitness Center; McCandless, PA
Jan 13, 2021; 5:00 p.m., ESPN+		George Washington	W 47–42	6–3 (3–1)	14 – Klimkiewicz	14 – Klimkiewicz	5 – Townsend	Robins Center; Richmond, VA
Jan 15, 2021; 5:00 p.m., ESPN+		Rhode Island	L 53–56	6–4 (3–2)	17 – Klimkiewicz	7 – Klimkiewicz	4 – Tied	Robins Center; Richmond, VA
Jan 17, 2021; 2:00 p.m., CBSSN		UMass	Canceled due to COVID-19					Robins Center; Richmond, VA
Jan 24, 2021; 1:00 p.m., ESPN+		at VCU; Crosstown Showdown	W 69–64	7–4 (4–2)	14 – Tied	8 – Klimkiewicz	4 – Budnik	Siegel Center (123); Richmond, VA
Jan 26, 2021; 5:00 p.m., ESPN+		George Mason	W 86–48	8–4 (5–2)	18 – Chapman	8 – Chapman	4 – Townsend	Robins Center; Richmond, VA
Jan 29, 2021; 5:00 p.m., ESPN+		at George Washington	W 60–49	9–4 (7–2)	13 – Budnik	11 – Chapman	3 – Townsend	Charles E. Smith Center; Washington, D.C.
Jan 31, 2021; 2:00 p.m., ESPN+		at George Mason	W 67–52	10–4 (7–2)	16 – Budnik	9 – Chapman	7 – Townsend	EagleBank Arena (114); Fairfax, VA
Feb 5, 2021; 5:00 p.m., ESPN+		Fordham	Canceled due to COVID-19					Robins Center; Richmond, VA
Feb 7, 2021; 2:00 p.m., ESPN+		Davidson	Canceled due to COVID-19					Robins Center; Richmond, VA
Feb 12, 2021; 5:00 p.m., ESPN+		at Dayton	L 54–72	10–5 (7–3)	13 – Budnik	7 – Budnik	3 – Tied	UD Arena; Dayton, OH
Feb 14, 2021; 2:00 p.m., ESPN+		at Saint Louis	L 57–62	10–6 (7–4)	21 – Budnik	9 – Budnik	4 – Tied	Chaifetz Arena; St. Louis, MO
Feb 19, 2021; 1:00 p.m., ESPN+		Saint Joseph's	W 68–58	11–6 (8–4)	23 – Klimkiewicz	13 – Klimkiewicz	4 – Budnik	Robins Center; Richmond, VA
Feb 20, 2021 noon, ESPN+		La Salle	W 67–61	12–6 (9–4)	14 – Klimkiewicz	10 – Chapman	5 – Parson	Robins Center; Richmond, VA
Feb 26, 2021; 4:00 p.m., ESPN+		at Rhode Island	L 56–70	12–7 (9–5)	16 – Klimkiewicz	6 – Tied	4 – Budnik	Ryan Center; Kingston, RI
Feb 28, 2021; 4:30 p.m., ESPN+		vs. UMass	L 65–70	12–8 (9–6)	23 – Klimkiewicz	10 – Chapman	4 – Klimkiewicz	Ryan Center; Kingston, RI
Atlantic 10 Tournament
Mar 11, 2021; 8:00 p.m., ESPN+	(6)	vs. (11) George Washington; Second round	W 58–54 ^{OT}	13–8	15 – Klimkiewicz	11 – Klimkiewicz	5 – Parson	Siegel Center; Richmond, VA
Mar 12, 2021; 8:00 p.m., ESPN+	(6)	vs. (3) Saint Louis; Quarterfinal	L 58–59 ^{OT}	13–9	19 – Klimkiewicz	7 – Klimkiewicz	3 – Parson	Siegel Center (250); Richmond, VA
*Non-conference game. ^{#}Rankings from AP Poll. (#) Tournament seedings in parentheses. All times are in Eastern Time.
