= 2021–22 Dayton Flyers women's basketball team =

Intercollegiate basketball season

2021–22 Dayton Flyers women's basketball

Atlantic 10 regular season champions

NCAA tournament, first round
- Conference: Atlantic 10 Conference
- Record: 26–6 (14–1 A-10)
- Head coach: Shauna Green (3rd season)
- Assistant coaches: Simon Harris; Calamity McEntire; Ryan Gensler
- Home arena: UD Arena

2021–22 Atlantic 10 women's basketball standings
	Conf.				Overall
Team	W		L	PCT	W		L	PCT
Dayton	14	–	1	.933	25	–	6	.806
Rhode Island	12	–	2	.857	22	–	7	.759
UMass †	11	–	4	.733	26	–	7	.788
VCU	9	–	5	.643	16	–	12	.571
La Salle	9	–	6	.600	16	–	12	.571
Fordham	8	–	6	.571	18	–	11	.621
Saint Joseph's	7	–	8	.467	13	–	17	.433
Richmond	7	–	9	.438	16	–	14	.533
Davidson	6	–	10	.375	18	–	15	.545
Duquesne	6	–	10	.375	11	–	18	.379
Saint Louis	5	–	9	.357	9	–	18	.333
George Washington	4	–	11	.267	13	–	18	.419
St. Bonaventure	4	–	12	.250	12	–	16	.429
George Mason	3	–	12	.200	10	–	19	.345
† 2022 A10 Tournament winner

The 2021–22 Dayton Flyers women's basketball team represented the University of Dayton during the 2021–22 NCAA Division I women's basketball season. The Flyers, led by third-year head coach Shauna Green, played their home games at UD Arena and are members of the Atlantic 10 Conference. They finished the season 25–5, 14–1 to win the regular season championship. They advanced to the finals of the A-10 women's tournament where they lost to UMass. They received an at-large bid to the 2022 NCAA Division I women's basketball tournament.

== Media ==
=== Dayton Flyers Sports Network ===
The Dayton Flyers Sports Network will broadcast Flyers games off of their athletic website, DaytonFlyers.com, with Shane White on the call. Most home games will also be featured on the A-10 Digital Network. Select games will be televised.

== Roster ==
2021–22 Dayton Flyers women's basketball team
Players
Coaches

Pos.	#	Name	Height	Year	Previous school	Hometown
G	1	Araion Bradshaw	5 ft 6 in (1.68 m)	GS	Tabor Academy; South Carolina	Hyde Park, MA
G	3	Makira Cook	5 ft 6 in (1.68 m)	So	Mount Notre Dame	Cincinnati, OH
G	4	Capria Brown	5 ft 9 in (1.75 m)	So	Schlarman	Danville, IL
F	5	Kyla Whitehead	6 ft 2 in (1.88 m)	Sr	Pickerington Central	Pickerington, OH
F	10	Anna Lemaster	6 ft 2 in (1.88 m)	RS Fr	Stone Bridge	Ashburn, VA
F	11	Amari Davidson	6 ft 2 in (1.88 m)	Sr	Avon	Avon, OH
G	12	Jenna Giacone	6 ft 1 in (1.85 m)	GS	Bethlehem Central	Delmar, NY
F	13	Shannon Wheeler	6 ft 0 in (1.83 m)	Fr	Renaissance	Detroit, MI
G/F	21	Erin Whalen (redshirt)	6 ft 1 in (1.85 m)	Jr	Providence Day School; Vanderbilt	Charlotte, NC
F	23	Mariah Perez	6 ft 3 in (1.91 m)	Jr	Newark Tech	Newark, NJ
G/F	24	Maliya Perry	6 ft 0 in (1.83 m)	RS Jr	Pickerington Central	Columbus, OH
F	32	Brynn Shoup-Hill	6 ft 3 in (1.91 m)	Fr	Goshen	Goshen, IN
G	33	Destiny Bohanon	5 ft 10 in (1.78 m)	RS So	Wayne	Huber Heights, OH
C	34	Tenin Magassa	6 ft 5 in (1.96 m)	So	Jean Moulin	Morsang-sur-Orge, France

Head coach

- Shauna Green (Canisius)

Assistant coach(es)

- Ryan Gensler (Saint Joseph's)
- Deantoine Beasley (Tennessee Tech)
- Olivia Applewhite (Dayton)

Legend

- (C) Team captain
- (S) Suspended
- (I) Ineligible
- (W) Walk-on
- Injured
- Current redshirt

Roster
Last update: March 16, 2022

== Schedule ==
Date time, TV	Rank^{#}	Opponent^{#}	Result	Record	Site (attendance) city, state
Exhibition
Nov 5, 2021*; 7:00 pm		IUP	W 83–46		UD Arena; Dayton, OH
Non-conference regular season
Nov 9, 2021*; 11:00 am		Alabama A&M	W 73–52	1–0	UD Arena (1,155); Dayton, OH
Nov 12, 2021*; 7:00 pm, ESPN+		Duke	L 56–70	1–1	UD Arena (2,570); Dayton, OH
Nov 17, 2021*; 11:00 am		Toledo	W 69–60	2–1	UD Arena (1,057); Dayton, OH
Nov 20, 2021*; 6:00 pm, BTN+		at Purdue	W 78–62	3–1	Mackey Arena (1,938); West Lafayette, IN
Nov 25, 2021*; 12:00 pm, FloSports		vs. Mississippi State; Daytona Beach Invitational	L 54–65	3–2	Ocean Center; Daytona Beach, FL
Nov 26, 2021*; 2:15 pm, FloHoops		vs. Illinois; Daytona Beach Invitational	W 67–53	4–2	Ocean Center; Daytona Beach, FL
Nov 30, 2021*; 7:00 pm		Florida A&M	W 64–44	5–2	UD Arena (1,370); Dayton, OH
Dec 5, 2021*; 2:00 pm, ESPN+		at Illinois State	W 78–67	6–2	Redbird Arena (568); Normal, IL
Dec 8, 2021*; 2:00 pm, SECN+		at Florida	L 57–60	6–3	O'Connell Center (691); Gainesville, FL
Dec 20, 2021*; 3:30 pm, FloHoops		vs. High Point; West Palm Beach Tournament	W 71–64	7–3	Student Life Center; West Palm Beach, FL
Dec 21, 2021*; 3:30 pm, FloHoops		vs. Clemson; West Palm Beach Tournament	W 60–46	8–3	Student Life Center; West Palm Beach, FL
Dec 31, 2021*; 12:00 pm		Wright State	W 75–65	9–3	UD Arena (1,449); Dayton, OH
Atlantic 10 regular season
Jan 4, 2022; 7:00 pm		St. Bonaventure	W 90–43	10–3 (1–0)	UD Arena (1,062); Dayton, OH
Jan 8, 2022; 2:00 pm		George Washington	Postponed		UD Arena; Dayton, OH
Jan 12, 2022; 6:00 pm		at La Salle	W 65–57	11–3 (2–0)	Tom Gola Arena (303); Philadelphia, PA
Jan 16, 2022; 12:00 pm, CBSSN		Saint Louis	W 77–59	12–3 (3–0)	UD Arena (1,753); Dayton, OH
Jan 19, 2022; 7:00 pm, NESN+		at UMass	W 69–60	13–3 (4–0)	Mullins Center (632); Amherst, MA
Jan 23, 2022; 12:00 pm, ESPNU		Fordham	W 52–48	14–3 (5–0)	UD Arena (1,787); Dayton, OH
Jan 26, 2022; 6:00 pm, ESPN+		at Richmond	W 80–57	15–3 (6–0)	Robins Center (505); Richmond, VA
Jan 30, 2022; 1:00 pm		at Davidson	W 70–60	16–3 (7–0)	John M. Belk Arena (762); Davidson, NC
Feb 2, 2022; 7:00 pm		Duquesne	W 60–54	17–3 (8–0)	UD Arena (1,352); Dayton, OH
Feb 5, 2022; 2:00 pm		George Mason	W 84–44	18–3 (9–0)	UD Arena (1,559); Dayton, OH
Feb 9, 2022; 12:00 pm		at Saint Louis	W 69–54	19–3 (10–0)	Chaifetz Arena (372); St. Louis, MO
Feb 13, 2022; 12:00 pm, ESPNU		VCU	L 58–60	19–4 (10–1)	UD Arena (1,562); Dayton, OH
Feb 16, 2022; 6:00 pm		at Rhode Island	W 47–37	20–4 (11–1)	Ryan Center (2,415); Kingston, RI
Feb 19, 2022; 2:00 pm		at Fordham	W 48–47	21–4 (12–1)	Rose Hill Gymnasium (678); Bronx, NY
Feb 23, 2022; 7:00 pm		at Saint Joseph's	W 59–43	22–4 (13–1)	Hagan Arena (279); Philadelphia, PA
Feb 26, 2022; 2:00 pm		Rhode Island	W 60–46	23–4 (14–1)	UD Arena (3,716); Dayton, OH
Atlantic 10 Tournament
Mar 4, 2022; 11:00 am, ESPN+	(1)	vs. (9) Davidson; Quarterfinals	W 60–55 ^{OT}	24–4	Chase Fieldhouse (850); Wilmington, DE
Mar 5, 2022; 11:00 am, CBSSN	(1)	vs. (4) VCU; Semifinals	W 59–48	25–4	Chase Fieldhouse (2,012); Wilmington, DE
Mar 6, 2022; 11:00 am, ESPN2	(1)	vs. (3) UMass; Final	L 56–62	25–5	Chase Fieldhouse (2,228); Wilmington, DE
NCAA tournament
Mar 16, 2022; 9:00 pm, ESPNU	(11)	vs. (11) DePaul; First Four	W 88–57	26–5	Hilton Coliseum (436); Ames, IA
Mar 18, 2022; 7:30 pm, ESPNNews	(11 G)	vs. (6 G) Georgia; First Round	L 54–70	26–6	Hilton Coliseum; Ames, IA
*Non-conference game. ^{#}Rankings from AP Poll. (#) Tournament seedings in parentheses. All times are in Eastern Time.

== Rankings ==
2021–22 NCAA Division I women's basketball rankings

+ Regular season polls	Poll	Pre- Season	Week 2	Week 3	Week 4	Week 5	Week 6	Week 7	Week 8	Week 9	Week 10	Week 11	Week 12	Week 13	Week 14	Week 15	Week 16	Week 17	Week 18	Week 19	Final
AP																				N/A	
Coaches																					

Legend
	Increase in ranking
	Decrease in ranking
	No change
(RV)	Received votes
(NR)	Not ranked

== See also ==
- 2021–22 Dayton Flyers men's basketball team
