= Tory Verdi =

American basketball coach

Biographical details
- Education: Keene State College (BA); Hartford (MS)

Coaching career (HC unless noted)
- 2004–2005: Columbia
- 2005–2010: Nebraska (assistant)
- 2010–2012: Kansas (assistant)
- 2012–2016: Eastern Michigan
- 2016–2023: UMass
- 2023–2026: Pittsburgh

Head coaching record
- Overall: 231–219 (.513)

Tory Verdi is an American women's basketball coach, having last coached with the Pittsburgh Panthers women's basketball team of the Atlantic Coast Conference (ACC) in the 2025-2026 season. He spent three years as the head coach at Pittsburgh, having been named to the position on April 6, 2023. He was fired on March 3, 2026 after amassing a 29-66 overall record across three seasons.

His termination came several weeks after six former players on the Pittsburgh women's basketball team filed a Title IX lawsuit against Verdi and Pittsburgh over allegations of abusive coaching methods and a failure to investigate the reports of abuse. The lawsuits allege abusive coaching methods, Title IX violations and a failure by the school to act after abuses were reported to university administrators, including then athletic director Heather Lyke.

== Head coaching record ==
Record table
Season	Team	Overall	Conference	Standing	Postseason
Columbia Lions (Ivy League) (2004–2005)
2004–05	Columbia	3–7	3–7	6th	
Columbia:		3–7 (.300)	3–7 (.300)		
Eastern Michigan Eagles (Mid-American Conference) (2012–2016)
2012–13	Eastern Michigan	8–22	6–11	9th	
2013–14	Eastern Michigan	18–14	7–12	8th	WBI Second Round
2014–15	Eastern Michigan	24–13	11–7	T- 2nd West	WNIT Third Round
2015–16	Eastern Michigan	22–12	10–8	4th West	WNIT Second Round
Eastern Michigan:		72–61 (.541)	34–38 (.472)		
Massachusetts Minutewomen (Atlantic 10 Conference) (2017–2023)
2016–17	UMass	9–21	3–13	13th	
2017–18	UMass	14–16	6–10	10th	
2018–19	UMass	16–16	7–9	10th	
2019–20	UMass	20–11	9–7	T-4th	
2020–21	UMass	16–8	7–5	7th	WNIT First Round
2021–22	UMass	26–7	11–4	3rd	NCAA First Round
2022–23	UMass	26–6	14–2	T–1st	WNIT Second Round
Massachusetts:		127–85 (.599)	57–50 (.533)		
Pittsburgh Panthers (Atlantic Coast Conference) (2023–2026)
2023–24	Pittsburgh	8–24	2–16	T–14th	
2024–25	Pittsburgh	13–19	5–13	15th	
2025–26	Pittsburgh	8–23	1–17	T–17th	
Pittsburgh:		29–66 (.305)	8–46 (.148)		
Total:		231–219 (.513)			
National champion Postseason invitational champion Conference regular season champion Conference regular season and conference tournament champion Division regular season champion Division regular season and conference tournament champion Conference tournament champion

== Personal ==
Verdi is from New Britain, Connecticut and graduated from Keene State College in New Hampshire in 1996 with a degree in elementary education. He earned a master's degree in computer technology from the University of Hartford.
