= 2019–20 Richmond Spiders women's basketball team =

Intercollegiate basketball season

2019–20 Richmond Spiders women's basketball
- Conference: Atlantic 10 Conference
- Record: 15–17 (7–9 A-10)
- Head coach: Aaron Roussell (1st season)
- Assistant coaches: Jeanine Radice; Darren Guensch; Brittany Pinkney
- Home arena: Robins Center

2019–20 Atlantic 10 women's basketball standings
	Conf.				Overall
Team	W		L	PCT	W		L	PCT
Dayton†	15	–	1	.938	25	–	8	.758
VCU	13	–	3	.813	20	–	12	.625
Fordham	11	–	5	.688	21	–	10	.677
Duquesne	9	–	7	.563	20	–	11	.645
Massachusetts	9	–	7	.563	20	–	11	.645
Saint Louis	9	–	7	.563	19	–	13	.594
Davidson	8	–	8	.500	16	–	15	.516
George Washington	8	–	8	.500	14	–	16	.467
Richmond	7	–	9	.438	15	–	17	.469
La Salle	7	–	9	.438	13	–	17	.433
Rhode Island	6	–	10	.375	13	–	16	.448
St. Bonaventure	4	–	12	.250	7	–	23	.233
Saint Joseph's	3	–	13	.188	9	–	20	.310
George Mason	3	–	13	.188	9	–	21	.300
† 2020 A10 tournament winner Rankings from AP poll

The 2019–20 Richmond Spiders women's basketball team represented the University of Richmond during the 2019–20 NCAA Division I women's basketball season. The Spiders, led by first-year head coach Aaron Roussell, played their home games at the Robins Center in Richmond, Virginia and were members of the Atlantic 10 Conference (A-10). They finished their season with a record of 15–17, 7–9 in A-10 play, to finish in a tie with La Salle for ninth place.

The Spiders earned the ninth seed in the A-10 women's tournament by virtue of a head-to-head tiebreaker over La Salle and defeated No. 8 seed George Washington on the road in the first round. The Spiders then fell to No. 1 seed Dayton in the second round.

Roussell was announced as Richmond's head coach on April 2, 2019, after having spent seven seasons as head coach at Bucknell University. Roussell succeeded Michael Shafer, who had spent 14 years as the head coach of the Spiders.

== Previous season ==
The Spiders finished the 2018–19 season with a record of 9–21, 6–10 in A-10 play, to finish in eleventh place. They lost in the first round of the A-10 women's tournament to No. 6 seed Saint Louis.

== Roster ==
2019–20 Richmond Spiders women's basketball team
Players
Coaches

Pos.	#	Name	Height	Year	Previous school	Hometown
F	1	Jaide Hinds-Clarke	6 ft 1 in (1.85 m)	Sr	Westwood	Westwood, NJ
G	2	Aniyah Carpenter	5 ft 8 in (1.73 m)	So	Roland Park Country	Baltimore, MD
G	3	Celia Sater	6 ft 0 in (1.83 m)	Fr	Loyola Academy	Glencoe, IL
F	5	Ragan Wiseman	6 ft 1 in (1.85 m)	Sr	Floyd County	Floyd, VA
F	10	Madelyn Neff	6 ft 1 in (1.85 m)	So	Hayward	Hayward, WI
F	11	Kaila Clark	5 ft 11 in (1.8 m)	RS Jr	Archbishop Spalding; Navy	Hughesville, MD
G	12	Claire Holt	5 ft 6 in (1.68 m)	So	Spain Park	Hoover, AL
G	13	Alex Parson	5 ft 6 in (1.68 m)	Jr	Monacan	Chesterfield County, VA
F	15	Emma Squires	6 ft 2 in (1.88 m)	So	Tabor Academy	Marion, MA
F	21	Imani Mustaf	6 ft 5 in (1.96 m)	So	Maret School	Washington, D.C.
G	22	Molly Mraz	5 ft 8 in (1.73 m)	So	Villa Maria Academy	Erie, PA
G	24	Kate Klimkiewicz	6 ft 0 in (1.83 m)	So	Paul VI; Boston College	Oakton, VA
G	25	Jayana Ervin	5 ft 8 in (1.73 m)	Sr	Bellarmine Prep; Harcum College	Tacoma, WA
F	30	Kailyn Fee	5 ft 6 in (1.68 m)	Jr	Oakton	Vienna, VA
F	31	Elaina Chapman	6 ft 3 in (1.91 m)	Fr	Trinity Episcopal	Richmond, VA
F	33	Amy Duggan	6 ft 0 in (1.83 m)	Sr	Noble and Greenough	Norwood, MA
G	41	Angel Burgos	5 ft 8 in (1.73 m)	Fr	Trinity Episcopal	Richmond, VA

Head coach

- Aaron Roussell (Iowa)

Assistant coach(es)

- Jeanine Radice (Fordham)
- Darren Guensch (Radford)
- Brittany Pinkney (VCU)

Legend

- (C) Team captain
- (S) Suspended
- (I) Ineligible
- (W) Walk-on
- Injured
- Current redshirt

Roster
Last update: June 3, 2024

== Schedule ==
Richmond's 2019–20 non-conference schedule consisted of 14 games, including two tournaments: two games in the Coastal Carolina Thanksgiving Tournament in Conway, South Carolina, and three games in the Anne Donovan Classic in Norfolk, Virginia.

In the Atlantic 10 portion of the schedule, Richmond played a total of 16 games, including home-and-away games against VCU, La Salle and St. Bonaventure. In addition, Richmond hosted Davidson, Dayton, Duquesne, Fordham and Saint Louis, while the Spiders traveled to George Mason, George Washington, Massachusetts, Rhode Island and Saint Joseph's.

The first round of the 2020 Atlantic 10 women's basketball tournament was played at campus sites on March 3, 2020, with the top two seeds receiving byes into the second round. The quarterfinals, semifinals and finals were played March 6–8, 2020, at UD Arena in Dayton, Ohio.

Date time, TV	Rank^{#}	Opponent^{#}	Result	Record	High points	High rebounds	High assists	Site (attendance) city, state
Non-conference regular season
November 5, 2019*; 5:30 p.m.		at UNC Greensboro	W 70–62	1–0	14 – Hinds-Clarke	6 – Hinds-Clarke	2 – tied	Fleming Gymnasium (221); Greensboro, NC
November 9, 2019*; 4:00 p.m.		at Charlotte	L 59–78	1–1	19 – Squires	7 – Hinds-Clarke	3 – Parson	Halton Arena (692); Charlotte, NC
November 12, 2019*; 7:00 p.m.		at Georgetown	W 51–49	2–1	17 – Hinds-Clarke	5 – tied	7 – Parson	McDonough Gymnasium (239); Washington, D.C.
November 16, 2019*; 6:00 p.m.		Florida Atlantic	W 57–55	3–1	14 – Hinds-Clarke	7 – tied	3 – tied	Robins Center (594); Richmond, VA
November 20, 2019*; 6:30 p.m.		William & Mary	W 76–73	4–1	21 – Klimkiewicz	9 – Clark	4 – Klimkiewicz	Robins Center (468); Richmond, VA
November 24, 2019*; 2:00 p.m.		at Drexel	L 52–58	4–2	14 – Squires	7 – Squires	5 – Carpenter	Daskalakis Athletic Center (701); Philadelphia, PA
November 29, 2019*; 2:00 p.m.		at Coastal Carolina; Coastal Carolina Thanksgiving Tournament	W 79–67	5–2	22 – Squires	7 – Hinds-Clarke	4 – tied	HTC Center (332); Conway, SC
December 1, 2019*; 11:30 a.m.		vs. Bradley; Coastal Carolina Thanksgiving Tournament	L 57–61	5–3	15 – Parson	9 – Chapman	2 – tied	HTC Center (44); Conway, SC
December 5, 2019*; 6:00 p.m.		at Maryland Eastern Shore	W 64–52	6–3	18 – Hinds-Clarke	10 – Squires	6 – Squires	Hytche Athletic Center (169); Princess Anne, MD
December 8, 2019*; 5:00 p.m.		Furman	L 69–70	6–4	17 – Klimkiewicz	7 – Duggan	4 – tied	Robins Center (5,056); Richmond, VA
December 19, 2019*; 5:00 p.m.		at Old Dominion; Anne Donovan Classic	L 51–73	6–5	12 – Klimkiewicz	7 – Chapman	3 – tied	Chartway Arena (1,795); Norfolk, VA
December 20, 2019*; 7:00 p.m.		vs. Mount St. Mary's; Anne Donovan Classic	L 67–75	6–6	17 – Holt	9 – Chapman	4 – Klimkiewicz	Chartway Arena; Norfolk, VA
December 21, 2019*; 4:00 p.m.		vs. Hampton; Anne Donovan Classic	L 65–69	6–7	20 – Holt	8 – Chapman	4 – tied	Chartway Arena (1,885); Norfolk, VA
December 30, 2019*; 6:30 p.m.		Norfolk State	W 77–69	7–7	21 – Hinds-Clarke	8 – Hinds-Clarke	5 – Parson	Robins Center (620); Richmond, VA
Atlantic 10 regular season
January 4, 2020; 2:00 p.m.		at Saint Joseph's	L 56–67	7–8 (0–1)	18 – Hinds-Clarke	4 – Duggan	3 – Squires	Hagan Arena (467); Philadelphia, PA
January 7, 2020; 7:00 p.m.		at Rhode Island	L 70–76 ^{OT}	7–9 (0–2)	23 – Holt	7 – tied	3 – tied	Ryan Center (312); Kingston, RI
January 12, 2020; 2:00 p.m.		Dayton	L 51–65	7–10 (0–3)	15 – Parson	8 – Chapman	2 – Squires	Robins Center (767); Richmond, VA
January 17, 2020; 6:00 p.m.		at VCU; Crosstown Showdown	L 50–53	7–11 (0–4)	19 – Hinds-Clarke	8 – Chapman	6 – Parson	Siegel Center (1,406); Richmond, VA
January 23, 2020; 11:00 a.m.		La Salle	W 63–61	8–11 (1–4)	11 – Hinds-Clarke	8 – tied	5 – Klimkiewicz	Robins Center (1,926); Richmond, VA
January 26, 2020; 2:00 p.m.		Davidson	W 69–57	9–11 (2–4)	14 – Holt	8 – Hinds-Clarke	3 – tied	Robins Center (765); Richmond, VA
January 29, 2020 noon, NBCSN		at UMass	L 50–64	9–12 (2–5)	15 – Klimkiewicz	6 – Neff	5 – Hinds-Clarke	Mullins Center (3,664); Amherst, MA
February 2, 2020; 1:00 p.m.		St. Bonaventure	W 63–59 ^{OT}	10–12 (3–5)	15 – Holt	10 – Chapman	4 – Chapman	Robins Center (680); Richmond, VA
February 5, 2020; 6:30 p.m.		VCU; Crosstown Showdown	L 42–57	10–13 (3–6)	16 – Holt	7 – Hinds-Clarke	3 – Chapman	Robins Center (1,450); Richmond, VA
February 9, 2020; 2:00 p.m.		at La Salle	W 67–61	11–13 (4–6)	20 – Holt	11 – Hinds-Clarke	4 – Hinds-Clarke	Tom Gola Arena (508); Philadelphia, PA
February 12, 2020; 6:30 p.m.		Duquesne	W 67–64 ^{OT}	12–13 (5–6)	21 – Carpenter	11 – Chapman	3 – tied	Robins Center (568); Richmond, VA
February 16, 2020; 2:00 p.m.		Fordham	L 47–64	12–14 (5–7)	14 – Hinds-Clarke	10 – Hinds-Clarke	3 – Parson	Robins Center (782); Richmond, VA
February 19, 2020; 7:00 p.m.		at George Mason	W 75–70	13–14 (6–7)	24 – Holt	7 – Hinds-Clarke	3 – tied	EagleBank Arena (932); Fairfax, VA
February 23, 2020; 1:00 p.m.		at St. Bonaventure	W 72–58	14–14 (7–7)	22 – Hinds-Clarke	12 – Hinds-Clarke	4 – Holt	Reilly Center (352); St. Bonaventure, NY
February 26, 2020; 6:30 p.m.		Saint Louis	L 57–60	14–15 (7–8)	20 – Hinds-Clarke	5 – tied	5 – Neff	Robins Center (522); Richmond, VA
February 29, 2020; 2:00 p.m.		at George Washington	L 40–50	14–16 (7–9)	9 – Hinds-Clarke	9 – Klimkiewicz	2 – Squires	Charles E. Smith Center (981); Washington, D.C.
Atlantic 10 tournament
March 3, 2020; 7:00 p.m., ESPN+	(9)	at (8) George Washington; First round	W 57–49	15–16	15 – Klimkiewicz	11 – Hinds-Clarke	3 – tied	Charles E. Smith Center (454); Washington, D.C.
March 6, 2020; 11:00 a.m., ESPN+	(9)	at (1) Dayton; Quarterfinal	L 68–79	15–17	20 – Hinds-Clarke	8 – Klimkiewicz	3 – tied	UD Arena (2,955); Dayton, OH
*Non-conference game. ^{#}Rankings from AP poll. (#) Tournament seedings in parentheses. All times are in Eastern.
