= 2020–21 Fordham Rams women's basketball team =

Intercollegiate basketball season

2020–21 Fordham Rams women's basketball
- Conference: Atlantic 10 Conference
- Record: 10-3 (7-2 A-10)
- Head coach: Stephanie Gaitley (10th season)
- Assistant coaches: Angelika Szumilo; Sonia Burke; Valerie Nainima
- Home arena: Rose Hill Gymnasium

2020–21 Atlantic 10 women's basketball standings
	Conf.				Overall
Team	W		L	PCT	W		L	PCT
Dayton	12	–	1	.923	14	–	5	.737
Fordham	8	–	2	.800	12	–	6	.667
Rhode Island	11	–	4	.733	11	–	8	.579
Saint Louis	9	–	3	.750	14	–	6	.700
VCU †	10	–	5	.667	16	–	11	.593
Richmond	9	–	6	.600	13	–	9	.591
UMass	7	–	5	.583	16	–	8	.667
Duquesne	4	–	7	.364	5	–	11	.313
Saint Joseph's	5	–	9	.357	7	–	10	.412
George Washington	5	–	9	.357	9	–	14	.391
La Salle	6	–	11	.353	11	–	15	.423
St. Bonaventure	6	–	11	.353	8	–	13	.381
Davidson	5	–	10	.333	8	–	15	.348
George Mason	0	–	14	.000	3	–	19	.136
† 2021 A10 Tournament winner As of July 7, 2024; Rankings from AP poll

The 2020–21 Fordham Rams women's basketball team represented Fordham University during the 2020-21 NCAA Division I women's basketball season. The Rams were led by tenth-year head coach Stephanie Gaitley. They were members of the Atlantic 10 Conference and played their home games at the Rose Hill Gymnasium.

== Schedule ==
Date time, TV	Rank^{#}	Opponent^{#}	Result	Record	Site (attendance) city, state
Non-conference regular season
Nov 25, 2020*; 2:00 pm, ESPN+		Stony Brook	W 62-58	1-0	Island Federal Credit Union Arena; Stony Brook, NY
Dec 2, 2020*; 2:00 pm, ESPN+		Manhattan	Cancelled due to COVID-19 issues		Rose Hill Gymnasium; Bronx, NY
Dec 5, 2020*; 2:00 pm		at Quinnipiac	L 58-62	1-1	People's United Center; Hamden, CT
Dec 8, 2021*; ESPN+		Fairleigh Dickinson	Cancelled due to COVID-19 issues		Rose Hill Gymnasium; Bronx, NY]
Dec 13, 2020*		at Seton Hall	Cancelled due to COVID-19 issues		Prudential Center; Newark, NJ
Dec 18, 2020*; 7:00 pm		Hofstra	W 72–58	2-1	Rose Hill Gymnasium; Bronx, NY
Atlantic 10 regular season
Dec 21, 2020; 12:00 pm		Davidson	L 64-79	2-2 (0-1)	Rose Hill Gymnasium; Bronx, NY
Non-conference regular season
Dec 22, 2020*; 1:00 pm		Albany	L 71-72	3-2	SEFCU Arena; Albany, NY
Atlantic 10 regular season
Jan 1, 2021; 1:00 pm		George Mason	W 62-32	4-2 (1-1)	Rose Hill Gymnasium (80); Bronx, NY
Jan 3, 2021; 2:00 pm		George Washington	W 53–47	5–2 (2–1)	Rose Hill Gymnasium; Bronx, NY
Jan 8, 2021; 1:00 pm		at Rhode Island	W 56-53	6–2 (3–1)	Ryan Center; Kingston, RI
Jan 10, 2021; 1:00 pm, ESPN+		Massachusetts	L 56-61	6–3 (3–2)	Mullins Center; Amherst, MA
Jan 16, 2021; 2:00 pm, ESPN+		Dayton	Postponed due to COVID-19 issues		UD Arena; Dayton, OH
Jan 17, 2021; 2:00 pm, ESPN+		Saint Louis	W 72-63	7–3 (4–2)	Chaifetz Arena; St. Louis, MO
Jan 22, 2021; 2:00 pm, ESPN+		St. Bonaventure	Postponed due to COVID-19 issues		Rose Hill Gymnasium; Bronx, NY
Jan 24, 2021; 1:00 pm, ESPN+		Duquesne	Postponed due to COVID-19 issues		Rose Hill Gymnasium; Bronx, NY
Jan 31, 2021; 12:00 pm, ESPN+		at Davidson	W 73-55	9-3 (6-2)	Belk Arena; Davidson, NC
Feb 5, 2021; 5:00 pm, ESPN+		at Richmond	Postponed due to COVID-19 issues		Robins Center; Richmond, VA
Feb 5, 2021; 12:00 pm, ESPN+		VCU	Postponed due to COVID-19 issues		Stuart C. Siegal Arena; Richmond, VA
Feb 5, 2021; 2:00 pm, ESPN+		Rhode Island	W 56-43	9-3 (7-2)	Rose Hill Gymnasium; Bronx, NY
Feb 12, 2021; 12:00 pm, ESPN+		VCU	L 52-62	12–4 (7–3)	Rose Hill Gymnasium (374); Bronx, NY
Feb 12, 2021; 2:00 pm, NBCSN+		Saint Joseph's	W 51-36	13-4 (8-3)	Rose Hill Gymnasium; Bronx, NY
Feb 14, 2021; 2:00 pm, ESPN+		La Salle	Postponed due to COVID-19 issues		Rose Hill Gymnasium; Bronx, NY
Feb 18, 2021; 6:00 pm		George Mason	Postponed due to COVID-19 issues		EagleBank Arena; Fairfax, VA
Feb 20, 2021; 12:00 pm		at George Washington	Postponed due to COVID-19 issues		Smith Center; Washington, DC
Feb 26, 2021; 2:00 pm		Dayton	Postponed due to COVID-19 issues		Rose Hill Gymnasium; Bronx, NY
Feb 28, 2021; 2:00 pm		St. Louis	Postponed due to COVID-19 issues		Rose Hill Gymnasium; Bronx, NY
Non-conference regular season
March 4, 2021*; 5:00 pm		at George Washington	W 48-43	14-4	Charles E. Smith Center; Washington, D.C.
Atlantic 10 Tournament
Mar 12, 2021; 5:00 p.m., ESPN+	(2)	vs. (7) Massachusetts; Quarterfinals	L 70-80	14–5	Siegel Center; Richmond, VA
WNIT
March 19, 2021; 11:00 am, FloHoops		vs. Delaware; First Round – Charlotte Regionals	L 49-77	14-6	Bojangles Coliseum; Charlotte, NC

== See also ==
- 2020–21 Fordham Rams men's basketball team
