= Sharon Dawley =

American college basketball coach

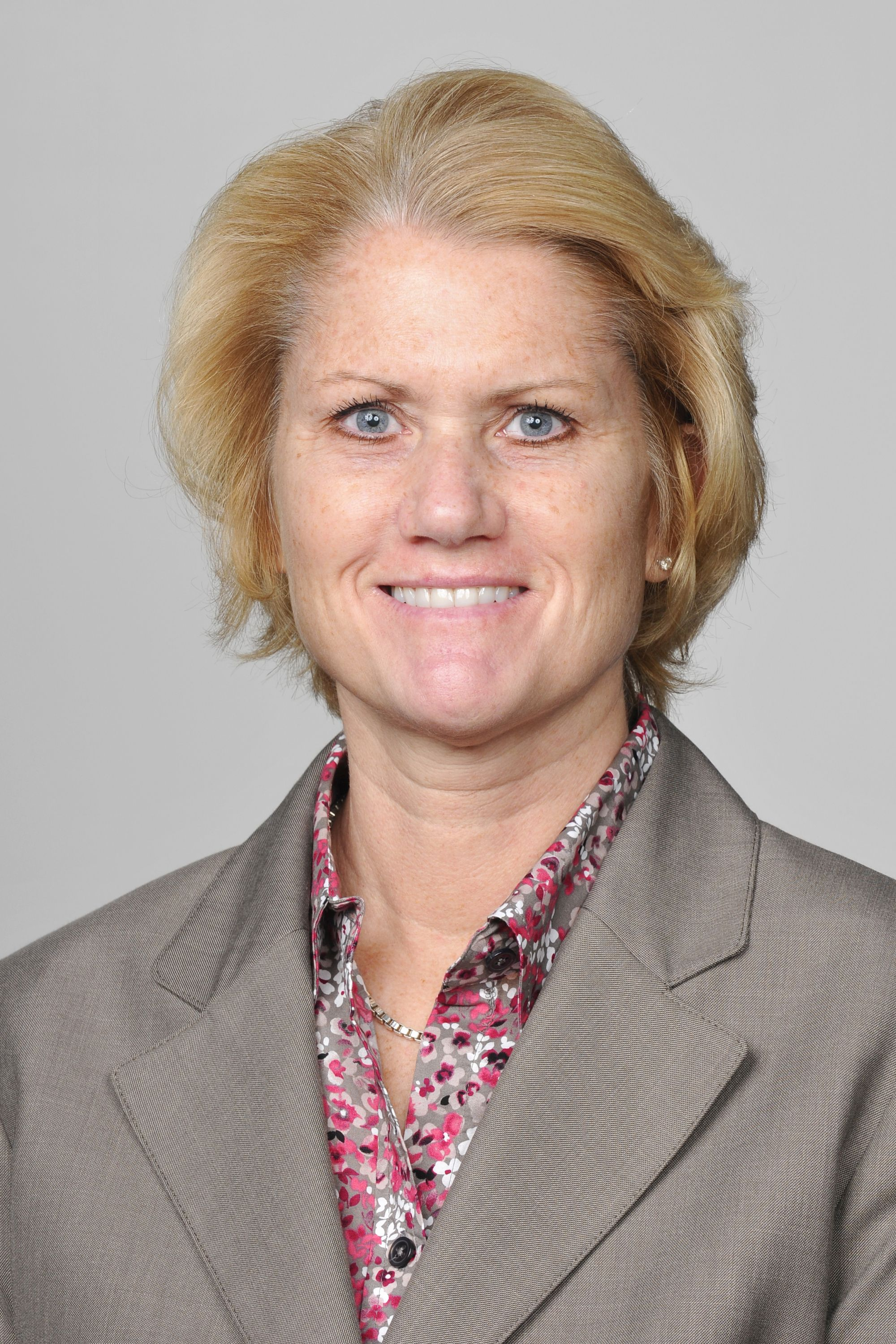

Biographical details
- Born: August 18, 1961 (age 65)

Playing career
- 1979–1983: Saint Anselm

Coaching career (HC unless noted)
- 1984–1993: Tufts
- 1993–2003: Dartmouth (asst./assoc. HC)
- 2003–2010: Vermont
- 2010–2016: UMass

Head coaching record
- Overall: 311–270

Sharon Dawley (born August 18, 1961) is the former head coach of the University of Massachusetts Amherst women's basketball team. She had previously served as head basketball coach for Tufts University, the assistant coach and associate head coach at Dartmouth College and the head coach for the University of Vermont.

== High school ==
Dawley attended Pope John High School in Everett, Massachusetts. Over the course of her time at school she earned varsity letters 11 different times in volleyball, basketball, track and softball. She served as a captain of every one of her for sports. She was named to the All-Star teams for both volleyball and basketball. When she graduated in 1979 she was named the top scholar-athlete for the school. She was inducted into the school's Hall of Fame in 1991.

== College career ==
Dawley attended St. Anselm College in Goffstown, New Hampshire, where she graduated in 1983 with a Bachelor of Arts degree in business. She played basketball for the division II Hawks for four years. When she was a senior, the team achieved a 22–6 record, which earned a national ranking of 15th in the division and won the ECAC Division II championship. Over the course of her career she scored 859 points which places her 20th on the school's all-time scoring list.

== Coaching career ==
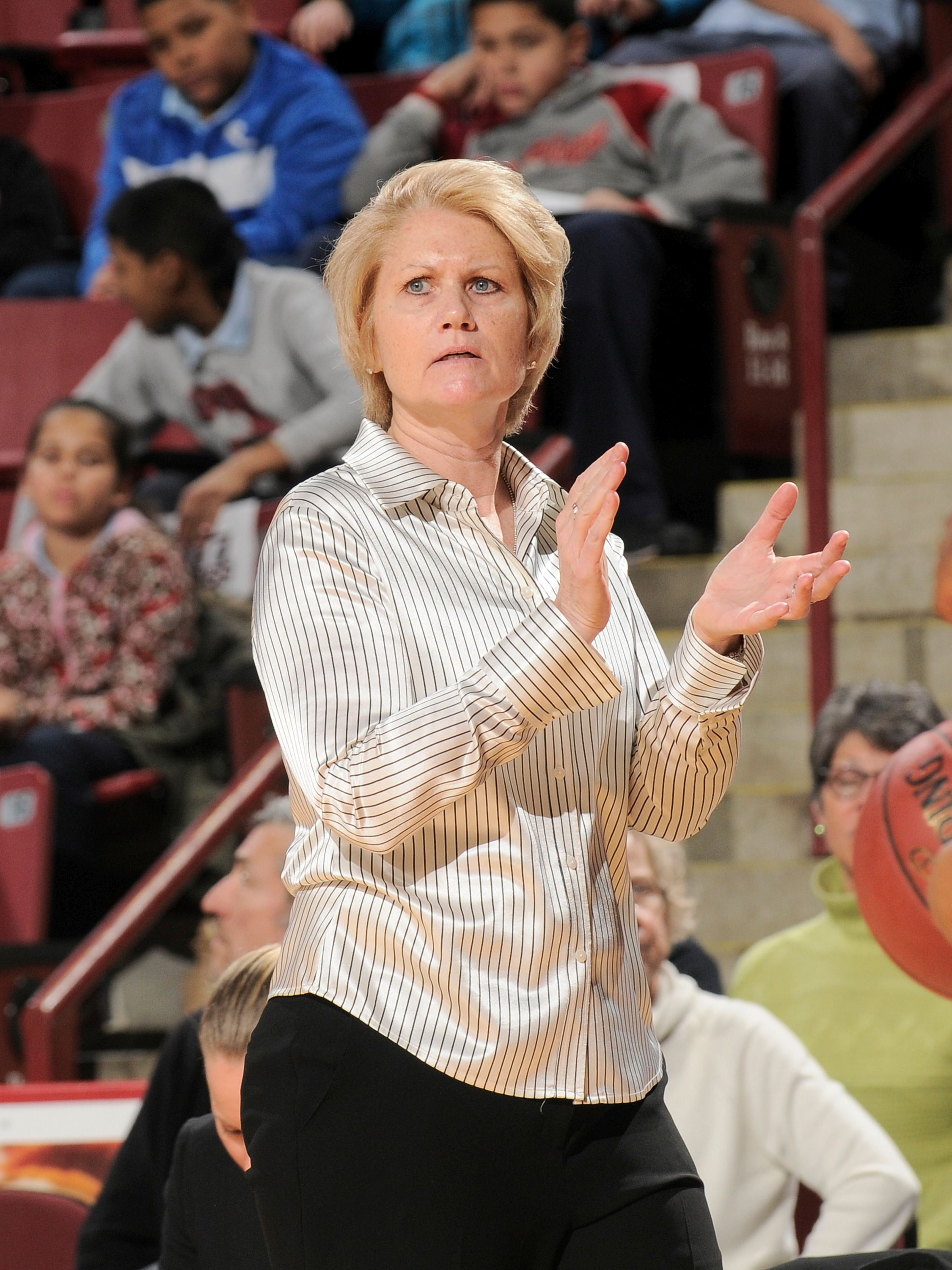
Sharon Dawley coaching from the sidelines

Dawley started her coaching career as the head coach for the Division III Tufts program. She was just 23 years old at the time, and found yourself running a program where six of the seniors were a year or more younger than she was. In addition to being the head basketball coach, she was also the assistant volleyball coach and later became the assistant lacrosse coach. Her duties also included intramural coordinator and strength coach which included teaching of strength classes and step aerobics. On top of all that she held down a part-time job at Raytheon as a computer programmer. She spent nine years at Tufts, with a winning season every year and an overall record of 137–63.

Dawley was then ready to move on, and applied for the head coaching position at Division I Dartmouth. She was viewed as one of the top candidates. However Chris Wielgus, who had been the head coach of Dartmouth between 1976 and 1994 before leaving for two years at Fordham, decided to return to Dartmouth. Dawley was disappointed not to get the head coaching position but accepted a position as an assistant coach. She remained an assistant coach for four years, then was promoted to the position of associate head coach, which she held for the next six years. While she was at Dartmouth, the team record was 153–116. The team earned invitations to the NCAA tournament in 1995, 1999, and 2000

In 2003, she accepted the head coaching position at the University of Vermont. In our first three years the team records were 14–13, 14–15 and 9–18. However, once her own recruits were on the team, she improved to a 19–12 record, then she had three consecutive years with 20 or more wins. After the 2008 season in which the team went 24–9 and made it to the second round of the WNIT she received a call informing her she was being inducted into the New England basketball Hall of Fame. She was stunned but pleased by the honor and invited her whole family to the induction ceremony. In the 2009–10 season the team won 27 games, finished as America East champions, and went to the NCAA tournament where they upset the seventh-seeded Wisconsin team 64–55.

In 2010, Dawley returned to her home state of Massachusetts to accept the head coaching position at the University of Massachusetts. The team is rebuilding, with only single-digit wins in her first four years, but improved to 12–8 in the 2014–15 year. Chris Wielgus, Who had been her head coach at Dartmouth has returned to become an assistant coach under Dawley. She also has Yolanda Griffith, who starred in the ABL, and WNBA and earned the WNBA MVP, as an assistant.

After six seasons and a 46–133 record, UMass fired Dawley.

== Awards and honors ==
- 2009 New England Basketball Hall of Fame
