= 2020 Atlantic 10 women's basketball tournament =

- Classification: Division I
- Season: 2019–20
- Teams: 14
- Site: Campus Sites
- Finals site: UD Arena; Dayton, Ohio
- Champions: Dayton (3rd title)
- Winning coach: Shauna Green (2nd title)
- Television: CBSSN, ESPN+, ESPNU

2019–20 Atlantic 10 women's basketball standings
	Conf.				Overall
Team	W		L	PCT	W		L	PCT
Dayton†	15	–	1	.938	25	–	8	.758
VCU	13	–	3	.813	20	–	12	.625
Fordham	11	–	5	.688	21	–	10	.677
Duquesne	9	–	7	.563	20	–	11	.645
Massachusetts	9	–	7	.563	20	–	11	.645
Saint Louis	9	–	7	.563	19	–	13	.594
Davidson	8	–	8	.500	16	–	15	.516
George Washington	8	–	8	.500	14	–	16	.467
Richmond	7	–	9	.438	15	–	17	.469
La Salle	7	–	9	.438	13	–	17	.433
Rhode Island	6	–	10	.375	13	–	16	.448
St. Bonaventure	4	–	12	.250	7	–	23	.233
Saint Joseph's	3	–	13	.188	9	–	20	.310
George Mason	3	–	13	.188	9	–	21	.300
† 2020 A10 tournament winner Rankings from AP poll

The 2020 Atlantic 10 women's basketball tournament was a postseason tournament that concluded the 2019-20 season of the Atlantic 10 Conference. It was played at campus sites on March 3 for the first round, with the remaining games held on March 6–8 at the UD Arena in Dayton, Ohio. Dayton won the conference tournament to receive an automatic bid to the NCAA Tournament.

== Seeds ==
Teams were seeded by record within the conference, with a tiebreaker system to seed teams with identical conference records.

Seed	School	Conf	Overall	Tiebreaker
1	Dayton^{‡†}	15–1	22–8	
2	VCU^{†}	13–3	18–11	
3	Fordham	11–5	19–10	
4	Saint Louis	9–7	17–12	2–0 vs. UMass & Duquesne
5	UMass	9–7	19–10	1–1 vs. Duquesne & Saint Louis
6	Duquesne	9–7	19–10	0–1 vs. UMass & Saint Louis
7	Davidson	8–8	15–14	1–0 vs. George Washington
#8	George Washington	8–8	14–15	0–1 vs. Davidson
#9	Richmond	7–9	14–16	2–0 vs. La Salle
#10	La Salle	7–9	13–16	0–2 vs. Richmond
#11	Rhode Island	6–10	13–15	
#12	St. Bonaventure	4–12	7–22	
#13	George Mason	3–13	9–19	1–0 vs. St. Joseph's
#14	St. Joseph's	3–13	9–20	0–1 vs. George Mason
‡ – Atlantic 10 regular season champions, and tournament No. 1 seed. † – Received a single-bye in the conference tournament.

== Schedule ==
Session	Game	Time*	Matchup^{#}	Television	Attendance
First round - Tuesday, March 3
1		7:00 pm	No. 9 Richmond 57 at No. 8 George Washington 49	ESPN+	454
2		8:00 pm	No. 13 George Mason 61 at No. 4 Saint Louis 69	ESPN+	589
3		7:00 pm	No. 12 St. Bonaventure 54 at No. 5 UMass 72	ESPN+	680
4		7:00 pm	No. 10 La Salle 63 at No. 7 Davidson 67	ESPN+	407
5		7:00 pm	No. 14 St. Joseph's 39 at No. 3 Fordham 56	ESPN+	895
6		7:00 pm	No. 11 Rhode Island 53 at No. 6 Duquesne 70	ESPN+	609
Quarterfinals - Friday, March 6
7	7	11:00 am	No. 9 Richmond 68 at No. 1 Dayton 79	ESPN+	
7	8	2:00 pm	No. 5 UMass 52 vs. No. 4 Saint Louis 65	ESPN+	
8	9	4:30 pm	No. 7 Davidson 52 vs. No. 2 VCU 58	ESPN+	
8	10	7:00 pm	No. 6 Duquesne 47 vs. No. 3 Fordham 54	ESPN+	
Semifinals - Saturday, March 7
9	11	11:00 am	No. 1 Dayton 58 vs No. 4 Saint Louis 50	CBSSN	
9	12	1:30 pm	No. 2 VCU 59 vs No. 3 Fordham 55	CBSSN	
Championship - Sunday, March 8
10	13	12:00 pm	No. 1 Dayton 52 vs No. 2 VCU 48	ESPNU	

*Game times in Eastern Time. #Rankings denote tournament seeding.

== Bracket ==
- All times are Eastern.

First round Campus Sites; March 3 ESPN+
8	George Washington	49
9	Richmond	57
5	UMass	72
12	St. Bonaventure	54
4	Saint Louis	69
13	George Mason	61
6	Duquesne	70
11	Rhode Island	53
3	Fordham	59
14	Saint Joseph's	36
7	Davidson	67
10	La Salle	63

Quarterfinals; University of Dayton Arena; March 6 ESPN+
1	Dayton	79
9	Richmond	68
5	UMass	52
4	Saint Louis	65
6	Duquesne	47
3	Fordham	54
7	Davidson	52
2	VCU	58

Semifinals; University of Dayton Arena; March 7 CBSSN
1	Dayton	58
4	Saint Louis	50
3	Fordham	55
2	VCU	60

Championship; University of Dayton Arena; March 8 ESPNU
1	Dayton	52
2	VCU	48

== See also ==
2019 Atlantic 10 men's basketball tournament
