= UMass Minutewomen basketball =

American college basketball team

2025–26 UMass Minutewomen basketball team
- University: University of Massachusetts Amherst
- Head coach: Mike Leflar (3rd season)
- Location: Amherst, Massachusetts
- Arena: William D. Mullins Memorial Center (capacity: 9,493)
- Conference: MAC
- Nickname: Minutewomen
- Colors: Maroon and white

NCAA Division I tournament appearances
- 1996, 1998, 2022

Conference tournament champions
- 2022

Conference regular-season champions
- 2023

Conference division champions
- 1998

Uniforms
Home	Away

The UMass Minutewomen basketball team represents the University of Massachusetts Amherst in Amherst, Massachusetts, in NCAA Division I women's college basketball. They play their home games in the William D. Mullins Memorial Center. The Minutewomen currently compete in the Mid-American Conference.

== History ==
UMass has played women's basketball since 1968. They have made the NCAA Tournament three times, in 1996, 1998 and 2022. In the former, they lost 60–57 to Michigan State in the First Round. In 1998, they lost 77–59 to Iowa in the First Round. They have one appearance in the WNIT (1995), beating VCU 70-61 but losing 80–59 to Texas A&M and 90–72 to Notre Dame. They won their first conference tournament in 2022, having previously captured the East Division in 1998. As of the end of the 2015–16 season, the Minutewomen have an all-time record of 535-707.

== Season-by-season results ==
Record table
Season	Coach	Overall	Conference	Standing	Postseason
Barbara Stevens (Atlantic 10) (1983–1986)
1983–84	Barbara Stevens	10–17	3–5	T-6th	
1984–85	Barbara Stevens	13–15	2–6	T-6th	
1985–86	Barbara Stevens	11–17	4–12	T 7th	
Barbara Stevens:		34–49 (.410)	9–23 (.281)		
Sharon Dawley (Atlantic 10) (2010–2016)
2010–11	Sharon Dawley	7–23	3-11	11th	
2011–12	Sharon Dawley	7–22	3–11	12th	
2012–13	Sharon Dawley	3–26	1–13	15th	
2013–14	Sharon Dawley	4–27	1–15	12th	
2014–15	Sharon Dawley	12–18	5–11	13th	
2015–16	Sharon Dawley	12–18	5–11	T 10th	
Sharon Dawley:		45–134 (.251)	18–72 (.200)		
Tory Verdi (Atlantic 10) (2016–2023)
2016–17	Tory Verdi	9–21	3–13	13th	
2017–18	Tory Verdi	14–16	6–10	10th	
2018–19	Tory Verdi	16–16	7–9	T-8th	
2019–20	Tory Verdi	20–11	9–7	T-4th	
2020–21	Tory Verdi	16–8	7–5	7th	WNIT First Round
2021–22	Tory Verdi	26–7	11–4	3rd	NCAA First Round
2022–23	Tory Verdi	27–7	14–2	T-1st	WNIT Second Round
Tory Verdi:		128–86 (.598)	57–48 (.543)	WNIT (3–2) / NCAA (0–1)	
Mike Leflar (Atlantic 10) (2023–present)
2023–24	Mike Leflar	5–27	2–16	14th	
2024–25	Mike Leflar	15–12	10–6	6th	
Mike Leflar:		20–39 (.339)	12–22 (.353)		
Total:		5–27 (.156)			
National champion Postseason invitational champion Conference regular season champion Conference regular season and conference tournament champion Division regular season champion Division regular season and conference tournament champion Conference tournament champion

== Postseason ==
=== NCAA tournament appearances ===
The Minutewomen have made 3 appearances in the NCAA Division I women's basketball tournament. Their combined record is 0–3.

Year	Seed	Round	Opponent	Result
1996	#8	First Round	(9) Michigan State	L 57–60
1998	#13	First Round	(4) Iowa	L 59–77
2022	#12	First Round	(5) Notre Dame	L 78-89

==== WNIT ====
The UMass Minutewomen have made 3 appearances in the Women's National Invitation Tournament. Their combined record is 2-3 not including consolation games.

Year	Round	Opponent	Result
2021	First Round; Consolation Games*	Villanova; Charlotte*; Ohio*	L 58–71; W 81–75; W 95–71
2023	First Round; Second Round	Albany; Harvard	W 73–48; L 87–89
2025	First Round; Second Round	Stonehill; Buffalo	W 86–40; L 84–82

== Awards and honors ==
=== Conference awards ===
==== Players ====
A10 Player of the Year

- Sam Breen – 2022, 2023

A10 Rookie of the Year

- Yahmani McKayle – 2025

==== Coaches ====
A10 Coach of the Year
- Tory Verdi – 2022
