= The King's Christian School =

Christian school in Camden County, New Jersey, United States

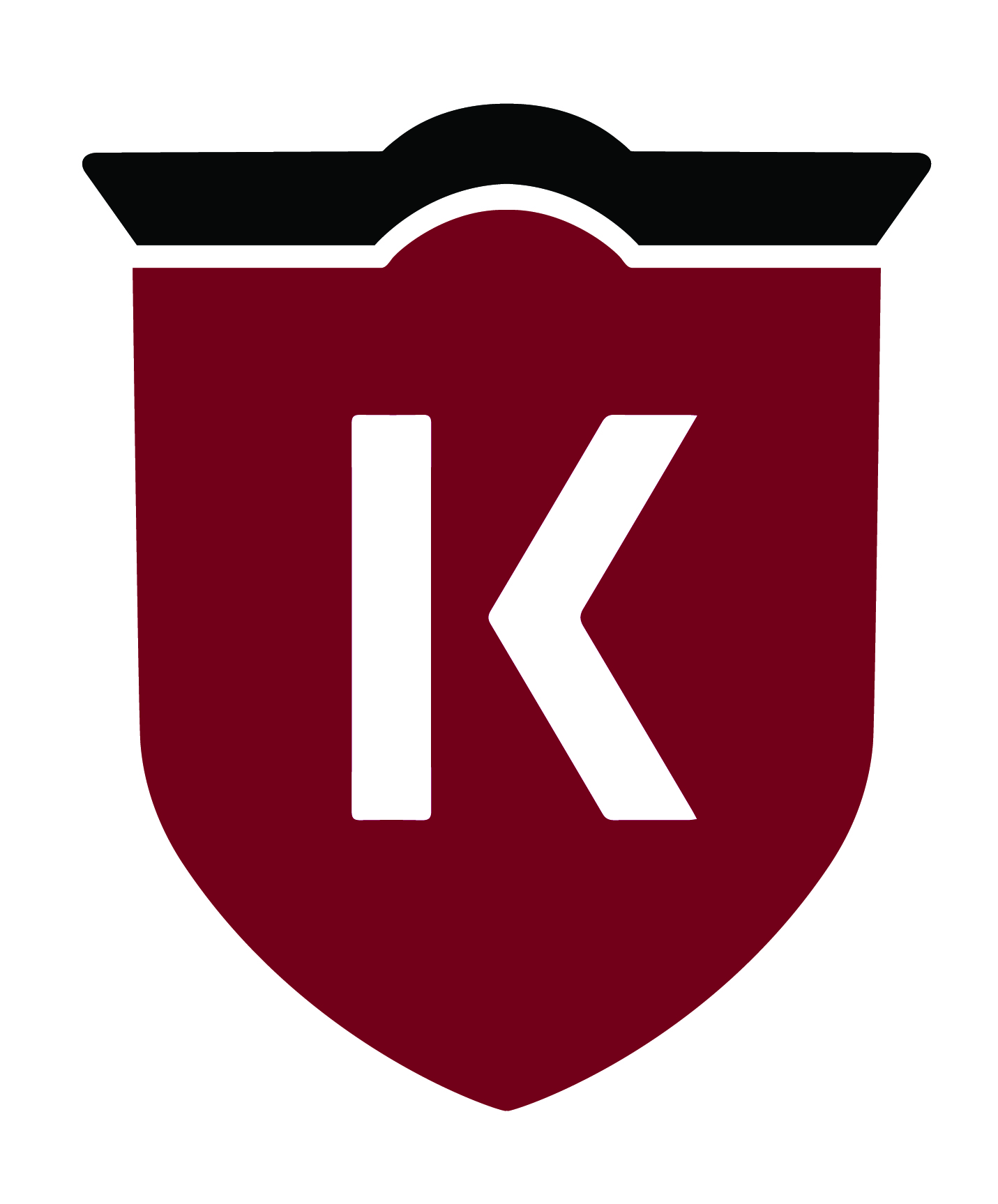

Location
- 5 Carnegie Plaza; Cherry Hill, Camden County, New Jersey 08003-1020; United States
- 39.915102°N 74.961305°W

Information
- Type: Christian school
- Denomination: Non-denominational
- Established: 1946
- NCES School ID: A1902888
- Principal: Craig Beatty
- Head of school: Ray Casey
- Faculty: 42.5 FTEs
- Grades: PreK–12
- Enrollment: 501 (plus 57 in PreK, as of 2023–24)
- Student to teacher ratio: 11.8:1
- Athletics conference: Jersey United Christian Athletic Conference
- Team name: Knights
- Accreditation: Middle States Association of Colleges and Schools
- Tuition: $14,550 (grades 9–12 for 2025–26)
- Website: www.tkcs.org

The King's Christian School is a private school located in Cherry Hill, in Camden County, in the U.S. state of New Jersey, that serves students in pre-kindergarten through twelfth grade. King's is owned and operated by The Association of The King's Christian School, a non-profit organization governed by a board of directors and made up of the parents and friends of the school; it is not associated with any particular main-line Protestant denomination or church. The school is housed on a single campus for pre-kindergarten to 12th grade students at 5 Carnegie Plaza in Cherry Hill.

The King's Christian School is approved under the authority of the New Jersey Department of Education and is accredited by the Association of Christian Schools International (ACSI) and by the Middle States Association of Colleges and Schools (MSACS) Commission on Elementary and Secondary Schools (through July 2028).

King's offers a fully integrated college preparatory curriculum with an evangelical Christian worldview and required Biblical education at all grade levels.

As of the 2023–24 school year, the school had an enrollment of 501 students (plus 57 in PreK) and 42.5 classroom teachers (on an FTE basis), for a student–teacher ratio of 11.8:1.

== Athletics ==
The King's Christian High School Knights compete in the Jersey United Christian Athletic Conference in Boys' and Girls' Soccer, Basketball, Track and Field, Cross Country, Boys' Baseball, Girls' Softball, and Cheerleading. King's is also a member of the National Christian School Athletic Association.

== History ==
Founded as the Christian Day School of Camden County, the school opened in 1946 at Immanuel Presbyterian Church in the West Collingswood section of Haddon Township.

In its early years, the school also met in rooms at Mt. Calvary Union Church in Runnemede, Moorestown Public School, Haddon Heights Baptist Church (1948), Fairview Community Baptist Church in Camden (1949), and Crescent Park Orthodox Presbyterian Church in Bellmawr (1950).

In 1951, the school moved to a historic mansion at 800 West King's Highway, Haddon Heights. Adjacent to the mansion, a purpose-built modern school building for grades K-8 opened in 1970, bearing the name Christian School of Camden County (CSCC). This building now houses the Brookfield Schools elementary school.

In 1974, CSCC opened another elementary school campus at Easton Union Church in Hainesport Township in neighboring Burlington County, which operated until 1992.

In 1980, the school achieved ACSI and MSACS accreditation. Having grown to attract students from well beyond Camden County, CSCC surveyed its students and their families and chose as its new name The King's Christian School.

In 1983, King's rented the former Barclay Elementary School in the Barclay Farm neighborhood of Cherry Hill for use as a Junior High and High School, housing grades 7-12. The Cherry Hill Public Schools now operate this site as the Estelle V. Malberg Early Childhood Center.

Before moving to its current campus, King's high school was temporarily housed at the Sacred Heart School, Mount Ephraim, between 1999 and 2003.

== Notable alumni ==
- Pamela Havey Lau, author, speaker and mediator
- Bob Pritchett (class of 1988), co-founder of Faithlife Corporation, which produces Logos Bible Software
