= 2021 Atlantic 10 women's basketball tournament =

- Classification: Division I
- Season: 2020–21
- Teams: 14
- Finals site: Siegel Center; Richmond, Virginia
- Champions: VCU (1st title)
- Winning coach: Beth O'Boyle (1st title)
- Television: CBSSN, ESPN+, ESPNU

2020–21 Atlantic 10 women's basketball standings
	Conf.				Overall
Team	W		L	PCT	W		L	PCT
Dayton	12	–	1	.923	14	–	5	.737
Fordham	8	–	2	.800	12	–	6	.667
Rhode Island	11	–	4	.733	11	–	8	.579
Saint Louis	9	–	3	.750	14	–	6	.700
VCU †	10	–	5	.667	16	–	11	.593
Richmond	9	–	6	.600	13	–	9	.591
UMass	7	–	5	.583	16	–	8	.667
Duquesne	4	–	7	.364	5	–	11	.313
Saint Joseph's	5	–	9	.357	7	–	10	.412
George Washington	5	–	9	.357	9	–	14	.391
La Salle	6	–	11	.353	11	–	15	.423
St. Bonaventure	6	–	11	.353	8	–	13	.381
Davidson	5	–	10	.333	8	–	15	.348
George Mason	0	–	14	.000	3	–	19	.136
† 2021 A10 Tournament winner As of July 7, 2024; Rankings from AP poll

The 2021 Atlantic 10 women's basketball tournament was a postseason tournament that concluded the 2020-21 season of the Atlantic 10 Conference. It will be played at Siegel Center in Richmond, Virginia, March 10–14, 2021. VCU won the tournament, its first-ever title.

== Seeds ==
Teams were seeded by record within the conference, with a tiebreaker system to seed teams with identical conference records.

Seed	School	Conf	Overall	Tiebreaker
1	Dayton^{‡†}	12–1		
2	Fordham^{†}	8–2		
3	Saint Louis^{†}	9–3		
4	Rhode Island^{†}	11–4		
5	VCU	10–5		
6	Richmond	9–6		
7	UMass	7–5		
8	La Salle	7–10		
9	Duquesne	4–7		
10	Saint Joseph's	5–9		1–0 vs. GW
11	George Washington	5–9		
12	Davidson	5–10		
13	St. Bonaventure	5–12		
14	George Mason	0–14		
‡ – Atlantic 10 regular season champions, and tournament No. 1 seed. † – Received a single-bye in the conference tournament.

== Schedule ==
Session	Game	Time	Matchup	Score	Television	Attendance
First round – Wednesday, March 10
1	1	1:00 pm	No. 12 Davidson vs No. 13 St. Bonaventure	69–61	ESPN+	250
1	2	4:00 pm	No. 11 George Washington vs No. 14 George Mason	62–56	ESPN+	250
Second round – Thursday, March 11
2	3	11:00 am	No. 8 La Salle vs No. 9 Duquesne	72–68^{OT}	ESPN+	250
2	4	2:00 pm	No. 5 VCU vs No. 12 Davidson	69–52	ESPN+	250
3	5	5:00 pm	No. 7 Massachusetts vs No. 10 Saint Joseph's	79–69^{OT}	ESPN+	250
3	6	8:00 pm	No. 6 Richmond vs No. 11 George Washington	58–54^{OT}	ESPN+	250
Quarterfinals – Friday, March 12
4	7	11:00 am	No. 1 Dayton vs No. 8 La Salle	85-70	ESPN+	250
4	8	2:00 pm	No. 4 Rhode Island vs No. 5 VCU	57–64^{OT}	ESPN+	250
5	9	5:00 pm	No. 2 Fordham vs No. 7 Massachusetts	70–80	ESPN+	250
5	10	8:00 pm	No. 3 Saint Louis vs No. 6 Richmond	59–58^{OT}	ESPN+	250
Semifinals – Saturday, March 13
6	11	1:00 pm	No. 1 Dayton vs No. 5 VCU	50–56	CBSSN	250
6	12	4:00 pm	No. 3 Saint Louis vs No. 7 Massachusetts	81–90	CBSSN	250
Championship – Sunday, March 14
7	13	12:00 pm	No. 5 VCU vs No. 7 Massachusetts	81–69	ESPNU	

*Game times in Eastern Time.

== Bracket ==
- All times are Eastern.

First round
12	Davidson	69
13	St. Bonaventure	61
11	George Washington	62
14	George Mason	56

Second round
8	La Salle	72*
9	Duquesne	68
5	VCU	69
12	Davidson	52
7	Massachusetts	79*
10	Saint Joseph's	69
6	Richmond	58*
11	George Washington	54

Quarterfinals
1	Dayton	85
8	La Salle	70
4	Rhode Island	57
5	VCU	64*
2	Fordham	70
7	Massachusetts	80
3	Saint Louis	59*
6	Richmond	58

Semifinals
1	Dayton	50
5	VCU	56
7	Massachusetts	90
3	Saint Louis	81

Final
5	VCU	81
7	Massachusetts	69

* denotes overtime period

== See also ==
- 2021 Atlantic 10 men's basketball tournament
