= VCU Rams women's basketball =

| 2026–27 VCU Rams women's basketball team |
- University: Virginia Commonwealth University
- Head coach: Chelsea Banbury (1st season)
- Location: Richmond, Virginia
- Arena: Stuart C. Siegel Center (capacity: Expandable to 8,000)
- Conference: Atlantic 10
- Nickname: Rams
- Colors: Black and gold
- Student section: The Rowdy Rams

NCAA Division I tournament appearances
- 2009, 2021

Conference tournament champions
- Atlantic 10: 2021

Conference regular-season champions
- 2019

Uniforms
| Home | Away |

The VCU Rams women's basketball team is the intercollegiate women's basketball program that represents Virginia Commonwealth University. The Rams play in the Atlantic 10 Conference.

== History ==
VCU began play in 1974. They have made the NCAA Tournament twice (2009 and 2021), while making the WNIT six times (2008, 2010, 2011, 2012, 2014, and 2019). They joined the CAA in 1995, playing until 2012, when they joined the Atlantic 10 Conference.

== NCAA tournament results ==
The Rams have made the NCAA Division I women's basketball tournament two times, and have an overall record of 0–2.

| Year | Seed | Round | Opponent | Result |
|---|---|---|---|---|
| 2009 | #10 | First Round | #7 Rutgers | L 51−57 |
| 2021 | #13 | First Round | #4 Indiana | L 32−62 |
