= 2023–24 Maine Black Bears women's basketball team =

American college basketball season

2023–24 Maine Black Bears women's basketball

American East regular-season and tournament champions

NCAA tournament, first round
- Conference: America East Conference
- Record: 24–10 (14–2 America East)
- Head coach: Amy Vachon (7th season)
- Associate head coach: Courtney England
- Assistant coaches: Tom Biskup; Gadson Lefft
- Home arena: Memorial Gymnasium

2023–24 America East Conference women's basketball standings
	Conf.				Overall
Team	W		L	PCT	W		L	PCT
Maine †	14	–	2	.875	24	–	10	.706
Albany	13	–	3	.813	25	–	7	.781
Vermont	12	–	4	.750	25	–	12	.676
Bryant	8	–	8	.500	15	–	15	.500
Binghamton	8	–	8	.500	14	–	17	.452
UMBC	6	–	10	.375	10	–	19	.345
NJIT	4	–	12	.250	12	–	18	.400
UMass Lowell	4	–	12	.250	4	–	25	.138
New Hampshire	3	–	13	.188	9	–	20	.310
† 2024 AmEast tournament winner

The 2023–24 Maine Black Bears women's basketball team represented the University of Maine during the 2023–24 NCAA Division I women's basketball season. The Black Bears, led by seventh-year head coach Amy Vachon, played their home games at The Pit in Memorial Gymnasium in Orono, Maine, with one game at the Cross Insurance Center in Bangor, Maine as members of the America East Conference.

The Black Bears finished the season 24–10, 14–2 in America East play, to finish as America East regular-season champions. They defeated UMass Lowell, Binghamton and Vermont to win the America East tournament and earn the conference's automatic bid to the NCAA tournament. They received the #15 seed in the Portland Regional 3, where they fell to #2 region seed Ohio State in the first round.

== Previous season ==
The Black Bears finished the 2022–23 season 16–14, 11–5 in America East play, to finish in third place. They defeated Binghamton in the quarterfinals, before falling to Albany in the semifinals of the America East tournament.

== Roster ==
2023–24 Maine Black Bears women's basketball team
Players
Coaches

Pos.	#	Name	Height	Year	Previous school	Hometown
G	0	Sera Hodgson	6 ft 0 in (1.83 m)	Jr	New Hampton School	Rindge, NH
G	1	Olivia Rockwood	5 ft 7 in (1.7 m)	Sr	Windsor High School	Windsor, VT
G	2	Emmie Streams	5 ft 4 in (1.63 m)	Fr	Bangor High School	Veazie, ME
G	3	Anne Simon	5 ft 9 in (1.75 m)	GS	Sportlycee	Sandweiler, Luxembourg
G	4	Jaycie Christopher	5 ft 10 in (1.78 m)	So	Skowhegan High School	Skowhegan, ME
G	10	Anna Kahelin	5 ft 11 in (1.8 m)	GS	Helsinki Basketball Academy Märsky	Helsinki, Finland
G	12	Sarah Talon	5 ft 10 in (1.78 m)	So	Windham High School	Windham, ME
G/F	13	Caroline Bornemann	5 ft 10 in (1.78 m)	Sr	Rungsted Gymnasium	Hørsholm, Denmark
G	15	Paula Gallego	6 ft 0 in (1.83 m)	Jr	Col·legi Pineda	Barcelona, Spain
G	20	Aislinn Gibson	6 ft 2 in (1.88 m)	Fr	Tilton School	Hingham, MA
F	21	Milana Nenadic	6 ft 3 in (1.91 m)	So	Cameron Heights Collegiate Institute	Kitchener, ON
F	25	Caroline Dotsey	6 ft 2 in (1.88 m)	Fr	Haverford High School	Havertown, PA
G	30	Anna Soler	5 ft 8 in (1.73 m)	Jr	Eastern Wyoming College	Barcelona, Spain
F	33	Adrianna Smith	6 ft 0 in (1.83 m)	Jr	Bishop O'Connell High School	Reston, VA
G	45	Idan Shlush	5 ft 8 in (1.73 m)	Jr	St. John's	Gedera, Israel

Head coach

- Amy Vachon (Maine)

Assistant coach(es)

- Courtney England (Maine)
- Tom Biskup (Maine)
- Gadson Lefft (Maine)

Legend

- (C) Team captain
- (S) Suspended
- (I) Ineligible
- (W) Walk-on
- Injured
- Current redshirt

Roster
Last update: December 11, 2023

== Schedule and results ==
Date time, TV	Rank^{#}	Opponent^{#}	Result	Record	Site (attendance) city, state
Non-conference regular season
November 6, 2023*; 5:30 p.m., ESPN+		at Quinnipiac	L 57–70	0–1	M&T Bank Arena (603); Hamden, CT
November 9, 2023*; 4:30 p.m., ESPN+		at La Salle	W 58–48	1–1	Tom Gola Arena (247); Philadelphia, PA
November 12, 2023*; 1:00 p.m., ESPN+		UMass	W 69–48	2–1	Memorial Gymnasium (993); Orono, ME
November 14, 2023*; 6:00 p.m., ESPN+		Rhode Island	W 59–48	3–1	Memorial Gymnasium (930); Orono, ME
November 24, 2023*; 5:30 p.m., ESPN+		vs. Richmond; Vibrant Thanksgiving Classic	L 43–77	3–2	Knapp Center (1,734); Des Moines, IA
November 25, 2023*; 12:30 p.m., ESPN+		vs. Louisiana Tech; Vibrant Thanksgiving Classic	W 60–54	4–2	Knapp Center (1,505); Des Moines, IA
November 26, 2023*; 3:00 p.m., ESPN+		at Drake; Vibrant Thanksgiving Classic	L 56–72	4–3	Knapp Center (1,765); Des Moines, IA
November 30, 2023*; 7:00 p.m., ESPN+		No. 17 Indiana	L 59–67	4–4	Cross Insurance Arena (5,983); Portland, ME
December 2, 2023*; 2:00 p.m., YES/ESPN+		at Fordham	W 74–62	5–4	Rose Hill Gymnasium (264); The Bronx, NY
December 6, 2023*; 6:15 p.m., ESPN+		Harvard	W 79–61	6–4	Memorial Gymnasium (907); Orono, ME
December 17, 2023*; 1:00 p.m., ESPN+		James Madison	L 71–78	6–5	Memorial Gymnasium (984); Orono, ME
December 20, 2023*; 3:30 p.m.		vs. Duquesne; Tulane Holiday Tournament	W 80–72	7–5	Devlin Fieldhouse (712); New Orleans, LA
December 21, 2023*; 2:30 p.m., ESPN+		at Tulane; Tulane Holiday Tournament	L 61–64	7–6	Devlin Fieldhouse (782); New Orleans, LA
December 30, 2023*; 1:00 p.m., ESPN+		at Penn	L 69–72	7–7	The Palestra (612); Philadelphia, PA
America East Conference regular season
January 4, 2024; 6:00 p.m., ESPN+		at UMass Lowell	W 55–43	8–7 (1–0)	Costello Athletic Center (202); Lowell, MA
January 6, 2024; 1:00 p.m., ESPN+		Vermont	W 60–48	9–7 (2–0)	Memorial Gymnasium (1,207); Orono, ME
January 11, 2024; 6:00 p.m., ESPN+		at New Hampshire	W 78–52	10–7 (3–0)	Lundholm Gym (311); Durham, NH
January 18, 2024; 6:00 p.m., ESPN+		UMBC	W 76–47	11–7 (4–0)	Memorial Gymnasium (1,045); Orono, ME
January 20, 2024; 1:00 p.m., ESPN+		NJIT	W 81–39	12–7 (5–0)	Memorial Gymnasium (1,237); Orono, ME
January 25, 2024; 7:00 p.m., ESPN+		at Albany	L 47–54	12–8 (5–1)	Broadview Center (1,222); Albany, NY
January 27, 2024; 2:00 p.m., ESPN+		at Binghamton	W 59–56	13–8 (6–1)	Binghamton University Events Center (1,118); Vestal, NY
February 1, 2024; 6:00 p.m., ESPN+		UMass Lowell	W 68–49	14–8 (7–1)	Memorial Gymnasium (1,072); Orono, ME
February 3, 2024; 2:00 p.m., ESPN+		at Bryant	W 70–58	15–8 (8–1)	Chace Athletic Center (308); Smithfield, RI
February 10, 2024; 2:00 p.m., ESPN+		New Hampshire	W 67–48	16–8 (9–1)	Memorial Gymnasium (1,425); Orono, ME
February 15, 2024; 6:00 p.m., ESPN+		Bryant	W 80–57	17–8 (10–1)	Memorial Gymnasium (1,156); Orono, ME
February 17, 2024; 4:00 p.m., ESPN+		at Vermont	W 57–55	18–8 (11–1)	Patrick Gym; Burlington, VT
February 22, 2024; 7:00 p.m., ESPN+		at UMBC	L 59–67	18–9 (11–2)	Chesapeake Employers Insurance Arena (339); Catonsville, MD
February 24, 2024; 1:00 p.m., ESPN+		at NJIT	W 72–46	19–9 (12–2)	Wellness and Events Center (289); Newark, NJ
February 29, 2024; 6:00 p.m., ESPN+		Binghamton	W 57–51	20–9 (13–2)	Memorial Gymnasium (701); Orono, ME
March 2, 2024; 1:00 p.m., ESPN+		Albany	W 63–46	21–9 (14–2)	Memorial Gymnasium (1,425); Orono, ME
America East women's tournament
March 8, 2024; 5:00 p.m., ESPN+	(1)	(8) UMass Lowell; Quarterfinals	W 49–43	22–9	Memorial Gymnasium (1,320); Orono, ME
March 11, 2024; 6:00 p.m., ESPN+	(1)	(5) Binghamton; Semifinals	W 64–58	23–9	Memorial Gymnasium (1,281); Orono, ME
March 15, 2024; 5:00 p.m., ESPNU	(1)	(3) Vermont; Championship	W 64–48	24–9	Memorial Gymnasium (1,507); Orono, ME
NCAA women's tournament
March 22, 2024*; 12:00 p.m., ESPN	(15 A2)	at (2 A2) No. 7 Ohio State; First round	L 57–80	24–10	Value City Arena; Columbus, OH
*Non-conference game. ^{#}Rankings from AP poll. (#) Tournament seedings in parentheses. A2=Albany 2. All times are in Eastern.
