= 2023–24 UMass Minutewomen basketball team =

American college basketball season

2023–24 UMass Minutewomen basketball
- Conference: Atlantic 10 Conference
- Record: 5–27 (2–16 A–10)
- Head coach: Mike Leflar (1st season)
- Assistant coaches: Yolanda Cole; Clare Fitzpatrick; Samera Marsh
- Home arena: Mullins Center

2023–24 Atlantic 10 women's basketball standings
	Conf.				Overall
Team	W		L	PCT	W		L	PCT
Richmond †	16	–	2	.889	29	–	6	.829
VCU	15	–	3	.833	26	–	6	.813
Saint Joseph's	15	–	3	.833	28	–	6	.824
George Mason	14	–	4	.778	23	–	8	.742
Duquesne	13	–	5	.722	21	–	13	.618
Rhode Island	10	–	8	.556	21	–	14	.600
Saint Louis	9	–	9	.500	22	–	18	.550
Davidson*	8	–	10	.444	18	–	8	.692
Loyola Chicago	8	–	10	.444	15	–	16	.484
Fordham	8	–	10	.444	12	–	17	.414
George Washington	6	–	12	.333	13	–	18	.419
Dayton	5	–	13	.278	12	–	19	.387
La Salle	5	–	13	.278	8	–	22	.267
UMass	2	–	16	.111	5	–	27	.156
St. Bonaventure	1	–	17	.056	4	–	26	.133
† 2024 A10 tournament winner * Season cancelled on March 1, 2024.

The 2023–24 UMass Minutewomen basketball team represented the University of Massachusetts Amherst during the 2023–24 NCAA Division I women's basketball season. The Minutewomen, led by first-year head coach Mike Leflar, played their home games at the Mullins Center in Amherst, Massachusetts as members of the Atlantic 10 Conference.

== Previous season ==
The Minutewomen finished the 2022–23 season 27–7, 14–2 in A–10 play to finish as Atlantic 10 regular season co-champions, alongside Rhode Island. As the #1 seed in the A–10 tournament, they defeated George Mason and Richmond before falling to #3 seed Saint Louis in the championship game. They received an automatic bid into the WNIT, where they would defeat Albany in the first round, before falling to Harvard in the second round.

On April 6, 2023, head coach Tory Verdi announced that he would be leaving the program to take the head coaching position at Pittsburgh. On April 10, associate head coach Mike Leflar was named the team's next head coach.

== Roster ==
2023–24 UMass Minutewomen women's basketball team
Players
Coaches

Pos.	#	Name	Height	Year	Previous school	Hometown
G	0	Alexsia Rose	5 ft 7 in (1.7 m)	Sr	East Carolina	Bloomfield, Connecticut
G	1	Jermany Mapp	6 ft 0 in (1.83 m)	Sr	Hampton	Chester, South Carolina
C	2	Chinenye Odenigbo	6 ft 5 in (1.96 m)	Fr	Noble and Greenough School	Walpole, Massachusetts
G	4	Lilly Ferguson	5 ft 10 in (1.78 m)	So	Newington High School	Newington, Connecticut
G	5	Kristin Williams	5 ft 8 in (1.73 m)	Jr	Pensacola State College	San Diego, California
G	11	Tori Hyduke	5 ft 6 in (1.68 m)	GS	Drexel	Fair Haven, New Jersey
G	14	Dallas Pierce	5 ft 9 in (1.75 m)	Fr	Sanford School	New Castle, Delaware
F	20	Bre Bellamy	6 ft 0 in (1.83 m)	GS	William & Mary	Freehold, New Jersey
F	22	Mikenzie Jones	6 ft 1 in (1.85 m)	So	Denver	Aurora, Colorado
G	24	Allie Palmieri	5 ft 10 in (1.78 m)	Jr	Seton Hall	Trumbull, Connecticut
F/C	33	Lilly Taulelei	6 ft 3 in (1.91 m)	Fr	Queen Margaret College	Wellington, New Zealand
F	34	Avery Childers	5 ft 10 in (1.78 m)	Fr	Robert C. Byrd High School	Clarksburg, West Virginia
G	44	Stefanie Kulesza	6 ft 0 in (1.83 m)	Jr	Conrad Schools of Science	Wilmington, Delaware

Head coach

- Mike Leflar (Boston College)

Assistant coach(es)

- Yolanda Cole (Michigan)
- Clare Fitzpatrick (Cornell)
- Samera Marsh (Saint Peter's)

Legend

- (C) Team captain
- (S) Suspended
- (I) Ineligible
- (W) Walk-on
- Injured
- Current redshirt

Roster
Last update: December 24, 2023

== Schedule and results ==
Date time, TV	Rank^{#}	Opponent^{#}	Result	Record	High points	High rebounds	High assists	Site (attendance) city, state
Exhibition
October 29, 2023*; 2:00 pm		Assumption	W 88–80	–	–	–	–	Mullins Center; Amherst, MA
Non-conference regular season
November 6, 2023*; 6:00 pm, NESN+/ESPN+		Saint Peter's	W 56–44	1–0	19 – Williams	14 – Kulesza	4 – Bellamy	Mullins Center (1,024); Amherst, MA
November 9, 2023*; 7:00 pm, NESN+/FloHoops		at Northeastern	L 74–78	1–1	15 – Bellamy	11 – Kulesza	5 – Williams	Cabot Center (441); Boston, MA
November 12, 2023*; 1:00 pm, ESPN+		at Maine	L 48–69	1–2	15 – Kulesza	6 – Bellamy	2 – 2 Tied	Memorial Gymnasium (993); Orono, ME
November 16, 2023*; 6:00 pm, NESN+/ESPN+		Harvard	L 57–78	1–3	16 – Williams	10 – Kulesza	4 – Hyduke	Mullins Center (984); Amherst, MA
November 19, 2023*; 2:00 pm, FloHoops		at Monmouth	L 62–74	1–4	19 – Kulesza	7 – Bellamy	4 – 2 Tied	OceanFirst Bank Center (601); West Long Branch, NJ
November 23, 2023*; 1:30 pm, FloHoops		vs. Green Bay; Cancún Challenge Mayan Tournament	L 52–85	1–5	11 – Kulesza	7 – Kulesza	7 – Hyduke	Hard Rock Hotel Riviera Maya (200); Cancún, Mexico
November 24, 2023*; 11:00 am, FloHoops		vs. No. 23 Washington State; Cancún Challenge Mayan Tournament	L 48–90	1–6	20 – Kulesza	11 – Kulesza	3 – Ferguson	Hard Rock Hotel Riviera Maya (71); Cancún, Mexico
November 25, 2023*; 11:00 am, FloHoops		vs. Maryland; Cancún Challenge Mayan Tournament	L 63–92	1–7	14 – 2 Tied	6 – 2 Tied	6 – Hyduke	Hard Rock Hotel Riviera Maya (107); Cancún, Mexico
December 1, 2023*; 7:00 pm, ESPN+		at Yale	L 62–70	1–8	13 – Taulelei	5 – 2 Tied	4 – Hyduke	John J. Lee Amphitheater (324); New Haven, CT
December 6, 2023*; 7:00 pm, ACCNX		at Boston College	L 57–95	1–9	14 – Mapp	7 – Kulesza	3 – 2 Tied	Conte Forum (536); Chestnut Hill, MA
December 10, 2023*; 12:00 pm, NESN/ESPN+		UMass Lowell	W 64–52	2–9	19 – Williams	14 – Kulesza	5 – Kulesza	Mullins Center (1,111); Amherst, MA
December 20, 2023*; 12:00 pm, NESN+/ESPN+		Albany	L 52–74	2–10	14 – Williams	9 – Kulesza	3 – 2 Tied	Mullins Center (1,255); Amherst, MA
A-10 regular season
December 30, 2023; 4:30 pm, ESPN+		at VCU	L 45–65	2–11 (0–1)	8 – 2 Tied	6 – Kulesza	3 – Taulelei	Siegel Center (1,014); Richmond, VA
January 2, 2024; 5:00 pm, NESN+/ESPN+		Dayton	W 76–66	3–11 (1–1)	15 – Williams	8 – Kulesza	6 – Bellamy	Mullins Center (752); Amherst, MA
January 6, 2024; 1:00 pm, NESN+/ESPN+		Saint Louis	L 75–79	3–12 (1–2)	18 – 2 Tied	6 – Kulesza	9 – Rose	Mullins Center (955); Amherst, MA
January 10, 2024; 11:00 am, ESPN+		at Richmond	L 65–79	3–13 (1–3)	19 – Williams	8 – Kulesza	4 – Rose	Robins Center (1,904); Richmond, VA
January 13, 2024; 3:00 pm, ESPN+		at La Salle	L 64–70	3–14 (1–4)	14 – Bellamy	10 – Odenigbo	4 – 2 Tied	Tom Gola Arena (1,647); Philadelphia, PA
January 17, 2024; 6:00 pm, NESN/ESPN+		Loyola Chicago	L 66–79	3–15 (1–5)	17 – Kulesza	6 – Kulesza	7 – Rose	Mullins Center (835); Amherst, MA
January 21, 2024; 4:00 pm, CBSSN		George Mason	L 52–73	3–16 (1–6)	20 – Williams	6 – Kulesza	5 – 2 Tied	Mullins Center (1,485); Amherst, MA
January 24, 2024; 7:00 pm, ESPN+		at Davidson	L 42–72	3–17 (1–7)	13 – Williams	6 – Odenigbo	3 – Rose	John M. Belk Arena (713); Davidson, NC
January 27, 2024; 1:00 pm, ESPN+		at Rhode Island	L 48–63	3–18 (1–8)	15 – Kulesza	6 – Kulesza	2 – 2 Tied	Ryan Center (1,674); Kingston, RI
January 31, 2024; 11:00 am, NESN/ESPN+		La Salle	L 61–63	3–19 (1–9)	18 – Rose	6 – 2 Tied	3 – 2 Tied	Mullins Center (3,069); Amherst, MA
February 3, 2024; 2:00 pm, ESPN+		at Saint Joseph's	L 67–77	3–20 (1–10)	22 – Rose	5 – Bellamy	4 – Rose	Hagan Arena (707); Philadelphia, PA
February 7, 2024; 6:00 pm, NESN/ESPN+		Duquesne	L 62–79	3–21 (1–11)	23 – Rose	6 – Kulesza	5 – Rose	Mullins Center (950); Amherst, MA
February 10, 2024; 2:00 pm, SNY/ESPN+		at Fordham	L 50–64	3–22 (1–12)	17 – Williams	5 – Bellamy	2 – 2 Tied	Rose Hill Gymnasium (1,168); Bronx, NY
February 14, 2024; 6:00 pm, NESN/ESPN+		Rhode Island	L 64–86	3–23 (1–13)	15 – Willams	4 – 2 Tied	8 – Rose	Mullins Center (815); Amherst, MA
February 17, 2024; 1:00 pm, NESN+/ESPN+		VCU	L 49–63	3–24 (1–14)	13 – Kulesza	10 – Taulele	3 – 3 Tied	Mullins Center (1,241); Amherst, MA
February 21, 2024; 7:00 pm, NBC Sports App		at Loyola Chicago	L 52–64	3–25 (1–15)	14 – Kulesza	5 – 3 Tied	5 – Hyduke	Joseph J. Gentile Arena (522); Chicago, IL
February 24, 2024; 12:00 pm, ESPN+		at George Washington	L 55–59	3–26 (1–16)	16 – Kulesza	8 – Kulesza	3 – Rose	Charles E. Smith Center (405); Washington, D.C.
February 28, 2024; 6:00 pm, NESN+/ESPN+		St. Bonaventure	W 58–45	4–26 (2–16)	21 – Williams	9 – Kulesza	3 – 2 Tied	Mullins Center (1,220); Amherst, MA
A-10 tournament
March 6, 2024; 12:00 pm, ESPN+	(13)	vs. (12) La Salle; First Round	W 54–49	5–26	14 – Hyduke	13 – Kulesza	2 – 2 Tied	Henrico Sports & Events Center; Henrico, VA
March 7, 2024; 1:30 pm, ESPN+	(13)	vs. (5) Duquesne; Second Round	L 57–81	5–27	11 – 2 Tied	5 – Kulesza	2 – 4 Tied	Henrico Sports & Events Center (2,270); Henrico, VA
*Non-conference game. ^{#}Rankings from AP Poll. (#) Tournament seedings in parentheses. All times are in Eastern.
