= 2023–24 UMass Lowell River Hawks women's basketball team =

American college basketball season

2023–24 UMass Lowell River Hawks women's basketball
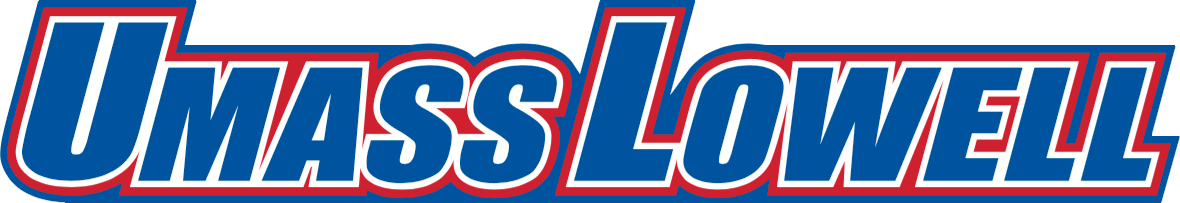
- Conference: America East Conference
- Record: 4–25 (4–12 America East)
- Head coach: Denise King (4th season)
- Assistant coaches: Stefanie Murphy-Thorpe; Jonathan Parsons
- Home arena: Costello Athletic Center

2023–24 America East Conference women's basketball standings
	Conf.				Overall
Team	W		L	PCT	W		L	PCT
Maine †	14	–	2	.875	24	–	10	.706
Albany	13	–	3	.813	25	–	7	.781
Vermont	12	–	4	.750	25	–	12	.676
Bryant	8	–	8	.500	15	–	15	.500
Binghamton	8	–	8	.500	14	–	17	.452
UMBC	6	–	10	.375	10	–	19	.345
NJIT	4	–	12	.250	12	–	18	.400
UMass Lowell	4	–	12	.250	4	–	25	.138
New Hampshire	3	–	13	.188	9	–	20	.310
† 2024 AmEast tournament winner

The 2023–24 UMass Lowell River Hawks women's basketball team represented the University of Massachusetts Lowell during the 2023–24 NCAA Division I women's basketball season. The River Hawks, led by fourth-year head coach Denise King, played their home games at the Costello Athletic Center, with two games being played at the Tsongas Center, both located in Lowell, Massachusetts, as members of the America East Conference.

== Previous season ==
The River Hawks finished the 2022–23 season 5–22, 4–12 in America East play to finish in seventh place. They were defeated by Albany in the quarterfinals of the America East tournament.

== Roster ==
2023–24 UMass Lowell River Hawks women's basketball team
Players
Coaches

Pos.	#	Name	Height	Year	Previous school	Hometown
G	1	Baylee Teal	5 ft 6 in (1.68 m)	Sr	Fordham	Penfield, New York
G	2	Cire Worley	6 ft 0 in (1.83 m)	Fr	Abington Senior High School	Philadelphia, Pennsylvania
G	5	Abbey Lindsey	5 ft 8 in (1.73 m)	Fr	Staten Island Academy	Staten Island, New York
G	9	Tasha Lima	5 ft 7 in (1.7 m)	Jr	Tilton School	Roslindale, Massachusetts
G	10	Sophie Baydanov	5 ft 9 in (1.75 m)	So	Morehead State	Vienna, Austria
G	11	Leilani Rodriguez	5 ft 5 in (1.65 m)	Sr	Worcester Academy	Worcester, Massachusetts
G	12	Maddie Rice	5 ft 8 in (1.73 m)	Fr	St. Anne's-Belfield School	Charlottesville, Virginia
F	13	Rayne Durant	6 ft 1 in (1.85 m)	Fr	Hamden Hall Country Day School	New Haven, Connecticut
G	15	Sydney Watkins	5 ft 8 in (1.73 m)	RS Jr	Miami (OH)	Indianapolis, Indiana
F	20	Sydney Coombs	6 ft 3 in (1.91 m)	Sr	NH Spartans	Newmarket, New Hampshire
G	23	Gabby Ross	5 ft 7 in (1.7 m)	Fr	Donovan Catholic High School	Lakehurst, New Jersey
G	24	Mili Carrera	5 ft 8 in (1.73 m)	GS	USAO	Lima, Peru
G	30	Ella Ner	5 ft 7 in (1.7 m)	So	Ramat Hashrom	Bnei Atarot, Israel
F	55	Alex Gitchenko	5 ft 11 in (1.8 m)	Jr	Georgia State	Ashdod, Israel

Head coach

- Denise King (Rhode Island)

Assistant coach(es)

- Stefanie Murphy-Thorpe (Boston College)
- Jonathan Parsons (Sacred Heart)

Legend

- (C) Team captain
- (S) Suspended
- (I) Ineligible
- (W) Walk-on
- Injured
- Current redshirt

Roster
Last update: December 13, 2023

== Schedule and results ==
Date time, TV	Rank^{#}	Opponent^{#}	Result	Record	Site (attendance) city, state
Non-conference regular season
November 6, 2023*; 6:00 pm, ESPN+		at Boston University	L 58–60	0–1	Case Gym (841); Boston, MA
November 10, 2023*; 6:00 pm, ESPN+		at Rhode Island	L 38–78	0–2	Ryan Center (1,317); Kingston, RI
November 13, 2023*; 7:00 pm, ESPN+		at Holy Cross	L 41–51	0–3	Hart Center (461); Worcester, MA
November 18, 2023*; 1:00 pm, ESPN+		Le Moyne	L 61–63 ^{OT}	0–4	Costello Athletic Center (252); Lowell, MA
November 21, 2023*; 7:00 pm, NEC Front Row		at Central Connecticut	L 49–58	0–5	William H. Detrick Gymnasium (312); New Britain, CT
November 25, 2023*; 1:00 pm, ESPN+		at Fordham	L 49–76	0–6	Rose Hill Gymnasium (134); Bronx, NY
December 3, 2023*; 1:00 pm, ACCNX		at Boston College	L 53–91	0–7	Conte Forum (432); Chestnut Hill, MA
December 5, 2023*; 7:00 pm, ESPN+		at Brown	L 54–74	0–8	Pizzitola Sports Center (138); Providence, RI
December 10, 2023*; 12:00 pm, NESN/ESPN+		at UMass	L 52–64	0–9	Mullins Center (1,111); Amherst, MA
December 14, 2023*; 6:00 pm, ESPN+		Dartmouth	L 52-58	0-10	Costello Athletic Center (316); Lowell, MA
December 22, 2023*; 1:00 pm, ESPN+		Harvard	L 41-62	0-11	Costello Athletic Center (348); Lowell, MA
December 29, 2023*; 2:00 pm, ESPN+		Colgate	L 45-65	0-12	Costello Athletic Center (177); Lowell, MA
America East regular season
January 4, 2024; 6:00 pm, ESPN+		Maine	L 43-55	0-13 (0-1)	Costello Athletic Center (202); Lowell, MA
January 6, 2024; 2:00 pm, ESPN+		New Hampshire	W 70-53	1-13 (1-1)	Costello Athletic Center (275); Lowell, MA
January 11, 2024; 11:00 am, ESPN+		at NJIT	W 70-67	2-13 (2-1)	Wellness and Events Center (1,718); Newark, NJ
January 13, 2024; 1:00 pm, ESPN+		at UMBC	W 59-46	3-13 (3-1)	Chesapeake Employers Insurance Arena (177); Catonsville, MD
January 18, 2024; 11:00 am, ESPN+		Albany	L 49-65	3-14 (3-2)	Tsongas Center (3,621); Lowell, MA
January 20, 2024; 2:00 pm, ESPN+		Binghamton	L 65-70	3-15 (3-3)	Costello Athletic Center (269); Lowell, MA
January 25, 2024; 11:00 am, ESPN+		at Vermont	L 53-62	3-16 (3-4)	Patrick Gym (2,555); Burlington, VT
February 1, 2024; 6:00 pm, ESPN+		at Maine	L 49-68	3-17 (3-5)	The Pit at Memorial Gymnasium (1,072); Orono, ME
February 3, 2024; 3:00 pm, ESPN+		at New Hampshire	L 52-66	3-18 (3-6)	Lundholm Gym (558); Durham, NH
February 8, 2024; 6:00 pm, ESPN+		UMBC	W 71-60	4-18 (4-6)	Costello Athletic Center (300); Lowell, MA
February 10, 2024; 1:00 pm, ESPN+		NJIT	L 56-68	4-19 (4-7)	Costello Athletic Center (420); Lowell, MA
February 17, 2024; 2:00 pm, ESPN+		Bryant	L 43-62	4-20 (4-8)	Costello Athletic Center (307); Lowell, MA
February 22, 2024; 6:00 pm, ESPN+		at Binghamton	L 48-79	4-21 (4-9)	Binghamton University Events Center (1,342); Vestal, NY
February 24, 2024; 2:00 pm, ESPN+		at Albany	L 39-59	4-22 (4-10)	Broadview Center (1,395); Albany, NY
February 29, 2024; 6:00 pm, ESPN+		at Bryant	L 51-60	4-23 (4-11)	Chace Athletic Center (226); Smithfield, RI
March 2, 2024; 3:00 pm, ESPN+		Vermont	L 51-55	4-24 (4-12)	Tsongas Center (569); Lowell, MA
America East Women's Tournament
March 8, 2024; 5:00 p.m., ESPN+	(8)	at (1) Maine; Quarterfinals	L 43-49	4-25	Memorial Gymnasium (1,320); Orono, ME
*Non-conference game. ^{#}Rankings from AP Poll. (#) Tournament seedings in parentheses. All times are in Eastern.
