= Cornville =

Cornville may refer to a place in the United States:

- Cornville, Arizona
- Cornville, Maine
