= 2023–24 NJIT Highlanders women's basketball team =

American college basketball season

2023–24 NJIT Highlanders women's basketball
- Conference: America East Conference
- Record: 12–18 (4–12 America East)
- Head coach: Mike Lane (6th season)
- Assistant coaches: Aaron Gratch; Colleen Moriarty; Payce Lange; Camryn Johnson
- Home arena: Wellness and Events Center

2023–24 America East Conference women's basketball standings
| | Conf. | | | | Overall |
| Team | W | | L | PCT | W | | L | PCT |
|---|---|---|---|---|---|---|---|---|
| Maine † | 14 | – | 2 | .875 | 24 | – | 10 | .706 |
| Albany | 13 | – | 3 | .813 | 25 | – | 7 | .781 |
| Vermont | 12 | – | 4 | .750 | 25 | – | 12 | .676 |
| Bryant | 8 | – | 8 | .500 | 15 | – | 15 | .500 |
| Binghamton | 8 | – | 8 | .500 | 14 | – | 17 | .452 |
| UMBC | 6 | – | 10 | .375 | 10 | – | 19 | .345 |
| NJIT | 4 | – | 12 | .250 | 12 | – | 18 | .400 |
| UMass Lowell | 4 | – | 12 | .250 | 4 | – | 25 | .138 |
| New Hampshire | 3 | – | 13 | .188 | 9 | – | 20 | .310 |
† 2024 AmEast tournament winner

The 2023–24 NJIT Highlanders women's basketball team represented the New Jersey Institute of Technology during the 2023–24 NCAA Division I women's basketball season. The Highlanders, led by sixth-year head coach Mike Lane, played their home games at the Wellness and Events Center in Newark, New Jersey as members of the America East Conference.

The Highlanders finished the season 12–18, 4–12 in America East play, to finish in a tie for seventh place. They were defeated by Albany in the quarterfinals of the America East tournament.

== Previous season ==
The Highlanders finished the 2022–23 season 13–16, 8–8 in America East play, to finish in fifth place. They were defeated by UMBC in the quarterfinals of the America East tournament.

== Roster ==
2023–24 NJIT Highlanders women's basketball team
Players
Coaches

| Pos. | # | Name | Height | Year | Previous school | Hometown |
|---|---|---|---|---|---|---|
| F/C | 2 | Lindsey Syrek | 6 ft 2 in (1.88 m) | Sr | University HS | Carmel, IN |
| G | 4 | Kenna Squier | 5 ft 9 in (1.75 m) | GS | Pope John XXIII HS | Branchville, NJ |
| F | 5 | Audrey Kormann | 6 ft 2 in (1.88 m) | Fr | Maple Grove Senior HS | Maple Grove, MN |
| G | 10 | Marissa Gingrich | 5 ft 7 in (1.7 m) | Fr | Mifflin County HS | Mifflin County, PA |
| G | 11 | Aria Myers | 5 ft 9 in (1.75 m) | Sr | Paramus Catholic HS | Cedar Grove, NJ |
| F | 13 | Kiana Brereton | 6 ft 1 in (1.85 m) | Sr | Summit Academy Charter School | Brooklyn, NY |
| G | 14 | Lyzi Litwinko | 5 ft 8 in (1.73 m) | Sr | Berlin HS | Berlin, CT |
| G | 15 | Madilyn Dogs | 6 ft 0 in (1.83 m) | Fr | Kewaskum HS | Kewaskum, WI |
| F | 21 | Trinity Williams | 6 ft 1 in (1.85 m) | Jr | Palisades HS | Upper Black Eddy, PA |
| G | 22 | Reese Vaughan | 5 ft 9 in (1.75 m) | Jr | Seton Catholic Central HS | Endwell, NY |
| F | 23 | Mackenzie Wright-Rawls | 6 ft 0 in (1.83 m) | Fr | Central York HS | York, PA |
| F | 24 | Kyleigh Welsh | 6 ft 2 in (1.88 m) | RS Fr | Clearwater HS | Clearwater, FL |
| G | 25 | Avery O'Roke | 5 ft 7 in (1.7 m) | So | Millbrook HS | Winchester, VA |
| F | 32 | Lilly Anderson | 5 ft 11 in (1.8 m) | Sr | Cuthbertson HS | Waxhaw, NC |
| G | 34 | Alejandra Zuniga | 5 ft 6 in (1.68 m) | So | IES Jose Garcia Nieto | Madrid, Spain |
| F | 55 | Angelina Banas | 6 ft 0 in (1.83 m) | Fr | Notre Dame HS | Columbus, NJ |

Head coach

- Mike Lane (Notre Dame)

Assistant coach(es)

- Aaron Gratch (Caldwell)
- Colleen Moriarty (UMass Dartmouth)
- Payce Lange (Kean)
- Camryn Johnson (Francis Marion)

Legend

- (C) Team captain
- (S) Suspended
- (I) Ineligible
- (W) Walk-on
- Injured
- Current redshirt

Roster
Last update: December 11, 2023

== Schedule and results ==
| Date time, TV | Rank^{#} | Opponent^{#} | Result | Record | Site (attendance) city, state |
Non-conference regular season
| November 6, 2023*; 5:00 p.m., ESPN+ | | at Army | W 73–57 | 1–0 | Christl Arena (400); West Point, NY |
| November 10, 2023*; 7:00 p.m., ESPN+ | | Merrimack | W 48–45 ^{OT} | 2–0 | Wellness and Events Center (345); Newark, NJ |
| November 12, 2023*; 2:00 p.m., ESPN+ | | No. 10 Notre Dame | L 57–104 | 2–1 | Wellness and Events Center (1,631); Newark, NJ |
| November 15, 2023*; 7:00 p.m., ESPN+ | | Rider | W 70–57 | 3–1 | Wellness and Events Center (240); Newark, NJ |
| November 18, 2023*; 1:00 p.m., ESPN+ | | Wagner | W 80–36 | 4–1 | Wellness and Events Center (272); Newark, NJ |
| November 21, 2023*; 6:00 p.m., ESPN+ | | at Lafayette | L 60–83 | 4–2 | Kirby Sports Center (209); Easton, PA |
| November 25, 2023*; 2:00 p.m., FloHoops | | at Hofstra | L 65–67 | 4–3 | Mack Sports Complex (369); Hempstead, NY |
| November 29, 2023*; 7:00 p.m., NEC Front Row | | at Fairleigh Dickinson | W 61–46 | 5–3 | Rothman Center (187); Hackensack, NJ |
| December 3, 2023*; 12:00 p.m., ACCN | | at Miami (FL) | L 43–87 | 5–4 | Watsco Center (2,629); Coral Gables, FL |
| December 6, 2023*; 7:00 p.m., NEC Front Row | | at Sacred Heart | L 48–57 | 5–5 | William H. Pitt Center (402); Fairfield, CT |
| December 12, 2023*; 7:00 p.m., ESPN+ | | Saint Peter's | W 66–47 | 6–5 | Wellness and Events Center (250); Newark, NJ |
| December 15, 2023*; 6:00 p.m., ESPN+ | | Saint Francis | W 68–41 | 7–5 | Wellness and Events Center (196); Newark, NJ |
| December 31, 2023*; 1:00 p.m., ESPN+ | | LIU | W 58–54 | 8–5 | Wellness and Events Center (250); Newark, NJ |
America East regular season
| January 6, 2024; 2:00 p.m., ESPN+ | | at Albany | L 36–77 | 8–6 (0–1) | Broadview Center (1,036); Albany, NY |
| January 11, 2024; 11:00 a.m., ESPN+ | | UMass Lowell | L 67–70 | 8–7 (0–2) | Wellness and Events Center (1,718); Newark, NJ |
| January 13, 2024; 1:00 p.m., ESPN+ | | Vermont | L 55–68 | 8–8 (0–3) | Wellness and Events Center (302); Newark, NJ |
| January 18, 2024; 6:00 p.m., ESPN+ | | at New Hampshire | L 50–56 | 8–9 (0–4) | Lundholm Gym (166); Durham, NH |
| January 20, 2024; 1:00 p.m., ESPN+ | | at Maine | L 39–81 | 8–10 (0–5) | The Pit at Memorial Gymnasium (1,237); Orono, ME |
| January 25, 2024; 6:00 p.m., ESPN+ | | at Bryant | L 64–73 | 8–11 (0–6) | Chace Athletic Center (278); Smithfield, RI |
| January 27, 2024; 3:00 p.m., ESPN+ | | UMBC | L 61–72 | 8–12 (0–7) | Wellness and Events Center (325); Newark, NJ |
| February 1, 2024; 7:00 p.m., ESPN+ | | Binghamton | L 58–63 | 8–13 (0–8) | Wellness and Events Center (301); Newark, NJ |
| February 8, 2024; 6:00 p.m., ESPN+ | | at Vermont | L 51–76 | 8–14 (0–9) | Patrick Gym (662); Burlington, VT |
| February 10, 2024; 1:00 p.m., ESPN+ | | at UMass Lowell | W 68–56 | 9–14 (1–9) | Costello Athletic Center (420); Lowell, MA |
| February 15, 2024; 7:00 p.m., ESPN+ | | Albany | L 36–38 | 9–15 (1–10) | Wellness and Events Center (334); Newark, NJ |
| February 17, 2024; 2:00 p.m., ESPN+ | | at Binghamton | L 48–68 | 9–16 (1–11) | Binghamton University Events Center (1,417); Vestal, NY |
| February 22, 2024; 7:00 p.m., ESPN+ | | New Hampshire | W 64–52 | 10–16 (2–11) | Wellness and Events Center (255); Newark, NJ |
| February 24, 2024; 1:00 p.m., ESPN+ | | Maine | L 46–72 | 10–17 (2–12) | Wellness and Events Center (289); Newark, NJ |
| February 29, 2024; 7:00 p.m., ESPN+ | | at UMBC | W 77–76 ^{OT} | 11–17 (3–12) | Chesapeake Employers Insurance Arena (347); Catonsville, MD |
| March 2, 2024; 2:00 p.m., ESPN+ | | Bryant | W 64–38 | 12–17 (4–12) | Wellness and Events Center (606); Newark, NJ |
America East women's tournament
| March 8, 2024; 7:00 p.m., ESPN+ | (7) | at (3) Albany; Quarterfinals | L 42–57 | 12–18 | Broadview Center (968); Albany, NY |
*Non-conference game. ^{#}Rankings from AP poll. (#) Tournament seedings in parentheses. All times are in Eastern.
