= 2023–24 James Madison Dukes women's basketball team =

Intercollegiate basketball season

2023–24 James Madison Dukes women's basketball

WBIT, first round
- Conference: Sun Belt Conference
- Record: 23–12 (13–5 Sun Belt)
- Head coach: Sean O'Regan (8th season)
- Assistant coaches: Neil Harrow; Lexie Barrier; Kayla Cooper-Williams
- Home arena: Atlantic Union Bank Center

2023–24 Sun Belt Conference women's basketball standings
	Conf.				Overall
Team	W		L	PCT	W		L	PCT
Marshall †	17	–	1	.944	26	–	7	.788
Troy	15	–	3	.833	22	–	12	.647
James Madison	13	–	5	.722	23	–	12	.657
Old Dominion	12	–	6	.667	22	–	10	.688
Louisiana–Monroe	10	–	8	.556	21	–	14	.600
Southern Miss	10	–	8	.556	20	–	14	.588
Louisiana	10	–	8	.556	17	–	14	.548
Appalachian State	9	–	9	.500	17	–	15	.531
Georgia State	9	–	9	.500	15	–	15	.500
Arkansas State	6	–	12	.333	13	–	17	.433
Coastal Carolina	5	–	13	.278	12	–	21	.364
Georgia Southern	4	–	14	.222	15	–	18	.455
Texas State	4	–	14	.222	14	–	18	.438
South Alabama	2	–	16	.111	9	–	23	.281
† 2024 Sun Belt tournament winner

The 2023–24 James Madison Dukes women's basketball team represented James Madison University during the 2023–24 NCAA Division I women's basketball season. The Dukes, led by eighth-year head coach Sean O'Regan, played their home games at the Atlantic Union Bank Center as second-year members of the Sun Belt Conference.

== Previous season ==
The Dukes finished the 2022–23 with a record of 26–7 overall and 13–5 in conference play. They won the conference tournament championship by defeating Texas State 81–51. They advanced to the NCAA tournament and lost to Ohio State in the first round.

== Roster ==
2023–24 James Madison Dukes women's basketball team
Players
Coaches

Pos.	#	Name	Height	Year	Previous school	Hometown
G	0	Peyton McDaniel	6 ft 0 in (1.83 m)	RS So	Twin Valley HS	Birdsboro, PA
G	1	Olivia Mullins	5 ft 8 in (1.73 m)	RS Jr	Rutgers Preparatory School; Saint Joseph's	Somerset, NJ
G	2	Chloe Sterling	5 ft 7 in (1.7 m)	So	Marietta HS	Kennesaw, GA
G	3	Hevynne Bristow	6 ft 1 in (1.85 m)	Sr	Brooklyn Community of Arts and Media; Providence; Ohio State	Brooklyn, NY
G	4	Amira Williams	5 ft 11 in (1.8 m)	RS Jr	Winston-Salem Christian; College of Charleston	Winston-Salem, NC
F	5	Ashanti Barnes	6 ft 2 in (1.88 m)	Jr	Lake Taylor HS; Trinity Valley CC	Norfolk, VA
G	11	Carole Miller	6 ft 0 in (1.83 m)	GS	Edison HS; Virginia	Alexandria, VA
F	14	Annalicia Goodman	6 ft 4 in (1.93 m)	RS Jr	Heritage HS	Newport News, VA
G	15	Jada Mills	5 ft 9 in (1.75 m)	Fr	Putnam Science Academy	Norwich, CT
F	23	Mikaya Tynes	6 ft 1 in (1.85 m)	Jr	Norview HS	Norfolk, VA
G	25	Jamia Hazell	5 ft 8 in (1.73 m)	RS Jr	Southeast Raleigh HS	Raleigh, NC
G	31	Atiana Williams	5 ft 7 in (1.7 m)	Fr	Menchville HS	Newport News, VA
F	33	Steph Ouderkirk	6 ft 1 in (1.85 m)	RS Jr	Spotswood HS	Penn Laird, VA
C	35	Kseniia Kozlova	6 ft 4 in (1.93 m)	RS Jr	Montverde; Middle Tennessee	Moscow, Russia

Head coach

- Sean O'Regan (James Madison)

Assistant coach(es)

- Neil Harrow (Valdosta State)
- Lexie Barrier (NC State)
- Kayla Cooper-Williams (James Madison)

Legend

- (C) Team captain
- (S) Suspended
- (I) Ineligible
- (W) Walk-on
- Injured
- Current redshirt

Roster
Last update: July 24, 2024

== Schedule and results ==
Date time, TV	Rank^{#}	Opponent^{#}	Result	Record	High points	High rebounds	High assists	Site (attendance) city, state
Non-conference regular season
November 6, 2023*; 7:00p.m., ESPN+		Eastern Mennonite	W 104–31	1–0	17 – Hazell	10 – Barnes	5 – Mullins	Atlantic Union Bank Center (2,517); Harrisonburg, VA
November 8, 2023*; 7:00 p.m., ESPN+		Toledo; MAC–SBC Challenge	L 49–60	1–1	13 – Kozlova	13 – Kozlova	3 – Mullins	Atlantic Union Bank Center (2,381); Harrisonburg, VA
November 11, 2023*; 7:00 p.m., FloHoops		at Xavier	W 81–54	2–1	22 – McDaniel	13 – McDaniel	4 – Mullins	Cintas Center (550); Cincinnati, OH
November 15, 2023*; 7:00 p.m., ESPN+		Longwood	W 84–50	3–1	14 – Miller	10 – McDaniel	6 – Sterling	Atlantic Union Bank Center (2,185); Harrisonburg, VA
November 19, 2023*; 2:00 p.m., ESPN+		VCU	W 78–65	4–1	19 – McDaniel	8 – Goodman	5 – Ouderkirk	Atlantic Union Bank Center (3,089); Harrisonburg, VA
November 23, 2023*; 6:30 p.m., FloHoops		vs. Michigan State; Cancún Challenge	L 69–95	4–2	19 – Hazell	8 – Hazell	3 – tied	Hard Rock Hotel Riviera Maya (197); Cancún, Mexico
November 24, 2023*; 9:00 p.m., FloHoops		vs. Montana State; Cancún Challenge	W 65–62	5–2	16 – Hazell	11 – McDaniel	4 – Ouderkirk	Hard Rock Hotel Riviera Maya (200); Cancún, Mexico
December 1, 2023*; 12:00 p.m., ESPN+		at Liberty	L 53–67	5–3	12 – Barnes	7 – McDaniel	4 – Ouderkirk	Liberty Arena (755); Lynchburg, Virginia
December 3, 2023*; 4:00 p.m., ESPN+		Wake Forest	W 55–53	6–3	14 – Ouderkirk	9 – Ouderkirk	3 – Kozlova	Atlantic Union Bank Center (2,446); Harrisonburg, VA
December 7, 2023*; 7:00 p.m., ESPN+		William & Mary	W 75–56	7–3	20 – Kozlova	10 – McDaniel	4 – Hazell	Atlantic Union Bank Center (2,441); Harrisonburg, VA
December 17, 2023*; 1:00 p.m., ESPN+		at Maine	W 78–71	8–3	20 – Kozlova	12 – McDaniel	8 – Ouderkirk	The Pit (984); Orono, ME
December 20, 2023*; 2:00 p.m., BTN+		at Maryland	L 55–78	8–4	25 – McDaniel	8 – McDaniel	4 – Ouderkirk	Xfinity Center (5,032); College Park, MD
Sun Belt regular season
December 30, 2023; 3:00 p.m., ESPN+		at Louisiana–Monroe	W 85–79	9–4 (1–0)	25 – Hazell	9 – Ouderkirk	4 – Sterling	Fant–Ewing Coliseum (550); Monroe, LA
January 4, 2024; 7:00 p.m., ESPN+		Arkansas State	W 64–57	10–4 (2–0)	17 – Barnes	15 – Kozlova	4 – Hazell	Atlantic Union Bank Center (2,182); Harrisonburg, VA
January 6, 2024; 1:00 p.m., ESPN+		Louisiana	W 77–72 ^{OT}	11–4 (3–0)	20 – Kozlova	9 – Kozlova	5 – Hazell	Atlantic Union Bank Center (2,268); Harrisonburg, VA
January 11, 2024; 7:00 p.m., ESPN+		at Southern Miss	W 81–76	12–4 (4–0)	33 – McDaniel	9 – Bristow	5 – Mullins	Reed Green Coliseum (1,368); Hattiesburg, MS
January 13, 2024; 3:00 p.m., ESPN+		at Troy	L 74–87	12–5 (4–1)	19 – Kozlova	11 – Kozlova	4 – tied	Trojan Arena (3,333); Troy, AL
January 18, 2024; 5:00 p.m., ESPN+		Georgia Southern	W 72–51	13–5 (5–1)	24 – McDaniel	9 – Kozlova	3 – tied	Atlantic Union Bank Center (2,160); Harrisonburg, VA
January 20, 2024; 2:00 p.m., ESPN+		Old Dominion; Royal Rivalry	W 72–64	14–5 (6–1)	20 – Bristow	10 – Barnes	3 – Hazell	Atlantic Union Bank Center (2,611); Harrisonburg, VA
January 24, 2024; 7:00 p.m., ESPN+		Marshall	L 70–77	14–6 (6–2)	11 – Bristow	11 – Barnes	4 – Hazell	Atlantic Union Bank Center (2,370); Harrisonburg, VA
January 27, 2024; 4:00 p.m., ESPN+		Appalachian State	W 78–61	15–6 (7–2)	22 – McDaniel	14 – Kozlova	4 – Ouderkirk	Atlantic Union Bank Center (4,080); Harrisonburg, VA
January 31, 2024; 6:30 p.m., ESPN+		at Georgia State	L 72–82	15–7 (7–3)	19 – McDaniel	8 – McDaniel	6 – Hazell	Georgia State Convocation Center (749); Atlanta, GA
February 3, 2024; 1:00 p.m., ESPN+		at Marshall	W 72–63	16–7 (8–3)	12 – Bristow	8 – Bristow	5 – Hazell	Cam Henderson Center (2,526); Huntington, WV
February 7, 2024; 7:00 p.m., ESPN+		South Alabama	W 82–66	17–7 (9–3)	22 – McDaniel	11 – Kozlova	6 – Sterling	Atlantic Union Bank Center (3,087); Harrisonburg, VA
February 11, 2024*; 2:00 p.m., CBSSN		at Ball State; MAC–SBC Challenge	L 57–72	17–8	13 – Barnes	8 – Kozlova	1 – tied	Worthen Arena (1,575); Muncie, IN
February 15, 2024; 5:00 p.m., ESPN+		Georgia State	L 62–73	17–9 (9–4)	21 – McDaniel	7 – Barnes	4 – Hazell	Atlantic Union Bank Center (2,191); Harrisonburg, VA
February 17, 2024; 2:00 p.m., ESPN+		Coastal Carolina	W 73–60	18–9 (10–4)	22 – McDaniel	13 – McDaniel	7 – Ouderkirk	Atlantic Union Bank Center (2,622); Harrisonburg, VA
February 22, 2024; 5:00 p.m., ESPN+		at Georgia Southern	W 71–65	19–9 (11–4)	16 – McDaniel	9 – Miller	3 – Mullins	Hanner Fieldhouse (659); Statesboro, GA
February 24, 2024; 2:00 p.m., ESPN+		at Appalachian State	L 79–83	19–10 (11–5)	19 – Hazell	10 – Barnes	2 – McDaniel	Holmes Center (600); Boone, NC
February 28, 2024; 5:00 p.m., ESPN+		at Coastal Carolina	W 69–60	20–10 (12–5)	17 – Goodman	10 – McDaniel	2 – Sterling	HTC Center (551); Conway, SC
March 1, 2024; 6:30 p.m., ESPN+		at Old Dominion; Royal Rivalry	W 70–58	21–10 (13–5)	21 – McDaniel	11 – Barnes	3 – Mullins	Chartway Arena (4,342); Norfolk, VA
Sun Belt tournament
March 8, 2024; 6:00 p.m., ESPN+	(3)	vs. (6) Southern Miss; Quarterfinals	W 77–49	22–10	21 – McDaniel	11 – McDaniel	4 – Sterling	Pensacola Bay Center (842); Pensacola, FL
March 10, 2024; 3:00 p.m., ESPN+	(3)	vs. (7) Louisiana; Semifinals	W 64–54	23–10	13 – McDaniel	14 – Barnes	5 – Sterling	Pensacola Bay Center (946); Pensacola, FL
March 11, 2024; 2:00 p.m., ESPNU	(3)	vs. (1) Marshall; Championship	L 92–95 ^{OT}	23–11	20 – McDaniel	12 – Bristow	5 – Sterling	Pensacola Bay Center (785); Pensacola, FL
WBIT
March 21, 2024*; 7:00 p.m., ESPN+	(1)	Stony Brook; First round	L 70–81	23–12	24 – McDaniel	13 – Barnes	4 – tied	Atlantic Union Bank Center (922); Harrisonburg, VA
*Non-conference game. ^{#}Rankings from AP poll. (#) Tournament seedings in parentheses. All times are in Eastern.

== See also ==
- 2023–24 James Madison Dukes men's basketball team
