= 2023–24 Albany Great Danes women's basketball team =

American college basketball season

2023–24 Albany Great Danes women's basketball

WNIT, first round
- Conference: America East Conference
- Record: 25–7 (13–3 America East)
- Head coach: Colleen Mullen (6th season)
- Associate head coach: Megan Methven
- Assistant coaches: Catherine Cassidy; Yvonne Hawkins
- Home arena: Broadview Center

2023–24 America East Conference women's basketball standings
	Conf.				Overall
Team	W		L	PCT	W		L	PCT
Maine †	14	–	2	.875	24	–	10	.706
Albany	13	–	3	.813	25	–	7	.781
Vermont	12	–	4	.750	25	–	12	.676
Bryant	8	–	8	.500	15	–	15	.500
Binghamton	8	–	8	.500	14	–	17	.452
UMBC	6	–	10	.375	10	–	19	.345
NJIT	4	–	12	.250	12	–	18	.400
UMass Lowell	4	–	12	.250	4	–	25	.138
New Hampshire	3	–	13	.188	9	–	20	.310
† 2024 AmEast tournament winner

The 2023–24 Albany Great Danes women's basketball team represented the University at Albany, SUNY during the 2023–24 NCAA Division I women's basketball season. The Great Danes, led by sixth-year head coach Colleen Mullen, played their home games at the Broadview Center located in Albany, NY as members of the America East Conference.

== Previous season ==
The Great Danes finished the 2022–23 season 22–12, 14–2 in America East play, to finish as America East co-regular-season champions, alongside Vermont. They defeated UMass Lowell in the quarterfinals and Maine in the semifinals, before falling to Vermont in the championship game of the America East tournament. They received an automatic bid to the WNIT, where they lost in the first round to UMass.

== Roster ==
2023–24 Albany Great Danes women's basketball team
Players
Coaches

Pos.	#	Name	Height	Year	Previous school	Hometown
G	1	Fatima Lee	5 ft 7 in (1.7 m)	GS	Providence	Queens, NY
G	3	Lilly Phillips	5 ft 11 in (1.8 m)	Jr	Cambridge Central School	Greenwich, NY
G	10	Selina Monestime	5 ft 11 in (1.8 m)	Fr	Framingham High School	Framingham, MA
G	13	Sarah Karpell	5 ft 7 in (1.7 m)	GS	Fordham	Holmdel, NJ
F	14	Helene Haegerstrand	6 ft 1 in (1.85 m)	GS	Morbyskolan	Stockholm, Sweden
G/F	15	Hailee Ford	5 ft 11 in (1.8 m)	Fr	Concordia Preparatory School	Perry Hall, MD
G	20	Kayla Cooper	6 ft 0 in (1.83 m)	Sr	Saint John's Catholic Prep	Frederick, MD
C	21	Gabriela Falcão	6 ft 1 in (1.85 m)	So	La Salle	Figueira da Foz, Portugal
F	22	Deja Evans	6 ft 2 in (1.88 m)	Fr	Archbishop Wood High School	Conshohocken, PA
G	23	Meghan Huerter	5 ft 11 in (1.8 m)	Jr	Providence	Clifton Park, NY
G	24	Abby Ray	5 ft 8 in (1.73 m)	Jr	Saratoga Springs High School	Saratoga Springs, NY
G	33	Marie Sepp	5 ft 5 in (1.65 m)	So	Audentese Spordigümnaasium	Tallinn, Estonia

Head coach

- Colleen Mullen (New Hampshire)

Assistant coach(es)

- Megan Methven (Stonehill)
- Catherine Cassidy (Plattsburgh State)
- Yvonne Hawkins (Ashland)

Legend

- (C) Team captain
- (S) Suspended
- (I) Ineligible
- (W) Walk-on
- Injured
- Current redshirt

Roster
Last update: December 11, 2023

== Schedule and results ==
Date time, TV	Rank^{#}	Opponent^{#}	Result	Record	Site (attendance) city, state
Non-conference regular season
November 6, 2023*; 7:00 p.m.		at Merrimack	W 58–55	1–0	Hammel Court; North Andover, MA
November 10, 2023*; 7:00 p.m., ESPN+		at Fordham	L 63–66	1–1	Rose Hill Gymnasium (347); The Bronx, NY
November 14, 2023*; 7:00 p.m.		Sarah Lawrence	W 118–27	2–1	Daniel P. Nolan Gymnasium (513); Albany, NY
November 16, 2023*; 7:00 p.m., ESPN+		at St. Bonaventure	W 66–56	3–1	Reilly Center (130); St. Bonaventure, NY
November 22, 2023*; 2:00 p.m., ESPN+		at Cornell	W 57–45	4–1	Newman Arena (278); Ithaca, NY
November 26, 2023*; 4:00 p.m., P12N		at No. 4 Stanford	L 35–79	4–2	Maples Pavilion (2,754); Stanford, CA
December 2, 2023*; 5:00 p.m., ESPN+		Siena; Albany Cup	W 76–58	5–2	Broadview Center (1,626); Albany, NY
December 6, 2023*; 7:00 p.m., NEC Front Row		at Central Connecticut	W 56–37	6–2	William H. Detrick Gymnasium (307); New Britain, CT
December 9, 2023*; 2:00 p.m., ESPN+		Marist	W 49–39	7–2	Broadview Center (858); Albany, NY
December 12, 2023*; 7:00 p.m., ESPN+		Dartmouth	W 68–57	8–2	Broadview Center (792); Albany, NY
December 16, 2023*; 2:00 p.m., ESPN+		Stonehill	W 77–38	9–2	Broadview Center (790); Albany, NY
December 20, 2023*; 12:00 p.m., NESN+/ESPN+		at UMass	W 74–52	10–2	Mullins Center (1,255); Amherst, MA
December 30, 2023*; 2:00 p.m., ESPN+		Navy	W 87–56	11–2	Broadview Center (1,328); Albany, NY
America East regular season
January 4, 2024; 7:00 p.m., ESPN+		Bryant	W 69–50	12–2 (1–0)	Broadview Center (875); Albany, NY
January 6, 2024; 2:00 p.m., ESPN+		NJIT	W 77–36	13–2 (2–0)	Broadview Center (1,036); Albany, NY
January 13, 2024; 2:00 p.m., ESPN+		at Binghamton	W 60–58	14–2 (3–0)	Binghamton University Events Center (976); Vestal, NY
January 18, 2024; 11:00 a.m., ESPN+		at UMass Lowell	W 65–49	15–2 (4–0)	Tsongas Center (3,621); Lowell, MA
January 20, 2024; 2:00 p.m., ESPN+		at Bryant	W 64–62	16–2 (5–0)	Chace Athletic Center (265); Smithfield, RI
January 25, 2024; 7:00 p.m., ESPN+		Maine	W 54–47	17–2 (6–0)	Broadview Center (1,222); Albany, NY
January 27, 2024; 2:00 p.m., ESPN+		New Hampshire	W 54–46	18–2 (7–0)	Broadview Center (1,349); Albany, NY
February 1, 2024; 7:00 p.m., ESPN+		Vermont	L 59–64	18–3 (7–1)	Broadview Center (1,119); Albany, NY
February 3, 2024; 1:00 p.m., ESPN+		at UMBC	W 69–55	19–3 (8–1)	Chesapeake Employers Insurance Arena (339); Catonsville, MD
February 8, 2024; 11:00 a.m., ESPN+		Binghamton	W 60–52	20–3 (9–1)	Broadview Center (3,701); Albany, NY
February 15, 2024; 7:00 p.m., ESPN+		at NJIT	W 38–36	21–3 (10–1)	Wellness and Events Center (334); Newark, NJ
February 17, 2024; 7:00 p.m., ESPN+		UMBC	W 58–56	22–3 (11–1)	Broadview Center (1,111); Albany, NY
February 22, 2024; 6:00 p.m., ESPN+		at Vermont	L 35–67	22–4 (11–2)	Patrick Gym (945); Burlington, VT
February 24, 2024; 2:00 p.m., ESPN+		UMass Lowell	W 59–39	23–4 (12–2)	Broadview Center (1,395); Albany, NY
February 29, 2024; 6:00 p.m., ESPN+		at New Hampshire	W 45–40	24–4 (13–2)	Lundholm Gym (244); Durham, NH
March 2, 2024; 1:00 p.m., ESPN+		at Maine	L 46–63	24–5 (13–3)	Memorial Gymnasium (1,425); Orono, ME
America East women's tournament
March 8, 2024; 7:00 p.m., ESPN+	(2)	(7) NJIT; Quarterfinals	W 57–42	25–5	Broadview Center (968); Albany, NY
March 11, 2024; 7:00 p.m., ESPN+	(2)	(3) Vermont; Semifinals	L 46–50	25–6	Broadview Center (958); Albany, NY
WNIT
March 21, 2024*; 6:00 p.m., ESPN+		at Colgate; Round 1	L 50–64	25–7	Cotterell Court (273); Hamilton, NY
*Non-conference game. ^{#}Rankings from AP poll. (#) Tournament seedings in parentheses. All times are in Eastern.

== See also ==
- 2023–24 Albany Great Danes men's basketball team
