= 2024 America East women's basketball tournament =

American college basketball postseason tournament

- Classification: Division I
- Season: 2023–24
- Teams: 8
- Site: Campus sites
- Finals site: Memorial Gymnasium (University of Maine); Orono, ME
- Champions: Maine (10th title)
- Winning coach: Amy Vachon (3rd title)
- MVP: Anne Simon (Maine)
- Television: ESPN+, ESPNU
- America East women's basketball tournaments

2023–24 America East Conference women's basketball standings
	Conf.				Overall
Team	W		L	PCT	W		L	PCT
Maine †	14	–	2	.875	24	–	10	.706
Albany	13	–	3	.813	25	–	7	.781
Vermont	12	–	4	.750	25	–	12	.676
Bryant	8	–	8	.500	15	–	15	.500
Binghamton	8	–	8	.500	14	–	17	.452
UMBC	6	–	10	.375	10	–	19	.345
NJIT	4	–	12	.250	12	–	18	.400
UMass Lowell	4	–	12	.250	4	–	25	.138
New Hampshire	3	–	13	.188	9	–	20	.310
† 2024 AmEast tournament winner

The 2024 America East Women's Basketball Conference tournament was the postseason women's basketball tournament for the America East Conference. It was held March 8–March 15, 2024, at campus sites of the higher seeds. The winner received the conference's automatic bid to the 2024 NCAA Tournament. The tournament was sponsored by Jersey Mike's Subs.

== Seeds ==
Eight of the nine America East teams qualified for the tournament. The teams were seeded by record in conference, with a tiebreaker system to seed teams with identical conference records.

Seed	School	AEC Record	Tiebreaker
1	Maine	14–2	
2	Albany	13–3	
3	Vermont	12–4	
4	Bryant	8–8	2–0 vs. Binghampton
5	Binghamton	8–8	0–2 vs. Bryant
6	UMBC	6–10	
7	NJIT	4–12	1–1 vs. Bryant
8	UMass Lowell	4–12	0–2 vs. Bryant
DNQ	New Hampshire	3–13	

== Schedule ==
Game	Time*	Matchup^{#}	Score	Television
Quarterfinals – Friday, March 8
1	5:00 pm	No. 8 UMass Lowell at No. 1 Maine	43–49	ESPN+
2	7:00 pm	No. 7 NJIT at No. 2 Albany	42–57	ESPN+
3	6:00 pm	No. 6 UMBC at No. 3 Vermont	41–54	ESPN+
4	6:00 pm	No. 5 Binghamton at No. 4 Bryant	56–51	ESPN+
Semifinals – Monday, March 11
5	6:00 PM	No. 5 Binghampton at No. 1 Maine	58–64	ESPN+
6	7:00 PM	No. 3 Vermont at No. 2 Albany	50–46	ESPN+
Championship – Friday, March 15
7	5:00 pm	No. 3 Vermont at No. 1 Maine	48–64	ESPNU/ESPN+
*Game times in EST. #-Rankings denote tournament seeding.

== Bracket ==
Quarterfinals; Friday, March 8, 2024; ESPN+
1	Maine	49
8	UMass Lowell	43
4	Bryant	51
5	Binghamton	56
(Pairings are reseeded after the first round)
3	Vermont	54
6	UMBC	41
2	Albany	57
7	NJIT	42

Semifinals; Monday, March 11, 2024; ESPN+
1	Maine	64
5	Binghamton	58
2	Albany	46
3	Vermont	50

Championship; Friday, March 15, 2024; ESPNU/ESPN+
1	Maine	64
3	Vermont	48

== See also ==
- 2024 America East men's basketball tournament
- America East Conference women's basketball tournament
