= 2023–24 Vermont Catamounts women's basketball team =

Intercollegiate basketball team

2023–24 Vermont Catamounts women's basketball

WNIT, semifinals
- Conference: America East Conference
- Record: 25–12 (12–4 America East)
- Head coach: Alisa Kresge (5th season)
- Associate head coach: Will Lanie
- Assistant coaches: Nevena Markovic; Joe Dicruttalo
- Home arena: Patrick Gym

2023–24 America East Conference women's basketball standings
	Conf.				Overall
Team	W		L	PCT	W		L	PCT
Maine †	14	–	2	.875	24	–	10	.706
Albany	13	–	3	.813	25	–	7	.781
Vermont	12	–	4	.750	25	–	12	.676
Bryant	8	–	8	.500	15	–	15	.500
Binghamton	8	–	8	.500	14	–	17	.452
UMBC	6	–	10	.375	10	–	19	.345
NJIT	4	–	12	.250	12	–	18	.400
UMass Lowell	4	–	12	.250	4	–	25	.138
New Hampshire	3	–	13	.188	9	–	20	.310
† 2024 AmEast tournament winner

The 2023–24 Vermont Catamounts women's basketball team represented the University of Vermont during the 2023–24 NCAA Division I women's basketball season. The Catamounts, led by fifth-year head coach Alisa Kresge, played their home games in the Patrick Gym in Burlington, Vermont and were members in the America East Conference.

== Roster ==
2023–24 Vermont Catamounts women's basketball team
Players
Coaches

Pos.	#	Name	Height	Year	Previous school	Hometown
G	0	Malia Lenz	5 ft 10 in (1.78 m)	Fr	Abbotsford Senior Secondary School	Chilliwack, BC
G	1	Lexi Kerstein	5 ft 6 in (1.68 m)	Fr	Deerfield HS	Riverwoods, IL
G	4	Andjela Matic	5 ft 8 in (1.73 m)	So	ŽKK Šabac	Ub, Serbia
G	10	Bella Vito	5 ft 9 in (1.75 m)	Jr	Montville Township	Towaco, NJ
G	11	Nika Kurdija	5 ft 9 in (1.75 m)	So	Slavonski Brod	Gornja Vrba, Croatia
G	12	Keira Hanson	5 ft 8 in (1.73 m)	So	Issaquah	Issaquah, WA
G	13	Paula Gonzalez	5 ft 11 in (1.8 m)	So	Vitória S.C.	Sarria, Spain
G	14	Catherine Gilwee	5 ft 8 in (1.73 m)	Jr	Champlain Valley Union	Shelburne, VT
G	23	Emma Utterback	5 ft 8 in (1.73 m)	GS	Center Grove	Greenwood, IN
F	24	Anna Olson	6 ft 1 in (1.85 m)	Sr	Monticello	Monticello, MN
C	25	Nikola Priede	6 ft 2 in (1.88 m)	So	TTT Riga	Riga, Latvia
F	33	Delaney Richason	6 ft 1 in (1.85 m)	GS	Zionsville	Zionsville, IN
F	34	Sarah Lazar	6 ft 3 in (1.91 m)	Jr	Edgewood HS; Saint Louis	Madison, WI
F	41	Zenia Palaska	6 ft 2 in (1.88 m)	Fr	Athens, Greece

Head coach

- Alisa Kresge (Marist)

Assistant coach(es)

- Will Lanie (Georgia Tech)
- Nevena Markovic (IUPUI)
- Joe Dicruttalo (Westfield State)

Legend

- (C) Team captain
- (S) Suspended
- (I) Ineligible
- (W) Walk-on
- Injured
- Current redshirt

Roster
Last update: September 17, 2024

== Schedule and results ==
Date time, TV	Rank^{#}	Opponent^{#}	Result	Record	Site (attendance) city, state
Exhibition
November 2, 2023*; 6:00 p.m.		Saint Michael's	W 82–35		Patrick Gym; Burlington, VT
Non-conference regular season
November 6, 2023*; 5:00 p.m., ESPN+		Miami (OH)	W 60–48	1–0	Patrick Gym (566); Burlington, VT
November 10, 2023*; 7:00 p.m., FloHoops		at Providence	L 47–57	1–1	Alumni Hall (777); Providence, RI
November 17, 2023*; 4:00 p.m., ESPN+		at Quinnipiac	W 58–53	2–1	M&T Bank Arena (303); Hamden, CT
November 19, 2023*; 1:00 p.m., ESPN+		Saint Rose	W 60–44	3–1	Patrick Gym (653); Burlington, VT
November 24, 2023*; 1:30 p.m., FloHoops		vs. No. 18 North Carolina; Gulf Coast Showcase first round	L 51–54	3–2	Hertz Arena (327); Estero, FL
November 25, 2023*; 11:00 a.m., FloHoops		vs. Western Kentucky; Gulf Coast Showcase consolation 2nd round	L 50–62	3–3	Hertz Arena (313); Estero, FL
November 26, 2023*; 11:00 a.m., FloHoops		vs. Delaware; Gulf Coast Showcase 7th-place game	L 66–73	3–4	Hertz Arena (177); Estero, FL
November 30, 2023*; 6:00 p.m., ESPN+		Dartmouth	W 58–32	4–4	Patrick Gym (601); Burlington, VT
December 3, 2023*; 12:00 p.m., ESPN+		Holy Cross	W 46–44	5–4	Patrick Gym (740); Burlington, VT
December 6, 2023*; 5:00 p.m., ESPN+		at Army	W 62–42	6–4	Christl Arena (200); West Point, NY
December 9, 2023*; 12:00 p.m., ESPN+		at Manhattan	L 43–53	6–5	Draddy Gymnasium (402); Riverdale, NY
December 16, 2023*; 2:00 p.m., ESPN+		Duquesne	W 77–61	7–5	Patrick Gym (871); Burlington, VT
December 20, 2023*; 11:00 a.m., ESPN+		Sacred Heart	W 70–64	8–5	Patrick Gym (904); Burlington, VT
December 29, 2023*; 1:00 p.m., ESPN+		Princeton	L 47–67	8–6	Patrick Gym (1,229); Burlington, VT
America East regular season
January 4, 2024; 6:00 p.m., ESPN+		New Hampshire	W 67–58	9–6 (1–0)	Patrick Gym (607); Burlington, VT
January 6, 2024; 1:00 p.m., ESPN+		at Maine	L 48–60	9–7 (1–1)	Memorial Gymnasium (1,207); Orono, ME
January 11, 2024; 11:00 a.m., ESPN+		at UMBC	W 70–55	10–7 (2–1)	Chesapeake Employers Insurance Arena (2,334); Baltimore, MD
January 13, 2024; 1:00 p.m., ESPN+		at NJIT	W 68–55	11–7 (3–1)	Wellness and Events Center (302); Newark, NJ
January 18, 2024; 6:00 p.m., ESPN+		Binghamton	W 51–38	12–7 (4–1)	Patrick Gym (565); Burlington, VT
January 25, 2024; 11:00 a.m., ESPN+		UMass Lowell	W 62–53	13–7 (5–1)	Patrick Gym (2,555); Burlington, VT
January 27, 2024; 2:00 p.m., ESPN+		Bryant	W 61–35	14–7 (6–1)	Patrick Gym (1,204); Burlington, VT
February 1, 2024; 7:00 p.m., ESPN+		at Albany	W 64–59	15–7 (7–1)	Broadview Center (1,119); Troy, NY
February 3, 2024; 2:00 p.m., ESPN+		at Binghamton	L 57–66	15–8 (7–2)	Binghamton University Events Center (1,507); Vestal, NY
February 8, 2024; 6:00 p.m., ESPN+		NJIT	W 76–51	16–8 (8–2)	Patrick Gym (662); Burlington, VT
February 10, 2024; 2:00 p.m., ESPN+		UMBC	W 69–45	17–8 (9–2)	Patrick Gym (1,838); Burlington, VT
February 15, 2024; 6:00 p.m., ESPN+		at New Hampshire	W 75–41	18–8 (10–2)	Lundholm Gym (234); Durham, NH
February 17, 2024; 4:00 p.m., ESPN+		Maine	L 55–57	18–9 (10–3)	Patrick Gym; Burlington, VT
February 22, 2024; 6:00 p.m., ESPN+		Albany	W 67–35	19–9 (11–3)	Patrick Gym (945); Burlington, VT
February 24, 2024; 2:00 p.m., ESPN+		at Bryant	L 52–57	19–10 (11–4)	Chace Athletic Center (421); Smithfield, RI
March 2, 2024; 3:00 p.m., ESPN+		at UMass Lowell	W 55–51	20–10 (12–4)	Costello Athletic Center (569); Lowell, MA
America East women's tournament
March 8, 2024; 6:00 p.m., ESPN+	(3)	(6) UMBC; Quarterfinals	W 54–41	21–10	Patrick Gym (1,320); Burlington, VT
March 11, 2024; 7:00 p.m., ESPN+	(3)	at (2) Albany; Semifinals	W 50–46	22–10	Broadview Center (1,281); Albany, NY
March 15, 2024; 5:00 p.m., ESPNU	(3)	at (1) Maine; Championship	L 48–64	22–11	Memorial Gymnasium (1,507); Orono, ME
WNIT
March 25, 2024*; 6:00 p.m., ESPN+		Niagara; Second round	W 69–63	23–11	Patrick Gym (781); Burlington, VT
March 29, 2024*; 6:00 p.m., ESPN+		Colgate; Super 16	W 65–55	24–11	Patrick Gym (1,232); Burlington, VT
April 1, 2024*; 7:00 p.m., BTN+		at Purdue; Great 8	W 67–59	25–11	Mackey Arena (2,679); West Lafayette, IN
April 3, 2024*; 6:00 p.m., ESPN+		Saint Louis; Fab 4	L 54–57	25–12	Patrick Gym (1,694); Burlington, VT
*Non-conference game. ^{#}Rankings from AP poll. (#) Tournament seedings in parentheses. All times are in Eastern.

== See also ==
- 2023–24 Vermont Catamounts men's basketball team
