= 2023–24 New Hampshire Wildcats women's basketball team =

American college basketball season

2023–24 New Hampshire Wildcats women's basketball
- Conference: America East Conference
- Record: 9–20 (3–13 America East)
- Head coach: Kelsey Hogan (4th season)
- Assistant coaches: Mandy Pennewell; Lindsay Werner; Amara Mills
- Home arena: Lundholm Gym

2023–24 America East Conference women's basketball standings
	Conf.				Overall
Team	W		L	PCT	W		L	PCT
Maine †	14	–	2	.875	24	–	10	.706
Albany	13	–	3	.813	25	–	7	.781
Vermont	12	–	4	.750	25	–	12	.676
Bryant	8	–	8	.500	15	–	15	.500
Binghamton	8	–	8	.500	14	–	17	.452
UMBC	6	–	10	.375	10	–	19	.345
NJIT	4	–	12	.250	12	–	18	.400
UMass Lowell	4	–	12	.250	4	–	25	.138
New Hampshire	3	–	13	.188	9	–	20	.310
† 2024 AmEast tournament winner

The 2023–24 New Hampshire Wildcats women's basketball team represented the University of New Hampshire during the 2023–24 NCAA Division I women's basketball season. The Wildcats, led by fourth-year head coach Kelsey Hogan, played their home games at the Lundholm Gym located in Durham, New Hampshire as members of the America East Conference.

The Wildcats finished the season 9–20, 3–13 in America East play, to finish in last place. Since only the top eight teams make it, the Wildcats failed to qualify for the America East tournament.

== Previous season ==
The Wildcats finished the 2022–23 season 7–21, 2–14 in America East play to finish in last (ninth) place. Since only the top eight teams make it, the Wildcats failed to qualify for the America East tournament.

== Roster ==
2023–24 New Hampshire Wildcats women's basketball team
Players
Coaches

Pos.	#	Name	Height	Year	Previous school	Hometown
G	0	Maggie Cavanaugh	5 ft 9 in (1.75 m)	Fr	St. Rose High School	Point Pleasant Beach, NJ
G	3	Bella Stuart	5 ft 11 in (1.8 m)	Sr	Shenendehowa High School	Clifton Park, NY
G	5	Breezie Williams	5 ft 5 in (1.65 m)	So	GlenOak High School	Canton, OH
G	10	Diana Eliasson	5 ft 7 in (1.7 m)	So	Luleå gymnasieskola	Stockholm, Sweden
G	11	Avery O'Connor	6 ft 0 in (1.83 m)	So	Dedham High School	Dedham, MA
G	12	Adara Groman	5 ft 8 in (1.73 m)	Sr	Worcester Academy	Scituate, MA
G	13	Clara Gomez	6 ft 1 in (1.85 m)	Jr	Colorado State	Barcelona, Spain
F	14	Sharmela Reid	6 ft 1 in (1.85 m)	Fr	Dawson College	Montreal, QC
G	20	Karolina Andersson	5 ft 11 in (1.8 m)	So	Haga Gymnasiet	Söderköping, Sweden
G	21	Aina Roque Sucarrats	5 ft 9 in (1.75 m)	So	Antoni Torroja Highschool	Cervera, Spain
C	23	Paige Cote	6 ft 2 in (1.88 m)	Sr	Sanford High School	Sanford, ME
G	24	Kenzie Matulonis	5 ft 7 in (1.7 m)	Jr	Bridgewater-Raynham High School	Raynham, MA
F	32	Lucia Melero Sabat	6 ft 0 in (1.83 m)	So	N/A	Barcelona, Spain
G	42	Belen Morales Lopez	6 ft 0 in (1.83 m)	Sr	Casper College	Alicante, Spain

Head coach

- Kelsey Hogan (New Hampshire)

Assistant coach(es)

- Mandy Pennewell (Quinnipiac)
- Lindsay Werner (Merrimack)
- Amara Mills (Grand Canyon)

Legend

- (C) Team captain
- (S) Suspended
- (I) Ineligible
- (W) Walk-on
- Injured
- Current redshirt

Roster
Last update: December 11, 2023

== Schedule and results ==
Date time, TV	Rank^{#}	Opponent^{#}	Result	Record	Site (attendance) city, state
Non-conference regular season
November 6, 2023*; 6:03 p.m., ESPN+		New England	W 73–39	1–0	Lundholm Gym (282); Durham, NH
November 10, 2023*; 5:00 p.m., ESPN+		at Boston University	L 47–56	1–1	Case Gym (510); Boston, MA
November 12, 2023*; 5:00 p.m., ESPN+		Howard	W 59–51	2–1	Lundholm Gym (194); Durham, NH
November 15, 2023*; 8:30 p.m., MWN		at Colorado State	L 45–67	2–2	Moby Arena (1,040); Fort Collins, CO
November 18, 2023*; 5:00 p.m.		at UNLV	L 30–93	2–3	Cox Pavilion (724); Paradise, NV
November 22, 2023*; 2:00 p.m., ESPN+		Utah Tech	L 46–56	2–4	Lundholm Gym (166); Durham, NH
November 26, 2023*; 1:00 p.m., ESPN+		Dartmouth	L 40–43	2–5	Lundholm Gym (343); Durham, NH
November 29, 2023*; 6:03 p.m., ESPN+		Northeastern	W 51–41	3–5	Lundholm Gym (238); Durham, NH
December 2, 2023*; 1:00 p.m., ESPN+		Central Connecticut	W 79–64	4–5	Lundholm Gym (265); Durham, NH
December 6, 2023*; 6:00 p.m., NEC Front Row		at Stonehill	W 68–41	5–5	Merkert Gymnasium (327); Easton, MA
December 9, 2023*; 12:00 p.m., ESPN+		Brown	L 52–53	5–6	Lundholm Gym (218); Durham, NH
December 20, 2023*; 11:00 a.m., ESPN+		at Saint Joseph's; Hawk Classic	L 54–72	5–7	Hagan Arena (804); Philadelphia, PA
December 21, 2023*; 11:00 a.m., ESPN+		vs. Wagner; Hawk Classic	W 73–52	6–7	Hagan Arena (127); Philadelphia, PA
America East regular season
January 4, 2024; 6:00 p.m., ESPN+		at Vermont	L 58–67	6–8 (0–1)	Patrick Gym (607); Burlington, VT
January 6, 2024; 2:00 p.m., ESPN+		at UMass Lowell	L 53–70	6–9 (0–2)	Costello Athletic Center (275); Lowell, MA
January 11, 2024; 6:03 p.m., ESPN+		Maine	L 52–78	6–10 (0–3)	Lundholm Gym (311); Durham, NH
January 13, 2024; 2:00 p.m., ESPN+		at Bryant	L 54–55	6–11 (0–4)	Chace Athletic Center (273); Smithfield, RI
January 18, 2024; 6:03 p.m., ESPN+		NJIT	W 56–50	7–11 (1–4)	Lundholm Gym (166); Durham, NH
January 20, 2024; 12:00 p.m., ESPN+		UMBC	W 56–37	8–11 (2–4)	Lundholm Gym (292); Durham, NH
January 25, 2024; 6:07 p.m., ESPN+		at Binghamton	L 63–73	8–12 (2–5)	Binghamton University Events Center (1,303); Vestal, NY
January 27, 2024; 2:00 p.m., ESPN+		at Albany	L 46–54	8–13 (2–6)	Broadview Center (1,349); Albany, NY
February 3, 2024; 3:00 p.m., ESPN+		UMass Lowell	W 66–52	9–13 (3–6)	Lundholm Gym (558); Durham, NH
February 8, 2024; 6:03 p.m., ESPN+		Bryant	L 68–71	9–14 (3–7)	Lundholm Gym (197); Durham, NH
February 10, 2024; 2:00 p.m., ESPN+		at Maine	L 48–67	9–15 (3–8)	The Pit at Memorial Gymnasium (1,425); Orono, ME
February 15, 2024; 6:03 p.m., ESPN+		Vermont	L 41–75	9–16 (3–9)	Lundholm Gym (234); Durham, NH
February 22, 2024; 7:00 p.m., ESPN+		at NJIT	L 52–64	9–17 (3–10)	Wellness and Events Center (255); Newark, NJ
February 24, 2024; 1:00 p.m., ESPN+		at UMBC	L 43–53	9–18 (3–11)	Chesapeake Employers Insurance Arena (387); Catonsville, MD
February 29, 2024; 6:03 p.m., ESPN+		Albany	L 40–45	9–19 (3–12)	Lundholm Gym (244); Durham, NH
March 2, 2024; 1:00 p.m., ESPN+		Binghamton	L 56–65	9–20 (3–13)	Lundholm Gym (334); Durham, NH
*Non-conference game. ^{#}Rankings from AP poll. (#) Tournament seedings in parentheses. All times are in Eastern.
