= 2023–24 UMBC Retrievers women's basketball team =

American college basketball season

2023–24 UMBC Retrievers women's basketball
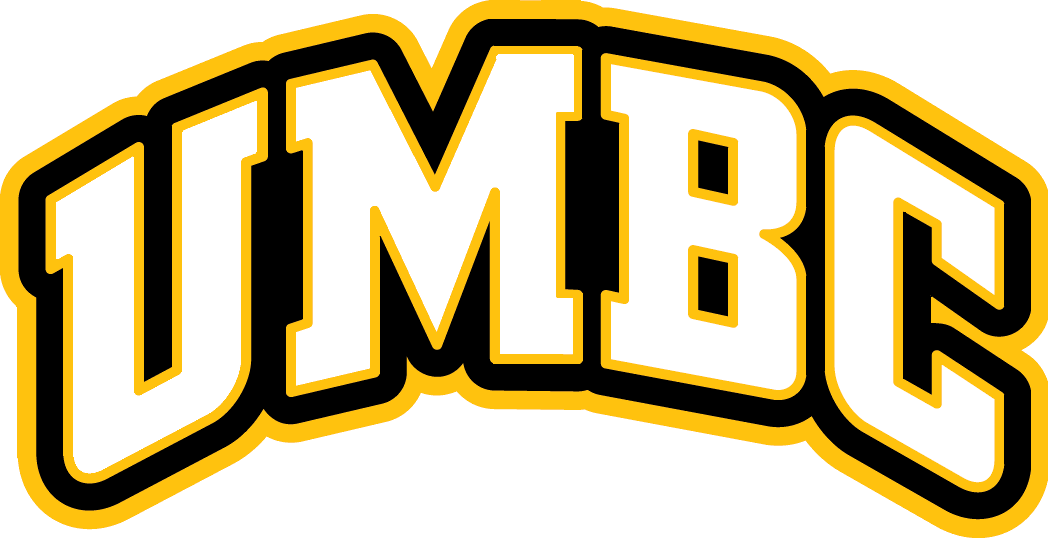
- Conference: America East Conference
- Record: 10–19 (6–10 America East)
- Head coach: Johnetta Hayes (4th season)
- Associate head coach: TJ Royals
- Assistant coaches: LaDe'yah Forte'; Dexter Holt
- Home arena: Chesapeake Employers Insurance Arena

2023–24 America East Conference women's basketball standings
	Conf.				Overall
Team	W		L	PCT	W		L	PCT
Maine †	14	–	2	.875	24	–	10	.706
Albany	13	–	3	.813	25	–	7	.781
Vermont	12	–	4	.750	25	–	12	.676
Bryant	8	–	8	.500	15	–	15	.500
Binghamton	8	–	8	.500	14	–	17	.452
UMBC	6	–	10	.375	10	–	19	.345
NJIT	4	–	12	.250	12	–	18	.400
UMass Lowell	4	–	12	.250	4	–	25	.138
New Hampshire	3	–	13	.188	9	–	20	.310
† 2024 AmEast tournament winner

The 2023–24 UMBC Retrievers women's basketball team represented the University of Maryland, Baltimore County during the 2023–24 NCAA Division I women's basketball season. The Retrievers were led by fourth-year head coach Johnetta Hayes, and played their home games at the Chesapeake Employers Insurance Arena in Catonsville, Maryland as members of the America East Conference.

== Previous season ==
The Retrievers finished the 2022–23 season 14–15, 10–6 in America East play, to finish in fourth place. They defeated NJIT in the quarterfinals, before falling to top-seeded and eventual tournament champions Vermont in the semifinals of the America East tournament.

== Roster ==
2023–24 UMBC Retrievers women's basketball team
Players
Coaches

Pos.	#	Name	Height	Year	Previous school	Hometown
G	2	Laycee Drake	5 ft 6 in (1.68 m)	Jr	Hancock High School	Hancock, NY
G	3	Jaliena Sanchez	5 ft 5 in (1.65 m)	GS	UMass Lowell	Springfield, MA
G	4	Riley Donahue	5 ft 10 in (1.78 m)	Sr	Auburn	Atlanta, GA
G/F	5	Jordon Lewis	5 ft 10 in (1.78 m)	GS	La Salle	Houston, TX
G	10	Grace Ceseretti	5 ft 9 in (1.75 m)	So	Northfield Mount Hermon School	Barrington, RI
G	11	Anne Adewumi	5 ft 10 in (1.78 m)	Fr	Royal Crown Academy	Winnipeg, MB
G	12	Trinity Palacio	5 ft 4 in (1.63 m)	GS	Charleston	Accokeek, MD
F	13	Paloma Iradier	6 ft 3 in (1.91 m)	RS Jr	Little Rock	Santander, Spain
F	14	Maryama Turkstra	6 ft 2 in (1.88 m)	Sr	Central Michigan	Dundas, ON
G	15	Carmen Yánez	5 ft 6 in (1.68 m)	So	Institut Martí Dot	Las Palmas, Canary Islands
F	22	Jaden Walker	5 ft 10 in (1.78 m)	GS	Saint Joseph's	New Freedom, PA
F/C	24	Anna Blount	6 ft 1 in (1.85 m)	GS	UC Riverside	Stockton, CA
C	33	Laura Lacambra	6 ft 2 in (1.88 m)	So	Escola Sant Gabriel de Viladecans	Viladecans, Spain

Head coach

- Johnetta Hayes (Rice)

Assistant coach(es)

- TJ Royals (Texas Southern)
- LaDe'yah Forte' (Jacksonville)
- Dexter Holt (Alabama A&M)

Legend

- (C) Team captain
- (S) Suspended
- (I) Ineligible
- (W) Walk-on
- Injured
- Current redshirt

Roster
Last update: December 12, 2023

== Schedule and results ==
Date time, TV	Rank^{#}	Opponent^{#}	Result	Record	Site (attendance) city, state
Non-conference regular season
November 6, 2023*; 7:00 p.m., FloHoops		at Towson	L 72–76	0–1	SECU Arena (585); Towson, MD
November 8, 2023*; 7:00 p.m., ESPN+		Gettysburg	W 90–83 ^{4OT}	1–1	Chesapeake Employers Insurance Arena (521); Catonsville, MD
November 11, 2023*; 1:00 p.m., ESPN+		Colgate	L 51–57	1–2	Chesapeake Employers Insurance Arena (482); Catonsville, MD
November 15, 2023*; 7:00 p.m., MASN2/ESPN+		Loyola (MD)	L 48–49	1–3	Binghamton University Events Center (718); Vestal, NY
November 22, 2023*; 9:00 p.m., P12N		at Oregon State	L 52–88	1–4	Gill Coliseum (3,414); Corvallis, OR
November 26, 2023*; 2:00 p.m.		at Maryland Eastern Shore	L 54–70	1–5	Hytche Athletic Center (190); Princess Anne, MD
November 29, 2023*; 7:00 p.m., ESPN+		Lafayette	L 53–59	1–6	Chesapeake Employers Insurance Arena (312); Catonsville, MD
December 3, 2023*; 2:00 p.m., ESPN+		at Manhattan	L 52–68	1–7	Draddy Gymnasium (142); Riverdale, NY
December 5, 2023*; 7:00 p.m., ESPN+		Bryant & Stratton	W 92–55	2–7	Chesapeake Employers Insurance Arena (278); Catonsville, MD
December 9, 2023*; 2:00 p.m.		at Morgan State	L 42–65	2–8	Talmadge L. Hill Field House (298); Baltimore, MD
December 20, 2023*; 12:30 p.m., ESPN+		at American	W 60–59	3–8	Bender Arena (129); Washington, D.C.
December 29, 2023*; 4:00 p.m., ESPN+		Saint Francis	W 85–53	4–8	Chesapeake Employers Insurance Arena (327); Catonsville, MD
America East regular season
January 4, 2024; 6:07 p.m., ESPN+		at Binghamton	W 70–55	5–8 (1–0)	Binghamton University Events Center (804); Vestal, NY
January 6, 2024; 2:00 p.m., ESPN+		at Bryant	W 64–63	6–8 (2–0)	Chace Athletic Center (275); Smithfield, RI
January 11, 2024; 11:00 a.m., ESPN+		Vermont; Midday Madness	L 55–70	6–9 (2–1)	Chesapeake Employers Insurance Arena (2,334); Catonsville, MD
January 13, 2024; 1:00 p.m., ESPN+		UMass Lowell	L 46–59	6–10 (2–2)	Chesapeake Employers Insurance Arena (177); Catonsville, MD
January 18, 2024; 6:00 p.m., ESPN+		at Maine	L 47–76	6–11 (2–3)	The Pit at Memorial Gymnasium (1,045); Orono, ME
January 20, 2024; 12:00 p.m., ESPN+		at New Hampshire	L 37–56	6–12 (2–4)	Lundholm Gym (292); Durham, NH
January 27, 2024; 3:00 p.m., ESPN+		at NJIT	W 72–61	7–12 (3–4)	Wellness and Events Center (325); Newark, NJ
February 1, 2024; 6:00 p.m., ESPN+		Bryant	W 54–52	8–12 (4–4)	Chesapeake Employers Insurance Arena (324); Catonsville, MD
February 3, 2024; 1:00 p.m., ESPN+		Albany	L 55–69	8–13 (4–5)	Chesapeake Employers Insurance Arena (339); Catonsville, MD
February 8, 2024; 6:00 p.m., ESPN+		at UMass Lowell	L 60–71	8–14 (4–6)	Costello Athletic Center (300); Lowell, MA
February 10, 2024; 2:00 p.m., ESPN+		at Vermont	L 45–69	8–15 (4–7)	Patrick Gym (1,838); Burlington, VT
February 15, 2024; 7:00 p.m., ESPN+		Binghamton	L 44–52	8–16 (4–8)	Chesapeake Employers Insurance Arena (333); Catonsville, MD
February 17, 2024; 7:00 p.m., ESPN+		at Albany	L 56–58	8–17 (4–9)	Broadview Center (1,111); Albany, NY
February 22, 2024; 7:00 p.m., ESPN+		Maine	W 67–59	9–17 (5–9)	Chesapeake Employers Insurance Arena (339); Catonsville, MD
February 24, 2024; 1:00 p.m., ESPN+		New Hampshire	W 53–43	10–17 (6–9)	Chesapeake Employers Insurance Arena (387); Catonsville, MD
February 29, 2024; 7:00 p.m., ESPN+		NJIT; Senior Night	L 76–77	10–18 (6–10)	Chesapeake Employers Insurance Arena (347); Catonsville, MD
American East tournament
March 8, 2024; 6:00 p.m., ESPN+	(6)	(3) Vermont; Quarterfinals	L 41–54	10–19	Patrick Gym (1,096); Burlington, VT
*Non-conference game. ^{#}Rankings from AP poll. (#) Tournament seedings in parentheses. All times are in Eastern.
