= Marti Stevens =

Marti Stevens may refer to:

- Marti Stevens (actress) (b. 1928), American singer and actress
- Marti Stevens (educator) (c. 1939–1993), American community educator and theatre director
