= 2023–24 Bryant Bulldogs women's basketball team =

American college basketball season

2023–24 Bryant Bulldogs women's basketball
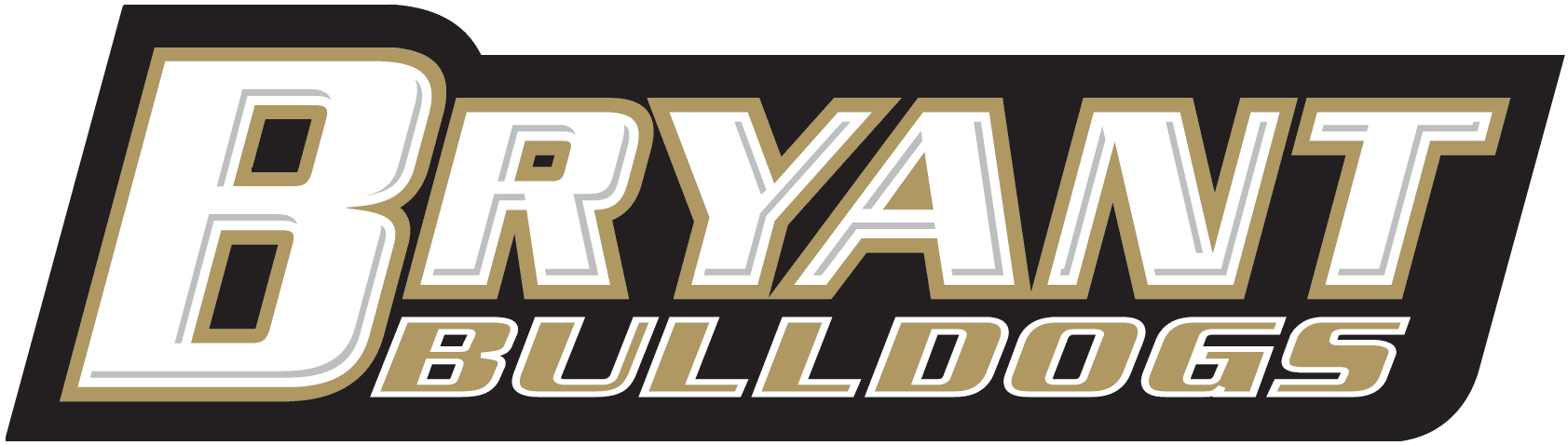
- Conference: America East Conference
- Record: 15–15 (8–8 America East)
- Head coach: Lynne-Ann Kokoski (1st season)
- Assistant coaches: Cristina Centeno; Sarah Assante
- Home arena: Chace Athletic Center

2023–24 America East Conference women's basketball standings
	Conf.				Overall
Team	W		L	PCT	W		L	PCT
Maine †	14	–	2	.875	24	–	10	.706
Albany	13	–	3	.813	25	–	7	.781
Vermont	12	–	4	.750	25	–	12	.676
Bryant	8	–	8	.500	15	–	15	.500
Binghamton	8	–	8	.500	14	–	17	.452
UMBC	6	–	10	.375	10	–	19	.345
NJIT	4	–	12	.250	12	–	18	.400
UMass Lowell	4	–	12	.250	4	–	25	.138
New Hampshire	3	–	13	.188	9	–	20	.310
† 2024 AmEast tournament winner

The 2023–24 Bryant Bulldogs women's basketball team represented Bryant University during the 2023–24 NCAA Division I women's basketball season. The Bulldogs, led by first-year head coach Lynne-Ann Kokoski, played their home games at the Chace Athletic Center in Smithfield, Rhode Island, as members of the America East Conference.

== Previous season ==
The Bulldogs finished the 2022–23 season 9–21, 3–13 in America East play, to finish in eighth place. They were defeated by top-seeded and eventual tournament champions Vermont in the quarterfinals of the America East tournament.

On March 6, 2023, head coach Mary Burke announced that she would be stepping down after 32 years as head coach. On April 13, it was announced that UMass assistant coach and Bryant alum Lynne-Ann Kokoski would be named the Bulldogs' next head coach.

== Roster ==
2023–24 Bryant Bulldogs women's basketball team
Players
Coaches

Pos.	#	Name	Height	Year	Previous school	Hometown
G	0	Breya Busby	5 ft 4 in (1.63 m)	So	Liberty	Orlando, FL
G	1	Nina Karlin	5 ft 7 in (1.7 m)	Sr	Classical HS	Providence, RI
G	2	Mia Mancini	5 ft 6 in (1.68 m)	Fr	Wheeler School	Mansfield, MA
G	4	Lucie Castagne	5 ft 4 in (1.63 m)	Sr	Putnam Science Academy	Paris, France
F/C	5	Mariona Planes Fortuny	6 ft 3 in (1.91 m)	Sr	Ins Lo Pla d'Urgell	Bellpuig, Spain
G	10	Kemari Reynolds	5 ft 7 in (1.7 m)	Sr	Penn	Manchester Township, NJ
G/F	11	Alana Scott	5 ft 8 in (1.73 m)	Fr	St. Andrew's School	Groveland, MA
C	13	Jessica Berens	6 ft 4 in (1.93 m)	RS So	Coginchaug Regional HS	Durham, CT
F	14	Silvia Gonzalez	6 ft 2 in (1.88 m)	Fr	INS Joaquim Blume	Sant Adrià de Besòs, Spain
G	24	Megan Bodziony	5 ft 10 in (1.78 m)	Sr	Fordham	Wakefield, RI
F	31	Alejandra Ferreirós	6 ft 1 in (1.85 m)	So	Colegio Estudiantes	Madrid, Spain
F	32	Martina Boba	6 ft 1 in (1.85 m)	Fr	Institut Argentona	Argentona, Spain
G	33	Marta Neira Martinez	6 ft 0 in (1.83 m)	Jr	N/A	Barcelona, Spain
G	42	Stephanie Mayerhofer	5 ft 7 in (1.7 m)	Sr	Middletown HS South	Red Bank, NJ
F	55	Nia Scott	6 ft 1 in (1.85 m)	Fr	Shawnee HS	Medford Lakes, NJ

Head coach

- Lynne-Ann Kokoski (Bryant)

Assistant coach(es)

- Cristina Centeno (Siena)
- Sarah Assante (Saint Joseph's (ME))

Legend

- (C) Team captain
- (S) Suspended
- (I) Ineligible
- (W) Walk-on
- Injured
- Current redshirt

Roster
Last update: December 11, 2023

== Schedule and results ==
Date time, TV	Rank^{#}	Opponent^{#}	Result	Record	Site (attendance) city, state
Non-conference regular season
November 6, 2023*; 5:00 p.m., ESPN+		Dartmouth	W 70–52	1–0	Chace Athletic Center (562); Smithfield, RI
November 12, 2023*; 1:00 p.m., FloHoops		at Seton Hall	L 45–73	1–1	Walsh Gymnasium (565); South Orange, NJ
November 14, 2023*; 6:00 p.m., NEC Front Row		at Stonehill	W 69–49	2–1	Merkert Gymnasium (118); Easton, MA
November 17, 2023*; 6:00 p.m., ESPN+		Central Connecticut	W 72–69	3–1	Chace Athletic Center (253); Smithfield, RI
November 21, 2023*; 7:00 p.m., NEC Front Row		at Merrimack	L 60–65	3–2	Hammel Court; North Andover, MA
November 24, 2023*; 12:00 p.m., ESPN+		at FIU; FIU Thanksgiving Tournament	L 59–88	3–3	Ocean Bank Convocation Center (324); Miami, FL
November 26, 2023*; 12:00 p.m.		vs. Tennessee State; FIU Thanksgiving Tournament	L 43–53	3–4	Ocean Bank Convocation Center; Miami, FL
November 29, 2023*; 6:00 p.m., ESPN+		Brown; Ocean State Cup	L 53–58	3–5	Chace Athletic Center (315); Smithfield, RI
December 2, 2023*; 2:00 p.m., ESPN+		Sacred Heart	W 74–71 ^{OT}	4–5	Chace Athletic Center (225); Smithfield, RI
December 6, 2023*; 11:00 a.m., ESPN+		at Loyola (MD)	W 63–54	5–5	Reitz Arena (1,349); Baltimore, MD
December 13, 2023*; 5:00 p.m., ESPN+		Fisher	W 93–20	6–5	Chace Athletic Center (200); Smithfield, RI
December 20, 2023*; 7:00 p.m., ACCNX		at Boston College	L 57–94	6–6	Conte Forum (633); Chestnut Hill, MA
December 30, 2023*; 2:00 p.m., ESPN+		Bridgewater State	W 98–68	7–6	Chace Athletic Center (225); Smithfield, RI
America East regular season
January 4, 2024; 7:00 p.m., ESPN+		at Albany	L 50–69	7–7 (0–1)	Broadview Center (875); Albany, NY
January 6, 2024; 2:00 p.m., ESPN+		UMBC	L 63–64	7–8 (0–2)	Chace Athletic Center (275); Smithfield, RI
January 11, 2024; 11:00 a.m., ESPN+		at Binghamton	W 62–51	8–8 (1–2)	Binghamton University Events Center (3,429); Vestal, NY
January 13, 2024; 2:00 p.m., ESPN+		New Hampshire	W 55–54	9–8 (2–2)	Chace Athletic Center (273); Smithfield, RI
January 20, 2024; 2:00 p.m., ESPN+		Albany	L 62–64	9–9 (2–3)	Chace Athletic Center (265); Smithfield, RI
January 25, 2024; 6:00 p.m., ESPN+		NJIT	W 73–64	10–9 (3–3)	Chace Athletic Center (278); Smithfield, RI
January 27, 2024; 2:00 p.m., ESPN+		at Vermont	L 35–61	10–10 (3–4)	Patrick Gym (1,204); Burlington, VT
February 1, 2024; 6:00 p.m., ESPN+		at UMBC	L 52–54	10–11 (3–5)	Chesapeake Employers Insurance Arena (324); Catonsville, MD
February 3, 2024; 2:00 p.m., ESPN+		Maine	L 58–70	10–12 (3–6)	Chace Athletic Center (308); Smithfield, RI
February 8, 2024; 6:00 p.m., ESPN+		at New Hampshire	W 71–68	11–12 (4–6)	Lundholm Gym (197); Durham, NH
February 10, 2024; 2:00 p.m., ESPN+		Binghamton	W 55–51	12–12 (5–6)	Chace Athletic Center (401); Smithfield, RI
February 15, 2024; 6:00 p.m., ESPN+		at Maine	L 57–80	12–13 (5–7)	The Pit at Memorial Gymnasium (1,156); Orono, ME
February 17, 2024; 2:00 p.m., ESPN+		at UMass Lowell	W 62–43	13–13 (6–7)	Costello Athletic Center (307); Lowell, MA
February 24, 2024; 2:00 p.m., ESPN+		Vermont	W 57–52	14–13 (7–7)	Chace Athletic Center (421); Smithfield, RI
February 29, 2024; 6:00 p.m., ESPN+		UMass Lowell	W 60–51	15–13 (8–7)	Chace Athletic Center (226); Smithfield, RI
March 2, 2024; 2:00 p.m., ESPN+		at NJIT	L 38–64	15–14 (8–8)	Wellness and Events Center (606); Newark, NJ
America East tournament
March 8, 2024; 6:00 p.m., ESPN+	(4)	(5) Binghamton; Quarterfinals	L 51–56	15–15	Chace Athletic Center (325); Smithfield, RI
*Non-conference game. ^{#}Rankings from AP poll. (#) Tournament seedings in parentheses. All times are in Eastern.
