= 2023–24 Binghamton Bearcats women's basketball team =

American college basketball season

2023–24 Binghamton Bearcats women's basketball
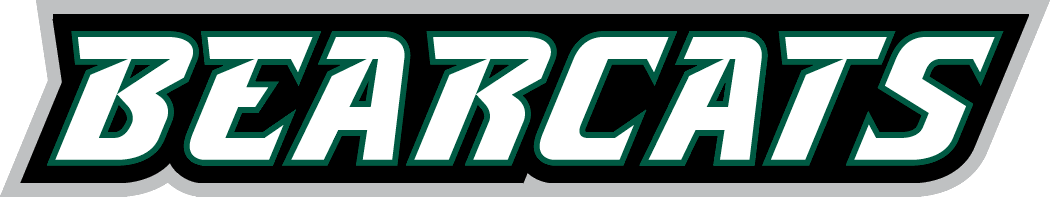
- Conference: America East Conference
- Record: 14–17 (8–8 America East)
- Head coach: Bethann Shapiro Ord (6th season)
- Associate head coach: Devan Newman
- Assistant coaches: Maggie Moore; Nick Moore
- Home arena: Binghamton University Events Center

2023–24 America East Conference women's basketball standings
	Conf.				Overall
Team	W		L	PCT	W		L	PCT
Maine †	14	–	2	.875	24	–	10	.706
Albany	13	–	3	.813	25	–	7	.781
Vermont	12	–	4	.750	25	–	12	.676
Bryant	8	–	8	.500	15	–	15	.500
Binghamton	8	–	8	.500	14	–	17	.452
UMBC	6	–	10	.375	10	–	19	.345
NJIT	4	–	12	.250	12	–	18	.400
UMass Lowell	4	–	12	.250	4	–	25	.138
New Hampshire	3	–	13	.188	9	–	20	.310
† 2024 AmEast tournament winner

The 2023–24 Binghamton Bearcats women's basketball team represented Binghamton University during the 2023–24 NCAA Division I women's basketball season. The Bearcats, led by sixth-year head coach Bethann Shapiro Ord, played their home games at the Binghamton University Events Center in Vestal, New York, as members of the America East Conference.

== Previous season ==
The Bearcats finished the 2022–23 season 13–17, 6–10 in America East play, to finish in sixth place. They were defeated by Maine in the quarterfinals of the America East tournament.

== Roster ==
2023–24 Binghamton Bearcats women's basketball team
Players
Coaches

Pos.	#	Name	Height	Year	Previous school	Hometown
G	0	Yanniah Boyd	5 ft 11 in (1.8 m)	Fr	Riverdale Baptist School	Frederick, MD
G	1	Denai Bowman	5 ft 9 in (1.75 m)	GS	Gwynn Park High School	Clinton, MD
G	2	Anna Long	5 ft 9 in (1.75 m)	So	Miamisburg High School	Miamisburg, OH
G	3	Ella Wanzer	5 ft 10 in (1.78 m)	RS So	Amherst High School	Buffalo, NY
F	4	Kendall Bennett	6 ft 2 in (1.88 m)	Fr	Germantown Academy	Elkins Park, PA
G	5	Meghan Casey	5 ft 9 in (1.75 m)	So	The Ursuline School	White Plains, NY
G/F	10	Camryn Fauria	6 ft 0 in (1.83 m)	So	Bishop Feehan High School	Foxborough, MA
G	11	Kaylee Krysztof	5 ft 9 in (1.75 m)	Fr	Depew High School	Buffalo, NY
F	14	Ava Thomas	5 ft 10 in (1.78 m)	Fr	Ithaca High School	Ithaca, NY
G	20	Bella Pucci	5 ft 9 in (1.75 m)	Fr	Fairport High School	Fairport, NY
F	21	Elena Delicado	6 ft 1 in (1.85 m)	RS Jr	IES Parque de Lisboa	Madrid, Spain
F	22	Ella Okubasu	6 ft 2 in (1.88 m)	So	Crestwood Prep	Toronto, ON
G/F	23	Shannon O'Connor	5 ft 11 in (1.8 m)	GS	Bryant	Wrentham, MA
G	24	Jadyn Weltz	5 ft 7 in (1.7 m)	RS So	O'Gorman High School	Ontario, Canada
F	25	Kaelonn Wilson	6 ft 1 in (1.85 m)	RS So	Buffalo	Piscataway, NJ
F	44	Genevieve Coleman	6 ft 0 in (1.83 m)	Jr	Owego Free Academy	Owego, NY

Head coach

- Bethann Shapiro Ord (UMBC)

Assistant coach(es)

- Devan Newman (Louisville)
- Maggie Moore (Edinboro)
- Nick Moore (Fredonia State)

Legend

- (C) Team captain
- (S) Suspended
- (I) Ineligible
- (W) Walk-on
- Injured
- Current redshirt

Roster
Last update: December 12, 2023

== Schedule and results ==
Date time, TV	Rank^{#}	Opponent^{#}	Result	Record	Site (attendance) city, state
Exhibition
November 3, 2023*; 6:07 p.m.		Roberts Wesleyan	W 74–49	–	Binghamton University Events Center; Vestal, NY
Non-conference regular season
November 6, 2023*; 6:07 p.m., ESPN+		Bloomsburg	W 72–59	1–0	Binghamton University Events Center (738); Vestal, NY
November 9, 2023*; 6:07 p.m., ESPN+		Siena	L 64–73	1–1	Binghamton University Events Center (786); Vestal, NY
November 12, 2023*; 5:00 p.m., ESPN+		at Loyola (MD)	L 73–77	1–2	Reitz Arena (382); Baltimore, MD
November 18, 2023*; 1:00 p.m., ESPN+		St. Bonaventure	W 73–65	2–2	Binghamton University Events Center (2,164); Vestal, NY
November 21, 2023*; 6:00 p.m., ESPN+		at Navy	L 59–66	2–3	Alumni Hall (329); Annapolis, MD
November 24, 2023*; 1:30 p.m.		vs. Appalachian State; Puerto Rico College Sports Tours Classico	L 57–68	2–4	Coliseo Rubén Rodríguez (100); Bayamón, Puerto Rico
November 25, 2023*; 1:30 p.m.		vs. Furman; Puerto Rico College Sports Tours Classico	L 72–74	2–5	Coliseo Rubén Rodríguez (100); Bayamón, Puerto Rico
November 29, 2023*; 6:07 p.m., ESPN+		Cornell	L 57–58	2–6	Binghamton University Events Center (927); Vestal, NY
December 3, 2023*; 6:00 p.m., ACCNX		at Pittsburgh	L 62–73	2–7	Petersen Events Center (950); Pittsburgh, PA
December 8, 2023*; 6:07 p.m., ESPN+		Canisius	L 64–71	2–8	Binghamton University Events Center (1,027); Vestal, NY
December 17, 2023*; 2:00 p.m., ESPN+		Coppin State	W 64-52	3-8	Binghamton University Events Center (909); Vestal, NY
December 20, 2023*; 1:00 p.m., ESPN+		at Army	W 73-51	4-8	Christl Arena (400); West Point, NY
December 30, 2023*; 1:00 p.m., ESPN+		Chestnut Hill	W 68-54	5-8	Binghamton University Events Center; Vestal, NY
America East regular season
January 4, 2024; 6:07 p.m., ESPN+		UMBC	L 55-70	5-9 (0-1)	Binghamton University Events Center (804); Vestal, NY
January 11, 2024; 11:00 a.m., ESPN+		Bryant	L 51-62	5-10 (0-2)	Binghamton University Events Center (3,429); Vestal, NY
January 13, 2024; 2:00 p.m., ESPN+		Albany	L 58-60	5-11 (0-3)	Binghamton University Events Center (976); Vestal, NY
January 18, 2024; 6:00 p.m., ESPN+		at Vermont	L 38-51	5-12 (0-4)	Patrick Gym (565); Burlington, VT
January 20, 2024; 2:00 p.m., ESPN+		at UMass Lowell	W 70-65	6-12 (1-4)	Costello Athletic Center (269); Lowell, MA
January 25, 2024; 6:07 p.m., ESPN+		New Hampshire	W 73-63	7-12 (2-4)	Binghamton University Events Center (1,303); Vestal, NY
January 27, 2024; 2:00 p.m., ESPN+		Maine	L 56-59	7-13 (2-5)	Binghamton University Events Center (1,118); Vestal, NY
February 1, 2024; 7:00 p.m., ESPN+		at NJIT	W 63-58	8-13 (3-5)	Wellness and Events Center (301); Newark, NJ
February 3, 2024; 2:00 p.m., ESPN+		Vermont	W 66-57	9-13 (4-5)	Binghamton University Events Center (1,507); Vestal, NY
February 8, 2024; 11:00 a.m., ESPN+		at Albany	L 52-60	9-14 (4-6)	Broadview Center; Albany, NY
February 10, 2024; 2:00 p.m., ESPN+		at Bryant	L 51-55	9-15 (4-7)	Chace Athletic Center (401); Smithfield, RI
February 15, 2024; 6:00 p.m., ESPN+		at UMBC	W 52-44	10-15 (5-7)	Chesapeake Employers Insurance Arena; Catonsville, MD
February 17, 2024; 2:00 p.m., ESPN+		NJIT	W 68-48	11-15 (6-7)	Binghamton University Events Center (1,417); Vestal, NY
February 22, 2024; 6:07 p.m., ESPN+		UMass Lowell	W 79-48	12-15 (7-7)	Binghamton University Events Center (1,342); Vestal, NY
February 29, 2024; 6:00 p.m., ESPN+		at Maine	L 51-57	12-16 (7-8)	The Pit at Memorial Gymnasium (701); Orono, ME
March 2, 2024; 1:00 p.m., ESPN+		at New Hampshire	W 65-56	13-16 (8-8)	Lundholm Gym (334); Durham, NH
America East Women's Tournament
March 8, 2024; 6:00 p.m., ESPN+	(5)	at (4) Bryant; Quarterfinals	W 56-51	14-16	Chace Athletic Center (325); Smithfield, RI
March 11, 2024; 6:00 p.m., ESPN+	(5)	at (1) Maine; Semifinals	L 58-64	14-17	Memorial Gymnasium (1,281); Orono, Maine
*Non-conference game. ^{#}Rankings from AP poll. (#) Tournament seedings in parentheses. All times are in Eastern.
