= Kelsey Hogan =

American college basketball coach

Playing career
- 2008–2014: New Hampshire

Coaching career (HC unless noted)
- 2014–2019: New Hampshire (assistant)
- 2019–2020: New Hampshire (associate HC)
- 2020–2024: New Hampshire

Head coaching record
- Overall: 28–77 (.267)

Kelsey Hogan is an American women's basketball coach, and former head coach of the University of New Hampshire women's basketball team.

== Playing career ==
Hogan played high school basketball for four years at Nashua High School North. She was the first player for the team to score 1,000 points in her career, ending with 1,032. She was selected to the All-State team each of her four seasons and earned all-academic team honors in her junior year.

Hogan played four full seasons at New Hampshire. In her freshman year, 2008–09, she only played in three games. In the game against Long Island in November, she suffered a season-ending injury. As a result of this injury she was granted a redshirt season for 2009–10.

Hogan was named to the America East all rookie team and her first full freshman year 2010–11. She was named a co-captain of her team three times over her career. In her senior year, she was named to the America East all-conference first team.

Over her career she scored 1,181 points, which at the time was the 10th best for UNH. She made 62 three-pointers, which placed her number four among all UNH players, and accounted for 375 assists, good enough for third place. Her career free throw percentage of 80.7 was the best ever recorded by a UNH player at that time, and stands currently as the second best ever.

== New Hampshire stats ==
Legend
GP	Games played	GS	Games started	MPG	Minutes per game
FG%	Field goal percentage	3P%	3-point field goal percentage	FT%	Free throw percentage
RPG	Rebounds per game	APG	Assists per game	SPG	Steals per game
BPG	Blocks per game	PPG	Points per game	**Bold**	Career high

Year	Team	GP	Points	FG%	3P%	FT%	RPG	APG	SPG	BPG	PPG
2008–09	New Hampshire	3	24	29.6%	18.2%	75.0%	3.3	3.0	0.3	–	8.0
2010–11	New Hampshire	29	237	35.9%	41.3%	78.8%	2.9	4.1	0.9	0.0	8.2
2011–12	New Hampshire	30	307	38.6%	44.6%	79.6%	3.8	2.5	1.0	0.1	10.2
2012–13	New Hampshire	23	226	39.4%	33.3%	82.7%	3.9	3.2	0.5	0.0	9.8
2013–14	New Hampshire	31	387	41.3%	37.1%	82.1%	3.0	3.2	0.8	0.1	12.5
Career		116	1181	38.8%	38.6%	80.7%	3.4	3.2	0.8	0.1	10.2

== Coaching career ==
Hogan joined Maureen Magarity's staff as an assistant coach shortly after her graduation in May 2014. She continued as an assistant coach until being named associate head coach in 2019. When Magarity was named the new head coach for Holy Cross, New Hampshire promoted Hogan to the position of head coach.

On March 27, 2024, Hogan resigned as head coach after four season and a combined record of 28–77 (.267).

== Head coaching record ==
=== NCAA DI ===
Statistics overview
Season	Team	Overall	Conference	Standing	Postseason
New Hampshire Wildcats (America East Conference) (2020–2024)
2020–21	New Hampshire	5–15	5–11	6th	
2021–22	New Hampshire	7–21	4–12	8th	
2022–23	New Hampshire	7–21	2–14	9th	
2023–24	New Hampshire	9–20	3–13	9th	
New Hampshire:		28–77 (.267)	14–50 (.219)		
Total:		28–77 (.267)			
National champion Postseason invitational champion Conference regular season champion Conference regular season and conference tournament champion Division regular season champion Division regular season and conference tournament champion Conference tournament champion
