= Skowhegan Area High School =

Location
- 61 Academy Circle; Skowhegan, Maine 04976; United States
- Coordinates: 44.7505°N 69.7288°W

Information
- School type: Public, high school
- Founded: 1814
- Oversight: Maine School Administrative District 54
- Superintendent: Jon Moody
- Principal: Jason Bellerose
- Teaching staff: 51.80 (FTE)
- Grades: 9–12
- Enrollment: 702 (2023–2024)
- Student to teacher ratio: 13.55
- Language: English
- Campus: Rural
- Colors: Black, Orange, and White
- Mascot: River Hawk
- Team name: River Hawks
- Newspaper: River Hawk Review
- Yearbook: Lever
- Feeder schools: Skowhegan Area Middle School
- Website: https://sahs.msad54.org/

Skowhegan Area High School is a public high school in Skowhegan, Maine, United States. It is part of Maine School Administrative District 54 which includes the towns of Skowhegan, Canaan, Mercer, Smithfield, Cornville, and Norridgewock.

== Notable alumni ==
- Abner Coburn, 30th Governor of Maine (1863–64)
- Susan Clark (sailor)
- Brad Farrin, state legislator
- Robert Nutting (politician), state legislator
- Margaret Chase Smith, American politician, first woman to serve in both the United States House of Representatives and United States Senate

== Notable faculty ==
- Marti Stevens (educator)
- Chandler Woodcock, state legislator
