= Robert Nutting =

American politician (born 1947)

Bob Nutting

100th Speaker of the Maine House of Representatives
- In office December 6, 2010 – December 3, 2012
- Preceded by: Hannah Pingree
- Succeeded by: Mark Eves

Member of the Maine House of Representatives from the 78th district
- In office December 3, 2008 – December 2016
- Preceded by: Jill Conover
- Succeeded by: Catherine Nadeau
- In office December 1, 2004 – December 6, 2006
- Preceded by: Janet Mills
- Succeeded by: Jill Conover

Personal details
- Born: March 18, 1947 (age 79) Maine, U.S.
- Party: Republican
- Spouse: Wendy Libby (m. 1968)
- Education: Massachusetts College of Pharmacy
- Profession: Pharmacist

Robert Nutting (born 1947), also known as Bob Nutting, is a Republican politician from Maine who served six terms in the Maine House of Representatives. He re-joined the House after a two-year absence in 2008 and was elected speaker by the incoming Republican majority following the 2010 election, becoming the first, and as of 2026, the only Maine House Speaker from the Republican Party since 1974.

Nutting married Wendy Libby in 1968. They have three children and five grandchildren.

Nutting was born in Maine. His father was a roofer and plumber and his mother was a nurse. He has two older siblings, a sister and a brother, who are both retired teachers. He graduated from Skowhegan Area High School in 1965 and attained a Bachelor of Science in Pharmacy at the Massachusetts College of Pharmacy in 1970.

From 1972 to 2003 Nutting owned and operated True's Pharmacy in Oakland. His pharmacy was forced to close following a billing dispute with the state Department of Human Services in which they were accused of over-billing MaineCare, the state's version of Medicaid, for up to $2.3 million. Nutting has received several industry awards and honors and served on the boards of directors of area business groups as well as having formerly been President of the Maine Pharmacy Association. DHHS accused True's Pharmacy of overcharging on bed liners, latex gloves and adult diapers.

Nutting left the Speakership on December 3, 2012, after the Democrats retook the House majority.
