= 2023–24 Boston College Eagles women's basketball team =

Intercollegiate basketball season

2023–24 Boston College Eagles women's basketball
- Conference: Atlantic Coast Conference
- Record: 14–19 (5–13 ACC)
- Head coach: Joanna Bernabei-McNamee (6th season)
- Assistant coaches: Sean Ehlbeck; Chris Meadows Sr.; Shelby Boyle
- Home arena: Conte Forum

2023–24 ACC women's basketball standings
	Conf.				Overall
Team	W		L	PCT	W		L	PCT
No. 18 Virginia Tech	14	–	4	.778	25	–	8	.758
No. 4 NC State	13	–	5	.722	31	–	7	.816
No. 20 Syracuse	13	–	5	.722	24	–	8	.750
No. 11 Notre Dame †	13	–	5	.722	28	–	7	.800
Louisville	12	–	6	.667	24	–	10	.706
Florida State	12	–	6	.667	23	–	11	.676
No. 17 Duke	11	–	7	.611	22	–	12	.647
North Carolina	11	–	7	.611	20	–	13	.606
Miami (FL)	8	–	10	.444	19	–	12	.613
Georgia Tech	7	–	11	.389	17	–	16	.515
Virginia	7	–	11	.389	16	–	16	.500
Clemson	5	–	13	.278	12	–	19	.387
Boston College	5	–	13	.278	14	–	19	.424
Wake Forest	2	–	16	.111	7	–	25	.219
Pittsburgh	2	–	16	.111	8	–	24	.250
† 2024 ACC tournament winner Rankings from AP poll

The 2023–24 Boston College Eagles women's basketball team represented Boston College during the 2023–24 NCAA Division I women's basketball season. The Eagles were led by sixth-year head coach Joanna Bernabei-McNamee. They played their home games at the Conte Forum and were members of the Atlantic Coast Conference.

The Eagles started off the season alternating wins and losses before losing three straight games in early season tournaments. They finished their non-conference schedule with five straight wins to finish 8–5. They started their ACC regular season schedule 3–3. However, they then lost their next ten games before winning their last two conference games. The Eagles finished the season 14–19 overall and 5–13 in ACC play to finish in a tie for twelfth place. As the thirteenth seed in the ACC tournament, they defeated twelfth seed Clemson in the first round before losing to fifth seed Louisville in the second round. They were not invited to the NCAA tournament or the WBIT.

== Previous season ==
The Eagles finished the season 16–17 overall and 5–13 in ACC play to finish in a tie for eleventh place. As the eleventh seed in the ACC tournament, they defeated Georgia Tech in the first round before losing to Miami in the second round. They were not invited to the NCAA tournament or WNIT.

== Off-season ==
=== Departures ===
Departures
Name	Number	Pos.	Height	Year	Hometown	Reason for departure
Maria Gakdeng	5	F/C	6'3"	Sophomore	Lanham, Maryland	Transferred to North Carolina
Taina Mair	20	G	5'9"	Freshman	Boston, Massachusetts	Transferred to Duke
Ally Carman	43	C	6'5"	Freshman	Barnegat, New Jersey	Transferred to Iona
Akunna Konkwo	44	C	6'2"	(redshirt) Sophomore	Alexandria, Virginia	Graduated

=== Incoming transfers ===
Incoming transfers
Name	Number	Pos.	Height	Year	Hometown	Previous school
Teya Sidberry	32	F	6'1"	Sophomore	Salt Lake City, Utah	Utah
Savannah Samuel	33	G	6'1"	Junior	Woodstock, Georgia	West Virginia

=== Recruiting class ===
College recruiting
Name	Hometown	School	Height	Weight	Commit date
Nene Ndiaye; F	Saly, Senegal	Orangewood Academy	6 ft 1 in (1.85 m)	N/A	
Nene Ndiaye; F	Recruit ratings: No ratings found				
JaKayla Thompson; G	Louisville, Kentucky	duPont Manual	5 ft 8 in (1.73 m)	N/A	
JaKayla Thompson; G	Recruit ratings: No ratings found				
Jayda Johnson; G	West Haven, Connecticut	Hamden	6 ft 0 in (1.83 m)	N/A	
Jayda Johnson; G	Recruit ratings: No ratings found				
Lili Krasovec; F	Budapest, Hungary	Winston-Salem Christian	6 ft 3 in (1.91 m)	N/A	
Lili Krasovec; F	Recruit ratings: No ratings found				
Overall recruit ranking:
Note: In many cases, Scout, Rivals, 247Sports, On3, and ESPN may conflict in their listings of height and weight.; In these cases, the average was taken. ESPN grades are on a 100-point scale.; Sources:

== Roster ==
2023–24 Boston College Eagles women's basketball team
Players
Coaches

Pos.	#	Name	Height	Year	Previous school	Hometown
F	0	Nene Ndiaye	6 ft 1 in (1.85 m)	Fr	Orangewood Academy	Saly, Senegal
G	1	JaKayla Thompson	5 ft 8 in (1.73 m)	Fr	duPont Manual	Louisville, KY
G	2	Kaylah Ivey	5 ft 8 in (1.73 m)	RS Jr	Riverdale Baptist School	Forestville, MD
G	3	Ava McGee	5 ft 10 in (1.78 m)	So	Maret	Washington, D.C.
G	4	JoJo Lacey	6 ft 1 in (1.85 m)	Sr	Westtown School	Douglassville, PA
G	5	Jayda Johnson	6 ft 0 in (1.83 m)	Fr	Hamden	West Haven, CT
F	12	Ally Van Timmeren	6 ft 2 in (1.88 m)	Jr	Jenison	Allendale, MI
G	14	Kayla Lezama	5 ft 11 in (1.8 m)	So	Noble and Greenough School	Boston, MA
F	16	Lili Krasovec	6 ft 3 in (1.91 m)	Fr	Winston-Salem Christian	Budapest, Hungary
G	21	Andrea Daley	6 ft 0 in (1.83 m)	Jr	Miami Country Day	Miami, FL
G	24	Dontavia Waggoner	6 ft 0 in (1.83 m)	Sr	The Ensworth School	Nashville, TN
G	30	T'Yana Todd	6 ft 0 in (1.83 m)	So	IMG Academy	Vaughan, Canada
F	32	Teya Sidberry	6 ft 1 in (1.85 m)	So	Judge Memorial; Utah	Salt Lake City, UT
G	33	Savannah Samuel	6 ft 1 in (1.85 m)	RS Jr	St. Francis; West Virginia	Woodstock, GA

Head coach

- Joanna Bernabei-McNamee (West Liberty)

Assistant coach(es)

- Sean Ehlbeck (Maryland)
- Chris Meadows Sr. (St. Bonaventure)
- Shelby Boyle (Transylvania University)

Legend

- (C) Team captain
- (S) Suspended
- (I) Ineligible
- (W) Walk-on
- Injured
- Current redshirt

Roster
Last update: October 27, 2023

== Schedule ==
Date time, TV	Rank^{#}	Opponent^{#}	Result	Record	Site (attendance) city, state
Non-conference regular season
November 6, 2023*; 5:00 p.m., ACCNX		Holy Cross	W 66–61	1–0	Conte Forum (537); Chestnut Hill, MA
November 9, 2023*; 6:00 p.m., ACCNX		Harvard	L 59–66	1–1	Conte Forum (617); Chestnut Hill, MA
November 12, 2023*; 2:00 p.m., ACCNX		Northeastern	W 67–58	2–1	Conte Forum (817); Chestnut Hill, MA
November 16, 2023*; 7:00 p.m., BTN+		at No. 13 Ohio State	L 66–88	2–2	Value City Arena (4,523); Columbus, OH
November 19, 2023*; 2:00 p.m., FloSports		at Providence	W 71–56	3–2	Alumni Hall (847); Providence, RI
November 24, 2023*; 4:30 p.m.		vs. Marquette; Fort Myers Tip-Off	L 65–73	3–3	Suncoast Credit Union Arena (591); Fort Myers, FL
November 25, 2023*; 7:30 p.m.		vs. Wisconsin; Fort Myers Tip-Off	L 72–82	3–4	Suncoast Credit Union Arena (397); Fort Myers, FL
November 30, 2023*; 7:00 p.m., SECN		at Kentucky; ACC–SEC Challenge	L 81–83	3–4	Memorial Coliseum (910); Lexington, KY
December 3, 2023*; 1:00 p.m., ACCNX		UMass Lowell	W 91–53	4–5	Conte Forum (432); Chestnut Hill, MA
December 6, 2023*; 7:00 p.m., ACCNX		UMass	W 95–57	5–5	Conte Forum (536); Chestnut Hill, MA
December 10, 2023*; 12:00 p.m., ACCNX		Siena	W 88–59	6–5	Conte Forum (733); Chestnut Hill, MA
December 12, 2023*; 11:00 a.m., ACCNX		Stonehill	W 101–37	7–5	Conte Forum (3,630); Chestnut Hill, MA
December 20, 2023*; 7:00 p.m., ACCNX		Bryant	W 94–57	8–5	Conte Forum (633); Chestnut Hill, MA
ACC regular season
December 31, 2023; 2:00 p.m., ACCNX		at Duke	L 81–86	8–6 (0–1)	Cameron Indoor Stadium (1,898); Durham, NC
January 4, 2024; 7:00 p.m., ACCNX		Miami (FL)	W 70–64	9–6 (1–1)	Conte Forum (819); Chestnut Hill, MA
January 7, 2024; 7:00 p.m., ACCN		at No. 25 Syracuse	L 64–71	9–7 (1–2)	JMA Wireless Dome (1,811); Syracuse, NY
January 11, 2024; 7:00 p.m., ACCNX		at No. 18 Notre Dame	L 48–98	9–8 (1–3)	Purcell Pavilion (4,657); Notre Dame, IN
January 14, 2024; 12:00 p.m., ACCN		Pittsburgh	W 84–71 ^{OT}	10–8 (2–3)	Conte Forum (1,126); Chestnut Hill, MA
January 18, 2024; 7:00 p.m., ACCNX		Wake Forest	W 68–65	11–8 (3–3)	Conte Forum (803); Chestnut Hill, MA
January 21, 2024; 2:00 p.m., ACCNX		at Georgia Tech	L 54–69	11–9 (3–4)	McCamish Pavilion (2,185); Atlanta, GA
January 25, 2024; 7:00 p.m., ACCNX		at No. 18 Louisville	L 60–88	11–10 (3–5)	KFC Yum! Center (7,606); Louisville, KY
January 28, 2024; 2:00 p.m., ACCNX		No. 7 NC State	L 61–82	11–11 (3–6)	Conte Forum (2,180); Chestnut Hill, MA
February 1, 2024; 7:00 p.m., ACCNX		at Clemson	L 55–65	11–12 (3–7)	Littlejohn Coliseum (872); Clemson, SC
February 4, 2024; 12:00 p.m., ACCN		No. 21 Syracuse	L 63–75	11–13 (3–8)	Conte Forum (1,836); Chestnut Hill, MA
February 8, 2024; 6:00 p.m., ACCN		Virginia	L 66–73	11–14 (3–9)	Conte Forum (756); Chestnut Hill, MA
February 11, 2024; 1:00 p.m., ACCNX		at No. 16 Virginia Tech	L 63–74	11–15 (3–10)	Cassell Coliseum (8,925); Blacksburg, VA
February 15, 2024; 7:00 p.m., ACCNX		No. 18 Louisville	L 67–69	11–16 (3–11)	Conte Forum (937); Chestnut Hill, MA
February 22, 2024; 6:00 p.m., ACCNX		at Florida State	L 71–84	11–17 (3–12)	Donald L. Tucker Center (1,744); Tallahassee, FL
February 25, 2024; 12:00 p.m., ACCN		No. 19 Notre Dame	L 55–79	11–18 (3–13)	Conte Forum (3,612); Chestnut Hill, MA
February 29, 2024; 7:00 p.m., ACCNX		North Carolina	W 78–74	12–18 (4–13)	Conte Forum (1,621); Chestnut Hill, MA
March 3, 2024; 12:00 p.m., ACCN		at Pittsburgh	W 84–58	13–18 (5–13)	Peterson Events Center (1,744); Pittsburgh, PA
ACC Women's Tournament
March 6, 2024; 1:00 p.m., ACCN	(13)	vs. (12) Clemson; First Round	W 85–72	14–18	Greensboro Coliseum (6,322); Greensboro, NC
March 7, 2024; 11:00 a.m., ACCN	(13)	vs. (5) No. 24 Louisville; Second Round	L 55–58	14–19	Greensboro Coliseum (10,823); Greensboro, NC
*Non-conference game. ^{#}Rankings from AP Poll. (#) Tournament seedings in parentheses. All times are in Eastern.

== Rankings ==
+ Regular season polls	Poll	Pre- season	Week 2	Week 3	Week 4	Week 5	Week 6	Week 7	Week 8	Week 9	Week 10	Week 11	Week 12	Week 13	Week 14	Week 15	Week 16	Week 17	Week 18	Week 19	Week 20	Final
AP	NR	NR	NR	NR	NR	NR	NR	NR	NR	NR	NR	NR	NR	NR	NR	NR	NR	NR	NR	NR	NR	
Coaches	NR	NR	NR	NR	NR	NR	NR	NR	NR	NR	NR	NR	NR	NR	NR	NR	NR	NR	NR	NR	NR	

Legend
	Increase in ranking
	Decrease in ranking
	Not ranked in previous week
(RV)	Received votes
(NR)	Not ranked
