= Susan Clark (sailor) =

Susan Clark was the first woman to sail as captain for SeaRiver Maritime Inc., the first woman to join Portland’s Marine Society (in 2005), and the first female harbor pilot in Maine. She died of cancer in 2012 at age 48, and Maine Maritime Academy named a navigation training ship in her honor in 2013, which was the first time the academy named such a ship for a woman.

Clark was valedictorian and class president at Skowhegan Area High School. She graduated from Maine Maritime Academy first in her class in 1985 and served as a trustee from 2002 to 2007. She also attended Seton Hall and graduated from the University Maine School of Law in 1992. She received her pilot's license in 2001 and worked for Portland Pilots Inc. since then, piloting ships into Boston Harbor.
