= Marti Stevens (educator) =

American educator and stage director (c. 1939–1993)

- Stevens in 1987
- Born: c. 1939; Chicago, Illinois
- Died: May 8, 1993 (aged 54); Portland, Maine
- Occupations: Educator, theatre director
- Years active: 1969–1993
- Awards: Maine Women's Hall of Fame, 1996

Marti Stevens (c. 1939 – May 8, 1993) was an American educator and theater director. Born in Chicago, she spent 10 years as a professional director and actress on off-Broadway stages in New York City before relocating to the rural community of Cornville, Maine. She was posthumously inducted into the Maine Women's Hall of Fame in 1996.

Stevens developed adult education and literacy programs for high-school dropouts, teen parents, disabled people, prison inmates, and seniors. She also taught composition at the university level. She created and directed an amateur theatre group, the Cornville Players, from 1974 to 1993, and founded an improvisational theatre group called Teens 'N Theater for high school students.

== Early life and education ==
Marti Stevens was born and raised in South Side, Chicago. Her parents were both musicians. She had one sister. She earned her bachelor's degree in journalism at the University of Missouri and her master's degree in education at City College of New York.

== Career ==
=== Off-Broadway ===
In 1959 she moved to New York City, where she studied acting with professional coaches Uta Hagen and Gene Frankel. Her efforts to pursue a career in the "avant-garde theater of the 1960s" were disappointing. After ten years of work as an off-Broadway director, occasional acting gigs, and work as a teacher and secretary, she gave up big-city life and moved to Cornville, Maine, in 1969.

=== Education ===
Less than a week after her arrival, she was seriously injured in an automobile accident. Following her release from the hospital, she went on welfare, and her caseworker set her up as a job retraining consultant. She also began a tutoring service for high-school dropouts to help them attain their high school diploma. Later she launched the Crossroads Learning Center in Skowhegan to provide living accommodations and alternative education for teenage mothers. This center became part of the school district in 1987. It was renamed the Marti Stevens Learning Center after her death in 1993 and has evolved into a coeducational alternative education program. Stevens also co-developed the Training for Tomorrow program for displaced homemakers with the Maine Centers for Women, Work and Community.

Stevens founded and served as director of the Somerset County Basic Skills Program from the late 1970s until her death in 1993. In this capacity, she arranged for one-on-one and private group tutoring for adults hampered by low levels of literacy, including high school dropouts, disabled people, and seniors. She also developed training modules for a Literacy Advocacy Program. She was a partner and president of Educational Skills, Inc., of Skowhegan, which brought computer literacy courses to prison inmates.

From 1981 to 1993 she taught composition at the University of Maine at Farmington.

=== Theatre director ===
In 1973 she was asked by a Cornville school principal to direct the fifth-grade play and, desiring to give back to her new community, agreed. She suggested that the play be staged in the town hall, and worked to upgrade the building, which had been slated for demolition. The play was a success, and after directing it a second year, the Selectmen voted not to destroy the hall but to refurbish it. In 1974 Stevens founded an amateur theatre group called the Cornville Players, composed of residents between the ages of 14 and 60 from Cornville, Skowhegan, and Athens, and staged dozens of plays in the Cornville Town Hall. In the group's early years, the Cornville Junior Players acted in five plays. A touring company called the Cornville Touring Players performed 14 one-act plays around Maine. By its tenth anniversary in 1984, the Cornville Players had produced "34 full-scale musicals, comedies and dramas involving more than 300 people".

In 1985 the Cornville Players were invited to move into the Lakewood Theater in Madison. Stevens became artistic director of the Lakewood Theater for eight years, and also served as vice president of Curtain Up Enterprises, the non-profit operating company of the Lakewood Theater. Curtain Up received a grant from the Maine State Council on Arts and Humanities in early 1986 which enabled it to subsidize concerts and plays for children, and also to form its own children's theatre group, the Magic Machine.

Around 1982 Stevens created an improvisational theatre group for the students of Skowhegan Area High School. Teens 'N Theatre was designed as an alternative to formal lectures on family planning. The troupe improvised skits on topics such as substance abuse, sexual abuse, domestic violence, and teen suicide for students in other schools, and afterwards engaged the audience in question-and-answer sessions.

In her work as director of the Somerset County Basic Skills Program, Stevens founded the Maine Literacy Theater in 1985. After her death, this theatre group was renamed the Marti Stevens Interactive Improvisational Theater. Based in Falmouth, the theatre group has evolved into a management training tool, as actors improvise the challenges and conflicts faced by audience members in their line of work, be it education, business, or non-profits, and engage the audience in problem-solving.

== Other activities ==
As a single woman living alone on a 100 acres (40 ha) farm, Stevens was an anomaly in her rural town. Her holdings included "a steer, two cows, two horses, eight goats, a pair of ewes, laying hens, two dogs and nine cats". In 1972 a picture of her, the former "city girl", straddling an ornery goat in order to milk it was snapped by an Associated Press reporter and reprinted by newspapers around the country. In 1982 the Bangor Daily News reported that she had participated in the first "adopt a burro" transaction in the area. She also had a collection of face masks from Africa, Asia, Indonesia, United States, Canada, and Central America.

Stevens was appointed plumbing inspector for Cornville, Starks, and Athens.

== Memberships ==
Stevens served on the board of directors of the Kennebec Valley Community Action Program, the North Kennebec Regional Planning Commission, and the Western Maine Mountain Alliance.

== Personal ==
Stevens died suddenly on May 8, 1993, aged 54. Police speculated that she had succumbed to an asthma attack while driving on the Maine Turnpike in Portland.

She was posthumously inducted into the Maine Women's Hall of Fame in 1996.
