= Cornville, Maine =

Town in Maine, United States

- Town
- Logo

- Location within Maine Location within the United States
- Coordinates: 44°52′27″N 69°41′50″W
- Country: United States
- State: Maine
- County: Somerset

Area
  - Total: 40.94 sq mi (106.03 km^{2})
  - Land: 40.73 sq mi (105.49 km^{2})
  - Water: 0.21 sq mi (0.54 km^{2})
- Elevation: 436 ft (133 m)

Population (2020)
  - Total: 1,317
  - Density: 32/sq mi (12.5/km^{2})
- Time zone: UTC-5 (Eastern (EST))
  - Summer (DST): UTC-4 (EDT)
- ZIP code: 04976
- Area code: 207
- FIPS code: 23-14555
- GNIS feature ID: 579028
- Website: townofcornville.com

Cornville is a town in Somerset County, Maine, United States. The population was 1,317 at the 2020 census.

== History ==
Settled in 1794, Cornville was incorporated on February 24, 1798, as the 116th town in Maine.

== Geography ==
According to the United States Census Bureau, the town has a total area of 40.94 square miles (106.03 km^{2}), of which 40.73 square miles (105.49 km^{2}) is land and 0.21 square miles (0.54 km^{2}) is water.

== Demographics ==
Historical population
Census	Pop.	Note	%±
1800	204		—
1810	504		147.1%
1820	652		29.4%
1830	1,104		69.3%
1840	1,140		3.3%
1850	1,260		10.5%
1860	1,141		−9.4%
1870	959		−16.0%
1880	932		−2.8%
1890	785		−15.8%
1900	689		−12.2%
1910	720		4.5%
1920	637		−11.5%
1930	569		−10.7%
1940	626		10.0%
1950	563		−10.1%
1960	585		3.9%
1970	623		6.5%
1980	838		34.5%
1990	1,008		20.3%
2000	1,208		19.8%
2010	1,314		8.8%
2020	1,317		0.2%
U.S. Decennial Census

=== 2010 census ===
As of the census of 2010, there were 1,314 people, 531 households, and 382 families living in the town. The population density was 32.3 inhabitants per square mile (12.5/km^{2}). There were 624 housing units at an average density of 15.3 per square mile (5.9/km^{2}). The racial makeup of the town was 98.1% White, 0.9% African American, 0.1% Native American, 0.2% Asian, 0.1% from other races, and 0.6% from two or more races. Hispanic or Latino of any race were 0.5% of the population.

There were 531 households, of which 29.6% had children under the age of 18 living with them, 61.2% were married couples living together, 6.8% had a female householder with no husband present, 4.0% had a male householder with no wife present, and 28.1% were non-families. 19.4% of all households were made up of individuals, and 5.6% had someone living alone who was 65 years of age or older. The average household size was 2.46 and the average family size was 2.80.

The median age in the town was 43.1 years. 22.2% of residents were under the age of 18; 5.1% were between the ages of 18 and 24; 25.6% were from 25 to 44; 33.9% were from 45 to 64; and 13.2% were 65 years of age or older. The gender makeup of the town was 49.7% male and 50.3% female.

=== 2000 census ===
As of the census of 2000, there were 1,208 people, 449 households, and 352 families living in the town. The population density was 29.9 inhabitants per square mile (11.5/km^{2}). There were 515 housing units at an average density of 12.7 per square mile (4.9/km^{2}). The racial makeup of the town was 99.01% White, 0.08% African American, 0.17% Native American, 0.25% Asian, and 0.50% from two or more races. Hispanic or Latino of any race were 0.33% of the population.

There were 449 households, out of which 34.3% had children under the age of 18 living with them, 67.5% were married couples living together, 6.7% had a female householder with no husband present, and 21.6% were non-families. 15.1% of all households were made up of individuals, and 6.9% had someone living alone who was 65 years of age or older. The average household size was 2.69 and the average family size was 2.97.

In the town, the population was spread out, with 25.2% under the age of 18, 7.6% from 18 to 24, 28.0% from 25 to 44, 27.8% from 45 to 64, and 11.3% who were 65 years of age or older. The median age was 39 years. For every 100 females, there were 97.4 males. For every 100 females age 18 and over, there were 97.6 males.

The median income for a household in the town was $38,015, and the median income for a family was $41,875. Males had a median income of $30,543 versus $22,083 for females. The per capita income for the town was $16,184. About 8.4% of families and 11.5% of the population were below the poverty line, including 17.5% of those under age 18 and 11.3% of those age 65 or over.

== Notable people ==
- Luther Elkins (May 26, 1809 – December 13, 1887), politician and pioneer.
- Peter Mills, Republican politician, former Maine senator.
- Marti Stevens, (c. 1939–1993) community educator and founding director of the Cornville Players
