= Memorial Gymnasium (University of Maine) =

Multipurpose arena in Orono, Maine

- The Pit
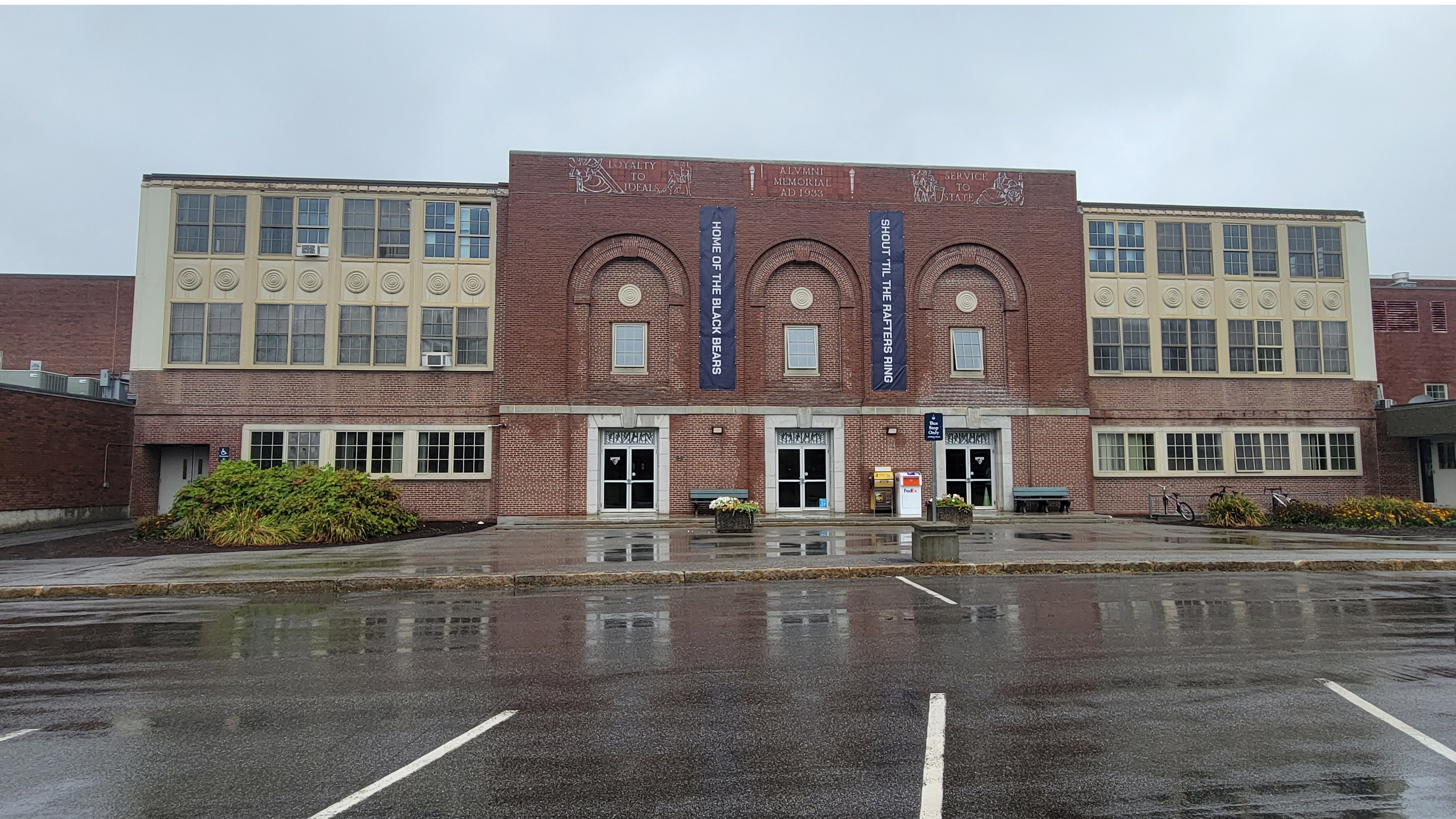
- South façade, Alumni Memorial Gymnasium, University of Maine, Orono
- Interactive map of Memorial Gymnasium
- Full name: Alumni Memorial Gymnasium and Field House
- Location: 18 Gym Dr, Orono, Maine
- Coordinates: 44°54′13″N 68°40′12″W
- Capacity: 1,350 (present); 3,100 (after renovations, 2014)

Construction
- Built: 1935

Memorial Gym, nicknamed "The Pit", is a 3,100-seat multipurpose arena in Orono, Maine. It is home to the University of Maine Black Bears men's and women's basketball teams. Maine played 10 men's and women's basketball games during 2011–12 at Memorial Gym. The men’s team has held a total of eight games at Memorial Gym since 2003–04. The Gym was home to Black Bears Basketball from 1935 to 1989, before moving some games to Bangor Auditorium. In 2023–24, both the men's and women's teams played the majority of their games at Memorial Gym.

Maine Athletic Director Steve Abbott said, “Among concerns about using 'The Pit' is the potential for not being able to accommodate more than the estimated capacity crowd of 1,300.” In 2012, renovations began to the arena. New scoreboards and shot clocks were installed, and seats were added after the 2012–13 season. Abbott said the upgrades in 2012 were expected to cost $150,000, but UMaine will be able to use some of the equipment even after the renovation project is completed. Once the funding for the proposed project is in place, UMaine will begin retrofitting the building to make it the full-time home of Black Bear basketball. “Our goal in 2013 is to renovate 'The Pit' and have it be our primary home court,” Abbott said. “We want to start taking those steps to making it a reality.” In 2014, it will become the full-time home of Black Bear basketball, replacing Alfond Arena. The total cost of the renovations will be approximately $12.7 million, which will include some classrooms, an academic athletic center, a new training facility, new heating/HVAC ventilation, and new player locker rooms.
