= 2023–24 Saint Peter's Peacocks women's basketball team =

American college basketball season

2023–24 Saint Peter's Peacocks women's basketball
- Conference: Metro Atlantic Athletic Conference
- Record: 7–23 (4–15 MAAC)
- Head coach: Jennifer Leedham (2nd season)
- Associate head coach: David Jollon
- Assistant coaches: Johannah Leedham-Warner; Elena Pulanco; Tay Hughes
- Home arena: Run Baby Run Arena

2023–24 MAAC women's basketball standings
	Conf.				Overall
Team	W		L	PCT	W		L	PCT
Fairfield †	20	–	0	1.000	31	–	2	.939
Niagara	15	–	5	.750	21	–	14	.600
Siena	14	–	6	.700	18	–	12	.600
Manhattan	11	–	9	.550	18	–	12	.600
Canisius	11	–	9	.550	17	–	14	.548
Mount St. Mary's	10	–	10	.500	14	–	17	.452
Quinnipiac	9	–	11	.450	13	–	18	.419
Rider	6	–	14	.300	10	–	21	.323
Iona	6	–	14	.300	11	–	19	.367
Saint Peter's	4	–	16	.200	7	–	23	.233
Marist	4	–	16	.200	6	–	25	.194
† 2024 MAAC tournament winner

The 2023–24 Saint Peter's Peacocks women's basketball team represented Saint Peter's University during the 2023–24 NCAA Division I women's basketball season. The Peacocks, led by second-year head coach Jennifer Leedham, played their home games at the Run Baby Run Arena in Jersey City, New Jersey as members of the Metro Atlantic Athletic Conference (MAAC).

The Peacocks finished the season 7–23, 4–16 in MAAC play, to finish in a tie for last place. They were defeated by Quinnipiac in the first round of the MAAC tournament.

== Previous season ==
The Peacocks finished the 2022–23 season 0–30, 0–20 in MAAC play, to finish in last (eleventh) place. In the MAAC tournament, they were defeated by Manhattan in the first round.

== Roster ==
2023–24 Saint Peter's Peacocks women's basketball team
Players
Coaches

Pos.	#	Name	Height	Year	Previous school	Hometown
G	1	Rachel Kuhl	5 ft 7 in (1.7 m)	Sr	Old Bridge High School	Old Bridge, NJ
G	3	Jada Leonard	5 ft 8 in (1.73 m)	So	Monsignor Scanlan High School	The Bronx, NY
G	4	Tiara Bellamy	5 ft 7 in (1.7 m)	So	Immaculate Conception High School	Plainfield, NJ
G	5	Maya Hyacienth	5 ft 10 in (1.78 m)	GS	Rider	Nottingham, England
G	11	Mikia Keith	5 ft 3 in (1.6 m)	GS	SIU Edwardsville	Indianapolis, IN
PG	12	Emily O'Connell	5 ft 7 in (1.7 m)	Fr	City of London Academy	London, England
C	14	Carys Roy	6 ft 3 in (1.91 m)	Fr	Cowbridge Comprehensive School	Cowbridge, Wales
F	15	Layla Laws	6 ft 1 in (1.85 m)	Jr	Saint Francis (PA)	Pine Beach, NJ
PG	20	Reilly Sunday	5 ft 9 in (1.75 m)	So	Moon Area High School	Moon Township, PA
F	21	Maria Fux	6 ft 0 in (1.83 m)	GS	NJIT	Rosario, Argentina
F	22	Jada Williams	6 ft 1 in (1.85 m)	Jr	Temple	Williamstown, NJ
G	23	Lara Aguzzi	5 ft 11 in (1.8 m)	Fr	Newton North High School	Newton, MA
F	44	Fatmata Janneh	6 ft 1 in (1.85 m)	Fr	Barking Abbey Sixth Form	London, England

Head coach

- Jennifer Leedham (Franklin Pierce)

Assistant coach(es)

- David Jollon (Thomas Edison State)
- Johannah Leedham-Warner (Franklin Pierce)
- Elena Pulanco (Wofford)
- Tay Hughes (Saint Peter's)

Legend

- (C) Team captain
- (S) Suspended
- (I) Ineligible
- (W) Walk-on
- Injured
- Current redshirt

Roster
Last update: February 19, 2024

== Schedule and results ==
Date time, TV	Rank^{#}	Opponent^{#}	Result	Record	Site (attendance) city, state
Regular season
November 6, 2023*; 6:00 p.m., ESPN+		at UMass	L 44–56	0–1	Mullins Center (1,024); Amherst, MA
November 13, 2023*; 7:00 p.m., ESPN+		Central Connecticut	W 61–57	1–1	Run Baby Run Arena (385); Jersey City, NJ
November 15, 2023*; 12:00 p.m., B1G+		at Illinois	L 33–103	1–2	State Farm Center (11,563); Champaign, IL
November 19, 2023*; 2:00 p.m., FloHoops		at Marquette	L 36–96	1–3	Al McGuire Center (1,032); Milwaukee, WI
November 28, 2023*; 7:00 p.m., ESPN+		at Fordham	L 46–80	1–4	Rose Hill Gymnasium (187); The Bronx, NY
November 30, 2023*; 7:00 p.m., NEC Front Row		at LIU	W 63–54	2–4	Steinberg Wellness Center (89); Brooklyn, NY
December 6, 2023*; 7:00 p.m., ESPN+		Wagner	L 67–69	2–5	Run Baby Run Arena (394); Jersey City, NJ
December 12, 2023*; 7:00 p.m., ESPN+		at NJIT	L 47–66	2–6	Wellness and Events Center (250); Newark, NJ
December 16, 2023; 2:00 p.m., ESPN+		Marist	W 51–42	3–6 (1–0)	Run Baby Run Arena (193); Jersey City, NJ
December 18, 2023; 7:00 p.m., ESPN+		Niagara	L 57–74	3–7 (1–1)	Run Baby Run Arena (330); Jersey City, NJ
December 21, 2023*; 2:00 p.m., FloHoops		at Hampton	W 69–58	4–7	Hampton Convocation Center (429); Hampton, VA
January 4, 2024; 11:00 a.m., ESPN+		at Quinnipiac	L 39–50	4–8 (1–2)	M&T Bank Arena (2,476); Hamden, CT
January 6, 2024; 2:00 p.m., ESPN+		at Siena	L 45–64	4–9 (1–3)	UHY Center (455); Loudonville, NY
January 11, 2024; 7:00 p.m., ESPN+		Canisius	L 44–59	4–10 (1–4)	Run Baby Run Arena (257); Jersey City, NJ
January 13, 2024; 2:00 p.m., ESPN+		at Manhattan	L 37–41	4–11 (1–5)	Draddy Gymnasium (234); Riverdale, NY
January 18, 2024; 11:00 a.m., ESPN+		at Iona	L 62–68	4–12 (1–6)	Hynes Athletics Center (2,576); New Rochelle, NY
January 25, 2024; 1:00 p.m., ESPN+		Mount St. Mary's	L 49–52	4–13 (1–7)	Run Baby Run Arena (–); Jersey City, NJ
January 27, 2024; 2:00 p.m., ESPN+		Rider	W 68–58	5–13 (2–7)	Run Baby Run Arena (–); Jersey City, NJ
February 1, 2024; 6:00 p.m., ESPN+		at Niagara	L 51–85	5–14 (2–8)	Gallagher Center (312); Lewiston, NY
February 3, 2024; 1:00 p.m., ESPN+		at Canisius	L 51–85	5–15 (2–9)	Koessler Athletic Center (621); Buffalo, NY
February 8, 2024; 7:00 p.m., ESPN+		Quinnipiac	L 40–46	5–16 (2–10)	Run Baby Run Arena (333); Jersey City, NJ
February 10, 2024; 2:00 p.m., ESPN+		at Fairfield	L 46–52	5–17 (2–11)	Leo D. Mahoney Arena (925); Fairfield, CT
February 15, 2024; 7:00 p.m., ESPN+		Manhattan	W 61–55	6–17 (3–11)	Run Baby Run Arena (301); Jersey City, NJ
February 17, 2024; 2:00 p.m., ESPN+		Iona	L 35–54	6–18 (3–12)	Run Baby Run Arena (294); Jersey City, NJ
February 22, 2024; 7:00 p.m., ESPN+		at Rider	L 48–59	6–19 (3–13)	Alumni Gymnasium (591); Lawrenceville, NJ
February 24, 2024; 2:00 p.m., ESPN+		Siena	L 57–75	6–20 (3–14)	Run Baby Run Arena (272); Jersey City, NJ
March 2, 2024; 4:00 p.m., ESPN+		at Marist	W 58–57 ^{OT}	7–20 (4–14)	McCann Arena (1,217); Poughkeepsie, NY
March 7, 2024; 7:00 p.m., ESPN+		No. 25 Fairfield	L 46–63	7–21 (4–15)	Run Baby Run Arena (319); Jersey City, NJ
March 9, 2024; 1:00 p.m., ESPN+		at Mount St. Mary's	L 46–56	7–22 (4–16)	Knott Arena (463); Emmitsburg, MD
MAAC tournament
March 12, 2024; 12:45 pm, ESPN+	(10)	vs. (7) Quinnipiac; First round	L 63–68	7–23	Boardwalk Hall; Atlantic City, NJ
*Non-conference game. ^{#}Rankings from AP poll. (#) Tournament seedings in parentheses. All times are in Eastern.
