= 2023–24 Quinnipiac Bobcats women's basketball team =

American college basketball season

2023–24 Quinnipiac Bobcats women's basketball
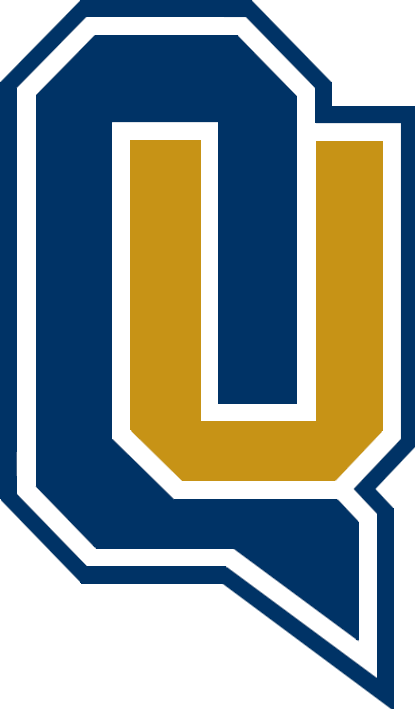
- Conference: Metro Atlantic Athletic Conference
- Record: 10–16 (7–10 MAAC)
- Head coach: Tricia Fabbri (29th season)
- Assistant coaches: Jen Fay; William Sullivan; Sam Guastella
- Home arena: M&T Bank Arena

2023–24 MAAC women's basketball standings
	Conf.				Overall
Team	W		L	PCT	W		L	PCT
Fairfield †	20	–	0	1.000	31	–	2	.939
Niagara	15	–	5	.750	21	–	14	.600
Siena	14	–	6	.700	18	–	12	.600
Manhattan	11	–	9	.550	18	–	12	.600
Canisius	11	–	9	.550	17	–	14	.548
Mount St. Mary's	10	–	10	.500	14	–	17	.452
Quinnipiac	9	–	11	.450	13	–	18	.419
Rider	6	–	14	.300	10	–	21	.323
Iona	6	–	14	.300	11	–	19	.367
Saint Peter's	4	–	16	.200	7	–	23	.233
Marist	4	–	16	.200	6	–	25	.194
† 2024 MAAC tournament winner

The 2023–24 Quinnipiac Bobcats women's basketball team represented Quinnipiac University during the 2023–24 NCAA Division I women's basketball season. The Bobcats, led by 29th-year head coach Tricia Fabbri, played their home games at M&T Bank Arena in Hamden, Connecticut as members of the Metro Atlantic Athletic Conference.

== Previous season ==
The Bobcats finished the 2022–23 season 21–9, 16–4 in MAAC play to finish in a tie for second place. In the MAAC tournament, they were upset by Manhattan in the quarterfinals.

== Roster ==
2023–24 Quinnipiac Bobcats women's basketball team
Players
Coaches

Pos.	#	Name	Height	Year	Previous school	Hometown
F	0	Tiera White	6 ft 0 in (1.83 m)	Sr	Father Lopez Catholic High School	Port Orange, Florida
G/F	1	Emma Carman	5 ft 10 in (1.78 m)	Fr	Red Bank Catholic High School	Barnegat, New Jersey
G	2	Kassidy Thompson	5 ft 10 in (1.78 m)	Fr	Camden Catholic High School	Mullica Hill, New Jersey
F	4	Grace LaBarge	6 ft 3 in (1.91 m)	Jr	William Fremd High School	Inverness, Illinois
G	5	Paige Girardi	5 ft 9 in (1.75 m)	Fr	Warwick Valley High School	Warwick, New York
G	10	Maria Kealy	5 ft 9 in (1.75 m)	Fr	Loreto Letterkenny	Donegal, Ireland
G/F	11	Bri Bowen	5 ft 10 in (1.78 m)	So	Delaware	Chalfont, Pennsylvania
F	12	Ella O'Donnell	6 ft 3 in (1.91 m)	So	Rathdown School	Shankill, Ireland
G	14	Jillian Casey	5 ft 10 in (1.78 m)	Sr	Horseheads High School	Horseheads, New York
G	15	Karson Martin	5 ft 7 in (1.7 m)	Fr	Woodstock High School	Woodstock, Georgia
G	21	Jackie Grisdale (C)	5 ft 9 in (1.75 m)	Jr	Poland Seminary High School	Poland, Ohio
F/C	23	Anna Foley	6 ft 3 in (1.91 m)	Fr	Andover High School	Andover, Massachusetts
G	24	Ava Sollenne	5 ft 6 in (1.68 m)	Fr	St. Luke's School	Greenwich, Connecticut
G	32	Reiven Douglas	5 ft 7 in (1.7 m)	Jr	Millbrook High School	Raleigh, North Carolina
C	33	Khadijah Tungo	6 ft 6 in (1.98 m)	So	Complexo Escolar Privado Frei Joao Domingos	Luanda, Angola

Head coach

- Tricia Fabbri (Fairfield)

Assistant coach(es)

- Jen Fay (Quinnipiac)
- William Sullivan (Connecticut)
- Sam Guastella (Quinnipiac)

Legend

- (C) Team captain
- (S) Suspended
- (I) Ineligible
- (W) Walk-on
- Injured
- Current redshirt

Roster
Last update: February 17, 2024

== Schedule and results ==
Date time, TV	Rank^{#}	Opponent^{#}	Result	Record	Site (attendance) city, state
Regular season
November 6, 2023*; 5:30 pm, ESPN+		Maine	W 70–57	1–0	M&T Bank Arena (603); Hamden, CT
November 12, 2023*; 2:00 pm, ESPN+		at Harvard	L 41–85	1–1	Lavietes Pavilion (892); Cambridge, MA
November 17, 2023*; 4:00 pm, ESPN+		Vermont	L 53–58	1–2	M&T Bank Arena (303); Hamden, CT
November 25, 2023*; 1:00 pm, ESPN+		at Navy; Navy Classic	L 62–75	1–3	Alumni Hall (384); Annapolis, MD
November 26, 2023*; 3:30 pm		vs. Towson; Navy Classic	L 65–75	1–4	Alumni Hall (167); Annapolis, MD
November 30, 2023*; 6:00 pm, ESPN+		at Rhode Island	W 61–59	2–4	Ryan Center (1,137); Kingston, RI
December 6, 2023*; 7:00 pm, NBCSPHI/ESPN+		at Princeton	L 70–79	2–5	Jadwin Gymnasium (640); Princeton, NJ
December 10, 2023*; 2:00 pm, ESPN+		Holy Cross	W 66–63	3–5	M&T Bank Arena (587); Hamden, CT
December 18, 2023; 7:00 pm, ESPN+		at Rider	W 60–57	4–5 (1–0)	Alumni Gymnasium (354); Lawrenceville, NJ
December 30, 2023*; 1:00 pm, ESPN+		at Yale	L 48–72	4–6	John J. Lee Amphitheater (572); New Haven, CT
January 4, 2024; 11:00 am, ESPN+		Saint Peter's	W 50–39	5–6 (2–0)	M&T Bank Arena (2,476); Hamden, CT
January 6, 2024; 1:00 pm, ESPN+		Manhattan	W 71–59	6–6 (3–0)	M&T Bank Arena (622); Hamden, CT
January 11, 2024; 7:00 pm, ESPN+		at Mount St. Mary's	L 50–56	6–7 (3–1)	Knott Arena (285); Emmitsburg, MD
January 13, 2024; 4:00 pm, ESPN+		Iona	W 70–64	7–7 (4–1)	M&T Bank Arena (656); Hamden, CT
January 18, 2024; 6:00 pm, ESPN+		at Canisius	L 58–69	7–8 (4–2)	Koessler Athletic Center (372); Buffalo, NY
January 20, 2024; 2:00 pm, ESPN+		at Niagara	L 78–86 ^{OT}	7–9 (4–3)	Gallagher Center (487); Lewiston, NY
January 25, 2024; 5:00 pm, ESPN+		Fairfield	L 59–74	7–10 (4–4)	M&T Bank Arena (551); Hamden, CT
January 27, 2024; 4:00 pm, ESPN+		Siena	L 60–78	7–11 (4–5)	M&T Bank Arena (888); Hamden, CT
February 1, 2024; 7:00 pm, ESPN+		at Marist	W 64–62 ^{OT}	8–11 (5–5)	McCann Arena (1,017); Poughkeepsie, NY
February 3, 2024; 1:00 pm, ESPN+		Rider	W 65–54	9–11 (6–5)	M&T Bank Arena (412); Hamden, CT
February 8, 2024; 7:00 pm, ESPN+		at Saint Peter's	W 46–40	10–11 (7–5)	Run Baby Run Arena (333); Jersey City, NJ
February 10, 2024; 2:00 pm, ESPN+		at Siena	L 55–74	10–12 (7–6)	UHY Center (965); Loudonville, NY
February 15, 2024; 6:00 pm, ESPN+		Mount St. Mary's	L 45–54	10–13 (7–7)	M&T Bank Arena (389); Hamden, CT
February 17, 2024; 2:00 pm, ESPN+		at Manhattan	L 66–72 ^{OT}	10–14 (7–8)	Draddy Gymnasium (575); Riverdale, NY
February 22, 2024; 6:00 pm, ESPN+		Niagara	L 60–66 ^{OT}	10–15 (7–9)	M&T Bank Arena (421); Hamden, CT
February 24, 2024; 2:00 pm, ESPN+		Canisius	L 53–69	10–16 (7–10)	M&T Bank Arena (623); Hamden, CT
February 29, 2024; 7:00 pm, ESPN+		at Fairfield	L 46-64	10-17 (7-11)	Leo D. Mahoney Arena (1,117); Fairfield, CT
March 7, 2024; 7:00 pm, ESPN+		at Iona	W 72-68	11-17 (8-11)	Hynes Athletics Center (675); New Rochelle, NY
March 9, 2024; 2:00 pm, ESPN+		Marist	W 51-42	12-17 (9-11)	M&T Bank Arena (670); Hamden, CT
MAAC tournament
March 12, 2024; 12:45 pm, ESPN+	(7)	vs. (10) Saint Peter's; First round	W 68-63 ^{OT}	13-17	Boardwalk Hall; Atlantic City, NJ
March 13, 2024; 3:30 pm, ESPN+	(7)	vs. (2) Niagara; Quarterfinals	L 56-70	13-18	Boardwalk Hall (896); Atlantic City, NJ
*Non-conference game. ^{#}Rankings from AP Poll. (#) Tournament seedings in parentheses. All times are in Eastern.
