= 2023–24 Iona Gaels women's basketball team =

American college basketball season

2023–24 Iona Gaels women's basketball
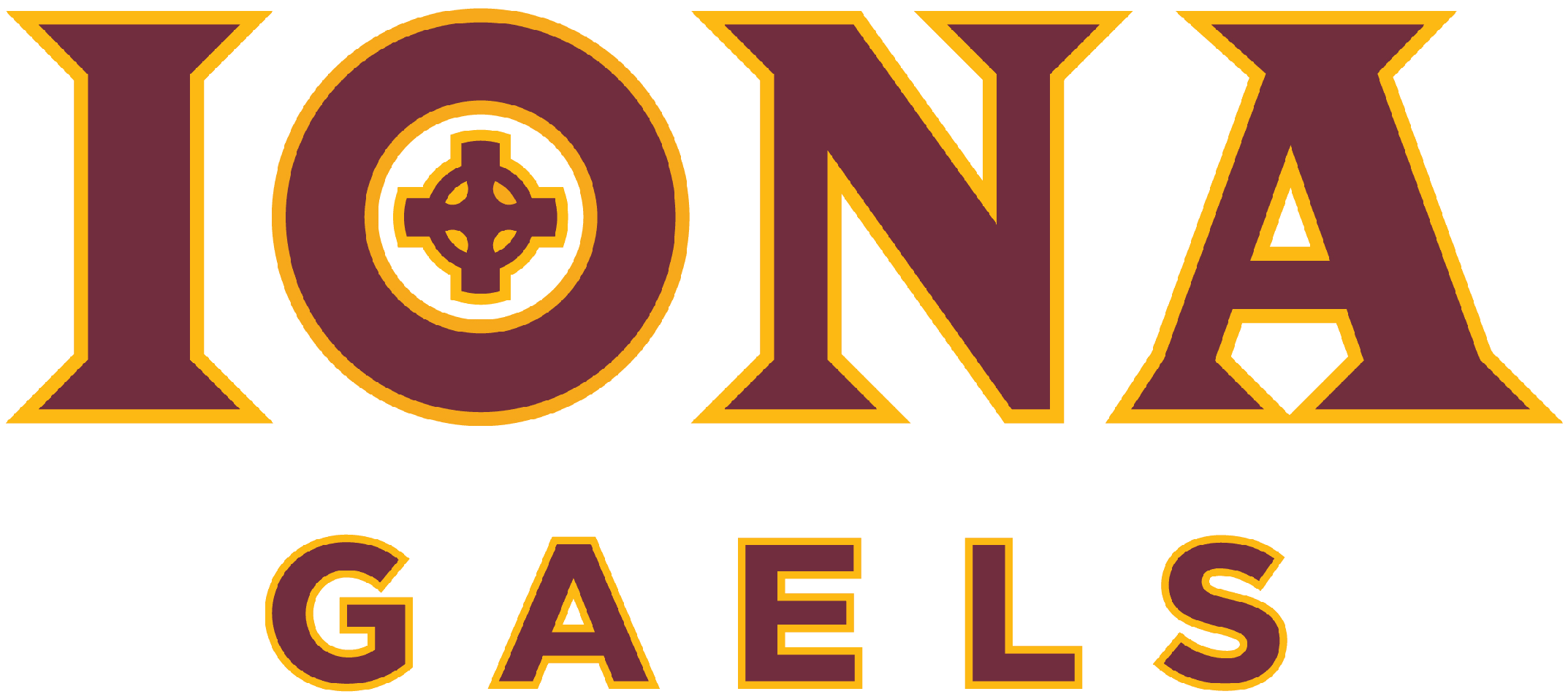
- Conference: Metro Atlantic Athletic Conference
- Record: 11–19 (6–14 MAAC)
- Head coach: Angelika Szumilo (1st season)
- Associate head coach: LaTanya Collins
- Assistant coaches: Stephen Perretta; Christian Mordi
- Home arena: Hynes Athletics Center

2023–24 MAAC women's basketball standings
	Conf.				Overall
Team	W		L	PCT	W		L	PCT
Fairfield †	20	–	0	1.000	31	–	2	.939
Niagara	15	–	5	.750	21	–	14	.600
Siena	14	–	6	.700	18	–	12	.600
Manhattan	11	–	9	.550	18	–	12	.600
Canisius	11	–	9	.550	17	–	14	.548
Mount St. Mary's	10	–	10	.500	14	–	17	.452
Quinnipiac	9	–	11	.450	13	–	18	.419
Rider	6	–	14	.300	10	–	21	.323
Iona	6	–	14	.300	11	–	19	.367
Saint Peter's	4	–	16	.200	7	–	23	.233
Marist	4	–	16	.200	6	–	25	.194
† 2024 MAAC tournament winner

The 2023–24 Iona Gaels women's basketball team represented Iona University during the 2023–24 NCAA Division I women's basketball season. The Gaels, led by first-year head coach Angelika Szumilo, played their home games at the Hynes Athletics Center in New Rochelle, New York. They were members of the Metro Atlantic Athletic Conference (MAAC).

The Gaels finished the season 11–19, 6–14 in MAAC play, to finish in a tie for eighth place. They were defeated by Rider in the first round of the MAAC tournament.

== Previous season ==
The Gaels finished the 2022–23 season 26–7, 18–2 in MAAC play, to finish as MAAC regular season champions. In the MAAC tournament, they defeated Mount St. Mary's in the quarterfinals, Siena in the semifinals, and Manhattan to win the MAAC tournament championship and earned the conference's automatic bid into the NCAA tournament. They received the #14 seed in the Seattle Regional 4, where they would lose to Duke in the first round.

On April 5, 2023, it was announced that head coach Billi Chambers would be resigning, after ten seasons, in order to take the head coaching position at Xavier. On April 17, the school announced the hiring of Fairleigh Dickinson head coach Angelika Szumilo as the Gaels' next head coach.

== Roster ==
2023–24 Iona Gaels women's basketball team
Players
Coaches

Pos.	#	Name	Height	Year	Previous school	Hometown
G	1	Natalia Otkhmezuri	5 ft 8 in (1.73 m)	GS	Southern Utah	Tbilisi, Georgia
G	2	Talia DePetrillo	5 ft 6 in (1.68 m)	Jr	UC Colorado Springs	Dallas, TX
F	3	Taliya Heron	6 ft 0 in (1.83 m)	Fr	Bond Academy	Ajax, ON
G	4	Ale Civera	5 ft 10 in (1.78 m)	So	IES Ortega y Gasset	Madrid, Spain
F	5	Petra Oborilova	6 ft 2 in (1.88 m)	So	Stredná Športová Škola	Banská Bystrica, Slovakia
G	6	Judith Gomez	5 ft 9 in (1.75 m)	Jr	IES Francesc Macià	Barcelona, Spain
G	7	Addy Salzer	5 ft 11 in (1.8 m)	Jr	Waconia High School	St. Bonifacius, MN
G	10	Ella Fajardo	5 ft 5 in (1.65 m)	Jr	Fairleigh Dickinson	Bergenfield, NJ
G	11	Daniela Ciscar	6 ft 1 in (1.85 m)	Fr	IES Lluis Simarro Lacabra	Valencia, Spain
G	14	Mya Zaccagnini	5 ft 5 in (1.65 m)	Fr	Holy Cross High School	Waterbury, CT
G	21	Amaya B. Evans	5 ft 5 in (1.65 m)	So	Neptune High School	Neptune, NJ
F	22	Emma Donnelly	6 ft 1 in (1.85 m)	Fr	Rosebank College	Ashbury, Australia
F	30	Zoey Ward	6 ft 0 in (1.83 m)	Fr	Concord Academy	Gastonia, NC
G	35	Noa Givon	5 ft 10 in (1.78 m)	So	Hapoel Petah Tikva	Ra'anana, Israel
F	41	Sierra DeAngelo	6 ft 0 in (1.83 m)	GS	Fairleigh Dickinson	Pittsburgh, PA
C	43	Ally Carman	6 ft 5 in (1.96 m)	So	Boston College	Barnegat, NJ

Head coach

- Angelika Szumilo (LIU Brooklyn)

Assistant coach(es)

- LaTanya Collins (Virginia State)
- Stephen Perretta (Villanova)
- Christian Mordi (William Paterson)

Legend

- (C) Team captain
- (S) Suspended
- (I) Ineligible
- (W) Walk-on
- Injured
- Current redshirt

Roster
Last update: February 18, 2024

== Schedule and results ==
Date time, TV	Rank^{#}	Opponent^{#}	Result	Record	Site (attendance) city, state
Regular season
November 7, 2023*; 7:00 p.m., FloHoops		at Seton Hall	L 32–75	0–1	Walsh Gymnasium (757); South Orange, NJ
November 12, 2023*; 7:00 p.m., ESPN+		LIU	W 80–59	1–1	Hynes Athletics Center (783); New Rochelle, NY
November 15, 2023*; 5:30 p.m., CatEyeNetwork		at Bethune–Cookman	L 72–74 ^{OT}	1–2	Moore Gymnasium (555); Daytona Beach, FL
November 18, 2023*; 3:00 p.m., ESPN+		at Stetson	L 62–71	1–3	Edmunds Center (247); DeLand, FL
November 27, 2023*; 7:00 p.m., NEC Front Row		at Wagner	W 67–55	2–3	Spiro Sports Center (453); Staten Island, NY
December 2, 2023*; 2:00 p.m., FloHoops		at Providence	W 61–49	3–3	Alumni Hall (528); Providence, RI
December 7, 2023*; 7:00 p.m., MSG		at Hofstra	W 59–54	4–3	Mack Sports Complex (343); Hempstead, NY
December 10, 2023*; 12:00 p.m., ESPN+		Sacred Heart	W 60–50	5–3	Hynes Athletics Center (1,021); New Rochelle, NY
December 16, 2023; 1:00 p.m., ESPN+		Niagara	L 48–67	5–4 (0–1)	Hynes Athletics Center (914); New Rochelle, NY
December 21, 2023*; 1:00 p.m., ESPN+		Stony Brook	L 49–71	5–5	Hynes Athletics Center (623); New Rochelle, NY
January 4, 2024; 7:00 p.m., ESPN+		at Rider	L 56–63	5–6 (0–2)	Alumni Gymnasium (511); Lawrenceville, NJ
January 6, 2024; 1:00 p.m., ESPN+		Marist	W 70–60	6–6 (1–2)	Hynes Athletics Center (835); New Rochelle, NY
January 11, 2024; 7:00 p.m., ESPN+		at Fairfield	L 44–72	6–7 (1–3)	Leo D. Mahoney Arena (498); Fairfield, CT
January 13, 2024; 4:00 p.m., ESPN+		at Quinnipiac	L 64–70	6–8 (1–4)	M&T Bank Arena (656); Hamden, CT
January 18, 2024; 11:00 a.m., ESPN+		Saint Peter's	W 68–62	7–8 (2–4)	Hynes Athletics Center (2,576); New Rochelle, NY
January 20, 2024; 2:00 p.m., ESPN+		at Siena	L 56–77	7–9 (2–5)	UHY Center (713); Loudonville, NY
January 25, 2024; 7:00 p.m., ESPN+		Canisius	L 43–53	7–10 (2–6)	Hynes Athletics Center (787); New Rochelle, NY
January 27, 2024; 1:00 p.m., ESPN+		Manhattan	L 56–64	7–11 (2–7)	Hynes Athletics Center (944); New Rochelle, NY
February 1, 2024; 7:00 p.m., ESPN+		at Mount St. Mary's	L 48–55	7–12 (2–8)	Knott Arena (304); Emmitsburg, MD
February 3, 2024; 3:00 p.m., ESPN+		Fairfield	L 49–85	7–13 (2–9)	Hynes Athletics Center (212); New Rochelle, NY
February 8, 2024; 7:00 p.m., ESPN+		Siena	L 57–74	7–14 (2–10)	Hynes Athletics Center (560); New Rochelle, NY
February 10, 2024; 7:00 p.m., ESPN+		at Marist	W 62–53	8–14 (3–10)	McCann Arena (1,879); Poughkeepsie, NY
February 15, 2024; 6:00 p.m., ESPNU/ESPN+		Rider	L 43–45	8–15 (3–11)	Hynes Athletics Center (600); New Rochelle, NY
February 17, 2024; 2:00 p.m., ESPN+		at Saint Peter's	W 54–35	9–15 (4–11)	Run Baby Run Arena (294); Jersey City, NJ
February 24, 2024; 1:00 p.m., ESPN+		Mount St. Mary's	W 62–56	10–15 (5–11)	Hynes Athletics Center (690); New Rochelle, NY
February 29, 2024; 6:00 p.m., ESPN+		at Canisius	W 71–58	11–15 (6–11)	Koessler Athletic Center (742); Buffalo, NY
March 2, 2024; 2:00 p.m., ESPN+		at Niagara	L 58–86	11–16 (6–12)	Gallagher Center (405); Lewiston, NY
March 7, 2024; 7:00 p.m., ESPN+		Quinnipiac	L 68–72	11–17 (6–13)	Hynes Athletics Center (675); New Rochelle, NY
March 9, 2024; 1:00 p.m., ESPN+		at Manhattan	L 56–66	11–18 (6–14)	Draddy Gymnasium (427); Riverdale, NY
MAAC tournament
March 12, 2024; 10:30 a.m., ESPN+	(9)	vs. (8) Rider; First round	L 56–66	11–19	Boardwalk Hall; Atlantic City, NJ
*Non-conference game. ^{#}Rankings from AP poll. (#) Tournament seedings in parentheses. All times are in Eastern.
