= 2023–24 Manhattan Jaspers women's basketball team =

American college basketball season

2023–24 Manhattan Jaspers women's basketball
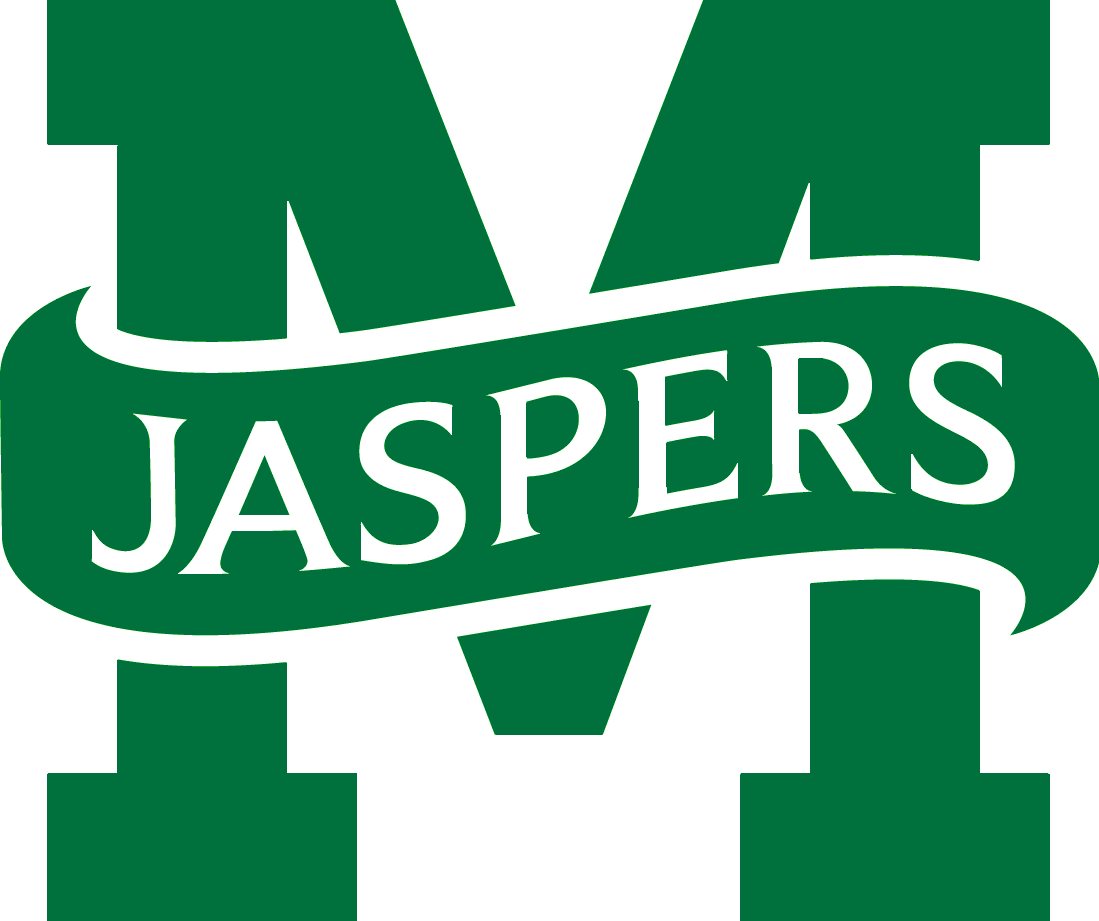
- Conference: Metro Atlantic Athletic Conference
- Record: 17–8 (10–6 MAAC)
- Head coach: Heather Vulin (8th season)
- Associate head coach: Callan Stores
- Assistant coaches: Phyllis Mangina; Sara Mitchell
- Home arena: Draddy Gymnasium

2023–24 MAAC women's basketball standings
	Conf.				Overall
Team	W		L	PCT	W		L	PCT
Fairfield †	20	–	0	1.000	31	–	2	.939
Niagara	15	–	5	.750	21	–	14	.600
Siena	14	–	6	.700	18	–	12	.600
Manhattan	11	–	9	.550	18	–	12	.600
Canisius	11	–	9	.550	17	–	14	.548
Mount St. Mary's	10	–	10	.500	14	–	17	.452
Quinnipiac	9	–	11	.450	13	–	18	.419
Rider	6	–	14	.300	10	–	21	.323
Iona	6	–	14	.300	11	–	19	.367
Saint Peter's	4	–	16	.200	7	–	23	.233
Marist	4	–	16	.200	6	–	25	.194
† 2024 MAAC tournament winner

The 2023–24 Manhattan Jaspers women's basketball team represented Manhattan College during the 2023–24 NCAA Division I women's basketball season. The Jaspers, led by eighth-year head coach Heather Vulin, played their home games at Draddy Gymnasium in Riverdale, New York as members of the Metro Atlantic Athletic Conference (MAAC).

The Jaspers finished the season 18–11, 11–9 in MAAC play, to finish in a tie for fourth place. They were defeated by Canisius in the quarterfinals of the MAAC tournament.

== Previous season ==
The Jaspers finished the 2022–23 season 16–17, 10–10 in MAAC play, to finish in sixth place. In the MAAC tournament, they defeated Saint Peter's in the first round, and upset Quinnipiac in the quarterfinals and Niagara in the semifinals, before falling to top-seeded Iona in the championship game.

== Roster ==
2023–24 Manhattan Jaspers women's basketball team
Players
Coaches

Pos.	#	Name	Height	Year	Previous school	Hometown
F	0	Narrie Dodson	6 ft 0 in (1.83 m)	GS	Towson	Baton Rouge, LA
G	1	Dejah Jenkins	5 ft 7 in (1.7 m)	Sr	Central Connecticut	Dorchester, MA
G	2	Anne Bair	5 ft 8 in (1.73 m)	So	Gettysburg High School	Gettysburg, PA
F	3	Kristina Juric	6 ft 2 in (1.88 m)	Fr	Kušlanova Gymnasium	Bukovacka, Croatia
F	4	Tegan Young	6 ft 1 in (1.85 m)	Fr	Lawrence Academy	Leominster, MA
G	5	Jayla James	6 ft 1 in (1.85 m)	GS	Michigan State	Upper Marlboro, MD
G	10	Alyssa Costigan	6 ft 0 in (1.83 m)	So	Paul VI High School	Herndon, VA
F	12	Leyla Ozturk	6 ft 1 in (1.85 m)	Sr	Schiller-Gymnasium	Berlin, Germany
F	15	Caroline de Klauman	6 ft 2 in (1.88 m)	So	Winthrop	Gentofte, Denmark
F	20	Jade Blagrove	6 ft 2 in (1.88 m)	Sr	South Florida	Barendrecht, Netherlands
G	21	Nitzan Amar	5 ft 10 in (1.78 m)	Jr	UNC Greensboro	Yir'on, Israel
G/F	23	Ines Gimenez Monserrat	5 ft 10 in (1.78 m)	Sr	Franklin Pierce	Mallorca, Spain
C	24	Becca Wilson	6 ft 4 in (1.93 m)	GS	Coppin State	Mount Vernon, NY
F	25	Petra Juric	6 ft 2 in (1.88 m)	Jr	III. Gymnasium	Zagreb, Croatia

Head coach

- Heather Vulin (Minnesota Morris)

Assistant coach(es)

- Callan Stores (Sacred Heart)
- Phyllis Mangina (Seton Hall)
- Sara Mitchell (King)

Legend

- (C) Team captain
- (S) Suspended
- (I) Ineligible
- (W) Walk-on
- Injured
- Current redshirt

Roster
Last update: February 16, 2024

== Schedule and results ==
Date time, TV	Rank^{#}	Opponent^{#}	Result	Record	Site (attendance) city, state
Exhibition
November 1, 2023*; 7:00 p.m.		Queens (NY)	W 68–42	–	Draddy Gymnasium (134); Riverdale, NY
Regular season
November 6, 2023*; 7:00 p.m., ESPN+		Central Connecticut	W 52–35	1–0	Draddy Gymnasium (336); Riverdale, NY
November 10, 2023*; 6:00 p.m., ESPN+		George Washington	L 49–55	1–1	Draddy Gymnasium (437); Riverdale, NY
November 16, 2023*; 7:00 p.m., ESPN+		at Fordham; Battle of the Bronx	W 58–44	2–1	Rose Hill Gymnasium (–); The Bronx, NY
November 19, 2023*; 2:00 p.m., FloHoops		at St. John's	L 47–67	2–2	Carnesecca Arena (324); Queens, NY
November 26, 2023*; 2:00 p.m.		at Howard	W 53–50	3–2	Burr Gymnasium (245); Washington, D.C.
December 3, 2023*; 2:00 p.m., ESPN+		UMBC	W 68–52	4–2	Draddy Gymnasium (142); Riverdale, NY
December 9, 2023*; 12:00 p.m., ESPN+		Vermont	W 53–43	5–2	Draddy Gymnasium (402); Riverdale, NY
December 16, 2023; 2:00 p.m., ESPN+		Rider	W 73–39	6–2 (1–0)	Draddy Gymnasium (202); Riverdale, NY
December 18, 2023; 7:00 p.m., ESPN+		at Fairfield	L 58–82	6–3 (1–1)	Leo D. Mahoney Arena (463); Fairfield, CT
December 21, 2023*; 12:00 p.m., NEC Front Row		at LIU	W 66–55	7–3	Steinberg Wellness Center (196); Brooklyn, NY
December 31, 2023*; 1:00 p.m., FloHoops		at Hofstra	W 53–45	8–3	Mack Sports Complex (394); Hempstead, NY
January 4, 2024; 11:00 a.m., ESPN+		Siena	W 60–53	9–3 (2–1)	Draddy Gymnasium (208); Riverdale, NY
January 6, 2024; 1:00 p.m., ESPN+		at Quinnipiac	L 59–71	9–4 (2–2)	M&T Bank Arena (622); Hamden, CT
January 13, 2024; 2:00 p.m., ESPN+		Saint Peter's	W 41–37	10–4 (3–2)	Draddy Gymnasium (234); Riverdale, NY
January 18, 2024; 6:00 p.m., ESPN+		at Niagara	W 64–53	11–4 (4–2)	Gallagher Center (436); Lewiston, NY
January 20, 2024; 1:00 p.m., ESPN+		at Canisius	W 58–55	12–4 (5–2)	Koessler Athletic Center (385); Buffalo, NY
January 25, 2024; 7:00 p.m., ESPN+		Marist	W 60–54	13–4 (6–2)	Draddy Gymnasium (354); Riverdale, NY
January 27, 2024; 1:00 p.m., ESPN+		at Iona	W 64–56	14–4 (7–2)	Hynes Athletics Center (944); New Rochelle, NY
February 1, 2024; 7:00 p.m., ESPN+		at Siena	L 51–74	14–5 (7–3)	UHY Center (679); Loudonville, NY
February 3, 2024; 2:00 p.m., ESPN+		Mount St. Mary's	W 67–60	15–5 (8–3)	Draddy Gymnasium (317); Riverdale, NY
February 8, 2024; 7:00 p.m., ESPN+		Niagara	L 63–88	15–6 (8–4)	Draddy Gymnasium (247); Riverdale, NY
February 10, 2024; 2:00 p.m., ESPN+		at Rider	L 54–58	15–7 (8–5)	Alumni Gymnasium (494); Lawrenceville, NJ
February 15, 2024; 7:00 p.m., ESPN+		at Saint Peter's	L 55–61	15–8 (8–6)	Run Baby Run Arena (301); Jersey City, NJ
February 17, 2024; 2:00 p.m., ESPN+		Quinnipiac	W 72–66 ^{OT}	16–8 (9–6)	Draddy Gymnasium (575); Riverdale, NY
February 22, 2024; 7:00 p.m., ESPN+		Canisius	W 54–51	17–8 (10–6)	Draddy Gymnasium (337); Riverdale, NY
February 29, 2024; 7:00 p.m., ESPN+		at Mount St. Mary's	L 43–58	17–9 (10–7)	Knott Arena; Emmitsburg, MD
March 2, 2024; 2:00 p.m., ESPN+		Fairfield	L 53–77	17–10 (10–8)	Draddy Gymnasium; Riverdale, NY
March 7, 2024; 7:00 p.m., ESPN+		at Marist	L 48–49	17–11 (10–9)	McCann Arena; Poughkeepsie, NY
March 9, 2024; 1:00 p.m., ESPN+		Iona	W 66–56	18–11 (11–9)	Draddy Gymnasium; Riverdale, NY
MAAC tournament
March 14, 2024; 3:30 pm, ESPN+	(4)	vs. (5) Canisius; Quarterfinals	L 55-58	18-12	Boardwalk Hall (875); Atlantic City, NJ
*Non-conference game. ^{#}Rankings from AP poll. (#) Tournament seedings in parentheses. All times are in Eastern.
