= 2023–24 Marist Red Foxes women's basketball team =

American college basketball season

2023–24 Marist Red Foxes women's basketball
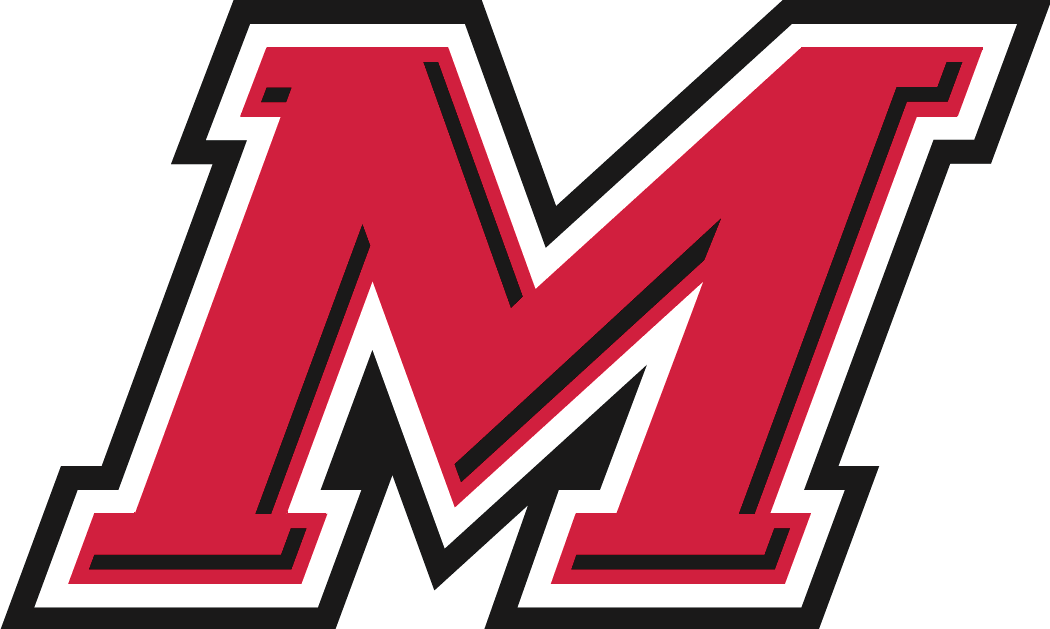
- Conference: Metro Atlantic Athletic Conference
- Record: 5–21 (3–13 MAAC)
- Head coach: Erin Doughty (1st season)
- Assistant coaches: Nick Volchok; Maggie Gallagher; Kiah Gillespie; Keylantra Langley
- Home arena: McCann Arena

2023–24 MAAC women's basketball standings
	Conf.				Overall
Team	W		L	PCT	W		L	PCT
Fairfield †	20	–	0	1.000	31	–	2	.939
Niagara	15	–	5	.750	21	–	14	.600
Siena	14	–	6	.700	18	–	12	.600
Manhattan	11	–	9	.550	18	–	12	.600
Canisius	11	–	9	.550	17	–	14	.548
Mount St. Mary's	10	–	10	.500	14	–	17	.452
Quinnipiac	9	–	11	.450	13	–	18	.419
Rider	6	–	14	.300	10	–	21	.323
Iona	6	–	14	.300	11	–	19	.367
Saint Peter's	4	–	16	.200	7	–	23	.233
Marist	4	–	16	.200	6	–	25	.194
† 2024 MAAC tournament winner

The 2023–24 Marist Red Foxes women's basketball team represented Marist College during the 2023–24 NCAA Division I women's basketball season. The Red Foxes, led by first-year head coach Erin Doughty, played their home games at the McCann Arena in Poughkeepsie, New York as members of the Metro Atlantic Athletic Conference (MAAC). They finished the season 6–25, 4–16 in MAAC play, to finish in last (11th) place. In the MAAC tournament, they were upset by Mount St. Mary's in the first round.

== Previous season ==
The Red Foxes finished the 2022–23 season 12–18, 8–12 in MAAC play, to finish in seventh place. In the MAAC tournament, they were upset by Rider in the first round.

On February 28, 2022, head coach Brian Giorgis announced that he would be retiring at the end of the 2022–23 season after leading the Red Foxes for 21 seasons, with assistant coach Erin Doughty being named Giorgis's successor.

== Roster ==
2023–24 Marist Red Foxes women's basketball team
Players
Coaches

Pos.	#	Name	Height	Year	Previous school	Hometown
G	0	Amanda Zeno	5 ft 5 in (1.65 m)	Sr	Fallsburg High School	Fallsburg, NY
C	1	Maeve Donnelly	6 ft 5 in (1.96 m)	GS	Hawaii	Binghamton, NY
G	2	Jackie Piddock	5 ft 8 in (1.73 m)	So	South Jefferson High School	Adams, NY
G	3	Kiara Fisher	5 ft 7 in (1.7 m)	Sr	Syracuse	Elmira, NY
G	5	Julia Corsentino	5 ft 7 in (1.7 m)	Fr	Rumson-Fair Haven High School	Fair Haven, NJ
G	11	Jayne Whitman	5 ft 6 in (1.68 m)	So	Amity Regional High School	Orange, CT
F	14	Erin Fox	6 ft 1 in (1.85 m)	Sr	Millbrook High School	LaGrangeville, NY
F	20	Zaria Shazer	6 ft 1 in (1.85 m)	Sr	Elmira High School	Elmira, NY
G	21	Samantha Chadwick	5 ft 9 in (1.75 m)	Jr	Central Connecticut	Litchfield, CT
F	22	Ciara Croker	6 ft 0 in (1.83 m)	So	The Ursuline School	New Rochelle, NY
G	23	Lexie Tarul	5 ft 11 in (1.8 m)	RS So	Fordham	The Bronx, NY
F	24	Kate Robbins	6 ft 2 in (1.88 m)	Fr	Upper St. Clair High School	Pittsburgh, PA
G	25	Catie Cunningham	5 ft 11 in (1.8 m)	Jr	West Genesee High School	Syracuse, NY
G	30	Morgan Tompkins	5 ft 11 in (1.8 m)	So	Red Hook High School	Red Hook, NY
C	31	Morgan Lee	6 ft 5 in (1.96 m)	So	Georgetown	Kent, CT
F	42	McKenna Rife	6 ft 3 in (1.91 m)	Jr	St. Maria Goretti High School	Greencastle, PA

Head coach

- Erin Doughty (Marist)

Assistant coach(es)

- Nick Volchok (Mercy)
- Maggie Gallagher (Marist)
- Kiah Gillespie (Florida State)
- Keylantra Langley (St. John's)

Legend

- (C) Team captain
- (S) Suspended
- (I) Ineligible
- (W) Walk-on
- Injured
- Current redshirt

Roster
Last update: February 19, 2024

== Schedule and results ==
Date time, TV	Rank^{#}	Opponent^{#}	Result	Record	Site (attendance) city, state
Regular season
November 9, 2023*; 7:00 p.m., ESPN+		Army	W 76–68	1–0	McCann Arena (1,047); Poughkeepsie, NY
November 11, 2023*; 12:00 p.m., ESPN+		at Penn	L 51–74	1–1	The Palestra (563); Philadelphia, PA
November 15, 2023*; 6:00 p.m., ESPN+		at Lafayette	W 84–76 ^{OT}	2–1	Kirby Sports Center (284); Easton, PA
November 22, 2023*; 2:30 p.m.		vs. Lehigh; Savannah Hoops Invitational	L 64–82	2–2	Enmarket Arena (97); Savannah, GA
November 23, 2023*; 11:30 a.m.		vs. Mercer; Savannah Hoops Invitational	L 67–73 ^{OT}	2–3	Enmarket Arena (84); Savannah, GA
November 28, 2023*; 7:00 p.m., ESPN+		at Yale	L 45–61	2–4	John J. Lee Amphitheater (324); New Haven, CT
December 2, 2023*; 7:00 p.m., ESPN+		St. John's	L 40–50	2–5	McCann Arena (1,121); Poughkeepsie, NY
December 6, 2023*; 7:00 p.m., ESPN+		Drexel	L 36–51	2–6	McCann Arena (952); Poughkeepsie, NY
December 9, 2023*; 2:00 p.m., ESPN+		at Albany	L 39–49	2–7	Broadview Center (858); Albany, NY
December 16, 2023; 2:00 p.m., ESPN+		at Saint Peter's	L 42–51	2–8 (0–1)	Run Baby Run Arena (193); Jersey City, NJ
December 18, 2023; 11:00 a.m., ESPN+		Canisius	L 62–67	2–9 (0–2)	McCann Arena (742); Poughkeepsie, NY
December 21, 2023*; 2:00 p.m., ESPN+		at Cornell	L 61–74	2–10	Newman Arena (684); Ithaca, NY
January 6, 2024; 1:00 p.m., ESPN+		at Iona	L 60–70	2–11 (0–3)	Hynes Athletics Center (835); New Rochelle, NY
January 11, 2024; 7:00 p.m., ESPN+		Rider	W 65–55	3–11 (1–3)	McCann Arena (702); Poughkeepsie, NY
January 13, 2024; 4:00 p.m., ESPN+		Niagara	W 61–60	4–11 (2–3)	McCann Arena (738); Poughkeepsie, NY
January 18, 2024; 7:00 p.m., ESPN+		at Mount St. Mary's	W 45–44	5–11 (3–3)	Knott Arena (427); Emmitsburg, MD
January 20, 2024; 4:00 p.m., ESPN+		Fairfield	L 46–60	5–12 (3–4)	McCann Arena (1,525); Poughkeepsie, NY
January 25, 2024; 7:00 p.m., ESPN+		at Manhattan	L 54–60	5–13 (3–5)	Draddy Gymnasium (354); Riverdale, NY
February 1, 2024; 7:00 p.m., ESPN+		Quinnipiac	L 62–64 ^{OT}	5–14 (3–6)	McCann Arena (1,017); Poughkeepsie, NY
February 3, 2024; 7:00 p.m., ESPN+		Siena	L 67–71	5–15 (3–7)	McCann Arena (1,427); Poughkeepsie, NY
February 8, 2024; 11:00 a.m., ESPN+		at Fairfield	L 49–76	5–16 (3–8)	Leo D. Mahoney Arena (1,891); Fairfield, CT
February 10, 2024; 7:00 p.m., ESPN+		Iona	L 53–62	5–17 (3–9)	McCann Arena (1,879); Poughkeepsie, NY
February 15, 2024; 6:00 p.m., ESPN+		at Canisius	L 52–68	5–18 (3–10)	Koessler Athletic Center (536); Buffalo, NY
February 17, 2024; 2:00 p.m., ESPN+		at Niagara	L 64–90	5–19 (3–11)	Gallagher Center (472); Lewiston, NY
February 22, 2024; 7:00 p.m., ESPN+		Mount St. Mary's	L 57–72	5–20 (3–12)	McCann Arena (710); Poughkeepsie, NY
February 24, 2024; 1:00 p.m., ESPN+		at Rider	L 61–62 ^{OT}	5–21 (3–13)	Alumni Gymnasium (848); Lawrenceville, NJ
February 29, 2024; 7:00 p.m., ESPN+		at Siena	L 62–73	5–22 (3–14)	UHY Center (662); Loudonville, NY
March 2, 2024; 4:00 p.m., ESPN+		Saint Peter's	L 57–58 ^{OT}	5–23 (3–15)	McCann Arena (1,217); Poughkeepsie, NY
March 7, 2024; 7:00 p.m., ESPN+		Manhattan	W 49–48	6–23 (4–15)	McCann Arena (740); Poughkeepsie, NY
March 9, 2024; 2:00 p.m., ESPN+		at Quinnipiac	L 42–51	6–24 (4–16)	M&T Bank Arena (670); Hamden, CT
MAAC tournament
March 12, 2024; 3:00 p.m., ESPN+	(11)	vs. (6) Mount St. Mary's; First round	L 47–60	6–25	Boardwalk Hall; Atlantic City, NJ
*Non-conference game. ^{#}Rankings from AP poll. (#) Tournament seedings in parentheses. All times are in Eastern.
