= 2023–24 Mount St. Mary's Mountaineers women's basketball team =

American college basketball season

2023–24 Mount St. Mary's Mountaineers women's basketball
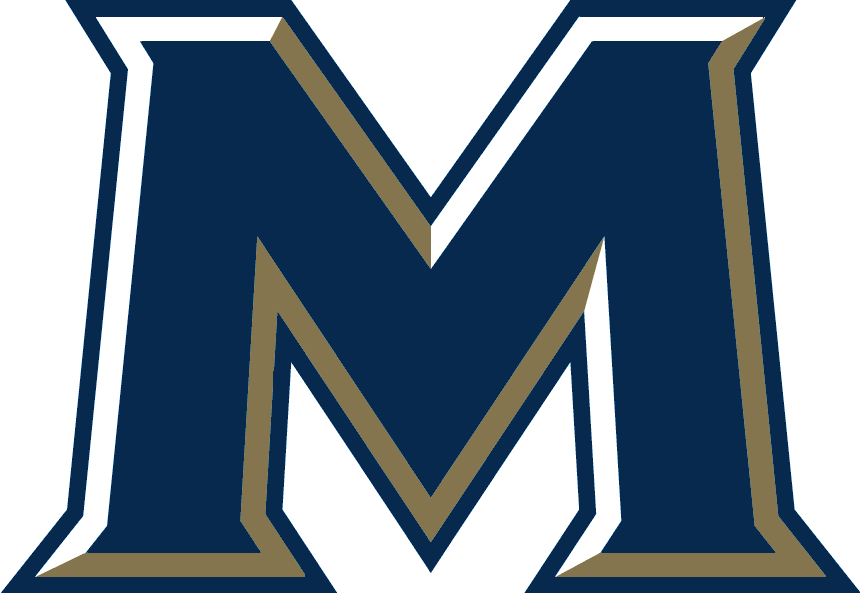
- Conference: Metro Atlantic Athletic Conference
- Record: 14–17 (10–10 MAAC)
- Head coach: Antoine White (3rd season)
- Assistant coaches: Kelsey Funderburgh; Joe Haigh; Maggie Tien
- Home arena: Knott Arena

2023–24 MAAC women's basketball standings
	Conf.				Overall
Team	W		L	PCT	W		L	PCT
Fairfield †	20	–	0	1.000	31	–	2	.939
Niagara	15	–	5	.750	21	–	14	.600
Siena	14	–	6	.700	18	–	12	.600
Manhattan	11	–	9	.550	18	–	12	.600
Canisius	11	–	9	.550	17	–	14	.548
Mount St. Mary's	10	–	10	.500	14	–	17	.452
Quinnipiac	9	–	11	.450	13	–	18	.419
Rider	6	–	14	.300	10	–	21	.323
Iona	6	–	14	.300	11	–	19	.367
Saint Peter's	4	–	16	.200	7	–	23	.233
Marist	4	–	16	.200	6	–	25	.194
† 2024 MAAC tournament winner

The 2023–24 Mount St. Mary's Mountaineers women's basketball team represented Mount St. Mary's University during the 2023–24 NCAA Division I women's basketball season. The Mountaineers, led by third-year head coach Antoine White, played their home games at Knott Arena in Emmitsburg, Maryland as members of the Metro Atlantic Athletic Conference (MAAC).

The Mountaineers finished the season 14–17, 10–10 in MAAC play, to finish in sixth place. They defeated Marist before falling to Siena in the quarterfinals of the MAAC tournament.

== Previous season ==
The Mountaineers finished the 2022–23 season 12–19, 7–13 in MAAC play, to finish in eighth place. In the MAAC tournament, they defeated Canisius in the first round, before falling to top-seeded and eventual tournament champions Iona in the quarterfinals.

== Roster ==
2023–24 Mount St. Mary's Mountaineers women's basketball team
Players
Coaches

Pos.	#	Name	Height	Year	Previous school	Hometown
F	00	Isabella Hunt	5 ft 11 in (1.8 m)	Sr	Bishop McCort HS	Johnstown, PA
G	1	KC Carter	5 ft 8 in (1.73 m)	GS	Cornell	Brooklyn, NY
F	2	Tessa Engelman	6 ft 3 in (1.91 m)	Fr	DME Academy	Calgary, AB
G	3	Maddie Novak	6 ft 0 in (1.83 m)	GS	Stetson	Oxford, MI
G	4	Jo Raflo	5 ft 11 in (1.8 m)	Jr	Presbyterian	Gainesville, VA
G	5	Gabrielle Kennerly	5 ft 9 in (1.75 m)	Fr	Howard HS	Ellicott City, MD
G	6	Rosa Revueltas	5 ft 8 in (1.73 m)	Jr	Arizona Western	Almería, Spain
G	11	Jada Lee	5 ft 5 in (1.65 m)	RS Jr	Carlynton HS	Pittsburgh, PA
G	12	Giana Hoddinott	5 ft 9 in (1.75 m)	RS Fr	Delone Catholic HS	Littlestown, PA
F	13	Aniya Walker	6 ft 2 in (1.88 m)	GS	Duquesne	Pittsburgh, PA
G	15	Jasmine Lindsay-Huskey	5 ft 10 in (1.78 m)	Jr	St. John's Catholic Prep	Middletown, MD
F	20	Jaedyn Jamison	6 ft 1 in (1.85 m)	RS So	Franklin County HS	Rocky Mount, VA
G	22	Jessica Tomasetti	5 ft 5 in (1.65 m)	Sr	Our Lady of Good Counsel HS	North Potomac, MD
F	33	McKenzie Matheny	5 ft 11 in (1.8 m)	So	West Springfield HS	West Springfield, VA
C	50	Jackie Christ	6 ft 3 in (1.91 m)	GS	Radford	Sterling, VA

Head coach

- Antoine White (Southern Vermont)

Assistant coach(es)

- Kelsey Funderburgh (Walsh)
- Joe Haigh (Notre Dame)
- Maggie Tien (Washington Adventist)

Legend

- (C) Team captain
- (S) Suspended
- (I) Ineligible
- (W) Walk-on
- Injured
- Current redshirt

Roster
Last update: February 17, 2024

== Schedule and results ==
Date time, TV	Rank^{#}	Opponent^{#}	Result	Record	Site (attendance) city, state
Regular season
November 9, 2023*; 7:00 p.m.		at Howard	L 39–58	0–1	Burr Gymnasium (654); Washington, D.C.
November 15, 2023*; 7:00 p.m., ESPN+		at Navy	W 67–59 ^{OT}	1–1	Alumni Hall (302); Annapolis, MD
November 18, 2023*; 5:00 p.m., ESPN+		Cornell	L 47–52	1–2	Knott Arena (1,163); Emmitsburg, MD
November 22, 2023*; 12:00 p.m., NEC Front Row		at Fairleigh Dickinson	W 64–50	2–2	Bogota Savings Bank Center (150); Hackensack, NJ
November 29, 2023*; 6:00 p.m.		at Maryland Eastern Shore	L 52–69	2–3	Hytche Athletic Center (183); Princess Anne, MD
December 2, 2023*; 12:00 p.m., ESPN+		at Loyola (MD)	L 42–63	2–4	Reitz Arena (321); Baltimore, MD
December 5, 2023*; 7:00 p.m., ESPN+		Bucknell	W 55–46	3–4	Knott Arena (544); Emmitsburg, MD
December 9, 2023*; 1:00 p.m., ESPN+		George Mason	L 30–77	3–5	Knott Arena (624); Emmitsburg, MD
December 16, 2023; 2:00 p.m., ESPN+		at Fairfield	L 44–62	3–6 (0–1)	Leo D. Mahoney Arena (612); Fairfield, CT
December 18, 2023; 7:00 p.m., ESPN+		Siena	L 55–61	3–7 (0–2)	Knott Arena (227); Emmitsburg, MD
December 22, 2023*; 7:30 p.m., ESPN+		at No. 25 TCU	L 34–87	3–8	Schollmaier Arena (2,271); Fort Worth, TX
January 4, 2024; 11:00 a.m., ESPN+		at Canisius	L 49–62	3–9 (0–3)	Koessler Athletic Center (2,196); Buffalo, NY
January 6, 2024; 2:00 p.m., ESPN+		at Niagara	L 61–72	3–10 (0–4)	Gallagher Center (346); Lewiston, NY
January 11, 2024; 7:00 p.m., ESPN+		Quinnipiac	W 56–50	4–10 (1–4)	Knott Arena (285); Emmitsburg, MD
January 18, 2024; 7:00 p.m., ESPN+		Marist	L 44–45	4–11 (1–5)	Knott Arena (427); Emmitsburg, MD
January 20, 2024; 4:00 p.m., ESPN+		at Rider	W 60–53	5–11 (2–5)	Alumni Gymnasium (614); Lawrenceville, NJ
January 25, 2024; 1:00 p.m., ESPN+		at Saint Peter's	W 52–49	6–11 (3–5)	Run Baby Run Arena (–); Jersey City, NJ
January 27, 2024; 2:00 p.m., ESPN+		Niagara	L 63–80	6–12 (3–6)	Knott Arena (1,284); Emmitsburg, MD
February 1, 2024; 7:00 p.m., ESPN+		Iona	W 55–48	7–12 (4–6)	Knott Arena (304); Emmitsburg, MD
February 3, 2024; 2:00 p.m., ESPN+		at Manhattan	L 60–67	7–13 (4–7)	Draddy Gymnasium (317); Riverdale, NY
February 8, 2024; 4:00 p.m., ESPN+		Rider	W 64–43	8–13 (5–7)	Knott Arena (367); Emmitsburg, MD
February 10, 2024; 1:00 p.m., ESPN+		Canisius	W 70–56	9–13 (6–7)	Knott Arena (482); Emmitsburg, MD
February 15, 2024; 6:00 p.m., ESPN+		at Quinnipiac	W 54–45	10–13 (7–7)	M&T Bank Arena (389); Hamden, CT
February 17, 2024; 2:00 p.m., ESPN+		Fairfield	L 59–61	10–14 (7–8)	Knott Arena (391); Emmitsburg, MD
February 22, 2024; 7:00 p.m., ESPN+		at Marist	W 72–57	11–14 (8–8)	McCann Arena (710); Poughkeepsie, NY
February 24, 2024; 1:00 p.m., ESPN+		at Iona	L 56–62	11–15 (8–9)	Hynes Athletics Center (690); New Rochelle, NY
February 29, 2024; 7:00 p.m., ESPN+		Manhattan	L 43–58	11–16 (8–10)	Knott Arena (532); Emmitsburg, MD
March 2, 2024; 5:00 p.m., ESPN+		at Siena	L 56–65	11–17 (8–11)	UHY Center (858); Loudonville, NY
March 9, 2024; 1:00 p.m., ESPN+		Saint Peter's	W 56–46	12–17 (9–11)	Knott Arena (463); Emmitsburg, MD
MAAC tournament
March 12, 2024; 3:00 pm, ESPN+	(6)	vs. (11) Marist; First round	W 60–47	13–17	Boardwalk Hall; Atlantic City, NJ
March 14, 2024; 1:00 pm, ESPN+	(6)	vs. (3) Siena; Quarterfinal	L 57–80	13–18	Boardwalk Hall; Atlantic City, NJ
*Non-conference game. ^{#}Rankings from AP poll. (#) Tournament seedings in parentheses. All times are in Eastern.
