= 2023–24 Rider Broncs women's basketball team =

American college basketball season

2023–24 Rider Broncs women's basketball
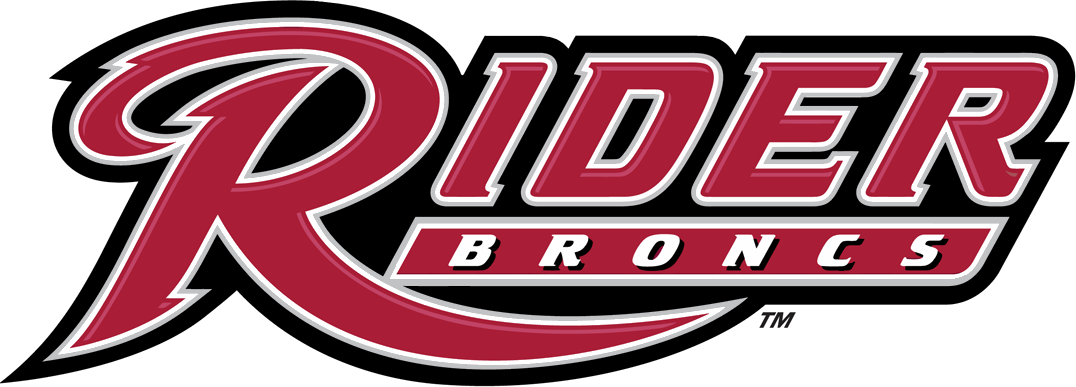
- Conference: Metro Atlantic Athletic Conference
- Record: 10–21 (6–14 MAAC)
- Head coach: Lynn Milligan (17th season)
- Assistant coaches: MyNeshia McKenzie; Sharay Hall; John Azzinaro
- Home arena: Alumni Gymnasium

2023–24 MAAC women's basketball standings
	Conf.				Overall
Team	W		L	PCT	W		L	PCT
Fairfield †	20	–	0	1.000	31	–	2	.939
Niagara	15	–	5	.750	21	–	14	.600
Siena	14	–	6	.700	18	–	12	.600
Manhattan	11	–	9	.550	18	–	12	.600
Canisius	11	–	9	.550	17	–	14	.548
Mount St. Mary's	10	–	10	.500	14	–	17	.452
Quinnipiac	9	–	11	.450	13	–	18	.419
Rider	6	–	14	.300	10	–	21	.323
Iona	6	–	14	.300	11	–	19	.367
Saint Peter's	4	–	16	.200	7	–	23	.233
Marist	4	–	16	.200	6	–	25	.194
† 2024 MAAC tournament winner

The 2023–24 Rider Broncs women's basketball team represented Rider University during the 2023–24 NCAA Division I women's basketball season. The Broncs, led by 17th-year head coach Lynn Milligan, played their home games at the Alumni Gymnasium in Lawrenceville, New Jersey as members of the Metro Atlantic Athletic Conference (MAAC).

== Previous season ==
The Broncs finished the 2022–23 season 10–21, 6–14 in MAAC play, to finish in a tie for ninth place. In the MAAC tournament, they upset Marist in the first round, before falling to Niagara in the quarterfinals.

== Roster ==
2023–24 Rider Broncs women's basketball team
Players
Coaches

Pos.	#	Name	Height	Year	Previous school	Hometown
G	0	Sanaa Redmond	5 ft 6 in (1.68 m)	Jr	Samford	Philadelphia, Pennsylvania
G	1	Aliya McIver	5 ft 9 in (1.75 m)	Fr	White Plains High School	White Plains, New York
F	2	ToniRenee Blanford	6 ft 0 in (1.83 m)	Sr	Union College	Montclair, New Jersey
G	3	Jamia Blake	5 ft 9 in (1.75 m)	Jr	UNC Asheville	Rock Hill, South Carolina
G	10	Molly Lynch	5 ft 9 in (1.75 m)	Sr	Rutgers Prep	Sea Girt, New Jersey
G	11	Mariona Cos-Morales	6 ft 1 in (1.85 m)	Jr	Casper College	Matadepera, Spain
G	12	Taylor Blunt	5 ft 8 in (1.73 m)	RS So	Detroit Mercy	Delco, Pennsylvania
F	13	Sam Richardson	6 ft 3 in (1.91 m)	Fr	St. Benedict's Prep	Linden, New Jersey
F	14	Sofie Bruintjes	6 ft 5 in (1.96 m)	Sr	CTO Amsterdam	Zwolle, Netherlands
G	23	Taylor Langan	5 ft 10 in (1.78 m)	GS	Millersville	Lake Hopatcong, New Jersey
G	24	Makayla Firebaugh	5 ft 10 in (1.78 m)	Sr	James Wood High School	Winchester, Virginia
C	44	Kaylan Deveney	6 ft 3 in (1.91 m)	Fr	Life Center Academy	Medford, New Jersey
G	55	Jessika Schiffer	5 ft 9 in (1.75 m)	GS	Buffalo	Iserlohn, Germany

Head coach

- Lynn Milligan (Rider)

Assistant coach(es)

- MyNeshia McKenzie (Rider)
- Sharay Hall (Lock Haven)
- John Azzinaro (Bucknell)

Legend

- (C) Team captain
- (S) Suspended
- (I) Ineligible
- (W) Walk-on
- Injured
- Current redshirt

Roster
Last update: February 17, 2024

== Schedule and results ==
Date time, TV	Rank^{#}	Opponent^{#}	Result	Record	Site (attendance) city, state
Exhibition
November 1, 2023*; 7:00 p.m.		TCNJ	W 63–50	–	Alumni Gymnasium (788); Lawrenceville, NJ
Regular season
November 7, 2023*; 7:00 p.m., ESPN+		at Saint Joseph's	L 49–71	0–1	Hagan Arena (650); Philadelphia, PA
November 12, 2023*; 5:00 p.m., ESPN+		Merrimack	W 61–47	1–1	Alumni Gymnasium (518); Lawrenceville, NJ
November 15, 2023*; 7:00 p.m., ESPN+		at NJIT	L 57–70	1–2	Wellness and Events Center (240); Newark, NJ
November 18, 2023*; 2:00 p.m., ESPN+		Boston University	W 58–55	2–2	Alumni Gymnasium (686); Lawrenceville, NJ
November 21, 2023*; 7:00 p.m., ESPN+		La Salle	L 44–72	2–3	Alumni Gymnasium (516); Lawrenceville, NJ
November 26, 2023*; 2:00 p.m., NEC Front Row		at Fairleigh Dickinson	L 59–64	2–4	Bogota Savings Bank Center (327); Hackensack, NJ
December 2, 2023*; 2:00 p.m., ESPN+		Monmouth	L 42–62	2–5	Alumni Gymnasium (572); Lawrenceville, NJ
December 6, 2023*; 7:00 p.m., ACCNX		at Virginia	L 51–78	2–6	John Paul Jones Arena (3,676); Charlottesville, VA
December 16, 2023; 2:00 p.m., ESPN+		at Manhattan	L 39–73	2–7 (0–1)	Draddy Gymnasium (202); Riverdale, NY
December 18, 2023; 7:00 p.m., ESPN+		Quinnipiac	L 57–60	2–8 (0–2)	Alumni Gymnasium (354); Lawrenceville, NJ
December 30, 2023*; 2:00 p.m., ESPN+		at Lehigh	W 67–57 ^{OT}	3–8	Stabler Arena (569); Bethlehem, PA
January 4, 2024; 7:00 p.m., ESPN+		Iona	W 63–56	4–8 (1–2)	Alumni Gymnasium (511); Lawrenceville, NJ
January 11, 2024; 7:00 p.m., ESPN+		at Marist	L 55–65	4–9 (1–3)	McCann Arena (702); Poughkeepsie, NY
January 13, 2024; 2:00 p.m., ESPN+		Canisius	W 76–63	5–9 (2–3)	Alumni Gymnasium (896); Lawrenceville, NJ
January 18, 2024; 7:00 p.m., ESPN+		at Siena	L 58–79	5–10 (2–4)	UHY Center (441); Loudonville, NY
January 20, 2024; 4:00 p.m., ESPN+		Mount St. Mary's	L 53–60	5–11 (2–5)	Alumni Gymnasium (614); Lawrenceville, NJ
January 25, 2024; 7:00 p.m., ESPN+		Niagara	L 62–81	5–12 (2–6)	Alumni Gymnasium (486); Lawrenceville, NJ
January 27, 2024; 2:00 p.m., ESPN+		at Saint Peter's	L 58–68	5–13 (2–7)	Run Baby Run Arena (–); Jersey City, NJ
February 1, 2024; 7:00 p.m., ESPN+		Fairfield	L 44–67	5–14 (2–8)	Alumni Gymnasium (678); Lawrenceville, NJ
February 3, 2024; 1:00 p.m., ESPN+		at Quinnipiac	L 54–65	5–15 (2–9)	M&T Bank Arena (412); Hamden, CT
February 8, 2024; 4:00 p.m., ESPN+		at Mount St. Mary's	L 43–64	5–16 (2–10)	Knott Arena (367); Emmitsburg, MD
February 10, 2024; 2:00 p.m., ESPN+		Manhattan	W 58–54	6–16 (3–10)	Alumni Gymnasium (494); Lawrenceville, NJ
February 15, 2024; 6:00 p.m., ESPNU/ESPN+		at Iona	W 45–43	7–16 (4–10)	Hynes Athletics Center (600); New Rochelle, NY
February 22, 2024; 7:00 p.m., ESPN+		Saint Peter's	W 59–48	8–16 (5–10)	Alumni Gymnasium (591); Lawrenceville, NJ
February 24, 2024; 1:00 p.m., ESPN+		Marist	W 62–61 ^{OT}	9–16 (6–10)	Alumni Gymnasium (848); Lawrenceville, NJ
February 29, 2024; 6:00 p.m., ESPN+		at Niagara	L 56–75	9–17 (6–11)	Gallagher Center (584); Lewiston, NY
March 2, 2024; 1:00 p.m., ESPN+		at Canisius	L 62–73	9–18 (6–12)	Koessler Athletic Center (693); Buffalo, NY
March 7, 2024; 5:00 p.m., ESPN+		Siena	L 40–77	9–19 (6–13)	Alumni Gymnasium (589); Lawrenceville, NJ
March 9, 2024; 2:00 p.m., ESPN+		at No. 25 Fairfield	L 54–83	9–20 (6–14)	Leo D. Mahoney Arena (1,525); Fairfield, CT
MAAC tournament
March 12, 2024; 10:30 a.m., ESPN+	(8)	vs. (9) Iona; First round	W 66–56	10–20	Boardwalk Hall; Atlantic City, NJ
March 13, 2024; 1:00 p.m., ESPN+	(8)	vs. (1) No. 25 Fairfield; Second round	L 51–57	10–21	Boardwalk Hall; Atlantic City, NJ
*Non-conference game. ^{#}Rankings from AP poll. (#) Tournament seedings in parentheses. All times are in Eastern.
