= 2023–24 Canisius Golden Griffins women's basketball team =

American college basketball season

2023–24 Canisius Golden Griffins women's basketball
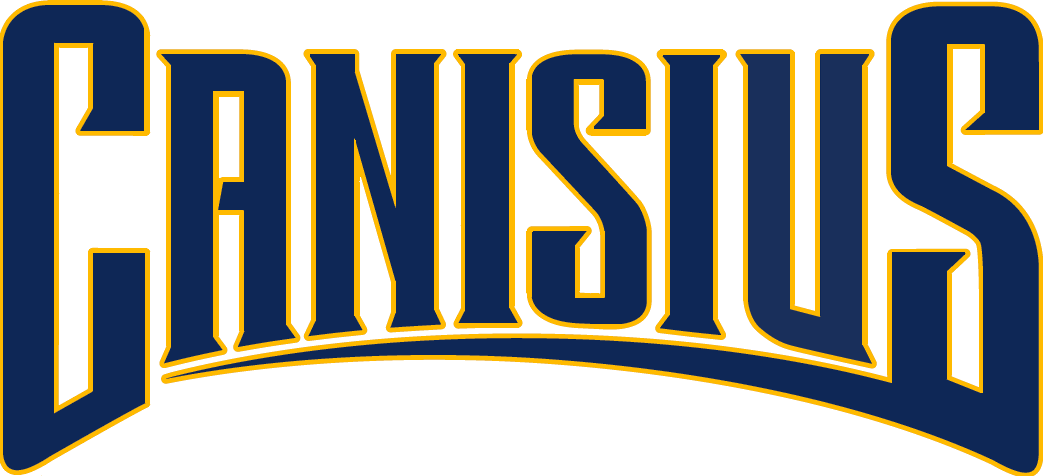
- Conference: Metro Atlantic Athletic Conference
- Record: 17–14 (11–9 MAAC)
- Head coach: Sahar Nusseibeh (3rd season)
- Assistant coaches: Krista Beechy; Shareese Ulis-McBrayer; Meg Cunningham
- Home arena: Koessler Athletic Center

2023–24 MAAC women's basketball standings
	Conf.				Overall
Team	W		L	PCT	W		L	PCT
Fairfield †	20	–	0	1.000	31	–	2	.939
Niagara	15	–	5	.750	21	–	14	.600
Siena	14	–	6	.700	18	–	12	.600
Manhattan	11	–	9	.550	18	–	12	.600
Canisius	11	–	9	.550	17	–	14	.548
Mount St. Mary's	10	–	10	.500	14	–	17	.452
Quinnipiac	9	–	11	.450	13	–	18	.419
Rider	6	–	14	.300	10	–	21	.323
Iona	6	–	14	.300	11	–	19	.367
Saint Peter's	4	–	16	.200	7	–	23	.233
Marist	4	–	16	.200	6	–	25	.194
† 2024 MAAC tournament winner

The 2023–24 Canisius Golden Griffins women's basketball team represented Canisius University during the 2023–24 NCAA Division I women's basketball season. The Golden Griffins, led by second-year head coach Sahar Nusseibeh, played their home games at the Koessler Athletic Center in Buffalo, New York as members of the Metro Atlantic Athletic Conference (MAAC).

== Previous season ==
The Golden Griffins finished the 2022–23 season 9–21, 6–14 in MAAC play, to finish in a tie for ninth place. In the MAAC tournament, they were defeated by Mount St. Mary's in the first round.

== Roster ==
2023–24 Canisius Golden Griffins women's basketball team
Players
Coaches

Pos.	#	Name	Height	Year	Previous school	Hometown
G	0	Saige Randolph	5 ft 5 in (1.65 m)	Fr	Albany Academy for Girls	Albany, NY
G	1	Mary Copple	5 ft 7 in (1.7 m)	Fr	Brighton High School	Brighton, MI
G	2	Mackenzie Amalia	5 ft 5 in (1.65 m)	Sr	Robert Morris	Beaver Falls, PA
G/F	3	Brooklyn Thrash	6 ft 0 in (1.83 m)	So	Elmwood High School	Wayne, OH
G	5	Athina Lexa	5 ft 9 in (1.75 m)	Jr	Hellenic College	Thessaloniki, Greece
G	10	Giana Hernandez-Boulden	6 ft 1 in (1.85 m)	Sr	Rhode Island	Hamilton, NJ
G	11	Grace Heeps	5 ft 11 in (1.8 m)	GS	Albany	East Greenbush, NY
G	13	Xanthippi Karatasiou	5 ft 9 in (1.75 m)	Jr	High School of Kontariotissa	Katerini, Greece
F	14	Sisi Eleko	6 ft 2 in (1.88 m)	So	New Hope Academy	Montreal, QC
G	20	Jane McCauley	5 ft 9 in (1.75 m)	GS	Vermont	New Rochelle, NY
G	22	Bri Rozzi	5 ft 7 in (1.7 m)	GS	Loyola (MD)	Highland, NY
F	23	Adrien LaMora	5 ft 11 in (1.8 m)	So	Indian River High School	Philadelphia, NY
F	34	Chloe Chard Peloquin	6 ft 3 in (1.91 m)	So	Newark Catholic High School	Johnstown, OH
F	45	Tihanna Fulton	6 ft 0 in (1.83 m)	GS	Miami (OH)	Mason, OH

Head coach

- Sahar Nusseibeh (American)

Assistant coach(es)

- Krista Beechy (Grove City)
- Shareese Ulis-McBrayer (Cincinnati)
- Meg Cunningham (West Chester)

Legend

- (C) Team captain
- (S) Suspended
- (I) Ineligible
- (W) Walk-on
- Injured
- Current redshirt

Roster
Last update: February 17, 2024

== Schedule and results ==
Date time, TV	Rank^{#}	Opponent^{#}	Result	Record	Site (attendance) city, state
Regular season
November 6, 2023*; 5:00 p.m., ESPN+		at Buffalo	L 60–69	0–1	Alumni Arena (1,229); Amherst, NY
November 11, 2023*; 1:00 p.m., ESPN+		Saint Francis	W 78–62	1–1	Koessler Athletic Center (649); Buffalo, NY
November 16, 2023*; 7:00 p.m., ESPN+		at Colgate	L 55–61 ^{OT}	1–2	Cotterell Court (262); Hamilton, NY
November 20, 2023*; 5:00 p.m., ESPN+		D'Youville	W 67–59	2–2	Koessler Athletic Center (–); Buffalo, NY
November 26, 2023*; 2:00 p.m., B1G+		at Illinois	L 58–90	2–3	State Farm Center (2,962); Champaign, IL
November 30, 2023*; 7:00 p.m., ESPN+		at St. Bonaventure	W 63–56	3–3	Reilly Center (321); St. Bonaventure, NY
December 8, 2023*; 6:00 p.m., ESPN+		at Binghamton	W 71–64	4–3	Binghamton University Events Center (1,027); Vestal, NY
December 16, 2023; 2:00 p.m., ESPN+		at Siena	W 65–63	5–3 (1–0)	UHY Center (512); Loudonville, NY
December 18, 2023; 11:00 a.m., ESPN+		at Marist	W 67–62	6–3 (2–0)	McCann Arena (742); Poughkeepsie, NY
December 21, 2023*; 11:00 a.m., ESPN+		at Youngstown State	W 65–59	7–3	Beeghly Center (2,251); Youngstown, OH
December 30, 2023*; 1:00 p.m., ESPN+		Akron	L 48–53	7–4	Koessler Athletic Center (520); Buffalo, NY
January 4, 2024; 11:00 a.m., ESPN+		Mount St. Mary's	W 62–49	8–4 (3–0)	Koessler Athletic Center (2,196); Buffalo, NY
January 6, 2024; 1:00 p.m., ESPN+		Fairfield	L 51–64	8–5 (3–1)	Koessler Athletic Center (404); Buffalo, NY
January 11, 2024; 7:00 p.m., ESPN+		at Saint Peter's	W 59–44	9–5 (4–1)	Run Baby Run Arena (257); Jersey City, NJ
January 13, 2024; 2:00 p.m., ESPN+		at Rider	L 63–76	9–6 (4–2)	Alumni Gymnasium (896); Lawrenceville, NJ
January 18, 2024; 6:00 p.m., ESPN+		Quinnipiac	W 69–58	10–6 (5–2)	Koessler Athletic Center (372); Buffalo, NY
January 20, 2024; 1:00 p.m., ESPN+		Manhattan	L 55–58	10–7 (5–3)	Koessler Athletic Center (385); Buffalo, NY
January 25, 2024; 7:00 p.m., ESPN+		at Iona	W 53–43	11–7 (6–3)	Hynes Athletics Center (787); New Rochelle, NY
January 27, 2024; 2:00 p.m., ESPN+		at Fairfield	L 42–70	11–8 (6–4)	Leo D. Mahoney Arena (1,315); Fairfield, CT
January 30, 2024; 6:00 p.m., ESPN+		Niagara	L 55–65	11–9 (6–5)	Koessler Athletic Center (601); Buffalo, NY
February 3, 2024; 1:00 p.m., ESPN+		Saint Peter's	W 56–48	12–9 (7–5)	Koessler Athletic Center (621); Buffalo, NY
February 10, 2024; 1:00 p.m., ESPN+		at Mount St. Mary's	L 56–70	12–10 (7–6)	Knott Arena (482); Emmitsburg, MD
February 15, 2024; 6:00 p.m., ESPN+		Marist	W 68–52	13–10 (8–6)	Koessler Athletic Center (536); Buffalo, NY
February 17, 2024; 1:00 p.m., ESPN+		Siena	W 71–64	14–10 (9–6)	Koessler Athletic Center (593); Buffalo, NY
February 22, 2024; 7:00 p.m., ESPN+		at Manhattan	L 51–54	14–11 (9–7)	Draddy Gymnasium (337); Riverdale, NY
February 24, 2024; 2:00 p.m., ESPN+		at Quinnipiac	W 69–53	15–11 (10–7)	M&T Bank Arena (623); Hamden, CT
February 29, 2024; 6:00 p.m., ESPN+		Iona	L 58–71	15–12 (10–8)	Koessler Athletic Center (742); Buffalo, NY
March 2, 2024; 1:00 p.m., ESPN+		Rider	W 73–62	16–12 (11–8)	Koessler Athletic Center (693); Buffalo, NY
March 9, 2024; 2:00 p.m., ESPN+		at Niagara	L 50–84	16–13 (11–9)	Gallagher Center (323); Lewiston, NY
MAAC tournament
March 14, 2024; 3:30 pm, ESPN+	(5)	vs. (4) Manhattan; Quarterfinals	W 58–55	17–13	Boardwalk Hall; Atlantic City, NJ
March 15, 2024; 11:00 am, ESPN+	(5)	vs. (1) No. 25 Fairfield; Semifinals	L 64–77	17–14	Boardwalk Hall; Atlantic City, NJ
*Non-conference game. ^{#}Rankings from AP poll. (#) Tournament seedings in parentheses. All times are in Eastern.
