= 2023–24 Niagara Purple Eagles women's basketball team =

American college basketball season

2023–24 Niagara Purple Eagles women's basketball

WNIT, second round
- Conference: Metro Atlantic Athletic Conference
- Record: 21–14 (15–5 MAAC)
- Head coach: Jada Pierce (9th season)
- Associate head coach: Brianna Chambers; Lester Harbin
- Assistant coach: Kayla DeCriscio
- Home arena: Gallagher Center

2023–24 MAAC women's basketball standings
| | Conf. | | | | Overall |
| Team | W | | L | PCT | W | | L | PCT |
|---|---|---|---|---|---|---|---|---|
| Fairfield † | 20 | – | 0 | 1.000 | 31 | – | 2 | .939 |
| Niagara | 15 | – | 5 | .750 | 21 | – | 14 | .600 |
| Siena | 14 | – | 6 | .700 | 18 | – | 12 | .600 |
| Manhattan | 11 | – | 9 | .550 | 18 | – | 12 | .600 |
| Canisius | 11 | – | 9 | .550 | 17 | – | 14 | .548 |
| Mount St. Mary's | 10 | – | 10 | .500 | 14 | – | 17 | .452 |
| Quinnipiac | 9 | – | 11 | .450 | 13 | – | 18 | .419 |
| Rider | 6 | – | 14 | .300 | 10 | – | 21 | .323 |
| Iona | 6 | – | 14 | .300 | 11 | – | 19 | .367 |
| Saint Peter's | 4 | – | 16 | .200 | 7 | – | 23 | .233 |
| Marist | 4 | – | 16 | .200 | 6 | – | 25 | .194 |
† 2024 MAAC tournament winner

The 2023–24 Niagara Purple Eagles women's basketball team represented Niagara University during the 2023–24 NCAA Division I women's basketball season. The Purple Eagles, led by ninth-year head coach Jada Pierce, played their home games at the Gallagher Center in Lewiston, New York as members of the Metro Atlantic Athletic Conference (MAAC).

The Purple Eagles finished the season 21–14, 15–5 in MAAC play, to finish in second place. They defeated Quinnipiac and Siena before falling to top-seeded Fairfield in the MAAC tournament championship game. They received an at-large bid to the WNIT, where they defeated Le Moyne in the first round before falling to Vermont in the second round.

== Previous season ==
The Purple Eagles finished the 2022–23 season 18–13, 16–4 in MAAC play, to finish in a tie for second place. In the MAAC tournament, they defeated Rider in the quarterfinals, before being upset by Manhattan in the semifinals. They received an automatic bid into the WNIT, where they would be defeated by Green Bay in the first round.

== Roster ==
2023–24 Niagara Purple Eagles women's basketball team
Players
Coaches

| Pos. | # | Name | Height | Year | Previous school | Hometown |
|---|---|---|---|---|---|---|
| G | 0 | Chardonnay Hartley | 5 ft 3 in (1.6 m) | So | Longwood | Harlem, NY |
| G | 1 | Shelby Fiddler | 5 ft 9 in (1.75 m) | So | Patrick Henry High School | Roanoke, VA |
| G | 3 | Lexie Roe | 5 ft 7 in (1.7 m) | Jr | Fayetteville–Manlius High School | Manlius, NY |
| G | 4 | Ary Hicks | 5 ft 5 in (1.65 m) | So | Charlotte High School | Punta Gorda, FL |
| G | 5 | Aaliyah Parker | 5 ft 9 in (1.75 m) | Jr | Cardinal O'Hara High School | Cheektowaga, NY |
| F | 10 | Amelia Strong | 6 ft 2 in (1.88 m) | So | Cardinal O'Hara High School | Niagara Falls, NY |
| G | 11 | Angel Parker | 5 ft 5 in (1.65 m) | GS | Cardinal O'Hara High School | Cheektowaga, NY |
| G | 13 | Destiny Strother | 5 ft 9 in (1.75 m) | GS | Pittsburgh | Flint, MI |
| G/F | 14 | Alyssa Rossignol | 5 ft 11 in (1.8 m) | Fr | Enfield High School | Enfield, CT |
| F | 15 | Kylie Buckley | 6 ft 1 in (1.85 m) | Fr | Livonia High School | Livonia, NY |
| G | 20 | Marlie Dickerson | 5 ft 10 in (1.78 m) | So | Central Dauphin High School | Harrisburg, PA |
| G | 21 | Lore Porter | 5 ft 9 in (1.75 m) | Sr | New Hope Academy | Woodbridge, VA |
| F | 23 | Jade Rutledge | 5 ft 10 in (1.78 m) | So | Cardinal O'Hara High School | Buffalo, NY |
| F | 25 | Saige Glover | 6 ft 0 in (1.83 m) | Sr | Northland High School | Columbus, OH |

Head coach

- Jada Pierce (West Chester)

Assistant coach(es)

- Brianna Chambers (Cal State Bakersfield)
- Lester Harbin (Lees–McRae)
- Kayla DeCriscio (Pitt–Johnstown)

Legend

- (C) Team captain
- (S) Suspended
- (I) Ineligible
- (W) Walk-on
- Injured
- Current redshirt

Roster
Last update: February 14, 2024

== Schedule and results ==
| Date time, TV | Rank^{#} | Opponent^{#} | Result | Record | Site (attendance) city, state |
Exhibition
| November 1, 2023*; 6:00 p.m. | | Mercyhurst | W 91–61 | – | Gallagher Center (301); Lewiston, NY |
Regular season
| November 8, 2023*; 6:00 p.m., ESPN+ | | St. Bonaventure | W 75–51 | 1–0 | Gallagher Center (588); Lewiston, NY |
| November 11, 2023*; 1:00 p.m., ESPN+ | | Duquesne | L 79–82 | 1–1 | Gallagher Center (459); Lewiston, NY |
| November 14, 2023*; 6:00 p.m., ESPN+ | | at Buffalo | L 75–92 | 1–2 | Alumni Arena (1,376); Amherst, NY |
| November 19, 2023*; 1:00 p.m., ESPN+ | | Stonehill | W 71–69 | 2–2 | Gallagher Center (397); Lewiston, NY |
| November 24, 2023*; 1:30 p.m., FloHoops | | vs. No. 7 LSU; Cayman Islands Classic | L 65–99 | 2–3 | John Gray Gymnasium (300); George Town, Cayman Islands |
| November 25, 2023*; 1:30 p.m., FloHoops | | vs. No. 2 UCLA; Cayman Islands Classic | L 46–97 | 2–4 | John Gray Gymnasium (300); George Town, Cayman Islands |
| November 29, 2023*; 7:00 p.m., B1G+ | | at Maryland | L 44–114 | 2–5 | Xfinity Center (5,064); College Park, MD |
| December 2, 2023*; 2:00 p.m., ESPN+ | | Radford | W 64–53 | 3–5 | Gallagher Center (402); Lewiston, NY |
| December 6, 2023*; 7:00 p.m., ESPN+ | | at Cleveland State | L 56–87 | 3–6 | Wolstein Center (303); Cleveland, OH |
| December 16, 2023; 1:00 p.m., ESPN+ | | at Iona | W 67–48 | 4–6 (1–0) | Hynes Athletics Center (316); New Rochelle, NY |
| December 18, 2023; 7:00 p.m., ESPN+ | | at Saint Peter's | W 74–57 | 5–6 (2–0) | Run Baby Run Arena (330); Jersey City, NJ |
| December 21, 2023*; 2:00 p.m., ESPN+ | | at West Virginia | L 52–103 | 5–7 | WVU Coliseum (1,304); Morgantown, WV |
| January 4, 2024; 11:00 a.m., ESPN+ | | Fairfield | L 54–77 | 5–8 (2–1) | Gallagher Center (1,754); Lewiston, NY |
| January 6, 2024; 2:00 p.m., ESPN+ | | Mount St. Mary's | W 72–61 | 6–8 (3–1) | Gallagher Center (346); Lewiston, NY |
| January 11, 2024; 11:00 a.m., ESPN+ | | at Siena | L 64–66 | 6–9 (3–2) | UHY Center (1,058); Loudonville, NY |
| January 13, 2024; 4:00 p.m., ESPN+ | | at Marist | L 60–61 | 6–10 (3–3) | McCann Arena (738); Poughkeepsie, NY |
| January 18, 2024; 6:00 p.m., ESPN+ | | Manhattan | L 53–64 | 6–11 (3–4) | Gallagher Center (436); Lewiston, NY |
| January 20, 2024; 2:00 p.m., ESPN+ | | Quinnipiac | W 86–78 ^{OT} | 7–11 (4–4) | Gallagher Center (487); Lewiston, NY |
| January 25, 2024; 7:00 p.m., ESPN+ | | at Rider | W 81–62 | 8–11 (5–4) | Alumni Gymnasium (486); Lawrenceville, NJ |
| January 27, 2024; 2:00 p.m., ESPN+ | | at Mount St. Mary's | W 80–63 | 9–11 (6–4) | Knott Arena (1,284); Emmitsburg, MD |
| January 30, 2024; 6:00 p.m., ESPN+ | | at Canisius; Battle of the Bridge | W 65–55 | 10–11 (7–4) | Koessler Athletic Center (601); Buffalo, NY |
| February 1, 2024; 6:00 p.m., ESPN+ | | Saint Peter's | W 85–51 | 11–11 (8–4) | Gallagher Center (312); Lewiston, NY |
| February 8, 2024; 7:00 p.m., ESPN+ | | at Manhattan | W 88–63 | 12–11 (9–4) | Draddy Gymnasium (247); Riverdale, NY |
| February 15, 2024; 6:00 p.m., ESPN+ | | Siena | W 84–70 | 13–11 (10–4) | Gallagher Center (336); Lewiston, NY |
| February 17, 2024; 2:00 p.m., ESPN+ | | Marist | W 90–64 | 14–11 (11–4) | Gallagher Center (472); Lewiston, NY |
| February 22, 2024; 6:00 p.m., ESPN+ | | at Quinnipiac | W 66–60 ^{OT} | 15–11 (12–4) | M&T Bank Arena (421); Hamden, CT |
| February 24, 2024; 2:00 p.m., ESPN+ | | at Fairfield | L 65–95 | 15–12 (12–5) | Leo D. Mahoney Arena (1,624); Fairfield, CT |
| February 29, 2024; 6:00 p.m., ESPN+ | | Rider | W 75–56 | 16–12 (13–5) | Gallagher Center (584); Lewiston, NY |
| March 2, 2024; 2:00 p.m., ESPN+ | | Iona | W 86–56 | 17–12 (14–5) | Gallagher Center (405); Lewiston, NY |
| March 9, 2024; 2:00 p.m., ESPN+ | | Canisius; Battle of the Bridge | W 84–50 | 18–12 (15–5) | Gallagher Center (323); Lewiston, NY |
MAAC tournament
| March 13, 2024; 3:30 p.m., ESPN+ | (2) | vs. (7) Quinnipiac; Quarterfinals | W 70–56 | 19–12 | Boardwalk Hall (896); Atlantic City, NJ |
| March 15, 2024; 1:30 p.m., ESPN+ | (2) | vs. (3) Siena; Semifinals | W 87–70 | 20–12 | Boardwalk Hall; Atlantic City, NJ |
| March 16, 2024; 3:30 p.m., ESPNU | (2) | vs. (1) Fairfield; Championship | L 62–70 ^{OT} | 20–13 | Boardwalk Hall (1,007); Atlantic City, NJ |
WNIT
| March 22, 2024; 7:00 p.m., ESPN+ | | Le Moyne; First round | W 91–86 | 21–13 | Gallagher Center (809); Lewiston, NY |
| March 25, 2024; 6:00 p.m., ESPN+ | | at Vermont; Second round | L 63–69 | 21–14 | Patrick Gym (781); Burlington, VT |
*Non-conference game. ^{#}Rankings from AP poll. (#) Tournament seedings in parentheses. All times are in Eastern.
