= Kay Yow Award =

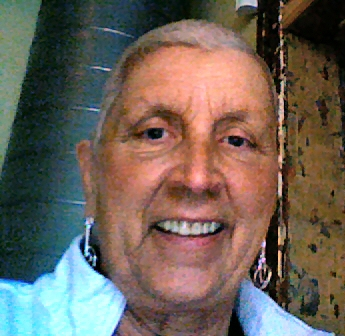
- Kay Yow
- Awarded for: the nation's top women's coach in NCAA Division I basketball who also displays great character off the court
- Country: United States
- Presented by: Collegeinsider.com
- First award: 2010
- Currently held by: Jory Collins
- Website: https://www.kayyowaward.com

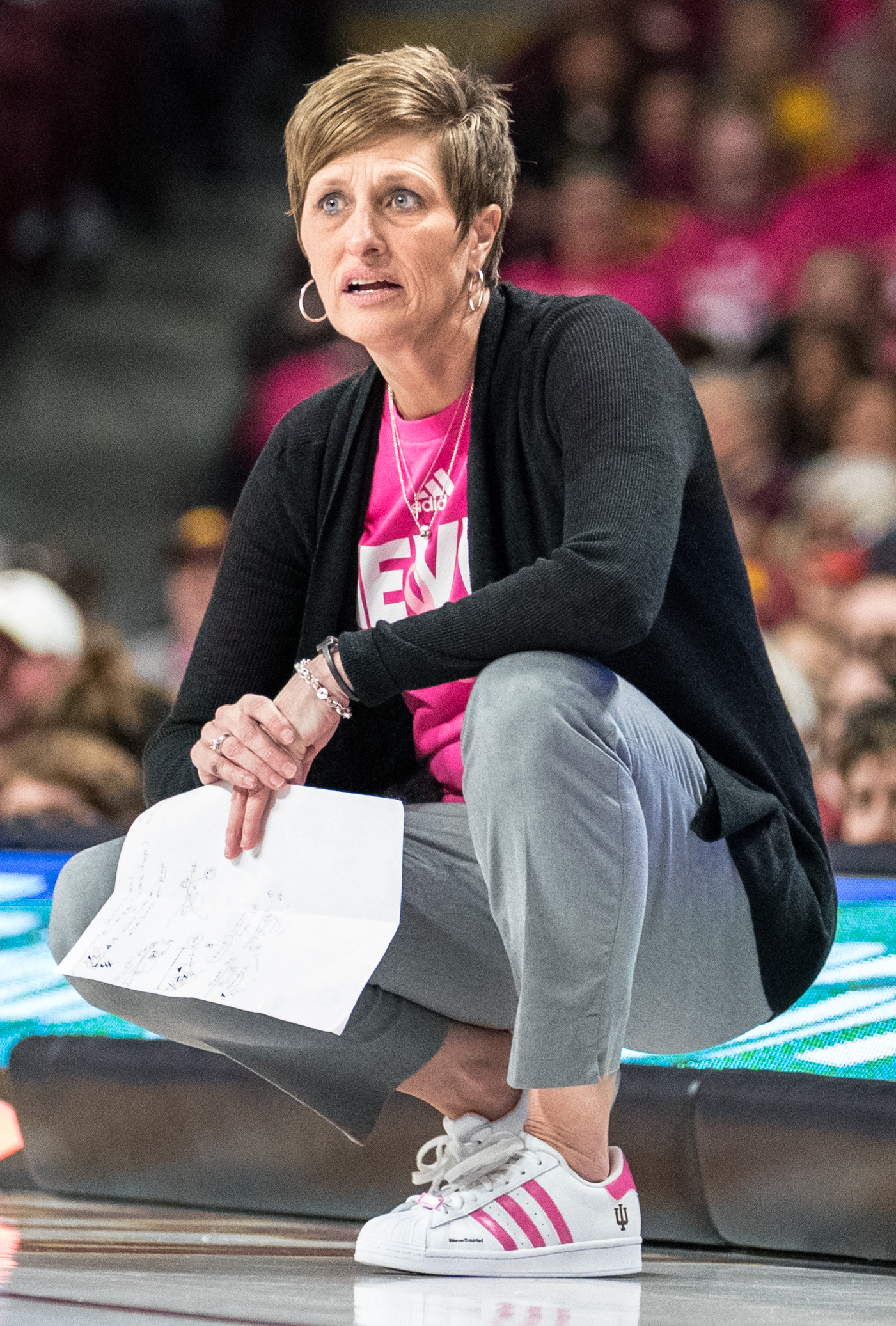
Teri Moren, the 2022–23 winner

The Kay Yow National Coach of the Year Award is an award given annually to the women's college basketball head coach in NCAA Division I competition who displays great character both on and off the court. The award was established in 2010 and is named for legendary women's head coach Kay Yow, who coached at NC State from 1975 to 2009 before succumbing to stage 4 breast cancer. Yow was diagnosed with breast cancer in 1987 but still continued to coach until the illness forced her to take a medical leave of absence in early 2009. Yow accumulated over 700 wins as a head coach, and also led the United States women's basketball team to an Olympic gold medal in 1988.

== Selection ==
The award is presented to the coach who has exhibited great personal character both as a coach and as a person. A committee of 26 members, ranging from women's basketball analysts, former and current head coaches, and Yow's three siblings (sisters Deborah and Susan, and brother Ronnie), chooses the winner among a field of finalists.

== Winners ==
*	Awarded the Naismith College Coach of the Year the same season
Coach (X)	Denotes the number of times the coach has been awarded the Kay Yow Award

Year	Coach	School	Record	Postseason result	Reference
2009–10	Connie Yori*	Nebraska	32–2	NCAA Sweet 16	
2010–11	Matt Bollant	Green Bay	34–2	NCAA Sweet 16	
2011–12	Karl Smesko	Florida Gulf Coast	29–3	NCAA first round	
2012–13	Katie Abrahamson-Henderson	Albany	27–4	NCAA first round	
2013–14	David Six	Hampton	28–4	NCAA first round	
2014–15	Tricia Fabbri	Quinnipiac	31–4	NCAA first round	
2015–16	Brian Boyer	Arkansas State	27–6	WNIT second round	
2016–17	Maureen Magarity	New Hampshire	26–6	WNIT first round	
2017–18	Sue Guevara	Central Michigan	30–5	NCAA Sweet 16	
2018–19	Kellie Harper	Missouri State	25–10	NCAA Sweet Sixteen	
2019–20	Brian Giorgis	Marist	26–4	Canceled	
2020–21	Jarrod Olson	California Baptist	26–1	WNIT Quarterfinal	
2021–22	Dawn Plitzuweit	South Dakota	29–6	NCAA Sweet Sixteen	
2022–23	Teri Moren	Indiana	28–4	NCAA second round	
2023–24	Carly Thibault-DuDonis	Fairfield	31–2	NCAA first round	
2024–25	Larry Vickers	Norfolk State	30–5	NCAA first round	
2025–26	Jory Collins	North Dakota State	29–5	WBIT second round	

== See also ==
- Clair Bee Coach of the Year Award – a character award given to an NCAA Division I men's basketball coach
- Skip Prosser Man of the Year Award – an annual award given to an NCAA Division I men's basketball coach who exhibits moral character off the court; the award is also presented by CollegeInsider.com
