= 2023–24 Siena Saints women's basketball team =

American college basketball season

2023–24 Siena Saints women's basketball
- Conference: Metro Atlantic Athletic Conference
- Record: 14–11 (11–6 MAAC)
- Head coach: Jim Jabir (3rd season)
- Assistant coaches: Terry Primm; Heather Stec; Sydnie Rosales
- Home arena: UHY Center

2023–24 MAAC women's basketball standings
| | Conf. | | | | Overall |
| Team | W | | L | PCT | W | | L | PCT |
|---|---|---|---|---|---|---|---|---|
| Fairfield † | 20 | – | 0 | 1.000 | 31 | – | 2 | .939 |
| Niagara | 15 | – | 5 | .750 | 21 | – | 14 | .600 |
| Siena | 14 | – | 6 | .700 | 18 | – | 12 | .600 |
| Manhattan | 11 | – | 9 | .550 | 18 | – | 12 | .600 |
| Canisius | 11 | – | 9 | .550 | 17 | – | 14 | .548 |
| Mount St. Mary's | 10 | – | 10 | .500 | 14 | – | 17 | .452 |
| Quinnipiac | 9 | – | 11 | .450 | 13 | – | 18 | .419 |
| Rider | 6 | – | 14 | .300 | 10 | – | 21 | .323 |
| Iona | 6 | – | 14 | .300 | 11 | – | 19 | .367 |
| Saint Peter's | 4 | – | 16 | .200 | 7 | – | 23 | .233 |
| Marist | 4 | – | 16 | .200 | 6 | – | 25 | .194 |
† 2024 MAAC tournament winner

The 2023–24 Siena Saints women's basketball team represented Siena College during the 2023–24 NCAA Division I women's basketball season. The Saints, led by third-year head coach Jim Jabir, played their home games at the UHY Center in Loudonville, New York as members of the Metro Atlantic Athletic Conference.

== Previous season ==
The Saints finished the 2022–23 season 19–13, 12–8 in MAAC play to finish in fourth place. In the MAAC tournament, they defeated Fairfield in the quarterfinals, before falling to top-seeded and eventual tournament champions Iona in the semifinals.

== Roster ==
2023–24 Siena Saints women's basketball team
Players
Coaches

| Pos. | # | Name | Height | Year | Previous school | Hometown |
|---|---|---|---|---|---|---|
| G | 0 | Ahniysha Jackson | 5 ft 7 in (1.7 m) | Sr | Albany | Watervliet, New York |
| G | 1 | Nikola Zdenkova | 5 ft 9 in (1.75 m) | RS Fr | Gymnázium Prípotocní | Karlovy Vary, Czech Republic |
| G | 3 | London Gamble | 5 ft 8 in (1.73 m) | So | Westlake High School | Westlake Village, California |
| G | 4 | Valencia Fontenelle-Posson | 5 ft 10 in (1.78 m) | Jr | Guilderland High School | Guilderland, New York |
| G | 7 | Teresa Seppala | 6 ft 0 in (1.83 m) | So | Mäkelänrinteen lukio | Tampere, Finland |
| F | 10 | Constance Ogbeide | 6 ft 1 in (1.85 m) | Fr | INS Almata | Lleida, Spain |
| G | 11 | Ciany Conyers | 5 ft 8 in (1.73 m) | Fr | Taconic High School | Pittsfield, Massachusetts |
| G | 12 | Alden Yergey | 5 ft 9 in (1.75 m) | Fr | Brentsville District High School | Nokesville, Virginia |
| G | 13 | Esther Rodellar | 5 ft 9 in (1.75 m) | Fr | Institut Can Mas | Ripollet, Spain |
| F | 21 | Anajah Brown | 6 ft 1 in (1.85 m) | Jr | The Baldwin School | Norristown, Pennsylvania |
| G | 24 | Elisa Mevius | 5 ft 10 in (1.78 m) | So | Theo-Koch School | Rendsburg, Germany |
| F | 25 | Eszter Turi | 6 ft 1 in (1.85 m) | Fr | Hunfalvy Janos Bilingual Secondary School | Budapest, Hungary |

Head coach

- Jim Jabir (Nazareth)

Assistant coach(es)

- Terry Primm (Palm Beach Atlantic)
- Heather Stec (Siena)
- Sydnie Rosales (Marist)

Legend

- (C) Team captain
- (S) Suspended
- (I) Ineligible
- (W) Walk-on
- Injured
- Current redshirt

Roster
Last update: February 13, 2024

== Schedule and results ==
| Date time, TV | Rank^{#} | Opponent^{#} | Result | Record | Site (attendance) city, state |
Regular season
| November 9, 2023*; 6:07 pm, ESPN+ | | at Binghamton | W 73–64 | 1–0 | Dr. Bai Lee Court (786); Vestal, NY |
| November 12, 2023*; 1:00 pm, ESPN+ | | at Dartmouth | W 56–49 | 2–0 | Leede Arena (453); Hanover, NH |
| November 19, 2023*; 2:00 pm, ESPN+ | | Penn | L 79–85 | 2–1 | UHY Center (709); Loudonville, NY |
| November 28, 2023*; 7:00 pm, ESPN+ | | Merrimack | L 64–67 ^{OT} | 2–2 | UHY Center (577); Loudonville, NY |
| December 2, 2023*; 5:00 pm, ESPN+ | | at Albany; Albany Cup | L 58–76 | 2–3 | Broadview Center (1,626); Albany, NY |
| December 7, 2023*; 7:00 pm, ESPN+ | | Fordham | W 65–62 | 3–3 | UHY Center (658); Loudonville, NY |
| December 10, 2023*; 12:00 pm, ACCNX | | at Boston College | L 59–88 | 3–4 | Conte Forum (733); Chestnut Hill, MA |
| December 16, 2023; 2:00 pm, ESPN+ | | Canisius | L 63–65 | 3–5 (0–1) | UHY Center (512); Loudonville, NY |
| December 18, 2023; 7:00 pm, ESPN+ | | at Mount St. Mary's | W 61–55 | 4–5 (1–1) | Knott Arena (227); Emmitsburg, MD |
| December 21, 2023*; 1:00 pm, ESPN+ | | at Cincinnati | L 51–71 | 4–6 | Fifth Third Arena (974); Cincinnati, OH |
| January 4, 2024; 11:00 am, ESPN+ | | at Manhattan | L 53–60 | 4–7 (1–2) | Draddy Gymnasium (208); Riverdale, NY |
| January 6, 2024; 2:00 pm, ESPN+ | | Saint Peter's | W 64–45 | 5–7 (2–2) | UHY Center (455); Loudonville, NY |
| January 11, 2024; 11:00 am, ESPN+ | | Niagara | W 66–64 | 6–7 (3–2) | UHY Center (1,058); Loudonville, NY |
| January 13, 2024; 2:00 pm, ESPN+ | | at Fairfield | L 73–78 | 6–8 (3–3) | Leo D. Mahoney Arena (609); Fairfield, CT |
| January 18, 2024; 7:00 pm, ESPN+ | | Rider | W 79–58 | 7–8 (4–3) | UHY Center (441); Loudonville, NY |
| January 20, 2024; 2:00 pm, ESPN+ | | Iona | W 77–56 | 8–8 (5–3) | UHY Center (713); Loudonville, NY |
| January 27, 2024; 4:00 pm, ESPN+ | | at Quinnipiac | W 78–60 | 9–8 (6–3) | M&T Bank Arena (888); Hamden, CT |
| February 1, 2024; 7:00 pm, ESPN+ | | Manhattan | W 74–51 | 10–8 (7–3) | UHY Center (679); Loudonville, NY |
| February 3, 2024; 7:00 pm, ESPN+ | | at Marist | W 71–67 | 11–8 (8–3) | McCann Arena (1,427); Poughkeepsie, NY |
| February 8, 2024; 7:00 pm, ESPN+ | | at Iona | W 74–57 | 12–8 (9–3) | Hynes Athletics Center (560); New Rochelle, NY |
| February 10, 2024; 2:00 pm, ESPN+ | | Quinnipiac | W 74–55 | 13–8 (10–3) | UHY Center (965); Loudonville, NY |
| February 15, 2024; 6:00 pm, ESPN+ | | at Niagara | L 70–84 | 13–9 (10–4) | Gallagher Center (336); Lewiston, NY |
| February 17, 2024; 1:00 pm, ESPN+ | | at Canisius | L 64–71 | 13–10 (10–5) | Koessler Athletic Center (593); Buffalo, NY |
| February 22, 2024; 7:00 pm, ESPN+ | | Fairfield | L 67–71 | 13–11 (10–6) | UHY Center (806); Loudonville, NY |
| February 24, 2024; 2:00 pm, ESPN+ | | at Saint Peter's | W 75–57 | 14–11 (11–6) | Run Baby Run Arena (272); Jersey City, NJ |
| February 29, 2024; 7:00 pm, ESPN+ | | Marist | W 73-62 | 15-11 (12-6) | UHY Center (662); Loudonville, NY |
| March 2, 2024; 5:00 pm, ESPN+ | | Mount St. Mary's | W 65-56 | 16-11 (13-6) | UHY Center (858); Loudonville, NY |
| March 7, 2024; 5:00 pm, ESPN+ | | at Rider | W 77-40 | 17-11 (14-6) | Alumni Gymnasium (589); Lawrenceville, NJ |
MAAC tournament
| March 14, 2024; 1:00 pm, ESPN+ | (3) | vs. (6) Mount St. Mary's; Quarterfinals | W 80-57 | 18-11 | Boardwalk Hall; Atlantic City, NJ |
| March 15, 2024; 1:41 pm, ESPN+ | (3) | vs. (2) Niagara; Semifinals | L 70-87 | 19-11 | Boardwalk Hall; Atlantic City, NJ |
*Non-conference game. ^{#}Rankings from AP Poll. (#) Tournament seedings in parentheses. All times are in Eastern.
