= Eastern Michigan Eagles basketball =

Eastern Michigan Eagles basketball may refer to either of the basketball teams that represent Eastern Michigan University:

- Eastern Michigan Eagles men's basketball
- Eastern Michigan Eagles women's basketball
