= 2024 MAAC women's basketball tournament =

American college basketball postseason tournament

- Classification: Division I
- Season: 2023–24
- Teams: 11
- Site: Jim Whelan Boardwalk Hall; Atlantic City, New Jersey
- Champions: Fairfield (5th title)
- Winning coach: Carly Thibault-DuDonis (1st title)
- Television: ESPN+, ESPNU

2023–24 MAAC women's basketball standings
	Conf.				Overall
Team	W		L	PCT	W		L	PCT
Fairfield †	20	–	0	1.000	31	–	2	.939
Niagara	15	–	5	.750	21	–	14	.600
Siena	14	–	6	.700	18	–	12	.600
Manhattan	11	–	9	.550	18	–	12	.600
Canisius	11	–	9	.550	17	–	14	.548
Mount St. Mary's	10	–	10	.500	14	–	17	.452
Quinnipiac	9	–	11	.450	13	–	18	.419
Rider	6	–	14	.300	10	–	21	.323
Iona	6	–	14	.300	11	–	19	.367
Saint Peter's	4	–	16	.200	7	–	23	.233
Marist	4	–	16	.200	6	–	25	.194
† 2024 MAAC tournament winner

The 2024 Metro Atlantic Athletic Conference women's basketball tournament will be the postseason women's basketball tournament for the Metro Atlantic Athletic Conference for the 2023–24 NCAA Division I women's basketball season. The tournament will be played March 12–16, 2024, at the Jim Whelan Boardwalk Hall in Atlantic City, New Jersey, for the fifth year in a row. The tournament winner will receive the conference's automatic bid to the 2024 NCAA Division I women's basketball tournament.

== Seeds ==
All 11 teams in the conference are scheduled participated in the Tournament. The top five teams will receive byes to the quarterfinals. Teams will be seeded by record within the conference, with a tiebreaker system to seed teams with identical conference records.

Seed	School	Conference	Tiebreaker
1	Fairfield	20–0	
2	Niagara	15–5	
3	Siena	14–6	
4	Manhattan	11–9	2–0 vs. Canisius
5	Canisius	11–9	0–2 vs. Canisius
6	Mount St. Mary's	10–10	
7	Quinnipiac	9–11	
8	Rider	6–14	2–0 vs. Iona
9	Iona	6–14	0–2 vs. Rider
10	Saint Peter's	4–16	2–0 vs. Marist
11	Marist	4–16	0–2 vs. Saint Peter's

== Schedule ==
Session	Game	Time*	Matchup	Score	Television
First round – Tuesday, March 12
1	1	10:30 am	No. 8 Rider vs No. 9 Iona	66–56	ESPN+
1	2	12:45 pm	No. 7 Quinnipiac vs No. 10 Saint Peter's	68–63	ESPN+
1	3	3:00 pm	No. 6 Mount St. Mary's vs No. 11 Marist	60–47	ESPN+
Quarterfinals – Wednesday, March 13
2	4	1:00 pm	No. 1 Fairfield vs No. 8 Rider	57–51	ESPN+
2	5	3:30 pm	No. 2 Niagara vs No. 7 Quinnipiac	70–56	ESPN+
Quarterfinals – Thursday, March 14
3	6	1:00 pm	No. 3 Siena vs No. 6 Mount St. Mary's	80–57	ESPN+
3	7	3:30 pm	No. 4 Manhattan vs No. 5 Canisius	55–58	ESPN+
Semifinals – Friday, March 15
4	8	11:00 am	No. 1 Fairfield vs No. 5 Canisius	77–64	ESPN+
4	9	1:30 pm	No. 2 Niagara vs No. 3 Siena	87–70	ESPN+
Championship – Saturday, March 16
5	10	3:30 pm	No. 1 Fairfield vs No. 2 Niagara	70–62^{OT}	ESPNU
*Game times in ET. Rankings denote tournament seeding.

== Bracket ==
First round Tuesday, March 12
8	Rider	66
9	Iona	56
7	Quinnipiac	68
10	Saint Peter's	63
6	Mount St. Mary's	60
11	Marist	47

Quarterfinals; Wednesday & Thursday, March 13/14
1	Fairfield	57
8	Rider	51
4	Manhattan	55
5	Canisius	58
2	Niagara	70
7	Quinnipiac	56
3	Siena	80
6	Mount St. Mary's	57

Semifinals; Friday, March 15
1	Fairfield	77
5	Canisius	64
2	Niagara	87
3	Siena	70

Championship; Saturday, March 16
1	Fairfield	70*
2	Niagara	62

== See also ==
- 2024 MAAC men's basketball tournament
