= 2023–24 Fairfield Stags women's basketball team =

American college basketball season

2023–24 Fairfield Stags women's basketball
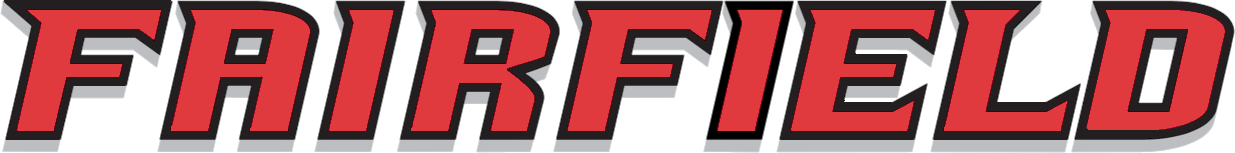

MAAC regular season and tournament champions

NCAA tournament, first round
- Conference: Metro Atlantic Athletic Conference

Ranking
- AP: No. 25
- Record: 31–2 (20–0 MAAC)
- Head coach: Carly Thibault-DuDonis (2nd season)
- Assistant coaches: Erik Johnson; Erika Brown; Blake DuDonis; Alex McKinnon
- Home arena: Leo D. Mahoney Arena

2023–24 MAAC women's basketball standings
	Conf.				Overall
Team	W		L	PCT	W		L	PCT
Fairfield †	20	–	0	1.000	31	–	2	.939
Niagara	15	–	5	.750	21	–	14	.600
Siena	14	–	6	.700	18	–	12	.600
Manhattan	11	–	9	.550	18	–	12	.600
Canisius	11	–	9	.550	17	–	14	.548
Mount St. Mary's	10	–	10	.500	14	–	17	.452
Quinnipiac	9	–	11	.450	13	–	18	.419
Rider	6	–	14	.300	10	–	21	.323
Iona	6	–	14	.300	11	–	19	.367
Saint Peter's	4	–	16	.200	7	–	23	.233
Marist	4	–	16	.200	6	–	25	.194
† 2024 MAAC tournament winner

The 2023–24 Fairfield Stags women's basketball team represented Fairfield University during the 2023–24 NCAA Division I women's basketball season. The Stags, led by second-year head coach Carly Thibault-DuDonis, played their home games at Leo D. Mahoney Arena in Fairfield, Connecticut as members of the Metro Atlantic Athletic Conference (MAAC).

== Previous season ==
The Stags finished the 2022–23 season 15–15, 11–9 in MAAC play, to finish in fifth place. In the MAAC tournament, they were defeated by Siena in the quarterfinals.

== Roster ==
2023–24 Fairfield Stags women's basketball team
Players
Coaches

Pos.	#	Name	Height	Year	Previous school	Hometown
G	1	Kendall McGruder	5 ft 9 in (1.75 m)	Jr	North Texas	Grand Prairie, Texas
G	2	Mimi Rubino	5 ft 7 in (1.7 m)	Sr	Morris Catholic High School	Pequannock, New Jersey
G	3	Janelle Brown	5 ft 6 in (1.68 m)	Sr	Longwood High School	Middle Island, New York
G	4	Kaety L'Amoreaux	5 ft 6 in (1.68 m)	Fr	Maine-Endwell High School	Endwell, New York
F	5	Meghan Andersen	6 ft 1 in (1.85 m)	Fr	Our Lady of Mercy Academy	Wantagh, New York
G	10	Izabela Nicoletti Leite	5 ft 10 in (1.78 m)	RS Sr	Florida State	Americana, Brazil
F	11	Karly Fischer	6 ft 2 in (1.88 m)	Fr	Albertus Magnus High School	Tappan, New York
G	12	Kate Peek	5 ft 9 in (1.75 m)	So	Millbrook School	Poughkeepsie, New York
F	15	Lauren Beach	6 ft 1 in (1.85 m)	Jr	Medway High School	Medway, Massachusetts
G	21	Nicole Gallagher	5 ft 8 in (1.73 m)	GS	Bryant	Foxborough, Massachusetts
G	22	Casey Prior	5 ft 7 in (1.7 m)	Fr	Red Bank Catholic High School	Sea Girt, New Jersey
G	23	Emina Selimovic	5 ft 10 in (1.78 m)	Jr	Siena	Erie, Pennsylvania
F	25	MacKenzie Daleba	5 ft 11 in (1.8 m)	Sr	Cathedral High School	Dorchester, Massachusetts
G	33	Brooke Tatarian	5 ft 10 in (1.78 m)	Jr	Masters School	Yonkers, New York
F	34	Dayna Tirado	6 ft 1 in (1.85 m)	Sr	Northern Valley Demarest High School	Closter, New Jersey

Head coach

- Carly Thibault-DuDonis (Monmouth)

Assistant coach(es)

- Erik Johnson (UC San Diego)
- Erika Brown (Delaware)
- Blake DuDonis (Gardner–Webb)
- Alex McKinnon (Montclair State)

Legend

- (C) Team captain
- (S) Suspended
- (I) Ineligible
- (W) Walk-on
- Injured
- Current redshirt

Roster
Last update: February 19, 2024

== Schedule and results ==
Date time, TV	Rank^{#}	Opponent^{#}	Result	Record	Site (attendance) city, state
Regular season
November 6, 2023*; 7:00 p.m., ESPN+		Lehman	W 101–14	1–0	Leo D. Mahoney Arena (976); Fairfield, CT
November 10, 2023*; 12:00 p.m., ESPN+		at Lipscomb	W 89–66	2–0	Allen Arena (267); Nashville, TN
November 12, 2023*; 2:00 p.m., SECN+		at Vanderbilt	L 70–73	2–1	Memorial Gymnasium (1,886); Nashville, TN
November 20, 2023*; 7:00 p.m., B1G+		at Rutgers	W 78–54	3–1	Jersey Mike's Arena (1,309); Piscataway, NJ
November 26, 2023*; 1:00 p.m., NEC Front Row		at Central Connecticut	W 78–52	4–1	William H. Detrick Gymnasium (221); New Britain, CT
November 29, 2023*; 7:00 p.m., SNY		at Sacred Heart	W 66–61 ^{OT}	5–1	William H. Pitt Center (788); Fairfield, CT
December 7, 2023*; 7:00 p.m., ESPN+		St. John's	W 67–62	6–1	Leo D. Mahoney Arena (850); Fairfield, CT
December 10, 2023*; 2:00 p.m., ESPN+		Fordham	W 77–74	7–1	Leo D. Mahoney Arena (645); Fairfield, CT
December 16, 2023; 2:00 p.m., ESPN+		Mount St. Mary's	W 62–44	8–1 (1–0)	Leo D. Mahoney Arena (612); Fairfield, CT
December 18, 2023; 7:00 p.m., ESPN+		Manhattan	W 82–58	9–1 (2–0)	Leo D. Mahoney Arena (463); Fairfield, CT
December 30, 2023*; 2:00 p.m., NEC Front Row		at Stonehill	W 72–49	10–1	Merkert Gymnasium (431); Easton, MA
January 4, 2024; 11:00 a.m., ESPN+		at Niagara	W 77–54	11–1 (3–0)	Gallagher Center (1,754); Lewiston, NY
January 6, 2024; 1:00 p.m., ESPN+		at Canisius	W 64–51	12–1 (4–0)	Koessler Athletic Center (404); Buffalo, NY
January 11, 2024; 7:00 p.m., ESPN+		Iona	W 72–44	13–1 (5–0)	Leo D. Mahoney Arena (498); Fairfield, CT
January 13, 2024; 2:00 p.m., ESPN+		Siena	W 78–73	14–1 (6–0)	Leo D. Mahoney Arena (609); Fairfield, CT
January 20, 2024; 4:00 p.m., ESPN+		at Marist	W 60–46	15–1 (7–0)	McCann Arena (1,525); Poughkeepsie, NY
January 25, 2024; 5:00 p.m., ESPN+		at Quinnipiac	W 74–59	16–1 (8–0)	M&T Bank Arena (551); Hamden, CT
January 27, 2024; 2:00 p.m., ESPN+		Canisius	W 70–42	17–1 (9–0)	Leo D. Mahoney Arena (1,315); Fairfield, CT
February 1, 2024; 7:00 p.m., ESPN+		at Rider	W 67–44	18–1 (10–0)	Alumni Gymnasium (678); Lawrenceville, NJ
February 3, 2024; 3:00 p.m., ESPN+		at Iona	W 85–49	19–1 (11–0)	Hynes Athletics Center (212); New Rochelle, NY
February 8, 2024; 11:00 a.m., ESPN+		Marist	W 76–49	20–1 (12–0)	Leo D. Mahoney Arena (1,891); Fairfield, CT
February 10, 2024; 2:00 p.m., ESPN+		Saint Peter's	W 52–46	21–1 (13–0)	Leo D. Mahoney Arena (925); Fairfield, CT
February 17, 2024; 2:00 p.m., ESPN+		at Mount St. Mary's	W 61–59	22–1 (14–0)	Knott Arena (391); Emmitsburg, MD
February 22, 2024; 7:00 p.m., ESPN+		at Siena	W 71–67	23–1 (15–0)	UHY Center (806); Loudonville, NY
February 24, 2024; 2:00 p.m., ESPN+		Niagara	W 95–65	24–1 (16–0)	Leo D. Mahoney Arena (1,624); Fairfield, CT
February 29, 2024; 7:00 p.m., ESPN+		Quinnipiac	W 64–46	25–1 (17–0)	Leo D. Mahoney Arena (1,117); Fairfield, CT
March 2, 2024; 2:00 p.m., ESPN+		at Manhattan	W 77–53	26–1 (18–0)	Draddy Gymnasium (217); Riverdale, NY
March 7, 2024; 7:00 p.m., ESPN+	No. 25	at Saint Peter's	W 63–46	27–1 (19–0)	Run Baby Run Arena (319); Jersey City, NJ
March 9, 2024; 2:00 p.m., ESPN+	No. 25	Rider	W 83–54	28–1 (20–0)	Leo D. Mahoney Arena (1,525); Fairfield, CT
MAAC tournament
March 13, 2024; 1:00 p.m., ESPN+	(1) No. 25	vs. (8) Rider; Quarterfinals	W 57–51	29–1	Boardwalk Hall; Atlantic City, NJ
March 15, 2024; 11:00 a.m., ESPN+	(1) No. 25	vs. (5) Canisius; Semifinals	W 77–64	30–1	Boardwalk Hall; Atlantic City, NJ
March 16, 2024; 3:30 p.m., ESPNU	(1) No. 25	vs. (2) Niagara; Championship	W 70–62 ^{OT}	31–1	Boardwalk Hall (1,007); Atlantic City, NJ
NCAA women's tournament
March 23, 2024; 1:30 p.m., ESPN2	(13 A1) No. 25	at (4 A1) No. 14 Indiana; First round	L 56–89	31–2	Simon Skjodt Assembly Hall (12,753); Bloomington, IN
*Non-conference game. ^{#}Rankings from AP poll. (#) Tournament seedings in parentheses. A1=Albany 1. All times are in Eastern.

== Rankings ==
Ranking movements Legend: ██ Increase in ranking ██ Decrease in ranking — = Not ranked RV = Received votes
	Week																				
Poll	Pre	1	2	3	4	5	6	7	8	9	10	11	12	13	14	15	16	17	18	19	Final
AP	—	—	—	—	—	—	—	—	—	—	RV	RV	RV	RV	RV	RV	RV	RV	25	25	Not released
Coaches	—	—	—	—	—	—	—	—	—	—	—	—	RV	RV	RV	RV	RV	RV	RV	RV	
