= David Six (basketball) =

American basketball coach

Biographical details
- Education: Hunter College

Coaching career (HC unless noted)
- 2009–2024: Hampton

Head coaching record
- Overall: 264–188 (.584)

Accomplishments and honors

Awards
- Pat Summitt Most Courageous Award (2019)

David Six (born 1963 or 1964) is the former head coach of the Hampton Lady Pirates basketball team. Before joining the Lady Pirates in 2009, Six started his head coaching tenure at Hampton High School as their girls basketball coach from 1993 to 1995. At Hampton, Six reached the semi-finals of the 1995 Virginia High School League tournament for Group AAA teams. Six then coached boys basketball at Gloucester High School from 1995 to 1997. After returning to the girls basketball team at Hampton in 1998, Six remained at Hampton High until 2008. As their coach, Six and Hampton High won the Group AAA championship in girls basketball during 2001 and 2007.

With the Hampton Pirates, Six won the MEAC women's basketball tournament six times between 2010 and 2017. Leading up to 2023, the team were quarter-finalists at the Big South Conference women's basketball tournament twice and the Coastal Athletic Association women's basketball tournament. Six has reached the first round of the NCAA Division I women's basketball tournament six times and the second round of the 2015 Women's National Invitation Tournament. In 2018, Six beat the record for most women's basketball wins for Hampton University. He was awarded the Kay Yow Award in 2014 and the USBWA Most Courageous Award in 2019. With 264 wins and 188 losses, Six left Hampton in 2024.

== Early life and career ==
Six was born in the early 1960s. He grew up in Brooklyn, New York and attended Hunter College. After his father's death, Six grew up with his sibling and mother. As a member of the Langley Air Force Base, Six played basketball from 1985 to 1991. With Hampton High School, Six worked on their boys basketball team as an assistant coach from 1991 to 1993 in a volunteer position. Before joining Hampton High, Six worked in the Amateur Athletic Union for the Boo Williams League in boys basketball during the 1980s and 1990s.

== Head coaching career ==
=== 1993 to 2008 ===
While at Hampton High, Six turned down a coaching position for their girls basketball team. After he was offered the role again, Six accepted the role as an interim girls basketball coach for Hampton. Between 1993 and 1995, Six reached the semi-finals of the 1995 tournament held by the Virginia High School League for Group AAA. With the girls team, Six won 49 games and lost 28 games.

While coaching at Hampton, he was also one of the coaches that won the 1993 Virginia AAU championship for the 16U division with Boo Williams in boys basketball. From 1995 to 1997, Six coached a boys basketball team at Gloucester High School. He had 24 wins and 39 losses while at Gloucester. During his time with Gloucester, Six also worked for Hampton in an administration position.

In 1998, Hampton resumed his coaching experience at Hampton with the girls basketball team. With Hampton, Six and his girls basketball team won several championships while part of the Virginia High School League. During the 2000s, Six won the Group AAA championship in 2001 and 2007 with the Hampton girls. His team also appeared in the semifinals of the Group AAA girls tournament for Virginia in 2003.

During this time period, Six also worked as a coach in 15U girls basketball for the Boo Williams Summer League while at Hampton High. In 2000, Six and his 15U team were first at the Virginia Commonwealth Games in the girls basketball event with Boo Williams. That year, Six co-coached the team that qualified for the 15U girls basketball championship held by the Amateur Athletic Union. Six remained with Hampton High until he ended his coaching position in 2008. With the girls team, Six had accumulated 331 wins and 93 losses while with Hampton for over ten years. In 2008, Six started working in intramural sports for Hampton University as their director.

=== 2009 to 2024 ===
In April 2009, Six became the head coach of the Hampton Pirates women's basketball team as an interim position. The following year, Six became the permanent head coach and renewed his coaching position with Hampton for three years. With Hampton, Six won the MEAC women's basketball tournament six times from 2010 to 2017. During this time period, Six and Hampton reached the first round of the NCAA Division I women's basketball tournament six times. At the 2015 Women's National Invitation Tournament, Six and Hampton made it to the second round.

After winning his 184th game in 2018, Six beat the record by James Sweat for most women's basketball wins at Hampton. That year, Hampton moved to the Big South Conference. The team were quarter-finalists at the Big South Conference women's basketball tournament during 2019 and 2022. In 2022, the university moved to the Colonial Athletic Association. The following year, his team played in the 2023 Coastal Athletic Association women's basketball tournament and were quarter-finalists. With 264 wins and 188 losses, Six ended his position at Hampton during 2024.

== Awards and personal life ==
Six was Group AAA girls basketball Coach of the Year for the Virginia High School Coaches Association during 2001 and 2007. He was also named Coach of the Year by the Associated Press in 2007 while in Group AAA. As a Mid-Eastern Athletic Conference coach, Six was the conference Coach of the Year in 2011, 2013 and 2014. In 2014, Six received the Kay Yow Award.

Apart from basketball, Six served during the Gulf War. In 1998, Six was injured from a car accident. Six had a stroke in June 2018, which led to a frozen shoulder. He underwent physical therapy the following month. In 2019, Six was one of the winners of the USBWA Most Courageous Award. He was selected as one of the Legends of Coaching for the 50th year of the Mid-Eastern Athletic Conference in 2021.
