= Carly Thibault-DuDonis =

American basketball coach (born 1991)

Current position
- Title: Head coach
- Team: Fairfield
- Conference: MAAC
- Record: 102–27 (.791)

Biographical details
- Born: July 31, 1991 (age 35); Omaha, Nebraska, U.S.

Playing career
- 2009–2013: Monmouth

Coaching career (HC unless noted)
- 2014–2016: Eastern Michigan (assistant)
- 2016–2018: Mississippi State (assistant)
- 2018–2022: Minnesota (assistant)
- 2022–present: Fairfield

Administrative career (AD unless noted)
- 2013–2014: Florida State (DRO)

Head coaching record
- Overall: 102–27 (.791)
- Tournaments: 0–3 (NCAA)

Accomplishments and honors

Championships
- 3 MAAC regular season (2023–24, 2024–25, 2025–26); 3 MAAC tournament championship (2024–2026)

Awards
- As player: NEC Scholar-Athlete of the Year (2012); All-NEC Third-team (2012); As coach: Kay Yow Award (2024); MAAC Coach of the Year (2024)

Carly Thibault-DuDonis (born July 31, 1991) is the women's basketball coach for Fairfield University since 2022. As a basketball player at Monmouth University, Thibault was named All-Northeast Conference in 2013 and scored 730 points overall. Her 106 career three points were in the top five for the school during 2024. Thibault began her career with Florida State University as their Director of Recruiting Operations during 2013. Throughout the remainder of the 2010s, she held assistant coaching positions with Eastern Michigan University, Mississippi State University and the University of Minnesota.

At Minnesota, Thibault-DuDonis was primarily the associate head coach during the 2020s. In January 2022, she was their temporary coach. With Fairfield, her team were first at the 2024 MAAC women's basketball tournament and in the first round of the NCAA Division I women's basketball tournament. That year, Thibault-DuDonis was given a Coach of the Year award by the Metro Atlantic Athletic Conference. She also was the Kay Yow Award recipient.

== Early life and education ==
At Omaha, Nebraska, Carly Thibault's birth occurred on July 31, 1991. As a toddler, she started playing basketball. Before she attended middle school, gymnastics was her main interest. She began living in Connecticut during 2003. She was on the Connecticut Storm girls basketball team until 2008.

Thibault began her time with East Lyme High School in 2005. That year, she played "in the first round of the CIAC Class L girls' soccer tournament". During 2008, Thibault had injuries to her knee, nose and eye while on their basketball team. Her team reached the championship game of the 2008 Class L Girls Basketball Tournament. During the late 2000s, Thibault was with the Rhode Island Breakers as part of the Amateur Athletic Union.

In 2009, Thibault began playing basketball at Monmouth University. She was named All-Northeast Conference during 2013. After leaving the team in 2013, she had 254 rebounds and 730 points. Her 166 career three-pointers was in the top five for Monmouth during 2024. Thibault studied sport psychology while at the university.

== Career ==
Thibault began her women's basketball career in 2013 when she went to Florida State University to work as their Director of Recruiting Operations. With Eastern Michigan University, she became an assistant coach in 2014. She continued her assistant coaching experience after moving to Mississippi State University in 2016. During 2018, Carly Thibault-DuDonis remained as an assistant coach upon joining the University of Minnesota. She was selected as an assistant coach for the 2019 Aurora Games.

While at Minnesota, she became their associate head coach during 2020. Thibault-DuDonis temporarily coached the team in January 2022. During April 2022, she became the head coach at Fairfield University. Her team won 29 straight games, went 20–0 in the MAAC regular season, and won the 2024 MAAC women's basketball tournament. In that year's NCAA Division I women's basketball tournament, they reached the first round. In addition, her team was ranked #25 in the AP Poll for the last few weeks of the season, marking the first time in Fairfield history the team was ranked in the Top 25.

In the 2024–2025 season, Thibault-DuDonis' Stags won on the road at Arkansas and Wake Forest, while also defeated Big East member Villanova. In the Villanova game, the MAAC preseason player of the year, Janelle Brown, tore her ACL. Despite Brown's absence, the team went 19–1 in the MAAC regular season to win their 2nd straight regular season title. The team then went on to win the MAAC tournament for the 2nd year in a row as well, making them the 1st team to win back-to-back MAAC tournaments since 2019. It was also the first time in program history that the program won back-to-back titles. The team earned a 12-seed in the NCAA tournament, the highest seed in program history at the time.

In the 2025–2026 season, the Stags cemented their status as one of the premier mid-major programs in the country, reaching #25 in the AP poll for the second time in three seasons. They defeated Villanova and Richmond on the road, while falling to national powers Iowa and UNC by 14 points. They led the nation in three-pointers made per game (over 11), while being top 10 in three-point percentage. They hit 13 or more threes in 11 games, including a program record 20 in a game against St. Peter's. They won the MAAC regular season title (co-champions with Quinnipiac) and the MAAC tournament for the third straight season. It is just the third three-peat in league history and first at Fairfield. Their 11-seed is the highest seed in program history.

== Head coaching record ==
Record table
Season	Team	Overall	Conference	Standing	Postseason
Fairfield Stags (MAAC) (2022–present)
2022–23	Fairfield	15–15	11–9	5th	
2023–24	Fairfield	31–2	20–0	1st	NCAA First Round
2024–25	Fairfield	28–5	19–1	1st	NCAA First Round
2025–26	Fairfield	28–5	19–1	T–1st	NCAA First Round
Fairfield:		102–27 (.791)	69–11 (.863)		
Total:		102–27 (.791)			
National champion Postseason invitational champion Conference regular season champion Conference regular season and conference tournament champion Division regular season champion Division regular season and conference tournament champion Conference tournament champion

== Honors and personal life ==
Thibault was selected as part of the Thirty Under 30 list by Women's Basketball Coaches Association during 2018. In 2024, the Metro Atlantic Athletic Conference and Metropolitan Basketball Writers Association gave her Coach of the Year awards. That year, she was the Kay Yow Award recipient. Thibault was married in 2017. She is the daughter of Mike Thibault and sister to Eric Thibault, both of whom have coached in the WNBA.
