= UHY Center =

- Interactive map of UHY Center
- Former names: Alumni Recreation Center (1974–2021); UHY Center (2021–present)
- Location: 515 Loudon Road, Loudonville, New York 12211
- Coordinates: 42.7174°N 73.7487°W
- Capacity: 4,000

Tenants
- Siena Saints (women's basketball and volleyball)

The UHY Center is a 4,000-seat multi-purpose arena in Loudonville, New York. It was built in 1974 and is home to the Siena College Saints women's basketball team and women's volleyball team. It used to host the men's team until MVP Arena opened in 1990.

== See also ==
- List of NCAA Division I basketball arenas
