= 2021–22 Albany Great Danes women's basketball team =

Intercollegiate basketball season

2021–22 Albany Great Danes women's basketball

America East tournament champions

NCAA tournament, first round
- Conference: America East Conference
- Record: 23–10 (13–5 America East)
- Head coach: Colleen Mullen (4th season)
- Assistant coaches: Megan Methven; Catherine Cassidy; Yvonne Hawkins
- Home arena: SEFCU Arena

2021–22 America East Conference women's basketball standings
	Conf.				Overall
Team	W		L	PCT	W		L	PCT
Maine	15	–	3	.833	20	–	12	.625
Stony Brook*	14	–	4	.778	23	–	6	.793
Albany †	13	–	5	.722	23	–	10	.697
Vermont	13	–	5	.722	20	–	11	.645
NJIT	9	–	8	.529	15	–	15	.500
UMass Lowell	8	–	9	.471	11	–	16	.407
Binghamton	5	–	13	.278	9	–	20	.310
New Hampshire	4	–	12	.250	7	–	21	.250
Hartford	4	–	14	.222	4	–	26	.133
UMBC	2	–	14	.125	3	–	23	.115
† 2022 America East tournament winner *Ineligible for the AmEast Tournament due to a postseason ban imposed by the AmEast.

The 2021–22 Albany Great Danes women's basketball team represented the University at Albany, SUNY during the 2021–22 NCAA Division I women's basketball season. The Great Danes, led by fourth-year head coach Colleen Mullen, played their home games at SEFCU Arena and were members of the America East Conference.

They finished the season 23–10, 13–5 in America East play, to finish in a tie for third place. As the second seed in the America East tournament, they defeated New Hampshire in the quarterfinals, Vermont in the semifinals, and Maine in the finals to finish as tournament champions. They received an automatic bid to the NCAA tournament, where they were the sixteenth seed in the Wichita Region. They were defeated in the first round by Louisville to end their season.

== Previous season ==
The Great Danes finished the 2020–21 season 7–11, 5–7 in America East play, to finish in fourth place. As the fourth seed in the America East tournament, they defeated New Hampshire in the quarterfinals before losing to Maine in the semifinals. They were not invited to the NCAA tournament or the WNIT.

== Roster ==
2021–22 Albany Great Danes women's basketball team
Players
Coaches

Pos.	#	Name	Height	Year	Previous school	Hometown
G	1	Fatima Lee	5 ft 7 in (1.7 m)	Jr	Putnam Science; Providence	Queens, NY
G	3	Lilly Phillips	5 ft 11 in (1.8 m)	Fr	Cambridge Central	Greenwich, NY
G	10	Ellen Hahne	5 ft 10 in (1.78 m)	Sr	Riksbasketgymansiet Luleå; Wake Forest	Stockholm, Sweden
G	12	Freja Werth	6 ft 1 in (1.85 m)	Fr	Riksbasketgymansiet Luleå	Arild, Sweden
F	13	Lucia DeCortes	6 ft 3 in (1.91 m)	Sr	Liceo delle Scienze Umane e Musicale	Bergamo, Italy
G	14	Grace Heeps	5 ft 11 in (1.8 m)	Jr	Northfield Mount Hermon; UMass	East Greenbush, NY
G	15	Morgan Haney	5 ft 8 in (1.73 m)	RS So	Miami East	Piqua, OH
G	20	Kayla Cooper	6 ft 0 in (1.83 m)	So	St. John's Catholic	Frederick, MD
F	21	Helene Haegerstrand	6 ft 1 in (1.85 m)	Jr	Morbyskolan	Stockholm, Sweden
F	22	Taniya Hanner	6 ft 1 in (1.85 m)	Jr	Roselle Catholic	Hillside, NJ
F	23	Koi Sims	6 ft 0 in (1.83 m)	Fr	Archbishop Spalding	Glen Burnie, MD
G	24	Abby Ray	5 ft 8 in (1.73 m)	Fr	Saratoga Springs	Saratoga Springs, NY
F	32	Abby Robinson	6 ft 1 in (1.85 m)	RS So	Putnam Science	Mount Vernon, NY

Head coach

- Colleen Mullen (New Hampshire)

Assistant coach(es)

- Megan Methven (Stonehill)
- Catherine Cassidy (Plattsburgh State)
- Yvonne Hawkins (Ashland)

Legend

- (C) Team captain
- (S) Suspended
- (I) Ineligible
- (W) Walk-on
- Injured
- Current redshirt

Roster
Last update: May 24, 2022

== Schedule ==
Date time, TV	Rank^{#}	Opponent^{#}	Result	Record	Site (attendance) city, state
Non-conference regular season
November 10, 2021*; 7:00 p.m., ESPN+		Hofstra	W 70–41	1–0	SEFCU Arena (1,097); Albany, NY
November 16, 2021*; 7:00 p.m.		at Merrimack	L 52–65	1–1	Hammel Court (511); North Andover, MA
November 24, 2021*; 1:00 p.m., ESPN+		at Cornell	L 46–47	1–2	Newman Arena (87); Ithaca, NY
November 28, 2021*; Noon, ACCNX		at Boston College	L 65–77	1–3	Conte Forum (599); Chestnut Hill, MA
December 1, 2021*; 7:00 p.m., ESPN+		Bryant	W 60–34	2–3	SEFCU Arena (1,022); Albany, NY
December 5, 2021*; 2:00 p.m.		at Colgate	W 60–39	3–3	Cotterell Court (291); Hamilton, NY
December 8, 2021*; 11:00 a.m., SECN+		at Vanderbilt	L 41–52	3–4	Memorial Gymnasium (3,688); Nashville, TN
December 12, 2021*; 2:00 p.m., ESPN+		Siena; Albany Cup	W 64–44	4–4	SEFCU Arena (1,366); Albany, NY
December 15, 2021*; 7:00 p.m., ESPN+		Canisius	W 65–46	5–4	SEFCU Arena (835); Albany, NY
December 18, 2021*; 2:00 p.m., ESPN3		SUNY Canton	Cancelled		SEFCU Arena; Albany, NY
December 21, 2021*; 7:00 p.m., ESPN+		CCSU	W 65–52	6–4	SEFCU Arena (760); Albany, NY
December 28, 2021*; 7:00 p.m., ESPN+		Union	W 88–37	7–4	SEFCU Arena (759); Albany, NY
America East regular season
January 8, 2022; 2:00 p.m., ESPN3		New Hampshire	W 50–39	8–4 (1–0)	SEFCU Arena (865); Albany, NY
January 12, 2022; 7:00 p.m., ESPN+		at UMass Lowell	W 58–52	9–4 (2–0)	Costello Athletic Center (124); Lowell, MA
January 15, 2022; 2:00 p.m., ESPN3		at NJIT	W 62–54	10–4 (3–0)	Wellness and Events Center (257); Newark, NJ
January 17, 2022; 1:00 p.m., ESPN+		at Hartford; Rescheduled from December 30	L 49–52	10–5 (3–1)	Chase Arena at Reich Family Pavilion (101); West Hartford, CT
January 19, 2022; 11:00 a.m., ESPN+		UMBC	W 69–40	11–5 (4–1)	SEFCU Arena (812); Albany, NY
January 22, 2022; 2:00 p.m., ESPN3		at Stony Brook	L 47–58	11–6 (4–2)	Island Federal Credit Union Arena (668); Stony Brook, NY
January 26, 2022; 7:00 p.m., ESPN+		UMass Lowell	W 56–44	12–6 (5–2)	SEFCU Arena (954); Albany, NY
January 29, 2022; 2:00 p.m., ESPN3		NJIT	W 57–53	13–6 (6–2)	SEFCU Arena (938); Albany, NY
January 31, 2022; 6:00 p.m., ESPN+		at Binghamton; Rescheduled from January 5	W 52–41	14–6 (7–2)	Events Center (944); Vestal, NY
February 2, 2022; 7:00 p.m., ESPN+		at UMBC	W 51–41	15–6 (8–2)	Chesapeake Employers Insurance Arena (1,106); Baltimore, MD
February 5, 2022; 2:00 p.m., ESPN3		Hartford	W 53–24	16–6 (9–2)	SEFCU Arena (828); Albany, NY
February 9, 2022; 7:00 p.m., ESPN+		at Maine	L 55–64	16–7 (9–3)	Cross Insurance Center (945); Bangor, ME
February 12, 2022; 1:00 p.m., ESPN3		Vermont; Rescheduled from January 2	W 54–52	17–7 (10–3)	SEFCU Arena (824); Albany, NY
February 14, 2022; Noon, ESPN3		at Vermont; Rescheduled from February 12	L 55–63	17–8 (10–4)	Patrick Gym (327); Burlington, VT
February 16, 2022; 7:00 p.m., ESPN+		Binghamton	W 61–48	18–8 (11–4)	SEFCU Arena (876); Albany, NY
February 19, 2022; 1:00 p.m., ESPN3		at New Hampshire	W 55–46	19–8 (12–4)	Lundholm Gym (448); Durham, NH
February 23, 2022; 7:00 p.m., ESPN+		Maine	L 45–49	19–9 (12–5)	SEFCU Arena (932); Albany, NY
February 26, 2022; 4:00 p.m., ESPN3		Stony Brook	W 57–56	20–9 (13–5)	SEFCU Arena (1,058); Albany, NY
America East tournament
March 5, 2022; 2:00 p.m., ESPN+	(2)	(7) New Hampshire; Quarterfinals	W 49–44	21–9	SEFCU Arena (727); Albany, NY
March 8, 2022; 7:00 p.m., ESPN+	(2)	(3) Vermont; Semifinals	W 67–54	22–9	SEFCU Arena (732); Albany, NY
March 11, 2022; 5:00 p.m., ESPN2	(2)	at (1) Maine; Final	W 56–47	23–9	Memorial Gymnasium (1,329); Orono, ME
NCAA tournament
March 18, 2022; 6:00 p.m., ESPN2	(16 W)	at (1 W) No. 4 Louisville; First round	L 51–83	23–10	KFC Yum! Center (8,407); Louisville, KY
*Non-conference game. ^{#}Rankings from AP poll. (#) Tournament seedings in parentheses. W=Wichita. All times are in Eastern.

== Rankings ==
Ranking movements Legend: — = Not ranked
	Week																		
Poll	Pre	1	2	3	4	5	6	7	8	9	10	11	12	13	14	15	16	17	Final
AP	—	—	—	—	—	—	—	—	—	—	—	—	—	—	—	—	—	—	—
Coaches	—	—	—	—	—	—	—	—	—	—	—	—	—	—	—	—	—	—	—

Legend
	Increase in ranking
	Decrease in ranking
	Not ranked previous week
(RV)	Received votes
(NR)	Not ranked and did not receive votes

The Coaches Poll did not release a Week 2 poll and the AP poll did not release a poll after the NCAA tournament.
