= America East Conference women's basketball tournament =

America East women's basketball tournament
- Conference basketball championship
- Sport: College basketball
- Conference: America East Conference
- Number of teams: 9
- Format: Single-elimination
- Current stadium: Campus sites
- Current location: Campus sites
- Played: 1985–present
- Last contest: 2024
- Current champion: Vermont (2025)
- Most championships: Maine Black Bears (10)
- Official website: americaeast.com/wbball

Sponsors
- Jersey Mikes

The America East Conference women's basketball tournament is the annual concluding tournament for the NCAA college basketball in the America East Conference. The winner of the annual tournament gains an automatic bid to the NCAA Women's Division I Basketball Championship.

== History of the tournament finals ==
Year	Champion	Score	Runner-up	Most Outstanding Player	Tournament venue
1985	Northeastern	73–59	Maine	N/A	Unknown
1986	Northeastern	62–55	Boston University	N/A	Unknown
1987	Northeastern	55–48	Maine	N/A	Unknown
1988	Boston University	66–62	Maine	N/A	Unknown
1989	Boston University	60–54	Northeastern	N/A	Unknown
1990	Maine	64–54	Boston University	Rachel Bouchard, Maine	Unknown
1991	Maine	79–64	Vermont	Rachel Bouchard, Maine	Unknown
1992	Vermont	70–50	Maine	Sharon Bay, Vermont	Unknown
1993	Vermont	62–45	Maine	Sharon Bay, Vermont	Unknown
1994	Vermont	53–51	Northeastern	Sheri Turnbull, Vermont	Unknown
1995	Maine	70–59	Northeastern	Cindy Blodgett, Maine	Unknown
1996	Maine	88–55	Vermont	Cindy Blodgett, Maine	Unknown
1997	Maine	92–70	Vermont	Cindy Blodgett, Maine	Unknown
1998	Maine	81–80	Vermont	Cindy Blodgett, Maine	Alfond Arena, (Orono, ME)
1999	Northeastern	57–55	Maine	Tesha Tinsley, Northeastern	Patrick Gym, (Burlington, VT)
2000	Vermont	77–50	Maine	Karalyn Church, Vermont	Patrick Gym, (Burlington, VT)
2001	Delaware	69–64	Vermont	Cindy Johnson, Delaware	Patrick Gym, (Burlington, VT)
2002	Hartford	60–57	Stony Brook	Kenitra Johnson, Hartford	Chase Arena at Reich Family Pavilion, (West Hartford, CT)
2003	Boston University	69–65	Maine	Katie Terhune, Boston University	Chase Arena at Reich Family Pavilion, (West Hartford, CT)
2004	Maine	68–43	Boston University	Heather Ernest, Maine	Chase Arena at Reich Family Pavilion, (West Hartford, CT)
2005	Hartford	52–50	Boston University	Erika Messam, Hartford	Chase Arena at Reich Family Pavilion, (West Hartford, CT)
2006	Hartford	75–56	Boston University	Erika Messam, Hartford	Chase Arena at Reich Family Pavilion, (West Hartford, CT)
2007	UMBC	48–46	Hartford	Amanda Robinson, UMBC	Binghamton University Events Center, (Vestal, NY)
2008	Hartford	61–45	Boston University	Lisa Etienne, Hartford	Chase Arena at Reich Family Pavilion, (West Hartford, CT)
2009	Vermont	74–66	Boston University	Courtnay Pilypaitis, Vermont	Chase Arena at Reich Family Pavilion, (West Hartford, CT)
2010	Vermont	55–50	Hartford	Courtnay Pilypaitis, Vermont	Preliminary Rounds at Chase Arena at Reich Family Pavilion, (West Hartford, CT); Finals at Chase Areana at Reich Family Pavilion, (West Hartford, CT)
2011	Hartford	65–53	Boston University	Alex Hall, Hartford	Preliminary Rounds at Chase Arena at Reich Family Pavilion, (West Hartford, CT); Finals at Case Gym, (Boston, MA)
2012	Albany	69–61	UMBC	Ebone Henry, Albany	Preliminary Rounds at Chase Arena (West Hartford, CT); Finals at SEFCU Arena, (Albany, NY)
2013	Albany	61–52	Hartford	Megan Craig, Albany	Preliminary Rounds at SEFCU Arena, (Albany, NY); Finals at SEFCU Arena, (Albany, NY)
2014	Albany	70–46	Stony Brook	Shereesha Richards, Albany	Preliminary Rounds at SEFCU Arena, (Albany, NY); Finals at SEFCU Arena, (Albany, NY)
2015	Albany	84–75	Hartford	Shereesha Richards, Albany	Preliminary Rounds at Binghamton University Events Center, (Vestal, NY); Finals at SEFCU Arena, (Albany, NY)
2016	Albany	59–58	Maine	Shereesha Richards, Albany	Preliminary Rounds at Binghamton University Events Center, (Vestal, NY); Finals at SEFCU Arena, (Albany, NY)
2017	Albany	66–50	Maine	Imani Tate, Albany	Preliminary Rounds at Cross Insurance Center, (Portland, ME); Finals at SEFCU Arena, (Albany, NY)
2018	Maine	74–65	Hartford	Blanca Millan, Maine	Preliminary Rounds at Cross Insurance Center, Portland, ME; Finals at Top seed.
2019	Maine	68–48	Hartford	Blanca Millan, Maine	Campus Sites
2020	Cancelled due to the COVID-19 pandemic				
2021	Stony Brook	64–60	Maine	Annie Warren, Stony Brook	Campus Sites
2022	Albany	56–47	Maine	Kayla Cooper, Albany	Campus Sites; Finals at Memorial Gymnasium (Orono, ME)
2023	Vermont	38–36	Albany	Emma Utterback, Vermont	Campus Sites; Finals at Patrick Gymnasium (Burlington, VT)
2024	Maine	64–48	Vermont	Anne Simon, Maine	Campus Sites; Finals at Memorial Gymnasium (Orono, ME)
2025	Vermont	62–55	Albany	Nikola Priede, Vermont	Campus Sites; Finals at Patrick Gymnasium (Burlington, VT)
2026	Vermont	61-43	Maine	Nikola Priede, Vermont	Campus Sites; Finals at Patrick Gymnasium (Burlington, VT)

== Tournament championships by school ==
School	Tournament Championships	Championship Years
Maine	10	1990, 1991, 1995, 1996, 1997, 1998, 2004, 2018, 2019, 2024
Vermont	9	1992, 1993, 1994, 2000, 2009, 2010, 2023, 2025, 2026
Albany	7	2012, 2013, 2014, 2015, 2016, 2017, 2022
Hartford	5	2002, 2005, 2006, 2008, 2011
Northeastern	4	1985, 1986, 1987, 1999
Boston	3	1988, 1989, 2003
Stony Brook	1	2021
Delaware	1	2001
UMBC	1	2007
New Hampshire	0	
Binghamton	0	
Bryant	0	
UMass Lowell	0	
NJIT	0	

- Schools highlighted in pink are former members of the America East Conference

== See also ==
- America East men's basketball tournament
