= Alisa Kresge =

American basketball player and coach

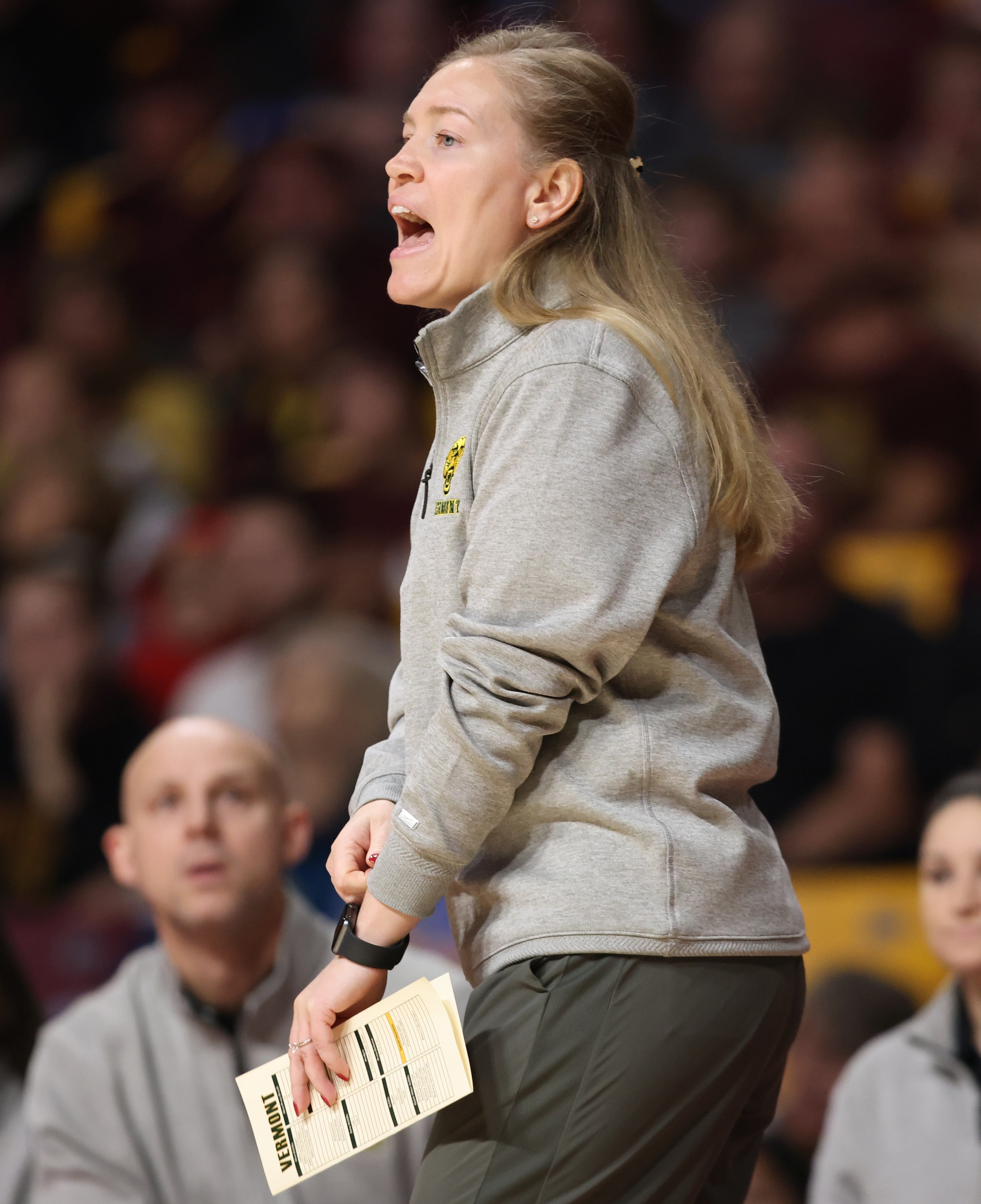
- Kresge in 2024

Current position
- Title: Head coach
- Team: Richmond
- Conference: Atlantic 10
- Record: 5–2 (.714)

Biographical details
- Born: April 1, 1985 (age 41); Holmdel Township, New Jersey, U.S.

Playing career
- 2003–2007: Marist

Coaching career (HC unless noted)
- 2009–2016: Marist (assistant)
- 2016–2018: Vermont (assistant)
- 2018–2026: Vermont
- 2026–present: Richmond

Head coaching record
- Overall: 150–91 (.622)

Accomplishments and honors

Championships
- 2 America East regular season (2023, 2026); 3 America East tournament (2023, 2025, 2026)

Awards
- 2 America East Coach of the Year (2023, 2026)

Alisa Kresge (born April 1, 1985) is an American basketball coach and former player. She is the head coach of the Richmond Spiders women's basketball team. From 2018 to 2026, she coached for Vermont.

== Playing career ==
Raised in Holmdel Township, New Jersey, Kresge played prep basketball at Red Bank Catholic High School.

Kresge played at Marist where she was part of four MAAC regular-season title teams, and three MAAC tournament championship teams. With the Red Foxes, Kresge made three NCAA tournament appearances as a player, culminating in a Sweet 16 appearance in 2007. She graduated as the school's all-time leader in assists with 596, and second all-time in steals with 222.

=== Marist statistics ===
Legend
GP	Games played	GS	Games started	MPG	Minutes per game
FG%	Field goal percentage	3P%	3-point field goal percentage	FT%	Free throw percentage
RPG	Rebounds per game	APG	Assists per game	SPG	Steals per game
BPG	Blocks per game	PPG	Points per game	**Bold**	Career high

Year	Team	GP	Points	FG%	3P%	FT%	RPG	APG	SPG	BPG	PPG
2003–04	Marist	31	59	32.1	31.3	40.0	3.6	2.3	1.4	0.2	1.9
2004–05	Marist	29	92	**32.6**	**40.6**	44.2	**4.7**	5.6	1.8	0.1	3.2
2005–06	Marist	30	87	24.5	24.0	**54.7**	4.0	**5.8**	1.7	**0.3**	2.9
2006–07	Marist	**35**	**111**	28.2	25.5	54.5	3.6	5.4	**2.1**	0.1	**3.2**
Career		125	349	28.9	28.9	49.1	4.0	4.8	1.8	0.2	2.8

== Coaching career ==
=== Marist ===
In 2009, Kresge joined the coaching staff of her alma mater under Brian Giorgis. The Red Foxes would reach the postseason six of the eight years she was on staff with five NCAA tournament appearances and a WNIT appearance.

=== Vermont ===
Kresge joined the coaching staff at Vermont in 2016, serving as associate head coach under Chris Day. After Day resigned his position amid an investigation into his verbal conduct and subsequently took an assistant coaching position at La Salle, Kresge was given the title of interim head coach for the 2018–19 season.

During her interim coaching season, Kresge guided the Catamounts to its best record in nearly a decade going 11–18 overall for the most wins since the 2009–10 season. On April 9, 2019 the interim tag was officially lifted and Kresge was named the ninth head coach in Vermont women's basketball history. During the 2021–22 season, Kresge led the Catamounts to the first 20-win season since the 2009–10 season, finishing with a 20–11 overall record and an appearance in the semifinals of the 2022 America East tournament. The following season, the Catamounts claimed the America East regular-season title for the first time in 21 years, and the America East tournament title for the first time since 2010, earning an appearance in the 2023 NCAA tournament. Vermont faced second-seeded UConn, falling 95–52.

The 2023–24 season saw Kresge guide Vermont to a 25–12 overall record, earning the team a berth in the 2024 WNIT, where it won three games en route to the Fab 4, falling to Saint Louis at Patrick Gym 57–54. In 2024–25, the Catamounts finished 21–13, capturing the 2025 America East tournament, and a bid to the 2025 NCAA Tournament, where they lost to NC State 75–55. The following season would see Kresge guide Vermont to both the America East regular season and tournament titles, with a 27–8 record, earning a bid to the 2026 NCAA Tournament where the Catamounts fell as a 13–seed in the first round to Louisville. During the season, Kresge became Vermont's all-time coaching wins leader in a 61–59 win over Dartmouth on December 28, 2025.

=== Richmond ===
On April 11, 2026, Kresge was named the head women's basketball coach at Richmond.

== Head coaching record ==
Record table
Season	Team	Overall	Conference	Standing	Postseason
Vermont Catamounts (America East) (2018–2026)
2018–19	Vermont	11–18	7–9	6th	
2019–20	Vermont	12–18	6–10	7th	
2020–21	Vermont	4–2*	4–2	9th	
2021–22	Vermont	20–11	13–5	4th	
2022–23	Vermont	25–7	14–2	T–1st	NCAA First Round
2023–24	Vermont	25–12	12–4	3rd	WNIT Fab 4
2024–25	Vermont	21–13	13–3	2nd	NCAA First Round
2025–26	Vermont	27–8	13–3	1st	NCAA First Round
Vermont:		145–89 (.620)	82–38 (.683)		
Richmond Spiders (Atlantic 10 Conference) (2026–present)
2026–27	Richmond	5–2	–		
Richmond:		5–2 (.714)	– (–)		
Total:		150–91 (.622)			
National champion Postseason invitational champion Conference regular season champion Conference regular season and conference tournament champion Division regular season champion Division regular season and conference tournament champion Conference tournament champion

- Vermont discontinued its season due to COVID-19 on January 24, 2021.
