= Maureen Magarity =

American college basketball coach (born 1981)

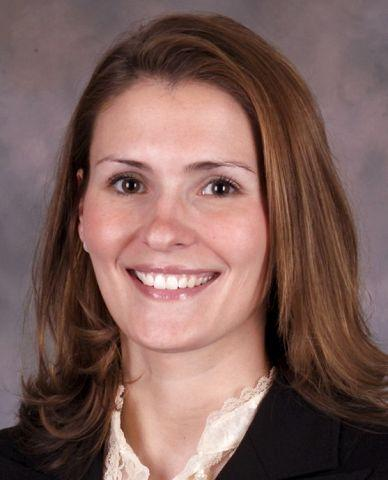
- Magarity in 2006

Current position
- Title: Head coach
- Team: Vermont
- Conference: America East
- Record: 0–0 (–)

Biographical details
- Born: March 4, 1981 (age 45); Altoona, Pennsylvania, U.S.

Playing career
- 1999–2000: Boston College
- 2001–2004: Marist

Coaching career (HC unless noted)
- 2004–2005: Marist (assistant)
- 2005–2006: Fairfield (assistant)
- 2006–2010: Army (assistant)
- 2010–2020: New Hampshire
- 2020–2024: Holy Cross
- 2026–present: Vermont

Head coaching record
- Overall: 218–196 (.527)

Accomplishments and honors

Championships
- Patriot League tournament (2023); Patriot League regular season (2022); America East regular season (2017)

Awards
- Patriot League Coach of the Year (2022); America East Coach of the Year (2017); Kay Yow Award (2017)

Maureen Elizabeth Magarity (born March 4, 1981) is an American women's basketball coach for Vermont Catamounts women's basketball. She previously served in the same role for the Holy Cross Crusaders women's basketball team from 2020 to 2024, and University of New Hampshire from 2010 to 2020.

== Early life and education ==
Born in Altoona, Pennsylvania raised in Wappingers Falls, New York, Magarity graduated from Our Lady of Lourdes High School in Poughkeepsie in 1999. At Our Lady of Lourdes, Magarity averaged 18 points and 10 rebounds in her senior basketball season and was a USA Today Honorable Mention All-American.

Magarity played in the 1999–2000 season at Boston College before transferring to Marist, close to her native Poughkeepsie home, and where her father Dave served as the men's basketball coach for the Red Foxes. A two-time captain, Magarity led the team in scoring with 14.3 points per game and was named Second Team All–MAAC in the 2002–03 season. Then as a senior in 2003–04, Magarity averaged 12.6 points and 4.9 rebounds. She was again a second-team All-MAAC honoree while leading the team to the 2004 NCAA Division I women's basketball tournament for the first time in school history.

=== College playing statistics ===
Legend
GP	Games played	GS	Games started	MPG	Minutes per game
FG%	Field goal percentage	3P%	3-point field goal percentage	FT%	Free throw percentage
RPG	Rebounds per game	APG	Assists per game	SPG	Steals per game
BPG	Blocks per game	PPG	Points per game	**Bold**	Career high

Year	Team	GP	Points	FG%	3P%	FT%	RPG	APG	SPG	BPG	PPG
1999–00	Boston College	20	40	**61.5%**	0.0%	61.5%	1.2	0.2	0.2	0.1	2.0
2000–01	Marist	Sat out due to NCAA transfer rules.									
2001–02	Marist	21	98	36.6%	0.0%	69.8%	3.2	0.7	0.3	0.5	4.7
2002–03	Marist	29	**414**	50.2%	23.1%	**76.6%**	**5.1**	1.7	**0.7**	**1.0**	**14.3**
2003–04	Marist	**31**	392	43.6%	**37.5%**	74.5%	4.9	**2.5**	0.5	0.9	12.6
Career		101	944	46.0%	29.0%	74.1%	3.9	1.4	0.5	0.7	9.3

== Coaching career ==
After graduation, Magarity joined Marist's women's basketball staff for one season, then had a one-year stop as an assistant coach at Fairfield, before joining her father's staff at Army.

=== New Hampshire ===
On May 10, 2010, Magarity was hired as the sixth head coach in New Hampshire women's basketball history. After a 9–20 season her first year, Magarity guided the Wildcats to a 16–14 record and 4th place finish in the America East and the school's second-ever postseason appearance in the 2012 WBI. During the 2016–17 season, Magarity led UNH to a school record 26 wins and its first-ever America East regular season title, and an appearance in the 2017 WNIT. Magarity was the Kay Yow Coach of the Year, finalist for the WBCA National Coach of the Year, and America East Coach of the Year in 2017. She was also named one of the Thirty Up-And-Coming Women's Basketball Coaches You Should Know by High-Post Hoops in 2018.

=== Holy Cross ===
On April 14, 2020, Magarity was named the seventh head coach in Holy Cross women's basketball history. On March 2, 2022, Magarity won the Patriot League Regular Season Championship with the Crusaders. Days later, on March 4, 2022, Magarity was named the Patriot League Coach of the Year after guiding the Crusaders to a 20–9 overall record and 14–4 mark in league play. The 14 conference wins stand as the most in program history. On August 20, 2024, Magarity stepped down as head coach due to family reasons.

=== Vermont ===
On April 13, 2026, Magarity was named the 10th head coach in Vermont women's basketball history, replacing Alisa Kresge, who departed to become the head coach at Richmond.

== Personal life ==
Her father Dave is the former head women's basketball coach at Army, and former men's basketball coach at Saint Francis (PA) and Marist. Her brother Dave also played basketball at Marist. Additionally, her aunts Anne and Rosemary respectively played at La Salle and Villanova, her uncle Bill played at Georgia, and Bill's daughter Regan played at Virginia Tech.

Dave and Maureen are the first father-daughter pair to have coached against one another in NCAA Division I basketball history, with the first matchup between them being Holy Cross' visit to Army on January 9, 2021.

Magarity is married to Vermont men’s basketball head coach John Becker.

Magarity and Becker are the second married couple to have coached the men's and women's teams at the same school in NCAA Division I basketball history. Lewis Jackson and Freda Freeman-Jackson of Alabama State were the first.

== Head coaching record ==
Record table
Season	Team	Overall	Conference	Standing	Postseason
New Hampshire Wildcats (America East Conference) (2010–2020)
2010–11	New Hampshire	9–20	6–10	6th	
2011–12	New Hampshire	16–14	9–7	4th	WBI First Round
2012–13	New Hampshire	12–18	6–10	5th	
2013–14	New Hampshire	19–12	12–4	3rd	
2014–15	New Hampshire	17–12	9–5	4th	
2015–16	New Hampshire	12–18	6–10	7th	
2016–17	New Hampshire	26–6	15–1	1st	WNIT First Round
2017–18	New Hampshire	19–12	9–7	5th	
2018–19	New Hampshire	6–24	3–13	T–7th	
2019–20	New Hampshire	10–19	7–9	5th	
New Hampshire:		146–155 (.485)	82–76 (.519)		
Holy Cross Crusaders (Patriot League) (2020–2024)
2020–21	Holy Cross	7–8	7–7	2nd (North)	
2021–22	Holy Cross	20–11	14–4	1st	WNIT First Round
2022–23	Holy Cross	24–9	13–5	2nd	NCAA First Round
2023–24	Holy Cross	21–13	11–7	1st	NCAA First Round
Holy Cross:		72–41 (.637)	45–23 (.662)		
Vermont Catamounts (America East Conference) (2026–present)
2026–27	Vermont	0–0	0–0		
Vermont:		0–0 (–)	0–0 (–)		
Total:		218–196 (.527)			
National champion Postseason invitational champion Conference regular season champion Conference regular season and conference tournament champion Division regular season champion Division regular season and conference tournament champion Conference tournament champion
