= 2022 America East women's basketball tournament =

- Classification: Division I
- Season: 2021–22
- Teams: 8
- Site: Campus sites
- Champions: Albany (7th title)
- Winning coach: Colleen Mullen (1st title)
- MVP: Kayla Cooper (Albany)
- Television: ESPN+ ESPN2
- America East women's basketball tournaments

The 2022 America East Women's Basketball Conference tournament was the postseason women's basketball tournament for the America East Conference that began March 5, 2022 and ended with the final on March 11, 2022. The second-seeded Albany Great Danes defeated the top seed Maine Black Bears in the tournament final to advance to the 2022 NCAA tournament, their seventh tournament appearance. All tournament games were played on the home arenas of the higher-seeded school.

2021–22 America East Conference women's basketball standings
	Conf.				Overall
Team	W		L	PCT	W		L	PCT
Maine	15	–	3	.833	20	–	12	.625
Stony Brook*	14	–	4	.778	23	–	6	.793
Albany †	13	–	5	.722	23	–	10	.697
Vermont	13	–	5	.722	20	–	11	.645
NJIT	9	–	8	.529	15	–	15	.500
UMass Lowell	8	–	9	.471	11	–	16	.407
Binghamton	5	–	13	.278	9	–	20	.310
New Hampshire	4	–	12	.250	7	–	21	.250
Hartford	4	–	14	.222	4	–	26	.133
UMBC	2	–	14	.125	3	–	23	.115
*Ineligible for the AmEast Tournament due to a postseason ban imposed by the AmEast.
† 2022 America East tournament winner

== Seeds ==
Eight of the ten America East teams qualified for the tournament. Stony Brook was not eligible for the tournament due to a postseason ban imposed by the conference. The teams were seeded by record in conference, with a tiebreaker system to seed teams with identical conference records.

Seed	School	AEC Record	Tiebreaker
1	Maine	15–3	
2	Albany	13–5	1–1 vs. Vermont; 0–2 vs. Maine; 1–1 vs. Stony Brook
3	Vermont	13–5	1–1 vs. Albany; 0–2 vs. Maine; 0–2 vs. Stony Brook
4	NJIT	9–8	
5	UMass Lowell	8–9	
6	Binghamton	5–13	
7	New Hampshire	4–12	
8	Hartford	4–14	

== Schedule ==
Game	Time*	Matchup^{#}	Score	Television
Quarterfinals – Saturday, March 5, 2022
1	1:00 pm	No. 8 Hartford at No. 1 Maine	49–63	ESPN+
2	2:00 pm	No. 7 New Hampshire at No. 2 Albany	44–49	ESPN+
3	4:00 pm	No. 5 UMass Lowell at No. 4 NJIT	33–47	ESPN+
4	2:30 pm	No. 6 Binghamton at No. 3 Vermont	63–71	ESPN+
Semifinals – Tuesday, March 8, 2022
5	7:00 p.m.	No. 4 NJIT at No. 1 Maine	48-72	ESPN+
6	7:00 p.m.	No. 3 Vermont at No. 2 Albany	54-67	ESPN+
Championship – Friday, March 11, 2022
7	5:00 pm	No. 1 Maine vs. No. 2 Albany	47-56	ESPN2
*Game times in EST. #-Rankings denote tournament seeding.

== Bracket ==
Quarterfinals; Saturday, March 5, 2022; ESPN+
1	Maine	63
8	Hartford	49
4	NJIT	47
5	UMass Lowell	33
(Pairings are reseeded after the first round)
3	Vermont	71
6	Binghamton	63
2	Albany	49
7	New Hampshire	44

Semifinals; Tuesday March 8, 2022; ESPN+
1	Maine	72
4	NJIT	48
2	Albany	67
3	Vermont	54

Championship; Friday, March 11, 2022; ESPN2
1	Maine	47
2	Albany	56

== See also ==
- 2022 America East men's basketball tournament
- America East Conference women's basketball tournament
