= Holy Cross Crusaders women's basketball =

Women's college basketball team

2025–26 Holy Cross Crusaders women's basketball team
- University: College of the Holy Cross
- Head coach: Candice Green (2nd season)
- Location: Worcester, Massachusetts
- Arena: Hart Center (capacity: 3,536)
- Conference: Patriot
- Nickname: Crusaders
- Colors: Royal purple
- Student section: TBD

NCAA Division I tournament round of 32
- 1985, 1991

NCAA Division I tournament appearances
- 1985, 1989, 1991, 1995, 1996, 1998, 1999, 2000, 2001, 2003, 2005, 2007, 2023, 2024, 2026

Conference tournament champions
- 1985, 1989, 1991, 1993, 1995, 1996, 1998, 1999, 2000, 2001, 2003, 2005, 2007, 2023, 2024, 2026

Conference regular-season champions
- 1984, 1991, 1993, 1995, 1997, 1998, 1999, 2000, 2001, 2002, 2003, 2005, 2022, 2024

Uniforms
Home	Away

The Holy Cross Crusaders women's basketball team is the women's basketball team that represents the College of the Holy Cross in Worcester, Massachusetts. The team currently competes in the Patriot League. The Crusaders are currently coached by head coach Candice Green.

== History ==
The Crusaders began play in 1974. They went 0–12, coached by Sharon Dupre in her only season. For their first six years (1974–1980), the Crusaders were in Division III, going 37–60 during that time. From 1980 to 1982, the Crusaders were in Division II, going 43–8 during their two season tenure before making the jump to Division I. The Crusaders joined the Metro Atlantic Athletic Conference in 1983. In their seven season tenure, they won two conference tournaments. In 1990, the Crusaders joined the Patriot League. They have won the Patriot League women's basketball tournament 14 times, the most of any school in the League.

== Postseason ==
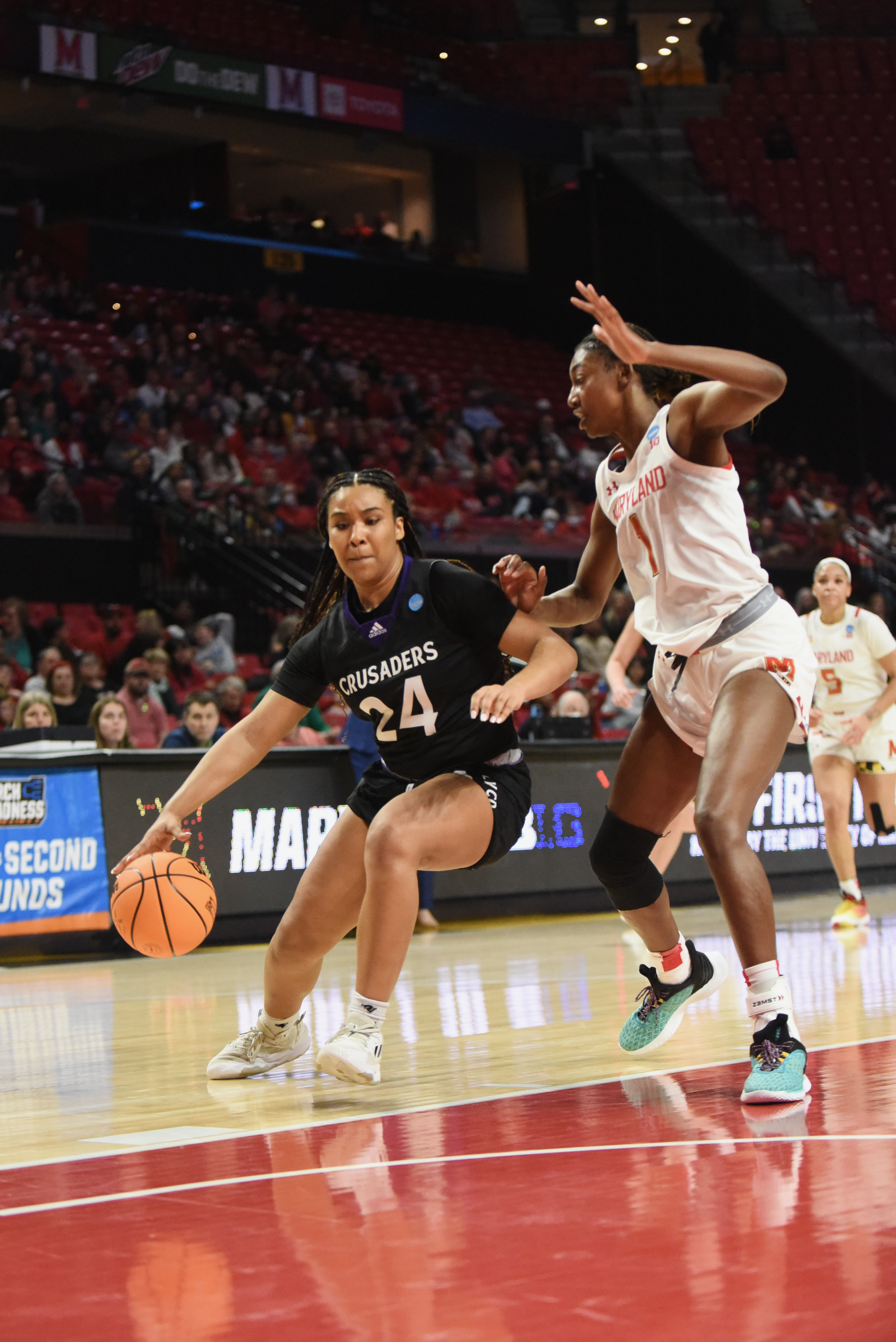
The Crusaders basketball team in the 2023 NCAA Division I women's basketball tournament

=== NCAA tournament results ===
The Crusaders have appeared in the NCAA Tournament 15 times. Their record is 2–15.

Year	Seed	Round	Opponent	Result
1985	7	Round of 32	Ohio State	L 102–60
1989	9	Round of 48	Temple	L 90–80
1991	11	Round of 48; Round of 32	Maryland; Auburn	W 81–74 (OT); L 84–58
1995	16	Round of 64	Colorado	L 83–49
1996	15	Round of 64	Old Dominion	L 83–56
1998	14	Round of 64	Louisiana Tech	L 86–58
1999	14	Round of 64	Duke	L 79–51
2000	15	Round of 64	Rutgers	L 91–70
2001	14	Round of 64	Florida	L 84–52
2003	13	Round of 64	Penn State	L 64–33
2005	15	Round of 64	Ohio State	L 89–46
2007	16	Round of 64	Duke	L 81–44
2023	15	Round of 64	Maryland	L 93–61
2024	16	First Four; Round of 64	UT Martin; Iowa	W 72–45; L 91–65
2026	15	First Round	Michigan	L 48–83

=== WNIT results ===
The Crusaders have appeared in the Women's National Invitation Tournament (WNIT) twice.

Year	Round	Opponent	Result
2002	First Round	Vermont	L 70–63
2022	First Round	Columbia	L 80–69

=== WBI results ===
The Crusaders have appeared in the Women's Basketball Invitational (WBI) once.

Year	Round	Opponent	Result
2012	First Round; Quarterfinal	New Hampshire; Manhattan	W 63–59; L 78–63

== Player accolades ==
=== MAAC Player of the Year ===
- 1985 – Janet Hourihan
- 1987 – Tracy Quinn

=== Patriot League Player of the Year ===
- 1991 – Mary Helen Walker
- 1992 – Norinne Powers
- 1993 – Norinne Powers
- 1994 – Laurie Carson
- 1995 – Lauren Maney
- 1996 – Lauren Maney
- 1997 – Kathy Courtney
- 1998 – Amy O’Brien
- 1999 – Amy O’Brien
- 2000 – Anna Kinne
- 2008 – Briana McFadden
- 2021–22 – Avery Labarbra

== Coaching history ==
Coach	Years	Record	Conference; Record	Conference; Titles
Sharon Dupre	1974–1975	0–12 (.000)	N/A	
Pat Corcoran	1975–1978	21–26 (.447)	N/A	
Kevin McAuley	1979–1980	16–22 (.421)	N/A	
Togo Palazzi	1980–1985	103–28 (.786)	18–6 (.750)	1
Bill Gibbons	1985–2019	613–410 (.599)	273–134 (.671)	11
Ann McInerney (interim)	2019–2020	26–15 (.634)	17–10 (.630)	
Maureen Magarity	2020–2024	72–41 (.637)	45–23 (.662)	1
Candice Green	2025–	42–22 (.656)	25–11 (.694)	1
Totals		893–576 (.608)	378–184 (.673)	14

== Season-by-season results ==
Holy Cross played in the Metro Atlantic Athletic Conference (MAAC) 1983 to 1990 before joining the Patriot League in 1990.

Season	Record	Conference record
1974–75	0–12	n/a
1975–76	8–7	n/a
1976–77	8–9	n/a
1977–78	5–10	n/a
1978–79	7–10	n/a
1979–80	9–12	n/a
1980–81	20–4	n/a
1981–82	23–4	n/a
1982–83	19–6	n/a
1983–84	20–7	9–3
1984–85	21–7	9–3
1985–86	21–7	8–4
1986–87	19–10	8–4
1987–88	21–8	9–3
1988–89	21–10	10–2
1989–90	20–10	7–3
1990–91	25–6	12–0
1991–92	16–13	10–4
1992–93	22–7	12–2
1993–94	15–14	10–4
1994–95	21–9	12–2
1995–96	23–10	9–3
1996–97	23–4	12–0
1997–98	21–9	10–2
1998–99	21–8	11–1
1999–00	23–7	11–1
2000–01	21–9	11–1
2001–02	23–8	12–2
2002–03	24–8	13–1
2003–04	13–15	8–6
2004–05	20–11	12–2
2005–06	16–14	10–4
2006–07	15–18	7–7
2007–08	19–13	10–4
2008–09	13–17	8–6
2009–10	10–21	5–9
2010–11	10–20	6–8
2011–12	19–15	7–7
2012–13	18–14	8–6
2013–14	20–14	10–8
2014–15	15–17	11–7
2015–16	13–17	10–8
2016–17	8–21	6–12
2017–18	13–18	7–11
2018–19	18–13	9–9
2019–20	19–11	7–4
2020–21	7–8	7–7
2020–21	20–9	14–4
2021–22	20–11	14–4
2022–23	24–9	13–5
2023–24	21–13	11–7
2024–25	19–12	11–7
2025–26	23–10	14–4
2026–27	0–0	0–0
TOTAL	872–560	414–169
