= Courtnay Pilypaitis =

Canadian basketball player and coach

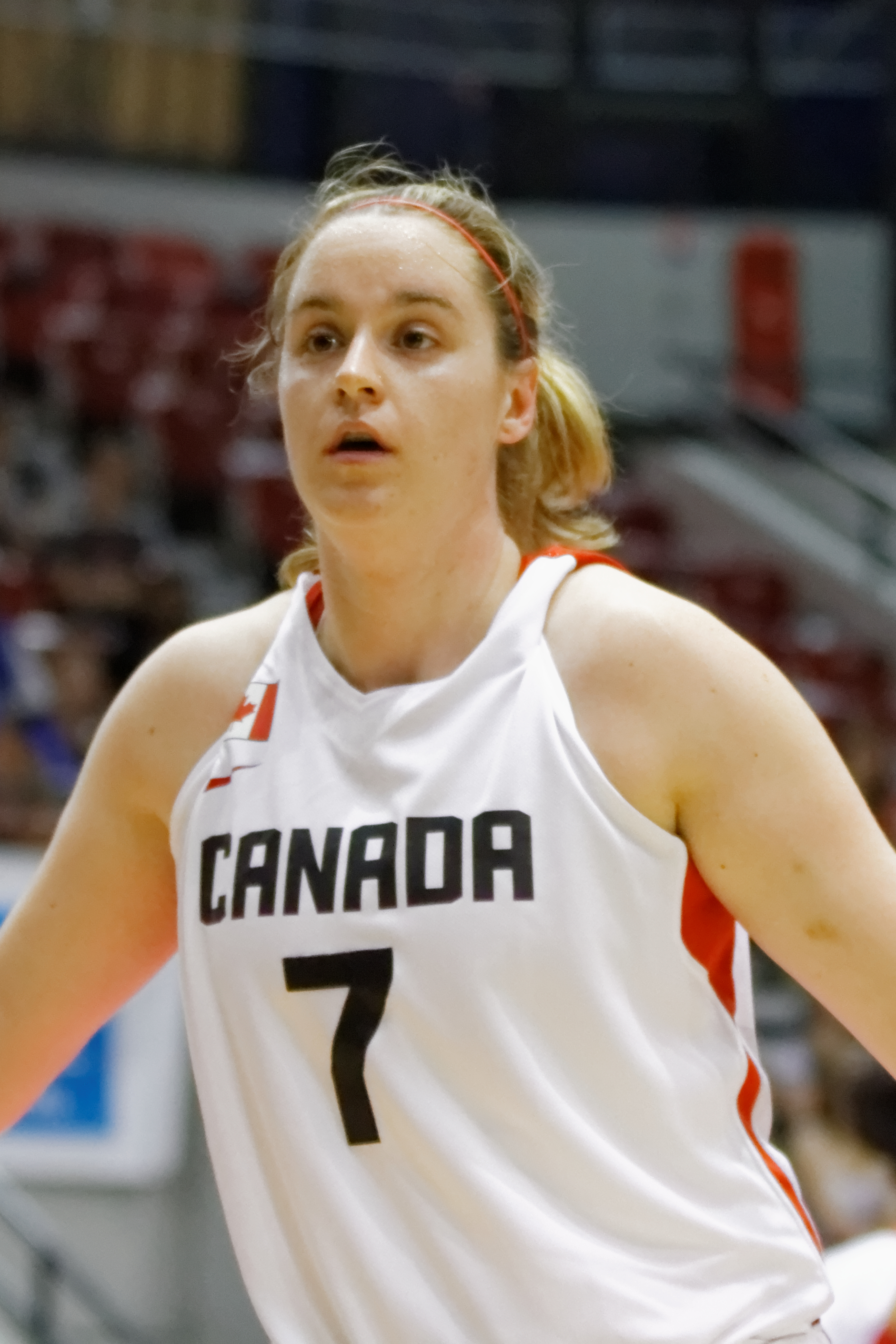
- Pilypaitis in 2013

Cornell Big Red
- Title: Assistant coach
- League: Ivy League

Personal information
- Born: February 11, 1988 (age 38)
- Listed height: 6 ft 1 in (1.85 m)

Career information
- High school: St. Peter (Orleans, Ontario)
- College: Vermont (2006–2010)
- WNBA draft: 2010: undrafted
- Playing career: 2010–2015
- Position: Shooting guard

Career history

Playing
- 2010–2011: VIČI-Aistės

Coaching
- 2012–2016: Vermont (asst.)
- 2016–2019: UMBC (asst.)
- 2021–2025: Fresno State (asst.)
- 2025–present: Cornell (asst.)

Career highlights
- America East Conference POY (2008); 2x AEC Tournament MOP (2009, 2010)
Medals
Women's basketball
Representing Canada
FIBA Americas Women's Championship
Silver medal – second place	2013 Mexico	Team competition

Courtnay Pilypaitis (born February 11, 1988) is a Canadian women's basketball coach and former professional basketball player. She played for Canada women's national basketball team. She competed in the 2012 Summer Olympics. She is 1.85 m (6 ft 1 in) tall.

Pilypaitis attended the University of Vermont, where she graduated in 2010. She returned to her alma mater as an assistant coach during the 2012–13 season. Pilypaitis retired as a player in April 2015.

== FIBA ==
She was invited to join the national team, to play in the 2013 FIBA Americas Championship for Women, held in Xalapa, Mexico from 21 to 28 September 2013. She averaged 3.2 points per game, and helped the Canadian National team to a second place, silver medal finish. Canada faced Cuba in a preliminary round and won 53–40, but in the championship game, Cuba prevailed 79–71.

== Coaching career ==
In July 2016, she was named as an assistant coach with the UMBC Retrievers women's basketball team. Pilypaitis became an assistant coach for the Fresno State Bulldogs of the Mountain West Conference during 2021–22 season. Since the 2025–26 season, she has been an assistant coach for the Cornell Big Red women's basketball team.

== Personal life ==
Pilypaitis was born to a family of Lithuanian descent.

== Career statistics ==
=== College ===
Ratios
Year	Team	GP	FG%	3P%	FT%	RBG	APG	BPG	SPG	PPG
2006–07	Vermont	31	42.4%	36.5%	69.8%	5.29	4.07	0.29	1.90	13.74
2007–08	Vermont	33	41.1%	40.2%	83.1%	6.94	5.46	0.64	1.61	16.82
2008–09	Vermont	33	42.0%	38.7%	78.7%	7.30	5.03	0.30	2.12	15.18
2009–10	Vermont	34	39.7%	36.6%	79.1%	8.00	4.82	0.29	2.85	15.03
Career		131	41.2%	38.0%	78.4%	6.92	4.85	0.38	2.13	15.21

Totals
Year	Team	GP	FG	FGA	3P	3PA	FT	FTA	REB	A	BK	ST	PTS
2006–07	Vermont	31	144	340	57	156	81	116	164	126	9	59	426
2007–08	Vermont	33	165	401	68	169	157	189	229	180	21	53	555
2008–09	Vermont	33	158	376	67	173	118	150	241	166	10	70	501
2009–10	Vermont	34	163	411	68	186	117	148	272	164	10	97	511
Career		131	630	1528	260	684	473	603	906	636	50	279	1993
