= 2022–23 Vermont Catamounts women's basketball team =

Intercollegiate basketball team

2022–23 Vermont Catamounts women's basketball

America East regular-season and tournament champions

NCAA tournament, first round
- Conference: America East Conference
- Record: 25–7 (14–2 America East)
- Head coach: Alisa Kresge (4th season)
- Associate head coach: Dominique Bryant
- Assistant coaches: Will Lanie; Nevena Markovic
- Home arena: Patrick Gym

2022–23 America East Conference women's basketball standings
	Conf.				Overall
Team	W		L	PCT	W		L	PCT
Vermont†	14	–	2	.875	25	–	7	.781
Albany	14	–	2	.875	22	–	12	.647
Maine	11	–	5	.688	16	–	14	.533
UMBC	10	–	6	.625	14	–	15	.483
NJIT	8	–	8	.500	13	–	16	.448
Binghamton	6	–	10	.375	13	–	17	.433
UMass Lowell	4	–	12	.250	5	–	22	.185
Bryant	3	–	13	.188	9	–	21	.300
New Hampshire	2	–	14	.125	7	–	21	.250
† 2023 AmEast Tournament winner As of March 17, 2023

The 2022–23 Vermont Catamounts women's basketball team represented the University of Vermont during the 2022–23 NCAA Division I women's basketball season. The Catamounts, led by fourth-head coach Alisa Kresge, played their home games in the Patrick Gym in Burlington, Vermont and were members in the America East Conference.

== Roster ==
2022–23 Vermont Catamounts women's basketball team
Players
Coaches

Pos.	#	Name	Height	Year	Previous school	Hometown
F	2	Aryana Dizon	6 ft 2 in (1.88 m)	So	Carrollwood Day School	Tampa, FL
G	3	Carla Celaya	5 ft 11 in (1.8 m)	Fr	Barcelona	Barcelona, Spain
G	4	Andjela Matic	5 ft 8 in (1.73 m)	Fr	ŽKK Šabac	Ub, Serbia
G	10	Bella Vito	5 ft 9 in (1.75 m)	So	Montville Township	Towaco, NJ
G	11	Nika Kurdija	5 ft 9 in (1.75 m)	Fr	Slavonski Brod	Vrba, Croatia
G	12	Keira Hanson	5 ft 8 in (1.73 m)	Fr	Issaquah	Issaquah, WA
G	13	Paula Gonzalez	5 ft 11 in (1.8 m)	Fr	Vitória S.C.	Sarria, Spain
G	14	Catherine Gilwee	5 ft 8 in (1.73 m)	So	Champlain Valley Union	Shelburne, VT
F	21	Maria Myklebust	6 ft 1 in (1.85 m)	So	Montverde Academy	Asker, Norway
G	22	Marissa McDonald	6 ft 1 in (1.85 m)	RS So	West Chester East	West Chester, PA
G	23	Emma Utterback	5 ft 8 in (1.73 m)	Sr	Center Grove	Greenwood, IN
F	24	Anna Olson	6 ft 1 in (1.85 m)	Jr	Monticello	Monticello, MN
C	25	Nikola Priede	6 ft 2 in (1.88 m)	Fr	TTT Riga	Riga, Latvia
F	33	Delaney Richason	6 ft 1 in (1.85 m)	Sr	Zionsville	Zionsville, IN
F	44	Carly Whiteside	6 ft 2 in (1.88 m)	Sr	Barnstable	Barnstable, MA

Head coach

- Alisa Kresge (Marist)

Assistant coach(es)

- Dominique Bryant (Saint Joseph's)
- Will Lanie (Georgia Tech)
- Nevena Markovic (IUPUI)

Legend

- (C) Team captain
- (S) Suspended
- (I) Ineligible
- (W) Walk-on
- Injured
- Current redshirt

Roster
Last update: October 17, 2024

== Schedule ==
Date time, TV	Rank^{#}	Opponent^{#}	Result	Record	Site (attendance) city, state
Exhibition
November 4, 2022*; 6:00 p.m.		Saint Michael's	W 72–38		Patrick Gym (713); Burlington, VT
Non-conference regular season
November 8, 2022*; 7:00 p.m., BTN+		at No. 11 Indiana	L 49–86	0–1	Simon Skjodt Assembly Hall (4,003); Bloomington, IN
November 11, 2022*; 10:15 a.m., ESPN+		at Miami (OH)	L 73–79	0–2	Millett Hall (1,676); Oxford, OH
November 15, 2022*; 6:00 p.m., ESPN+		American International	W 68–46	1–2	Patrick Gym (186); Burlington, VT
November 18, 2022*; 6:00 p.m., ESPN+		Delaware	L 53–58	1–3	Patrick Gym (457); Burlington, VT
November 21, 2022*; 6:00 p.m., ESPN+		Army	W 60–37	2–3	Patrick Gym (383); Burlington, VT
November 26, 2022*; 12:00 p.m., ESPN3		Stonehill; TD Bank Classic semifinals	W 70–48	3–3	Patrick Gym (638); Burlington, VT
November 27, 2022*; 3:00 p.m., ESPN+		Siena; TD Bank Classic championship	W 57–51	4–3	Patrick Gym (435); Burlington, VT
December 1, 2022*; 7:00 p.m., ESPN+		at Dartmouth	W 67–66	5–3	Leede Arena (358); Hanover, NH
December 4, 2022*; 2:00 p.m., ESPN+		Marist	W 81–60	6–3	Patrick Gym (639); Burlington, VT
December 8, 2022*; 5:00 p.m.		at Saint Francis (PA)	W 68–48	7–3	DeGol Arena (147); Loretto, PA
December 10, 2022*; 1:00 p.m., ESPN+		at Duquesne	L 54–56	7–4	UPMC Cooper Fieldhouse (735); Pittsburgh, PA
December 18, 2022*; 2:00 p.m.		at Sacred Heart	Canceled		William H. Pitt Center; Fairfield, CT
December 20, 2022*; 10:30 a.m., ESPN+		at Holy Cross	W 64–34	8–4	Hart Center (1,812); Worcester, MA
America East regular season
December 29, 2022; 7:00 p.m., ESPN+		at Albany	L 46–60	8–5 (0–1)	McDonough Sports Complex (916); Troy, NY
January 1, 2023; 2:00 p.m., ESPN+		UMBC	L 57–58	8–6 (0–2)	Patrick Gym (757); Burlington, VT
January 4, 2023; 7:00 p.m., ESPN+		at Bryant	W 68–67 ^{OT}	9–6 (1–2)	Chace Athletic Center (75); Smithfield, RI
January 7, 2023; 1:00 p.m., ESPN3		New Hampshire	W 72–55	10–6 (2–2)	Patrick Gym (769); Burlington, VT
January 11, 2023; 11:00 a.m., ESPN+		UMass Lowell	W 42–37	11–6 (3–2)	Patrick Gym (2,062); Burlington, VT
January 18, 2023; 7:00 p.m., ESPN+		at Maine	W 61–52	12–6 (4–2)	The Pit (954); Orono, ME
January 21, 2023; 7:00 p.m., ESPN3		at NJIT	W 65–32	13–6 (5–2)	Wellness and Events Center (337); Newark, NJ
January 25, 2023; 6:00 p.m., ESPN+		Binghamton	W 63–56	14–6 (6–2)	Patrick Gym (521); Burlington, VT
January 28, 2023; 12:00 p.m., ESPN+		at UMBC	W 64–51	15–6 (7–2)	Chesapeake Employers Insurance Arena (310); Catonsville, MD
February 4, 2023; 12:00 p.m., ESPN3		Albany	W 53–49	16–6 (8–2)	Patrick Gym (1,286); Burlington, VT
February 8, 2023; 6:00 p.m., ESPN+		Maine	W 68–60	17–6 (9–2)	Patrick Gym (718); Burlington, VT
February 11, 2023; 1:00 p.m., ESPN3		at UMass Lowell	W 58–39	18–6 (10–2)	Costello Athletic Center (252); Lowell, MA
February 15, 2023; 7:00 p.m., ESPN+		at New Hampshire	W 43–36	19–6 (11–2)	Lundholm Gym (331); Durham, NH
February 18, 2023; 2:00 p.m., ESPN3		NJIT	W 85–73	20–6 (12–2)	Patrick Gym (1,216); Burlington, VT
February 22, 2023; 7:00 p.m., ESPN+		at Binghamton	W 67–54	21–6 (13–2)	Binghamton University Events Center (1,186); Vestal, NY
February 25, 2023; 4:30 p.m., ESPN3		Bryant	W 64–41	22–6 (14–2)	Patrick Gym (1,187); Burlington, VT
America East women's tournament
March 1, 2023; 5:00 p.m., ESPN+	(1)	(8) Bryant; Quarterfinals	W 56–49	23–6	Patrick Gym (762); Burlington, VT
March 5, 2023; 1:00 p.m., ESPN+	(1)	(4) UMBC; Semifinals	W 75–63	24–6	Patrick Gym (1,225); Burlington, VT
March 10, 2023; 5:00 p.m., ESPNU	(1)	(2) Albany; Championship game	W 38–36	25–6	Patrick Gym (2,502); Burlington, VT
NCAA tournament
March 18, 2023*; 3:00 p.m., ABC	(15 S3)	at (2 S3) No. 6 UConn; First round	L 52–95	25–7	Harry A. Gampel Pavilion (8,043); Storrs, CT
*Non-conference game. ^{#}Rankings from AP poll. (#) Tournament seedings in parentheses. S3=Seattle 3. All times are in Eastern.

== See also ==
- 2022–23 Vermont Catamounts men's basketball team
