= 2022–23 Maine Black Bears women's basketball team =

Intercollegiate basketball season

2022–23 Maine Black Bears women's basketball
- Conference: America East Conference
- Record: 16–14 (11–5 America East)
- Head coach: Amy Vachon (6th season)
- Assistant coaches: Courtney England; Tom Biskup; Gadson Lefft
- Home arena: The Pit in Memorial Gymnasium

2022–23 America East Conference women's basketball standings
	Conf.				Overall
Team	W		L	PCT	W		L	PCT
Vermont†	14	–	2	.875	25	–	7	.781
Albany	14	–	2	.875	22	–	12	.647
Maine	11	–	5	.688	16	–	14	.533
UMBC	10	–	6	.625	14	–	15	.483
NJIT	8	–	8	.500	13	–	16	.448
Binghamton	6	–	10	.375	13	–	17	.433
UMass Lowell	4	–	12	.250	5	–	22	.185
Bryant	3	–	13	.188	9	–	21	.300
New Hampshire	2	–	14	.125	7	–	21	.250
† 2023 AmEast Tournament winner As of March 17, 2023

The 2022–23 Maine Black Bears women's basketball team represented the University of Maine in the 2022–23 NCAA Division I women's basketball season. The Black Bears, led by head coach Amy Vachon, played their home games at The Pit in Memorial Gymnasium on the University of Maine campus and were members of the America East Conference.

== Media ==
All home games and conference road games will stream on either ESPN3 or AmericaEast.tv. Most road games will stream on the opponents website. All games will be broadcast on the radio on WEZQ (92.9 The Ticket) and online on the Maine Portal.

== Roster ==
The Maine Black Bears currently have 15 different players on their team, the tallest player being Katie White at 6'2", and the shortest player being Olivia Rockwood at 5'5". They currently have 11 guards, and 4 forwards.

2019–20 Maine Black Bears women's basketball team
Players	Coaches
Pos. / # / Name / Height / Year / Previous school / Hometown	Head coach: Amy Vachon (Maine); Assistant coach(es) Legend: (C) Team captain; (S) Suspended; (I) Ineligible; (W) Walk-on; Injured; Current redshirt; Roster

== Schedule and results ==
The Maine Black Bears will play a total of 13 games in the non-conference regular season, and 16 games in the American East regular season.

Date time, TV	Rank^{#}	Opponent^{#}	Result	Record	Site (attendance) city, state
Non-conference regular season
November 7, 2022*; 7:00 pm, ESPN+		at James Madison	W 60–58	1–0	Atlantic Union Bank Center (2,092); Harrisonburg, VA
November 14, 2022*; 7:00 pm, NESN/ESPN+		at UMass	L 54–67	1–1	Mullins Center (799); Amherst, MA
November 19, 2022*; 6:00 pm, ESPN+/3		Yale	L 46–55	1–2	The Pit in Memorial Gymnasium (1,198); Orono, ME
November 21, 2022*; 7:00 pm, ESPN+/3		Northeastern	W 61–59	2–2	The Pit at Memorial Gymnasium (812); Orono, ME
November 25, 2022*; 3:00 pm, YouTube		vs. Kansas	L 49–76	2–3	UCU Stadium (112); Moraga, CA
November 26, 2022*; 3:00 pm, YouTube		vs. Niagara	W 73–57	3–3	UCU Stadium (55); Moraga, CA
November 28, 2022*; 9:00 pm, WCC Network		at No. 23 Gonzaga	L 43–62	3–4	McCarthey Athletic Center (4,602); Spokane, WA
December 2, 2022*; 7:00 pm, ESPN3		Princeton	L 51–65	3–5	The Pit in Memorial Gymnasium (965); Orono, ME
December 4, 2022*; 1:00 pm		at Rhode Island	L 43–63	3–6	Ryan Center (889); Kingston, RI
December 8, 2022*; 7:00 pm, ESPN+		Fordham	L 51–57	3–7	The Pit in Memorial Gymnasium (1,079); Orono, ME
December 11, 2022*; 1:00 pm, ESPN+		Army	W 88–60	4–7	The Pit in Memorial Gymnasium (1,115); Orono, ME
December 18, 2022*; 3:00 pm, NESN/ESPN+		at Harvard	L 56–84	4–8	Lavietes Pavilion (679); Cambridge, MA
December 22, 2022*; 8:00 pm, ESPN+		at Milwaukee	Canceled		Klotsche Center; Milwaukee, WI
America East regular season
December 29, 2022; 7:00 pm, ESPN+		at Bryant	W 74–62	5–8 (1–0)	Chace Athletic Center (115); Smithfield, RI
January 4, 2023; 7:00 pm, ESPN+		UMass Lowell	W 70–63 ^{OT}	6–8 (2–0)	The Pit in Memorial Gymnasium (740); Orono, ME
January 7, 2023; 2:00 pm, ESPN3		at New Jersey Institute of Technology	W 69–63	7–8 (3–0)	Fleisher Center (256); Newark, NJ
January 11, 2023; 7:00 pm		at New Hampshire	Postponed		Lundholm Gym; Durham, NH
January 14, 2023; 1:00 pm, ESPN+/3		UMBC	W 71–54	8–8 (4–0)	The Pit in Memorial Gymnasium (1,044); Orono, ME
January 18, 2023; 7:00 pm, ESPN+/3		Vermont	L 52–61	8–9 (4–1)	The Pit in Memorial Gymnasium (954); Orono, ME
January 21, 2023; 2:00 pm, ESPN3		at Binghamton	W 50–46	9–9 (5–1)	Binghamton University Events Center (1,170); Binghamton, NY
January 25, 2023; 11:00 am, ESPN+		at UMass Lowell	W 61–50	10–9 (6–1)	Costello Athletic Center (3,427); Lowell, MA
January 28, 2023; 1:00 pm, ESPN+/3		Albany	W 50–49	11–9 (7–1)	The Pit in Memorial Gymnasium (1,241); Orono, ME
February 1, 2023; 7:00 pm, ESPN+/3		Bryant	W 66–43	12–9 (8–1)	The Pit in Memorial Gymnasium (941); Orono, ME
February 4, 2023; 2:00 pm, ESPN3		at UMBC	L 57–74	12–10 (8–2)	Chesapeake Employers Insurance Arena (745); Catsonsville, MD
February 8, 2023; 6:00 pm, ESPN+		at Vermont	L 60–68	12–11 (8–3)	Patrick Gym (718); Burlington, VT
February 11, 2023; 1:00 pm, ESPN+/3		New Jersey Institute of Technology	L 54–56	12–12 (8–4)	The Pit in Memorial Gymnasium (1,199); Orono, ME
February 13, 2023; 12:00 pm, ESPN+/3		at New Hampshire; Border Battle	W 56–45	13–12 (9–4)	Lundholm Gym; Durham, NH
February 18, 2023; 7:00 pm, ESPN3		at Albany	L 50–53	13–13 (9–5)	McDonough Sports Complex (1,115); Troy, NY
February 22, 2023; 7:00 pm, ESPN+/3		New Hampshire; Border Battle	W 80–67	14–13 (10–5)	The Pit in Memorial Gymnasium (1,020); Orono, ME
February 25, 2023; 1:00 pm, ESPN+/3		Binghamton	W 69–65	15–13 (11–5)	The Pit in Memorial Gymnasium (1,369); Orono, ME
America East tournament
March 1, 2023; 7:00 pm, ESPN+	(3)	(6) Binghamton; Quarterfinals	W 64–54	16–13	The Pit in Memorial Gymnasium (1,065); Orono, ME
March 5, 2023; 3:00 pm, ESPN+	(3)	at (2) Albany; Semifinals	L 64–72	16–14	McDonough Sports Complex (688); Troy, NY
*Non-conference game. ^{#}Rankings from AP Poll. (#) Tournament seedings in parentheses. All times are in Eastern Time.

== See also ==
- 2022–23 Maine Black Bears men's basketball team
