= AEC Tournament =

AEC Tournament may refer to the championship of any sport sponsored by the Atlantic 10 Conference, including the following:

- America East Conference men's basketball tournament
- America East Conference baseball tournament
- America East Conference women's basketball tournament
