= Maryland basketball =

Maryland basketball may refer to any of the following teams:

== Men's teams ==
- Maryland Terrapins men's basketball
- UMBC Retrievers men's basketball
- University of Maryland Eastern Shore

== Women's teams ==
- Maryland Terrapins women's basketball
- UMBC Retrievers women's basketball
- University of Maryland Eastern Shore
