= Colleen Mullen =

American basketball player and coach

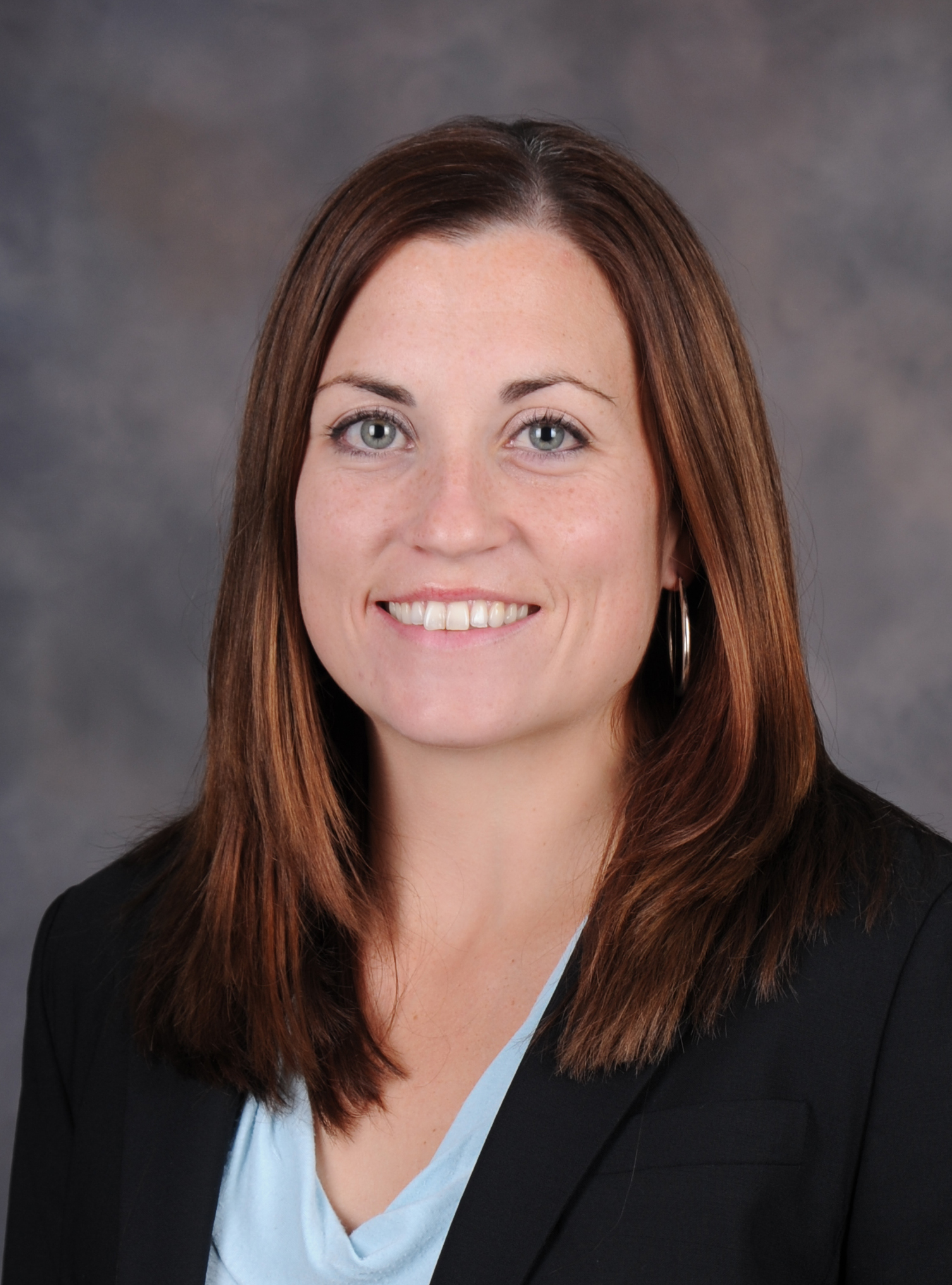
- Mullen in 2011

Current position
- Title: Head coach
- Team: Rhode Island
- Conference: Atlantic 10
- Record: 0–0 (–)

Biographical details
- Born: June 19, 1980 (age 46); Chelmsford, Massachusetts, U.S.

Playing career
- 1998–2000: Rhode Island
- 2001–2003: New Hampshire
- Position: Point guard

Coaching career (HC unless noted)
- 2005–2007: Southern New Hampshire (asst.)
- 2007–2008: Lehigh (asst.)
- 2008–2010: LIU (asst.)
- 2011–2012: Army (asst.)
- 2012–2018: Army (assoc. HC)
- 2018–2026: Albany
- 2026–present: Rhode Island

Administrative career (AD unless noted)
- 2004–2005: Northern Illinois (director of basketball operations)

Head coaching record
- Overall: 139–102 (.577)

Accomplishments and honors

Championships
- As head coach: America East Tournament (2022); 2x America East regular season (2023, 2025); As assistant coach: Patriot regular season (2016); 2× Patri Tournament (2014, 2016)

Colleen Margaret Mullen (born June 19, 1980) is an American college basketball coach and former player. She is the head coach of the Rhode Island women's basketball team.

== High school ==
Mullen played basketball and volleyball at Chelmsford High School in North Chelmsford, Massachusetts. She earned a letter in each of her four years as a basketball player. In her sophomore year she was named captain of the team and remained as captain through her junior and senior years. She earned MVP honors for her team in each of her last three years, and as a senior earned honorable mention All–USA Today honors. As a volleyball player, she lettered three times and help the team to the Division I North championship in her junior and senior years. As a volleyball player, she earned Globe All-Scholastic honors, and captained each of her three seasons.

== College ==
Mullen enrolled at the University of Rhode Island, where she played point guard and started all 27 games as a freshman. In her sophomore year, she averaged 9.5 points per game, second best on the team, and hit 86% of her free throws, best on the team.

After her sophomore year she transferred to the University of New Hampshire, where she sat out for one year due to transfer rules. She is in the school's top 20 for three-point field goals made and assists over her career despite only being at the school for two years. She earned a place on the America East honor roll in both her junior and senior years. Mullen was named captain of the team both year at UNH. While at New Hampshire, she earned a Bachelor of Science in business administration.

== Coaching ==
Even while playing in high school, Mullen knew she wanted a career as a basketball coach. She said, "Even as a young player, in my freshman year, I felt like I was trying to be a coach on the floor...That was my dream, what I wanted to do."

Her first coaching position was at Northern Illinois, where she worked as the director of basketball operations for the 2004–05 season. In 2005, she was hired as an assistant basketball coach at Southern New Hampshire University. She remained there for two seasons. While at SNHU, she completed her master's in business administration.

Mullen then spent a year as an assistant at Lehigh. After Lehigh, she served as an assistant for two seasons at Long Island University.

Mullen then went on to Army, where she remained for seven years. She was hired as an assistant coach in 2011, but was named associate head coach the following year. She primarily worked with the guards, including Kelsey Minato, who was the first player in Patriot League history to earn awards for both player and rookie of the year in the same year. Minato also earned All-America honorable mention by the AP and the WBCA as well as ESPN W mid-major player of the year.

In 2018, Mullen was named the new head coach of the Albany women's basketball team.

== Head coaching record ==
Record table
Season	Team	Overall	Conference	Standing	Postseason
Albany Great Danes (America East Conference) (2018–2026)
2018–19	Albany	13–18	9–7	4th	
2019–20	Albany	9–21	5–11	8th	
2020–21	Albany	7–11	5–7	4th	
2021–22	Albany	23–10	13–5	T–3rd	NCAA First round
2022–23	Albany	22–12	12–2	T–1st	WNIT First round
2023–24	Albany	25–7	13–3	2nd	WNIT First round
2024–25	Albany	26–7	14–2	1st	WBIT First Round
2025–26	Albany	14–16	4–12	T–7th	
Albany:		139–102 (.577)	75–52 (.591)		
Rhode Island Rams (Atlantic 10) (2026–present)
2026–27	Rhode Island	0–0	0–0		
Rhode Island:		0–0 (–)	0–0 (–)		
Total:		139–102 (.577)			
National champion Postseason invitational champion Conference regular season champion Conference regular season and conference tournament champion Division regular season champion Division regular season and conference tournament champion Conference tournament champion

== Career statistics ==
Legend
GP	Games played	GS	Games started	MPG	Minutes per game	RPG	Rebounds per game
APG	Assists per game	SPG	Steals per game	BPG	Blocks per game	PPG	Points per game
TO	Turnovers per game	FG%	Field-goal percentage	3P%	3-point field-goal percentage	FT%	Free-throw percentage
**Bold**	Career best	°	League leader

=== College ===
Year	Team	GP	GS	MPG	FG%	3P%	FT%	RPG	APG	SPG	BPG	TO	PPG
1998–99	Rhode Island	27	-	-	**32.6**	30.0	73.2	**7.8**	3.7	**1.1**	0.0	-	8.5
1999–2000	Rhode Island	17	-	-	29.2	24.4	**86.2**	0.9	3.0	**1.1**	0.1	-	**9.5**
2000–01	New Hampshire	Sat out due to NCAA Transfer Rules											
2001–02	New Hampshire	**29**	-	-	32.3	**34.0**	75.0	2.0	2.9	1.0	0.0	-	5.6
2002–03	New Hampshire	**29**	-	35.2	**32.6**	31.8	75.0	2.2	**4.6**	0.8	0.0	3.7	7.8
**Career**		102	-	35.2	31.8	31.0	78.2	3.4	3.6	1.0	0.0	3.7	7.6
Statistics retrieved from Sports-Reference.
