= 2021–22 Stony Brook Seawolves women's basketball team =

American college basketball season

2021–22 Stony Brook Seawolves women's basketball

WNIT, first round
- Conference: America East Conference
- Record: 23–6 (14–4 America East)
- Head coach: Ashley Langford (1st season)
- Assistant coaches: Shireyll Moore; Delmar Carey; Nicole Mitchell
- Home arena: Island Federal Credit Union Arena

2021–22 America East Conference women's basketball standings
	Conf.				Overall
Team	W		L	PCT	W		L	PCT
Maine	15	–	3	.833	20	–	12	.625
Stony Brook*	14	–	4	.778	23	–	6	.793
Albany †	13	–	5	.722	23	–	10	.697
Vermont	13	–	5	.722	20	–	11	.645
NJIT	9	–	8	.529	15	–	15	.500
UMass Lowell	8	–	9	.471	11	–	16	.407
Binghamton	5	–	13	.278	9	–	20	.310
New Hampshire	4	–	12	.250	7	–	21	.250
Hartford	4	–	14	.222	4	–	26	.133
UMBC	2	–	14	.125	3	–	23	.115
† 2022 America East tournament winner *Ineligible for the AmEast Tournament due to a postseason ban imposed by the AmEast.

The 2021–22 Stony Brook Seawolves women's basketball team represented Stony Brook University in the 2021–22 NCAA Division I women's basketball season. They played their home games at the Island Federal Credit Union Arena in Stony Brook, New York as members of the America East Conference. They were led by first-year head coach Ashley Langford, who took over the position after Caroline McCombs left to become the head coach for George Washington.

The 2021–22 season was the program's last as an America East member. Stony Brook joined the Colonial Athletic Association on July 1, 2022. In response, America East presidents voted to ban Stony Brook from conference tournament play on February 2, 2022, according to America East by-laws.

== Previous season ==
Stony Brook made the NCAA tournament for the first time in 2021, defeating Maine 64–60 in the America East championship game. Stony Brook entered the conference tournament as the two seed, upsetting Maine who was the one seed. The two teams were supposed to meet in the 2020 America East championship game, with Stony Brook as the one seed and Maine as the two seed, but the game was cancelled due to the COVID-19 pandemic. Stony Brook was 28–3 that season and was named America East champions as the highest seed remaining in the tournament.

In the 2021 NCAA Division I women's basketball tournament, Stony Brook was a 14 seed and faced 3-seed Arizona in the first round. Stony Brook lost 79–44. Head coach Caroline McCombs left to become the head coach of George Washington after the season ended.

== Schedule and results ==
Date time, TV	Rank^{#}	Opponent^{#}	Result	Record	Site (attendance) city, state
Exhibition
November 5, 2021*; 7:00 p.m.		Adelphi	W 80–33		Island Federal Credit Union Arena; Stony Brook, NY
Non-conference regular season
November 9, 2021*; 7:00 p.m., ESPN+		Delaware State	W 87–46	1–0	Island Federal Credit Union Arena (627); Stony Brook, NY
November 12, 2021*; 2:00 p.m., ESPN+		at Longwood	W 82–63	2–0	Willett Hall; Farmville, VA
November 14, 2021*; 2:00 p.m., ESPN3		St. John's	W 72–60	3–0	Island Federal Credit Union Arena (1,075); Stony Brook, NY
November 16, 2021*; 11:00 am, BTN+		at Rutgers	W 53–44	4–0	Jersey Mike's Arena (218); Piscataway, NJ
November 20, 2021*; 1:00 p.m., ESPN3		at Iona	W 53–46	5–0	Hynes Athletic Center (283); New Rochelle, NY
November 24, 2021*; 1:00 p.m., ESPN+		at Columbia	W 91–82	6–0	Levien Gymnasium (373); New York, NY
November 28, 2021*; 2:00 p.m., ESPN+		St. Francis Brooklyn	W 71–64	7–0	Island Federal Credit Union Arena (643); Stony Brook, NY
December 2, 2021*; 7:00 p.m., ESPN+		at Fordham	L 59–71	7–1	Rose Hill Gymnasium (229); The Bronx, NY
December 7, 2021*; 7:00 p.m., SNY		Marist	Canceled		Island Federal Credit Union Arena; Stony Brook, NY
December 10, 2021*; 7:00 p.m., SNY		Penn	W 75–69	8–1	Island Federal Credit Union Arena (833); Stony Brook, NY
December 19, 2021*; 2:00 p.m., ESPN+		Washington State	W 69–62	9–1	Island Federal Credit Union Arena (253); Stony Brook, NY
December 21, 2021*; 2:00 p.m., FloSports		at Hofstra	Canceled		Mack Sports Complex; Hempstead, NY
America East regular season
December 30, 2021; 2:00 p.m., ESPN+		at NJIT	L 49–54	9–2 (0–1)	Wellness and Events Center (146); Newark, NJ
January 2, 2022; 2:00 p.m., ESPN+		Hartford	W 77–39	10–2 (1–1)	Island Federal Credit Union Arena (616); Stony Brook, NY
January 9, 2021; 1:00 p.m., ESPN+		at Maine	W 63–44	11–2 (2–1)	Cross Insurance Center (960); Bangor, ME
January 12, 2022; 7:00 p.m., ESPN+		Vermont	W 65–59	12–2 (3–1)	Island Federal Credit Union Arena (554); Stony Brook, NY
January 16, 2022; 1:00 p.m., ESPN+		at New Hampshire	W 71–53	13–2 (4–1)	Lundholm Gym (289); Durham, NH
January 19, 2022; 7:00 p.m., SNY		Binghamton	W 69–44	14–2 (5–1)	Island Federal Credit Union Arena (710); Stony Brook, NY
January 22, 2022; 2:00 p.m., ESPN3		Albany	W 58–47	15–2 (6–1)	Island Federal Credit Union Arena (668); Stony Brook, NY
January 26, 2022; 6:00 p.m., ESPN+		at Vermont	W 71–63	16–2 (7–1)	Patrick Gym (400); Burlington, VT
January 28, 2022; 3:00 p.m., ESPN3		New Hampshire	W 73–60	17–2 (8–1)	Island Federal Credit Union Arena (301); Stony Brook, NY
February 2, 2022; 7:00 p.m., ESPN+		at Binghamton	W 49–48	18–2 (9–1)	Binghamton University Events Center (1,028); Vestal, NY
February 5, 2022; 2:00 p.m., SNY		NJIT	W 76–38	19–2 (10–1)	Island Federal Credit Union Arena (1,140); Stony Brook, NY
February 9, 2022; 7:00 p.m., ESPN+		at UMass Lowell	W 69–65	20–2 (11–1)	Costello Athletic Center (274); Lowell, MA
February 12, 2022; 2:00 p.m., SNY		Maine	L 55–61	20–3 (11–2)	Island Federal Credit Union Arena (752); Stony Brook, NY
February 14, 2022; 5:00 p.m., ESPN+		at UMBC; Rescheduled from January 5	W 64–48	21–3 (12–2)	Chesapeake Employers Insurance Arena (200); Catonsville, MD
February 16, 2022; 7:00 p.m., SNY		UMBC	W 66–56	22–3 (13–2)	Island Federal Credit Union Arena (607); Stony Brook, NY
February 19, 2022; 2:00 p.m., ESPN3		at Hartford	W 95–69	23–3 (14–2)	Chase Arena at Reich Family Pavilion (221); West Hartford, CT
February 23, 2022; 7:00 p.m., SNY		UMass Lowell	L 68–70	23–4 (14–3)	Island Federal Credit Union Arena (860); Stony Brook, NY
February 26, 2022; 4:00 p.m., SNY		at Albany	L 56–57	23–5 (14–4)	SEFCU Arena (1,058); Albany, NY
WNIT
March 18, 2022; 6:00 p.m., ESPN3		at VCU; First round	L 48–56	23–6	Siegel Center (300); Richmond, VA
*Non-conference game. ^{#}Rankings from AP poll. (#) Tournament seedings in parentheses. All times are in Eastern.

== See also ==
- 2021–22 Stony Brook Seawolves men's basketball team
