= 2023 America East women's basketball tournament =

American college basketball postseason tournament

- Classification: Division I
- Season: 2022–23
- Teams: 8
- Site: Campus sites
- Champions: Vermont (7th title)
- Winning coach: Alisa Kresge (1st title)
- MVP: Emma Utterback (Vermont)
- Television: ESPN+, ESPNU
- America East women's basketball tournaments

The 2023 America East Women's Basketball Conference tournament was the postseason men's basketball tournament for the America East Conference that began on March 1, 2023, and ended on March 10, 2023. All tournament games were played on the home arenas of the higher-seeded school. By defeating the Albany Great Danes in the championship game, the Vermont Catamounts earned the conference's automatic bid to the 2023 NCAA Tournament

2022–23 America East Conference women's basketball standings
	Conf.				Overall
Team	W		L	PCT	W		L	PCT
Vermont†	14	–	2	.875	25	–	7	.781
Albany	14	–	2	.875	22	–	12	.647
Maine	11	–	5	.688	16	–	14	.533
UMBC	10	–	6	.625	14	–	15	.483
NJIT	8	–	8	.500	13	–	16	.448
Binghamton	6	–	10	.375	13	–	17	.433
UMass Lowell	4	–	12	.250	5	–	22	.185
Bryant	3	–	13	.188	9	–	21	.300
New Hampshire	2	–	14	.125	7	–	21	.250
† 2023 AmEast Tournament winner As of March 17, 2023

== Seeds ==
Eight of the nine America East teams will contest the tournament.

Tiebrekers will be applied as needed to determine seeding.

Seed	School	AEC Record	Tiebreaker 1	Tiebreaker 2
1	Vermont	14–2	1–1 vs. Albany	2–0 vs. Maine
2	Albany	14–2	1–1 vs. Vermont	1–1 vs. Maine
3	Maine	11–5		
4	UMBC	10–6		
5	NJIT	8-8		
6	Binghamton	6–10		
7	UMass Lowell	4–12		
8	Bryant	3–13		
9 (DNQ)	New Hampshire	2–14		

== Schedule ==
Game	Time*	Matchup^{#}	Score	Television
Quarterfinals – Wednesday, March 1, 2023
1	5:00PM	No. 8 Bryant at No. 1 Vermont	49-56	ESPN+
2	7:00 PM	No. 7 UMass Lowell at No. 2 Albany	51-59	ESPN+
3	7:00 pm	No. 5 NJIT at No. 4 UMBC	71-82	ESPN+
4	8:00 pm	No. 6 Binghamton at No. 3 Maine	54-64	ESPN+
Semifinals – Sunday, March 5
5	1:00 pm	No. 4 UMBC at No. 1 Vermont	63-75	ESPN+
6	3:00 pm	No. 3 Maine at No. 2 Albany	64-72	ESPN+
Championship – Friday, March 10, 2023
7	5:00 pm	No. 2 Albany at No. 1 Vermont	36-38	ESPNU
*Game times in EST. #-Rankings denote tournament seeding.

== Bracket ==
Quarterfinals; Wednesday, March 1, 2023; ESPN+
1	Vermont	56
8	Bryant	49
4	UMBC	82
5	NJIT	71
(Pairings are reseeded after the first round)
3	Maine	64
6	Binghamton	54
2	Albany	59
7	UMass Lowell	51

Semifinals; Sunday, March 5, 2023; ESPN+
1	Vermont	75
4	UMBC	63
3	Maine	64
2	Albany	72

Championship; Friday, March 10, 2023; ESPNU
1	Vermont	38
2	Albany	36

== See also ==
- 2023 America East men's basketball tournament
- America East Conference women's basketball tournament
