= Cindy A. Johnson =

American basketball player

Cindy Johnson
Personal information
- Listed height: 5 ft 10 in (1.78 m)

Career information
- High school: August Martin (Queens, New York)
- College: Delaware (1997–2001)
- Position: Guard

Career highlights
- 2× First-team All-AEC (2000, 2001); AEC Tournament MOP (2001); AEC All-Freshman Team (1998)

Cindy A. Johnson is a professional basketball player who has played for the University of Delaware and several European teams, as well as Guyana's national team.

She played for the University of Delaware from 1997 to 2001, and was inducted into the UD hall of fame in 2008. In the 2000–01 season, with Johnson on the team, Delaware won the America East title and advanced to the NCAA Tournament, which UD had not previously achieved. She was the UD Outstanding Female Athlete of the Year for 2001. She won all-league honors in three of the four seasons she played for UD.

As of 2008, she resided in Salt Lake City, Utah.

== Delaware statistics ==
Legend
GP	Games played	GS	Games started	MPG	Minutes per game
FG%	Field goal percentage	3P%	3-point field goal percentage	FT%	Free throw percentage
RPG	Rebounds per game	APG	Assists per game	SPG	Steals per game
BPG	Blocks per game	PPG	Points per game	**Bold**	Career high

Year	Team	GP	Points	FG%	3P%	FT%	RPG	APG	SPG	BPG	PPG
1997–98	Delaware	27	285	39.3%	**26.9%**	**79.4%**	4.4	2.0	1.4	0.1	10.6
1998–99	Delaware	27	368	41.5%	25.0%	63.6%	4.8	2.4	1.3	0.1	13.6
1999–2000	Delaware	29	502	**44.8%**	13.3%	69.1%	**5.5**	2.5	**1.9**	0.2	**17.3**
2000–01	Delaware	**30**	**520**	42.8%	26.7%	75.1%	4.5	**2.5**	1.8	**0.2**	17.3
Career		113	1675	42.4%	92.0%	18.8%	3.5	2.3	1.6	0.2	14.8

== Pro Experience ==
- 2006 – Washington Mystics (WNBA) Free Agent Camp- Invited by Washington Mystics to Free Agent Camp
- 2003 – Ibiza, SPA
- 2002 – Grindavik; Grindavik Iceland signed as replacement on 21 January 2002. Averaged: 22.3 points, .385 3pt %, 2.3 steals, 7.3 rebs per game
- 2001 – Burgos; SPA
- 2001 – WNBA Pre-Draft Camp Participant
- 2000 – Caricom Championships (Barbados)- captain of Guyana Women's National Team. Averaged: 26.3 points, 4 steals, 6 rebs per game
- 1998 – Caricom Championships (Belize)-co-captain of Guyana Women's National Team. Averaged: 15.5 points, 3 steals, 5.4 rebs per game
- 1997 – Caricom Junior Nationals Championships (Jamaica)-Captain. Averaged: 20.1 points, 3 steals, 3.4 Assists, 6.2 rebs per game
- 1997 – Centro American Basketball Championships (Honduras). Averaged: 11.3 points, 5 Assists, 8 rebs per game.
