= Trina Patterson =

American basketball player and coach

Current position
- Title: Head coach
- Team: UNC Greensboro
- Conference: Southern
- Record: 146–129 (.531)

Biographical details
- Education: University of Virginia (1987); National University (2002)

Playing career
- 1983–1987: Virginia

Coaching career (HC unless noted)
- 1991–1999: William & Mary
- 1999–2000: Maryland Eastern Shore
- 2002–2010: Albany
- 2011–2013: Stanford (assistant)
- 2013–2016: Old Dominion (assistant HC)
- 2016–present: UNC Greensboro

Head coaching record
- Overall: 329–429 (.434)

Accomplishments and honors

Awards
- CAA Coach of the Year (1994); America East Coach of the Year (2008); 3× Southern Coach of the Year (2017, 2020, 2025)

Trina Patterson is an American basketball coach and former player who is the current head coach of the UNC Greensboro Spartans women's basketball team.

== Coaching career ==
=== Stanford & Old Dominion ===
On May 26, 2011, Patterson was hired as an assistant coach on Tara VanDerveer's staff at Stanford University.

After two seasons at Stanford, Patterson was named assistant head coach for the Old Dominion Monarchs women's basketball team in June 2013.

=== UNC Greensboro ===
On April 17, 2016, Patterson was hired as the seventh head coach in University of North Carolina at Greensboro program history.
