= New Hampshire Wildcats women's basketball =

2026–27 New Hampshire Wildcats women's basketball team
- University: University of New Hampshire
- Head coach: Megan Shoniker (3rd season)
- Location: Durham, New Hampshire
- Arena: Lundholm Gym (capacity: 3,500)
- Conference: America East
- Nickname: Wildcats
- Colors: Blue, gray, and white

Conference tournament champions
- 1983, 1984

Conference regular-season champions
- 1985, 2017

Uniforms
Home	Away

The New Hampshire Wildcats women's basketball is the basketball team that represents the University of New Hampshire in Durham, New Hampshire. The school's team currently competes in the America East Conference and they play their home games at Lundholm Gym.

== History ==
The Wildcats in their history have won back-to-back Eastern College Athletic Conference conference titles in 1983 and 1984 but they were not invited to the NCAA tournament. The Wildcats have never won the America East Conference Tournament, but they have made the semifinals in 2013, 2014, and 2017. They won the regular season title in the latter year, which earned them a bid to the 2017 Women's National Invitation Tournament, their first ever postseason appearance. They lost 69–56 to Hartford in the first round.

== Season-by-season record ==
Season	Coach	Overall	Conference	Standing	Postseason
New Hampshire Wildcats women's basketball (New England Collegiate Conference (Division II)) (1981–1987)
1981–82	Nancy Anne Rowe	5–13	–		
1982–83	Nancy Anne Rowe	15–11	2–4		
1983–84	Nancy Anne Rowe	10–18	4–11		
1984–85	Nancy Anne Rowe	20–9	9–5		
1985–86	Nancy Anne Rowe	17–13	7–5		
1986–87	Nancy Anne Rowe	19–9	11–3		
Nancy Anne Rowe:		86–73 (.541)	33–28 (.541)		
New Hampshire Wildcats women's basketball (Seaboard Conference) (1987–1997)
1987–88	Kathy Sanborn	19–8	11–3	3rd	
1988–89	Kathy Sanborn	16–11	10–4	2nd	
Kathy Sanborn:		35–19 (.648)	21–7 (.750)		
(North Atlantic Conference) (1989–1995)
1989–90	Kathy Sanborn	11–16	7–5	3rd	
1990–91	Kathy Sanborn	10–17	3–7	5th	
1991–92	Kathy Sanborn	18–8	9–4	3rd	
1992–93	Kathy Sanborn	18–8	10–4	2nd	
1993–94	Kathy Sanborn	17–11	8–6	4th	
1994–95	Kathy Sanborn	13–14	10–6	3rd	
Kathy Sanborn:		87–74 (.540)	47–32 (.595)		
(America East Conference) (1995–1997)
1995–96	Kathy Sanborn	16–12	12–6	3rd	
1996–97	Kathy Sanborn	18–10	14–4	3rd	
Kathy Sanborn:		278–208 (.572)	162–88 (.648)		
New Hampshire Wildcats women's basketball (America East Conference) (1997–2007)
1997–98	Sue Johnson	12–15	9–9	6th	
1998–99	Sue Johnson	19–8	13–5	T-2nd	
1999–00	Sue Johnson	13–15	8–10	6th	
2000–01	Sue Johnson	10–18	8–10	T-4th	
2001–02	Sue Johnson	16–13	9–7	T-5th	
2002–03	Sue Johnson	13–16	7–9	T-4th	
2003–04	Sue Johnson	11–18	6–12	8th	
2004–05	Sue Johnson	15–14	10–8	3rd	
2005–06	Sue Johnson	15–13	7–9	T-5th	
2006–07	Sue Johnson	9–20	4–12	T-8th	
Sue Johnson:		133–150 (.470)	81–91 (.471)		
Kristen Cole (America East) (2007–2010)
2007–08	Kristen Cole	7–22	4–12	7th	
2008–09	Kristen Cole	8–23	6–10	T-5th	
2009–10	Kristen Cole	9–22	3–13	9th	
Kristen Cole:		24–67	13–35		
Maureen Magarity (America East) (2010–2020)
2010–11	Maureen Magarity	9–20	6–10	6th	
2011–12	Maureen Magarity	16–14	9–7	4th	WBI First Round
2012–13	Maureen Magarity	12–18	6–10	5th	
2013–14	Maureen Magarity	19–12	12–4	3rd	
2014–15	Maureen Magarity	17–12	9–5	4th	
2015–16	Maureen Magarity	12–18	6–10	7th	
2016–17	Maureen Magarity	26–6	15–1	1st	WNIT First Round
2017–18	Maureen Magarity	19–12	9–7	5th	
2018–19	Maureen Magarity	6–24	3–13	T-7th	
2019–20	Maureen Magarity	10–19	7–9	5th	
Maureen Magarity:		146–155	82–76		
Kelsey Hogan (America East) (2020–present)
2020–21	Kelsey Hogan	5–15	5–11	6th	
Kelsey Hogan:		5–15	5–11		
Total:		672–668			
National champion Postseason invitational champion Conference regular season champion Conference regular season and conference tournament champion Division regular season champion Division regular season and conference tournament champion Conference tournament champion

== Postseason ==
=== WNIT results ===
Year	Round	Opponent	Result
2017	First Round	Harvard	L 56–69

=== WBI results ===
Year	Round	Opponent	Result
2012	First Round	Holy Cross	L 59–63
