= UMBC Retrievers women's basketball =

American collegiate basketball team

UMBC Retrievers
2026–27 UMBC Retrievers women's basketball team
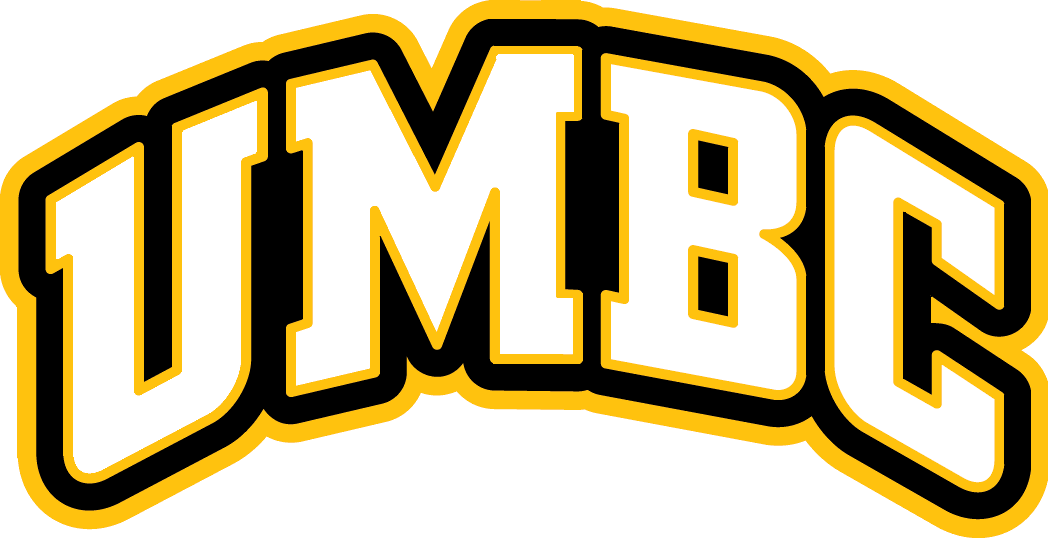
- University: University of Maryland, Baltimore County
- Head coach: Candice Hill (3rd season)
- Location: Catonsville, Maryland
- Arena: Chesapeake Employers Insurance Arena (capacity: 5,000)
- Conference: America East
- Nickname: Retrievers
- Colors: Black and gold
- Student section: Retriever Rowdies

NCAA Division I tournament appearances
- 2007

Conference tournament champions
- 2007

Conference regular-season champions
- 2011

Uniforms
Home	Away

The UMBC Retrievers women's basketball is the team who represents the University of Maryland, Baltimore County in National Collegiate Athletic Association (NCAA) Division I playing competition as a member of the America East Conference.

== History ==
Since beginning play in 1968, the Retrievers have an all-time record of 496–695, as of the end of the 2015–16 season.

In 2007, UMBC won the conference title for the first time, beating Hartford 48–46 to clinch their first ever title and first ever tournament berth. In the first round of the NCAA Tournament, they lost to Connecticut 82–33. They won the regular season title in 2011, but they wound up in the WNIT after losing in the America East Tournament. They lost 59–47 to Florida in the first round.

== NCAA tournament results ==
Year	Seed	Round	Opponent	Result
2007	#16	First Round	#1 Connecticut	L 33–82
