= 2012 Women's Basketball Invitational =

American women's college basketball tournament

- Teams: 16
- Champions: Minnesota

The 2012 Women's Basketball Invitational (WBI) was a single-elimination tournament of 16 National Collegiate Athletic Association (NCAA) Division I teams that did not participate in the 2012 NCAA Division I women's basketball tournament or 2012 Women's National Invitation Tournament. The 2012 bracket was announced on March 13, 2012. All games were hosted by the higher seed throughout the tournament, unless the higher seed's arena was unavailable. The championship game was hosted by the school with the higher end of the season RPI. The tournament was won by the Minnesota Golden Gophers.

== 2012 Teams ==
Seattle will be making its first division I postseason appearance, SIU Edwardsville will host its first ever division I postseason game.

== West Region ==
1st Round; March 14, 15, 16
1 | Seattle | 61
8 | North Dakota | 47
4 | SIU-Edwardsville | 64
5 | Wright State | 73
2 | Stephen F. Austin | 67
7 | Northern Iowa | 83
3 | Sam Houston State | 77
6 | Rice | 55

Quarterfinals; March 17, 18
1 | Seattle | 82
5 | Wright State | 65
7 | Northern Iowa | 78
3 | Sam Houston State | 69

Semi-finals; March 21
1 | Seattle | 64
7 | Northern Iowa | 68

== East Region ==
#8 Manhattan will host a first round game

1st Round; March 14, 15, 16
1 | Robert Morris | 54
8 | Manhattan | 77
4 | Holy Cross | 63
5 | New Hampshire | 59
2 | Minnesota | 80
7 | Charleston Southern | 51
3 | Bradley | 74
6 | Tennessee Tech | 71

Quarterfinals; March 17, 18
8 | Manhattan | 78
4 | Holy Cross | 63
2 | Minnesota | 85
3 | Bradley | 59

Semi-finals; March 23
8 | Manhattan | 54
2 | Minnesota | 67

== WBI Championship Game ==
| Championship game March 25 |
| 7 | Northern Iowa | 74 |
| 2 | Minnesota | 88 |

== See also ==
- 2012 NCAA Men's Division I Basketball Tournament
- 2012 NCAA Women's Division I Basketball Tournament
- NCAA Women's Division I Tournament bids by school
- 2012 Women's National Invitation Tournament
