= Albany Great Danes women's basketball =

Albany Great Danes
2026–27 Albany Great Danes women's basketball team
- University: University at Albany, SUNY
- First season: 1964–65
- Head coach: Kelly Morrone (1st season)
- Location: Albany, New York
- Arena: Broadview Center (capacity: 4,553)
- Conference: America East
- Nickname: Great Danes
- Colors: Purple and gold
- All-time record: 661–605 (.522)

NCAA Division I tournament Elite Eight
- Division III: 1986
Other NCAA Division I tournament results
Sweet Sixteen	Division III: 1986, 1992
Appearances	Division III: 1986, 1992; Division I: 2012, 2013, 2014, 2015, 2016, 2017, 2022

Conference tournament champions
- 2012, 2013, 2014, 2015, 2016, 2017, 2022

Conference regular-season champions
- 2013, 2014, 2015, 2016, 2023, 2025

Uniforms
Home	Away

The Albany Great Danes women's basketball team is the basketball team that represents the University at Albany, SUNY in Albany, New York. The school's team currently competes in the America East Conference and plays its home games at SEFCU Arena.

== History ==
UAlbany Women's Basketball had little success on the court since it started play in 1964–65. Its greatest success took place in 1985–86, when it went 26–4 and made it to the third round of the NCAA Division III Tournament. Coach Mari Warner led the program into Division I play in 1999–00, but again success was limited. Through the 2000s under new coach Trina Patterson, winning was also limited. However, things began to change in 2010–11 under former head coach Katie Abrahamson-Henderson. That season, UA finished over .500 for the first time since 1997–98. Abrahamson-Henderson led UAlbany to its then-best record in Division I history in the 2011–12 season, going 23–10 overall. The Great Danes brought home their first-ever America East Conference title, and represented the league in the NCAA Tournament. UAlbany visited defending National Champions Texas A&M, but fell 69–47.

The Great Danes dominated all conference opposition in the 2012–13 season with a 27–4 overall record, winning all games against America East opponents, including 16 regular season games and all league championship contests. UAlbany became the first team to go undefeated in the America East and win the conference since the 1995–96 season. Abrahamson-Henderson earned America East Coach of the Year honors for her efforts. Ebone Henry was named the America East Co-Player of the Year and Defensive Player of the Year. The team won their second straight title, but lost to North Carolina 59–54 in the first round.

The 2013–14 Great Danes did not lose a beat, earning a three-peat as America East champion, going 28–5 with a 15–1 conference record. The team earned the 1-seed in the America East Tournament after winning its first 15 league games. It won its third straight game, and earned a 15-seed in the NCAAs and pushed 2-seed West Virginia to the brink before falling 76–61 in the NCAA First Round.

In 2014–15, UA went 24–9 overall with a 14–2 America East record. UAlbany had a number of program firsts that season, including the first win over a Power Five program, defeating three-time reigning Big Ten regular season champion Penn State to earn a berth into the Preseason WNIT semi-finals, the first DI All-American with Shereesha Richards, and the program's highest-ever NCAA seeding at 13, battling Duke to the end and leading in the final minute, falling to the Blue Devils 54–52.

On March 11, 2016, the Great Danes won their conference record-breaking fifth straight title. They defeated Maine 59–58, with whom they shared the co-regular season title in back-to-back years. Both teams split their regular season match-up.

Two players had their numbers retired once their time was over at UAlbany: Ebone Henry and Julie Foster. In 2012–13, Henry was named the America East Co-Player of the Year and Defensive Player of the Year, with 13.8 points, 5.1 rebounds and 2.8 steals per game. She also won three straight Defensive Player of the Year awards and three First Team All-Conference.

Shereesha Richards was also critical in the fuve straight titles for UAlbany. She won three America East Player of the Year awards, along with a Co-Rookie of the Year Award. She finished as the All-Time scorer in UAlbany Basketball history (men's and women's program) with 2,440 points, and became the first DI All-American in Great Danes history. She finished her career with over 2,000 points and 1,000 rebounds.

Sources:

- Albany Media Guide
- America East Media
- America East standings

Record table
Season	Coach	Overall	Conference	Standing	Postseason
Claudette Delamater () (1964–1965)
1964–65	Claudette Delamater	7–6			
Claudette Delamater:		7–6 (.538)			
Leonia Rhenish () (1965–1967)
1965–66	Leonia Rhenish	3–6			
1966–67	Leonia Rhenish	0–10			
Leonia Rhenish:		3–16 (.158)			
Barbara Jordan () (1967–1976)
1967–68	Barbara Jordan	7–6			
1968–69	Barbara Jordan	3–5			
1969–70	Barbara Palm	6–3			
1970–71	Barbara Palm	7–5			
1971–72	Barbara Palm	5–5			
NCAA Division III
1972–73	Barbara Palm	4–6			
1973–74	Barbara Palm	5–4			
1974–75	Barbara Palm	3–9			
1975–76	Barbara Palm	2–11			
Barbara Palm:		42–54 (.438)			
Karen Cunningham () (1976–1977)
1976–77	Karen Cunningham	1–13			
Karen Cunningham:		1–13 (.071)			
() (–present)
1977–78	Johnetta Hill	2–12			
1978–79	Johnetta Hill	0–12			
Johnetta Hill:		2–24 (.077)			
Amy Kidder () (1979–1982)
1979–80	Amy Kidder	6–14			
1980–81	Amy Kidder	7–14			
1981–82	Amy Kidder	8–12			
Amy Kidder:		21–40 (.344)			
Mari Warner () (1982–2002)
1982–83	Mari Warner	14–6			
1983–84	Mari Warner	15–10			
1984–85	Mari Warner	23–4			
1985–86	Mari Warner	26–4			
1986–87	Mari Warner	19–5			
1987–88	Mari Warner	17–7			
1988–89	Mari Warner	15–9			
1990–91	Mari Warner	13–12			
1989–90	Mari Warner	10–14			
1991–92	Mari Warner	22–5			
1992–93	Mari Warner	14–9			
1993–94	Mari Warner	15–9			
1994–95	Mari Warner	16–9			
NCAA Division II
1995–96	Mari Warner	13–14	10–10		
1996–97	Mari Warner	19–9	12–6		
1997–98	Mari Warner	14–13	9–7		
1998–99	Mari Warner	13–14	9–9		
NCAA Division I
1999–00	Mari Warner	12–15			
2000–01	Mari Warner	5–22			
America East Conference
2001–02	Mari Warner	4–23	0–16	9th	
Mari Warner:		299–213 (.584)			
Trina Patterson (America East Conference) (2002–2010)
2002–03	Trina Patterson	9–18	3–13	9th	
2003–04	Trina Patterson	13–16	9–9	T-4th	
2004–05	Trina Patterson	14–14	9–9	T-4th	
2005–06	Trina Patterson	7–21	3–13	9th	
2006–07	Trina Patterson	9–22	4–12	T-8th	
2007–08	Trina Patterson	13–18	10–6	4th	
2008–09	Trina Patterson	6–25	3–13	T-8th	
2009–10	Trina Patterson	11–19	4–12	T-7th	
Trina Patterson:		82–153 (.349)	45–87 (.341)		
Katie Abrahamson-Henderson (America East Conference) (2010–2016)
2010–11	Katie Abrahamson-Henderson	16–14	9–7	5th	
2011–12	Katie Abrahamson-Henderson	23–10	14–2	2nd	NCAA First round
2012–13	Katie Abrahamson-Henderson	27–4	16–0	1st	NCAA First round
2013–14	Katie Abrahamson-Henderson	28–5	15–1	1st	NCAA First round
2014–15	Katie Abrahamson-Henderson	24–9	14–2	T-1st	NCAA First round
2015–16	Katie Abrahamson-Henderson	28–5	15–1	T-1st	NCAA Second round
Katie Abrahamson-Henderson:		146–47 (.756)	83–13 (.865)		
Joanna Bernabei-McNamee (America East Conference) (2016–2018)
2016–17	Joanna Bernabei-McNamee	21–12	12–4	2nd	NCAA First round
2017–18	Joanna Bernabei-McNamee	24–9	12–4	2nd	WNIT First round
Joanna Bernabei-McNamee:		45–21 (.682)	24–8 (.750)		
Colleen Mullen (America East Conference) (2018–present)
2018–19	Colleen Mullen	13–18	9–7	4th	
2019–20	Colleen Mullen	9–21	5–11	8th	
2020–21	Colleen Mullen	7–11	5–7	4th	
2021–22	Colleen Mullen	23–9	13–5	2nd	NCAA First round
2022–23	Colleen Mullen	22–12	12–2	T-1st	WNIT First round
2023–24	Colleen Mullen	25-7	13-3	2nd	WNIT First round
2024–25	Colleen Mullen	26-7	14-2	1st	WBIT First round
Colleen Mullen:		125–85 (.595)	71–37 (.657)		
Total:		750–663 (.531)			
National champion Postseason invitational champion Conference regular season champion Conference regular season and conference tournament champion Division regular season champion Division regular season and conference tournament champion Conference tournament champion

== Postseason ==
=== NCAA Division I ===
The Great Danes have appeared in the NCAA Division I Tournament seven times. Their combined record is 1–7.

Year	Seed	Round	Opponent	Result
2012	#14	First round	#3 Texas A&M	L 47–69
2013	#14	First round	#3 North Carolina	L 54–59
2014	#15	First round	#2 West Virginia	L 61–76
2015	#13	First round	#4 Duke	L 52–54
2016	#12	First round Second round	#5 Florida #4 Syracuse	W 61–59; L 59–76
2017	#16	First round	#1 Connecticut	L 55–116
2022	#16	First round	#1 Louisville	L 51–83

=== WNIT ===
The Great Danes appeared in the Women's National Invitation Tournament twice, with a combined record of 0– 2.

Year	Round	Opponent	Result
2018	Round 1	Penn	L 76–61
2023	Round 1	UMass	L 73–48

=== NCAA Division III ===
The Great Danes appeared in the NCAA Division III Tournament two times, with a combined record of 3–2.

Year	Round	Opponent	Result
1986	Regionals; Regional Finals; Elite Eight	Columbia (SC); NYU; Salem State	W, 74–67; W, 68–66; L, 79–90
1992	Regionals; Regional Finals	William Smith; Eastern Connecticut State	W, 67–50; L, 57–69
