= Lundholm Gym =

Sports venue in Durham, New Hampshire, United States

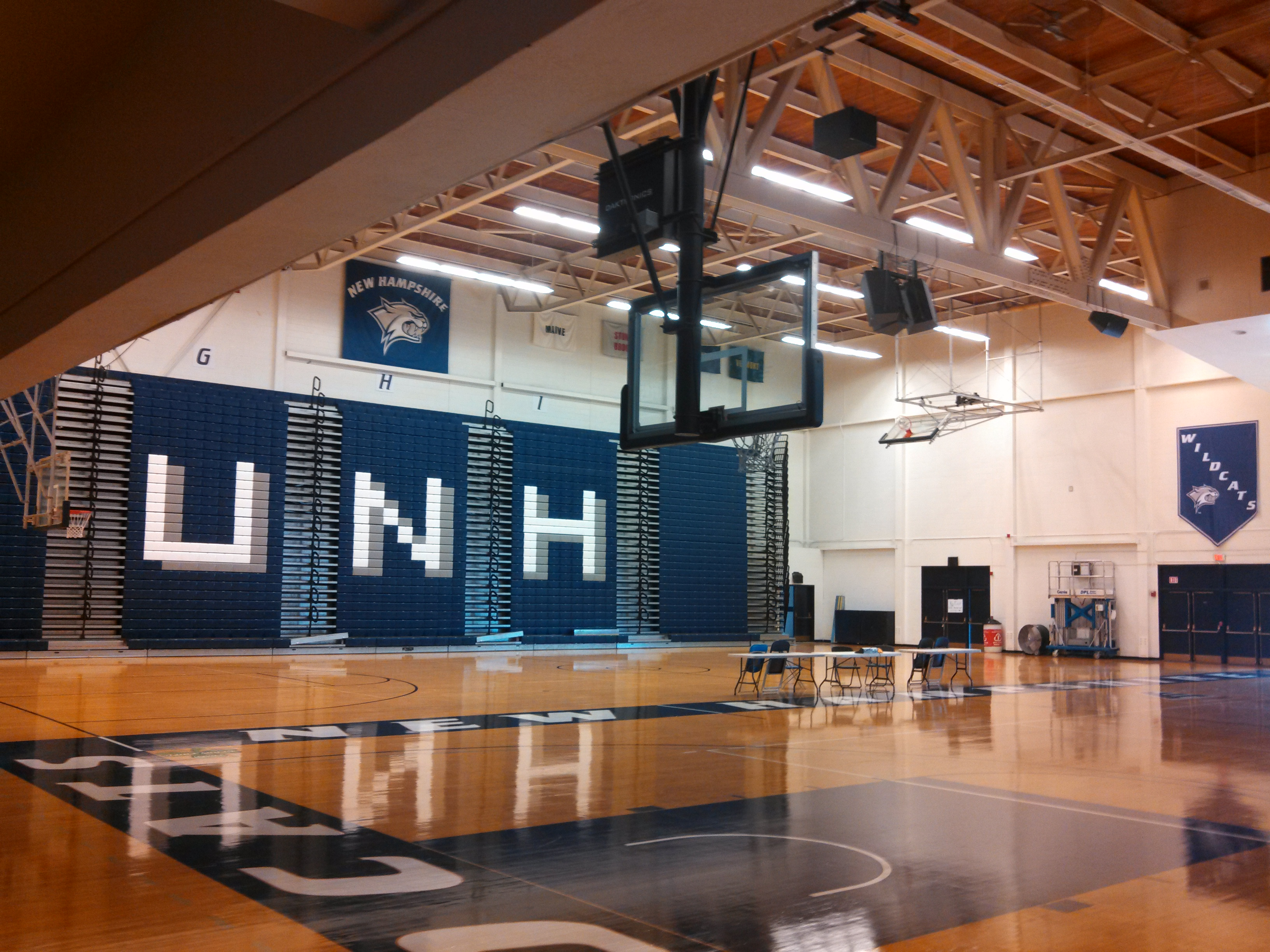
- Interactive map of Lundholm Gym
- Address: 145 Main St, Durham, NH 03824
- Coordinates: 43°08′19″N 70°56′17″W
- Operator: University of New Hampshire
- Seating type: Bleachers
- Capacity: 3,000
- Surface: Floorboard
- Record attendance: 2,415 (September 6, 2005, vs. Stanford)

Construction
- Renovated: Refinished floor 2001; Replaced bleachers 2007

Tenants
- New Hampshire Wildcats (NCAA); Men's basketball Women's basketball Women's volleyball Women's gymnastics

Lundholm Gym is a 3,000-seat multi-purpose arena in Durham, New Hampshire. It is home to the University of New Hampshire Wildcats athletics program, including men's and women's basketball, women's volleyball, and women's gymnastics.

Lundholm Gym is the major component of the UNH Field House, which was completed in 1938 just to the northeast of Alumni Field, as part of the new athletics area. The gymnasium was renamed on December 2, 1968, to honor Carl Lundholm, '21, athletic director at the school from 1939 to 1963.

== See also ==
- List of NCAA Division I basketball arenas
