= Vermont Catamounts women's basketball =

Vermont Catamounts
2026–27 Vermont Catamounts women's basketball team
- University: University of Vermont
- First season: 1979
- Head coach: Maureen Magarity (1st season)
- Location: Burlington, Vermont
- Arena: Patrick Gym (capacity: 3,266)
- Conference: America East
- Nickname: Catamounts
- Colors: Green and gold
- All-time record: 622–606

NCAA Division I tournament round of 32
- 2010

NCAA Division I tournament appearances
- 1992, 1993, 1994, 2000, 2009, 2010, 2023, 2025, 2026

Conference tournament champions
- 1992, 1993, 1994, 2000, 2009, 2010, 2023, 2025, 2026

Conference regular-season champions
- 1992, 1993, 1998, 2000, 2002, 2023, 2026

Uniforms
Home	Away

The Vermont Catamounts women's basketball team is the basketball team that represents the University of Vermont in Burlington, Vermont. The school's team currently competes in the America East Conference and plays its home games at Patrick Gym.

== History ==
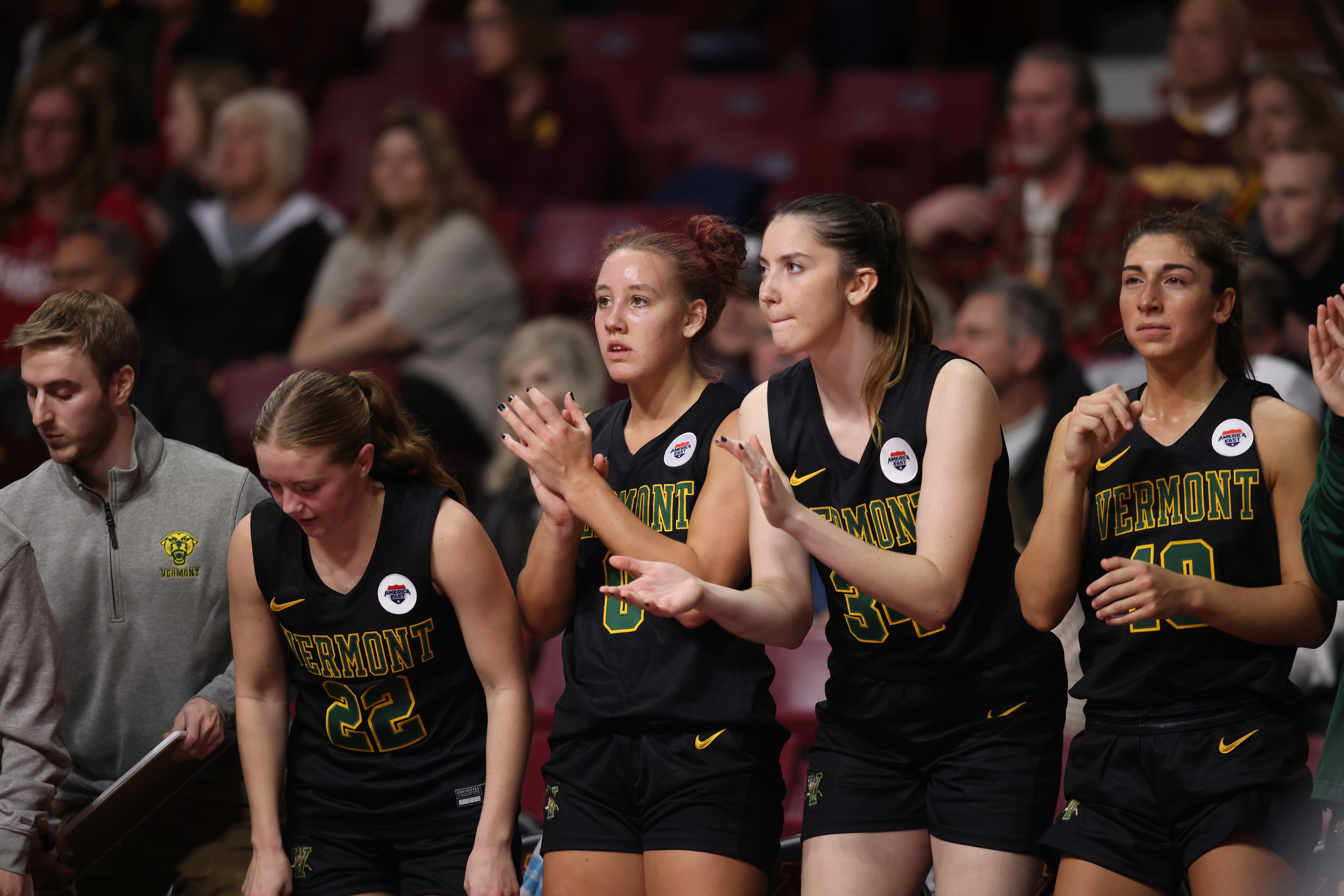
Vermont Catamounts women's basketball team in 2024

The Catamounts went undefeated in the regular season in back-to-back seasons in the 1991–92 and 1992–93 seasons, the first time a women's basketball program did that in the NCAA era. Only Connecticut has done that feat since Vermont did it. They have won the conference title six times, second only to Maine.

Season	Record	Conference Record	Postseason finish	Coach
1979–80	3–13	n/a	n/a	Jean Condon
1980–81	5–15	n/a	n/a	Jean Condon
1981–82	6–17	n/a	n/a	Jean Condon
1982–83	4–20	n/a	n/a	Jean Condon
1983–84	6–20	n/a	n/a	Robyn Markey
1984–85	11–14	1–4 (3rd North Atlantic Conference)	n/a	Robyn Markey
1985–86	8–16	4–8 (4th North Atlantic Conference)	n/a	Robyn Markey
1986–87	13–14	6–8 (4th North Atlantic Conference)	n/a	Cathy Inglese
1987–88	8–18	4–10 (T-5th North Atlantic Conference)	n/a	Cathy Inglese
1988–89	7–18	5–9 (6th North Atlantic Conference)	n/a	Cathy Inglese
1989–90	13–5	6–6 (4th North Atlantic Conference)	n/a	Cathy Inglese
1990–91	22–7	8–2 (2nd North Atlantic Conference)	North Atlantic Conference Finals	Cathy Inglese
1991–92	29–1	14–0 (1st North Atlantic Conference)	North Atlantic Conference Champions; NCAA First Round	Cathy Inglese
1992–93	28–1	14–0 (1st North Atlantic Conference)	North Atlantic Conference Champions; NCAA First Round	Cathy Inglese
1993–94	19–11	9–5 (3rd North Atlantic Conference)	North Atlantic Conference Champions; NCAA First Round	Pam Borton
1994–95	11–16	9–7 (5th North Atlantic Conference)	North Atlantic Conference Quarterfinals	Pam Borton
1995–96	18–11	13–5 (2nd North Atlantic Conference)	North Atlantic Conference Finals	Pam Borton
1996–97	21–8	14–4 (T-2nd America East)	America East Finals	Pam Borton
1997–98	22–7	15–3 (1st America East)	America East Finals	Keith Cieplicki
1998–99	17–12	11–7 (3rd America East)	America East Semifinals	Keith Cieplicki
1999-00	25–6	15–3 (1st America East)	America East Champions; NCAA First Round	Keith Cieplicki
2000–01	19–11	13–5 (T-2nd America East)	America East Finals	Keith Cieplicki
2001–02	23–9	14–2 (1st America East)	America East Semifinals; WNIT Quarterfinals	Keith Cieplicki
2002–03	21–8	12–4 (2nd America East)	America East Semifinals	Keith Cieplicki
2003–04	14–13	8–10 (6th America East)	America East Quarterfinals	Sharon Dawley
2004–05	14–15	9–9 (4th America East)	America East Semifinals	Sharon Dawley
2005–06	9–18	5–11 (7th America East)	America East Quarterfinals	Sharon Dawley
2006–07	19–12	8–8 (3rd America East)	America East Semifinals	Sharon Dawley
2007–08	24–9	13–3 (2nd America East)	America East Semifinals; WNIT Second Round	Sharon Dawley
2008–09	21–12	12–4 (3rd America East)	America East Champions; NCAA First Round	Sharon Dawley
2009–10	27–7	13–3 (2nd America East)	America East Champions; NCAA Second Round	Sharon Dawley
2010–11	5–25	5–11 (7th America East)	America East Quarterfinals	Lori Gear McBride
2011–12	10–20	4–12 (7th America East)	America East Quarterfinals	Lori Gear McBride
2012–13	10–21	6–10 (T-4th America East)	America East Semifinals	Lori Gear McBride
2013–14	7–23	4–10 (6th America East)	America East Quarterfinals	Lori Gear McBride
2014–15	5–24	2–14 (7th America East)	America East Quarterfinals	Lori Gear McBride
2015–16	9–21	4–12 (8th America East)	America East Quarterfinals	Lori Gear McBride
2016–17	9–20	6–10 (7th America East)	America East Quarterfinals	Chris Day
2017–18	8–22	5–11 (7th America East)	America East Quarterfinals	Chris Day
2018–19	11–18	7–9 (6th America East)	America East Quarterfinals	Alisa Kresge (Interim head coach)
2019–20	12–18	6–10 (7th America East)	America East Quarterfinals	Alisa Kresge
2020–21	4–2	4–2	n/a	Alisa Kresge
2021–22	20–11	13–5 (T-3rd America East)	America East Semifinals	Alisa Kresge
2022–23	25–7	14–2 (1st America East)	America East Champions; NCAA First Round	Alisa Kresge
2023–24	25–12	12–4		

== NCAA tournament results ==
Vermont has appeared in the NCAA Division I women's basketball tournament nine times. They have a combined record of 1–9.

Year	Seed	Round	Opponent	Result
1992	#9	First Round	#8 George Washington	L 69–70
1993	#8	First Round	#9 Rutgers	L 74–80
1994	#13	First Round	#4 Seton Hall	L 60–70
2000	#11	First Round	#6 Tulane	L 60–65
2009	#16	First Round	#1 Connecticut	L 65–104
2010	#10	First Round; Second Round	#7 Wisconsin #2 Notre Dame	W 64–55; L 66–84
2023	#15	First Round	#2 Connecticut	L 52–95
2025	#15	First Round	#2 NC State	L 55–75
2026	#14	First Round	#3 Louisville	L 52–72
