= 2023–24 Saint Francis Red Flash women's basketball team =

American college basketball season

2023–24 Saint Francis Red Flash women's basketball
- Conference: Northeast Conference
- Record: 5–25 (4–12 NEC)
- Head coach: Keila Whittington (5th season)
- Assistant coaches: Zakiya Saunders; Joey Raniero; Nikolas Quezada
- Home arena: DeGol Arena

2023–24 Northeast Conference women's basketball standings
	Conf.				Overall
Team	W		L	PCT	W		L	PCT
Sacred Heart †	15	–	1	.938	24	–	10	.706
Le Moyne*	14	–	2	.875	18	–	15	.545
Fairleigh Dickinson	11	–	5	.688	14	–	17	.452
Merrimack	8	–	8	.500	12	–	19	.387
Central Connecticut	7	–	9	.438	9	–	21	.300
LIU	5	–	11	.313	8	–	22	.267
Stonehill*	4	–	12	.250	4	–	26	.133
Saint Francis	4	–	12	.250	5	–	25	.167
Wagner	4	–	12	.250	7	–	21	.250
† 2024 NEC tournament winner * ineligible for the 2024 NCAA tournament due to transition period

The 2023–24 Saint Francis Red Flash women's basketball team represented Saint Francis University during the 2023–24 NCAA Division I women's basketball season. The Red Flash, who were led by fifth-year head coach Keila Whittington, played their home games at the DeGol Arena in Loretto, Pennsylvania as members of the Northeast Conference (NEC).

== Previous season ==
The Red Flash finished the 2022–23 season 7–22, 6–10 in NEC play, to finish in sixth place. They were defeated by Merrimack in the quarterfinals of the NEC tournament.

== Roster ==
2023–24 Saint Francis Red Flash women's basketball team
Players
Coaches

Pos.	#	Name	Height	Year	Previous school	Hometown
G	0	Yanessa Boyd	5 ft 9 in (1.75 m)	Fr	Riverdale Baptist School	Frederick, MD
G	1	Kameryn Dorsey	5 ft 6 in (1.68 m)	Fr	Saint Frances Academy	Baltimore, MD
G	2	Kendall Carruthers	5 ft 7 in (1.7 m)	Fr	Springfield High School	Holland, OH
F	3	Jade Campbell	6 ft 0 in (1.83 m)	So	Medgar Evers College Prep School	Brooklyn, NY
G	4	Marissa Shelton	5 ft 8 in (1.73 m)	So	John Adams High School	South Bend, IN
G	5	Kaitlyn Maxwell	5 ft 7 in (1.7 m)	Sr	Everett High School	Everett, PA
G	11	Harris Robinson	5 ft 8 in (1.73 m)	Jr	Avonworth High School	Pittsburgh, PA
F	12	Julianna Gibson	6 ft 2 in (1.88 m)	So	Colts Neck High School	Colts Neck, NJ
G	15	Brigid Scanlon	5 ft 8 in (1.73 m)	Fr	Perkiomen School	State College, PA
F	23	Marina Artero	5 ft 11 in (1.8 m)	Fr	FC Barcelona	Fontanilles, Spain
G	24	Destini Ward	5 ft 8 in (1.73 m)	So	Western School of Technology	Baltimore, MD
F	32	Fanta Daffe	5 ft 10 in (1.78 m)	Jr	Odessa College	Paris, France
F	34	Alary Bell	6 ft 2 in (1.88 m)	Fr	The Miller School of Albemarle	Chester, Virginia

Head coach

- Keila Whittington (Dillard)

Assistant coach(es)

- Zakiya Saunders (Central Florida)
- Joey Raniero (Temple)
- Nikolas Quezada (Miami (OH))

Legend

- (C) Team captain
- (S) Suspended
- (I) Ineligible
- (W) Walk-on
- Injured
- Current redshirt

Roster
Last update: March 12, 2024

== Schedule and results ==
Date time, TV	Rank^{#}	Opponent^{#}	Result	Record	Site (attendance) city, state
Non-conference regular season
November 6, 2023*; 7:00 p.m., NEC Front Row		Robert Morris	L 50–61	0–1	DeGol Arena (392); Loretto, PA
November 11, 2023*; 1:00 p.m., ESPN+		at Canisius	L 62–78	0–2	Koessler Athletic Center (649); Buffalo, NY
November 13, 2023*; 7:00 p.m., NEC Front Row		Coppin State	L 34–70	0–3	DeGol Arena (371); Loretto, PA
November 18, 2023*; 12:00 p.m., B1G+		at Rutgers	L 51–80	0–4	Jersey Mike's Arena (1,709); Piscataway, NJ
November 22, 2023*; 2:00 p.m., ESPN+		at Loyola (MD)	L 45–53	0–5	Reitz Arena (215); Baltimore, MD
November 26, 2023*; 2:00 p.m., NEC Front Row		Lafayette	L 58–60	0–6	DeGol Arena (212); Loretto, PA
November 29, 2023*; 7:00 p.m., ACCNX		at Pittsburgh	L 62–87	0–7	Petersen Events Center (894); Pittsburgh, PA
December 2, 2023*; 2:00 p.m., NEC Front Row		Morgan State	W 69–59	1–7	DeGol Arena (269); Loretto, PA
December 9, 2023*; 4:00 p.m., NEC Front Row		Youngstown State	L 32–69	1–8	DeGol Arena (124); Loretto, PA
December 15, 2023*; 6:00 p.m., ESPN+		at NJIT	L 41–68	1–9	Wellness and Events Center (196); Newark, NJ
December 17, 2023*; 1:00 p.m., B1G+		at Penn State	L 43–119	1–10	Bryce Jordan Center (1,929); State College, PA
December 21, 2023*; 10:30 a.m., ACCNX		at Syracuse	L 43–85	1–11	JMA Wireless Dome (9,109); Syracuse, NY
December 29, 2023*; 4:00 p.m., ESPN+		at UMBC	L 53–85	1–12	Chesapeake Employers Insurance Arena (327); Catonsville, MD
NEC regular season
January 6, 2024; 4:00 p.m., NEC Front Row		Wagner	W 64–54	2–12 (1–0)	DeGol Arena (37); Loretto, PA
January 8, 2024; 7:00 p.m., NEC Front Row		Sacred Heart	L 47–86	2–13 (1–1)	DeGol Arena (83); Loretto, PA
January 13, 2024; 1:00 p.m., NEC Front Row		at Central Connecticut	L 37–61	2–14 (1–2)	William H. Detrick Gymnasium (221); New Britain, CT
January 15, 2024; 2:00 p.m., NEC Front Row		at Fairleigh Dickinson	L 54–64	2–15 (1–3)	Bogota Savings Bank Center (202); Hackensack, NJ
January 19, 2024; 7:00 p.m., NEC Front Row		at LIU	L 64–72	2–16 (1–4)	Steinberg Wellness Center (134); Brooklyn, NY
January 21, 2024; 2:00 p.m., NEC Front Row		Le Moyne	W 55–52	3–16 (2–4)	DeGol Arena (344); Loretto, PA
January 25, 2024; 6:00 p.m., ESPN+		at Stonehill	L 57–66	3–17 (2–5)	Merkert Gymnasium (563); Easton, MA
January 27, 2024; 3:00 p.m., NEC Front Row		at Merrimack	L 48–71	3–18 (2–6)	Hammel Court (617); North Andover, MA
February 1, 2024; 7:00 p.m., NEC Front Row		Central Connecticut	L 58–64	3–19 (2–7)	DeGol Arena (506); Loretto, PA
February 3, 2024; 4:00 p.m., NEC Front Row		LIU	W 61–56	4–19 (3–7)	DeGol Arena (392); Loretto, PA
February 15, 2024; 7:00 p.m., NEC Front Row		at Wagner	W 76–60	5–19 (4–7)	Spiro Sports Center (379); Staten Island, NY
February 17, 2024; 4:00 p.m., NEC Front Row		Fairleigh Dickinson	L 48–68	5–20 (4–8)	DeGol Arena (464); Loretto, PA
February 22, 2024; 7:00 p.m., NEC Front Row		Merrimack	L 57–72	5–21 (4–9)	DeGol Arena (346); Loretto, PA
February 24, 2024; 4:00 p.m., ESPN+		Stonehill	L 56–66	5–22 (4–10)	DeGol Arena (476); Loretto, PA
March 2, 2024; 2:00 p.m., NEC Front Row		at Le Moyne	L 24–56	5–23 (4–11)	Ted Grant Court (656); DeWitt, NY
March 7, 2024; 11:00 a.m., NEC Front Row		at Sacred Heart	L 47–76	5–24 (4–12)	William H. Pitt Center (1,502); Fairfield, CT
NEC tournament
March 11, 2024; 7:00 p.m., NEC Front Row	(8)	at (1) Sacred Heart; Quarterfinals	L 48–78	5–25	William H. Pitt Center (298); Fairfield, CT
*Non-conference game. ^{#}Rankings from AP poll. (#) Tournament seedings in parentheses. All times are in Eastern.
