= Everett Historic District =

Everett Historic District may refer to:

- Everett Historic District (Peninsula, Ohio), listed on the National Register of Historic Places in Ohio
- Everett Historic District (Everett, Pennsylvania), listed on the National Register of Historic Places in Pennsylvania
- Everetts Historic District, Martin County, North Carolina
