= 2023–24 Le Moyne Dolphins women's basketball team =

American college basketball season

2023–24 Le Moyne Dolphins women's basketball

WNIT, first round
- Conference: Northeast Conference
- Record: 18–15 (14–2 NEC)
- Head coach: Mary Grimes (3rd season)
- Assistant coaches: Joanna Dobrovosky; Katie Kolinski; Terence Mannion
- Home arena: Ted Grant Court

2023–24 Northeast Conference women's basketball standings
	Conf.				Overall
Team	W		L	PCT	W		L	PCT
Sacred Heart †	15	–	1	.938	24	–	10	.706
Le Moyne*	14	–	2	.875	18	–	15	.545
Fairleigh Dickinson	11	–	5	.688	14	–	17	.452
Merrimack	8	–	8	.500	12	–	19	.387
Central Connecticut	7	–	9	.438	9	–	21	.300
LIU	5	–	11	.313	8	–	22	.267
Stonehill*	4	–	12	.250	4	–	26	.133
Saint Francis	4	–	12	.250	5	–	25	.167
Wagner	4	–	12	.250	7	–	21	.250
† 2024 NEC tournament winner * ineligible for the 2024 NCAA tournament due to transition period

The 2023–24 Le Moyne Dolphins women's basketball team represented Le Moyne College during the 2023–24 NCAA Division I women's basketball season. The Dolphins, led by third-year head coach Mary Grimes, played their home games on Ted Grant Court in the Le Moyne Events Center in DeWitt, New York (Note: Though the campus, including the Le Moyne Events Center, has a Syracuse mailing address, it lies within the adjacent town of DeWitt.) as first-year members of the Northeast Conference (NEC) and as an NCAA Division I program.

The Dolphins finished the season 18–15, 14–2 in NEC play, to finish in second place. They were bested by top seed Sacred Heart in the championship of the NEC tournament. The Dolphins received an automatic bid to the WNIT, where they were defeated by Niagara in the first round.

On April 24, 2024, Grimes departed from the program after three seasons after being hired as the head coach of Binghamton. The Dolphins hired Bowling Green assistant Nick DiPillo as their new head coach on May 23.

== Previous season ==
The Dolphins finished the 2022–23 season 21–7, 16–4 in NE-10 play, to finish as NE-10 co-regular-season champions, alongside Assumption. They were upset by Pace in the quarterfinals of the NE-10 tournament. The Dolphins received an at-large bid to the NCAA DII women's tournament, as the No. 4 seed in the East Region. There, they were defeated by #5 region seed and conference foe Bentley in the first round. This was Le Moyne's final season as a member of the Northeast-10 Conference, as on May 10, it was announced that they would begin their transition to Division I, joining the Northeast Conference, with the move becoming official on July 1.

== Roster ==
2023–24 Le Moyne Dolphins women's basketball team
Players
Coaches

Pos.	#	Name	Height	Year	Previous school	Hometown
G	1	Lytoya Baker	5 ft 9 in (1.75 m)	Sr	Bishop Kearney High School	Rochester, NY
G	3	Kaia Goode	5 ft 4 in (1.63 m)	So	Bishop Kearney High School	Rochester, NY
G	4	Sierra Linnin	5 ft 8 in (1.73 m)	So	Albertus Magnus High School	Valley Cottage, NY
G	5	Michelina Lombardi	5 ft 6 in (1.68 m)	So	Averill Park High School	Wynantskill, NY
G	10	Sydney Lusher	5 ft 11 in (1.8 m)	GS	Oneida High School	Oneida, NY
G	11	Zhara Adeyemi	5 ft 10 in (1.78 m)	Fr	South Shore High School	Brooklyn, NY
F	12	Sydney Postell	5 ft 10 in (1.78 m)	Fr	Churchville-Chili High School	Churchville, NY
F	14	Kaitlyn Walker	6 ft 1 in (1.85 m)	GS	St. John Fisher	Camillus, NY
G	23	Emily Florvil	5 ft 6 in (1.68 m)	Jr	Nazareth High School	Brooklyn, NY
F	24	Haedyn Roberts	6 ft 1 in (1.85 m)	RS Jr	Holland Patent High School	Holland Patent, NY
G	25	Leah Middleton	5 ft 11 in (1.8 m)	Fr	Auburn High School	Auburn, NY
F	30	Tamiya Turner	5 ft 11 in (1.8 m)	So	Howell High School	Howell, NJ
F	44	Brianna Williams	6 ft 1 in (1.85 m)	Jr	Hartford	Brampton, ON

Head coach

- Mary Grimes (Siena)

Assistant coach(es)

- Joanna Dobrovosky (Le Moyne)
- Katie Kolinski (Syracuse)
- Terence Mannion (Notre Dame)

Legend

- (C) Team captain
- (S) Suspended
- (I) Ineligible
- (W) Walk-on
- Injured
- Current redshirt

Roster

== Schedule and results ==
Date time, TV	Rank^{#}	Opponent^{#}	Result	Record	Site (attendance) city, state
Non-conference regular season
November 6, 2023*; 7:30 p.m., MW Network		at Colorado State	L 49–69	0–1	Moby Arena (1,357); Fort Collins, CO
November 8, 2023*; 8:00 p.m.		at No. 20 Colorado	L 38–97	0–2	CU Events Center (1,893); Boulder, CO
November 11, 2023*; 2:00 p.m., NEC Front Row		Stony Brook	L 61–82	0–3	Ted Grant Court (368); DeWitt, NY
November 13, 2023*; 8:30 p.m.		at No. 10 USC	L 42–93	0–4	Galen Center (1,009); Los Angeles, CA
November 18, 2023*; 1:00 p.m., ESPN+		at UMass Lowell	W 63–61 ^{OT}	1–4	Costello Athletic Center (252); Lowell, MA
November 22, 2023*; 1:00 p.m., ESPN+		at Boston University	L 53–64	1–5	Case Gym (361); Boston, MA
December 3, 2023*; 2:00 p.m., ESPN+		at Richmond	L 40–69	1–6	Robins Center (478); Richmond, VA
December 5, 2023*; 6:00 p.m., ESPN+		at VCU	L 32–55	1–7	Siegel Center (300); Richmond, VA
December 8, 2023*; 6:00 p.m., ESPN+		at Colgate	L 57–65	1–8	Cotterell Court (210); Hamilton, NY
December 16, 2023*; 2:00 p.m., ESPN+		at Buffalo	W 66–61	2–8	Alumni Arena (1,365); Amherst, NY
December 21, 2023*; 11:00 a.m., ESPN+		at Rhode Island	L 53–97	2–9	Ryan Center (6,918); Kingston, RI
December 28, 2023*; 7:00 p.m., ACCNX		at Pittsburgh	L 39–56	2–10	Petersen Events Center (1,097); Pittsburgh, PA
December 31, 2023*; 12:00 p.m., NEC Front Row		Princeton	L 55–66	2–11	Ted Grant Court (166); DeWitt, NY
NEC regular season
January 6, 2024; 2:00 p.m., NEC Front Row		Fairleigh Dickinson	W 65–52	3–11 (1–0)	Ted Grant Court (268); DeWitt, NY
January 13, 2024; 3:00 p.m., NEC Front Row		at Merrimack	W 74–59	4–11 (2–0)	Hammel Court (354); North Andover, MA
January 15, 2024; 2:00 p.m., NEC Front Row		at Sacred Heart	W 60–56	5–11 (3–0)	William H. Pitt Center (442); Fairfield, CT
January 19, 2024; 7:00 p.m., YES/ESPN+		Central Connecticut	W 57–44	6–11 (4–0)	Ted Grant Court (857); DeWitt, NY
January 21, 2024; 2:00 p.m., NEC Front Row		at Saint Francis	L 52–55	6–12 (4–1)	DeGol Arena (344); Loretto, PA
January 25, 2024; 7:00 p.m., NEC Front Row		Merrimack	W 64–57	7–12 (5–1)	Ted Grant Court (464); DeWitt, NY
January 27, 2024; 2:00 p.m., NEC Front Row		at LIU	W 80–62	8–12 (6–1)	Steinberg Wellness Center (178); Brooklyn, NY
February 1, 2024; 7:00 p.m., NEC Front Row		Wagner	W 56–45	9–12 (7–1)	Ted Grant Court (410); DeWitt, NY
February 3, 2024; 2:00 p.m., NEC Front Row		Sacred Heart	L 55–73	9–13 (7–2)	Ted Grant Court (403); DeWitt, NY
February 9, 2024; 7:00 p.m., NEC Front Row		Stonehill	W 72–51	10–13 (8–2)	Ted Grant Court (572); DeWitt, NY
February 15, 2024; 7:00 p.m., NEC Front Row		at Central Connecticut	W 69–54	11–13 (9–2)	William H. Detrick Gymnasium (392); New Britain, CT
February 17, 2024; 2:00 p.m., NEC Front Row		at Stonehill	W 55–44	12–13 (10–2)	Merkert Gymnasium (647); Easton, MA
February 22, 2024; 7:00 p.m., NEC Front Row		LIU	W 58–45	13–13 (11–2)	Ted Grant Court (458); DeWitt, NY
February 24, 2024; 2:00 p.m., NEC Front Row		at Fairleigh Dickinson	W 70–60	14–13 (12–2)	Bogota Savings Bank Center (234); Hackensack, NJ
February 29, 2024; 7:00 p.m., ESPN+		at Wagner	W 55–46	15–13 (13–2)	Spiro Sports Center (518); Staten Island, NY
March 2, 2024; 2:00 p.m., NEC Front Row		Saint Francis	W 56–24	16–13 (14–2)	Ted Grant Court (656); DeWitt, NY
NEC tournament
March 11, 2024*; 7:00 p.m., NEC Front Row	(2)	(7) Stonehill; Quarterfinals	W 79–59	17–13	Ted Grant Court; DeWitt, NY
March 14, 2024*; 7:00 p.m., YES/ESPN+	(2)	(3) Fairleigh Dickinson; Semifinals	W 52–38	18–13	Ted Grant Court; DeWitt, NY
March 17, 2024*; 12:00 p.m., ESPNU	(2)	at (1) Sacred Heart; Championship	L 48–69	18–13	William H. Pitt Center (1,467); Fairfield, CT
WNIT
March 22, 2024*; 7:00 p.m., ESPN+		at Niagara; First round	L 86–91	18–15	Gallagher Center (809); Lewiston, NY
*Non-conference game. ^{#}Rankings from AP poll. (#) Tournament seedings in parentheses. All times are in Eastern.
