= Mary Grimes (basketball) =

American basketball coach and former player

Current position
- Title: Head coach
- Team: Binghamton
- Conference: America East
- Record: 35–28 (.556)

Playing career
- 1999–2003: Siena

Coaching career (HC unless noted)
- 2003–2005: Le Moyne (asst.)
- 2005–2010: Syracuse (asst.)
- 2010–2017: Albany (asst.)
- 2017–2019: Le Moyne (asst.)
- 2019–2021: Xavier (asst.)
- 2021–2024: Le Moyne
- 2024–present: Binghamton

Head coaching record
- Overall: 53–43 (.552) (D-I); 38–15 (.717) (D-II)

Accomplishments and honors

Awards
- NEC coach of the year (2024); NE10 coach of the year (2023)

Mary Grimes is an American basketball coach and former player who is the head coach of the Binghamton Bearcats women's basketball team. Prior to joining Binghamton, Grimes was head coach at Le Moyne College from 2021 to 2024.

== Coaching career ==
In 2019, Grimes joined the Xavier Musketeers women's basketball team as an assistant coach for first-year head coach Melanie Moore.

On June 15, 2021, Grimes was hired as the sixth head coach in Le Moyne Dolphins women's basketball program history. During her three season leading the Dolphins, Grimes lead the team to a 56–30 (.651) record, a national postseason appearance each year, and a Northeast Conference women's basketball tournament championship appearance in 2024. At the end of the 2023–24 season, Grimes was also named Northeast Conference coach of the year.

On April 24, 2024, Grimes was hired as head coach for the women's basketball program at Binghamton University in Vestal, New York.
