= 2023–24 Stonehill Skyhawks women's basketball team =

American college women's basketball season

2023–24 Stonehill Skyhawks women's basketball
- Conference: Northeast Conference
- Record: 4–26 (4–12 NEC)
- Head coach: Trisha Brown (23rd season)
- Assistant coaches: Marcus Reilly; Jill Conroy; Jhay Fletcher
- Home arena: Merkert Gymnasium

2023–24 Northeast Conference women's basketball standings
	Conf.				Overall
Team	W		L	PCT	W		L	PCT
Sacred Heart †	15	–	1	.938	24	–	10	.706
Le Moyne*	14	–	2	.875	18	–	15	.545
Fairleigh Dickinson	11	–	5	.688	14	–	17	.452
Merrimack	8	–	8	.500	12	–	19	.387
Central Connecticut	7	–	9	.438	9	–	21	.300
LIU	5	–	11	.313	8	–	22	.267
Stonehill*	4	–	12	.250	4	–	26	.133
Saint Francis	4	–	12	.250	5	–	25	.167
Wagner	4	–	12	.250	7	–	21	.250
† 2024 NEC tournament winner * ineligible for the 2024 NCAA tournament due to transition period

The 2023–24 Stonehill Skyhawks women's basketball team represented Stonehill College during the 2023–24 NCAA Division I women's basketball season. The Skyhawks, who were led by 23rd-year head coach Trisha Brown, played their home games at Merkert Gymnasium in Easton, Massachusetts as members of the Northeast Conference (NEC).

This season was Stonehill's second year of a four-year transition period from Division II to Division I. As a result, the Skyhawks are not eligible for NCAA postseason play until the 2026–27 season.

The Skyhawks finished the season 4–26, 4–12 in NEC play, to finish in a three-way tie for seventh place. They were upset by Le Moyne in the quarterfinals of the NEC tournament.

== Previous season ==
The Skyhawks finished the 2022–23 season 9–20, 5–11 in NEC play, to finish in a tie for seventh place. Due to their transition to Division I, they were ineligible to participate in the NEC tournament.

== Roster ==
2023–24 Stonehill Skyhawks women's basketball team
Players
Coaches

Pos.	#	Name	Height	Year	Previous school	Hometown
G	1	Chayil Mauristhene	5 ft 8 in (1.73 m)	Fr	Noble and Greenough School	Milton, MA
G	2	Jada Thornton	5 ft 9 in (1.75 m)	Sr	Gaithersburg High School	Germantown, MD
G	3	Brooke Paquette	5 ft 8 in (1.73 m)	Fr	Bishop Guertin High School	Hudson, NH
F	4	Cameron Ward	5 ft 10 in (1.78 m)	Sr	Bound Brook High School	Bound Brook, NJ
G	5	Chelsea Graiver	5 ft 6 in (1.68 m)	So	Greely High School	Falmouth, ME
G	10	Sharn Hayward	5 ft 6 in (1.68 m)	Jr	Marist Regional College	Penguin, Australia
G	12	Breana Delaney	5 ft 9 in (1.75 m)	Fr	St. John Vianney High School	Marlboro, NJ
C	13	Isabella Mallory	6 ft 2 in (1.88 m)	Fr	E. O. Smith High School	Mansfield Center, CT
G/F	15	Lauren Sampson	6 ft 1 in (1.85 m)	GS	Providence	Waltham, MA
G	21	Anna Boruta	5 ft 10 in (1.78 m)	GS	Northeastern	Vienna, Austria
F	22	Emma Arcà	6 ft 1 in (1.85 m)	Fr	St. Andrew's School	Rome, Italy
G/F	30	Catelyn Wheeler	5 ft 10 in (1.78 m)	Fr	Bishop Guertin High School	Tyngsborough, MA
F	31	Paige Martin	6 ft 0 in (1.83 m)	So	St. Francis Brooklyn	Hastings-on-Hudson, NY
F	44	Maureen Stapleton	6 ft 0 in (1.83 m)	Jr	St. Rose High School	Spring Lake Heights, NJ

Head coach

- Trisha Brown (Harvard)

Assistant coach(es)

- Marcus Reilly (Trinity (CT))
- Jill Conroy (Holy Family)
- Jhay Fletcher (UT Southern)

Legend

- (C) Team captain
- (S) Suspended
- (I) Ineligible
- (W) Walk-on
- Injured
- Current redshirt

Roster
Last update: March 12, 2024

== Schedule and results ==
Date time, TV	Rank^{#}	Opponent^{#}	Result	Record	Site (attendance) city, state
Non-conference regular season
November 6, 2023*; 6:00 p.m., NEC Front Row		Northeastern	L 61–73	0–1	Merkert Gymnasium (443); Easton, MA
November 9, 2023*; 8:00 p.m., FloHoops		at DePaul	L 52–99	0–2	Wintrust Arena (849); Chicago, IL
November 11, 2023*; 2:00 p.m., NEC Front Row		Lehigh	L 50–62	0–3	Merkert Gymnasium (360); Easton, MA
November 14, 2023*; 6:00 p.m., NEC Front Row		Bryant	L 49–69	0–4	Merkert Gymnasium (118); Easton, MA
November 17, 2023*; 6:00 p.m., ESPN+		at Buffalo	L 39–60	0–5	Alumni Arena (1,276); Amherst, NY
November 19, 2023*; 1:00 p.m., ESPN+		at Niagara	L 69–71	0–6	Gallagher Center (397); Lewiston, NY
November 25, 2023*; 2:00 p.m., NEC Front Row		Utah Tech	L 58–81	0–7	Merkert Gymnasium (118); Easton, MA
November 29, 2023*; 7:30 p.m., NEC Front Row		Holy Cross	L 32–59	0–8	Merkert Gymnasium (127); Easton, MA
December 6, 2023*; 6:00 p.m., NEC Front Row		New Hampshire	L 41–68	0–9	Merkert Gymnasium (327); Easton, MA
December 12, 2023*; 11:00 a.m., ACCNX		at Boston College	L 37–101	0–10	Conte Forum (3,630); Chestnut Hill, MA
December 16, 2023*; 2:00 p.m., ESPN+		at Albany	L 38–77	0–11	Broadview Center (790); Albany, NY
December 21, 2023*; 11:00 a.m., ESPN+		at George Washington	L 34–67	0–12	Charles E. Smith Center (304); Washington, D.C.
December 30, 2023*; 2:00 p.m., NEC Front Row		Fairfield	L 49–72	0–13	Merkert Gymnasium (431); Easton, MA
NEC regular season
January 6, 2024; 2:00 p.m., NEC Front Row		at LIU	L 52–54	0–14 (0–1)	Steinberg Wellness Center (134); Brooklyn, NY
January 8, 2024; 4:00 p.m., NEC Front Row		at Central Connecticut	L 59–71	0–15 (0–2)	William H. Detrick Gymnasium (275); New Britain, CT
January 13, 2024; 2:00 p.m., NEC Front Row		Fairleigh Dickinson	W 60–56	1–15 (1–2)	Merkert Gymnasium (416); Easton, MA
January 15, 2024; 2:00 p.m., NEC Front Row		Wagner	W 67–44	2–15 (2–2)	Merkert Gymnasium (387); Easton, MA
January 19, 2024; 7:00 p.m., NEC Front Row		at Fairleigh Dickinson	L 50–61	2–16 (2–3)	Bogota Savings Bank Center (130); Hackensack, NJ
January 21, 2024; 2:00 p.m., NEC Front Row		Merrimack	L 60–72	2–17 (2–4)	Merkert Gymnasium (508); Easton, MA
January 25, 2024; 6:00 p.m., NEC Front Row		Saint Francis	W 66–57	3–17 (3–4)	Merkert Gymnasium (563); Easton, MA
February 1, 2024; 6:00 p.m., NEC Front Row		Sacred Heart	L 53–80	3–18 (3–5)	Merkert Gymnasium (381); Easton, MA
February 3, 2024; 4:00 p.m., NEC Front Row		at Wagner	L 55–63	3–19 (3–6)	Spiro Sports Center (623); Staten Island, NY
February 9, 2024; 7:00 p.m., NEC Front Row		at Le Moyne	L 51–72	3–20 (3–7)	Ted Grant Court (572); DeWitt, NY
February 15, 2024; 7:00 p.m., NEC Front Row		at Merrimack	L 56–74	3–21 (3–8)	Hammel Court (577); North Andover, MA
February 17, 2024; 2:00 p.m., NEC Front Row		Le Moyne	L 44–55	3–22 (3–9)	Merkert Gymnasium (647); Easton, MA
February 24, 2024; 4:00 p.m., ESPN+		at Saint Francis	W 66–56	4–22 (4–9)	DeGol Arena (476); Loretto, PA
February 29, 2024; 7:00 p.m., NEC Front Row		at Sacred Heart	L 49–78	4–23 (4–10)	William H. Pitt Center (441); Fairfield, CT
March 2, 2024; 2:00 p.m., NEC Front Row		Central Connecticut	L 45–64	4–24 (4–11)	Merkert Gymnasium (147); Easton, MA
March 7, 2024; 6:00 p.m., NEC Front Row		LIU	L 65–74	4–25 (4–12)	Merkert Gymnasium (112); Easton, MA
NEC tournament
March 11, 2024; 7:00 p.m., NEC Front Row	(7)	at (2) Le Moyne; Quarterfinals	L 59–79	4–26	Ted Grant Court (–); DeWitt, NY
*Non-conference game. ^{#}Rankings from AP poll. (#) Tournament seedings in parentheses. All times are in Eastern.
