= Everett Area School District =

School district in Pennsylvania, U.S.

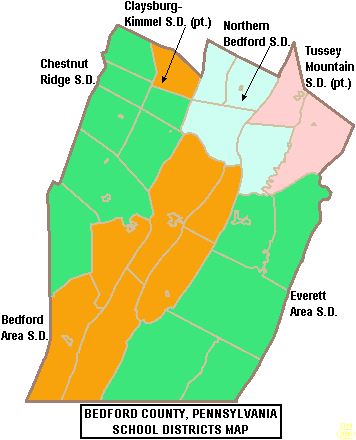

Address
- 427 East South Street Bedford County, Pennsylvania Everett, Bedford County, Pennsylvania, 15537; United States

District information
- Type: Public

Students and staff
- Athletic conference: PIAA District V
- District mascot: Warriors
- Colors: Red and white

Other information
- Website: https://www.everettasd.org/

Everett Area School District is a small, rural, public school district in Bedford County, Pennsylvania. It serves a rural region and encompasses the borough of Everett and the townships of West Providence, East Providence, Monroe, Southampton, and Mann. Everett Area School District encompasses 300 square miles (780 km^{2}) of southern Pennsylvania. According to 2000 federal census data, Everett Area School District served a resident population of 9,949. Per US Census Bureau data, the resident population declined to 9,704 in 2010. The educational attainment levels for the Everett Area School District population (25 years old and over) were 81.9% high school graduates and 11.6% college graduates. The district is one of the 500 public school districts of Pennsylvania.

According to the Pennsylvania Budget and Policy Center, 50.5% of the district's pupils lived at 185% or below the Federal Poverty level as shown by their eligibility for the federal free or reduced price school meal programs in 2012. In 2009, the district residents’ per capita income was $16,205, while the median family income was $35,435. In the Commonwealth, the median family income was $49,501 and the United States median family income was $49,445, in 2010. In Bedford County, the median household income was $40,249. By 2013, the median household income in the United States rose to $52,100.

Everett Area School District operates three schools: Everett Area Elementary School, Everett Area Middle School and Everett Area High School. High school students can attend the Bedford County Technical Center for training in the construction trades or culinary arts as well as other careers. The district formerly operated the Breezewood Elementary School in Breezewood, until it was closed in 2024.

== Extracurriculars ==
Everett Area School District offers a wide variety of clubs, activities and an extensive sport program. Which include art clubs, D&D clubs, Comic book Club, Coloring club, and more inclusive clubs.

=== Sports ===
The school district operates:

Varsity

Boys

- Basketball - Class AA
- Baseball - Class AA
- Football - Class A
- Golf - Class AA
- Rifle - AAAA
- Soccer - Class A
- Softball - Class AA
- Track and field - Class AA
- Wrestling - Class AA

Girls

- Basketball - AA
- Cheer - AAAA
- Golf - AA
- Soccer (Fall) - A
- Softball - AA
- Track and field - AA
- Volleyball - A

MiddleSchool Sports

Boys

- Baseball
- Basketball
- Football
- Soccer
- Wrestling

Girls

- Basketball
- Cheer
- Softball
- Volleyball

According to PIAA directory July 2015
