= 2023–24 LIU Sharks women's basketball team =

Intercollegiate basketball season

2023–24 LIU Sharks women's basketball
- Conference: Northeast Conference
- Record: 7–20 (4–10 NEC)
- Head coach: Rene Haynes
- Assistant coaches: Chris Dunn; Toccara Toland
- Home arena: Steinberg Wellness Center

2023–24 Northeast Conference women's basketball standings
	Conf.				Overall
Team	W		L	PCT	W		L	PCT
Sacred Heart †	15	–	1	.938	24	–	10	.706
Le Moyne*	14	–	2	.875	18	–	15	.545
Fairleigh Dickinson	11	–	5	.688	14	–	17	.452
Merrimack	8	–	8	.500	12	–	19	.387
Central Connecticut	7	–	9	.438	9	–	21	.300
LIU	5	–	11	.313	8	–	22	.267
Stonehill*	4	–	12	.250	4	–	26	.133
Saint Francis	4	–	12	.250	5	–	25	.167
Wagner	4	–	12	.250	7	–	21	.250
† 2024 NEC tournament winner * ineligible for the 2024 NCAA tournament due to transition period

The 2023–24 LIU Sharks women's basketball team represented Long Island University (LIU) during the 2023–24 NCAA Division I women's basketball season.

== Offseason ==
=== Incoming transfers ===
Name	Number	Pos.	Height	Year	Hometown	Previous school
Alexzeya Brooks	3	G	5'11"	JR	Binghamton, NY	UMass
Estie Varga	10	G	5'8"	GS Senior	Kaposvár, Hungary	St. Francis Brooklyn
Nigeria Harkless	15	F	6'2"	JR	Jacksonville, FL	Mercer
Samantha Bailey	23	F	6'1"	GS Senior	Grand Island, NY	Marist
Amaya Dowdy	25	F	6'0"	JR	Woonsocket, RI	UMass Lowell

== Roster ==
2023–24 LIU Sharks women's basketball team
Players
Coaches

Pos.	#	Name	Height	Year	Previous school	Hometown
F	0	De'Asia Thomas	6 ft 0 in (1.83 m)	Sr	Sapulpa	Tulsa, OK
G	1	Emaia O'Brien	5 ft 1 in (1.55 m)	Jr	Chandler Park Academy	Detroit, MI
G	2	Nia Santiago	5 ft 10 in (1.78 m)	Fr	Viera	Melbourne, FL
G	3	Alexzeya Brooks	5 ft 9 in (1.75 m)	Jr	Westtown School/UMass	Binghamton, NY
G	4	Kayla Tilus	5 ft 11 in (1.8 m)	So	Notre Dame Catholic High School	Bridgeport, CT
G	5	Janessa Williams	5 ft 9 in (1.75 m)	Fr	The King's Academy	Lake Worth, FL
G	10	Estie Varga	5 ft 8 in (1.73 m)	GS	PTE Babits Mihaly/St. Francis Brooklyn	Kaposvár, Hungary
G	11	Mariah Elohim	5 ft 10 in (1.78 m)	So	Westlake	Westlake Village, CA
G	12	Ashley Austin	5 ft 6 in (1.68 m)	Sr	Lynwood/Texas Southern	Compton, CA
F	14	Dia Dénes	6 ft 1 in (1.85 m)	So	Szabó lorinc	Budapest, Hungary
F	15	Nigeria Harkless	6 ft 2 in (1.88 m)	Jr	Jean Ribault/Mercer	Jacksonville, FL
G	22	Racky Kane	5 ft 10 in (1.78 m)	Fr	South Shore	New York, NY
F	23	Samantha Bailey	6 ft 1 in (1.85 m)	GS	Grand Island/Marist	Grand Island, NY
F	25	Amaya Dowdy	6 ft 0 in (1.83 m)	Jr	St. Raphael Academy/UMass Lowell	Woonsocket, RI
C	33	Sydni Smith	6 ft 2 in (1.88 m)	So	Union	Tulsa, OK

Head coach

- Rene Haynes (Michigan State)

Assistant coach(es)

- Chris Dunn (West Virginia State)
- Toccara Toland (Ferrum)

Legend

- (C) Team captain
- (S) Suspended
- (I) Ineligible
- (W) Walk-on
- Injured
- Current redshirt

Roster
Last update: November 15, 2023

== Schedule ==
Date time, TV	Rank^{#}	Opponent^{#}	Result	Record	Site (attendance) city, state
Non-conference regular season
November 6, 2023*; 7:00 p.m., FloSports		at St. John's	L 44–81	0–1	Carnesecca Arena (386); Queens, NY
November 8, 2023*; 6:00 p.m., Big Ten+		at Minnesota	L 57–92	0–2	Williams Arena (3,141); Minneapolis, MN
November 12, 2023*; 7:00 p.m.		at Iona	L 59–80	0–3	Hynes Athletic Center (783); New Rochelle, NY
November 18, 2023*; 2:00 p.m.		Lafayette	L 51–54	0–4	Steinberg Wellness Center (175); Brooklyn, NY
November 24, 2023*; 7:00 p.m.		CSU Bakersfield	L 57–62	0–5	Steinberg Wellness Center (125); Brooklyn, NY
November 25, 2023*; 4:00 p.m.		Hampton	W 60–53	1–5	Steinberg Wellness Center (140); Brooklyn, NY
November 30, 2023*; 7:00 p.m., SNY		Saint Peter's	L 54–63	1–6	Steinberg Wellness Center (89); Brooklyn, NY
December 4, 2023*; 5:30 p.m.		at Delaware State	L 59–84	1–7	Memorial Hall (400); Dover, DE
December 6, 2023*; 6:00 p.m., ACCNX		at No. 15 Virginia Tech	L 50–98	1–8	Cassell Coliseum (3,849); Blacksburg, VA
December 21, 2023*; 12:00 p.m., SNY		Manhattan	L 55–66	1–9	Steinberg Wellness Center (196); Brooklyn, NY
December 31, 2023*; 1:00 p.m., ESPN+		at NJIT	L 54–58	1–10	Fleisher Center (250); Newark, NJ
January 6, 2024; 2:00 p.m.		Stonehill	W 54–52	2–10 (1–0)	Steinberg Wellness Center (134); Brooklyn, NY
January 8, 2024; 7:00 p.m., NEC Front Row		at Wagner	L 66–75	2–11 (1–1)	Spiro Sports Center (487); Staten Island, NY
January 13, 2024; 2:00 p.m.		Sacred Heart	L 56–67	2–12 (1–2)	Steinberg Wellness Center (154); Brooklyn, NY
January 15, 2024*; 2:00 p.m.		at Chicago State	W 66–58	3–12	Emil and Patricia Jones Convocation Center (84); Chicago, IL
January 19, 2024; 7:00 p.m., NEC Front Row		Saint Francis	W 72–64	4–12 (2–2)	Steinberg Wellness Center (134); Brooklyn, NY
January 21, 2024; 1:00 p.m.		at Central Connecticut	W 57–50	5–12 (3–2)	William H. Detrick Gymnasium (371); New Britain, CT
January 25, 2024; 2:00 p.m.		at Sacred Heart	L 55–70	5–13 (3–3)	William H. Pitt Center (520); Fairfield, CT
January 27, 2024; 2:00 p.m., NEC Front Row		Le Moyne	L 62–80	5–14 (3–4)	Steinberg Wellness Center (178); Brooklyn, NY
February 1, 2024; 7:00 p.m., ESPN+		FDU	L 56–59	5–15 (3–5)	Steinberg Wellness Center (130); Brooklyn, NY
February 3, 2024; 4:00 p.m., NEC Front Row		at Saint Francis	L 56–61	5–16 (3–6)	DeGol Arena (392); Loretto, PA
February 5, 2024*; 5:00 p.m., NEC Front Row		Chicago State	W 80–71	6–16	Steinberg Wellness Center (182); Brooklyn, NY
February 9, 2024; 7:00 p.m., NEC Front Row		at Merrimack	L 51–68	6–17 (3–7)	Hammel Court (653); North Andover, MA
February 15, 2024; 7:00 p.m., NEC Front Row		at FDU	L 53–84	6–18 (3–8)	Rothman Center (207); Teaneck, NJ
February 17, 2024; 2:00 p.m.		Merrimack	L 61–79	6–19 (3–9)	Steinberg Wellness Center (130); Brooklyn, NY
February 22, 2024; 2:00 p.m., NEC Front Row		at Le Moyne	L 45–58	6–20 (3–10)	Ted Grant Court (458); DeWitt, NY
February 24, 2024; 2:00 p.m., NEC Front Row		Wagner	W 70–65	7–20 (4–10)	Steinberg Wellness Center; Brooklyn, NY
February 29, 2024; 7:00 p.m.		Central Connecticut State	L 56–65	7–21 (4–11)	Steinberg Wellness Center (135); Brooklyn, NY
March 7, 2024; 6:00 p.m., NEC Front Row		at Stonehill	W 74–65	8–21 (5–11)	Merkert Gymnasium (112); Easton, MA
Northeast Conference women's tournament
March 11, 2024; 7:00pm	(6)	at (3) FDU; Quarterfinals	L 59–71	8–22	Bogota Savings Bank Center (677); Hackensack, NJ
*Non-conference game. ^{#}Rankings from AP poll. (#) Tournament seedings in parentheses. All times are in Eastern.
