= 2023–24 Merrimack Warriors women's basketball team =

Intercollegiate basketball season

2023–24 Merrimack Warriors women's basketball
- Conference: Northeast Conference
- Record: 12–19 (8–8 NEC)
- Head coach: Kelly Morrone (4th season)
- Assistant coaches: Emily Taylor; Paige McCormick; Jermaine Cooper Sr.
- Home arena: Hammel Court

2023–24 Northeast Conference women's basketball standings
	Conf.				Overall
Team	W		L	PCT	W		L	PCT
Sacred Heart †	15	–	1	.938	24	–	10	.706
Le Moyne*	14	–	2	.875	18	–	15	.545
Fairleigh Dickinson	11	–	5	.688	14	–	17	.452
Merrimack	8	–	8	.500	12	–	19	.387
Central Connecticut	7	–	9	.438	9	–	21	.300
LIU	5	–	11	.313	8	–	22	.267
Stonehill*	4	–	12	.250	4	–	26	.133
Saint Francis	4	–	12	.250	5	–	25	.167
Wagner	4	–	12	.250	7	–	21	.250
† 2024 NEC tournament winner * ineligible for the 2024 NCAA tournament due to transition period

The 2023–24 Merrimack Warriors women's basketball team represented Merrimack College during the 2023–24 NCAA Division I women's basketball season. They were led by fourth-year head coach Kelly Morrone and played their home games at Hammel Court in Andover, Massachusetts as members of the Northeast Conference (NEC).

This was the Warriors' final season in the NEC. On October 25, 2023, Merrimack and the Metro Atlantic Athletic Conference jointly announced that the university would join that conference on July 1, 2024.

== Offseason ==
=== Incoming transfers ===
Name	Number	Pos.	Height	Year	Hometown	Previous school
Izabella Forker	12	G	5' 8"	Freshman	Telford, PA	Fairfield
Rose Caso	40	G/F	5' 10"	R–Sophomore	Ellington, CT	Quinnipiac

== Roster ==
2023–24 Merrimack Warriors women's basketball team
Players
Coaches

Pos.	#	Name	Height	Year	Previous school	Hometown
F	0	Madison Roman	6 ft 0 in (1.83 m)	Fr	Fairfield Ludlowe	Fairfield, CT
G	1	Jayme DeCesare	5 ft 5 in (1.65 m)		La Salle Academy	Johnston, RI
G	2	Diamond Christian	5 ft 5 in (1.65 m)		The Pennington School	The Bronx, NY
G	3	Ava Owens	5 ft 10 in (1.78 m)	Jr	St. Andrew's School	Pelham, NH
G	5	Kaylee Thomas	5 ft 9 in (1.75 m)		Central Catholic	North Chelmsford, MA
G	10	Paloma Garcia	5 ft 6 in (1.68 m)	Fr	Proctor Academy	Corozal, Puerto Rico
G	11	Thalia Shepard	5 ft 9 in (1.75 m)	Fr	St. Andrew's School	Boston, MA
G	12	Izabella Forker	5 ft 8 in (1.73 m)	Fr	Faith Christian Academy/Fairfield	Telford, PA
G	13	Tara Murray	5 ft 11 in (1.8 m)	Fr	St. Mary's	Deer Park, NY
F	15	Antoinette Okoh	5 ft 11 in (1.8 m)	Jr	Cardinal Spellman	Brockton, MA
G/F	21	Cadence Johnson	6 ft 0 in (1.83 m)	Fr	St. Andrew's School	Mattapoisett, MA
G	22	Lydia Melaschenko	5 ft 7 in (1.7 m)	So	Capital Courts Academy	Ottawa, ON
G	24	Molly Manion	5 ft 11 in (1.8 m)	Jr	West Chester, PA
F	32	Kylee Fears	6 ft 1 in (1.85 m)	Fr	Talawanda	Oxford, OH
G/F	40	Rose Caso	5 ft 10 in (1.78 m)	RS So	Suffield Academy/Quinnipiac	Ellington, CT

Head coach

- Kelly Morrone (South Carolina)

Assistant coach(es)

- Emily Taylor (John Carroll)
- Paige McCormick (Merrimack)
- Jermaine Cooper Sr. (Ohio State)

Legend

- (C) Team captain
- (S) Suspended
- (I) Ineligible
- (W) Walk-on
- Injured
- Current redshirt

Roster
Last update: March 22, 2024

== Schedule ==
Date time, TV	Rank^{#}	Opponent^{#}	Result	Record	Site (attendance) city, state
Non-conference regular season
November 6, 2023*; 7:00 p.m.		Albany	L 55–58	0–1	Hammel Court; North Andover, MA
November 10, 2023*; 7:00 p.m., ESPN+		at NJIT	L 45–48	0–2	Wellness and Events Center (345); Newark, NJ
November 12, 2023*; 5:00 p.m., ESPN+		at Rider	L 47–61	0–3	Alumni Gymnasium (518); Lawrenceville, NJ
November 16, 2022*; 8:00 p.m., NESN+/FloHoops		at Northeastern	L 47–58	0–4	Cabot Center (231); Boston, MA
November 21, 2023*; 7:00 p.m., NEC Front Row		Bryant	W 65–60	1–4	Hammel Court; North Andover, MA
November 24, 2023*; 9:30 p.m., P12N		at No. 10 Utah	L 34–98	1–5	Jon M. Huntsman Center (4,375); Salt Lake City, UT
November 28, 2023*; 7:00 p.m., ESPN+		at Siena	W 67–64	2–5	MVP Arena (577); Albany, NY
December 1, 2023*; 11:00 a.m., NESN		UC Riverside	L 53–65	2–6	Hammel Court (296); North Andover, MA
December 3, 2023*; 1:00 p.m., NESN		Yale	W 84–73	3–6	Hammel Court (671); North Andover, MA
December 8, 2023*; 7:00 p.m., NESN+		Penn	L 62–71	3–7	Hammel Court (413); North Andover, MA
December 10, 2023*; 1:00 p.m., NESN+		Dartmouth	L 45–49	3–8	Hammel Court (754); North Andover, MA
December 17, 2023*; 2:00 p.m., ESPN+		at Bucknell	L 44–64	3–9	Sojka Pavilion (286); Lewisburg, PA
December 20, 2023*; 10:30 a.m., ESPN+		at Holy Cross	L 43–55	3–10	Hart Center (3,316); Worcester, MA
Northeast Conference regular season
January 6, 2024; 2:00 p.m., ESPN+		at Sacred Heart	L 51–65		William H. Pitt Center (455); Fairfield, CT
January 8, 2024; 7:00 p.m.		at Fairleigh Dickinson	L 51–67		Bogota Savings Bank Center (113); Teaneck, NJ
January 13, 2024; 3:00 p.m.		Le Moyne	L 59–74		Hammel Court (354); North Andover, MA
January 15, 2024; 3:00 p.m.		Central Connecticut	W 71–53		Hammel Court; North Andover, MA
January 19, 2024; 7:00 p.m.		at Wagner	W 72–45		Spiro Sports Center (1,309); Staten Island, NY
January 21, 2024; 2:00 p.m.		at Stonehill	W 72–60		Merkert Gymnasium (508); Easton, MA
January 25, 2024; 7:00 p.m.		at Le Moyne	L 57–64		Ted Grant Court (464); DeWitt, NY
January 27, 2024; 3:00 p.m.		Saint Francis (PA)	W 71–48		Hammel Court (617); North Andover, MA
February 3, 2024; 1:00 p.m.		at Central Connecticut	L 71–78		William H. Detrick Gymnasium (422); New Britain, CT
February 9, 2024; 7:00 p.m.		LIU	W 68–51		Hammel Court (653); North Andover, MA
February 15, 2024; 7:00 p.m.		Stonehill	W 74–56		Hammel Court (577); North Andover, MA
February 17, 2024; 2:00 p.m.		at LIU	W 61–59		Steinberg Wellness Center (130); Brooklyn, NY
February 22, 2024; 7:00 p.m.		at Saint Francis (PA)	W 72–57		DeGol Arena (346); Loretto, PA
February 29, 2024; 7:00 p.m.		FDU	L 63–71		Hammel Court (618); North Andover, MA
March 2, 2024; 3:00 p.m., ESPN+		Sacred Heart	L 51–64		Hammel Court (423); North Andover, MA
March 7, 2024; 3:00 p.m.		Wagner	L 65–79		Hammel Court (167); North Andover, MA
Northeast Conference women's tournament
March 11, 2024; 7:00 p.m.	(4)	(5) Central Connecticut; Quarterfinals	W 76–51		Hammel Court (319); North Andover, MA
March 14, 2024; 7:00 p.m.	(4)	at (1) Sacred Heart; Semifinals	L 41–73		William H. Pitt Center (464); Fairfield, CT
*Non-conference game. ^{#}Rankings from AP poll. (#) Tournament seedings in parentheses. All times are in Eastern.
