= 2023–24 Central Connecticut Blue Devils women's basketball team =

American college basketball season

2023–24 Central Connecticut Blue Devils women's basketball
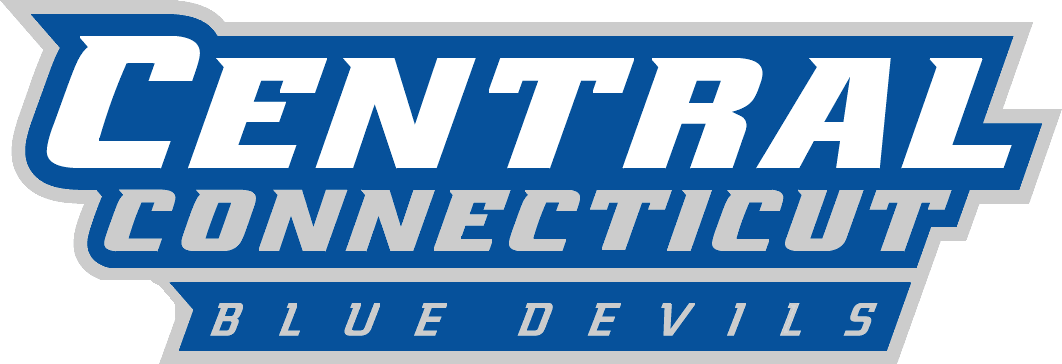
- Conference: Northeast Conference
- Record: 7–19 (5–8 NEC)
- Head coach: Way Veney (1st season)
- Assistant coaches: Danielle Spiliotis; Erica Covile
- Home arena: William H. Detrick Gymnasium

2023–24 Northeast Conference women's basketball standings
	Conf.				Overall
Team	W		L	PCT	W		L	PCT
Sacred Heart †	15	–	1	.938	24	–	10	.706
Le Moyne*	14	–	2	.875	18	–	15	.545
Fairleigh Dickinson	11	–	5	.688	14	–	17	.452
Merrimack	8	–	8	.500	12	–	19	.387
Central Connecticut	7	–	9	.438	9	–	21	.300
LIU	5	–	11	.313	8	–	22	.267
Stonehill*	4	–	12	.250	4	–	26	.133
Saint Francis	4	–	12	.250	5	–	25	.167
Wagner	4	–	12	.250	7	–	21	.250
† 2024 NEC tournament winner * ineligible for the 2024 NCAA tournament due to transition period

The 2023–24 Central Connecticut Blue Devils women's basketball team represented Central Connecticut State University during the 2023–24 NCAA Division I women's basketball season. The Blue Devils, led by first-year head coach Way Veney, played their home games at the William H. Detrick Gymnasium in New Britain, Connecticut as members of the Northeast Conference.

== Previous season ==
The Blue Devils finished the 2022–23 season 7–22, 3–13 in NEC play to finish in last place in the conference. They were defeated by Fairleigh Dickinson in the quarterfinals of the NEC tournament.

== Roster ==
2023–24 Central Connecticut Blue Devils women's basketball team
Players
Coaches

Pos.	#	Name	Height	Year	Previous school	Hometown
G	1	Samora Watson	5 ft 6 in (1.68 m)	So	Clear Falls High School	League City, Texas
G	2	Belle Lanpher	5 ft 5 in (1.65 m)	Sr	Wachusett Regional	Princeton, MA
G	5	Amaya Williams	5 ft 5 in (1.65 m)	Jr	Nottingham High School	Syracuse, NY
G	10	Emma Bruen	5 ft 7 in (1.7 m)	Jr	Saint John Vianney High School	Middletown, NJ
F	11	Kayla Henry	6 ft 0 in (1.83 m)	Fr	East Hartford High School	East Hartford, CT
G	12	Ally Sentance	5 ft 9 in (1.75 m)	So	Lincoln College Preparatory Academy	Thorold, Ontario
G	21	Cierra Pearson	5 ft 8 in (1.73 m)	So	Saddle River Day School	Teaneck, NJ
F	22	Alonna Sellers	6 ft 1 in (1.85 m)	So	Hampton High School	Hampton, VA
F	32	Meghan Kenefick	6 ft 0 in (1.83 m)	Sr	Paul VI Catholic	Oakton, VA

Head coach

- Way Veney (East Carolina)

Assistant coach(es)

- Danielle Spiliotis (Cedarville)
- Erica Covile (Temple)

Legend

- (C) Team captain
- (S) Suspended
- (I) Ineligible
- (W) Walk-on
- Injured
- Current redshirt

Roster
Last update: November 2, 2022

== Schedule and results ==
Date time, TV	Rank^{#}	Opponent^{#}	Result	Record	Site (attendance) city, state
Non-conference regular season
November 6, 2023*; 7:00 pm, ESPN+		at Manhattan	L 35–52	0–1	Ryan Center (336); New York, NY
November 10, 2023*; 7:00 pm, ACCNX		at Syracuse	L 53–101	0–2	JMA Wireless Dome (1,494); Syracuse, NY
November 13, 2023*; 7:00 pm, ESPN+		Saint Peter's	L 57–61	0–3	Yanitelli Center (385); Jersey City, NJ
November 17, 2023*; 6:00 pm, ESPN+		at Bryant	L 69–72	0–4	Chace Athletic Center (253); Smithfield, RI
November 21, 2023*; 7:00 pm, NEC Front Row		UMass Lowell	W 58–49	1–4	William H. Detrick Gymnasium (312); New Britain, CT
November 26, 2023*; 1:00 pm, NEC Front Row		Fairfield	W 78–52	1–5	William H. Detrick Gymnasium (221); New Britain, CT
November 29, 2023*; 7:00 pm, BTN+		at Illinois	L 50–89	1–6	State Farm Center (2,743); Champaign, IL
December 2, 2023*; 1:00 pm, ESPN+		at New Hampshire	L 64–79	1–7	Lundholm Gymnasium (265); Durham, NJ
December 6, 2023*; 7:00 pm, NEC Front Row		Albany	L 37–56	1–8	William H. Detrick Gymnasium (307); New Britain, CT
December 16, 2023*; 7:00 pm, FloSports		at Seton Hall	L 46–77	1–9	Walsh Gymnasium (537); South Orange, NJ
December 18, 2023*; 11:00 am, NEC Front Row		Colgate	W 69–54	2–9	William H. Detrick Gymnasium (1,511); New Britain, CT
December 20, 2023*; 11:30 am, BTN+		at Penn State	L 73–101	2–10	Bryce Jordan Center (2,764); University Park, PA
January 3, 2024*; 5:30 pm		at Morgan State	L 65–68	2–11	Hill Field House (137); Baltimore, MD
NEC regular season
January 8, 2024; 4:00 pm, NEC Front Row		Stonehill	W 71–59	3–11 (1–0)	William H. Detrick Gymnasium (230); New Britain, CT
January 13, 2024; 4:00 pm, NEC Front Row		Saint Francis	W 61–37	4–11 (2–0)	William H. Detrick Gymnasium (221); New Britain, CT
January 15, 2024; 3:00 pm, NEC Front Row		at Merrimack	L 53–71	4–12 (2–1)	Hammel Court; North Andover, MA
January 19, 2024; 7:00 pm, ESPN+		at Le Moyne	L 44–57	4–13 (2–2)	Ted Grant Court (857); Syracuse, NY
January 21, 2024; 1:00 pm, ESPN+		LIU	L 50–57	4–14 (2–3)	William H. Detrick Gymnasium (371); New Britain, CT
January 25, 2024; 8:00 pm, ESPNU/ESPN+		at Fairleigh Dickinson	L 75–80 ^{OT}	4–15 (2–4)	Bogota Savings Bank Center (113); Hackensack, NJ
January 27, 2024; 4:00 pm, NEC Front Row		at Wagner	L 45–49	4–16 (2–5)	Spiro Sports Center (577); Staten Island, NY
February 1, 2024; 7:00 pm, NEC Front Row		at Saint Francis	W 64–58	5–16 (3–5)	DeGol Arena (506); Loretto, PA
February 3, 2024; 1:00 pm, NEC Front Row		Merrimack	W 78–71	6–16 (4–5)	William H. Detrick Gymnasium (422); New Britain, CT
February 9, 2024; 7:00 pm, NEC Front Row		at Sacred Heart	L 53–58	6–17 (4–6)	William H. Pitt Center (512); Fairfield, CT
February 15, 2024; 7:00 pm, NEC Front Row		La Moyne	L 54–69	6–18 (4–7)	William H. Detrick Gymnasium (392); New Britain, CT
February 22, 2024; 7:00 pm, NEC Front Row		Wagner	W 69–61	7–18 (5–7)	William H. Detrick Gymnasium (373); New Britain, CT
February 24, 2024; 1:00 pm, NEC Front Row		Sacred Heart	L 55–73	7–19 (5–8)	William H. Detrick Gymnasium (459); New Britain, CT
February 29, 2024; 7:00 pm, NEC Front Row		at LIU	W 65-56	8-19 (6-8)	Steinberg Wellness Center (134); Brooklyn, NY
March 2, 2024; 2:00 pm, NEC Front Row		at Stonehill	W 64-45	9-19 (7-8)	Merkert Gymnasium (147); Easton, MA
March 7, 2024; 7:00 pm, NEC Front Row		Fairleigh Dickinson	L 56-70	9-20 (7-9)	William H. Detrick Gymnasium (362); New Britain, CT
Northeast Conference women's tournament
March 11, 2024; 7:00 p.m.	(5)	at (4) Merrimack; Quarterfinals	L 51-76	9-21	Hammel Court (319); North Andover, MA
*Non-conference game. ^{#}Rankings from AP Poll. (#) Tournament seedings in parentheses. All times are in Eastern.
