= WSKE =

- Everett, Pennsylvania; United States
- Broadcast area: Bedford, Pennsylvania; Bedford County, Pennsylvania
- Frequency: 104.3 MHz
- Branding: Cool Country 104.3

Programming
- Format: Country
- Affiliations: ABC News Radio

Ownership
- Owner: New Millennium Communications Group, Inc.

History
- First air date: March 15, 1988
- Former call signs: WSKE-FM (1987–2000)
- Call sign meaning: "Shorty King", nickname of the founding company's president, and Everett

Technical information
- Licensing authority: FCC
- Facility ID: 54571
- Class: A
- ERP: 820 Watts
- HAAT: 270 meters (890 ft)
- Transmitter coordinates: 40°0′11.0″N 78°23′58.0″W

Links
- Public license information: Public file; LMS

WSKE is a country formatted broadcast radio station licensed to Everett, Pennsylvania, serving Bedford and Bedford County in Pennsylvania. WSKE is owned and operated by New Millennium Communications Group, Inc. The station transmits from facilities off Black Valley Road on State Game Lands Number 97, about a mile outside of Everett.

== History ==
WSKE first went on the air on March 15, 1988, as WSKE-FM, the sister of an AM daytime-only station then operating at AM 1040, which had gone on the air 25 years before. The station, then owned by Radio Everett, Inc., was used primarily as a vehicle to provide listeners with radio service after the AM was mandated to shut down at sunset. This operation continued until 2002, a few months after Radio Everett president Melvin "Shorty King" Bakner sold both stations to Millennium Broadcasting, which has since been renamed as New Millennium Communications Group. Melvin Bakner's son Martin ("Marty King"), who had worked for the stations since his teenage years in the 1970s, continued working on-air until he was dropped from the staff in January 2002.

In 2002, the two stations, which had been simulcasting its longtime country format, were split into their own separate identities. The AM station, which had been renamed WZSK on May 3, 2000, adopted a news/talk format, while the FM retained the country format and the WSKE call letters.

Since the format split, New Millennium Communications Group has kept the station community-centered, focusing on Everett and Bedford County. WSKE operated from its longtime studio at 151 East First Avenue in Everett until 2022, when it was sold to a new owner. A pizzeria operates from this location today.
