= Tenley Park =

Coordinates: 40.020265°N 78.366805°W

Tenley Park is a community park in the town of Everett, Pennsylvania. It is a 77-acre (310,000 m^{2}) community park located in and owned by the Everett Borough. With many family hiking trails, a playground, geocaching and two pavilions, the park provides a great respite for individual, group and family outings.

== Origin and history ==
Information about Tenley Park's origin and early history has not yet been found.

The park contains a playground which was completed in August 2003 by the Everet Boro recreation board members and friends of the community.

== Current use ==
The Everett Recreation Board currently controls the use of Tenley Park.

The park and the pavilions provide a quiet atmosphere right next to town. People can hold family reunions or any approved event in the park, but must call the Borough office to reserve the pavilion according to the Everett Borough.

The park, as recently as 2015, has been used for events such as the Great American Backyard Campout and Paws in the Park, complemented by Tenley Park's use by the Mid State Trail. Here is an excerpt from the Appalachian Mountain Club:

After an 8-mile walk on the ridge, we descend into the town of Everett. Here, the beautiful, 77-acre Tenley Park offers free camping to MST users. The town is located in a valley of the Allegheny Mountains in a water gap carved by the Raystown Branch of the Juniata River.

The Recreation Board has also allowed geocaches to be placed within the park.

== Future use and development ==
Everett Borough Council approved permitted primitive camping for hikers in the park. Permission can be obtained through the Everett Borough office at (814) 652-9202 or through the Mid State Trail (Pennsylvania) website. Official trail maps will be published in the Tenley Park/Mid State Trail brochures by end of year 2013. The Everett Recreation Board is working on obtaining the remaining funds needed to complete an open-air amphitheater with stage and seating for 80-plus. This venue is to be completed by 2015 and will be available for concerts, educational outdoor classrooms and many more events for the surrounding communities.

== Images ==
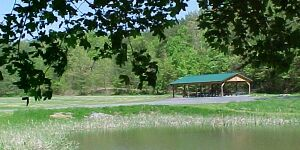
Pavilion at Tenley Park
