= WZSK =

- Everett, Pennsylvania; United States
- Broadcast area: Bedford, Pennsylvania; Somerset, Pennsylvania; Altoona, Pennsylvania; Cumberland, Maryland
- Frequency: 1040 kHz

Ownership
- Owner: New Millennium Communications Group, Inc.
- Sister stations: WSKE

History
- First air date: March 15, 1963
- Last air date: November 21, 2021 (license cancellation)
- Former call signs: WWDS (1963–1967); WSKE (1967–2000)

Technical information
- Facility ID: 54570
- Class: D
- Power: 10,000 watts (day); 4,000 watts (critical hours)
- Transmitter coordinates: 40°0′26.0″N 78°21′44.0″W

WZSK (1030 AM) was a daytime-only commercial radio station licensed to Everett, Pennsylvania, United States, serving Bedford, Somerset, and Altoona in Pennsylvania and Cumberland in Maryland. WZSK was last owned and operated by New Millennium Communications Group, Inc., and last featured a talk radio format.

== History ==
=== Beginnings ===
The groundwork for WZSK was first laid in 1962. Known then as WWDS, founders Dennis and Willard Sleighter first applied for its construction permit in November 1962. The station first operated at a Federal Communications Commission (FCC) assigned frequency of 1050 kHz, with a maximum output power of 250 watts. The station went on the air March 15, 1963 from its longtime facilities along East First Avenue in Everett.

In August 1964, the Sleighters applied for a construction permit to move WWDS's dial position from 1050 kHz to 1110 kHz and increase its power to 5,000 watts. The FCC denied the permit in March 1967. Shortly after, the Sleighters sold the station to the Bakner family, who would control the station over the next three decades.

=== Sale to Bakner Family ===
Melvin Bakner, known by his on-air name "Shorty King", formed Radio Everett, Inc. and acquired WSKE in July 1967. The call letters were changed to WSKE in November of that same year. Under Bakner's direction, the station boasted a country format, which became popular with local listeners. In 1979, WSKE applied for a power increase to 1,000 watts and installed a directional antenna system. Melvin Bakner's son Martin ("Marty King"), who had worked for the stations since his teenage years in the 1970s, continued working on-air until he was dropped from the staff in January 2002.

WSKE petitioned for a frequency change again in the 1980s, and in 1983 was granted a move to 1040 kHz and a power increase to 10,000 watts daytime and 4,000 watts, critical hours.

On April 27, 1987, Radio Everett, Inc. successfully applied for an FM license at 104.3 mHz. That station, operational beginning on March 15, 1988, became known as WSKE-FM and became a full simulcast of its then-same-named AM sister. The station allowed Everett to have local radio service after WSKE was required to sign off after local sunset. The FM broadcast 18 hours a day at that time. The AM station petitioned for and was granted a change of call letters to WZSK on May 3, 2000.

=== Sale to New Millennium Communications Group ===
The stations were sold to New Millennium Communications Group in 2001. In 2002, the two stations, which had been simulcasting its longtime country format, were split into their own separate identities. The AM station took on a news-talk format, while the FM retained the country format and the WSKE call letters.

In 2010, New Millennium Communications Group applied for Special Temporary Authority (STA) for WZSK to operate at reduced power due to technical problems with the station's aging transmitter. The FCC granted permission in April 2010 to allow the station to operate at reduced power until October of that same year .

=== Decline and Failure ===
On March 26, 2021, the FCC informed New Millennium Communications Group in writing that a complaint had been filed by an individual in October 2020 claiming that the station had been silent for more than a year. The same correspondence revealed that an additional complaint had been received earlier in the month of March 2021. The FCC further requested that New Millennium submit evidence that the station was operating since October 1, 2019, including photographic evidence of the station's studio and transmission facilities and coordinates for the transmitter site . A follow-up letter was sent less than 60 days later .

New Millennium Communications Group President Shane Imler responded to FCC attorney Victoria McCauley in correspondence dated June 8, 2021. Imler stated that revenues for the stations were 'up and down since the (COVID-19) pandemic', implying a state of hardship. However, he did give assurance that WSKE remained in full operation. Imler stated that repairs were being made to the main transmitter and a backup that was being used was not reliable .

FCC officials responded in its final correspondence of November 18, 2021 that Imler's letter failed to address proof of the station's operation as previously requested. As a result, WZSK's license was cancelled by the FCC on November 18, 2021, due to the station having been silent for more than a year.
