= 2023–24 Wagner Seahawks women's basketball team =

American college basketball season

2023–24 Wagner Seahawks women's basketball
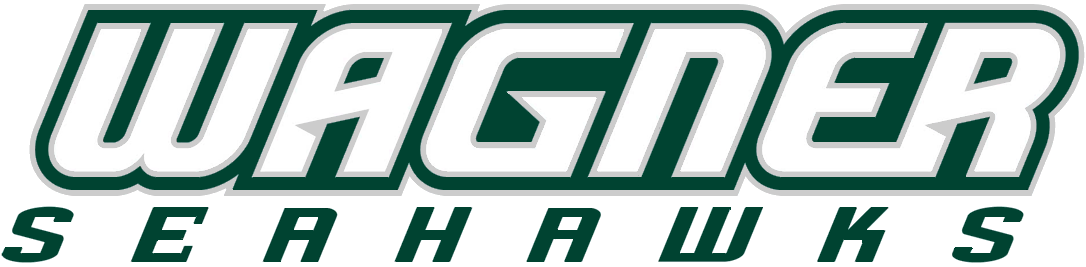
- Conference: Northeast Conference
- Record: 7–21 (4–12 NEC)
- Head coach: Terrell Coburn (3rd season)
- Assistant coaches: Alycia Gervais; TiAna Jones; Alexis Lloyd
- Home arena: Spiro Sports Center

2023–24 Northeast Conference women's basketball standings
	Conf.				Overall
Team	W		L	PCT	W		L	PCT
Sacred Heart †	15	–	1	.938	24	–	10	.706
Le Moyne*	14	–	2	.875	18	–	15	.545
Fairleigh Dickinson	11	–	5	.688	14	–	17	.452
Merrimack	8	–	8	.500	12	–	19	.387
Central Connecticut	7	–	9	.438	9	–	21	.300
LIU	5	–	11	.313	8	–	22	.267
Stonehill*	4	–	12	.250	4	–	26	.133
Saint Francis	4	–	12	.250	5	–	25	.167
Wagner	4	–	12	.250	7	–	21	.250
† 2024 NEC tournament winner * ineligible for the 2024 NCAA tournament due to transition period

The 2023–24 Wagner Seahawks women's basketball team represented Wagner College during the 2023–24 NCAA Division I women's basketball season. The Seahawks, who were led by third-year head coach Terrell Coburn, played their home games at the Spiro Sports Center in Staten Island, New York as members of the Northeast Conference.

== Previous season ==
The Seahawks finished the 2022–23 season 13–15, 8–8 in NEC play to finish in fifth place. They were defeated by St. Francis Brooklyn in the quarterfinals of the NEC tournament.

== Roster ==
2023–24 Wagner Seahawks women's basketball team
Players
Coaches

Pos.	#	Name	Height	Year	Previous school	Hometown
G	0	Taleah Washington	5 ft 7 in (1.7 m)	GS	Old Dominion	District Heights, Maryland
G	1	Rakisha Ballinger	5 ft 8 in (1.73 m)	Jr	Emerge Christian Academy	Hyattsville, Maryland
G	2	Semie Brar	5 ft 4 in (1.63 m)	Jr	Laney College	Fresno, California
G/F	3	Brittney-Shania Etuka	6 ft 1 in (1.85 m)	Jr	Hartford	Brampton, Ontario
G	4	Paige Lyons	5 ft 6 in (1.68 m)	Jr	East Carolina	Atlanta, Georgia
G/F	10	Shamique Cummings	6 ft 0 in (1.83 m)	Fr	Champlain College Saint-Lambert	Montreal, Quebec
F	11	Malia Mpondo	6 ft 2 in (1.88 m)	So	International School of Geneva	Founex, Switzerland
G	13	Marisa Sanchez-Henry	5 ft 4 in (1.63 m)	Sr	Howard High School	Ellicott City, Maryland
G	14	Angélie Ricard	5 ft 10 in (1.78 m)	So	Cégep de Saint-Jean-sur-Richelieu	Orford, Quebec
G	15	Drew Jordon	5 ft 11 in (1.8 m)	Fr	Bishop McNamara High School	Washington, D.C.
F	21	Kiera Edmonds	6 ft 2 in (1.88 m)	Fr	Brooklyn & Law Tech	Brooklyn, New York
F	22	Maite Lara Garcia	6 ft 1 in (1.85 m)	Sr	IES Jaume Salvador i Pedrol	Sant Joan Despí, Spain
G	23	Julia Fabozzi	6 ft 1 in (1.85 m)	Sr	Providence	Staten Island, New York
G/F	24	Cyan Dyke	5 ft 11 in (1.8 m)	Sr	Furman	Los Angeles, California
C	30	Lijirin Doyinsola Modesayor	6 ft 3 in (1.91 m)	Fr	Topfield Secondary School	Ondo State, Nigeria

Head coach

- Terrell Coburn (Central Arkansas)

Assistant coach(es)

- Alycia Gervais (Daniel Webster)
- TiAna Jones (Drexel)
- Alexis Lloyd (USC)

Legend

- (C) Team captain
- (S) Suspended
- (I) Ineligible
- (W) Walk-on
- Injured
- Current redshirt

Roster
Last update: March 12, 2024

== Schedule and results ==
Date time, TV	Rank^{#}	Opponent^{#}	Result	Record	Site (attendance) city, state
Exhibition
November 6, 2023*; 7:00 pm		CCNY	W 118–13	–	Spiro Sports Center (15); Staten Island, NY
Non-conference regular season
November 9, 2023*; 7:00 pm, B1G+		at Rutgers	L 43–86	0–1	Jersey Mike's Arena (1,688); Piscataway, NJ
November 12, 2023*; 2:00 pm, FloHoops		at Hofstra	L 48–51 ^{OT}	0–2	Mack Sports Complex (407); Hempstead, NY
November 18, 2023*; 1:00 pm, ESPN+		at NJIT	L 36–80	0–3	Wellness and Events Center (272); Newark, NJ
November 21, 2023*; 8:00 pm, FloHoops		at Northeastern	L 46–63	0–4	Cabot Center (239); Boston, MA
November 27, 2023*; 7:00 pm, NEC Front Row		Iona	L 55–67	0–5	Spiro Sports Center (453); Staten Island, NY
November 30, 2023*; 7:00 pm, NEC Front Row		Navy	W 69–67	1–5	Spiro Sports Center (430); Staten Island, NY
December 6, 2023*; 7:00 pm, ESPN+		at Saint Peter's	W 69–67	2–5	Run Baby Run Arena (394); Jersey City, NJ
December 10, 2023*; 2:00 pm, ESPN+		at Columbia	L 50–79	2–6	Levien Gymnasium (924); New York, NY
December 16, 2023*; 4:00 pm, NEC Front Row		Maryland Eastern Shore	L 50–72	2–7	Spiro Sports Center (264); Staten Island, NY
December 20, 2023*; 1:00 pm, ESPN+		vs. UAB; Hawk Classic	L 39–79	2–8	Hagan Arena (113); Philadelphia, PA
December 21, 2023*; 11:00 am, ESPN+		vs. New Hampshire; Hawk Classic	L 52–73	2–9	Hagan Arena (127); Philadelphia, PA
December 30, 2023*; 4:00 pm, NEC Front Row		Saint Elizabeth	W 83–50	3–9	Spiro Sports Center (269); Staten Island, NY
NEC regular season
January 6, 2024; 4:00 pm, NEC Front Row		at Saint Francis	L 54–64	3–10 (0–1)	DeGol Arena (37); Loretto, PA
January 8, 2024; 7:00 pm, NEC Front Row		LIU	W 75–66	4–10 (1–1)	Spiro Sports Center (487); Staten Island, NY
January 15, 2024; 2:00 pm, NEC Front Row		at Stonehill	L 44–67	4–11 (1–2)	Merkert Gymnasium (387); Easton, MA
January 19, 2024; 12:00 pm, NEC Front Row		Merrimack	L 45–72	4–12 (1–3)	Spiro Sports Center (1,309); Staten Island, NY
January 21, 2024; 4:00 pm, NEC Front Row		Sacred Heart	L 63–83	4–13 (1–4)	Spiro Sports Center (483); Staten Island, NY
January 27, 2024; 4:00 pm, NEC Front Row		Central Connecticut	W 49–45	5–13 (2–4)	Spiro Sports Center (577); Staten Island, NY
February 1, 2024; 7:00 pm, NEC Front Row		at Le Moyne	L 45–56	5–14 (2–5)	Ted Grant Court (410); DeWitt, NY
February 3, 2024; 4:00 pm, NEC Front Row		Stonehill	W 63–55	6–14 (3–5)	Spiro Sports Center (623); Staten Island, NY
February 9, 2024; 7:00 pm, ESPNU/ESPN+		at Fairleigh Dickinson	L 53–62	6–15 (3–6)	Bogota Savings Bank Center (253); Hackensack, NJ
February 15, 2024; 7:00 pm, NEC Front Row		Saint Francis	L 60–76	6–16 (3–7)	Spiro Sports Center (379); Staten Island, NY
February 17, 2024; 2:00 pm, NEC Front Row/SNY		at Sacred Heart	L 55–79	6–17 (3–8)	William H. Pitt Center (525); Fairfield, CT
February 22, 2024; 7:00 pm, NEC Front Row		at Central Connecticut	L 61–69	6–18 (3–9)	William H. Detrick Gymnasium (373); New Britain, CT
February 24, 2024; 2:00 pm, NEC Front Row		at LIU	L 65–70 ^{OT}	6–19 (3–10)	Steinberg Wellness Center (–); Brooklyn, NY
February 29, 2024; 7:00 pm, ESPN+		Le Moyne	L 46–55	6–20 (3–11)	Spiro Sports Center (518); Staten Island, NY
March 2, 2024; 2:00 pm, NEC Front Row		Fairleigh Dickinson	L 51–59	6–21 (3–12)	Spiro Sports Center (853); Staten Island, NY
March 7, 2024; 3:00 pm, NEC Front Row		at Merrimack	W 79–65	7–21 (4–12)	Hammel Court (167); North Andover, MA
*Non-conference game. ^{#}Rankings from AP Poll. (#) Tournament seedings in parentheses. All times are in Eastern.
