= 2023–24 Sacred Heart Pioneers women's basketball team =

Intercollegiate basketball season

2023–24 Sacred Heart Pioneers women's basketball

NEC regular-season and tournament champions

NCAA tournament, First Four
- Conference: Northeast Conference
- Record: 24–10 (15–1 NEC)
- Head coach: Jessica Mannetti (11th season)
- Assistant coaches: Liz Flooks; Candice Leatherwood; Marc Taney
- Home arena: William H. Pitt Center

2023–24 Northeast Conference women's basketball standings
	Conf.				Overall
Team	W		L	PCT	W		L	PCT
Sacred Heart †	15	–	1	.938	24	–	10	.706
Le Moyne*	14	–	2	.875	18	–	15	.545
Fairleigh Dickinson	11	–	5	.688	14	–	17	.452
Merrimack	8	–	8	.500	12	–	19	.387
Central Connecticut	7	–	9	.438	9	–	21	.300
LIU	5	–	11	.313	8	–	22	.267
Stonehill*	4	–	12	.250	4	–	26	.133
Saint Francis	4	–	12	.250	5	–	25	.167
Wagner	4	–	12	.250	7	–	21	.250
† 2024 NEC tournament winner * ineligible for the 2024 NCAA tournament due to transition period

The 2023–24 Sacred Heart Pioneers women's basketball team represented Sacred Heart University (SHU) during the 2023–24 NCAA Division I women's basketball season. The Pioneers, led by 11th-year head coach Jessica Mannetti, played their home games at the William H. Pitt Center in Fairfield, Connecticut as members of the Northeast Conference (NEC).

The Pioneers finished the season 24–10, 15–1 in NEC play, to finish as NEC regular-season champions. They defeated Saint Francis, Merrimack and Le Moyne to win the NEC tournament championship for the second year in a row, and, in turn, earned the NEC's automatic bid to the NCAA tournament. They received the #16 seed in the Albany Regional 1, where they were defeated by Presbyterian in the First Four.

This was the Pioneers' final season in the NEC. On October 25, 2023, SHU and the Metro Atlantic Athletic Conference jointly announced that the university would join that conference on July 1, 2024.

== Offseason ==
=== Departures ===
Name	Number	Pos.	Height	Year	Hometown	Reason for departure
Wil'Lisha Jackson	5	G/F	5' 8"	SR	Rahway, NJ	Graduated
Maya Klein	12	G	5' 6"	GS	Stamford, CT	Graduated
Savannah Marshall	33	G	5' 8"	SR	Westbrook, CT	Graduated
Carly Stroemel	13	F/C	6' 2"	SR	Voorhees, NJ	Graduated

=== Incoming transfers ===
Name	Number	Pos.	Height	Year	Hometown	Previous school
Faith Pappas	5	G	5' 11"	SO	Long Valley, NJ	Fordham

== Roster ==
2023–24 Sacred Heart Pioneers women's basketball team
Players
Coaches

Pos.	#	Name	Height	Year	Previous school	Hometown
G	0	Montana Nicks	5 ft 6 in (1.68 m)	Fr	Dwight-Englewood School	Englewood, NJ
G	1	Ny'Ceara Pryor	5 ft 3 in (1.6 m)	So	Western	Baltimore, MD
G	2	Thai Davis	5 ft 6 in (1.68 m)	Fr	Beaver Country Day School	Stoughton, MA
G	3	Amelia Wood	6 ft 0 in (1.83 m)	So	Averill Park	Wynantskill, NY
G	4	Nalyce Dudley	5 ft 6 in (1.68 m)	Fr	New London	Norwich, CT
G	5	Faith Pappas	5 ft 11 in (1.8 m)	So	Pope John XXIII Regional/Fordham	Long Valley, NJ
G	10	Afia Owusu Mensah	5 ft 8 in (1.73 m)	Jr	Glenn Dale, MD
G	15	Emma Kirby	6 ft 2 in (1.88 m)	Fr	Tatnall School	Chadds Ford, PA
F	22	Ciara Brannon	6 ft 1 in (1.85 m)	Sr	Westampton Tech/Wagner	Westampton, NJ
G	23	Sajada Bonner	6 ft 0 in (1.83 m)	GS	St. John Vianney/Quinnipiac	Cliffwood, NJ
G	24	Sierra Johnson	5 ft 8 in (1.73 m)	So	TPLS Christian Academy	Richmond, VA
G	30	Olivia Tucker	5 ft 8 in (1.73 m)	GS	Sanford School/St. Bonaventure	Newark, DE
F/C	34	Kelsey Wood	6 ft 1 in (1.85 m)	Sr	Averill Park	Wynantskill, NY

Head coach

- Jessica Mannetti (Concordia College)

Assistant coach(es)

Legend

- (C) Team captain
- (S) Suspended
- (I) Ineligible
- (W) Walk-on
- Injured
- Current redshirt

Roster
Last update: September 15, 2024

== Schedule ==
Date time, TV	Rank^{#}	Opponent^{#}	Result	Record	Site (attendance) city, state
Non-conference regular season
November 7, 2023*; 6:00 p.m., ESPN+		at Rhode Island	L 40–91	0–1	Ryan Center (1,260); Kingston, RI
November 11, 2023*; 2:00 p.m.		at Morgan State	W 63–55	1–1	Talmadge L. Hill Field House; Baltimore, MD
November 15, 2023*; 7:00 p.m., FloHoops		at Monmouth	W 59–50	2–1	OceanFirst Bank Center (577); West Long Branch, NJ
November 19, 2023*; 2:00 p.m., NEC Front Row		Hofstra	W 63–60	3–1	William H. Pitt Center (683); Fairfield, CT
November 23, 2023*; 9:00 p.m.		University of Puerto Rico–Mayagüez; San Juan Shootout	W 73–42	4–1	José Miguel Agrelot Coliseum (250); San Juan, Puerto Rico
November 24, 2023*; 6:30 p.m., FloHoops		VCU; San Juan Shootout	L 62–76	4–2	José Miguel Agrelot Coliseum (250); San Juan, Puerto Rico
November 25, 2023*; 6:30 p.m., FloHoops		UCF; San Juan Shootout	L 58–69	4–3	José Miguel Agrelot Coliseum; San Juan, Puerto Rico
November 29, 2023*; 7:00 p.m., SNY		Fairfield	L 61–66 ^{OT}	4–4	William H. Pitt Center (788); Fairfield, CT
December 2, 2023*; 2:00 p.m., ESPN+		at Bryant	L 71–74 ^{OT}	4–5	Chace Athletic Center (225); Smithfield, RI
December 6, 2023*; 7:00 p.m., NEC Front Row		NJIT	W 57–48	5–5	William H. Pitt Center (402); Fairfield, CT
December 10, 2023*; 12:00 p.m., ESPN+		at Iona	L 50–60	5–6	Hynes Athletic Center (1,021); New Rochelle, NY
December 16, 2023*; 5:00 p.m., FloSports		at Providence	L 35–66	5–7	Alumni Hall (584); Providence, RI
December 20, 2023*; 11:00 a.m., ESPN+		at Vermont	L 64–70	5–8	Patrick Gym (904); Burlington, VT
December 31, 2023*; 1:00 p.m., NEC Front Row		Mercy	W 73–41	6–8	William H. Pitt Center; Fairfield, CT
Northeast Conference regular season
January 6, 2024; 2:00 p.m., ESPN+		Merrimack	W 65–51	7–8 (1–0)	William H Pitt Center; Fairfield, CT
January 8, 2024; 7:00 p.m.		at Saint Francis	W 86–47	8–8 (2–0)	DeGol Arena (83); Loretto, PA
January 13, 2024; 2:00 p.m.		at LIU	W 67–56	9–8 (3–0)	Steinberg Wellness Center; Brooklyn, NY
January 15, 2024; 2:00 p.m., NEC Front Row		Le Moyne	L 56–60	9–9 (3–1)	William H Pitt Center (442); Fairfield, CT
January 21, 2024; 4:00 p.m.		at Wagner	W 83–63	10–9 (4–1)	Spiro Sports Center (483); Staten Island, NY
January 25, 2024; 7:00 p.m., NEC Front Row		LIU	W 70–55	11–9 (5–1)	William H Pitt Center; Fairfield, CT
January 27, 2024; 2:00 p.m., NEC Front Row		Fairleigh Dickinson	W 68–51	12–9 (6–1)	William H Pitt Center (864); Fairfield, CT
February 1, 2024; 6:00 p.m., NEC Front Row		at Stonehill	W 80–53	13–9 (7–1)	Merkert Gymnasium (381); Easton, MA
February 3, 2024; 2:00 p.m., NEC Front Row		at Le Moyne	W 73–55	14–9 (8–1)	Ted Grant Court (403); DeWitt, NY
February 9, 2024; 7:00 p.m., NEC Front Row		Central Connecticut	W 58–53	15–9 (9–1)	William H Pitt Center (512); Fairfield, CT
February 17, 2024; 2:00 p.m., SNY		Wagner	W 79–55	16–9 (10–1)	William H Pitt Center (525); Fairfield, CT
February 22, 2024; 7:00 p.m.		at Fairleigh Dickinson	W 75–63	17–9 (11–1)	Bogota Savings Bank Center (405); Teaneck, NJ
February 24, 2024; 1:00 p.m.		at Central Connecticut	W 73–55	18–9 (12–1)	William H. Detrick Gymnasium (459); New Britain, CT
February 29, 2024; 7:00 p.m., NEC Front Row		Stonehill	W 78–49	19–9 (13–1)	William H Pitt Center (441); Fairfield, CT
March 2, 2024; 3:00 p.m., ESPN+		at Merrimack	W 64–51	20–9 (14–1)	Hammel Court; North Andover, MA
March 7, 2024; 11:00 a.m., NEC Front Row		Saint Francis	W 76–47	21–9 (15–1)	William H Pitt Center (1,502); Fairfield, CT
Northeast Conference women's tournament
March 11, 2024; 7:00 p.m., NEC Front Row	(1)	(8) Saint Francis; Quarterfinals	W 78–48	22–9	William H. Pitt Center (298); Fairfield, CT
March 14, 2024; 7:00 p.m., ESPN+	(1)	(3) Merrimack; Semifinals	W 73–41	23–9	William H. Pitt Center (464); Fairfield, CT
March 17, 2024; 12:00 p.m., ESPNU	(1)	(2) Le Moyne; Championship	W 69–48	24–9	William H. Pitt Center (1,467); Fairfield, CT
NCAA women's tournament
March 20, 2024*; 7:00 p.m., ESPNU	(16 A1)	vs. (16 A1) Presbyterian; First Four	L 42–49	24–10	Colonial Life Arena (1,196); Columbia, SC
*Non-conference game. ^{#}Rankings from AP poll. (#) Tournament seedings in parentheses. All times are in Eastern.
