= 2023–24 Fairleigh Dickinson Knights women's basketball team =

American college basketball season

2023–24 Fairleigh Dickinson Knights women's basketball
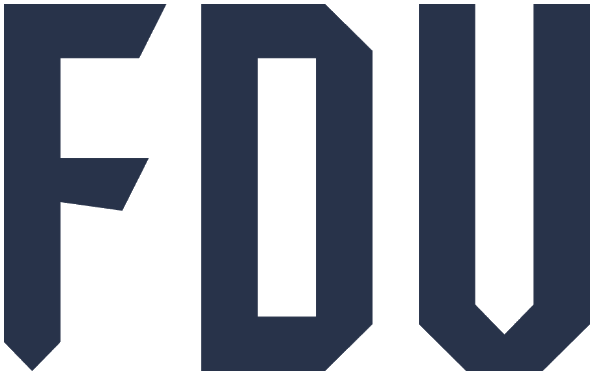
- Conference: Northeast Conference
- Record: 14–16 (11–5 NEC)
- Head coach: Stephanie Gaitley (1st season)
- Associate head coach: Jessica Simmonds
- Assistant coaches: Jeremy Thompson; Madison Stanley; Ty Rozier
- Home arena: Bogota Savings Bank Center

2023–24 Northeast Conference women's basketball standings
	Conf.				Overall
Team	W		L	PCT	W		L	PCT
Sacred Heart †	15	–	1	.938	24	–	10	.706
Le Moyne*	14	–	2	.875	18	–	15	.545
Fairleigh Dickinson	11	–	5	.688	14	–	17	.452
Merrimack	8	–	8	.500	12	–	19	.387
Central Connecticut	7	–	9	.438	9	–	21	.300
LIU	5	–	11	.313	8	–	22	.267
Stonehill*	4	–	12	.250	4	–	26	.133
Saint Francis	4	–	12	.250	5	–	25	.167
Wagner	4	–	12	.250	7	–	21	.250
† 2024 NEC tournament winner * ineligible for the 2024 NCAA tournament due to transition period

The 2023–24 Fairleigh Dickinson Knights women's basketball team represented Fairleigh Dickinson University during the 2023–24 NCAA Division I women's basketball season. The Knights, led by first-year head coach Stephanie Gaitley, played their home games in Hackensack, New Jersey as members of the Northeast Conference (NEC). During the season, on January 18, the name of the Knights' home venue was changed from the Rothman Center to the Bogota Savings Bank Center.

== Previous season ==
The Knights finished the 2022–23 season 24–8, 14–2 in NEC play, to finish as NEC regular season champions. In the NEC tournament, they defeated Central Connecticut in the quarterfinals, and St. Francis Brooklyn in the semifinals, before falling in the championship game to Sacred Heart. They received an automatic bid into the WNIT, where they would fall to eventual tournament runner-up Columbia in the first round. On April 16, the school announced that head coach Angelika Szumilo would be departing the program, after four seasons at the helm. On April 21, the school announced the hiring of former Fordham and Ocean City High School head coach Stephanie Gaitley as the Knights' next head coach.

== Roster ==
2023–24 Fairleigh Dickinson Knights women's basketball team
Players
Coaches

Pos.	#	Name	Height	Year	Previous school	Hometown
G	0	Ciera Cevallos	5 ft 7 in (1.7 m)	Fr	Immaculate Conception HS	Maplewood, NJ
G	1	Staci Williams	5 ft 8 in (1.73 m)	Fr	Holly Springs HS	Holly Springs, NC
G	2	Wilma Sorensen	5 ft 11 in (1.8 m)	Fr	Marks Gymnasieskola	Borås, Sweden
F	3	Bella Toomey	5 ft 11 in (1.8 m)	Fr	Penn Charter	Philadelphia, PA
G	4	Mia Andrews	5 ft 9 in (1.75 m)	Sr	Chipola College	Willow Grove, PA
G	10	Dominique García Blackwood	5 ft 10 in (1.78 m)	So	IES Los Tarahale	Las Palmas, Spain
G	11	Abby Conklin	5 ft 7 in (1.7 m)	Sr	Irvington HS	Irvington, NY
G	13	Abaigeal Babore	5 ft 6 in (1.68 m)	Sr	Eckerd College	Merchantville, NJ
G	14	Nickie Carter	5 ft 7 in (1.7 m)	GS	Montclair State	Flemington, NJ
F/C	20	Teneisia Brown	6 ft 2 in (1.88 m)	Sr	Merrimack	Montego Bay, Jamaica
G	21	Rebecca Osei-Owusu	5 ft 11 in (1.8 m)	Fr	Monsignor Scanlan HS	Brooklyn, NY
G	22	Jada Elston	5 ft 7 in (1.7 m)	Fr	Middle Township HS	Woodbine, NJ
G	33	Allie McGinn	5 ft 11 in (1.8 m)	Jr	Staten Island Academy	Staten Island, NY
F	45	Lilly Parke	6 ft 2 in (1.88 m)	So	Auburn Montgomery	Auckland, New Zealand

Head coach

- Stephanie Gaitley (Villanova)

Assistant coach(es)

- Jessica Simmonds (George Washington)
- Jeremy Thompson (Muhlenberg)
- Madison Stanley (Fairleigh Dickinson)
- Ty Rozier (Fordham)

Legend

- (C) Team captain
- (S) Suspended
- (I) Ineligible
- (W) Walk-on
- Injured
- Current redshirt

Roster
Last update: March 12, 2024

== Schedule and results ==
Date time, TV	Rank^{#}	Opponent^{#}	Result	Record	Site (attendance) city, state
Exhibition
October 28, 2023*; 4:00 p.m.		Molloy	W 75–56	–	Bogota Savings Bank Center (82); Hackensack, NJ
Non-conference regular season
November 6, 2023*; 7:30 p.m., B1G+		at No. 3 Iowa	L 46–102	0–1	Carver–Hawkeye Arena (14,998); Iowa City, IA
November 12, 2023*; 1:00 p.m., ESPN+		at Army	L 63–71	0–2	Christl Arena (596); West Point, NY
November 15, 2023*; 11:00 a.m., ESPN+		at Bucknell	L 44–49	0–3	Sojka Pavilion (1,267); Lewisburg, PA
November 17, 2023*; 7:00 p.m., FloHoops		at Georgetown	L 45–60	0–4	McDonough Arena (283); Washington, D.C.
November 22, 2023*; 12:00 p.m., NEC Front Row		Mount St. Mary's	L 50–64	0–5	Bogota Savings Bank Center (150); Hackensack, NJ
November 26, 2023*; 2:00 p.m., NEC Front Row		Rider	W 64–59	1–5	Bogota Savings Bank Center (327); Hackensack, NJ
November 29, 2023*; 7:00 p.m., YES		NJIT	L 46–61	1–6	Bogota Savings Bank Center (187); Hackensack, NJ
December 2, 2023*; 7:00 p.m., NEC Front Row		American	L 57–63	1–7	Bogota Savings Bank Center (167); Hackensack, NJ
December 6, 2023*; 7:00 p.m., NEC Front Row		Bloomfield	W 86–38	2–7	Bogota Savings Bank Center (54); Hackensack, NJ
December 9, 2023*; 2:00 p.m.		at Maryland Eastern Shore	L 47–54	2–8	Hytche Athletic Center (183); Princess Anne, MD
December 11, 2023*; 7:00 p.m., FloHoops		at Seton Hall	L 27–67	2–9	Walsh Gymnasium (681); South Orange, NJ
December 21, 2023*; 12:30 p.m., YES		UNLV	L 59–71	2–10	Bogota Savings Bank Center (475); Hackensack, NJ
December 29, 2023*; 7:30 p.m., SECN+		at Vanderbilt	L 41–73	2–11	Memorial Gymnasium (1,960); Nashville, TN
NEC regular season
January 6, 2024; 2:00 p.m., NEC Front Row		at Le Moyne	L 52–65	2–12 (0–1)	Ted Grant Court (268); DeWitt, NY
January 8, 2024; 7:00 p.m., NEC Front Row		Merrimack	W 67–51	3–12 (1–1)	Bogota Savings Bank Center (113); Hackensack, NJ
January 13, 2024; 2:00 p.m., NEC Front Row		at Stonehill	L 56–60	3–13 (1–2)	Merkert Gymnasium (416); Easton, MA
January 15, 2024; 2:00 p.m., NEC Front Row		Saint Francis	W 64–54	4–13 (2–2)	Bogota Savings Bank Center (202); Hackensack, NJ
January 19, 2024; 7:00 p.m., NEC Front Row		Stonehill	W 61–50	5–13 (3–2)	Bogota Savings Bank Center (130); Hackensack, NJ
January 25, 2024; 8:00 p.m., NEC Front Row		Central Connecticut	W 80–75 ^{OT}	6–13 (4–2)	Bogota Savings Bank Center (113); Hackensack, NJ
January 27, 2024; 2:00 p.m., NEC Front Row		at Sacred Heart	L 51–68	6–14 (4–3)	William H. Pitt Center (864); Fairfield, CT
February 1, 2024; 7:00 p.m., ESPN+		at LIU	W 59–56	7–14 (5–3)	Steinberg Wellness Center (130); Brooklyn, NY
February 9, 2024; 7:00 p.m., ESPNU/ESPN+		Wagner	W 62–53	8–14 (6–3)	Bogota Savings Bank Center (253); Hackensack, NJ
February 15, 2024; 7:00 p.m., NEC Front Row		LIU	W 84–53	9–14 (7–3)	Bogota Savings Bank Center (207); Hackensack, NJ
February 17, 2024; 4:00 p.m., NEC Front Row		at Saint Francis	W 68–48	10–14 (8–3)	DeGol Arena (464); Loretto, PA
February 22, 2024; 7:00 p.m., NEC Front Row		Sacred Heart	L 63–75	10–15 (8–4)	Bogota Savings Bank Center (405); Hackensack, NJ
February 24, 2024; 2:00 p.m., NEC Front Row		Le Moyne	L 60–70	10–16 (8–5)	Bogota Savings Bank Center (234); Hackensack, NJ
February 29, 2024; 7:00 p.m., NEC Front Row		at Merrimack	W 71–63	11–16 (9–5)	Hammel Court (618); North Andover, MA
March 2, 2024; 2:00 p.m., NEC Front Row		at Wagner	W 59–51	12–16 (10–5)	Spiro Sports Center (853); Staten Island, NY
March 7, 2024; 7:00 p.m., NEC Front Row		at Central Connecticut	W 70–56	13–16 (11–5)	William H. Detrick Gymnasium (362); New Britain, CT
NEC tournament
March 11, 2024; 7:00 p.m., NEC Front Row	(3)	(6) LIU; Quarterfinals	W 71–59	14–16	Bogota Savings Bank Center (677); Hackensack, NJ
March 14, 2024; 7:00 p.m., YES/ESPN+	(3)	at (2) Le Moyne; Semifinals	L 38-52	14-17	Ted Grant Court; DeWitt, NY
*Non-conference game. ^{#}Rankings from AP poll. (#) Tournament seedings in parentheses. All times are in Eastern.
