= Everett, Pennsylvania =

Borough in Pennsylvania, US

- Borough
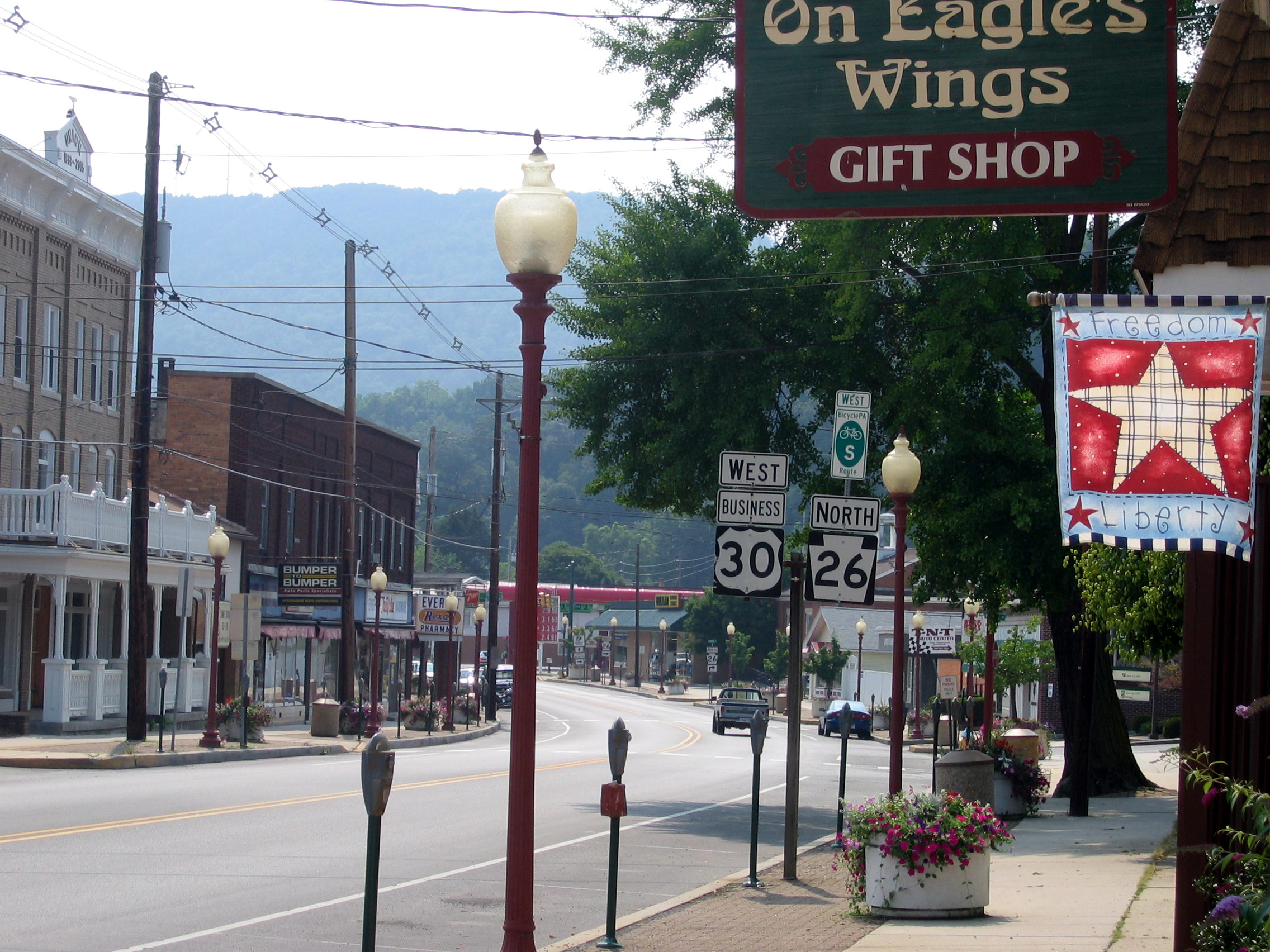
- Main Street in Everett

- Location of Everett in Bedford County, Pennsylvania.

- Location within Pennsylvania
- Coordinates: 40°00′51″N 78°22′24″W
- Country: United States
- State: Pennsylvania
- County: Bedford
- Settled: 1795
- Incorporated: 1860

Government
  - Type: Borough Council

Area
  - Total: 1.06 sq mi (2.74 km^{2})
  - Land: 0.98 sq mi (2.54 km^{2})
  - Water: 0.081 sq mi (0.21 km^{2})
- Elevation: 1,237 ft (377 m)

Population (2020)
  - Total: 1,765
  - Density: 1,800.7/sq mi (695.26/km^{2})
- Time zone: UTC-5 (Eastern (EST))
  - Summer (DST): UTC-4 (EDT)
- Zip code: 15537
- Area code: 814
- FIPS code: 42-24304
- Website: http://everettboro.com

Everett is a borough in Bedford County, Pennsylvania, United States. The population was 1,765 at the 2020 census.

Everett's original name was Bloody Run, after a creek that was the site of a battle between settlers and Native Americans. The town was renamed in honor of Massachusetts politician and orator Edward Everett.

== History ==
In 1787, Michael Barndollar purchased the land in this area, and laid out a town which was originally called Waynesburg.

This name was never widely used and this small village was incorporated as a borough in November 1860, to be known as Bloody Run. While this name carries with it many interesting stories and much history, the name was changed in February 1873 to Everett.

The Everett Historic District was added to the National Register of Historic Places in 2003.

Mural on building along Main Street in Everett

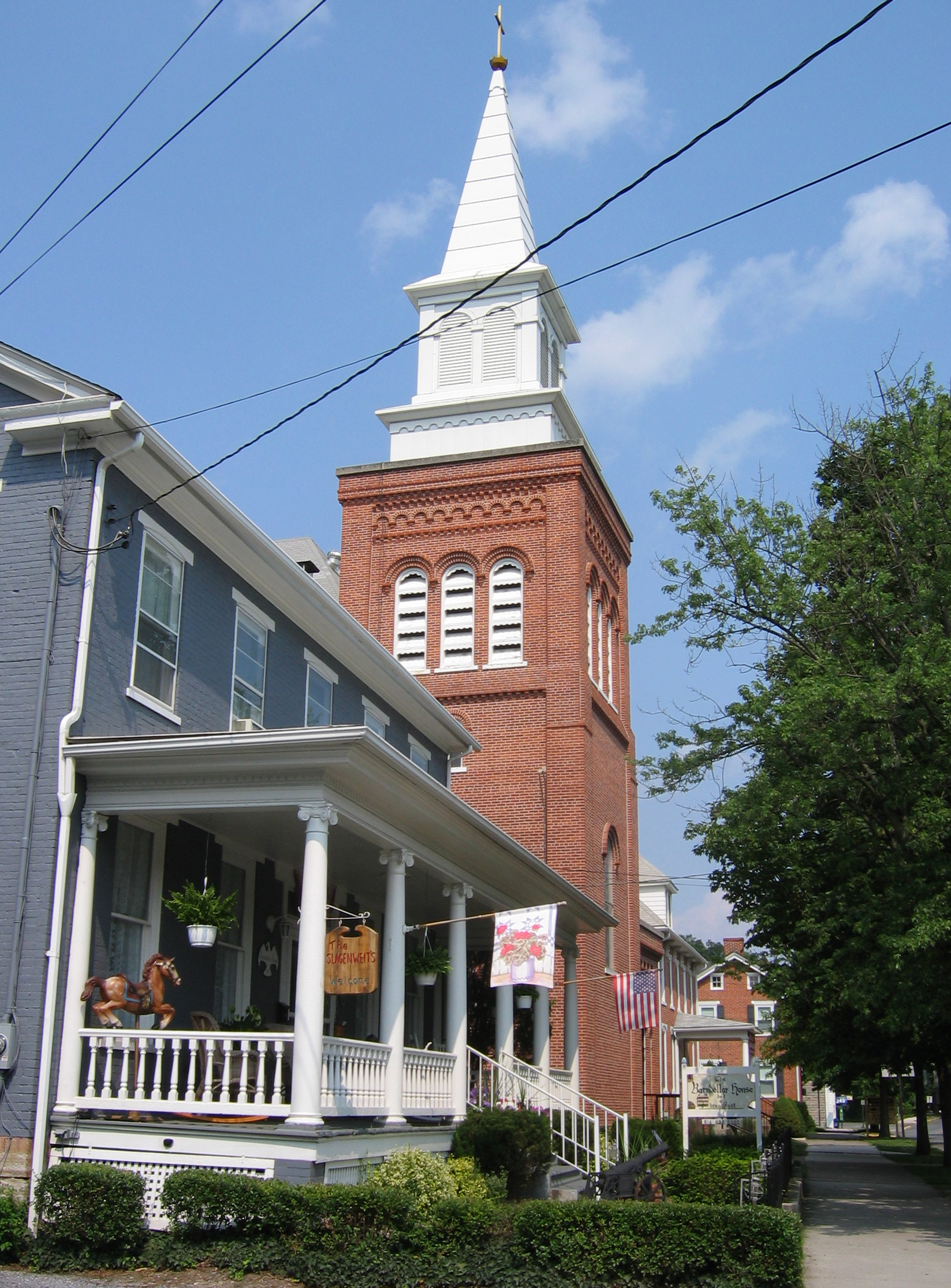
Everett United Methodist Church, along Main Street

== Geography ==
Everett is located in eastern Bedford County at 40°0′51″N 78°22′24″W (40.014049, -78.373202). It is bordered on the south by the unincorporated community of Earlston.

According to the United States Census Bureau, the borough has a total area of 1.1 square miles (2.8 km^{2}), all land.

Located in a valley of the Allegheny Mountains, Everett sits within a natural transportation corridor where the Raystown Branch of the Juniata River has carved a water gap, called The Narrows, through Tussey Mountain. The Alleghenies are a sub-region of the much larger Appalachian Mountains, and cover an area of central Pennsylvania, western Maryland and northern West Virginia. The countryside surrounding Everett is composed mainly of large forested areas, extensive agricultural fields, pasture, small villages, and woodlots.

U.S. Route 30 bypasses the borough along its northern edge. The highway's former route, the Lincoln Highway (now US-30 Business), passes through the center of town as Main Street. The Pennsylvania Turnpike (I-70/I-76) passes just south of the borough but does not provide access, with the nearest exits being Bedford 10 miles (16 km) to the west and Breezewood 8 miles (13 km) to the east.

Pennsylvania's longest hiking trail, the Mid State Trail, passes directly through the center of town, before continuing on towards nearby Rainsburg.

=== Climate ===
Climate data for Everett, Pennsylvania (1991–2020 normals, extremes 1897–present)
| Month | Jan | Feb | Mar | Apr | May | Jun | Jul | Aug | Sep | Oct | Nov | Dec | Year |
|---|---|---|---|---|---|---|---|---|---|---|---|---|---|
| Record high °F (°C) | 77 (25) | 80 (27) | 92 (33) | 96 (36) | 98 (37) | 102 (39) | 108 (42) | 102 (39) | 104 (40) | 92 (33) | 84 (29) | 77 (25) | 108 (42) |
| Mean daily maximum °F (°C) | 38.5 (3.6) | 41.7 (5.4) | 50.3 (10.2) | 62.9 (17.2) | 72.4 (22.4) | 80.3 (26.8) | 84.7 (29.3) | 83.4 (28.6) | 76.8 (24.9) | 65.1 (18.4) | 53.1 (11.7) | 42.8 (6.0) | 62.7 (17.1) |
| Daily mean °F (°C) | 29.6 (−1.3) | 32.0 (0.0) | 39.5 (4.2) | 50.4 (10.2) | 60.1 (15.6) | 68.5 (20.3) | 72.9 (22.7) | 71.4 (21.9) | 64.5 (18.1) | 53.0 (11.7) | 42.4 (5.8) | 34.1 (1.2) | 51.5 (10.8) |
| Mean daily minimum °F (°C) | 20.7 (−6.3) | 22.2 (−5.4) | 28.7 (−1.8) | 37.9 (3.3) | 47.8 (8.8) | 56.7 (13.7) | 61.1 (16.2) | 59.5 (15.3) | 52.2 (11.2) | 40.8 (4.9) | 31.8 (−0.1) | 25.4 (−3.7) | 40.4 (4.7) |
| Record low °F (°C) | −27 (−33) | −20 (−29) | −3 (−19) | 11 (−12) | 21 (−6) | 25 (−4) | 37 (3) | 31 (−1) | 25 (−4) | 16 (−9) | 1 (−17) | −12 (−24) | −27 (−33) |
| Average precipitation inches (mm) | 2.63 (67) | 2.21 (56) | 3.27 (83) | 3.88 (99) | 4.15 (105) | 4.20 (107) | 3.62 (92) | 3.28 (83) | 3.98 (101) | 3.17 (81) | 2.83 (72) | 3.13 (80) | 40.35 (1,025) |
| Average snowfall inches (cm) | 6.7 (17) | 8.4 (21) | 4.2 (11) | 0.2 (0.51) | 0.0 (0.0) | 0.0 (0.0) | 0.0 (0.0) | 0.0 (0.0) | 0.0 (0.0) | 0.0 (0.0) | 1.1 (2.8) | 6.4 (16) | 27.0 (69) |
| Average precipitation days (≥ 0.01 in) | 11.0 | 10.1 | 11.4 | 13.3 | 13.9 | 13.4 | 11.5 | 10.5 | 9.9 | 10.4 | 8.8 | 10.5 | 134.7 |
| Average snowy days (≥ 0.1 in) | 3.5 | 3.7 | 2.4 | 0.1 | 0.0 | 0.0 | 0.0 | 0.0 | 0.0 | 0.0 | 0.3 | 2.5 | 12.5 |
Source: NOAA

== Demographics ==
Historical population
| Census | Pop. | Note | %± |
|---|---|---|---|
| 1880 | 1,247 | | — |
| 1890 | 1,679 | | 34.6% |
| 1900 | 1,864 | | 11.0% |
| 1910 | 1,725 | | −7.5% |
| 1920 | 1,687 | | −2.2% |
| 1930 | 1,874 | | 11.1% |
| 1940 | 2,425 | | 29.4% |
| 1950 | 2,297 | | −5.3% |
| 1960 | 2,279 | | −0.8% |
| 1970 | 2,243 | | −1.6% |
| 1980 | 1,828 | | −18.5% |
| 1990 | 1,777 | | −2.8% |
| 2000 | 1,905 | | 7.2% |
| 2010 | 1,834 | | −3.7% |
| 2020 | 1,765 | | −3.8% |
| 2021 (est.) | 1,767 | ▲ | 0.1% |

As of the census of 2000, there were 1,905 people, 876 households, and 515 families residing in the borough. The population density was 1,773.4 inhabitants per square mile (684.7/km^{2}). There were 967 housing units at an average density of 900.2 units per square mile (347.6 units/km^{2}). The racial makeup of the borough was 98.43% White, 0.52% African American, 0.26% Asian, 0.26% from other races, and 0.52% from two or more races. Hispanic or Latino of any race were 0.52% of the population.

There were 876 households, out of which 27.6% had children under the age of 18 living with them, 43.5% were married couples living together, 12.0% had a female householder with no husband present, and 41.1% were non-families. Of all households 38.5% were made up of individuals, and 18.3% had someone living alone who was 65 years of age or older. The average household size was 2.15 and the average family size was 2.79.

In the borough the population was spread out, with 22.9% under the age of 18, 8.6% from 18 to 24, 26.3% from 25 to 44, 21.6% from 45 to 64, and 20.6% who were 65 years of age or older. The median age was 39 years. For every 100 females there were 83.2 males. For every 100 females age 18 and over, there were 76.9 males.

The median income for a household in the borough was $23,919, and the median income for a family was $33,819. Males had a median income of $26,953 versus $16,196 for females. The per capita income for the borough was $15,841. About 13.3% of families and 19.2% of the population were below the poverty line, including 22.7% of those under age 18 and 18.7% of those age 65 or over.

== Notable people ==
- Gerald Chamberlain, racing driver
- Dean Koontz, author
- William Piper (1774–1852) - U.S. Representative from Pennsylvania
- Bud Shuster (1932–2023), Republican congressman

== See also ==
- Bloody Run Canoe Classic
- Everett Area School District
- Tenley Park
- WSKE
- WZSK
