= Everett Historic District (Everett, Pennsylvania) =

Historic district in Pennsylvania, United States

- U.S. National Register of Historic Places
- U.S. Historic district
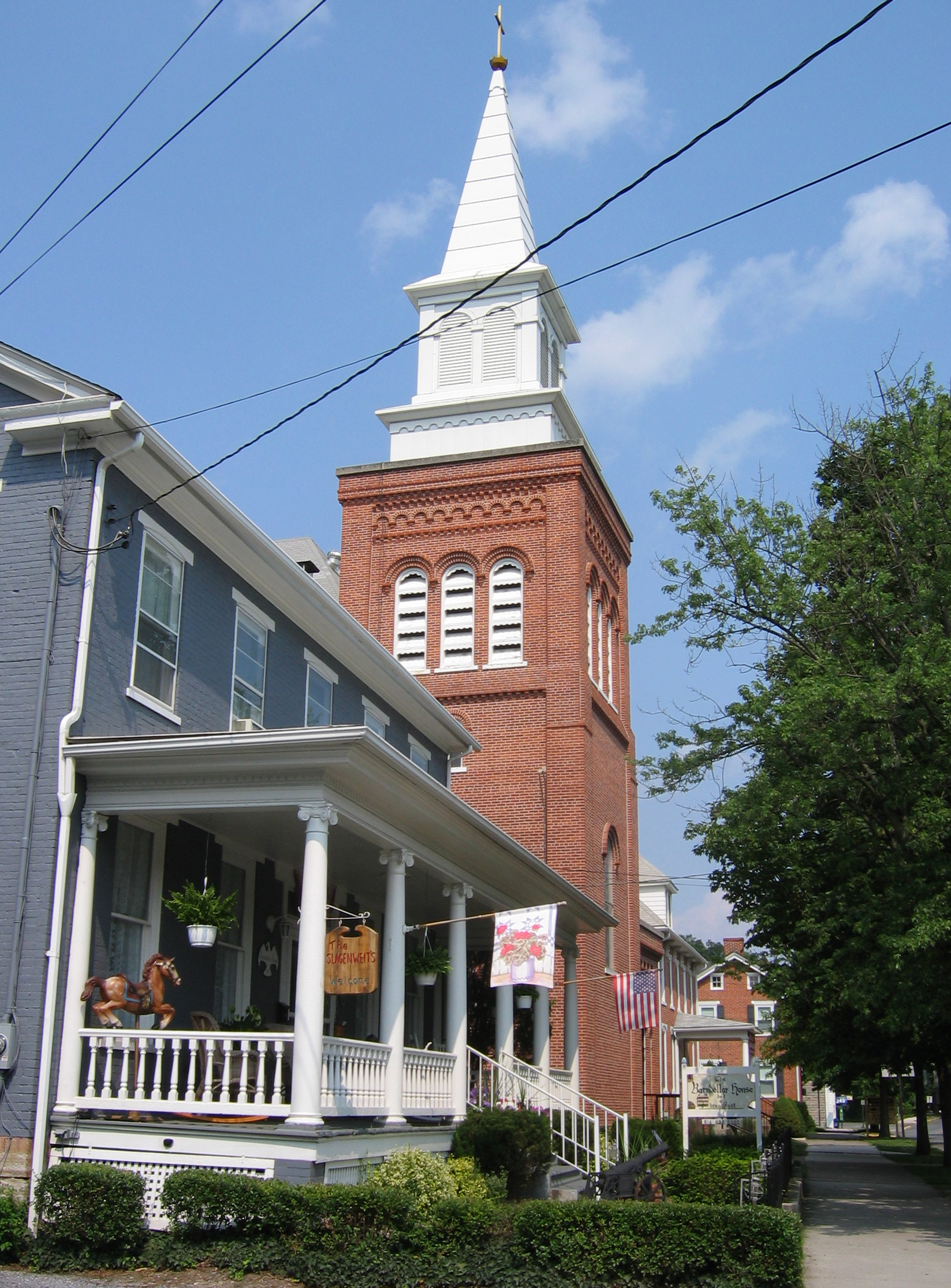
- Everett Historic District, July 2006

- Location within Pennsylvania Location within the United States
- Location: Roughly bounded by W. Fifth, Borough, Hill Sts., River Ln., South St. Barndollar Ave., Everett, Pennsylvania
- Coordinates: 40°00′47″N 78°22′19″W
- Area: 120 acres (49 ha)
- Architect: Multiple, including George Harrison Gibboney
- Architectural style: Federal, Gothic Revival
- MPS: Lincoln Highway Heritage Corridor Historic Resources: Franklin to Westmoreland Counties MPS
- NRHP reference No.: 03000492
- Added to NRHP: May 29, 2003

Everett Historic District is a national historic district located at Everett, Pennsylvania. The district includes 300 contributing buildings and 1 contributing object in the central business district and surrounding residential area of Everett. The buildings date between about 1830 and 1952, and include notable examples of Gothic Revival and Federal style architecture. Notable non-residential buildings include the U.S. Post Office (1938), Everett Free Library, Zion Lutheran Church, Grace Brethren Church, Barndollar Methodist Church (1860), Everett Hardware Company Building (c. 1915), foundry on North Juniata Street (1874), and Everett Manufacturing Company (1920-1955).

It was added to the National Register of Historic Places in 2003.
