= 2024 Northeast Conference women's basketball tournament =

- Classification: Division I
- Season: 2023–24
- Teams: 8
- Site: Campus sites
- Champions: Sacred Heart (5th title)
- Winning coach: Jessica Mannetti (2nd title)
- MVP: Ny'Ceara Pryor (Sacred Heart)
- Television: ESPNU, ESPN+, NEC Front Row

The 2024 Northeast Conference Women's Basketball Tournament was the postseason women's basketball tournament for the Northeast Conference (NEC) for the 2023–24 NCAA Division I women's basketball season. The tournament began on March 11, 2024 with first-round games, followed by semifinals on March 14 and the final on March 17, with all tournament games being played in the home arenas of the higher-seeded school. Regular-season NEC champion Sacred Heart won the tournament, receiving the conference's automatic bid to the 2024 NCAA Division I women's basketball tournament. The championship game was also Sacred Heart's last in NEC play, as the university will join the Metro Atlantic Athletic Conference in July 2024.

2023–24 Northeast Conference women's basketball standings
	Conf.				Overall
Team	W		L	PCT	W		L	PCT
Sacred Heart †	15	–	1	.938	24	–	10	.706
Le Moyne*	14	–	2	.875	18	–	15	.545
Fairleigh Dickinson	11	–	5	.688	14	–	17	.452
Merrimack	8	–	8	.500	12	–	19	.387
Central Connecticut	7	–	9	.438	9	–	21	.300
LIU	5	–	11	.313	8	–	22	.267
Stonehill*	4	–	12	.250	4	–	26	.133
Saint Francis	4	–	12	.250	5	–	25	.167
Wagner	4	–	12	.250	7	–	21	.250
* ineligible for the 2024 NCAA tournament due to transition period
† 2024 NEC tournament winner

== Seeds ==
The top eight teams in the conference regular-season standings qualified. Effective with the 2023–24 academic year, NEC teams transitioning from Division II are eligible for the NEC tournament during the entirety of their transition periods. If a reclassifying institution wins the NEC tournament championship, the tournament runner-up will be awarded the NEC's automatic bid to the NCAA tournament. If two reclassifying teams reach the final of the NEC tournament, the conference will stage an automatic qualifier game between the two non-advancing semifinalists. Previously, transitioning NEC teams were eligible for the conference tournament only during their third and fourth transition years. The rule change results in Stonehill and Le Moyne being eligible for the 2024 NEC tournament, since Stonehill is in its second transition year, and Le Moyne is in its first.

Teams were seeded by record within the conference, with a tiebreaker system to seed teams with identical conference records.

Seed	School	Conf.	Tiebreaker	Notes
1	Sacred Heart	15–1		
2	Le Moyne	14–2		
3	Fairleigh Dickinson	11–5		
4	Merrimack	8–8		
5	Central Connecticut	7–9		
6	LIU	5–11		
7	Stonehill	4–12	3–1 vs. Saint Francis/Wagner	
8	Saint Francis	4–12	2–2 vs. Stonehill/Wagner	
DNQ	Wagner	4–12	1–3 vs. Stonehill/Saint Francis	

== Schedule ==
Game	Time*	Matchup	Score	Television
Quarterfinals – Monday, March 11
1	7:00 pm	No. 8 Saint Francis at No. 1 Sacred Heart	48–78	NEC Front Row
2	7:00 pm	No. 7 Stonehill at No. 2 Le Moyne	59–79	NEC Front Row
3	7:00 pm	No. 6 LIU at No. 3 Fairleigh Dickinson	59–71	NEC Front Row
4	7:00 pm	No. 5 Central Connecticut at No. 4 Merrimack	51–76	NEC Front Row
Semifinals – Thursday, March 14
5	7:00 pm	No. 4 Merrimack at No. 1 Sacred Heart	41–73	YES, ESPN+
6	7:00 pm	No. 3 Fairleigh Dickinson at No. 2 Le Moyne	38–52	YES, ESPN+
Championship – Sunday, March 17
7	12:00 pm	No. 2 Le Moyne at No. 1 Sacred Heart	48–69	ESPNU
*Game times in ET. Rankings denote tournament seed

== Bracket ==
Teams will be reseeded after each round with highest remaining seeds receiving home-court advantage.

Quarterfinals; Monday, March 11; NEC Front Row
1	Sacred Heart	78
8	Saint Francis	48
4	Merrimack	76
5	Central Connecticut	51
(Pairings are reseeded after the first round)
2	Le Moyne	79
7	Stonehill	59
3	Fairleigh Dickinson	71
6	LIU	59

Semifinals; Thursday, March 14; YES/ESPN+
1	Sacred Heart	73
4	Merrimack	41
2	Le Moyne	52
3	Fairleigh Dickinson	38

Championship; Sunday, March 17; ESPNU
1	Sacred Heart	69
2	Le Moyne	48

== Awards and honors ==
Tournament MVP:

First Team
