= Binghamton Bearcats women's basketball =

American college basketball team

Binghamton Bearcats
2025–26 Binghamton Bearcats women's basketball team
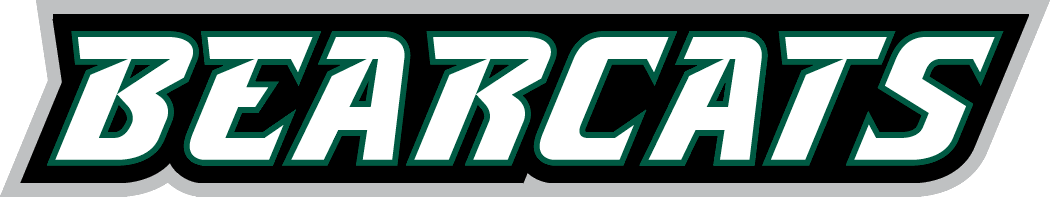
- University: Binghamton University
- Head coach: Mary Grimes (2nd season)
- Conference: America East
- Location: Vestal, New York
- Arena: Binghamton University Events Center (capacity: 5,322)
- Nickname: Bearcats
- Colors: Dark green, white, and black

Uniforms
Home	Away	Alternate

NCAA tournament appearances
- Division III: 1995, 1996, 1997, 1998; Division II: 1999

The Binghamton Bearcats women's basketball team represents Binghamton University and is located in Vestal, New York. The team currently competes in the America East Conference and plays its home games at the Binghamton University Events Center. The Bearcats have not made an appearance in the Division I tournament since joining it in 2001, but they did make appearances in the Division III Tournament from 1995 to 1998 and Division II in 1999.

== Postseason ==
=== NCAA Division II ===
The Bearcats made one appearance in the NCAA Division II women's basketball tournament. They had a record of 0–1.

Year	Round	Opponent	Result
1999	First Round	Stonehill	L 64–54

=== NCAA Division III ===
The Bearcats appeared in the NCAA Division III Tournament four times, with a combined record of 0–4.

Year	Round	Opponent	Result
1995	Play-In	St. John Fisher	L 55–79
1996	First Round	SUNY Geneseo	L 66–71
1997	First Round	Ithaca	L 66–73
1998	Second Round	Elmira	L 73–82

== Year by year results ==
Season	Team	Overall	Conference	Standing	Postseason	Coaches' poll	AP poll
Laurie Kelly (America East) (2001–2003)
2001–02	Laurie Kelly	19–9	10–6	T-2nd			
2002–03	Laurie Kelly	10–17	6–10	T-6th			
Laurie Kelly:		29–26	16–16				
Rich Conover (America East) (2003–2008)
2003–04	Rich Conover						
2004–05	Rich Conover						
2005–06	Rich Conover	17–12	9–7				
2006–07	Rich Conover	12–19	7–9				
2007–08	Rich Conover						
Rich Conover:							
Nicole Scholl (America East) (2008–2014)
2008–09	Nicole Scholl						
2009–10	Nicole Scholl						
2010–11	Nicole Scholl	19–12	11–5				
2011–12	Nicole Scholl	13–18	6–10				
2012–13	Nicole Scholl	6–24	5–11				
2013–14	Nicole Scholl	5–25	2–14				
Nicole Scholl:							
Linda Cimino (America East) (2014–2017)
2014–15	Linda Cimino	4–26	2–14				
2015–16	Linda Cimino	14–17	8–8				
2016–17	Linda Cimino	13–17	8–8				
Linda Cimino:		31–60	18–30				
Bethann Shapiro Ord (America East) (2017–present)
2017–18	Bethann Shapiro Ord	20–12	10–6				
2018–19	Bethann Shapiro Ord	12–18	7–9				
2019–20	Bethann Shapiro Ord	22–9	10–6				
2020–21	Bethann Shapiro Ord	5–11	5–9				
2021–22	Bethann Shapiro Ord	9–20	5–13				
2022–23	Bethann Shapiro Ord	13–17	6–10				
Bethann Shapiro Ord:		81–87	43–53				
Total:							
National champion Postseason invitational champion Conference regular season champion Conference regular season and conference tournament champion Division regular season champion Division regular season and conference tournament champion Conference tournament champion
