= 2015–16 Iona Gaels women's basketball team =

American college basketball season

2015–16 Iona Gaels women's basketball
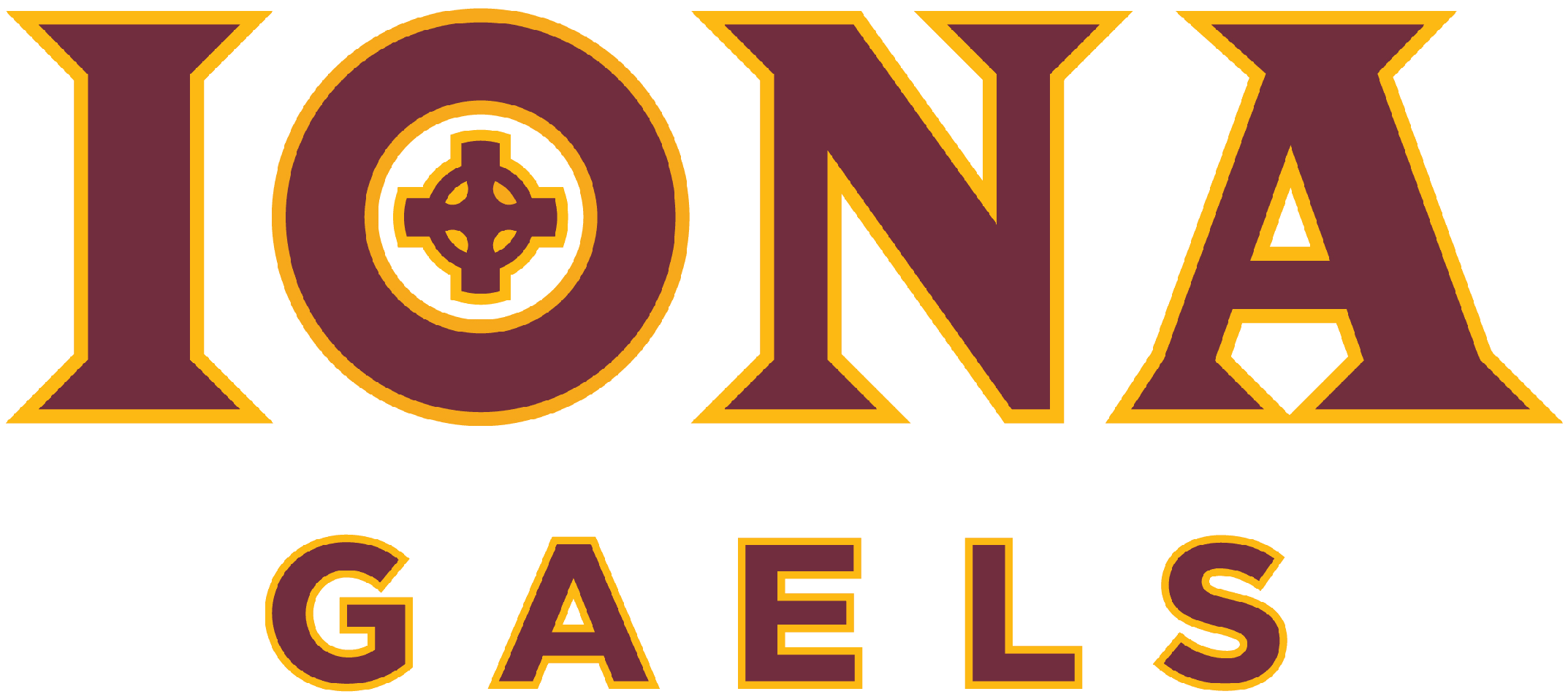

MAAC Tournament Champions

NCAA Women's Tournament, first round
- Conference: Metro Atlantic Athletic Conference
- Record: 23–12 (16–4 MAAC)
- Head coach: Billi Chambers (2nd season)
- Assistant coaches: Ashlee Kelly; Tatiyiana McMorris; Mandy Pennewell
- Home arena: Hynes Athletic Center

2015–16 MAAC women's basketball standings
	Conf.				Overall
Team	W		L	PCT	W		L	PCT
Quinnipiac	17	–	3	.850	25	–	9	.735
Iona †	16	–	4	.800	23	–	12	.657
Marist	14	–	6	.700	16	–	16	.500
Fairfield	11	–	9	.550	16	–	14	.533
Manhattan	11	–	9	.550	14	–	16	.467
Monmouth	11	–	9	.550	14	–	17	.452
Siena	10	–	10	.500	14	–	18	.438
Canisius	8	–	12	.400	13	–	17	.433
Niagara	5	–	15	.250	8	–	22	.267
Rider	5	–	15	.250	8	–	22	.267
St. Peter's	2	–	18	.100	4	–	26	.133
† 2016 MAAC tournament winner As of March 20, 2016; Rankings from AP poll

The 2015–16 Iona Gaels women's basketball team represented Iona College during the 2015–16 NCAA Division I women's basketball season. The Iona Gaels were coached by second year head coach, Billi Godsey. They played their home games in New Rochelle, New York, at the Hynes Athletic Center, and were members of the Metro Atlantic Athletic Conference (MAAC). They finished the season 23–12, 16–4 in MAAC play to finish in second place. They were champions of the MAAC women's tournament to earn an automatic bid to the NCAA women's tournament, where they lost in the first round to Maryland.

== NCAA Invitation ==
Iona has reached the conference championship game three times in the last decade. Each time, Marist prevailed, thwarting the Gales bid to in a conference championship and an invitation to the NCAA tournament. This year, Iona didn't face Marist, but faced Quinnipiac, a team who had defeated them twice in the regular-season. The third time, the result would be different — Iona opened up a 10-point lead at halftime and extended it in the second half to win 57–41 to earn their first ever invitation to the NCAA tournament.

== Roster ==
2015–16 Iona Gaels women's basketball team
Players
Coaches

Pos.	#	Name	Height	Year	Hometown
G	01	Marina Lizarazu	5 ft 8 in (1.73 m)	Jr	Madrid
F	02	Aurellia Cammock	5 ft 11 in (1.8 m)	Jr	Brooklyn, NY
G	03	Kristin Mahoney	5 ft 9 in (1.75 m)	So	The Woodlands, TX
F	10	Karynda Dupree	6 ft 4 in (1.93 m)	Sr	Milwaukee, WI
G	11	Philecia Gilmore	5 ft 7 in (1.7 m)	So	Memphis, TN
F	12	Casey Wortley	6 ft 2 in (1.88 m)	So	Tucson, AZ
G	20	Alexis Lewis	5 ft 10 in (1.78 m)	Fr	Pittston, PA
G	21	Aaliyah Robinson	5 ft 9 in (1.75 m)	Sr	Branford, CT
F	22	Treyanna Clay	6 ft 0 in (1.83 m)	Fr	Tucson, AZ
F	24	Joy Adams	5 ft 11 in (1.8 m)	Sr	Orlando, FL
F	30	Cassidee Ranger	5 ft 11 in (1.8 m)	Sr	Chandler, AZ
F	55	Iida Ahvenainen	5 ft 9 in (1.75 m)	Fr	Kotka, Finland

Head coach

- Billi Godsey (Hofstra)

Assistant coach(es)

- Ashlee Kelly (Quinnipiac)
- Tatiyiana McMorris (Marquette)
- Mandy Pennewell (Quinnipiac)

Legend

- (C) Team captain
- (S) Suspended
- (I) Ineligible
- (W) Walk-on
- Injured
- Current redshirt

Roster
Last update: February 7, 2016

== Schedule ==
Date time, TV	Rank^{#}	Opponent^{#}	Result	Record	Site (attendance) city, state
Regular Season
11/13/2015*; 7:00 pm		at Stony Brook	L 53–58	0–1	Island Federal Credit Union Arena (1,233); Stony Brook, NY
11/17/2015*; 7:00 pm		VCU	L 58–74	0–2	Hynes Athletic Center (350); New Rochelle, NY
11/20/2015*; 8:30 pm		vs. Yale; Hall of Fame Women’s Challenge	L 48–63	0–3	Carmichael Arena (1,676); Chapel Hill, NC
11/21/2015*; 3:00 pm		at North Carolina; Hall of Fame Women’s Challenge	L 52–64	0–4	Carmichael Arena (1,793); Chapel Hill, NC
11/22/2015*; 1:00 pm		vs. Fairleigh Dickinson; Hall of Fame Women’s Challenge	W 77–53	1–4	Carmichael Arena (1,142); Chapel Hill, NC
11/29/2015*; 12:00 pm, ESPN3		vs. USC; Hall of Fame Women’s Challenge	L 56–76	1–5	Mohegan Sun Arena (452); Uncasville, CT
12/02/2015; 7:00 pm		at Fairfield	W 56–46	2–5 (1–0)	Alumni Hall (213); Fairfield, CT
12/04/2015; 7:00 pm		Rider	W 59–46	3–5 (2–0)	Hynes Athletic Center (375); New Rochelle, NY
12/09/2015*; 7:00 pm		at Rutgers	L 33–58	3–6	Louis Brown Athletic Center (1,599); Piscataway, NJ
12/13/2015*; 2:00 pm		North Texas	W 62–51	4–6	Hynes Athletic Center (503); New Rochelle, NY
12/17/2015*; 11:30 am		at Saint Joseph's	W 81–75	5–6	Hagan Arena (1,667); Philadelphia, PA
12/20/2015*; 12:00 pm		at George Washington	L 65–70	5–7	Charles E. Smith Center (877); Washington, D.C.
12/29/2015*; 2:00 pm		East Tennessee State	W 56–50	6–7	Hynes Athletic Center (328); New Rochelle, NY
01/02/2016; 2:00 pm		Manhattan	W 67–56	7–7 (3–0)	Hynes Athletic Center (350); New Rochelle, NY
01/04/2016; 7:00 pm		at Saint Peter's	W 65–51	8–7 (4–0)	Yanitelli Center (350); Jersey City, NJ
01/07/2016; 5:00 pm, ESPN3		Marist	W 69–49	9–7 (5–0)	Hynes Athletic Center (1,476); New Rochelle, NY
01/10/2016; 2:00 pm, ESPN3		Canisius	W 79–56	10–7 (6–0)	Hynes Athletic Center (752); New Rochelle, NY
01/15/2016; 7:00 pm		at Marist	L 61–62	10–8 (6–1)	McCann Field House (1,685); Poughkeepsie, NY
01/18/2016; 2:00 pm		at Manhattan	L 56–63	10–9 (6–2)	Draddy Gymnasium (197); Riverdale, NY
01/21/2016; 7:00 pm		Niagara	W 73–46	11–9 (7–2)	Hynes Athletic Center (676); New Rochelle, NY
01/24/2016; 5:00 pm		at Monmouth	W 64–49	12–9 (8–2)	Multipurpose Activity Center (101); West Long Branch, NJ
01/30/2016; 3:00 pm		at Niagara	W 73–52	13–9 (9-2)	Gallagher Center (310); Lewiston, NY
02/01/2016; 7:00 pm, ESPN3		at Canisius	W 79–76	14–9 (10–2)	Koessler Athletic Center (626); Buffalo, NY
02/05/2016; 11:00 am, ESPN3		Monmouth	W 68–56	15–9 (11–2)	Hynes Athletic Center (901); New Rochelle, NY
02/07/2016; 1:00 pm		at Rider	W 67–48	16–9 (12–2)	Alumni Gymnasium (823); Lawrenceville, NJ
02/10/2016; 7:00 pm		at Siena	W 64–51	17–9 (13–2)	Alumni Recreation Center (465); Loudonville, NY
02/12/2016; 7:00 pm, SNY		at Quinnipiac	L 61–62	17–10 (13–3)	TD Bank Sports Center (886); Hamden, CT
02/19/2016; 7:00 pm, ESPN3		Siena	W 63–51	18–10 (14–3)	Hynes Athletic Center (240); New Rochelle, NY
02/21/2016; 2:00 pm, ESPN3		Saint Peter's	W 64–50	19–10 (15–3)	Hynes Athletic Center (905); New Rochelle, NY
02/24/2016; 4:00 pm, ESPN3		Fairfield	W 69–53	20–10 (16–3)	Hynes Athletic Center (786); New Rochelle, NY
02/28/2016; 1:00 pm, ESPN3		Quinnipiac	L 53–69	20–11 (16–4)	Hynes Athletic Center (982); New Rochelle, NY
MAAC Women's Tournament
03/05/2016; 2:30 pm		vs. Siena; Quarterfinals	W 64–47	21–11	Times Union Center (633); Albany, NY
03/06/2016; 1:30 pm, ESPN3		vs. Marist; Semifinals	W 57–53	22–11	Times Union Center; Albany, NY
03/07/2016; 2:30 pm, ESPNU		vs. Quinnipiac; Championship Game	W 57–41	23–11	Times Union Center (1,534); Albany, NY
NCAA Women's Tournament
03/19/2016*; 1:30 pm, ESPN2	(15 L)	at (2 L) No. 5 Maryland; First Round	L 58–74	23–12	Xfinity Center (5,374); College Park, MD
*Non-conference game. ^{#}Rankings from AP Poll. (#) Tournament seedings in parentheses. L=Lexington Region. All times are in Eastern Time.

== See also ==
- 2015–16 Iona Gaels men's basketball team
