= 2015–16 Vermont Catamounts women's basketball team =

Intercollegiate basketball season

2015–16 Vermont Catamounts women's basketball
- Conference: America East Conference
- Record: 9–21 (4–12 America East)
- Head coach: Lori Gear McBride (6th season)
- Assistant coaches: Courtnay Pilypaitis; Brett Benzio; Jon Silver
- Home arena: Patrick Gym

2015–16 America East Conference women's basketball standings
	Conf.				Overall
Team	W		L	PCT	W		L	PCT
Albany †	15	–	1	.938	28	–	5	.848
Maine	15	–	1	.938	26	–	9	.743
UMBC	8	–	8	.500	18	–	14	.563
Stony Brook	8	–	8	.500	17	–	15	.531
Binghamton	8	–	8	.500	14	–	17	.452
Hartford	7	–	9	.438	11	–	19	.367
New Hampshire	6	–	10	.375	12	–	18	.400
Vermont	4	–	12	.250	9	–	21	.300
UMass Lowell*	1	–	15	.063	4	–	24	.143
† 2016 America East tournament winner As of March 20, 2016 *ineligible for postseason play due to Div. I transitions Rankings from AP poll

The 2015–16 Vermont Catamounts women's basketball team represented the University of Vermont in the America East Conference. The Catamounts, led by sixth year head coach Lori Gear McBride, played their home games in the Patrick Gym. They finished the season 9–21, 4–12 in America East play to finish in eighth place. They lost in the quarterfinals of the America East women's tournament to Albany.

On March 25, Lori Gear McBride was fired. She finished at Vermont with a 6-year record of 46–134.

== Media ==
All non-televised home games and conference road games will stream on either ESPN3 or AmericaEast.tv. Select home games will be televised by the Northeast Sports Network. Most road games will stream on the opponents website. All games will be broadcast on WVMT 620 AM and streamed online through SportsJuice.com with Rob Ryan calling the action.

== Roster ==
2015–16 Vermont Catamounts women's basketball team
Players
Coaches

Pos.	#	Name	Height	Year	Previous school	Hometown
G	1	Kylie Butler	5 ft 8 in (1.73 m)	Jr	Desert Vista	Phoenix, AZ
G	3	Sydney Smith	5 ft 11 in (1.8 m)	So	Vernon Hills	Vernon Hills, IL
G	4	Hayley Robertson	5 ft 8 in (1.73 m)	Fr	Bill Crothers Secondary	Toronto, ON
G	10	Kylie Atwood	5 ft 5 in (1.65 m)	Sr	Lake Region Union	Irasburg, VT
F	11	Candice Wright	6 ft 3 in (1.91 m)	Fr	Jacob Hespeler	Cambridge, ON
G	12	Katie Lavelle	5 ft 9 in (1.75 m)	So	Long Island Lutheran	Hicksville, NY
G	13	Kristina White	5 ft 8 in (1.73 m)	RS So	Woodbury	Woodbury, MN
F	14	Lauren Handy	6 ft 2 in (1.88 m)	Fr	Northern Collegiate	Sarnia, ON
F	21	Courtney Wright	6 ft 0 in (1.83 m)	Fr	Jacob Hespeler	Cambridge, ON
G	22	Andreana Thomas	5 ft 4 in (1.63 m)	RS Sr	James Hillhouse; Hofstra	West Haven, CT
F	23	Gracia Hutson	6 ft 2 in (1.88 m)	Sr	Hopkins	Wayzata, MN
F	32	Rachel Merrill	6 ft 3 in (1.91 m)	So	Owego Free Academy	Owego, NY
G	33	Anna-Maria Manta	5 ft 10 in (1.78 m)	Fr	American Community Schools	Piraeus, Greece

Head coach

- Lori Gear McBride (North Carolina)

Assistant coach(es)

- Courtnay Pilypaitis (Vermont)
- Brett Benzio (Tulane)
- Jon Silver (UCLA)

Legend

- (C) Team captain
- (S) Suspended
- (I) Ineligible
- (W) Walk-on
- Injured
- Current redshirt

Roster

== Schedule ==
Date time, TV	Rank^{#}	Opponent^{#}	Result	Record	Site (attendance) city, state
Exhibition
11/07/2015*; 1:00 pm		Saint Michael's College	W 58–56		Patrick Gym (539); Burlington, VT
Non-conference regular season
11/13/2015*; 11:30 am		Central Connecticut	W 79–63	1–0	Patrick Gym (1,599); Burlington, VT
11/17/2015*; 7:00 pm		at Columbia	L 56–73	1–1	Levien Gymnasium (317); New York City, NY
11/21/2015*; 1:00 pm		at Bryant	L 52–68	1–2	Chace Athletic Center (218); Smithfield, RI
11/23/2015*; 7:00 pm		at Brown	L 54–71	1–3	Pizzitola Sports Center (218); Providence, RI
11/27/2015*; 7:00 pm		St. Francis Brooklyn; TD Bank Classic semifinals	L 55–59	1–4	Patrick Gym (575); Burlington, VT
11/28/2015*; 5:00 pm		Quinnipiac; TD Bank Classic 3rd place game	L 65–77	1–5	Patrick Gym (461); Burlington, VT
12/02/2015*; 7:00 pm		at Holy Cross	L 63–77	1–6	Hart Center (652); Worcester, MA
12/06/2015*; 2:00 pm		Sacred Heart	W 53–51	2–6	Patrick Gym (410); Burlington, VT
12/09/2015*; 12:00 pm		at Dartmouth	W 56–54	3–6	Leede Arena (1,904); Hanover, NH
12/20/2015*; 2:00 pm		at NJIT	W 54–46	4–6	Fleisher Center; Newark, NJ
12/22/2015*; 6:00 pm		at Delaware	L 60–71	4–7	Bob Carpenter Center (1,575); Newark, DE
12/28/2015*; 1:00 pm		at Boston University	W 60–45	5–7	Case Gym; Boston, MA
12/30/2015*; 2:00 pm		Oakland	L 68–74	5–8	Patrick Gym (515); Burlington, VT
America East regular season
01/02/2016; 1:00 pm		at UMBC	L 48–85	5–9 (0–1)	Retriever Activities Center (331); Catonsville, MD
01/06/2016; 7:00 pm		Maine	L 41–62	5–10 (0–2)	Patrick Gym (371); Burlington, VT
01/09/2016; 2:00 pm		at Albany	L 43–72	5–11 (0–3)	SEFCU Arena (1,362); Albany, NY
01/16/2016; 2:00 pm		Hartford	L 47–51	5–12 (0–4)	Patrick Gym (481); Burlington, VT
01/18/2016; 1:00 pm		at UMass Lowell	W 59–51	6–12 (1–4)	Costello Athletic Center (318); Lowell, MA
01/21/2016; 1:00 pm		Binghamton	L 53–57	6–13 (1–5)	Patrick Gym (427); Burlington, VT
01/27/2016; 7:00 pm		New Hampshire	W 83–63	7–13 (2–5)	Patrick Gym (427); Burlington, VT
01/30/2016; 2:00 pm		at Stony Brook	L 59–73	7–14 (2–6)	Island Federal Credit Union Arena (918); Stony Brook, NY
02/03/2016; 7:00 pm		at Maine	L 51–63	7–15 (2–7)	Cross Insurance Center (1,666); Bangor, ME
02/06/2016; 2:00 pm		Albany	L 40–75	7–16 (2–8)	Patrick Gym (371); Burlington, VT
02/08/2016; 7:00 pm		UMass Lowell	L 66–68	7–17 (2–9)	Patrick Gym (376); Burlington, VT
02/14/2016; 2:00 pm		at Hartford	L 50–52 ^{OT}	7–18 (2–10)	Chase Arena at Reich Family Pavilion (1,440); Hartford, CT
02/16/2016; 7:00 pm		at Binghamton	L 52–66	7–19 (2–11)	Binghamton University Events Center (1,305); Vestal, NY
02/20/2016; 1:00 pm		UMBC	L 60–74	7–20 (2–12)	Patrick Gym (952); Burlington, VT
02/25/2016; 7:00 pm		at New Hampshire	W 63–59	8–20 (3–12)	Lundholm Gym (313); Durham, NH
02/28/2016; 2:00 pm		Stony Brook	W 44–37	9–20 (4–12)	Patrick Gym (520); Burlington, VT
America East Women's Tournament
03/05/2016; 6:00 pm, ESPN3		vs. Albany; Quarterfinals	L 43–95	9–21	Binghamton University Events Center; Vestal, NY
*Non-conference game. ^{#}Rankings from AP Poll. (#) Tournament seedings in parentheses. All times are in Eastern Time.

== See also ==
- 2015–16 Vermont Catamounts men's basketball team
