= 2015–16 Siena Saints women's basketball team =

American college basketball season

2015–16 Siena Saints women's basketball
- Conference: Metro Atlantic Athletic Conference
- Record: 14–18 (10–10 MAAC)
- Head coach: Ali Jaques (4th season)
- Assistant coaches: Shannon Bush; Bridgette Mitchell; Sunny Vadopalaite
- Home arena: Times Union Center; Alumni Recreation Center

2015–16 MAAC women's basketball standings
	Conf.				Overall
Team	W		L	PCT	W		L	PCT
Quinnipiac	17	–	3	.850	25	–	9	.735
Iona †	16	–	4	.800	23	–	12	.657
Marist	14	–	6	.700	16	–	16	.500
Fairfield	11	–	9	.550	16	–	14	.533
Manhattan	11	–	9	.550	14	–	16	.467
Monmouth	11	–	9	.550	14	–	17	.452
Siena	10	–	10	.500	14	–	18	.438
Canisius	8	–	12	.400	13	–	17	.433
Niagara	5	–	15	.250	8	–	22	.267
Rider	5	–	15	.250	8	–	22	.267
St. Peter's	2	–	18	.100	4	–	26	.133
† 2016 MAAC tournament winner As of March 20, 2016; Rankings from AP poll

The 2015–16 Siena Saints women's basketball team represented Siena College during the 2015–16 NCAA Division I women's basketball season. The Saints, led by fourth year head coach, Ali Jaques, played their home games in play their home games at the Alumni Recreation Center with two games at Times Union Center, and were members of the Metro Atlantic Athletic Conference. They finished the season 14–18, 10–10 in MAAC play to finish in tenth place. They advanced to the quarterfinals of the MAAC women's tournament, where they lost to Iona.

== Schedule ==
Date time, TV	Rank^{#}	Opponent^{#}	Result	Record	Site (attendance) city, state
Regular Season
11/13/2015*; 5:30 pm		at St. Bonaventure; Preseason WNIT First Round	L 40–57	0–1	Reilly Center (1,090); Olean, NY
11/15/2015; 2:00 pm		Northeastern	L 67–70	0–2	Alumni Recreation Center (1,064); Loudonville, NY
11/20/2015*; 7:30 pm		at Southern Illinois; Preseason WNIT Consolation Round	L 54–73	0–3	SIU Arena (305); Carbondale, IL
11/21/2015*; 5:00 pm		vs. Alabama State	L 53–57	0–4	SIU Arena; Carbondale, IL
11/27/2015*; 6:00 pm		at Navy; Navy Classic semifinals	L 58–59 ^{OT}	0–5	Alumni Hall (607); Annapolis, MD
11/28/2015*; 3:30 pm		vs. Morgan State	W 69–46	1–5	Alumni Hall; Annapolis, MD
12/4/2015; 7:00 pm		at Monmouth	W 69–63	2–5 (1–0)	OceanFirst Bank Center; West Long Branch, NJ
12/6/2015; 2:00 pm		Saint Peter's	W 59–58 ^{OT}	3–5 (2–0)	Alumni Recreation Center; Loudonville, NY
12/9/2015*; 7:00 pm		at New Hampshire	W 57–53	4–5	Lundholm Gym (202); Durham, NH
12/12/2015*; 5:00 pm		Albany	L 42–61	4–6	Times Union Center (1,206); Albany, NY
12/28/2015*; 5:00 pm		at Colgate	L 50–52	4–7	Cotterell Court (516); Hamilton, NY
12/30/2015*; 7:00 pm		at Fairleigh Dickinson	W 81–65	5–7	Rothman Center (146); Hackensack, NJ
1/2/2016; 3:00 pm		at Niagara	W 59–51	6–7 (3–0)	Gallagher Center (267); Niagara University, NY
1/4/2016; 7:00 pm		at Canisius	W 58–52	7–7 (4–0)	Koessler Athletic Center; Buffalo, NY
1/8/2016; 7:00 pm		Rider	W 66–45	8–7 (5–0)	Alumni Recreation Center; Loudonville, NY
1/10/2016; 2:00 pm		Manhattan	W 60–59	9–7 (6–0)	Alumni Recreation Center; Loudonville, NY
1/15/2016; 11:00 am		Monmouth	W 64–54	10–7 (7–0)	Alumni Recreation Center; Loudonville, NY
1/17/2016; 1:00 pm		at Rider	L 58–70	10–8 (7–1)	Alumni Gymnasium; Lawrenceville, NJ
1/22/2016; 7:00 pm		Canisius	W 61–57	11–8 (8–1)	Alumni Recreation Center; Loudonville, NY
1/24/2016; 2:00 pm		at Quinnipiac	L 52–94	11–9 (8–2)	TD Bank Sports Center (387); Hamden, CT
1/28/2016; 5:00 pm		at Marist	L 37–66	11–10 (8–3)	McCann Arena (1,413); Poughkeepsie, NY
1/30/2016; 2:00 pm		at Saint Peter's	W 64–55	12–10 (9–3)	Yanitelli Center; Jersey City, NJ
2/5/2016; 5:00 pm		Quinnipiac	L 59–69	12–11 (9–4)	Times Union Center (808); Albany, NY
2/7/2016; 1:00 pm		at Fairfield	L 55–67	12–12 (9–5)	Alumni Hall; Fairfield, CT
2/10/2016; 7:00 pm		Iona	L 51–64	12–13 (9–6)	Alumni Recreation Center (465); Loudonville, NY
2/14/2016; 2:00 pm		at Manhattan	L 49–56	12–14 (9–7)	Draddy Gymnasium; Riverdale, NY
2/17/2016; 7:00 pm		Fairfield	L 51–71	12–15 (9–8)	Alumni Recreation Center; Loudonville, NY
2/19/2016; 7:00 pm, ESPN3		at Iona	L 51–63	12–16 (9–9)	Hynes Athletic Center (240); New Rochelle, NY
2/25/2016; 7:00 pm		Marist	W 60–56	13–16 (10–9)	Alumni Recreation Center (411); Loudonville, NY
2/27/2016; 2:00 pm		Niagara	L 45–54	13–17 (10–10)	Alumni Recreation Center; Loudonville, NY
MAAC Women's Tournament
3/3/2016; 11:30 am	(7)	(10) Rider; First round	W 79–76 ^{OT}	14–17	Times Union Center; Albany, NY
3/4/2016; 2:30 pm	(7)	(2) Iona; Quarterfinals	L 47–64	14–18	Times Union Center (633); Albany, NY
*Non-conference game. ^{#}Rankings from AP Poll. (#) Tournament seedings in parentheses. All times are in Eastern Time.

== See also ==
- 2015–16 Siena Saints men's basketball team
