= 2015–16 Quinnipiac Bobcats women's basketball team =

Intercollegiate basketball season

2015–16 Quinnipiac Bobcats women's basketball
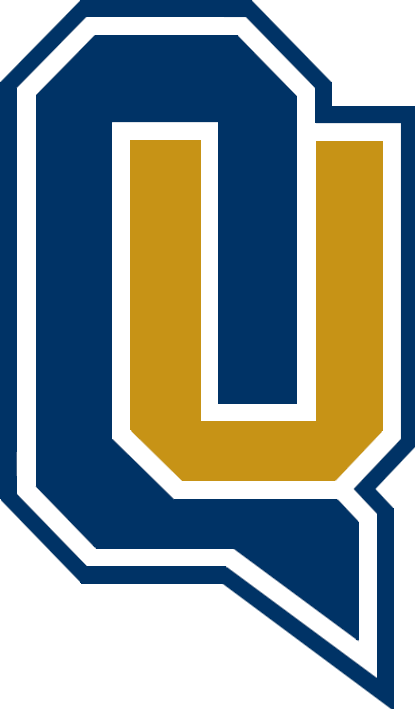

MAAC Regular Season Champions

WNIT, Second Round
- Conference: Metro Atlantic Athletic Conference
- Record: 25–9 (17–3 MAAC)
- Head coach: Tricia Fabbri (21st season)
- Assistant coaches: Mountain MacGillivray; Danielle Brennan; Marie Warner
- Home arena: TD Bank Sports Center

2015–16 MAAC women's basketball standings
	Conf.				Overall
Team	W		L	PCT	W		L	PCT
Quinnipiac	17	–	3	.850	25	–	9	.735
Iona †	16	–	4	.800	23	–	12	.657
Marist	14	–	6	.700	16	–	16	.500
Fairfield	11	–	9	.550	16	–	14	.533
Manhattan	11	–	9	.550	14	–	16	.467
Monmouth	11	–	9	.550	14	–	17	.452
Siena	10	–	10	.500	14	–	18	.438
Canisius	8	–	12	.400	13	–	17	.433
Niagara	5	–	15	.250	8	–	22	.267
Rider	5	–	15	.250	8	–	22	.267
St. Peter's	2	–	18	.100	4	–	26	.133
† 2016 MAAC tournament winner As of March 20, 2016; Rankings from AP poll

The 2015–16 Quinnipiac Bobcats women's basketball team represented Quinnipiac University during the 2015–16 NCAA Division I women's basketball season. The Bobcats, led by twenty-first head coach, Tricia Fabbri. They played their home games in TD Bank Sports Center, and were members of the Metro Atlantic Athletic Conference. They finished the season 25–9, 17–3 in MAAC play to win MAAC regular season title. They advanced to the championship game of the MAAC women's tournament, where they lost to Iona. As champs of the Metro Atlantic Athletic Conference who failed to win their conference tournament, they received an automatic bid to the Women's National Invitation Tournament, where they defeated Maine in the first round before losing to Temple in the second round.

== Roster ==
2015–16 Quinnipiac Bobcats women's basketball team
Players
Coaches

Pos.	#	Name	Height	Year	Previous school	Hometown
F	2	Tiffany Webster	6 ft 0 in (1.83 m)	RS Sr	Montrose Christian; Hampton	Washington, D.C.
G	3	Adily Martucci	5 ft 8 in (1.73 m)	RS Jr	Waterford	Waterford, CT
F	4	Paula Strautmane	6 ft 0 in (1.83 m)	Fr	Latvia U16, U18 & U20 National Team; TTT Riga	Mucenieki, Latvia
G	5	Carly Fabbri	5 ft 7 in (1.7 m)	So	Lauralton Hall	Stratford, CT
G	10	Maria Napolitano	5 ft 9 in (1.75 m)	Sr	Saint Ursula Academy	Cincinnati, OH
G	11	Edel Thornton	5 ft 11 in (1.8 m)	Fr	Ireland U18 National Team; Brunell	Gurranabraher, Ireland
F	12	Katie Carroll	6 ft 0 in (1.83 m)	Sr	Westlake	Westlake, OH
F	13	Sarah Shewan	6 ft 2 in (1.88 m)	So	St. Thomas Aquinas Catholic	Russell, ON
G	15	Brianah Ramos	5 ft 9 in (1.75 m)	Jr	DePaul Catholic	Montgomery, NY
F	21	Jen Fay	6 ft 0 in (1.83 m)	So	Lynbrook; Nazareth	Lynbrook, NY
G	22	Brittany Johnson	5 ft 11 in (1.8 m)	So	Pickerington North	Pickerington, OH
G	23	Brittany Martin	5 ft 6 in (1.68 m)	Fr	Timber Creek	Sicklerville, NJ
G/F	25	Aryn McClure	5 ft 11 in (1.8 m)	Fr	Archbishop Molloy	Springfield Gardens, NY
G	34	Shahara Ingram	5 ft 5 in (1.65 m)	Sr	Roosevelt	Yonkers, NY
F	35	Morgan Manz	6 ft 1 in (1.85 m)	Jr	Pomperaug; The Taft School	Southbury, CT

Head coach

- Tricia Fabbri (Fairfield)

Assistant coach(es)

- Mountain MacGillivray (Temple)
- Danielle Brennan (Hartford)
- Marie Warner (Canisius)

Legend

- (C) Team captain
- (S) Suspended
- (I) Ineligible
- (W) Walk-on
- Injured
- Current redshirt

Roster

== Schedule ==
Date time, TV	Rank^{#}	Opponent^{#}	Result	Record	Site (attendance) city, state
Regular season
11/15/2015*; 4:00 pm		at Army	L 57–67	0–1	Christl Arena (456); West Point, NY
11/19/2015*; 11:00 am		Hartford	W 71–69 ^{OT}	1–1	TD Bank Sports Center (1,329); Hamden, CT
11/21/2015*; 2:00 pm		Holy Cross	W 74–61	2–1	TD Bank Sports Center (421); Hamden, CT
11/24/2015*; 5:00 pm		Temple	W 58–56	3–1	TD Bank Sports Center (494); Hamden, CT
11/27/2015*; 3:00 pm		vs. Georgetown; TD Bank Classic semifinals	L 68–80	3–2	Patrick Gym; Burlington, VT
11/28/2015*; 5:00 pm		at Vermont; TD Bank Classic 3rd place game	W 77–65	4–2	Patrick Gym (461); Burlington, VT
12/03/2015; 7:00 pm		at Marist	L 47–56	4–3 (0–1)	McCann Field House (1,465); Poughkeepsie, NY
12/06/2015; 2:00 pm		Manhattan	L 42–52	4–4 (0–2)	TD Bank Sports Center (485); Hamden, CT
12/09/2015*; 7:00 pm		at Northeastern	W 71–60	5–4	Cabot Center (732); Boston, MA
12/21/2015*; 2:00 pm		at Drexel	L 49–62	5–5	Daskalakis Athletic Center (508); Philadelphia, PA
12/28/2015*; 7:00 pm, ESPN3		at Florida Gulf Coast	L 70–71 ^{OT}	5–6	Alico Arena (508); Fort Myers, FL
01/02/2016; 2:00 pm, ESPN3		at Monmouth	L 60–63	5–7 (0–3)	The MAC (536); West Long Branch, NJ
01/06/2016; 7:00 pm		Rider	W 64–51	6–7 (1–3)	TD Bank Sports Center (358); Hamden, CT
01/08/2016; 7:00 pm		Canisius	W 63–54	7–7 (2–3)	TD Bank Sports Center (455); Hamden, CT
01/15/2016; 11:00 am		at Niagara	W 61–54	8–7 (3–3)	Gallagher Center (2,000); Lewiston, NY
01/17/2016; 2:00 pm, ESPN3		at Canisius	W 80–68	9–7 (4–3)	Koessler Athletic Center (570); Buffalo, NY
01/22/2016; 7:00 pm		at Fairfield	W 64–55	10–7 (5–3)	Alumni Hall (441); Fairfield, CT
01/24/2016; 2:00 pm		Siena	W 94–52	11–7 (6–3)	TD Bank Sports Center (387); Hamden, CT
01/28/2016; 5:00 pm		Monmouth	W 85–58	12–7 (7–3)	TD Bank Sports Center (340); Hamden, CT
02/02/2016; 7:00 pm		Saint Peter's	W 66–49	13–7 (8–3)	TD Bank Sports Center (291); Hamden, CT
02/05/2016; 5:00 pm, ESPNU		at Siena	W 69–59	14–7 (9–3)	Times Union Center (808); Albany, NY
02/07/2016; 2:00 pm		Niagara	W 70–52	15–7 (10–3)	TD Bank Sports Center (686); Hamden, CT
02/12/2016; 2:00 pm, SNY		Iona	W 62–61	16–7 (11–3)	TD Bank Sports Center (886); Hamden, CT
02/14/2016; 12:00 pm		at Saint Peter's	W 65–53	17–7 (12–3)	Yanitelli Center (224); Jersey City, NJ
02/18/2016; 5:00 pm, ESPN3		Marist	W 76–71	18–7 (13–3)	TD Bank Sports Center (912); Hamden, CT
02/21/2016; 2:00 pm		at Rider	W 65–47	19–7 (14–3)	Alumni Gymnasium (550); Lawrenceville, NJ
02/23/2016; 5:00 pm, ESPN3		at Manhattan	W 81–63	20–7 (15–3)	Draddy Gymnasium (173); Riverdale, NY
02/26/2016; 5:00 pm		Fairfield	W 83–58	21–7 (16–3)	TD Bank Sports Center (982); Hamden, CT
02/28/2016; 1:00 pm		at Iona	W 69–53	22–7 (17–3)	Hynes Athletic Center (982); New Rochelle, NY
MAAC Women's Tournament
03/04/2016; 12:00 pm		vs. Niagara; Quarterfinals	W 74–51	23–7	Times Union Center; Albany, NY
03/06/2016; 11:00 am, ESPN3		vs. Monmouth; Semifinals	W 66–59	24–7	Times Union Center; Albany, NY
03/07/2016; 2:30 pm, ESPNU		vs. Iona; Championship Game	L 41–57	24–8	Times Union Center (1,534); Albany, NY
WNIT
03/18/2016*; 7:00 pm		Maine; First Round	W 90–44	25–8	TD Bank Sports Center (437); Hamden, CT
03/20/2016*; 2:00 pm		Temple; Second Round	L 62–64	25–9	TD Bank Sports Center (338); Hamden, CT
*Non-conference game. ^{#}Rankings from AP Poll. (#) Tournament seedings in parentheses. All times are in Eastern Time.

== See also ==
- 2015–16 Quinnipiac Bobcats men's basketball team
