= 2016 MAAC women's basketball tournament =

- Classification: Division I
- Season: 2015–16
- Teams: 11
- Site: Times Union Center; Albany, NY
- Champions: Iona (1st title)
- Winning coach: Billi Godsey (1st title)
- MVP: Marina Lizarazu (Iona)
- Television: ESPNU/ESPN3

2015–16 MAAC women's basketball standings
	Conf.				Overall
Team	W		L	PCT	W		L	PCT
Quinnipiac	17	–	3	.850	25	–	9	.735
Iona †	16	–	4	.800	23	–	12	.657
Marist	14	–	6	.700	16	–	16	.500
Fairfield	11	–	9	.550	16	–	14	.533
Manhattan	11	–	9	.550	14	–	16	.467
Monmouth	11	–	9	.550	14	–	17	.452
Siena	10	–	10	.500	14	–	18	.438
Canisius	8	–	12	.400	13	–	17	.433
Niagara	5	–	15	.250	8	–	22	.267
Rider	5	–	15	.250	8	–	22	.267
St. Peter's	2	–	18	.100	4	–	26	.133
† 2016 MAAC tournament winner As of March 20, 2016; Rankings from AP poll

The 2016 Metro Atlantic Athletic Conference women's basketball tournament was held March 3–7 at the Times Union Center in Albany, New York. Iona defeated Quinnipiac to win their first MAAC Tournament to earn their first automatic trip to the NCAA women's basketball tournament in school history.

== Seeds ==
Teams are seeded by conference record, with a ties broken by record between the tied teams followed by record against the regular-season champion, if necessary.

Seed	School	Conf (Overall)	Tiebreaker
#1	Quinnipiac	17–3 (22–7)	
#2	Iona	16–4 (20–11)	
#3	Marist	14–6 (15–15)	
#4	Fairfield	11–9 (16–13)	3–1 vs. Monmouth, Manhattan
#5	Monmouth	11–9 (13–16)	2–2 vs. Manhattan, Fairfield
#6	Manhattan	11–9 (14–15)	1–3 vs. Fairfield, Monmouth
#7	Siena	10–10 (13–17)	
#8	Canisius	8–12 (13–16)	
#9	Niagara	5–15 (8–21)	1–1 vs. Rider
#10	Rider	5–15 (7–22)	1–1 vs. Niagara
#11	St. Peter's	2–18 (4–25)	

== Schedule ==
Game	Time*	Matchup^{#}	Television	Attendance
First round – Thursday, March 3
1	9:30 am	#8 Canisius vs. #9 Niagara		
2	11:30 am	#7 Siena vs. #10 Rider		
3	1:30 pm	#6 Manhattan vs. #11 St. Peter's		
Quarterfinals – Friday, March 4 & Saturday, March 5
4	Noon	#1 Quinnipiac vs. #9 Niagara		2,844
5	2:30 pm	#4 Fairfield vs. #5 Monmouth		2,844
6	12:00 pm	#3 Marist vs. #6 Manhattan		
7	2:30 pm	#2 Iona vs. #7 Siena		
Semifinals – Sunday, March 6
8	11:00 am	#1 Quinnipiac vs. #5 Monmouth	ESPN3	
9	1:30 pm	#3 Marist vs. #2 Iona	ESPN3	
Championship – Monday, March 7
10	2:30 pm	#1 Quinnipiac vs. #2 Iona	ESPNU	1,534
*Game Times in Eastern Time Zone. #-Rankings denote tournament seeding.

== Bracket and Results ==
First round Thursday, March 3
8	Canisius	64
9	Niagara	65
7	Siena	79^{OT}
10	Rider	76
6	Manhattan	60
11	St. Peter's	43

Quarterfinals; Friday, March 4 Saturday, March 5
1	Quinnipiac	74
9	Niagara	51
4	Fairfield	46
5	Monmouth	64
2	Iona	64
7	Siena	47
3	Marist	70
6	Manhattan	58

Semifinals; Sunday, March 6 ESPN3
1	Quinnipiac	66
5	Monmouth	59
2	Iona	57
3	Marist	53

Championship game Monday, March 7 ESPNU
1	Quinnipiac	41
2	Iona	57

All times listed are Eastern

== See also ==
- Metro Atlantic Athletic Conference
- MAAC women's basketball tournament
- 2016 MAAC men's basketball tournament
