= 2015–16 Fairleigh Dickinson Knights women's basketball team =

American college basketball season

2015–16 Fairleigh Dickinson Knights women's basketball
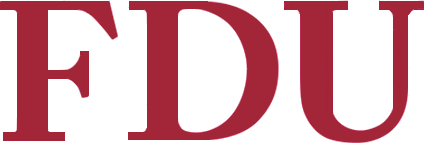
- Conference: Northeast Conference
- Record: 9-15 (6-5 NEC)
- Head coach: Peter Cinella (8th season)
- Assistant coaches: Devin Jefferson; Jennifer Walkling; Brian Sansom
- Home arena: Rothman Center

2015–16 Northeast Conference women's basketball standings
	Conf.				Overall
Team	W		L	PCT	W		L	PCT
Sacred Heart	16	–	2	.889	20	–	13	.606
Bryant	14	–	4	.778	18	–	13	.581
Robert Morris†	11	–	7	.611	20	–	13	.606
Saint Francis (PA)	11	–	7	.611	15	–	17	.469
Central Connecticut	9	–	9	.500	12	–	18	.400
Fairleigh Dickinson	8	–	10	.444	11	–	21	.344
LIU Brooklyn	7	–	11	.389	9	–	21	.300
Mount St. Mary's	7	–	11	.389	9	–	21	.300
St. Francis Brooklyn	4	–	14	.222	7	–	22	.241
Wagner	3	–	15	.167	5	–	24	.172
† 2016 NEC tournament winner As of March 19, 2016; Rankings from AP poll

The 2015–16 Fairleigh Dickinson Knights women's basketball team represented Fairleigh Dickinson University during the 2015–16 NCAA Division I women's basketball season. The Knights were coached by Peter Cinella, who was in his eighth season, at the helm. The Knights competed in the Northeast Conference. They played their home games at the Rothman Center, which seated 5,000, in Hackensack, New Jersey.

== Roster ==
2015–16 Fairleigh Dickinson Knights women's basketball team
Players
Coaches

Pos.	#	Name	Height	Year	Hometown
G	1	Madelynn Comly	5 ft 9 in (1.75 m)	Fr	Littlestown, PA
F	3	Anastasia Williams	6 ft 1 in (1.85 m)	RS Jr	Central Islip, NY
G	5	Natalie Zamora	5 ft 8 in (1.73 m)	Fr	Albuquerque, NM
G	10	Peniel M'Bikata	5 ft 10 in (1.78 m)	Fr	Abbotsford, BC
F	11	Jackie Jackson	6 ft 0 in (1.83 m)	RS Jr	Gaithersburg, MD
F	12	Rainey Cox	5 ft 10 in (1.78 m)	So	South Boston, MA
F	13	Amina Markovic	6 ft 1 in (1.85 m)	So	Brooklyn, NY
F	14	Brianna Thomas	5 ft 7 in (1.7 m)	RS Jr	Baldwin, NY
G	20	Zeynep Akgun	5 ft 7 in (1.7 m)	Jr	Ankara, TUR
F	21	Busra Saral	6 ft 1 in (1.85 m)	So	Ankara, TUR
G	22	Kiana Brown	5 ft 7 in (1.7 m)	Jr	Richmond, VA
C	23	Erika Livermore	6 ft 1 in (1.85 m)	RS Sr	Nazareth, PA
G	24	Kelsey Cruz	5 ft 7 in (1.7 m)	Sr	Chester, VA
C	30	Icies Hammer	6 ft 1 in (1.85 m)	Fr	North Bergen, NJ

Head coach

- Peter Cinella (New England College)

Assistant coach(es)

- Devin Jefferson (Seton Hall)
- Jennifer Walkling (Fairleigh Dickinson)
- Brian Sansom (Pitt–Bradford)

Legend

- (C) Team captain
- (S) Suspended
- (I) Ineligible
- (W) Walk-on
- Injured
- Current redshirt

Roster

== Schedule ==
Date time, TV	Rank^{#}	Opponent^{#}	Result	Record	Site (attendance) city, state
Non-conference regular season
11/14/15*; 2:00 pm		Manhattan	L 78–85	0–1	Rothman Center (279); Hackensack, NJ
11/20/15*; 6:00 pm		at North Carolina; Naismith Memorial Basketball Hall of Fame	L 46–64	0–2	Carmichael Arena (1,676); Chapel Hill, NC
11/21/15*; 5:20 pm		vs. Yale; Naismith Memorial Basketball Hall of Fame	L 58–77	0–3	Carmichael Arena (1,793); Chapel Hill, NC
11/22/15*; 1:00 pm		vs. Iona; Naismith Memorial Basketball Hall of Fame	L 54–77	0–4	Carmichael Arena; Chapel Hill, NC
11/29/15*; 10:00 am		vs. Grand Canyon; Naismith Memorial Basketball Hall of Fame	W 74–68	1–4	Mohegan Sun Arena (1,016); Uncasville, CT
12/04/15*; 7:00 pm		at Bucknell	L 62–72	1–5	Sojka Pavilion (401); Lewisburg, PA
12/06/15*; 4:00 pm		at West Virginia	L 42–91	1–6	WVU Coliseum (1,782); Morgantown, WV
12/09/15*; 7:00 pm		Saint Peter's	W 73–52	2–6	Rothman Center (117); Hackensack, NJ
12/18/15*; 5:30 pm		UMass Lowell	L 67–78	2–7	Rothman Center (218); Hackensack, NJ
12/20/16; 7:00 pm		Monmouth	W 81–75	3–7	Rothman Center (152); Hackensack, NJ
12/29/15*; 2:00 pm		Brown	L 48–63	3–8	Rothman Center (163); Hackensack, NJ
12/30/15*; 7:00 pm		Siena	L 65–81	3–9	Rothman Center (146); Hackensack, NJ
Northeast Conference Regular Season
1/02/16; 2:00 pm		St. Francis Brooklyn	W 65–61	4–9 (1–0)	Rothman Center (126); Hackensack, NJ
1/04/16; 5:00 pm		Bryant	L 41–70	4–10 (1–1)	Rothman Center (113); Hackensack, NJ
1/06/16*; 7:00 pm		Columbia	L 83–87 ^{2OT}	4–11	Rothman Center (211); Hackensack, NJ
1/09/16; 1:00 pm		at Sacred Heart	L 61–72	4–12 (1–2)	William H. Pitt Center; Fairfield, CT
1/11/16; 7:00 pm		Central Connecticut State	L 75–78	4–13 (1–3)	Rothman Center (241); Hackensack, NJ
1/16/16; 7:00 pm		at Robert Morris	W 83–68	5–13 (2–3)	Charles L. Sewall Center (423); Moon Township, PA
1/18/16; 7:00 pm		at Saint Francis (PA)	L 67–87	5–14 (2–4)	DeGol Arena (472); Loretto, PA
1/23/16; 2:00 pm		Mount Saint Mary's	W 66–53	6–14 (3–4)	Rothman Center; Hackensack, NJ
1/25/16; 7:00 pm		LIU Brooklyn	W 75–58	7–14 (4–4)	Rothman Center (209); Hackensack, NJ
1/30/16; 12:30 pm		at LIU Brooklyn	L 62–65	7–15 (4–5)	Steinberg Wellness Center (418); Brooklyn, NY
2/1/16; 7:00 pm		Saint Francis (PA)	W 73–72	8–15 (5–5)	Rothman Center (301); Hackensack, NJ
2/6/16; 1:00 pm		at Wagner	W 73–57	9–15 (6–5)	Spiro Sports Center (627); Staten Island, NY
2/8/16; 7:00 pm		at St. Francis Brooklyn	L 78–88	9–16 (6–6)	Generoso Pope Athletic Complex (225); Brooklyn, NY
2/13/16; 2:00 pm		Robert Morris	W 60–52	10–16 (7–6)	Rothman Center (423); Hackensack, NJ
2/15/16; 7:00 pm		at Mount St. Mary's	L 55–71	10–17 (7–7)	Knott Arena (102); Emmitsburg, MD
2/20/16; 4:00 pm, ESPN3		Mount St. Mary's	L 65–80	10–18 (7–8)	Rothman Center (545); Hackensack, NJ
2/22/16; 7:00 pm		Wagner	W 75–67	11–18 (8–8)	Rothman Center (342); Hackensack, NJ
2/27/16; 1:00 pm		at Central Connecticut	L 59–71	11–19 (8–9)	William H. Detrick Gymnasium; New Britain, CT
2/29/16; 7:00 pm		at Bryant	L 52–74	11–20 (8–10)	Chace Athletic Center (349); Smithfield, RI
Northeast Conference tournament
3/6/2016; 1:05 pm		at Robert Morris; Quarterfinals	L 59–68	11–21	Charles L. Sewall Center (251); Moon Township, PA|-
*Non-conference game. ^{#}Rankings from AP Poll. (#) Tournament seedings in parentheses. All times are in Eastern Time.
