= 2015–16 Albany Great Danes women's basketball team =

Intercollegiate basketball season

2015–16 Albany Great Danes women's basketball

America East Regular Season co-champions & Tournament Champions

NCAA Women's Tournament, second round
- Conference: America East Conference
- Record: 28–5 (15–1 America East)
- Head coach: Katie Abrahamson-Henderson (6th season)
- Assistant coaches: Mary Grimes; Tahnee Balerio; Isoken Uzamere
- Home arena: SEFCU Arena

2015–16 America East Conference women's basketball standings
	Conf.				Overall
Team	W		L	PCT	W		L	PCT
Albany †	15	–	1	.938	28	–	5	.848
Maine	15	–	1	.938	26	–	9	.743
UMBC	8	–	8	.500	18	–	14	.563
Stony Brook	8	–	8	.500	17	–	15	.531
Binghamton	8	–	8	.500	14	–	17	.452
Hartford	7	–	9	.438	11	–	19	.367
New Hampshire	6	–	10	.375	12	–	18	.400
Vermont	4	–	12	.250	9	–	21	.300
UMass Lowell*	1	–	15	.063	4	–	24	.143
† 2016 America East tournament winner As of March 20, 2016 *ineligible for postseason play due to Div. I transitions Rankings from AP poll

The 2015–16 Albany Great Danes women's basketball team represented the University at Albany, SUNY during the 2015–16 NCAA Division I women's basketball season. The Great Danes were led by sixth-year head coach Katie Abrahamson-Henderson and played their home games at SEFCU Arena. They were members of the America East Conference. They finished the season 28–5, 15–1 in America East play to share the America East regular season title with Maine. They were also champions of the America East Women's Tournament for the fifth straight year. They received an automatic bid to the NCAA women's tournament, where they upset Florida in the first round before falling to Syracuse in the second round.

On April 1 it was announced that Katie Abrahamson-Henderson had resigned from Albany and accepted a coaching position at Central Florida. She finished at Albany with a 6-year record of 144–46.

== Media ==
All home games and conference road games were streamed on either ESPN3 on AmericaEast.tv. Most road games were streamed on the opponent's website. Selected games were broadcast on the radio on WCDB.

== Roster ==
2015–16 Albany Great Danes women's basketball team
Players
Coaches

Pos.	#	Name	Height	Year	Previous school	Hometown
G	1	Erin Coughlin	5 ft 6 in (1.68 m)	Sr	Tabor Academy	North Attleboro, MA
G	2	Aubrey Hernandez	5 ft 6 in (1.68 m)	RS Jr	Loudonville Christian; Hudson Valley CC	Troy, NY
G/F	10	Bailey Hixson	6 ft 1 in (1.85 m)	Jr	Manchester-Shortsville; Monroe CC	Shortsville, NY
G	12	Imani Tate	5 ft 8 in (1.73 m)	Jr	Bishop Loughlin	Bronx, NY
F	13	Bose Aiyalogbe	6 ft 0 in (1.83 m)	RS So	Life Center Academy	Lagos, Nigeria
G/F	15	Jessica Feguiere	5 ft 11 in (1.8 m)	So	Champlain College Saint-Lambert	Montreal, QE
G	20	Bridget Murphy	5 ft 9 in (1.75 m)	So	Bethlehem Central	Bethlehem, NY
F	21	Veronika Lavergne	6 ft 4 in (1.93 m)	So	St. Peter	Ottawa, ON
F	22	Heather Forster	6 ft 2 in (1.88 m)	Fr	Huntington	Huntington, NY
G	23	Zakiya Saunders	5 ft 9 in (1.75 m)	So	Carthage Central	Fort Drum, NY
G	24	Khara Keane	5 ft 8 in (1.73 m)	Fr	St. Joseph's College	Toronto, ON
F	25	Shereesha Richards	6 ft 1 in (1.85 m)	Jr	Atlantic Christian	Rae Town, Jamaica
C	32	Megan Craig	6 ft 9 in (2.06 m)	Sr	Kamo	Whanārei, New Zealand
F/C	33	Tiana-Jo Carter	6 ft 2 in (1.88 m)	Fr	Lake Region	Naples, ME
G	34	Cassandra Edwards	5 ft 10 in (1.78 m)	So	Notre Dame CSS	Brampton, ON

Head coach

- Katie Abrahamson-Henderson (Iowa)

Assistant coach(es)

- Mary Grimes (Siena)
- Tahnee Balerio (Missouri State)
- Isoken Uzamere (Hofstra)

Legend

- (C) Team captain
- (S) Suspended
- (I) Ineligible
- (W) Walk-on
- Injured
- Current redshirt

Roster

== Schedule ==
Date time, TV	Rank^{#}	Opponent^{#}	Result	Record	Site (attendance) city, state
Non-conference regular season
11/15/2015*; 1:00 pm		Pepperdine	W 64–49	1–0	SEFCU Arena (863); Albany, NY
11/18/2015*; 7:00 pm		at Boston University	W 83–43	2–0	Case Gym (231); Boston, MA
11/21/2015*; 3:00 pm		vs. Toledo; URI Tournament	W 63–55	3–0	Ryan Center (417); Kingston, RI
11/22/2015*; 12:00 pm		at Rhode Island; URI Tournament	W 67–58	4–0	Ryan Center (425); Kingston, RI
11/27/2015*; 12:00 pm		at No. 4 Tennessee	L 55–63	4–1	Thompson–Boling Arena (9,806); Knoxville, TN
12/01/2015*; 7:00 pm		Providence	W 71–58	5–1	SEFCU Arena (856); Albany, NY
12/05/2015*; 3:00 pm		at Army	L 62–65	5–2	Christl Arena (754); West Point, NY
12/09/2015*; 7:00 pm		at Fairfield	W 62–50	6–2	Alumni Hall (123); Fairfield, CT
12/12/2015*; 5:00 pm		at Siena	W 61–42	7–2	Times Union Center (1,206); Albany, NY
12/18/2015*; 11:00 pm		vs. UC Davis; Women of Troy Classic semifinals	W 80–70	8–2	Galen Center (425); Los Angeles, CA
12/20/2015*; 6:00 pm		at USC; Women of Troy Classic championship	L 67–68	8–3	Galen Center (977); Los Angeles, CA
12/30/2015*; 6:00 pm		Yale	W 74–70	9–3	SEFCU Arena (832); Albany, NY
American East regular season
01/06/2016; 7:00 pm		at UMBC	W 77–42	10–3 (1–0)	Retriever Activities Center (317); Catonsville, MD
01/09/2016; 2:00 pm		Vermont	W 72–43	11–3 (2–0)	SEFCU Arena (1,362); Albany, NY
01/13/2016; 12:00 pm		at New Hampshire	W 78–52	12–3 (3–0)	Lundholm Gym (1,537); Durham, NH
01/16/2016; 12:00 pm, ESPN3		Maine	W 64–59	13–3 (4–0)	SEFCU Arena (986); Albany, NY
01/18/2016; 2:00 pm		at Binghamton	W 59–47	14–3 (5–0)	Binghamton University Events Center (1,775); Vestal, NY
01/21/2016; 7:00 pm		Stony Brook	W 73–54	15–3 (6–0)	SEFCU Arena (1,392); Albany, NY
01/27/2016; 11:00 am		at UMass Lowell	W 85–55	16–3 (7–0)	Tsongas Center (3,363); Lowell, MA
01/31/2016; 2:00 pm, ESPN3		at Hartford	W 78–41	17–3 (8–0)	Chase Arena at Reich Family Pavilion (1,516); Hartford, CT
02/03/2016; 7:00 pm		UMBC	W 63–39	18–3 (9–0)	SEFCU Arena (1,704); Albany, NY
02/06/2016; 2:00 pm		at Vermont	W 75–40	19–3 (10–0)	Patrick Gym (474); Burlington, VT
02/08/2016; 2:00 pm		Binghamton	W 64–58	20–3 (11–0)	SEFCU Arena (1,403); Albany, NY
02/11/2016; 12:00 pm		New Hampshire	W 75–48	21–3 (12–0)	SEFCU Arena (3,016); Albany, NY
02/14/2016; 1:00 pm, ESPN3		at Maine	L 53–65	21–4 (12–1)	Cross Insurance Center (3,231); Bangor, ME
02/17/2016; 7:00 pm		at Stony Brook	W 62–49	22–4 (13–1)	Island Federal Credit Union Arena (1,004); Stony Brook, NY
02/25/2016; 7:00 pm		UMass Lowell	W 88–57	23–4 (14–1)	SEFCU Arena (1,197); Albany, NY
02/28/2016; 2:00 pm, ESPN3		Hartford	W 84–39	24–4 (15–1)	SEFCU Arena (1,647); Albany, NY
America East Women's Tournament
03/05/2016; 6:00 pm, ESPN3		vs. Vermont; Quarterfinals	W 95–43	25–4	Binghamton University Events Center; Vestal, NY
03/06/2016; 4:15 pm, ESPN3		vs. Binghamton; Semifinals	W 79–43	26–4	Binghamton University Events Center (2,904); Vestal, NY
03/11/2016; 4:30 pm, ESPNU		Maine; Championship Game	W 59–58	27–4	SEFCU Arena (1,519); Albany, NY
NCAA Women's Tournament
03/18/2016*; 12:00 pm, ESPN2	(12 SF)	vs. (5 SF) No. 25 Florida; First Round	W 61–59	28–4	Carrier Dome (2,445); Syracuse, NY
03/20/2016*; 12:00 pm, ESPN2	(12 SF)	at (4 SF) No. 14 Syracuse; Second Round	L 59–76	28–5	Carrier Dome (3,842); Syracuse, NY
*Non-conference game. ^{#}Rankings from AP Poll. (#) Tournament seedings in parentheses. SF=Sioux Falls Region. All times are in Eastern Time.

== Rankings ==
+ Regular season polls	Poll	Pre- season	Week 2	Week 3	Week 4	Week 5	Week 6	Week 7	Week 8	Week 9	Week 10	Week 11	Week 12	Week 13	Week 14	Week 15	Week 16	Week 17	Week 18	Week 19	Final
AP	NR	NR	NR	NR	NR	NR	NR	NR	NR	NR	NR	RV	RV	RV	NR	NR	NR	RV	RV	N/A	
Coaches	RV	RV	NR	RV	NR	RV	NR	NR	NR	NR	NR	RV	RV	RV	RV	RV	RV	RV	RV	RV	

Legend
	Increase in ranking
	Decrease in ranking
	No change
(RV)	Received votes
(NR)	Not ranked

== See also ==
- 2015–16 Albany Great Danes men's basketball team
- Albany Great Danes women's basketball
