= 2015–16 Stony Brook Seawolves women's basketball team =

Intercollegiate basketball season

2015–16 Stony Brook Seawolves women's basketball

WBI, First Round
- Conference: America East Conference
- Record: 17–15 (8–8 America East)
- Head coach: Caroline McCombs (2nd season)
- Assistant coaches: Chenel Harris; Adam Call; Kelly Rotan
- Home arena: Island Federal Credit Union Arena

2015–16 America East Conference women's basketball standings
	Conf.				Overall
Team	W		L	PCT	W		L	PCT
Albany †	15	–	1	.938	28	–	5	.848
Maine	15	–	1	.938	26	–	9	.743
UMBC	8	–	8	.500	18	–	14	.563
Stony Brook	8	–	8	.500	17	–	15	.531
Binghamton	8	–	8	.500	14	–	17	.452
Hartford	7	–	9	.438	11	–	19	.367
New Hampshire	6	–	10	.375	12	–	18	.400
Vermont	4	–	12	.250	9	–	21	.300
UMass Lowell*	1	–	15	.063	4	–	24	.143
† 2016 America East tournament winner As of March 20, 2016 *ineligible for postseason play due to Div. I transitions Rankings from AP poll

The 2015–16 Stony Brook Seawolves women's basketball team represented Stony Brook University during the 2015–16 NCAA Division I women's basketball season. The Seawolves, led by second year head coach Caroline McCombs, played their home games at the Island Federal Credit Union Arena and were members in the America East Conference. They finished the season 17–15, 8-8 in America East play to finish in a 3-way tie for fourth part place. They advanced to the semifinals of the America East women's tournament, where they lost to Maine. They were invited to the Women's Basketball Invitational, where they lost to Youngstown State in the first round.

== Media ==
All non-televised home games and conference road games will stream on either ESPN3 or AmericaEast.tv. Most road games will stream on the opponents website. All games will have an audio broadcast streamed online through the Pack Network.

== Roster ==
2015–16 Stony Brook Seawolves women's basketball team
Players
Coaches

Pos.	#	Name	Height	Year	Previous school	Hometown
G	0	Lauren Williams (I) (redshirt)	5 ft 8 in (1.73 m)	So	North Babylon; Florida Atlantic	Longwood, FL
G	1	Davion Wingate	5 ft 6 in (1.68 m)	Fr	Stephenson	Atlanta, GA
G	4	Christa Scognamiglio	5 ft 9 in (1.75 m)	RS Jr	Pearl River; Fairfield	Orangeburg, NY
G	5	Kori Bayne-Walker	5 ft 5 in (1.65 m)	Jr	Gates-Chili	Rochester, NY
G	11	Jerell Matthews	5 ft 9 in (1.75 m)	Fr	Marian Catholic	Chicago, IL
G	14	Miranda Jenkins	5 ft 7 in (1.7 m)	RS Sr	Eastern Guilford	Greensboro, NC
F	20	Brittany Snow	6 ft 0 in (1.83 m)	Sr	Seneca	Shamong, NJ
G	21	Aaliyah Worley	5 ft 11 in (1.8 m)	So	George Washington Carver	Philadelphia, PA
F	22	Ogechi Anyagaligbo	6 ft 0 in (1.83 m)	Fr	Miami County Day	Miami, FL
G	23	Kim Hanlon	5 ft 8 in (1.73 m)	Sr	White Plains	White Plains, NY
F	24	Elizabeth Manner	6 ft 1 in (1.85 m)	RS So	Oakton	Vienna, VA
F	35	Anamaria Skaro	5 ft 11 in (1.8 m)	Jr	Garrett College	Split, Croatia
F	40	Alyssa Coiro	6 ft 1 in (1.85 m)	RS Sr	Rutgers Prep	Califon, NJ

Head coach

- Caroline McCombs (Youngstown State)

Assistant coach(es)

- Chenel Harris (Kent State)
- Adam Call (Oklahoma)
- Kelly Rotan (Junita)

Legend

- (C) Team captain
- (S) Suspended
- (I) Ineligible
- (W) Walk-on
- Injured
- Current redshirt

Roster

== Schedule ==
Date time, TV	Rank^{#}	Opponent^{#}	Result	Record	Site (attendance) city, state
Non-conference regular season
11/13/2015*; 7:00 pm		Iona	W 58–53	1–0	Island Federal Credit Union Arena (1,233); Stony Brook, NY
11/17/2015*; 7:00 pm		at Hofstra	L 66–71	1–1	Hofstra Arena (315); Hempstead, NY
11/20/2015*; 7:00 pm		at Saint Peter's	W 66–35	2–1	Yanitelli Center (150); Jersey City, NJ
11/23/2015*; 7:00 pm		at Columbia	W 79–71	3–1	Levien Gymnasium (281); New York City, NY
11/27/2015*; 2:00 pm		Ole Miss	L 57–72	3–2	Island Federal Credit Union Arena (898); Stony Brook, NY
12/01/2015*; 7:00 pm		St. Bonaventure	L 68–73 ^{2OT}	3–3	Island Federal Credit Union Arena (433); Stony Brook, NY
12/04/2015*; 7:00 pm		at Cornell	W 58–49	4–3	Newman Arena (230); Ithaca, NY
12/06/2015*; 2:00 pm, ESPN3		at No. 20 Syracuse	L 49–64	4–4	Carrier Dome (219); Syracuse, NY
12/12/2015*; 2:00 pm		at Yale	L 57–62	4–5	John J. Lee Amphitheater (214); New Haven, CT
12/14/2015*; 6:00 pm		Morgan State	W 46–42	5–5	Island Federal Credit Union Arena (503); Stony Brook, NY
12/18/2015*; 7:00 pm		at Wagner	W 73–62	6–5	Spiro Sports Center (353); Staten Island, NY
12/21/2015*; 6:00 pm		LIU Brooklyn	W 71–54	7–5	Island Federal Credit Union Arena (784); Stony Brook, NY
12/30/2015*; 4:00 pm		Harvard	W 64–63	8–5	Island Federal Credit Union Arena (841); Stony Brook, NY
America East regular season
01/06/2016; 12:00 pm		Binghamton	W 64–58	9–5 (1–0)	Island Federal Credit Union Arena (1,045); Stony Brook, NY
01/09/2016; 2:00 pm		at UMass Lowell	W 64–50	10–5 (2–0)	Costello Athletic Center (241); Lowell, MA
01/13/2016; 12:00 pm, ESPN3		at UMBC	W 69–60 ^{OT}	11–5 (3–0)	Retriever Activities Center (2,004); Catonsville, MD
01/16/2016; 2:00 pm		New Hampshire	W 63–54	12–5 (4–0)	Island Federal Credit Union Arena (211); Stony Brook, NY
01/18/2016; 5:00 pm		Hartford	W 58–35	13–5 (5–0)	Island Federal Credit Union Arena (816); Stony Brook, NY
01/21/2016; 7:00 pm		at Albany	L 54–73	13–6 (5–1)	SEFCU Arena (1,392); Albany, NY
01/24/2016; 1:00 pm		at Maine	L 52–55	13–7 (5–2)	Cross Insurance Center (2,123); Bangor, ME
01/30/2016; 2:00 pm		Vermont	W 73–59	14–7 (6–2)	Island Federal Credit Union Arena (918); Stony Brook, NY
02/03/2016; 7:00 pm		at Binghamton	L 47–54	14–8 (6–3)	Binghamton University Events Center (1,193); Vestal, NY
02/06/2016; 2:00 pm		UMass Lowell	W 60–46	15–8 (7–3)	Island Federal Credit Union Arena (851); Stony Brook, NY
02/08/2016; 7:00 pm		at Hartford	W 45–42	16–8 (8–3)	Chase Arena at Reich Family Pavilion (803); Hartford, CT
02/11/2016; 7:00 pm		UMBC	L 65–69 ^{OT}	16–9 (8–4)	Island Federal Credit Union Arena (711); Stony Brook, NY
02/14/2016; 1:00 pm		at New Hampshire	L 46–49	16–10 (8–5)	Lundholm Gym (414); Durham, NH
02/17/2016; 5:00 pm		Albany	L 49–62	16–11 (8–6)	Island Federal Credit Union Arena (1,004); Stony Brook, NY
02/20/2016; 2:00 pm, ESPN3		Maine	L 42–60	16–12 (8–7)	Island Federal Credit Union Arena (1,042); Stony Brook, NY
01/28/2016; 2:00 pm		at Vermont	L 37–44	16–13 (8–8)	Patrick Gym (520); Burlington, VT
America East Women's Tournament
03/05/2016; 2:15 pm, ESPN3		vs. Hartford; Quarterfinals	W 60–42	17–13	Binghamton University Events Center; Vestal, NY
03/06/2016; 2:00 pm, ESPN3		vs. Maine; Semifinals	L 48–51	17–14	Binghamton University Events Center; Vestal, NY
WBI
03/16/2016*; 7:00 pm		at Youngstown State; First Round	L 60–67	17–15	Beeghly Center (1,287); Youngtown, OH
*Non-conference game. ^{#}Rankings from AP Poll. (#) Tournament seedings in parentheses. All times are in Eastern Time.

== See also ==
- 2015–16 Stony Brook Seawolves men's basketball team
