= 2015–16 Hartford Hawks women's basketball team =

Intercollegiate basketball season

2015–16 Hartford Hawks women's basketball
- Conference: America East Conference
- Record: 11–19 (7–9 America East)
- Head coach: Jennifer Rizzotti (17th season)
- Assistant coaches: Bill Sullivan; Jackie Smith; Sarah Eichler
- Home arena: Chase Arena at Reich Family Pavilion

2015–16 America East Conference women's basketball standings
	Conf.				Overall
Team	W		L	PCT	W		L	PCT
Albany †	15	–	1	.938	28	–	5	.848
Maine	15	–	1	.938	26	–	9	.743
UMBC	8	–	8	.500	18	–	14	.563
Stony Brook	8	–	8	.500	17	–	15	.531
Binghamton	8	–	8	.500	14	–	17	.452
Hartford	7	–	9	.438	11	–	19	.367
New Hampshire	6	–	10	.375	12	–	18	.400
Vermont	4	–	12	.250	9	–	21	.300
UMass Lowell*	1	–	15	.063	4	–	24	.143
† 2016 America East tournament winner As of March 20, 2016 *ineligible for postseason play due to Div. I transitions Rankings from AP poll

The 2015–16 Hartford Hawks women's basketball team represented the University of Hartford during the 2015–16 NCAA Division I women's basketball season. The Hawks were led by seventeenth year Women's Basketball Hall of Fame head coach Jennifer Rizzotti and played their home games in the Chase Arena at Reich Family Pavilion and were members of the America East Conference. They finished the season 11–19, 7–9 in America East play to finish in sixth place. They lost in the quarterfinals of the America East women's tournament to Stony Brook.

On April 15, 2016, it was announced that Rizzotti had resigned from Hartford and accepted the coaching position at George Washington. She finished at Hartford with a 17-year record of 316–200.

== Media ==
All home games and conference road games will stream on either ESPN3 or AmericaEast.tv. Most road games will stream on the opponents website. All games will be broadcast on the radio on WWUH.

== Roster ==
2015–16 Hartford Hawks women's basketball team
Players
Coaches

Pos.	#	Name	Height	Year	Previous school	Hometown
G	3	Deanna Mayza	5 ft 7 in (1.7 m)	Jr	The Hill School	Pennsburg, PA
F	4	Christie Michals	6 ft 1 in (1.85 m)	Sr	Robinson Secondary	Fairfax, VA
G	5	Lindsey Abed	5 ft 6 in (1.68 m)	Fr	Oakton	Oakton, VA
G	10	Mary Pattison	5 ft 9 in (1.75 m)	So	Troy	Troy, NY
G	11	Katelyn Skinner	5 ft 10 in (1.78 m)	Sr	Homer Center	Homer City, PA
F	12	La'Trice Hall	5 ft 11 in (1.8 m)	Jr	Buffalo Academy of the Sacred Heart	Buffalo, NY
G/F	13	Kelly Douglass	5 ft 10 in (1.78 m)	Fr	Clifton	Clifton, NJ
F	15	Darby Lee	6 ft 0 in (1.83 m)	So	Altoona Area	Altoona, PA
F	20	Jalay Knowles	6 ft 0 in (1.83 m)	Fr	Ossining	Ossining, NY
G	23	Morgan Lumb	5 ft 8 in (1.73 m)	Jr	North Andover	North Andover, MA
F	24	Alyssa Reaves	6 ft 0 in (1.83 m)	Jr	Northwest Catholic	Bloomfield, CT
G	30	Mallory Shickora	5 ft 8 in (1.73 m)	Sr	Mount Saint Dominic Academy	Little Falls, NJ
F	33	Janelle Harrison	6 ft 0 in (1.83 m)	So	Cromwell	Cromwell, CT

Head coach

- Jennifer Rizzotti (Connecticut)

Assistant coach(es)

- Bill Sullivan (Connecticut)
- Jackie Smith (Hartford)
- Sarah Eichler (Green Bay)

Legend

- (C) Team captain
- (S) Suspended
- (I) Ineligible
- (W) Walk-on
- Injured
- Current redshirt

Roster

== Schedule ==
Date time, TV	Rank^{#}	Opponent^{#}	Result	Record	Site (attendance) city, state
Non-conference regular season
11/13/2015*; 7:00 pm		Cornell	W 53–50	1–0	Chase Arena at Reich Family Pavilion (862); West Hartford, CT
11/15/2015*; 7:00 pm		at Sacred Heart	W 68–67	2–0	William H. Pitt Center (312); Fairfield, CT
11/19/2015*; 11:00 am		at Quinnipiac	L 69–71 ^{OT}	2–1	TD Bank Sports Center (1,329); Hamden, CT
11/22/2015*; 2:00 pm		Lafayette	W 55–50	3–1	Chase Arena at Reich Family Pavilion (802); West Hartford, CT
11/25/2015*; 12:00 pm		at Providence	L 50–69	3–2	Alumni Hall (802); Providence, RI
11/27/2015*; 7:00 pm		at Michigan	L 47–83	3–3	Crisler Center (2,004); Ann Arbor, MI
12/02/2015*; 7:00 pm		Central Connecticut; Rivalry	W 49–41	4–3	Chase Arena at Reich Family Pavilion (1,402); West Hartford, CT
12/09/2015*; 7:00 pm		at Boston College	L 28–62	4–4	Conte Forum (411); Chestnut Hill, MA
12/12/2015*; 2:00 pm		Dartmouth	L 36–43	4–5	Chase Arena at Reich Family Pavilion (883); West Hartford, CT
12/14/2015*; 7:00 pm		No. 21 Arizona State	L 29–60	4–6	Chase Arena at Reich Family Pavilion (1,822); West Hartford, CT
12/22/2015*; 2:00 pm		at Massachusetts	L 56–63	4–7	Mullins Center (256); Amherst, MA
12/30/2015*; 7:00 pm		at George Washington	L 51–82	4–8	Charles E. Smith Center (915); Washington, D.C.
01/02/2016*; 7:00 pm, ESPN3		at Florida Gulf Coast	L 44–64	4–9	Alico Arena (2,217); Fort Myers, FL
America East regular season
01/06/2016; 7:00 pm		UMass Lowell	W 72–59	5–9 (1–0)	Chase Arena at Reich Family Pavilion (784); West Hartford, CT
01/13/2016; 7:00 pm		Binghamton	L 47–53	5–10 (1–1)	Chase Arena at Reich Family Pavilion (825); West Hartford, CT
01/16/2016; 2:00 pm		at Vermont	W 51–47	6–10 (2–1)	Patrick Gym (481); Burlington, VT
01/18/2016; 5:00 pm		at Stony Brook	L 35–58	6–11 (2–2)	Island Federal Credit Union Arena (816); Stony Brook, NY
01/21/2016; 7:00 pm		UMBC	W 65–57	7–11 (3–2)	Chase Arena at Reich Family Pavilion (1,012); West Hartford, CT
01/24/2016; 12:00 pm, ESPN3		New Hampshire	W 48–44	8–11 (4–2)	Chase Arena at Reich Family Pavilion (1,091); West Hartford, CT
01/27/2016; 7:00 pm		at Maine	L 43–61	8–12 (4–3)	Cross Insurance Center (1,559); Bangor, ME
01/31/2016; 2:00 pm, ESPN3		Albany	L 41–78	8–13 (4–4)	Chase Arena at Reich Family Pavilion (1,516); West Hartford, CT
02/03/2016; 7:00 pm		at UMass Lowell	W 75–70 ^{OT}	9–13 (5–4)	Costello Athletic Center (449); Lowell, MA
02/08/2016; 7:00 pm		Stony Brook	L 42–45	9–14 (5–5)	Chase Arena at Reich Family Pavilion (816); West Hartford, CT
02/11/2016; 7:00 pm		at Binghamton	W 41–39	10–14 (6–5)	Binghamton University Events Center (1,266); Vestal, NY
02/14/2016; 2:00 pm		Vermont	W 52–50 ^{OT}	11–14 (7–5)	Chase Arena at Reich Family Pavilion (1,440); West Hartford, CT
02/17/2016; 7:00 pm		at UMBC	L 51–58	11–15 (7–6)	Retriever Activities Center (486); Catonsville, MD
02/20/2016; 1:00 pm		at New Hampshire	L 42–53	11–16 (7–7)	Lundholm Gym (384); Durham, NH
02/24/2016; 7:00 pm		Maine	L 44–50	11–17 (7–8)	Chase Arena at Reich Family Pavilion (1,091); West Hartford, CT
02/28/2016; 2:00 pm, ESPN3		at Albany	L 39–84	11–18 (7–9)	SEFCU Arena (1,647); Albany, NY
America East Women's Tournament
03/05/2016; 2:15 pm, ESPN3	(6)	vs. (3) Stony Brook; Quarterfinals	L 42–60	11–19	Binghamton University Events Center; Vestal, NY
*Non-conference game. ^{#}Rankings from AP Poll. (#) Tournament seedings in parentheses. All times are in Eastern Time.

== See also ==
- 2015–16 Hartford Hawks men's basketball team
- Hartford Hawks women's basketball
