= 2015–16 New Hampshire Wildcats women's basketball team =

Intercollegiate basketball season

2015–16 New Hampshire Wildcats women's basketball
- Conference: America East Conference
- Record: 12–18 (6–10 America East)
- Head coach: Maureen Magarity (6th season)
- Assistant coaches: Brendan Copes; Kelsey Hogan; Whitney Edwards
- Home arena: Lundholm Gym

2015–16 America East Conference women's basketball standings
	Conf.				Overall
Team	W		L	PCT	W		L	PCT
Albany †	15	–	1	.938	28	–	5	.848
Maine	15	–	1	.938	26	–	9	.743
UMBC	8	–	8	.500	18	–	14	.563
Stony Brook	8	–	8	.500	17	–	15	.531
Binghamton	8	–	8	.500	14	–	17	.452
Hartford	7	–	9	.438	11	–	19	.367
New Hampshire	6	–	10	.375	12	–	18	.400
Vermont	4	–	12	.250	9	–	21	.300
UMass Lowell*	1	–	15	.063	4	–	24	.143
† 2016 America East tournament winner As of March 20, 2016 *ineligible for postseason play due to Div. I transitions Rankings from AP poll

The 2015–16 New Hampshire Wildcats women's basketball team represented the University of New Hampshire in the America East Conference. The Wildcats were led by sixth-year head coach Maureen Magarity and played their home games in Lundholm Gym. They finished the season 12–18, 6–10 in America East play to finish in seventh place. They lost in the quarterfinals of the America East women's tournament to Maine.

== Media ==
All non-televised home games and conference road games were streamed on either ESPN3 or AmericaEast.tv. Select home games aired on Fox College Sports, Live Well Network, or WBIN. Most road games were streamed on the opponent's website. All conference home games and select non-conference home games were broadcast on the radio on WPKX and WGIR, and online on the New Hampshire Portal.

== Roster ==
2014–15 New Hampshire Wildcats women's basketball team
Players
Coaches

Pos.	#	Name	Height	Year	Previous school	Hometown
G	2	Brittni Lai (I) (redshirt)	5 ft 6 in (1.68 m)	Jr	Irvington; Marist	Irvington, NY
G	4	Kristen Anderson	5 ft 7 in (1.7 m)	Jr	Leavitt	Greene, ME
G	5	Elizabeth Belanger (C)	5 ft 10 in (1.78 m)	Sr	Acton-Boxborough Regional	Acton, MA
G	10	Aliza Simpson	5 ft 9 in (1.75 m)	So	Londonderry	Londonderry, NH
F/C	11	Ashley Storey	6 ft 3 in (1.91 m)	Fr	Greely	Cumberland, ME
G	12	Peyton Booth	5 ft 10 in (1.78 m)	So	Wadsworth	Mansfield, OH
G	13	Sam Sabino	5 ft 8 in (1.73 m)	Fr	Rumson Fair Haven	Rumson, NJ
F	15	Corinne Coia (C)	6 ft 4 in (1.93 m)	RS Sr	The Lincoln School; Rhode Island	North Smithfield, RI
G/F	21	Alli Gribbin	5 ft 11 in (1.8 m)	Fr	Keller	Keller, TX
F	24	Raven Brathwaite	6 ft 4 in (1.93 m)	Fr	Brookline	Boston, MA
G	25	Emily Peters	5 ft 6 in (1.68 m)	RS Fr	Forest Lake	Lindstrom, MN
C	32	Carlie Pogue	6 ft 2 in (1.88 m)	So	Princeton	Cincinnati, OH
G/F	33	Stephanie Spoto	6 ft 0 in (1.83 m)	RS Sr	The Governor's Academy	Pittsford, NY
F	35	Kat Fogarty	6 ft 2 in (1.88 m)	Jr	Pittsford Sutherland; Marist	Peterborough, NH
C	50	Morgan Bassett-Smith	6 ft 2 in (1.88 m)	Fr	Pickerington North	Pickerington, OH

Head coach

- Maureen Magarity (Marist)

Assistant coach(es)

- Brendan Copes (Marist)
- Kelsey Hogan (New Hampshire)
- Whitney Edwards (New Hampshire)

Legend

- (C) Team captain
- (S) Suspended
- (I) Ineligible
- (W) Walk-on
- Injured
- Current redshirt

Roster

== Schedule ==
Date time, TV	Rank^{#}	Opponent^{#}	Result	Record	Site (attendance) city, state
Non-conference regular season
11/13/2015*; 5:00 pm		Colby–Sawyer College	W 72–41	1–0	Lundholm Gym (386); Durham, NH
11/16/2015*; 7:00 pm		at Dartmouth; Rivalry	W 61–57	2–0	Leede Arena (475); Durham, NH
11/18/2015*; 7:00 pm		at Sacred Heart	W 81–69	3–0	William H. Pitt Center (246); Fairfield, CT
11/22/2015*; 1:00 pm		Penn	L 60–67	3–1	Lundholm Gym (393); Durham, NH
11/24/2015*; 7:00 pm		Manhattan	W 72–57	4–1	Lundholm Gym (281); Durham, NH
11/29/2015*; 1:00 pm		at Central Connecticut	W 64–50	5–1	William H. Detrick Gymnasium; New Britain, CT
12/02/2015*; 4:00 pm		Northeastern	L 54–66	5–2	Lundholm Gym (184); Durham, NH
12/05/2015*; 4:00 pm		Boston University	W 69–52	6–2	Lundholm Gym (260); Durham, NH
12/09/2015*; 7:00 pm		Siena	L 53–57	6–3	Lundholm Gym (202); Durham, NH
12/13/2015*; 1:00 pm		at Boston College	L 51–71	6–4	Conte Forum (614); Chestnut Hill, MA
12/20/2015*; 1:00 pm		at Bryant	L 42–55	6–5	Chace Athletic Center (217); Smithfield, RI
12/29/2015*; 2:00 pm		at North Carolina	L 60–65	6–6	Carmichael Arena (1,646); Chapel Hill, NC
01/02/2016*; 2:00 pm		at Yale	L 46–63	6–7	John J. Lee Amphitheater (208); New Haven, CT
America East regular season
01/09/2016; 4:00 pm		at Binghamton	L 50–51	6–8 (0–1)	Binghamton University Events Center (1,507); Vestal, NY
01/13/2016; 12:00 pm		Albany	L 52–78	6–9 (0–2)	Lundholm Gym (1,537); Durham, NH
01/16/2016; 2:00 pm		at Stony Brook	L 54–63	6–10 (0–3)	Island Federal Credit Union Arena (711); Stony Brook, NY
01/18/2016; 3:00 pm, ESPN3		Maine	L 52–62	6–11 (0–4)	Lundholm Gym (407); Durham, NH
01/21/2016; 7:00 pm		UMass Lowell	W 65–61	7–11 (1–4)	Lundholm Gym (261); Durham, NH
01/24/2016; 12:00 pm, ESPN3		at Hartford	L 44–48	7–12 (1–5)	Chase Arena at Reich Family Pavilion (1,091); Hartford, CT
01/27/2016; 7:00 pm		at Vermont	L 63–83	7–13 (1–6)	Patrick Gym (447); Burlington, VT
01/30/2016; 1:00 pm, WBIN		UMBC	L 55–65	7–14 (1–7)	Lundholm Gym (277); Durham, NH
02/06/2016; 1:00 pm, FCS		Binghamton	W 64–49	8–14 (2–7)	Lundholm Gym (491); Durham, NH
02/11/2016; 7:00 pm		at Maine	L 55–59	8–15 (2–8)	Cross Insurance Center (1,439); Bangor, ME
02/11/2016; 12:00 pm		at Albany	L 48–75	8–16 (2–9)	SEFCU Arena (3,016); Albany, NY
02/14/2016; 1:00 pm		Stony Brook	W 49–46	9–16 (3–9)	Lundholm Gym (414); Durham, NH
02/17/2016; 7:00 pm		at UMass Lowell	W 63–55	10–16 (4–9)	Tsongas Center (1,992); Lowell, MA
02/20/2016; 1:00 pm		Hartford	W 53–42	11–16 (5–9)	Lundholm Gym (384); Durham, NH
02/25/2016; 7:00 pm		Vermont	L 59–63	11–17 (5–10)	Lundholm Gym (313); Durham, NH
02/28/2016; 1:00 pm		at UMBC	W 67–59	12–17 (6–10)	Retriever Activities Center (691); Catonsville, MD
America East Women's Tournament
03/05/2016; 12:00 pm, ESPN3		vs. Maine; Quarterfinals	L 48–57	12–18	Binghamton University Events Center; Vestal, NY
*Non-conference game. ^{#}Rankings from AP Poll. (#) Tournament seedings in parentheses. All times are in Eastern Time.

== See also ==
- 2015–16 New Hampshire Wildcats men's basketball team
