= 2015–16 Maine Black Bears women's basketball team =

Intercollegiate basketball season

2015–16 Maine Black Bears women's basketball

America East Regular Season Co-Champions

WNIT, First Round
- Conference: America East Conference
- Record: 26–9 (15–1 America East)
- Head coach: Richard Barron (5th season)
- Assistant coaches: Todd Steelman; Amy Vachon; Edniesha Curry
- Home arena: Cross Insurance Center

2015–16 America East Conference women's basketball standings
	Conf.				Overall
Team	W		L	PCT	W		L	PCT
Albany †	15	–	1	.938	28	–	5	.848
Maine	15	–	1	.938	26	–	9	.743
UMBC	8	–	8	.500	18	–	14	.563
Stony Brook	8	–	8	.500	17	–	15	.531
Binghamton	8	–	8	.500	14	–	17	.452
Hartford	7	–	9	.438	11	–	19	.367
New Hampshire	6	–	10	.375	12	–	18	.400
Vermont	4	–	12	.250	9	–	21	.300
UMass Lowell*	1	–	15	.063	4	–	24	.143
† 2016 America East tournament winner As of March 20, 2016 *ineligible for postseason play due to Div. I transitions Rankings from AP poll

The 2015–16 Maine Black Bears women's basketball team represented the University of Maine in the America East Conference. The Black Bears were led by fifth year head coach Richard Barron and played their home games at the Cross Insurance Center. They finished the season 26–9, 15–1 in America East play to share the America East regular season title with Albany. They advanced to the championship game of the America East women's tournament, where they lost to Albany. As champs of the America East Conference who failed to win their conference tournament, they received an automatic bid to the Women's National Invitation Tournament, where they lost to Quinnipiac in the first round.

== Media ==
All home games and conference road games will stream on either ESPN3 or AmericaEast.tv. Most road games will stream on the opponents website. All games will be broadcast on the radio on WGUY and online on the Maine Portal.

== Roster ==
2015–16 Maine Black Bears women's basketball team
Players
Coaches

Pos.	#	Name	Height	Year	Previous school	Hometown
G	3	Chantel Charles	5 ft 10 in (1.78 m)	Sr	Barking Abbey	London, England
G	5	Maddy McVicar	5 ft 4 in (1.63 m)	Fr	Calais	Calais, ME
F	5	Bella Swan	5 ft 11 in (1.8 m)	Sr	Viewmont; Salt Lake CC	Farmington, UT
G	10	Milica Mitrovic	5 ft 9 in (1.75 m)	Sr	Sports Gymnasium Belgrade	Belgrade, Serbia
G	12	Tanesha Sutton (I) (redshirt)	5 ft 10 in (1.78 m)	So	Ss. Neumann and Goretti; Duquesne	Philadelphia, PA
F	13	Mikaela Gustafsson	6 ft 2 in (1.88 m)	Jr	Igelstavikens Gymnasium; Telge Basket; Kringlan Basket	Södertälje, Sweden
G	15	Lauren Bodine	5 ft 8 in (1.73 m)	Sr	duPont Manuel	Louisville, KY
G	20	Sophie Weckstrom	5 ft 8 in (1.73 m)	Sr	Brando Gymnasium; Torpan Pojat	Espoo, Finland
F	21	Sheraton Jones	5 ft 10 in (1.78 m)	Jr	Canyon	Anaheim Hills, CA
G	22	Parise Rossignol	5 ft 8 in (1.73 m)	So	Van Buren	Van Buren, ME
F	23	Christiana Gerostergiou	5 ft 10 in (1.78 m)	So	Aristotelio; National Team	Thessaloniki, Greece
F	31	Liz Wood	5 ft 10 in (1.78 m)	Sr	Liberty	Catlett, VA
G	32	Isabel Hernandez Pope	5 ft 11 in (1.8 m)	Fr	Polisportiva Battipagliese	Rome, Italy
F	33	Kirsten Johnson	6 ft 2 in (1.88 m)	So	Academy of Our Lady Peace	San Diego, CA
G	42	Sigi Koizar	5 ft 8 in (1.73 m)	Jr	Stearns; Billrothgymnasium	Vienna, Austria
F	51	Anna Heise	6 ft 3 in (1.91 m)	Sr	Sportschule Halle	Halle, Germany

Head coach

- Richard Barron (Kenyon)

Assistant coach(es)

- Todd Steelman (John Brown)
- Amy Vachon (Maine)
- Edniesha Curry (Oregon)

Legend

- (C) Team captain
- (S) Suspended
- (I) Ineligible
- (W) Walk-on
- Injured
- Current redshirt

Roster

== Schedule ==
Date time, TV	Rank^{#}	Opponent^{#}	Result	Record	Site (attendance) city, state
Exhibition
11/06/2015*; 7:00 pm		vs. Vanguard	W 70–55		Warren G. Hill Gymnasium (342); Gorham, ME
11/08/2015*; 4:00 pm		Stonehill	W 77–58		Cross Insurance Center (1,784); Bangor, ME
Non-conference regular season
11/13/2015*; 5:30 pm		at Harvard	W 64–53	1–0	Lavietes Pavilion (721); Cambridge, MA
11/15/2015*; 1:00 pm		at Boston College	L 48–55	1–1	Conte Forum (1,123); Chestnut Hill, MA
11/20/2015*; 8:00 pm		at Minnesota	L 64–91	1–2	Williams Arena (2,761); Minneapolis, MN
11/22/2015*; 1:00 pm		at North Dakota State	W 82–51	2–2	Bentson Bunker Fieldhouse (404); Fargo, ND
11/25/2015*; 12:00 pm		Central Connecticut	W 62–42	3–2	Cross Insurance Center (2,631); Bangor, ME
11/27/2015*; 11:00 am		vs. Dayton; Gulf Coast Showcase quarterfinals	L 37–58	3–3	Germain Arena; Estero, FL
11/28/2015*; 11:00 am		vs. Missouri State; Gulf Coast Showcase consolation 2nd round	W 69–65	4–3	Germain Arena; Estero, FL
11/29/2015*; 1:30 pm, CST		vs. LSU; Gulf Coast Showcase 5th place game	W 52–41	5–3	Germain Arena; Estero, FL
12/01/2015*; 7:00 pm		Colby	W 82–42	6–3	Cross Insurance Center (1,365); Bangor, ME
12/04/2015*; 12:00 pm		at Northeastern	L 44–56	6–4	Cabot Center (1,004); Boston, MA
12/06/2015*; 2:00 pm		at Dartmouth	W 59–41	7–4	Leede Arena (540); Hanover, NH
12/12/2015*; 1:00 pm		Bryant	W 76–38	8–4	Cross Insurance Center (1,533); Bangor, ME
12/18/2015*; 7:00 pm		Clemson	W 75–42	9–4	Cross Insurance Center (1,648); Bangor, ME
12/21/2015*; 7:00 pm		at Purdue	L 33–56	9–5	Mackey Arena (5,803); West Lafayette, IN
12/31/2015*; 1:00 pm		at North Carolina	L 58–59	9–6	Carmichael Arena (1,732); Chapel Hill, NC
America East regular season
01/06/2016; 7:00 pm		at Vermont	W 62–41	10–6 (1–0)	Patrick Gym (371); Burlington, VT
01/09/2016; 12:00 pm		UMBC	W 65–55	11–6 (2–0)	Cross Insurance Center (2,026); Bangor, ME
01/13/2016; 7:00 pm		UMass Lowell	W 74–44	12–6 (3–0)	Cross Insurance Center (1,403); Bangor, ME
01/16/2016; 12:00 pm, ESPN3		at Albany	L 59–64	12–7 (3–1)	SEFCU Arena (986); Albany, NY
01/18/2016; 3:00 pm, ESPN3		at New Hampshire	W 62–52	13–7 (4–1)	Lundholm Gym (407); Durham, NH
01/24/2016; 1:00 pm		Stony Brook	W 55–52	14–7 (5–1)	Cross Insurance Center (2,123); Bangor, ME
01/27/2016; 7:00 pm		Hartford	W 61–43	15–7 (6–1)	Cross Insurance Center (1,559); Bangor, ME
01/30/2016; 2:00 pm		at Binghamton	W 52–38	16–7 (7–1)	Binghamton University Events Center (1,575); Vestal, NY
02/03/2016; 7:00 pm		Vermont	W 63–51	17–7 (8–1)	Cross Insurance Center (1,666); Bangor, ME
02/06/2016; 1:00 pm		at UMBC	W 72–38	18–7 (9–1)	Retriever Activities Center (608); Catonsville, MD
02/08/2016; 7:00 pm		New Hampshire	W 59–55	19–7 (10–1)	Cross Insurance Center (1,439); Bangor, ME
02/11/2016; 7:00 pm		at UMass Lowell	W 73–46	20–7 (11–1)	Costello Athletic Center (321); Lowell, MA
02/14/2016; 1:00 pm, ESPN3		Albany	W 65–53	21–7 (12–1)	Cross Insurance Center (3,231); Bangor, ME
02/20/2016; 2:00 pm, ESPN3		at Stony Brook	W 60–42	22–7 (13–1)	Island Federal Credit Union Arena (1,042); Stony Brook, NY
02/24/2016; 7:00 pm		at Hartford	W 50–44	23–7 (14–1)	Chase Arena at Reich Family Pavilion (1,701); Hartford, CT
02/27/2016; 1:00 pm		Binghamton	W 69–37	24–7 (15–1)	Cross Insurance Center (1,575); Bangor, ME
America East Women's Tournament
03/05/2016; 12:00 pm, ESPN3		vs. New Hampshire; Quarterfinals	W 57–48	25–7	Binghamton University Events Center; Vestal, NY
03/06/2016; 2:00 pm, ESPN3		vs. Stony Brook; Semifinals	W 51–48	26–7	Binghamton University Events Center; Vestal, NY
03/11/2016; 4:30 pm, ESPNU		at Albany; Championship Game	L 58–59	26–8	SEFCU Arena (1,519); Albany, NY
WNIT
03/18/2016*; 7:00 pm		at Quinnipiac; First Round	L 44–90	26–9	TD Bank Sports Center (437); Hamden, CT
*Non-conference game. ^{#}Rankings from AP Poll. (#) Tournament seedings in parentheses. All times are in Eastern Time.

== See also ==
- 2015–16 Maine Black Bears men's basketball team
- Maine Black Bears women's basketball
