= 2016 America East women's basketball tournament =

- Classification: Division I
- Season: 2015–16
- Teams: 8
- Quarterfinals site: Binghamton University Events Center; Binghamton, NY
- Semifinals site: Binghamton University Events Center; Binghamton, NY
- Finals site: SEFCU Arena; Albany, NY
- Champions: Albany (5th title)
- Winning coach: Katie Abrahamson-Henderson (5th title)
- MVP: Shereesha Richards (Albany)
- Attendance: 6,503
- Television: ESPNU/ESPN3
- America East women's basketball tournaments

2015–16 America East Conference women's basketball standings
	Conf.				Overall
Team	W		L	PCT	W		L	PCT
Albany †	15	–	1	.938	28	–	5	.848
Maine	15	–	1	.938	26	–	9	.743
UMBC	8	–	8	.500	18	–	14	.563
Stony Brook	8	–	8	.500	17	–	15	.531
Binghamton	8	–	8	.500	14	–	17	.452
Hartford	7	–	9	.438	11	–	19	.367
New Hampshire	6	–	10	.375	12	–	18	.400
Vermont	4	–	12	.250	9	–	21	.300
UMass Lowell*	1	–	15	.063	4	–	24	.143
† 2016 America East tournament winner As of March 20, 2016 *ineligible for postseason play due to Div. I transitions Rankings from AP poll

The 2016 America East women's basketball tournament is a tournament that began March 5 and concluded with the championship game on March 11 at SEFCU Arena. Albany defeated Maine in the championship game to win their fifth consecutive American East tournament title and earn an automatic trip NCAA women's tournament.

== Seeds ==
Teams are seeded by record within the conference, with a tiebreaker system to seed teams with identical conference records.

Seed	School	Conf (Overall)	Tiebreaker
#1	Albany	15–1 (24–4)	1–1 vs. Maine; higher RPI
#2	Maine	15–1 (24–7)	1–1 vs. Albany
#3	Stony Brook	8–8 (16–13)	2–2 vs. Binghamton, UMBC; 2–0 vs. Hartford
#4	UMBC	8–8 (17–12)	2–2 vs. Binghamton, Stony Brook; 4–4 in conference away games
#5	Binghamton	8–8 (13–15)	2–2 vs. UMBC, Stony Brook; 3–5 in conference away games
#6	Hartford	7–9 (11–18)	
#7	New Hampshire	6–10 (12–17)	
#8	Vermont	4–12 (9–20)	

== Schedule ==
All tournament games are nationally televised on an ESPN network:

Session	Game	Time*	Matchup^{#}	Television	Attendance
Quarterfinals – Saturday, March 5
1	1	12:00 PM	#2 Maine vs. #7 New Hampshire	ESPN3	2,080
1	2	2:15 PM	#3 Stony Brook vs. #6 Hartford	ESPN3	2,080
2	3	6:00 PM	#1 Albany vs. #8 Vermont	ESPN3	2,080
2	4	8:15 PM	#4 UMBC vs. #5 Binghamton	ESPN3	2,080
Semifinals – Sunday, March 6
3	5	2:00 PM	#2 Maine vs. #3 Stony Brook	ESPN3	2,904
3	6	4:15 PM	#1 Albany vs. #5 Binghamton	ESPN3	2,904
Championship Game – Friday, March 11
4	7	4:30 PM	#1 Albany vs. #2 Maine	ESPNU	1,519
*Game Times in EST. #-Rankings denote tournament seeding.

== Bracket and Results ==
Quarterfinals; Saturday, March 5, 2016; ESPN3
3	Stony Brook	60
6	Hartford	42
2	Maine	57
7	New Hampshire	48
1	Albany	95
8	Vermont	43
4	UMBC	41
5	Binghamton	49

Semifinals; Sunday, March 6, 2016; ESPN3
3	Stony Brook	48
2	Maine	51
1	Albany	79
5	Binghamton	43

Championship Game; Friday, March 11, 2016; ESPNU
2	Maine	58
1	Albany	59

All times listed are Eastern

== See also ==
- America East Conference
- 2016 America East men's basketball tournament
