= 2015–16 Marist Red Foxes women's basketball team =

Intercollegiate basketball season

2015–16 Marist Red Foxes women's basketball
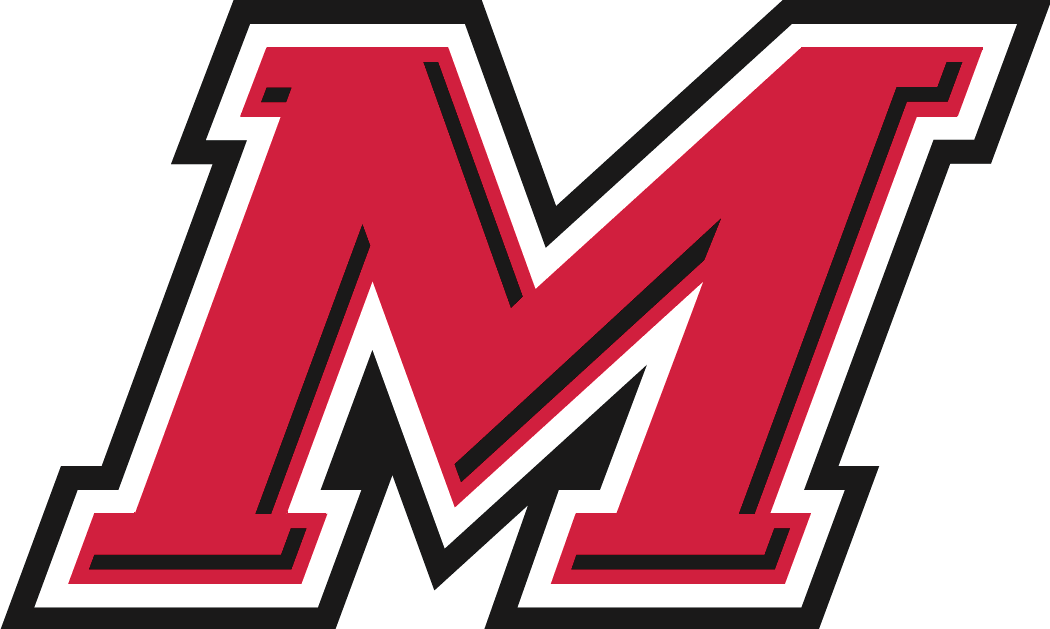
- Conference: Metro Atlantic Athletic Conference
- Record: 16–16 (14–6 MAAC)
- Head coach: Brian Giorgis (14th season)
- Assistant coaches: Erin Doughty; Alisa Kresge; Dominique Bryant
- Home arena: McCann Arena

2015–16 MAAC women's basketball standings
	Conf.				Overall
Team	W		L	PCT	W		L	PCT
Quinnipiac	17	–	3	.850	25	–	9	.735
Iona †	16	–	4	.800	23	–	12	.657
Marist	14	–	6	.700	16	–	16	.500
Fairfield	11	–	9	.550	16	–	14	.533
Manhattan	11	–	9	.550	14	–	16	.467
Monmouth	11	–	9	.550	14	–	17	.452
Siena	10	–	10	.500	14	–	18	.438
Canisius	8	–	12	.400	13	–	17	.433
Niagara	5	–	15	.250	8	–	22	.267
Rider	5	–	15	.250	8	–	22	.267
St. Peter's	2	–	18	.100	4	–	26	.133
† 2016 MAAC tournament winner As of March 20, 2016; Rankings from AP poll

The 2015–16 Marist Red Foxes women's basketball team represented Marist College during the 2015–16 NCAA Division I men's basketball season. The Red Foxes, led by fourteenth year head coach Brian Giorgis, play their home games at the McCann Arena and were members of the Metro Atlantic Athletic Conference. They finished the season 16–16, 14–6 in MAAC play to finish in third place. They advanced to the semifinals of the MAAC women's tournament where they lost to Iona.

== Roster ==
2015–16 Marist Red Foxes women's basketball team
Players
Coaches

Pos.	#	Name	Height	Year	Previous school	Hometown
G	1	Claire Oberdorf	5 ft 5 in (1.65 m)	Fr	Greensburg Salem	Greensburg, PA
G	2	Eileen Van Horn	5 ft 8 in (1.73 m)	Sr	Waukesha South	Waukesha, WI
G	4	Allie Clement	5 ft 8 in (1.73 m)	So	Catherine McAuley	Falmouth, ME
G	5	Sydney Coffey	6 ft 0 in (1.83 m)	Sr	Hopkins	Hopkins, MN
G	10	Maura Fitzpatrick	5 ft 11 in (1.8 m)	Fr	Mercy	Cheshire, CT
G	11	Casey Davidson	5 ft 11 in (1.8 m)	Fr	St. Joseph by the Sea	Staten Island, NY
G	14	Jordyn Jossart (redshirt)	5 ft 9 in (1.75 m)	Fr	Century High School	Bismarck, ND
F	15	Kendall Baab	6 ft 2 in (1.88 m)	So	Chaska High School	Chaska, MN
G	21	Rebecka Garderyd	5 ft 8 in (1.73 m)	Fr	Luleå Gymnasieskola	Stockholm, Sweden
F	22	Morgan Bartner	6 ft 2 in (1.88 m)	Fr	Morristown-Beard School	Florham Park, NJ
G	23	Morgan Metcalf (redshirt)	5 ft 8 in (1.73 m)	Jr	Pomperaug High School	Middlebury, CT
G	24	Sydnie Rosales	5 ft 9 in (1.75 m)	Jr	Colonie	Loudonville, NY
F	25	Lovísa Henningsdóttir	6 ft 2 in (1.88 m)	Fr	The Rock of Gainesville (FL)	Hafnarfjörður, Iceland
C	44	Tori Jarosz	6 ft 3 in (1.91 m)	Sr	Lakeland School	Cortlandt Manor, NY

Head coach

- Brian Giorgis (SUNY Cortland)

Assistant coach(es)

- Erin Doughty (Marist)
- Alisa Kresge (Marist)
- Dominique Bryant (Saint Joseph's)

Legend

- (C) Team captain
- (S) Suspended
- (I) Ineligible
- (W) Walk-on
- Injured
- Current redshirt

Roster

== Schedule ==
Date time, TV	Rank^{#}	Opponent^{#}	Result	Record	Site (attendance) city, state
Regular season
November 13, 2015*; 7:00 p.m.		at South Dakota State	L 68–77	0–1	Frost Arena (1,624); Brookings, SD
November 15, 2015*; 12:05 p.m.		at Creighton	L 46–89	0–2	D. J. Sokol Arena (535); Omaha, NE
November 19, 2015*; 7:00 p.m.		Delaware	L 50–56	0–3	McCann Arena (1,404); Poughkeepsie, NY
November 22, 2015*; 7:00 p.m.		at St. John's	L 47–61	0–4	Carnesecca Arena (611); Queens, NY
November 27, 2015*; 5:00 p.m.		vs. No. 22 Louisville; Gulf Coast Showcase	L 53–65	0–5	Germain Arena (1,257); Estero, FL
November 28, 2015*; 1:30 p.m.		vs. Louisiana State; Gulf Coast Showcase	L 49–72	0–6	Germain Arena (1,015); Estero, FL
November 29, 2015*; 11:00 a.m.		vs. Missouri State; Gulf Coast Showcase	L 45–77	0–7	Germain Arena; Estero, FL
December 3, 2015; 7:00 p.m.		Quinnipiac	W 5647	1–7 (1–0)	McCann Arena (1,465); Poughkeepsie, NY
December 6, 2015; 2:00 p.m.		at Fairfield	W 72–57	2–7 (2–0)	Alumni Hall (258); Fairfield, CT
December 12, 2015*; 2:00 p.m.		at Boston University	W 73–54	3–7	Case Gym (280); Boston, MA
December 20, 2015*; 2:00 p.m.		Hofstra	L 67–71	3–8	McCann Arena (1,352); Poughkeepsie, NY
December 29, 2015*; 7:00 p.m.		Princeton	L 44–77	3–9	McCann Arena (1,358); Poughkeepsie, NY
January 3, 2016; 2:00 p.m.		Rider	W 66–54	4–9 (3–0)	McCann Arena (1,662); Poughkeepsie, NY
January 7, 2016; 5:00 p.m.		at Iona	L 49–69	4–10 (3–1)	Hynes Athletic Center; New Rochelle, NY
January 10, 2016; 2:00 p.m.		at Monmouth	L 52–60	4–11 (3–2)	Multipurpose Activity Center (445); West Long Branch, NJ
January 12, 2016; 11:00 a.m.		at Manhattan	W 79–73	5–11 (4–2)	Draddy Gymnasium (1,208); Riverdale, NY
January 15, 2016; 7:00 p.m.		Iona	W 62–61	6–11 (5–2)	McCann Arena (1,685); Poughkeepsie, NY
January 17, 2016; 2:00 p.m.		Monmouth	W 78–55	7–11 (6–2)	McCann Arena (1,685); Poughkeepsie, NY
January 23, 2016; 7:00 p.m.		Niagara	W 63–50	8–11 (7–2)	McCann Arena (1,475); Poughkeepsie, NY
January 25, 2016; 7:00 p.m.		Saint Peter's	W 69–46	9–11 (8–2)	McCann Arena (1,329); Poughkeepsie, NY
January 28, 2016; 5:00 p.m.		Siena	W 66–37	10–11 (9–2)	McCann Arena (1,413); Poughkeepsie, NY
January 30, 2016; 7:00 p.m.		at Rider	W 74–56	11–11 (10–2)	Alumni Gymnasium (344); Lawrenceville, NJ
February 5, 2016; 7:00 p.m.		at Saint Peter's	W 74–55	12–11 (11–2)	Yanitelli Center; Jersey City, NJ
February 8, 2016; 7:00 p.m.		Manhattan	L 59–64	12–12 (11–3)	McCann Arena (1.412); Poughkeepsie, NY
February 12, 2016; 7:00 p.m.		at Niagara	W 82–68	13–12 (12–3)	Gallagher Center (299); Lewiston, NY
February 14, 2016; 2:00 p.m.		at Canisius	L 69–71	13–13 (12–4)	Koessler Athletic Center (665); Buffalo, NY
February 18, 2016; 5:00 p.m.		at Quinnipiac	L 71–76	13–14 (12–5)	TD Bank Sports Center (912); Hamden, CT
February 21, 2016; 2:00 p.m.		Fairfield	W 64–63	14–14 (13–5)	McCann Arena (2,010); Poughkeepsie, NY
February 25, 2016; 7:00 p.m.		at Siena	L 56–60	14–15 (13–6)	Alumni Recreation Center (411); Loudonville, NY
February 27, 2016; 7:00 p.m.		Canisius	W 67–55	15–15 (14–6)	McCann Arena (3,200); Poughkeepsie, NY
MAAC Women's Tournament
March 5, 2016; 12:00 p.m., ESPN3	(3)	vs. (6) Manhattan; Quarterfinals	W 70–58	16–15	Times Union Center (2,844); Albany, NY
March 6, 2016; 1:30 p.m.	(3)	vs. (2) Iona; Semifinals	L 53–57	16–16	Times Union Center; Albany, NY
*Non-conference game. ^{#}Rankings from AP Poll. (#) Tournament seedings in parentheses. All times are in Eastern Time.

== See also ==
- 2015–16 Marist Red Foxes men's basketball team
