= 2015–16 Binghamton Bearcats women's basketball team =

American college basketball season

2015–16 Binghamton Bearcats women's basketball
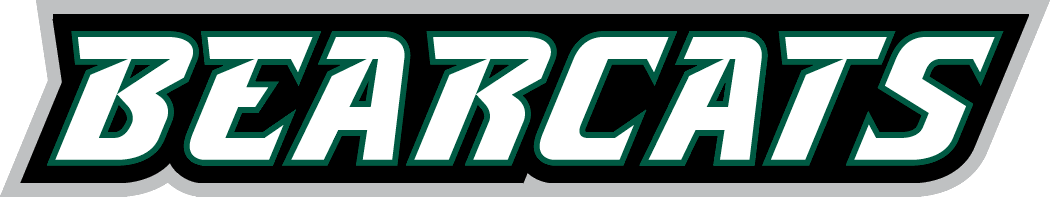
- Conference: America East Conference
- Record: 14–17 (8–8 America East)
- Head coach: Linda Cimino (2nd season)
- Assistant coaches: Torey Northup-Jones; Leah Truncale
- Home arena: Binghamton University Events Center

2015–16 America East Conference women's basketball standings
	Conf.				Overall
Team	W		L	PCT	W		L	PCT
Albany †	15	–	1	.938	28	–	5	.848
Maine	15	–	1	.938	26	–	9	.743
UMBC	8	–	8	.500	18	–	14	.563
Stony Brook	8	–	8	.500	17	–	15	.531
Binghamton	8	–	8	.500	14	–	17	.452
Hartford	7	–	9	.438	11	–	19	.367
New Hampshire	6	–	10	.375	12	–	18	.400
Vermont	4	–	12	.250	9	–	21	.300
UMass Lowell*	1	–	15	.063	4	–	24	.143
† 2016 America East tournament winner As of March 20, 2016 *ineligible for postseason play due to Div. I transitions Rankings from AP poll

The 2015–16 Binghamton Bearcats women's basketball team represented Binghamton University during the 2015–16 NCAA Division I women's basketball season. The Bearcats were led by second year head coach Linda Cimino and played their home games at Binghamton University Events Center. They were members of the America East Conference. They finished the season 14–17, 8–8 in America East play to finish in a 3-way tie for fourth place. They advanced to the semifinals of the America East women's tournament where they lost to Albany.

== Media ==
All home games and conference road games will stream on either ESPN3 or AmericaEast.tv. Most road games will stream on the opponents website. All games will be broadcast on the radio on WNBF and streamed online.

== Roster ==
2015–16 Binghamton Bearcats women's basketball team
Players
Coaches

Pos.	#	Name	Height	Year	Previous school	Hometown
G	3	Tess Wicks	5 ft 11 in (1.8 m)	Jr	Horseheads	Horseheads, NY
F	5	Alyssa James	6 ft 1 in (1.85 m)	Jr	St. Mary's (Caldwell)	Rosedale, NY
G	10	Jasmine Sina	5 ft 5 in (1.65 m)	So	Gill-St. Bernards	Lake Hoptacong, NJ
G	11	Imani Watkins	5 ft 8 in (1.73 m)	So	Wingate Andrews	High Point, NC
G	12	McKayla Hernandez	5 ft 6 in (1.68 m)	Fr	St. Mary's	Manhasset, NY
F	13	Kennedi Thompson	6 ft 0 in (1.83 m)	Fr	Gloucester Catholic	Mullica Hill, NJ
G	23	Kim Albrecht	5 ft 7 in (1.7 m)	Sr	Deerfield	Deerfield, WI
F	24	Kristin Ross	6 ft 0 in (1.83 m)	Jr	Gorham	Gorham, ME
F	31	Corrinne Godshall	5 ft 11 in (1.8 m)	Fr	Central Bucks West	Doylestown, PA
G	33	Rebecca Carmody	5 ft 8 in (1.73 m)	Fr	Western Wayne	Waymart, PA
F	34	Kylie Libby	6 ft 0 in (1.83 m)	Jr	Cheverus	South Portland, ME

Head coach

- Linda Cimino (Adelphi)

Assistant coach(es)

- Torey Northup-Jones (Caldwell)
- Leah Truncale (Binghamton)

Legend

- (C) Team captain
- (S) Suspended
- (I) Ineligible
- (W) Walk-on
- Injured
- Current redshirt

Roster

== Schedule ==
Date time, TV	Rank^{#}	Opponent^{#}	Result	Record	Site (attendance) city, state
Exhibition
11/06/2015*; 5:30 pm		East Stroudsburg	W 66–59		Binghamton University Events Center; Vestal, NY
Non-conference regular season
11/14/2015*; 12:00 pm		at Michigan	L 62–90	0–1	Crisler Center (1,906); Ann Arbor, MI
11/16/2015*; 7:00 pm		NJIT	W 54–50	1–1	Binghamton University Events Center (1,374); Vestal, NY
11/18/2015*; 7:00 pm		at Bucknell	L 46–76	1–2	Sojka Pavilion (347); Lewisburg, PA
11/21/2015*; 2:00 pm		Cedar Crest College	W 74–18	2–2	Binghamton University Events Center (1,395); Vestal, NY
11/25/2015*; 7:00 pm		at Canisius	L 50–80	2–3	Koessler Athletic Center (583); Buffalo, NY
11/28/2015*; 2:00 pm		at Xavier	L 55–64	2–4	Cintas Center (610); Cincinnati, OH
12/03/2015*; 7:00 pm		at Brown	L 65–67	2–5	Pizzitola Sports Center (202); Providence, RI
12/07/2015*; 7:00 pm		Colgate	W 63–56	3–5	Binghamton University Events Center (1,142); Vestal, NY
12/09/2015*; 7:00 pm		at Columbia	L 64–71	3–6	Levien Gymnasium (305); New York City, NY
12/12/2015*; 1:00 pm		at Sacred Heart	L 60–69	3–7	William H. Pitt Center (312); Fairfield, CT
12/15/2015*; 5:00 pm		Nyack College	W 65–33	4–7	Binghamton University Events Center (1,870); Vestal, NY
12/30/2015*; 7:00 pm		at Cornell	L 57–64	4–8	Newman Arena (472); Ithaca, NY
01/04/2016*; 7:00 pm		Misericordia	W 73–44	5–8	Binghamton University Events Center (1,135); Vestal, NY
American East regular season
01/06/2016; 12:00 pm		at Stony Brook	L 58–64	5–9 (0–1)	Island Federal Credit Union Arena (1,045); Stony Brook, NY
01/09/2016; 4:00 pm		New Hampshire	W 51–50	6–9 (1–1)	Binghamton University Events Center (1,507); Vestal, NY
01/13/2016; 7:00 pm		at Hartford	W 53–47	7–9 (2–1)	Chase Arena at Reich Family Pavilion (825); Hartford, CT
01/18/2016; 7:00 pm		Albany	L 47–59	7–10 (2–2)	Binghamton University Events Center (1,775); Vestal, NY
01/21/2016; 7:00 pm		at Vermont	W 57–53	8–10 (3–2)	Patrick Gym (427); Burlington, VT
01/24/2016; 11:00 am		at UMass Lowell	W 75–70 ^{OT}	9–10 (4–2)	Tsongas Center (1,272); Lowell, MA
01/27/2016; 7:00 pm		at UMBC	L 51–62	9–11 (4–3)	Retriever Activities Center (691); Catonsville, MD
01/30/2016; 2:00 pm		Maine	L 38–52	9–12 (4–4)	Binghamton University Events Center (1,575); Vestal, NY
02/03/2016; 7:00 pm		Stony Brook	W 54–47	10–12 (4–5)	Binghamton University Events Center (1,193); Vestal, NY
02/06/2016; 1:00 pm, FCS		at New Hampshire	L 49–64	10–13 (5–5)	Lundholm Gym (491); Durham, NH
02/08/2016; 2:00 pm		at Albany	L 58–64	10–14 (5–6)	SEFCU Arena (1,403); Albany, NY
02/11/2016; 7:00 pm		Hartford	L 39–41	10–15 (5–7)	Binghamton University Events Center (1,266); Vestal, NY
02/16/2016; 7:00 pm		Vermont	W 66–52	11–15 (6–7)	Binghamton University Events Center (1,305); Vestal, NY
02/20/2016; 2:00 pm		UMass Lowell	W 55–52	12–15 (7–7)	Binghamton University Events Center (2,284); Vestal, NY
02/24/2016; 7:00 pm		UMBC	W 70–56	13–15 (8–7)	Binghamton University Events Center (1,442); Vestal, NY
02/27/2016; 1:00 pm		at Maine	L 37–69	13–16 (8–8)	Cross Insurance Center (1,575); Bangor, ME
America East Women's Tournament
03/05/2016; 8:15 pm, ESPN3		vs. UMBC; Quarterfinals	W 49–41	14–16	Binghamton University Events Center (2,080); Vestal, NY
03/06/2016; 4:15 pm, ESPN3		vs. Albany; Semifinals	L 43–79	14–17	Binghamton University Events Center (2,904); Vestal, NY
*Non-conference game. ^{#}Rankings from AP Poll. (#) Tournament seedings in parentheses. All times are in Eastern Time.

== See also ==
- 2015–16 Binghamton Bearcats men's basketball team
