= Lori Gear McBride =

American basketball coach

Biographical details
- Born: July 27, 1974 (age 52)
- Education: North Carolina

Coaching career (HC unless noted)
- 2005–2010: Colby
- 2010–2016: Vermont

Lori Gear McBride (born July 27, 1974) a Canadian-American basketball player and coach, and former head coach of the University of Vermont Catamounts women's basketball team.

== Playing career ==
Gear McBride was born in Lennoxville, Quebec (now Sherbrooke, Quebec), and played scholastically at Alexander Galt HS and Champlain College before accepting a scholarship to the University of North Carolina. She helped the Tar Heels to the 1994 National Championship and later served as captain in both her junior and senior seasons, leading UNC to three ACC titles during her four years in Chapel Hill.

== Coaching career ==
After one season playing professionally in Portugal, she started her coaching career at Seton Hall University, spending 6 years at the BIG EAST school, including two as Assistant Head Coach. After one season at UNC-Charlotte, she took a head coaching position at Scotch Plains-Fanwood High School in NJ, and then accepted the job at Colby prior to the 2004–05 season, building a program from a 6–17 mark to a 24–5 record in her final season, though only held a 62–65 record at the school.

In May 2010, she accepted the head coaching position at the University of Vermont, becoming the only Canadian women's basketball coach at the, Division I level.

In her six years with the Catamounts, Gear McBride only amassed a double-digit season win total twice, and lost 20 games in each of her six seasons at the helm. The team's highest finish in America East play was a tie for fourth place during the 2012–13 season, with a 6–10 conference record. Despite four 20-loss campaigns, University of Vermont Athletic Director Dr. Robert Corran signed Gear McBride to a four-year contract extension, which runs through the 2018 season. On March 25, 2016, Gear McBride was fired from the University of Vermont with an overall record of 46–134, and two years remaining on her contract. Gear McBride's tenure culminated worst winning percentage of any University of Vermont women's basketball coach (.257) since the 1984–85, when women's basketball became an officially sponsored sport by the America East.

== Personal life ==
McBride is currently the Assistant Athletic Director for External Relations at Dartmouth College. She is married to Pat McBride, the former Director of Major Gifts for the athletic department at the University of Vermont.

== Head coaching record ==
=== NCAA DIII ===
Record table
Season	Team	Overall	Conference	Standing	Postseason
Colby College (NESCAC) (2005–2010)
2005-06	Colby College	10-15	2-7	8th	
2006-07	Colby College	6-17	1-8	9th	
2007-08	Colby College	9-16	2-7	T-8th	
2008-09	Colby College	13-12	4-5	T-5th	
2009-10	Colby College	24-5	7-2	2nd	NCAA Division III Second Round
Colby College:		62–65 (.488)	16–30 (.348)		
Total:		62–65 (.488)			
National champion Postseason invitational champion Conference regular season champion Conference regular season and conference tournament champion Division regular season champion Division regular season and conference tournament champion Conference tournament champion

=== NCAA DI ===
Record table
Season	Team	Overall	Conference	Standing	Postseason
Vermont Catamounts (America East Conference) (2010–2016)
2010-11	Vermont	5-25	5-11	7th	
2011-12	Vermont	10-20	4-12	7th	
2012–13	Vermont	10-21	6-10	T-4th	
2013–14	Vermont	7-23	4-10	6th	
2014–15	Vermont	5-24	2-14	7th	
2015–16	Vermont	9-21	4-12	8th	
Vermont:		46–134 (.256)	25–69 (.266)		
Total:		46–134 (.256)			
National champion Postseason invitational champion Conference regular season champion Conference regular season and conference tournament champion Division regular season champion Division regular season and conference tournament champion Conference tournament champion
