= 2015–16 Niagara Purple Eagles women's basketball team =

American college basketball season

2015–16 Niagara Purple Eagles women's basketball
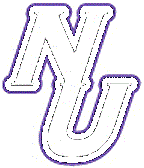
- Conference: Metro Atlantic Athletic Conference
- Record: 8–22 (5–15 MAAC)
- Head coach: Jada Pierce (1st season)
- Assistant coaches: Liberty Del Rosario; Jeff Dillon; Erika Harris
- Home arena: Gallagher Center

2015–16 MAAC women's basketball standings
	Conf.				Overall
Team	W		L	PCT	W		L	PCT
Quinnipiac	17	–	3	.850	25	–	9	.735
Iona †	16	–	4	.800	23	–	12	.657
Marist	14	–	6	.700	16	–	16	.500
Fairfield	11	–	9	.550	16	–	14	.533
Manhattan	11	–	9	.550	14	–	16	.467
Monmouth	11	–	9	.550	14	–	17	.452
Siena	10	–	10	.500	14	–	18	.438
Canisius	8	–	12	.400	13	–	17	.433
Niagara	5	–	15	.250	8	–	22	.267
Rider	5	–	15	.250	8	–	22	.267
St. Peter's	2	–	18	.100	4	–	26	.133
† 2016 MAAC tournament winner As of March 20, 2016; Rankings from AP poll

The 2015–16 Niagara Purple Eagles women's basketball team represented Niagara University during the 2015–16 NCAA Division I women's basketball season. The Purple Eagles, led by first year head coach Jada Pierce, played their home games at the Gallagher Center and were members of the Metro Atlantic Athletic Conference. They finished the season 8–22, 5–15 in MAAC play to finish in a tie for ninth place. They advanced to the quarterfinals of the MAAC women's tournament, where they lost to Quinnipiac.

== Roster ==
Number	Name	Position	Height	Year	Hometown
3	Tiffany Corselli	Guard	5–5	Junior	Yonkers, New York
10	Jamie Sherburne	Guard	5–7	Sophomore	Hudson, New Hampshire
11	Kharysma Bryant	Guard	5–8	Freshman	Rochester, New York
12	Taylor McKay	Guard	5–10	Senior	Lansing, Michigan
13	Jayla Nichols	Guard	5–7	Freshman	Lansing, Michigan
15	Taylor Wolf	Forward	6–0	Junior	Biloxi, Mississippi
22	Victoria Rampado	Forward	6–2	Junior	Niagara Falls, Ontario
25	Emily Granruth	Guard	5–11	Junior	Marshall, Virginia
42	Sam Lapszynski	Center	6–4	Senior	Jefferson, New Jersey
44	Kaylee Stroemple	Forward	5–11	Sophomore	Canton, Ohio

== Schedule ==
Date time, TV	Rank^{#}	Opponent^{#}	Result	Record	Site (attendance) city, state
Regular season
11/13/2015*; 12:00 pm		at Texas Tech	L 45–79	0–1	United Supermarkets Arena (5,542); Lubbock, TX
11/17/2015*; 7:00 pm		Youngstown State	L 54–71	0–2	Gallagher Center (371); Lewiston, NY
11/21/2015*; 2:00 pm		Oakland	L 67–77	0–3	Gallagher Center (291); Lewiston, NY
11/27/2015*; 1:00 pm		Cleveland State	W 73–72	1–3	Gallagher Center (250); Lewiston, NY
11/29/2015*; 12:00 pm, ESPN3		at Detroit	L 75–80	1–4	Calihan Hall (177); Detroit, MI
12/04/2015*; 7:00 pm		at Manhattan	L 62–80	1–5 (0–1)	Draddy Gymnasium (248); Riverdale, NY
12/06/2015*; 2:00 pm, ESPN3		at Monmouth	L 60–83	1–6 (0–2)	Multipurpose Activity Center (526); West Long Branch, NJ
12/18/2015*; 7:00 pm		at Dartmouth	L 47–60	1–7	Leede Arena (516); Hanover, NH
12/21/2015; 7:00 pm, TWCSC		Buffalo	L 48–57	1–8	Gallagher Center (320); Lewiston, NY
12/23/2015*; 12:00 pm		at St. Bonaventure	L 55–67	1–9	Reilly Center (512); St. Bonaventure, NY
12/29/2015*; 2:00 pm		at Mount St. Mary's	L 79–80	2–9	Knott Arena (220); Emmitsburg, MD
01/02/2016; 7:00 pm, LCTV 20		Siena	L 51–59	2–10 (0–3)	Gallagher Center (267); Lewiston, NY
01/04/2016; 7:00 pm		Fairfield	W 56–55	3–10 (1–3)	Gallagher Center (251); Lewiston, NY
01/08/2016; 7:00 pm		at St. Peter's	W 52–48	4–10 (2–3)	Yanitelli Center (132); Jersey City, NJ
01/10/2016; 2:05 pm		at Rider	W 67–57	5–10 (3–3)	Alumni Gymnasium (506); Lawrenceville, NJ
01/15/2016; 11:00 am, LCTV 20		Quinnipiac	L 54–61	5–11 (3–4)	Gallagher Center (2,000); Lewiston, NY
01/17/2016; 2:00 pm, TWCS		St. Peter's	W 51–46	6–11 (4–4)	Gallagher Center (230); Lewiston, NY
01/21/2016; 7:00 pm		at Iona	L 46–73	6–12 (4–5)	Hynes Athletic Center (676); New Rochelle, NY
01/23/2016; 7:00 pm		at Marist	L 50–63	6–13 (4–6)	McCann Field House (1,475); Poughkeepsie, NY
01/28/2016; 7:00 pm, LCTV 20		Canisius; Battle of the Bridge	L 66–68 ^{OT}	6–14 (4–7)	Gallagher Center (484); Lewiston, NY
01/30/2016; 3:00 pm		Iona	L 52–73	6–15 (4–8)	Gallagher Center (310); Lewiston, NY
02/05/2016; 7:00 pm		at Fairfield	L 43–61	6–16 (4–9)	Alumni Hall (481); Bridgeport, CT
02/07/2016; 2:00 pm		at Quinnipiac	L 52–70	6–17 (4–10)	TD Bank Sports Center (686); Hamden, CT
02/12/2016; 7:00 pm		Marist	L 68–82	6–18 (4–11)	Gallagher Center (299); Lewiston, NY
02/14/2016; 2:00 pm		Rider	L 72–76	6–19 (4–12)	Gallagher Center (383); Lewiston, NY
02/19/2016; 7:00 pm		Monmouth	L 55–68	6–20 (4–13)	Gallagher Center (289); Lewiston, NY
02/21/2016; 2:00 pm		Manhattan	L 49–58	6–21 (4–14)	Gallagher Center (205); Lewiston, NY
02/25/2016; 5:00 pm, ESPN3		at Canisius; Battle of the Bridge	L 45–54	6–22 (4–15)	Koessler Athletic Center (2,023); Buffalo, NY
02/27/2016; 2:00 pm		at Siena	W 54–45	7–22 (5–15)	Alumni Recreation Center (570); Loudonville, NY
MAAC Tournament
03/03/2016; 9:30 am	(9)	vs. (8) Canisius; First round	W 65–64	8–22	Times Union Center; Albany, NY
03/04/2016; 12:00 pm	(9)	vs. (1) Quinnipiac; Quarterfinals	L 51–74	8–23	Times Union Center (2,844); Albany, NY
*Non-conference game. ^{#}Rankings from AP Poll. (#) Tournament seedings in parentheses. All times are in Eastern Time.
