= 2015–16 UMBC Retrievers women's basketball team =

Intercollegiate basketball season

2015–16 UMBC Retrievers women's basketball
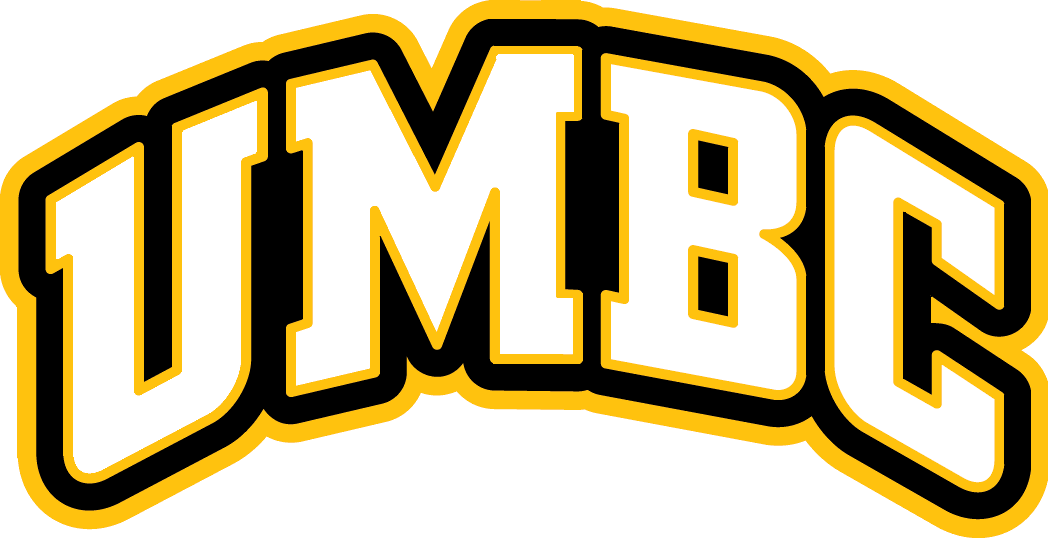

WBI, Quarterfinals
- Conference: America East Conference
- Record: 18–14 (8–8 America East)
- Head coach: Phil Stern (14th season)
- Assistant coaches: Rich Conover; Carlee Cassidy; Chelsea Barker
- Home arena: Retriever Activities Center

2015–16 America East Conference women's basketball standings
	Conf.				Overall
Team	W		L	PCT	W		L	PCT
Albany †	15	–	1	.938	28	–	5	.848
Maine	15	–	1	.938	26	–	9	.743
UMBC	8	–	8	.500	18	–	14	.563
Stony Brook	8	–	8	.500	17	–	15	.531
Binghamton	8	–	8	.500	14	–	17	.452
Hartford	7	–	9	.438	11	–	19	.367
New Hampshire	6	–	10	.375	12	–	18	.400
Vermont	4	–	12	.250	9	–	21	.300
UMass Lowell*	1	–	15	.063	4	–	24	.143
† 2016 America East tournament winner As of March 20, 2016 *ineligible for postseason play due to Div. I transitions Rankings from AP poll

The 2015–16 UMBC Retrievers women's basketball team represented the University of Maryland, Baltimore County in the America East Conference. The Retrievers were led by fourteenth-year head coach Phil Stern and played their home games in the Retriever Activities Center. They finished the season 18–14, 8–8 in America East play to finish in a three-way tie for fourth place. They lost in the quarterfinals of the America East women's tournament to Maine. They were invited to the Women's Basketball Invitational, where they defeated Fairfield in the first round before losing to Youngstown State in the quarterfinals.

== Media ==
All non-televised home games and conference road games were streamed on either ESPN3 or AmericaEast.tv. Most road games were streamed on the opponent's website. Select games were broadcast on the radio on WQLL-1370 AM.

== Roster ==
2015–16 UMBC Retrievers women's basketball team
Players
Coaches

Pos.	#	Name	Height	Year	Previous school	Hometown
G	0	Stixz Wilson	5 ft 6 in (1.68 m)	RS So	Seton Keough; Howard	Baltimore, MD
G	1	Meghan Roxas	5 ft 9 in (1.75 m)	RS Jr	Ridgewood; Temple	Ridgewood, NJ
G	2	Marissa Sommerville	5 ft 6 in (1.68 m)	Jr	St. Mary's Ryken	Loveville, MD
G/F	3	Liz McNaughton	6 ft 0 in (1.83 m)	Sr	Fairfax	Fairfax, VA
G	4	Taylor McCarley	5 ft 10 in (1.78 m)	Jr	Academy of the Holy Cross	Bowie, MD
F	10	Chukwuma Chiamaka	5 ft 11 in (1.8 m)	Jr	Eastern Arizona College	Lagos, Nigeria
G	12	Capree Garner	5 ft 7 in (1.7 m)	Sr	Springbrook; Harford CC	Silver Spring, MD
F	13	Pandora Wilson	6 ft 1 in (1.85 m)	RS Jr	Academy of the Holy Cross	Gaithersburg, MD
F/C	15	Amanda Hagaman	6 ft 2 in (1.88 m)	Jr	Manasquan	Manasquan, NJ
G	21	Carly Harris	5 ft 6 in (1.68 m)	So	Shaler Area	Glenshaw, PA
G	23	Emily Russo	5 ft 6 in (1.68 m)	Jr	Glenelg	Woodbine, MD
G	25	Laura Castaldo	5 ft 8 in (1.73 m)	So	Clarkstown South	West Nyack, NY
G/F	30	Gracie Doane	5 ft 11 in (1.8 m)	Fr	William Fleming	Roanoke, VA
G	31	Brittany Burgess (I) (redshirt)	6 ft 0 in (1.83 m)	Jr	St. Mary's Ryken; VCU	White Plains, MD
G	33	Michaela Gelbaugh	5 ft 8 in (1.73 m)	Fr	Central Dauphin East	Harrisburg, PA

Head coach

- Phil Stern (Concordia (NY))

Assistant coach(es)

- Kerry Cashman (Boston University)
- Carlee Cassidy-Dewey (UMBC)
- Chelsea Barker Walsh (UMBC)

Legend

- (C) Team captain
- (S) Suspended
- (I) Ineligible
- (W) Walk-on
- Injured
- Current redshirt

Roster

== Schedule ==
Date time, TV	Rank^{#}	Opponent^{#}	Result	Record	Site (attendance) city, state
Non-conference regular season
11/13/2015*; 12:00 pm		Columbia	L 68–70 ^{OT}	0–1	Retriever Activities Center (650); Catonsville, MD
11/15/2015*; 5:00 pm		Penn	L 46–81	0–2	Retriever Activities Center (514); Catonsville, MD
11/19/2015*; 12:00 pm		at Coppin State	W 68–61 ^{2OT}	1–2	Physical Education Complex (1,342); Baltimore, MD
11/21/2015*; 1:00 pm		Rider	W 58–53	2–2	Retriever Activities Center (416); Catonsville, MD
11/24/2015*; 11:00 am		at Towson	L 51–61	2–3	SECU Arena (2,333); Towson, MD
12/02/2015*; 7:00 pm		American	W 47–46	3–3	Retriever Activities Center (467); Catonsville, MD
12/06/2015*; 1:00 pm		La Salle	W 60–29	4–3	Retriever Activities Center (301); Catonsville, MD
12/08/2015*; 7:00 pm		Bucknell	W 65–52	5–3	Retriever Activities Center (612); Catonsville, MD
12/12/2015*; 2:00 pm		at Morgan State	W 65–46	6–3	Talmadge L. Hill Field House (459); Baltimore, MD
12/15/2015*; 6:00 pm		at Maryland Eastern Shore	W 55–52 ^{OT}	7–3	Hytche Athletic Center (428); Princess Anne, MD
12/20/2015*; 12:00 pm		at Loyola (MD)	W 52–46	8–3	Reitz Arena (258); Baltimore, MD
12/28/2015*; 1:00 pm		at Saint Joseph's; Hawk Classic semifinals	L 45–104	8–4	Hagan Arena (828); Philadelphia, PA
12/29/2015*; 1:00 pm		vs. Rider; Hawk Classic 3rd place game	W 67–58	9–4	Hagan Arena (743); Philadelphia, PA
America East regular season
01/02/2016; 1:00 pm		Vermont	W 85–48	10–4 (1–0)	Retriever Activities Center (331); Catonsville, MD
01/06/2016; 7:00 pm		Albany	L 42–77	10–5 (1–1)	Retriever Activities Center (317); Catonsville, MD
01/09/2016; 12:00 pm		at Maine	L 55–65	10–6 (1–2)	Cross Insurance Center (2,026); Bangor, ME
01/13/2016; 12:00 pm, ESPN3		Stony Brook	L 60–69 ^{OT}	10–7 (1–3)	Retriever Activities Center (2,004); Catonsville, MD
01/16/2016; 1:00 pm		at UMass Lowell	W 68–44	11–7 (2–3)	Costello Athletic Center (203); Lowell, MA
01/21/2016; 7:00 pm		at Hartford	L 57–65	11–8 (2–4)	Chase Arena at Reich Family Pavilion (1,012); Hartford, CT
01/27/2016; 7:00 pm		Binghamton	W 62–51	12–8 (3–4)	Retriever Activities Center (691); Catonsville, MD
01/30/2016; 1:00 pm		at New Hampshire	W 65–55	13–8 (4–4)	Lundholm Gym (491); Durham, NH
02/03/2016; 2:00 pm		at Albany	L 39–63	13–9 (4–5)	SEFCU Arena (1,704); Albany, NY
02/06/2016; 1:00 pm		Maine	L 38–72	13–10 (4–6)	Retriever Activities Center (608); Catonsville, MD
02/11/2016; 7:00 pm		at Stony Brook	W 69–65 ^{OT}	14–10 (5–6)	Island Federal Credit Union Arena (711); Stony Brook, NY
02/14/2016; 1:00 pm		UMass Lowell	W 68–52	15–10 (6–6)	Retriever Activities Center (503); Catonsville, MD
02/17/2016; 7:00 pm		Hartford	W 58–51	16–10 (7–6)	Retriever Activities Center (486); Catonsville, MD
02/20/2016; 1:00 pm		at Vermont	W 74–60	17–10 (8–6)	Patrick Gym (952); Burlington, VT
02/24/2016; 7:00 pm		at Binghamton	L 56–70	17–11 (8–7)	Binghamton University Events Center (1,142); Vestal, NY
02/28/2016; 1:00 pm		New Hampshire	L 59–67	17–12 (8–8)	Retriever Activities Center (691); Catonsville, MD
America East Women's Tournament
03/05/2016; 8:15 pm, ESPN3		vs. Binghamton; Quarterfinals	L 41–49	17–13	Binghamton University Events Center (2,080); Vestal, NY
WBI
03/17/2016; 7:00 pm		Fairfield; First Round	W 61–49	18–13	Retriever Activities Center (2,080); Catonsville, MD
03/19/2016; 2:00 pm		at Youngstown State; Quarterfinals	L 48–67	18–14	Beeghly Center (1,065); Youngstown, OH
*Non-conference game. ^{#}Rankings from AP Poll. (#) Tournament seedings in parentheses. All times are in Eastern Time.

== See also ==
- 2016–17 UMBC Retrievers women's basketball team
- 2015–16 UMBC Retrievers men's basketball team
