= 2015–16 UMass Lowell River Hawks women's basketball team =

Intercollegiate basketball season

2015–16 UMass Lowell River Hawks women's basketball
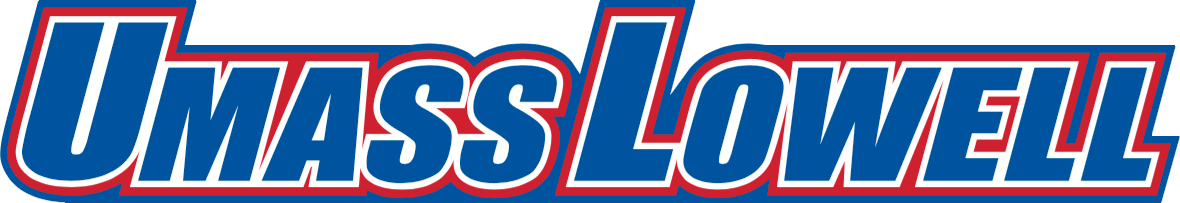
- Conference: America East Conference
- Record: 4–24 (1–15 America East)
- Head coach: Jenerrie Harris (2nd season)
- Assistant coaches: Kara Kelly; Emma Golen
- Home arena: Costello Athletic Center; Tsongas Center

2015–16 America East Conference women's basketball standings
	Conf.				Overall
Team	W		L	PCT	W		L	PCT
Albany †	15	–	1	.938	28	–	5	.848
Maine	15	–	1	.938	26	–	9	.743
UMBC	8	–	8	.500	18	–	14	.563
Stony Brook	8	–	8	.500	17	–	15	.531
Binghamton	8	–	8	.500	14	–	17	.452
Hartford	7	–	9	.438	11	–	19	.367
New Hampshire	6	–	10	.375	12	–	18	.400
Vermont	4	–	12	.250	9	–	21	.300
UMass Lowell*	1	–	15	.063	4	–	24	.143
† 2016 America East tournament winner As of March 20, 2016 *ineligible for postseason play due to Div. I transitions Rankings from AP poll

The 2015–16 UMass Lowell River Hawks women's basketball team represented the University of Massachusetts Lowell during the 2015–16 NCAA Division I women's basketball season. The River Hawks were led by second-year head coach Jenerrie Harris and played most of their home games at the Costello Athletic Center while select games were played at the Tsongas Center. They were members of the America East Conference. As part of their transition to Division I, they were ineligible for postseason play until the 2017–18 season. They finished the season 4–24, overall and 1–15 in America East play, placing last in the conference.

== Media ==
All non-televised home games and conference road games streamed on either ESPN3 or AmericaEast.tv. Most road games were streamed on the opponent's website.

== Roster ==
2015–16 UMass Lowell River Hawks women's basketball team
Players
Coaches

Pos.	#	Name	Height	Year	Previous school	Hometown
G	1	Kayla Gibbs	5 ft 11 in (1.8 m)	So	Teaneck	Teaneck, NJ
G	4	Brianna Rudolph	5 ft 9 in (1.75 m)	So	St. Mary's	Lynn, MA
G	12	Asia Mitchell-Owens	5 ft 8 in (1.73 m)	Jr	Oliver Ames	Roxbury, MA
G	22	Nazarae Butler	5 ft 8 in (1.73 m)	Fr	Columbus Africentric	Columbus, OH
G	24	Melissa Frase	5 ft 7 in (1.7 m)	Sr	Kennett	Tamworth, NH
F	31	Oda Shackelford	6 ft 2 in (1.88 m)	Fr	Southwestern	Edinburgh, IN
F	32	Lauren Parra	6 ft 1 in (1.85 m)	Jr	St. John the Baptist	Islip, NY
F	33	Lindsey Doucette	6 ft 2 in (1.88 m)	Sr	Hopkinton	Hopkinton, MA
G	34	Nicole Hayner	5 ft 9 in (1.75 m)	Jr	Bishop Guertin	Bedford, NH
F	50	Kathrine Smith	6 ft 2 in (1.88 m)	Fr	Canterbury	Fort Wayne, IN

Head coach

Jenerrie Harris (Kentucky)

Assistant coach(es)

Kara Kelly (Assumption (MA))
Emma Golen (Harvard)

Legend

- (C) Team captain
- (S) Suspended
- (I) Ineligible
- (W) Walk-on
- Injured
- Current redshirt

Roster
Last update: September 25, 2024

== Schedule ==
Date time, TV	Rank^{#}	Opponent^{#}	Result	Record	Site (attendance) city, state
Non-conference regular season
November 14, 2015*; 2:00 p.m.		at No. 9 Maryland	L 53–102	0–1	Xfinity Center (3,956); College Park, MD
November 17, 2015*; 7:00 p.m.		at Central Connecticut	L 53–64	0–2	William H. Detrick Gymnasium (971); New Britain, CT
November 20, 2015*; 7:00 p.m.		Columbia	L 57–67	0–3	Costello Athletic Center (378); Lowell, MA
November 24, 2015*; 6:00 p.m.		Bryant	L 64–83	0–4	Costello Athletic Center (346); Lowell, MA
November 28, 2015*; 2:00 p.m.		at Rhode Island	L 64–72	0–5	Ryan Center (393); Kingston, RI
December 1, 2015*; 7:00 p.m.		Boston University	W 70–57	1–5	Tsongas Center (515); Lowell, MA
December 4, 2015*; 5:00 p.m.		at FIU	L 68–71	1–6	FIU Arena (315); Miami, FL
December 6, 2015*; 1:00 p.m., ESPN3		at Miami (FL)	L 53–84	1–7	BankUnited Center (556); Coral Gables, FL
December 9, 2015*; 7:00 p.m.		Holy Cross	W 75–67	2–7	Costello Athletic Center (226); Lowell, MA
December 18, 2015*; 5:30 p.m.		at Fairleigh Dickinson	W 78–67	3–7	Rothman Center (216); Hackensack, NJ
December 20, 2015*; 1:00 p.m.		at Boston College	L 55–66	3–8	Conte Forum (537); Chestnut Hill, MA
December 30, 2015*; 7:00 p.m.		at Massachusetts	L 58–84	3–9	Mullins Center (526); Amherst, MA
America East regular Season
January 6, 2016; 7:00 p.m.		at Hartford	L 59–72	3–10 (0–1)	Chase Arena at Reich Family Pavilion (784); Hartford, CT
January 9, 2016; 7:00 p.m.		Stony Brook	L 50–54	3–11 (0–2)	Costello Athletic Center (241); Lowell, MA
January 13, 2016; 7:00 p.m.		at Maine	L 44–74	3–12 (0–3)	Cross Insurance Center (1,403); Bangor, ME
January 16, 2016; 1:00 p.m.		UMBC	L 44–68	3–13 (0–4)	Costello Athletic Center (203); Lowell, MA
January 18, 2016; 1:00 p.m.		Vermont	L 51–59	3–14 (0–5)	Costello Athletic Center (318); Lowell, MA
January 21, 2016; 7:00 p.m.		at New Hampshire	L 61–65	3–15 (0–6)	Lundholm Gym (261); Durham, NH
January 24, 2016; 11:00 a.m.		Binghamton	L 70–75 ^{OT}	3–16 (0–7)	Tsongas Center (1,272); Lowell, MA
January 27, 2016; 11:00 a.m.		Albany	L 55–85	3–17 (0–8)	Tsongas Center (3,363); Lowell, MA
February 3, 2016; 7:00 p.m.		Hartford	L 70–75 ^{OT}	3–18 (0–9)	Costello Athletic Center (449); Lowell, MA
February 6, 2016; 2:00 p.m.		at Stony Brook	L 46–60	3–19 (0–10)	Island Federal Credit Union Arena (851); Stony Brook, NY
February 8, 2016; 7:00 p.m.		at Vermont	W 68–66	4–19 (1–10)	Patrick Gym (376); Burlington, VT
February 11, 2016; 7:00 p.m.		Maine	L 46–73	4–20 (1–11)	Costello Athletic Center (321); Lowell, MA
February 14, 2016; 1:00 p.m.		at UMBC	L 52–68	4–21 (1–12)	Retriever Activities Center (503); Catonsville, MD
February 17, 2016; 7:00 p.m.		New Hampshire	L 55–63	4–22 (1–13)	Tsongas Center (1,992); Lowell, MA
February 20, 2016; 2:00 p.m.		at Binghamton	L 52–55	4–23 (1–14)	Binghamton University Events Center (2,284); Vestal, NY
February 25, 2016; 7:00 p.m.		at Albany	L 57–88	4–24 (1–15)	SEFCU Arena (1,197); Albany, NY
*Non-conference game. ^{#}Rankings from AP Poll. (#) Tournament seedings in parentheses. All times are in Eastern Time.

== See also ==
- 2015–16 UMass Lowell River Hawks men's basketball team
