= 2015–16 Rhode Island Rams women's basketball team =

Intercollegiate basketball season

2015–16 Rhode Island Rams women's basketball
- Conference: Atlantic 10 Conference
- Record: 12–18 (5–11 A-10)
- Head coach: Daynia La-Force (2nd season)
- Assistant coaches: Tom Blake; Danielle Parks; Marcus Reilly
- Home arena: Ryan Center

2015–16 Atlantic 10 women's basketball standings
	Conf.				Overall
Team	W		L	PCT	W		L	PCT
Duquesne	13	–	3	.813	28	–	6	.824
George Washington †	13	–	3	.813	26	–	7	.788
Saint Louis	13	–	3	.813	26	–	8	.765
St. Bonaventure	12	–	4	.750	24	–	8	.750
VCU	10	–	6	.625	23	–	10	.697
Saint Joseph's	8	–	8	.500	14	–	15	.483
Fordham	8	–	8	.500	14	–	17	.452
Dayton	7	–	9	.438	14	–	15	.483
George Mason	6	–	10	.375	12	–	19	.387
Richmond	5	–	11	.313	13	–	18	.419
Rhode Island	5	–	11	.313	12	–	18	.400
UMass	5	–	11	.313	12	–	18	.400
Davidson	5	–	11	.313	11	–	19	.367
La Salle	2	–	14	.125	5	–	25	.167
† 2016 A10 Tournament winner As of March 25, 2016; Rankings from AP poll

The 2015–16 Rhode Island Rams women's basketball team represented the University of Rhode Island during the 2015–16 college basketball season. The Rams, led by second year head coach Daynia La-Force, were members of the Atlantic 10 Conference and played their home games at the Ryan Center. They finished the season 12–18, 5–11 in A-10 to finish a 4 way tie for tenth place. They advanced to the quarterfinals of the A-10 women's tournament, where they lost to Saint Louis.

== 2015–16 media ==
All Rams home games and most conference road games that aren't televised will be shown on the A-10 Digital Network.

== Roster ==
2015–16 Rhode Island Rams women's basketball team
Players
Coaches

Pos.	#	Name	Height	Year	Previous school	Hometown
G	1	Tayra Meléndez	5 ft 11 in (1.8 m)	Sr	The Rivers School	Mattapan, MA
F	2	Ross Jalissa	6 ft 2 in (1.88 m)	Fr	Fenway	Roxbury, MA
G	3	Charise Wilson	5 ft 5 in (1.65 m)	So	St. Anthony's	West Babylon, NY
G	12	Morgan Johnson	5 ft 10 in (1.78 m)	RS So	Keystone	Knox, PA
G	13	Kallie Banker	5 ft 10 in (1.78 m)	RS Jr	Grand Island	Grand Island, NY
F	15	Kiara Palmer	6 ft 0 in (1.83 m)	So	Our Lady of Lourdes	Miami, FL
G	20	Dominique Ward	5 ft 11 in (1.8 m)	Fr	Rancocas Valley	Trenton, NJ
G	21	Symone Bullard	5 ft 7 in (1.7 m)	Sr	American heritage Plantation	Pompano Beach, FL
G	22	Dempsey Cooper	5 ft 9 in (1.75 m)	Jr	Germantown Academy	Doylestown, PA
G	23	Brianna Thomas	5 ft 9 in (1.75 m)	Sr	Gettysburg Area	Gettuysburg, PA
F	30	Tyler Raysor	6 ft 3 in (1.91 m)	So	Haddon Heights	Lawnside, NJ
G	31	Anari Johnson	6 ft 1 in (1.85 m)	Fr	Dallastown Area	Red Lion, PA
F	34	Samantha Tabakman	6 ft 3 in (1.91 m)	Jr	Pequannock Township	Pompton Plains, NJ
C	43	Dina Motrechuk	6 ft 5 in (1.96 m)	Fr	Moore Catholic	Staten Island, NY

Head coach

- Daynia La-Force (Georgetown)

Assistant coach(es)

- Tom Blake (Connecticut)
- Danielle Parks (Adelphi)
- Marcus Reilly (Trinity)

Legend

- (C) Team captain
- (S) Suspended
- (I) Ineligible
- (W) Walk-on
- Injured
- Current redshirt

Roster

== Schedule ==
Date time, TV	Rank^{#}	Opponent^{#}	Result	Record	Site (attendance) city, state
Non-conference regular season
11/13/2015*; 5:00 pm		No. 23 Syracuse	L 54–57	0–1	Ryan Center (1,196); Kingston, RI
11/18/2015*; 6:00 pm		at Marshall	L 62–72	0–2	Cam Henderson Center (631); Huntington, WV
11/21/2015*; 12:00 pm		Harvard; URI Tournament	W 56–52	1–2	Ryan Center (417); Kingston, RI
11/22/2015*; 12:00 pm		Albany; URI Tournament	L 58–67	1–3	Ryan Center (425); Kingston, RI
11/28/2015*; 2:00 pm		UMass Lowell	W 72–64	2–3	Ryan Center (393); Kingston, RI
12/01/2015*; 7:00 pm		at Brown; Ocean State Cup	L 63–67	2–4	Pizzitola Sports Center (246); Providence, RI
12/04/2015*; 7:00 pm		at Dartmouth	W 57–41	3–4	Leede Arena (565); Hanover, NH
12/09/2015*; 7:00 pm		at Boston University	W 57–41	4–4	Case Gym (218); Boston, MA
12/12/2015*; 2:00 pm		Columbia	W 57–56	5–4	Ryan Center (386); Kingston, RI
12/20/2015*; 2:00 pm		Providence; Ocean State Cup	L 55–64 ^{OT}	5–5	Ryan Center (490); Kingston, RI
12/28/2015*; 12:00 pm		at FIU; The Surfing Santa Classic semifinals	W 68–50	6–5	FIU Arena; Miami, FL
12/29/2015*; 12:00 pm		vs. Hampton; The Surfing Santa Classic championship	L 54–59 ^{OT}	6–6	FIU Arena; Miami, FL
Atlantic 10 regular season
01/03/2016; 2:00 pm		St. Bonaventure	L 56–69	6–7 (0–1)	Ryan Center (452); Kingston, RI
01/06/2016; 12:00 pm, NBCSN		at George Washington	L 58–68	6–8 (0–2)	Charles E. Smith Center (1,989); Washington, D.C.
01/09/2016; 2:00 pm		at Richmond	W 57–50	7–8 (1–2)	Robins Center (994); Richmond, VA
01/13/2016; 7:00 pm		Duquesne	L 70–79	7–9 (1–3)	Ryan Center (334); Kingston, RI
01/16/2016; 1:00 pm		at La Salle	W 72–61	8–9 (2–3)	Tom Gola Arena (357); Philadelphia, PA
01/23/2016; 1:00 pm		Davidson	W 78–62	9–9 (3–3)	Ryan Center (677); Kingston, RI
01/27/2016; 12:00 pm		at Massachusetts	W 80–79	10–9 (4–3)	Mullins Center (1,281); Amherst, MA
01/30/2016; 2:00 pm		at Fordham	L 42–50	10–10 (4–4)	Rose Hill Gymnasium (494); Bronx, NY
02/03/2016; 7:00 pm		La Salle	W 62–52	11–10 (5–4)	Ryan Center (433); Kingston, RI
02/07/2016; 2:00 pm		Dayton	L 53–67	11–11 (5–5)	Ryan Center (417); Kingston, RI
02/10/2016; 7:00 pm		at Duquesne	L 56–61	11–12 (5–6)	Palumbo Center (498); Pittsburgh, PA
02/13/2016; 2:00 pm		George Mason	L 65–68	11–13 (5–7)	Ryan Center (450); Kingston, RI
02/17/2016; 7:00 pm		VCU	L 36–49	11–14 (5–8)	Ryan Center (540); Kingston, RI
02/20/2016; 2:00 pm		at Saint Joseph's	L 63–74	11–15 (5–9)	Hagan Arena (1,267); Philadelphia, PA
02/24/2016; 7:00 pm		Massachusetts	L 64–71	11–16 (5–10)	Ryan Center (494); Kingston, RI
02/27/2016; 3:00 pm		at Saint Louis	L 60–77	11–17 (5–11)	Chaifetz Arena (3,038); St. Louis, MO
Atlantic 10 Women's Tournament
03/03/2016; 4:30 pm		vs. Saint Joseph's; Second Round	W 81–76	12–17	Richmond Coliseum; Richmond, VA
03/03/2016; 4:30 pm, ASN		vs. Saint Louis; Quarterfinals	L 59–70	12–18	Richmond Coliseum; Richmond, VA
*Non-conference game. ^{#}Rankings from AP Poll. (#) Tournament seedings in parentheses. All times are in Eastern Time.

== Rankings ==
2015–16 NCAA Division I women's basketball rankings

+ Regular season polls	Poll	Pre- Season	Week 2	Week 3	Week 4	Week 5	Week 6	Week 7	Week 8	Week 9	Week 10	Week 11	Week 12	Week 13	Week 14	Week 15	Week 16	Week 17	Week 18	Final
AP																				
Coaches																				

Legend
	Increase in ranking
	Decrease in ranking
	No change
(RV)	Received votes
(NR)	Not ranked

== See also ==
- 2015–16 Rhode Island Rams men's basketball team
