= 2015–16 St. Bonaventure Bonnies women's basketball team =

Intercollegiate basketball season

2015–16 St. Bonaventure Bonnies women's basketball

NCAA Women's Tournament, second round
- Conference: Atlantic 10 Conference
- Record: 24–8 (12–4 A-10)
- Head coach: Jim Crowley (16th season)
- Assistant coaches: Andrea Mulcahy; Tiara Johnson; Jessica Jenkins
- Home arena: Reilly Center

2015–16 Atlantic 10 women's basketball standings
| | Conf. | | | | Overall |
| Team | W | | L | PCT | W | | L | PCT |
|---|---|---|---|---|---|---|---|---|
| Duquesne | 13 | – | 3 | .813 | 28 | – | 6 | .824 |
| George Washington † | 13 | – | 3 | .813 | 26 | – | 7 | .788 |
| Saint Louis | 13 | – | 3 | .813 | 26 | – | 8 | .765 |
| St. Bonaventure | 12 | – | 4 | .750 | 24 | – | 8 | .750 |
| VCU | 10 | – | 6 | .625 | 23 | – | 10 | .697 |
| Saint Joseph's | 8 | – | 8 | .500 | 14 | – | 15 | .483 |
| Fordham | 8 | – | 8 | .500 | 14 | – | 17 | .452 |
| Dayton | 7 | – | 9 | .438 | 14 | – | 15 | .483 |
| George Mason | 6 | – | 10 | .375 | 12 | – | 19 | .387 |
| Richmond | 5 | – | 11 | .313 | 13 | – | 18 | .419 |
| Rhode Island | 5 | – | 11 | .313 | 12 | – | 18 | .400 |
| UMass | 5 | – | 11 | .313 | 12 | – | 18 | .400 |
| Davidson | 5 | – | 11 | .313 | 11 | – | 19 | .367 |
| La Salle | 2 | – | 14 | .125 | 5 | – | 25 | .167 |
† 2016 A10 Tournament winner As of March 25, 2016; Rankings from AP poll

The 2015–16 St. Bonaventure Bonnies women's basketball team represented the St. Bonaventure University during the 2015–16 college basketball season. The Bonnies were coached by head coach Jim Crowley, in his sixteenth and final year in that position; he left to take over the Providence Friars women's basketball team on May 10, 2016. The Bonnies were members of the Atlantic 10 Conference and played their home games at the Reilly Center. They finished the season 24–8, 12–4 in A-10 play to finish in fourth place. They lost in the quarterfinals of the Atlantic 10 women's tournament to VCU. They received an at-large bid to the NCAA women's tournament, where they defeated Oklahoma State in the first round before falling to Oregon State in the second round.

Crowley finished his tenure at St. Bonaventure with a record of 258–231.

== 2015–16 media ==
All non-televised Bonnies home games aired on the A-10 Digital Network. On radio, WGWE continued to broadcast games.

== Roster ==
2015–16 St. Bonaventure Bonnies women's basketball team
Players
Coaches

| Pos. | # | Name | Height | Year | Previous school | Hometown |
|---|---|---|---|---|---|---|
| G | 1 | Keely Fresh | 5 ft 8 in (1.73 m) | Fr | Rockbridge County | Lexington, VA |
| G | 2 | Mariah Ruff | 5 ft 9 in (1.75 m) | So | Oneonta | Oneonta, NY |
| G | 4 | Kelcie Rombach | 5 ft 11 in (1.8 m) | Sr | Ottawa Township | Ottawa, IL |
| G | 10 | McKenna Maycock | 5 ft 9 in (1.75 m) | Fr | Randolph | Randolph, NY |
| F | 14 | Gabrielle Richmond | 6 ft 1 in (1.85 m) | RS Jr | Morgan Park | Chicago, IL |
| G | 21 | Nyla Rueter | 5 ft 9 in (1.75 m) | Sr | Hagerstown | Hagerstown, IN |
| G | 22 | Imani Outlaw | 5 ft 8 in (1.73 m) | Jr | Sycamore | Cincinnati, OH |
| F | 23 | Matea Britvar | 6 ft 1 in (1.85 m) | So | Dr. Phillips | Orlando, FL |
| F | 32 | Miranda Drummond | 6 ft 1 in (1.85 m) | Fr | Harpursville | Binghamton, NY |
| G | 33 | Emily Michael | 5 ft 8 in (1.73 m) | Sr | Chaminade Julienne | Clayton, OH |
| F | 40 | Erin Wood | 6 ft 2 in (1.88 m) | Fr | Noblesville | Noblesville, IN |
| F | 42 | Katie Healy | 6 ft 1 in (1.85 m) | Sr | Lancaster | Lancaster, NY |

Head coach

- Jim Crowley (Keuka)

Assistant coach(es)

- Andrea Mulcahy (St. Bonaventure)
- Tiara Johnson (St. Bonaventure)
- Jessica Jenkins (St. Bonaventure)

Legend

- (C) Team captain
- (S) Suspended
- (I) Ineligible
- (W) Walk-on
- Injured
- Current redshirt

Roster

== Schedule ==
| Date time, TV | Rank^{#} | Opponent^{#} | Result | Record | Site (attendance) city, state |
Exhibition
| 11/07/2015*; 1:30 pm | | Edinboro | W 79–37 | | Reilly Center (2,870); Olean, NY |
Non-conference regular season
| 11/13/2015*; 5:30 pm | | Siena; Preseason WNIT First Round | W 57–40 | 1–0 | Reilly Center (1,090); Olean, NY |
| 11/15/2015*; 5:00 pm | | at DePaul; Preseason WNIT Second Round | L 54–77 | 1–1 | McGrath-Phillips Arena (2,308); Chicago, IL |
| 11/21/2015*; 5:00 pm | | at Drexel; Preseason WNIT Consolation round | L 46–58 | 1–2 | Daskalakis Athletic Center (1,479); Philadelphia, PA |
| 11/24/2015*; 5:00 pm | | Detroit | W 84–73 | 2–2 | Reilly Center (374); Olean, NY |
| 11/29/2015*; 1:00 pm | | Toledo | W 74–63 | 3–2 | Reilly Center (378); Olean, NY |
| 12/01/2015*; 7:00 pm | | at Stony Brook | W 73–68 ^{2OT} | 4–2 | Island Federal Credit Union Arena (433); Stony Brook, NY |
| 12/05/2015*; 1:30 pm | | Georgetown | W 69–54 | 5–2 | Reilly Center (485); Olean, NY |
| 12/07/2015*; 7:00 pm | | James Madison | W 56–45 | 6–2 | Reilly Center (518); Olean, NY |
| 12/09/2015*; 7:00 pm | | Buffalo | W 59–32 | 7–2 | Reilly Center (498); Olean, NY |
| 12/12/2015*; 1:30 pm | | Penn State | W 70–60 | 8–2 | Reilly Center (884); Olean, NY |
| 12/19/2015*; 4:00 pm | | at Colgate | W 62–38 | 9–2 | Cotterell Court (583); Hamilton, NY |
| 12/23/2015*; 12:00 pm | | Niagara | W 67–55 | 10–2 | Reilly Center (512); Olean, NY |
| 12/29/2015*; 7:00 pm | | at Canisius | W 59–47 | 11–2 | Koessler Athletic Center (801); Buffalo, NY |
Atlantic 10 regular season
| 01/03/2016; 2:00 pm | | at Rhode Island | W 69–56 | 12–2 (1–0) | Ryan Center (452); Kingston, RI |
| 01/07/2016; 7:00 pm | | Fordham | W 55–41 | 13–2 (2–0) | Reilly Center (1,344); Olean, NY |
| 01/10/2016; 5:00 pm, ASN | | Massachusetts | W 66–41 | 14–2 (3–0) | Reilly Center (1,057); Olean, NY |
| 01/13/2016; 7:00 pm | | at Davidson | W 59–47 | 15–2 (4–0) | John M. Belk Arena (387); Davidson, NC |
| 01/16/2016; 1:00 pm | | George Mason | W 70–55 | 16–2 (5–0) | Reilly Center (1,221); Olean, NY |
| 01/20/2016; 7:00 pm | | at Dayton | W 59–54 | 17–2 (6–0) | UD Arena (2,514); Dayton, OH |
| 01/23/2016; 7:00 pm | | at Duquesne | L 62–74 | 17–3 (6–1) | Palumbo Center (652); Pittsburgh, PA |
| 01/27/2016; 7:00 pm | | Saint Joseph's | W 65–51 | 18–3 (7–1) | Reilly Center (955); Olean, NY |
| 01/31/2016; 12:30 pm, ASN | | Richmond | W 66–43 | 19–3 (8–1) | Reilly Center (2,011); Olean, NY |
| 02/03/2016; 7:00 pm | | at VCU | L 47–52 | 19–4 (8–2) | Siegel Center; Richmond, VA |
| 02/10/2016; 7:00 pm | | Saint Louis | W 80–59 | 20–4 (9–2) | Reilly Center (987); Olean, NY |
| 02/13/2016; 2:00 pm | | at Massachusetts | L 60–69 | 20–5 (9–3) | Mullins Center (374); Amherst, MA |
| 02/17/2016; 7:00 pm | | George Washington | W 69–67 ^{OT} | 21–5 (10–3) | Reilly Center (897); Olean, NY |
| 02/20/2016; 1:00 pm | | at La Salle | W 70–63 | 22–5 (11–3) | Tom Gola Arena (536); Philadelphia, PA |
| 02/24/2016; 7:00 pm | | at Fordham | L 68–77 | 22–6 (11–4) | Rose Hill Gymnasium (785); Bronx, NY |
| 02/28/2016; 1:00 pm | | Duquesne | W 60–48 | 23–6 (12–4) | Reilly Center (1,370); Olean, NY |
Atlantic 10 Tournament
| 03/04/2016; 2:00 pm, ASN | | vs. VCU; Quarterfinals | L 50–59 | 23–7 | Richmond Coliseum; Richmond, VA |
NCAA Women's Tournament
| 03/18/2016*; 7:30 pm, ESPN2 | (10 D) | vs. (7 D) Oklahoma State; First Round | W 65–54 | 24–7 | Gill Coliseum (4,702); Corvallis, OR |
| 03/20/2016*; 9:00 pm, ESPN2 | (10 D) | at (2 D) No. 6 Oregon State; Second Round | L 40–69 | 24–8 | Gill Coliseum (6,074); Corvallis, OR |
*Non-conference game. ^{#}Rankings from AP Poll. (#) Tournament seedings in parentheses. D=Dallas Region. All times are in Eastern Time.

== Rankings ==
Regular season polls
| Poll | Pre- season | Week 2 | Week 3 | Week 4 | Week 5 | Week 6 | Week 7 | Week 8 | Week 9 | Week 10 | Week 11 | Week 12 | Week 13 | Week 14 | Week 15 | Week 16 | Week 17 | Week 18 | Week 19 | Final |
|---|---|---|---|---|---|---|---|---|---|---|---|---|---|---|---|---|---|---|---|---|
| AP | NR | NR | NR | NR | NR | NR | NR | NR | NR | NR | RV | NR | NR | NR | NR | NR | NR | NR | NR | N/A |
| Coaches | NR | NR | NR | NR | NR | NR | NR | NR | NR | NR | NR | NR | NR | NR | NR | NR | NR | NR | NR | NR |

Legend
| | Increase in ranking |
| | Decrease in ranking |
| | No change |
| (RV) | Received votes |
| (NR) | Not ranked |

== See also ==
- 2015–16 St. Bonaventure Bonnies men's basketball team
