= 2015–16 Saint Louis Billikens women's basketball team =

Intercollegiate basketball season

2015–16 Saint Louis Billikens women's basketball
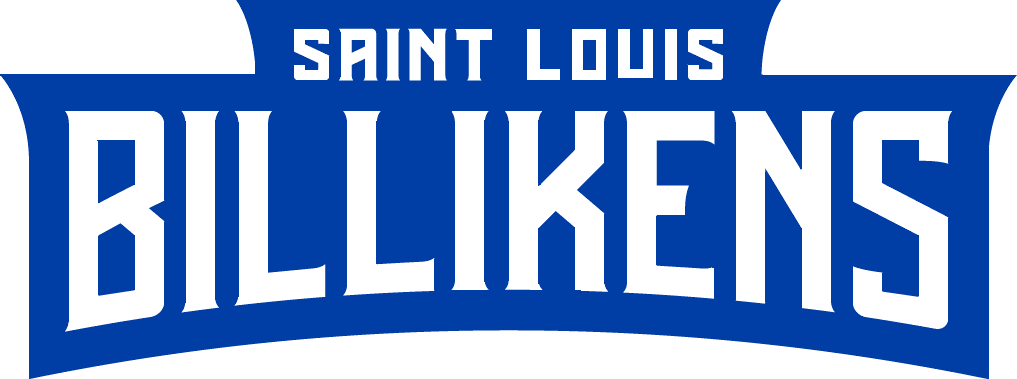

A-10 Regular Season Co-Champions

WNIT, Third Round
- Conference: Atlantic 10 Conference
- Record: 26–8 (13–3 A-10)
- Head coach: Lisa Stone (4th season)
- Assistant coaches: Mike Geary; Glenn Box; Jordann Plummer
- Home arena: Chaifetz Arena

2015–16 Atlantic 10 women's basketball standings
	Conf.				Overall
Team	W		L	PCT	W		L	PCT
Duquesne	13	–	3	.813	28	–	6	.824
George Washington †	13	–	3	.813	26	–	7	.788
Saint Louis	13	–	3	.813	26	–	8	.765
St. Bonaventure	12	–	4	.750	24	–	8	.750
VCU	10	–	6	.625	23	–	10	.697
Saint Joseph's	8	–	8	.500	14	–	15	.483
Fordham	8	–	8	.500	14	–	17	.452
Dayton	7	–	9	.438	14	–	15	.483
George Mason	6	–	10	.375	12	–	19	.387
Richmond	5	–	11	.313	13	–	18	.419
Rhode Island	5	–	11	.313	12	–	18	.400
UMass	5	–	11	.313	12	–	18	.400
Davidson	5	–	11	.313	11	–	19	.367
La Salle	2	–	14	.125	5	–	25	.167
† 2016 A10 Tournament winner As of March 25, 2016; Rankings from AP poll

The 2015–16 Saint Louis Billikens women's basketball team represented the Saint Louis University during the 2015–16 college basketball season. The Billikens, led by fourth year head coach Lisa Stone, were members of the Atlantic 10 Conference and played their home games at the Chaifetz Arena. They finished the season 26–8, 13–3 in A-10 play to share the A-10 regular season title with Duquesne and George Washington. They advanced to the semifinals of the A-10 women's tournament, where they lost to Duquesne. They were invited to the Women's National Invitation Tournament, where they defeated Arkansas–Little Rock and Ball State in the first and second round before losing to WKU in the third round.

== 2015–16 media ==
All non-televised Billikens home games and conference road games will stream on the A-10 Digital Network.

== Roster ==
2015–16 Saint Louis Billikens women's basketball team
Players
Coaches

Pos.	#	Name	Height	Year	Previous school	Hometown
G	3	Jackie Kemph	5 ft 7 in (1.7 m)	So	Rolling Meadows	Arlington Heights, IL
G	4	Kerri McMahan (I) (redshirt)	5 ft 10 in (1.78 m)	So	Novi; Akron	Novi, MI
G	5	Aaliyah Covington	5 ft 11 in (1.8 m)	So	Edwardsville	Edwardsville, IL
F	10	Jenny Vliet	6 ft 2 in (1.88 m)	So	Rolling Meadows	Arlington Heights, IL
G	11	Jamesia Price	5 ft 7 in (1.7 m)	RS Sr	Blue Springs	Blue Springs, MO
F	12	Olivia Jakubicek	5 ft 10 in (1.78 m)	Jr	Cary-Grove	Cary, IL
G	15	Paige Rakers (I) (redshirt)	5 ft 11 in (1.8 m)	Jr	Carlyle; Michigan	Carlyle, IL
G	20	Jordyn Frantz	6 ft 0 in (1.83 m)	Fr	NorthWood	Wakarusa, IN
G	24	Jasmin Samz	5 ft 10 in (1.78 m)	Fr	Wausaw West	Wausau, WI
F	33	Erin Nelson	5 ft 10 in (1.78 m)	Jr	St. Joseph's	Ballwin, MO
F	34	Denisha Womack	6 ft 1 in (1.85 m)	Sr	Peoria Central	Peoria, IL
C	40	Sadie Stipanovich	6 ft 3 in (1.91 m)	Jr	Westminster Christian Academy	St. Louis, MO
F	42	Maddison Gits	6 ft 4 in (1.93 m)	So	Oregon	Fitchburg, WI
C	45	Tara Dusharm	6 ft 5 in (1.96 m)	Fr	Foley	Foley, MN
F	55	Shea Shipman	6 ft 0 in (1.83 m)	So	Olathe Northwest	Olathe, KS

Head coach

- Lisa Stone (Iowa)

Assistant coach(es)

- Mike Geary (Aquinas (MI))
- Glenn Box (Southeast Missouri State)
- Jordann Plummer (Drake)

Legend

- (C) Team captain
- (S) Suspended
- (I) Ineligible
- (W) Walk-on
- Injured
- Current redshirt

Roster

== Schedule ==
Date time, TV	Rank^{#}	Opponent^{#}	Result	Record	Site (attendance) city, state
Exhibition
11/07/2015*; 7:00 pm		Harris–Stowe	W 107–31		Chaifetz Arena; St. Louis, MO
Non-conference regular season
11/14/2015*; 3:00 pm		Southeast Missouri State	W 67–52	1–0	Chaifetz Arena (704); St. Louis, MO
11/17/2015*; 7:00 pm		Tulsa	W 82–73	2–0	Chaifetz Arena (225); St. Louis, MO
11/22/2015*; 1:00 pm, ESPN3		at Mercer	W 68–60	3–0	Hawkins Arena (427); Macon, GA
11/25/2015*; 5:00 pm, ESPN3		at Indiana State	W 62–52	4–0	Hulman Center (1,493); Terre Haute, IN
11/28/2015*; 3:00 pm		Eastern Illinois	W 78–47	5–0	Chaifetz Arena (388); St. Louis, MO
11/30/2015*; 3:00 pm		Missouri–St. Louis	W 67–31	6–0	Chaifetz Arena (228); St. Louis, MO
12/02/2015*; 7:00 pm		at Memphis	W 63–57	7–0	Elma Roane Fieldhouse (588); Memphis, TN
12/07/2015*; 7:00 pm		at SIU Edwardsville	L 64–71	7–1	Vadalabene Center (858); Edwardsville, IL
12/18/2015*; 7:00 pm		at Alabama A&M	W 91–60	8–1	Elmore Gymnasium (110); Huntsville, AL
12/20/2015*; 3:00 pm		vs. Cleveland State; Tulane Classic semifinals	W 76–65	9–1	Devlin Fieldhouse (113); New Orleans, LA
12/21/2015*; 5:00 pm		at Tulane; Tulane Classic championship	L 58–66	9–2	Devlin Fieldhouse (723); New Orleans, LA
12/28/2015*; 6:00 pm, ESPN3		at Ball State	L 70–79	9–3	John E. Worthen Arena (958); Muncie, IN
12/30/2015*; 7:00 pm		Bradley	W 75–58	10–3	Chaifetz Arena (1,513); St. Louis, MO
Atlantic 10 regular season
01/02/2015; 1:00 pm		George Mason	L 63–73 ^{OT}	10–4 (0–1)	Chaifetz Arena (1,007); St. Louis, MO
01/07/2015; 6:00 pm		at VCU	W 77–72	11–4 (1–1)	Siegel Center (382); Richmond, VA
01/10/2015; 1:00 pm		at Davidson	W 79–50	12–4 (2–1)	John M. Belk Arena (389); Davidson, NC
01/13/2015; 7:00 pm		Massachusetts	W 69–49	13–4 (3–1)	Chaifetz Arena (203); St. Louis, MO
01/16/2015; 7:00 pm		Dayton	W 70–56	14–4 (4–1)	Chaifetz Arena (9,985); St. Louis, MO
01/20/2015; 6:00 pm		at Saint Joseph's	W 77–66	15–4 (5–1)	Hagan Arena (337); Philadelphia, PA
01/23/2015; 7:00 pm		La Salle	W 79–70	16–4 (6–1)	Chaifetz Arena (750); St. Louis, MO
01/28/2015; 6:00 pm		at George Mason	W 61–50	17–4 (7–1)	EagleBank Arena (502); Fairfax, VA
01/31/2015; 1:00 pm		at George Washington	L 80–89	17–5 (7–2)	Charles E. Smith Center (781); Washington, D.C.
02/03/2015; 11:00 am		Richmond	W 73–48	18–5 (8–2)	Chaifetz Arena (4,011); St. Louis, MO
02/10/2015; 6:00 pm		at St. Bonaventure	L 59–80	18–6 (8–3)	Reilly Center (987); Olean, NY
02/15/2015; 11:00 am, NBCSN		Davidson	W 88–51	19–6 (9–3)	Chaifetz Arena (2,084); St. Louis, MO
02/18/2015; 7:00 pm		Duquesne	W 84–81	20–6 (10–3)	Chaifetz Arena (837); St. Louis, MO
02/21/2015; 1:00 pm		at Fordham	W 51–49	21–6 (11–3)	Rose Hill Gymnasium (522); Bronx, NY
02/24/2015; 6:00 pm		at Dayton	W 55–52	22–6 (12–3)	UD Arena (1,689); Dayton, OH
02/27/2015; 2:00 pm		Rhode Island	W 77–60	23–6 (13–3)	Chaifetz Arena (3,038); St. Louis, MO
Atlantic 10 Tournament
03/04/2016; 3:30 pm, ASN		vs. Rhode Island; Quarterfinals	W 70–59	24–6	Richmond Coliseum; Richmond, VA
03/05/2016; 12:30 pm, CBSSN		vs. Duquesne; Semifinals	L 52–56	24–7	Richmond Coliseum (1,335); Richmond, VA
WNIT
03/17/2016*; 7:00 pm		Arkansas–Little Rock; First Round	W 70–69	25–7	Chaifetz Arena (1,051); St. Louis, MO
03/21/2016*; 7:00 pm		Ball State; Second Round	W 59–57	26–7	Chaifetz Arena (1,430); St. Louis, MO
03/25/2016*; 7:00 pm		WKU; Third Round	L 76–78 ^{OT}	26–8	Chaifetz Arena (1,754); St. Louis, MO
*Non-conference game. ^{#}Rankings from AP Poll. (#) Tournament seedings in parentheses. All times are in Central Time.

== Rankings ==
2015–16 NCAA Division I women's basketball rankings

+ Regular season polls	Poll	Pre- Season	Week 2	Week 3	Week 4	Week 5	Week 6	Week 7	Week 8	Week 9	Week 10	Week 11	Week 12	Week 13	Week 14	Week 15	Week 16	Week 17	Week 18	Final
AP																				
Coaches																				

Legend
	Increase in ranking
	Decrease in ranking
	No change
(RV)	Received votes
(NR)	Not ranked

== See also ==
- 2015–16 Saint Louis Billikens men's basketball team
