= 2015–16 Duquesne Dukes women's basketball team =

Intercollegiate basketball season

2015–16 Duquesne Dukes women's basketball

UNM Thanksgiving Tournament Champions A-10 Regular Season Co-Champions

NCAA Women's Tournament, second round
- Conference: Atlantic 10 Conference
- Record: 28–6 (13–3 A-10)
- Head coach: Dan Burt (3rd season)
- Assistant coaches: Eddie Benton; Matt Schmidt; Rachel Wojdowski
- Home arena: Palumbo Center

2015–16 Atlantic 10 women's basketball standings
	Conf.				Overall
Team	W		L	PCT	W		L	PCT
Duquesne	13	–	3	.813	28	–	6	.824
George Washington †	13	–	3	.813	26	–	7	.788
Saint Louis	13	–	3	.813	26	–	8	.765
St. Bonaventure	12	–	4	.750	24	–	8	.750
VCU	10	–	6	.625	23	–	10	.697
Saint Joseph's	8	–	8	.500	14	–	15	.483
Fordham	8	–	8	.500	14	–	17	.452
Dayton	7	–	9	.438	14	–	15	.483
George Mason	6	–	10	.375	12	–	19	.387
Richmond	5	–	11	.313	13	–	18	.419
Rhode Island	5	–	11	.313	12	–	18	.400
UMass	5	–	11	.313	12	–	18	.400
Davidson	5	–	11	.313	11	–	19	.367
La Salle	2	–	14	.125	5	–	25	.167
† 2016 A10 Tournament winner As of March 25, 2016; Rankings from AP poll

The 2015–16 Duquesne Dukes women's basketball team represented Duquesne University during the 2015–16 NCAA Division I women's basketball season. The Dukes, led by third year head coach Dan Burt. The Dukes were members of the Atlantic 10 Conference and played their home games at the Palumbo Center. They finished the season 28–6, 13–3 in A-10 play to share the A-10 regular season title with George Washington and Saint Louis. They advanced to the championship game of the A-10 women's tournament where they lost to George Washington. They received an at-large bid to the NCAA women's tournament for the first time in school history where they defeated Seton Hall in the first round before getting blown out by Connecticut in the second round. With 28 wins in the regular season, the most wins in school history.

== 2015–16 media ==
=== Duquesne Dukes Sports Network ===
All Duquesne Dukes home games and select road games will be broadcast by Red Zone Media with Alex Panormios and Tad Maurey providing the call. Road games not done by Red Zone Media can usually be heard on the home teams radio feed. Most home games will also be featured on the A-10 Digital Network. Select games will be televised.

== Roster ==
2015–16 Duquesne Dukes women's basketball team
Players
Coaches

Pos.	#	Name	Height	Year	Previous school	Hometown
G	2	Deva'Nyar Workman	5 ft 10 in (1.78 m)	Sr	Reading; Jacksonville JC	Reading, PA
G	4	Chassidy Omogrosso	5 ft 6 in (1.68 m)	Fr	Blackhawk	Beaver Falls, PA
G/F	10	Paige Cannon	6 ft 1 in (1.85 m)	Fr	Johnstown-Monroe	Johnstown, OH
G	13	Juca Vojinovic	5 ft 10 in (1.78 m)	Fr	Sportska Gimnazija Beograd	Belgrade, Serbia
F	14	Eniko Kuttor	6 ft 1 in (1.85 m)	Fr	Dániel Berzsenyi Evangélikus	Budapest, Hungary
F	15	Amadea Szamosi	6 ft 3 in (1.91 m)	Jr	Ciszterci Rend Pesi Nagy Lajos Gimnaziuma	Pécs, Hungary
G	21	Erin Waskowiak	5 ft 11 in (1.8 m)	So	Bishop Canevin	Pittsburgh, PA
G	22	Conor Richardson	5 ft 10 in (1.78 m)	Fr	Carlynton	Pittsburgh, PA
G	32	April Robinson	5 ft 8 in (1.73 m)	Sr	West Springfield	Springfield, VA
G/F	42	Kadri-Ann Lass	6 ft 3 in (1.91 m)	Fr	Audentese Spordigumnaasium	Tallinn, Estonia
F	43	Judith Sole	6 ft 3 in (1.91 m)	RS Jr	IES Joaquim Blume; Robert Morris	Igualada, Spain
G	45	Emilie Gronas	5 ft 7 in (1.7 m)	Sr	Olsvikåsen vgs Cowley CC	Bergen, Norway
F	54	Angela Staffileno	6 ft 2 in (1.88 m)	Fr	Brooke	Wellsburg, WV
G	55	Brianna Thomas	6 ft 0 in (1.83 m)	Jr	Notre Dame	Ajax, ON

Head coach

Dan Burt (West Liberty State)

Assistant coach(es)

Eddie Benton (Vermont)
Matt Schmidt (West Liberty State)
Rachel Wojdowski (NYU)

Legend

- (C) Team captain
- (S) Suspended
- (I) Ineligible
- (W) Walk-on
- Injured
- Current redshirt

Roster

== Schedule ==
Date time, TV	Rank^{#}	Opponent^{#}	Result	Record	Site (attendance) city, state
Non-conference regular season
11/13/2015*; 7:00 pm		at Saint Peter's	W 63–38	1–0	Yanitelli Center (502); Jersey City, NJ
11/15/2015*; 2:00 pm		at Princeton	L 66–94	1–1	Jadwin Gymnasium (578); Princeton, NJ
11/20/2015*; 7:00 pm		at Lafayette	W 73–65	2–1	Kirby Sports Center (377); Easton, PA
11/24/2015*; 7:00 pm		Howard	W 86–62	3–1	Palumbo Center (220); Pittsburgh, PA
11/27/2015*; 5:00 pm		vs. North Carolina A&T; UNM Thanksgiving Tournament semifinals	W 81–67	4–1	The Pit; Albuquerque, NM
11/28/2015*; 6:00 pm		at New Mexico; UNM Thanksgiving Tournament championship	W 78–69	5–1	The Pit (5,111); Albuquerque, NM
12/03/2015*; 7:00 pm, ESPN3		at Central Michigan	W 68–49	6–1	McGuirk Arena (1,450); Mount Pleasant, MI
12/06/2015*; 2:00 pm, ESPN3		at Buffalo	W 79–62	7–1	Alumni Arena (832); Amherst, NY
12/09/2015*; 7:00 pm		Maryland Eastern Shore	W 95–59	8–1	Palumbo Center (276); Pittsburgh, PA
12/13/2015*; 2:00 pm		Ohio	W 64–47	9–1	Palumbo Center (599); Pittsburgh, PA
12/15/2015*; 7:00 pm		Slippery Rock	W 79–54	10–1	Palumbo Center (550); Pittsburgh, PA
12/19/2015*; 4:30 pm		No. 25 St. John's	W 76–57	11–1	Palumbo Center (402); Pittsburgh, PA
12/30/2015*; 2:30 pm		at Pittsburgh; City Game	W 79–65	12–1	Peterson Events Center (2,377); Pittsburgh, PA
Atlantic 10 regular season
01/03/2016; 1:00 pm, CBSSN		Dayton	W 89–58	13–1 (1–0)	Palumbo Center (762); Pittsburgh, PA
01/07/2016; 7:00 pm		at George Mason	W 72–56	14–1 (2–0)	EagleBank Arena (582); Fairfax, VA
01/10/2016; 12:00 pm, CBSSN		Fordham	W 55–40	15–1 (3–0)	Palumbo Center (704); Pittsburgh, PA
01/13/2016; 7:00 pm		at Rhode Island	W 79–70	16–1 (4–0)	Ryan Center (334); Kingston, RI
01/17/2016; 12:00 pm, ESPNU		George Washington	L 52–70	16–2 (4–1)	Palumbo Center (1,203); Pittsburgh, PA
01/23/2016; 2:00 pm		St. Bonaventure	W 74–62	17–2 (5–1)	Palumbo Center (652); Pittsburgh, PA
01/28/2016; 7:00 pm		at Richmond	W 65–44	18–2 (6–1)	Robins Center (759); Richmond, VA
01/31/2016; 1:00 pm		at VCU	W 71–67	19–2 (7–1)	Siegel Center (1,077); Richmond, VA
02/03/2016; 7:00 pm		Massachusetts	W 73–64 ^{OT}	20–2 (8–1)	Palumbo Center (747); Pittsburgh, PA
02/06/2016; 2:00 pm		at Davidson	W 77–62	21–2 (9–1)	John M. Belk Arena (584); Davidson, NC
02/10/2016; 7:00 pm		Rhode Island	W 61–56	22–2 (10–1)	Palumbo Center (498); Pittsburgh, PA
02/13/2016; 2:00 pm		Saint Joseph's	W 73–59	23–2 (11–1)	Palumbo Center (970); Pittsburgh, PA
02/18/2016; 8:00 pm		at Saint Louis	L 81–84	23–3 (11–2)	Chaifetz Arena (837); St. Louis, MO
02/21/2016; 1:00 pm, ASN		at Dayton	W 76–72 ^{OT}	24–3 (12–2)	UD Arena (2,698); Dayton, OH
02/24/2016; 7:00 pm		La Salle	W 74–49	25–3 (13–2)	Palumbo Center (595); Pittsburgh, PA
02/28/2016; 1:00 pm		at St. Bonaventure	L 48–60	25–4 (13–3)	Reilly Center (1,370); Olean, NY
Atlantic 10 Tournament
03/04/2016; 7:00 pm, ASN	(3)	vs. (6) Fordham; Quarterfinals	W 70–65	26–4	Richmond Coliseum (2,041); Richmond, VA
03/05/2016; 1:30 pm, CBSSN	(3)	vs. (2) Saint Louis; Semifinals	W 56–52	27–4	Richmond Coliseum (1,335); Richmond, VA
03/06/2016; 1:00 pm, ESPNU	(3)	vs. (1) George Washington; Championship Game	L 60–63	27–5	Richmond Coliseum (2,673); Richmond, VA
NCAA Women's Tournament
03/19/2016*; 1:30 pm, ESPN2	(9 B)	vs. (8 B) Seton Hall; First Round	W 97–76	28–5	Gampel Pavilion; Storrs, CT
03/21/2016*; 9:00 pm, ESPN2	(9 B)	at (1 B) No. 1 Connecticut; Second Round	L 51–97	28–6	Gampel Pavilion (6,316); Storrs, CT
*Non-conference game. ^{#}Rankings from AP Poll. (#) Tournament seedings in parentheses. B=Bridgeport Region. All times are in Eastern Time.

== Rankings ==
2015–16 NCAA Division I women's basketball rankings

Regular season polls
Poll	Pre- Season	Week 2	Week 3	Week 4	Week 5	Week 6	Week 7	Week 8	Week 9	Week 10	Week 11	Week 12	Week 13	Week 14	Week 15	Week 16	Week 17	Week 18	Week 19	Final
AP	NR	NR	NR	NR	NR	NR	NR	NR	RV	RV	NR	NR	RV	RV	RV	RV	NR	NR	NR	N/A
Coaches	NR	NR	NR	NR	NR	NR	RV	RV	RV	25т	RV	RV	RV	24т	23	RV	RV	RV	RV	RV

Legend
	Increase in ranking
	Decrease in ranking
	No change
(RV)	Received votes
(NR)	Not ranked

== See also ==
- 2015–16 Duquesne Dukes men's basketball team
