= 2015–16 George Mason Patriots women's basketball team =

American college basketball season

2015–16 George Mason Patriots women's basketball
- Conference: Atlantic 10 Conference
- Record: 12–19 (6–10 A-10)
- Head coach: Nyla Milleson (3rd season)
- Assistant coaches: Tajama Abraham Ngongba; Bob Dunn; Christopher Lewis
- Home arena: EagleBank Arena

2015–16 Atlantic 10 women's basketball standings
	Conf.				Overall
Team	W		L	PCT	W		L	PCT
Duquesne	13	–	3	.813	28	–	6	.824
George Washington †	13	–	3	.813	26	–	7	.788
Saint Louis	13	–	3	.813	26	–	8	.765
St. Bonaventure	12	–	4	.750	24	–	8	.750
VCU	10	–	6	.625	23	–	10	.697
Saint Joseph's	8	–	8	.500	14	–	15	.483
Fordham	8	–	8	.500	14	–	17	.452
Dayton	7	–	9	.438	14	–	15	.483
George Mason	6	–	10	.375	12	–	19	.387
Richmond	5	–	11	.313	13	–	18	.419
Rhode Island	5	–	11	.313	12	–	18	.400
UMass	5	–	11	.313	12	–	18	.400
Davidson	5	–	11	.313	11	–	19	.367
La Salle	2	–	14	.125	5	–	25	.167
† 2016 A10 Tournament winner As of March 25, 2016; Rankings from AP poll

The 2015–16 George Mason Patriots women's basketball team represented George Mason University during the 2015–2016 College Basketball season. The Patriots, led by third year head coach Nyla Milleson. The George Mason Patriots are members of the Atlantic 10 Conference and play their home games at EagleBank Arena. They finished the season 12–19, 6–10 A-10 play to finish in ninth place. They advanced to the quarterfinals of the A-10 women's tournament where they lost to George Washington.

== 2015–2016 Media ==
=== George Mason Patriots Sports Network ===
Patriots games will be broadcast on WGMU Radio and streamed online through Patriot Vision. Most home games will also be featured on the A-10 Digital Network. Select games will be televised.

== Roster ==
2015–16 George Mason Patriots women's basketball team
Players
Coaches

Pos.	#	Name	Height	Year	Previous school	Hometown
G	4	Desare Williams	5 ft 6 in (1.68 m)	So	Stonewall Jackson	Manassas, VA
G	5	Reana Mohamed	5 ft 8 in (1.73 m)	Sr	Mary Louis Academy	Laurelton, NY
G	10	Jewel Triggs	5 ft 11 in (1.8 m)	Fr	Thibodaux	Thibodaux, LA
G	11	Katrina Hutzell	5 ft 11 in (1.8 m)	RS Jr	Chantilly; UMBC	Chantilly, VA
G/F	12	Kara Wright	5 ft 11 in (1.8 m)	RS Jr	DuPont Manual; Southeast Missouri State	Louisville, KY
C	13	Bridget O'Donnell	6 ft 6 in (1.98 m)	RS Jr	Montgomery; UMBC	Belle Mead, NJ
G	14	Sylvia Maxwell	5 ft 7 in (1.7 m)	RS Jr	Waverly; Niagara	Lansing, MI
F	20	Chinyere Bell	5 ft 11 in (1.8 m)	Fr	South View	Fayetteville, NC
F	21	Casey Davis	6 ft 2 in (1.88 m)	So	Elizabeth Seton	Gambrills, MD
F	24	Tiffany Padgett	6 ft 1 in (1.85 m)	RS Sr	St. Vincent Pallotti; Loyola (MD)	Laurel, MD
G	31	Taylor Brown	5 ft 7 in (1.7 m)	RS Sr	Bishop McNamara; Georgetown	Bowie, MD
G	32	Tayler Dodson	5 ft 11 in (1.8 m)	So	Spotswood	Harrisonburg, VA
F	33	Kristi Mokube	6 ft 2 in (1.88 m)	RS Sr	Central; Florida State	Phenix City, AL

Head coach

- Nyla Milleson (Kansas State)

Assistant coach(es)

- Tajama Abraham Ngongba (George Washington)
- Bob Dunn (Dayton)
- Christopher Lewis (Emporia State)

Legend

- (C) Team captain
- (S) Suspended
- (I) Ineligible
- (W) Walk-on
- Injured
- Current redshirt

Roster

== Schedule ==
Date time, TV	Rank^{#}	Opponent^{#}	Result	Record	Site (attendance) city, state
Exhibition
11/03/2015*; 7:00 pm		Central Methodist	W 74–54		EagleBank Arena; Fairfax, VA
Non-conference regular season
11/13/2015*; 7:00 pm		at Radford	L 63–66 ^{OT}	0–1	Dedmon Center (720); Radford, VA
11/15/2015*; 5:00 pm		at Virginia Tech	L 63–80	0–2	Cassell Coliseum (1,172); Blacksburg, VA
11/17/2015*; 7:00 pm		Towson	W 78–66	1–2	EagleBank Arena (667); Fairfax, VA
11/20/2015*; 9:00 pm		at Utah	L 62–74	1–3	Jon M. Huntsman Center (792); Salt Lake City, UT
11/24/2015*; 10:00 pm		vs. WKU; Great Alaska Shootout semifinals	L 58–84	1–4	Alaska Airlines Center (2,299); Anchorage, AK
11/25/2015*; 6:30 pm		vs. Pepperdine; Great Alaska Shootout 3rd place game	W 71–63	2–4	Alaska Airlines Center (2,220); Anchorage, AK
11/28/2015*; 3:00 pm		at UNLV; Lady Rebel Round-Up semifinals	L 59–67	2–5	Cox Pavilion; Paradise, NV
11/29/2015*; 3:00 pm		vs. Tulsa; Lady Rebel Round-Up 3rd place game	W 64–63	3–5	Cox Pavilion; Paradise, NV
12/02/2015*; 7:00 pm		Georgetown	L 57–63	3–6	EagleBank Arena (621); Fairfax, VA
12/07/2015*; 7:00 pm		Delaware	W 90–83 ^{2OT}	4–6	EagleBank Arena (333); Fairfax, VA
12/19/2015*; 1:00 pm		Air Force	W 69–52	5–6	Recreation & Athletic Complex (419); Fairfax, VA
12/23/2015*; 7:00 pm		at Auburn	L 59–88	5–7	Auburn Arena (1,817); Auburn, AL
12/29/2015*; 4:00 pm		at Arizona	L 60–68 ^{OT}	5–8	McKale Center (990); Tucson, AZ
Atlantic 10 regular season
01/02/2016; 2:00 pm		at Saint Louis	W 73–63 ^{OT}	6–8 (1–0)	Chaifetz Arena (1,007); St. Louis, MO
01/07/2016; 7:00 pm		Duquesne	L 56–72	6–9 (1–1)	EagleBank Arena (582); Fairfax, VA
01/10/2016; 2:00 pm		La Salle	W 79–70	7–9 (2–1)	EagleBank Arena (482); Fairfax, VA
01/13/2016; 12:00 pm		at Fordham	L 54–66	7–10 (2–2)	Rose Hill Gymnasium (2,410); Bronx, NY
01/16/2016; 1:00 pm		at St. Bonaventure	L 55–70	7–11 (2–3)	Reilly Center (1,221); Olean, NY
01/20/2016; 7:00 pm		VCU	W 70–54	8–11 (3–3)	EagleBank Arena (402); Fairfax, VA
01/22/2016; 12:00 pm		at George Washington	L 68–82	8–12 (3–4)	Charles E. Smith Center (502); Washington, D.C.
01/28/2016; 7:00 pm		Saint Louis	L 50–61	8–13 (3–5)	EagleBank Arena (502); Fairfax, VA
01/30/2016; 2:00 pm		Massachusetts	W 64–59	9–13 (4–5)	EagleBank Arena (566); Fairfax, VA
02/03/2016; 7:00 pm		at Davidson	L 63–68	9–14 (4–6)	John M. Belk Arena (531); Davidson, NC
02/07/2016; 2:00 pm, ASN		Saint Joseph's	W 55–41	10–14 (5–6)	EagleBank Arena (1,464); Fairfax, VA
02/10/2016; 7:00 pm		at Dayton	L 58–81	10–15 (5–7)	UD Arena (1,647); Dayton, OH
02/13/2016; 2:00 pm		at Rhode Island	W 58–55	11–15 (6–7)	Ryan Center (450); Kingston, RI
02/20/2016; 2:00 pm		Richmond	L 50–57	11–16 (6–8)	EagleBank Arena (922); Fairfax, VA
02/24/2016; 7:00 pm		at VCU	L 34–65	11–17 (6–9)	Siegel Center (1,180); Richmond, VA
02/27/2016; 2:00 pm		George Washington	L 66–73	11–18 (6–10)	EagleBank Arena (947); Fairfax, VA
Atlantic 10 Women's Tournament
03/03/2016; 11:30 am		vs. Dayton; Second Round	W 66–62	12–18	Richmond Coliseum; Richmond, VA
03/04/2016; 11:30 am, ASN		vs. George Washington; Quarterfinals	L 48–78	12–19	Richmond Coliseum; Richmond, VA
*Non-conference game. ^{#}Rankings from AP Poll. (#) Tournament seedings in parentheses. All times are in Eastern Time.

== Rankings ==
2015–16 NCAA Division I women's basketball rankings

Regular season polls
Poll	Pre- Season	Week 2	Week 3	Week 4	Week 5	Week 6	Week 7	Week 8	Week 9	Week 10	Week 11	Week 12	Week 13	Week 14	Week 15	Week 16	Week 17	Week 18	Final
AP																			
Coaches																			

Legend
	Increase in ranking
	Decrease in ranking
	No change
(RV)	Received votes
(NR)	Not ranked

== See also ==
- 2015–16 George Mason Patriots men's basketball team
