= Jonathan Tsipis =

American basketball coach

Current position
- Title: Head coach
- Team: Western Carolina
- Conference: SoCon
- Record: 16–43 (.271)

Biographical details
- Born: November 7, 1972 (age 54); Cleveland, Ohio, U.S.
- Education: North Carolina

Coaching career (HC unless noted)
- 1996–1999: Cornell (Men's asst.)
- 1999–2000: Le Moyne (Men's asst.)
- 2000–2002: Elon (Men's asst.)
- 2003–2012: Notre Dame (Women's assoc.)
- 2012–2016: George Washington
- 2016–2021: Wisconsin
- 2024–present: Western Carolina

Administrative career (AD unless noted)
- 2022–2024: Marquette (Advisor for Scouting and Analytics)

Head coaching record
- Overall: 158–180 (.467)

Accomplishments and honors

Championships
- 2 Atlantic 10 regular season (2015, 2016); 2 Atlantic 10 Tournament (2015, 2016)

Awards
- Atlantic 10 Coach of the Year (2015)

Jonathan Peter Tsipis (born November 7, 1972) is the current head coach of the Western Carolina women's team. Previously, he was the head coach of the Wisconsin Badgers women's basketball team.

== Career ==
He was previously the head coach of the George Washington University women's basketball team, where he had an overall record of 92–38 in four years. During the 2014–15 season he led George Washington to an overall record of 29–4 and A10 regular season and tournament championships. He was named the A10 Coach of the Year at the end of the 2014–2015 regular season. The team made the 2015 and 2016 NCAA tournaments.

Prior to becoming the head coach at George Washington University he was an assistant coach, and then associate head coach, for the Notre Dame women's basketball team. During his time there the team went 228–77 (.748) and reached the NCAA tournament every year, highlighted by three Sweet Sixteens (2004, 2008, 2010) and two National Championship games (2011, 2012).

On March 23, 2016, Tsipis was introduced as the seventh head coach in Wisconsin women's basketball history. He signed a five-year contract through 2021. In the first-year of the contract, he was paid $633,000. He was paid $625,000 in 2017–18 and was paid $650,000 for the remaining duration of the contract. In 2018, Wisconsin extended Tsipis through the 2022–23 season. On March 9, 2021, Wisconsin fired Tsipis.

Tsipis signed one recruit after the conclusion of his first year as head coach at Wisconsin, Niya Beverley. His recruiting class for the 2018–19 season featured three top-100 players and was one of the highest ranked classes in program history, with another top 100 player transferring to Wisconsin.

== Head coaching record ==
Record table
Season	Team	Overall	Conference	Standing	Postseason
George Washington Colonials (Atlantic 10 Conference) (2012–2016)
2012–13	George Washington	14–16	7–7	T–7th	
2013–14	George Washington	23–11	11–5	T–2nd	WNIT Third Round
2014–15	George Washington	29–4	15–1	1st	NCAA First Round
2015–16	George Washington	26–7	13–3	T–1st	NCAA First Round
George Washington:		92–38 (.708)	46–16 (.742)		
Wisconsin Badgers (Big Ten Conference) (2016–2021)
2016–17	Wisconsin	9–22	3–13	T–11th	
2017–18	Wisconsin	9–21	2–14	13th	
2018–19	Wisconsin	15–18	4–14	13th	
2019–20	Wisconsin	11–18	3–15	13th	
2020–21	Wisconsin	5–19	2–18	14th	
Wisconsin:		50–99 (.336)	14–74 (.159)		
Western Carolina Catamounts (Southern Conference) (2024–present)
2024–25	Western Carolina	13–17	3–11	7th	
2025–26	Western Carolina	3–26	0–14	8th	
Western Carolina:		16–43 (.271)	3–25 (.107)		
Total:		158–180 (.467)			
National champion Postseason invitational champion Conference regular season champion Conference regular season and conference tournament champion Division regular season champion Division regular season and conference tournament champion Conference tournament champion
