= 2016 Atlantic 10 women's basketball tournament =

- Classification: Division I
- Season: 2015–16
- Teams: 14
- Site: Richmond Coliseum; Richmond, VA
- Champions: George Washington (6th title)
- Winning coach: Jonathan Tsipis (2nd title)
- MVP: Caira Washington (George Washington)
- Television: A10 Digital, ASN, CBSSN, ESPNU

2015–16 Atlantic 10 women's basketball standings
	Conf.				Overall
Team	W		L	PCT	W		L	PCT
Duquesne	13	–	3	.813	28	–	6	.824
George Washington †	13	–	3	.813	26	–	7	.788
Saint Louis	13	–	3	.813	26	–	8	.765
St. Bonaventure	12	–	4	.750	24	–	8	.750
VCU	10	–	6	.625	23	–	10	.697
Saint Joseph's	8	–	8	.500	14	–	15	.483
Fordham	8	–	8	.500	14	–	17	.452
Dayton	7	–	9	.438	14	–	15	.483
George Mason	6	–	10	.375	12	–	19	.387
Richmond	5	–	11	.313	13	–	18	.419
Rhode Island	5	–	11	.313	12	–	18	.400
UMass	5	–	11	.313	12	–	18	.400
Davidson	5	–	11	.313	11	–	19	.367
La Salle	2	–	14	.125	5	–	25	.167
† 2016 A10 Tournament winner As of March 25, 2016; Rankings from AP poll

The 2016 Atlantic 10 women's basketball tournament was a tournament that played March 2–6 at the Richmond Coliseum in Richmond, Virginia.

George Washington defeated Duquesne in the championship game.

== Seeds ==
Teams are seeded by record within the conference, with a tiebreaker system to seed teams with identical conference records.

Seed	School	Conf (Overall)	Tiebreaker
#1	George Washington	13–3 (23–6)	2–0 vs. Saint Louis, Duquesne
#2	Saint Louis	13–3 (23–6)	1–1 vs. GW, Duquesne
#3	Duquesne	13–3 (25–4)	0–2 vs. Saint Louis, GW
#4	St. Bonaventure	12–4 (23–6)	
#5	VCU	10–6 (21–8)	
#6	Fordham	8–8 (13–16)	1–1 vs. Saint Joe's; 1–0 vs. GW
#7	Saint Joseph's	8–8 (14–14)	1–1 vs. Fordham; 0–1 vs. GW
#8	Dayton	7–9 (14–13)	
#9	George Mason	6–10 (11–18)	
#10	Rhode Island	5–11 (11–17)	3–1 vs. Davidson, Richmond, UMass
#11	UMass	5–11 (11–17)	2–2 vs. Davidson, URI, Richmond
#12	Davidson	5–11 (11–18)	1–2 vs. URI, UMass; 1–0 vs. Richmond
#13	Richmond	5–11 (12–17)	1–2 vs. URI, UMass; 0–1 vs. Davidson
#14	La Salle	2–14 (5–24)	

== Schedule ==
Session	Game	Time*	Matchup^{#}	Television	Attendance
First round - Wednesday, March 2
1	1	4:30 pm	#13 Richmond vs. #12 Davidson	A10 Net	604
1	2	7:00 pm	#14 La Salle vs. #11 UMass	A10 Net	604
Second round - Thursday, March 3
2	3	11:30 am	#9 George Mason vs. #8 Dayton	A10 Net	
2	4	2:00 pm	#13 Richmond vs. #5 VCU	A10 Net	
3	5	4:30 pm	#10 Rhode Island vs. #7 Saint Joseph's	A10 Net	
3	6	7:00 pm	#11 UMass vs. #6 Fordham	A10 Net	
Quarterfinals - Friday, March 4
4	7	11:30 am	#9 George Mason vs. #1 George Washington	ASN	
4	8	2:00 pm	#5 VCU vs. #4 St. Bonventure	ASN	
5	9	4:30 pm	#10 Rhode Island vs. #2 Saint Louis	ASN	2,041
5	10	7:00 pm	#6 Fordham vs. #3 Duquesne	ASN	2,041
Semifinals - Saturday, March 5
6	11	11:00 am	#1 George Washington vs. #5 VCU	CBSSN	1,335
6	12	1:30 pm	#2 Saint Louis vs. #3 Duquesne	CBSSN	1,335
Championship - Sunday, March 6
7	13	1:00 pm	#1 George Washington vs. #3 Duquesne	ESPNU	2,673

*Game times in Eastern Time. #Rankings denote tournament seeding.

== Bracket ==
First round Wednesday, March 2
12	Davidson	51
13	Richmond	70
11	UMass	81
14	La Salle	65

Second round Thursday, March 3
8	Dayton	62
9	George Mason	66
5	VCU	62
13	Richmond	42
7	Saint Joseph's	76
10	Rhode Island	81
6	Fordham	73^{OT}
11	UMass	62

Quarterfinals; Friday, March 4 ASN
1	George Washington	78
9	George Mason	48
4	St. Bonaventure	50
5	VCU	59
2	Saint Louis	70
10	Rhode Island	59
3	Duquesne	70
6	Fordham	65

Semifinals; Saturday, March 5 CBSSN
1	George Washington	72
5	VCU	58
2	Saint Louis	52
3	Duquesne	56

Championship; Sunday, March 6 ESPNU
1	George Washington	63
3	Duquesne	60

== See also ==
2016 Atlantic 10 men's basketball tournament
