= 2015–16 VCU Rams women's basketball team =

Intercollegiate basketball season

2015–16 VCU Rams women's basketball

WNIT, First Round
- Conference: Atlantic 10 Conference
- Record: 23–10 (10–6 A-10)
- Head coach: Beth O'Boyle (2nd season)
- Assistant coaches: Karen Blair; Nerlande Nicolas; Richard Fortune
- Home arena: Stuart C. Siegel Center

2015–16 Atlantic 10 women's basketball standings
	Conf.				Overall
Team	W		L	PCT	W		L	PCT
Duquesne	13	–	3	.813	28	–	6	.824
George Washington †	13	–	3	.813	26	–	7	.788
Saint Louis	13	–	3	.813	26	–	8	.765
St. Bonaventure	12	–	4	.750	24	–	8	.750
VCU	10	–	6	.625	23	–	10	.697
Saint Joseph's	8	–	8	.500	14	–	15	.483
Fordham	8	–	8	.500	14	–	17	.452
Dayton	7	–	9	.438	14	–	15	.483
George Mason	6	–	10	.375	12	–	19	.387
Richmond	5	–	11	.313	13	–	18	.419
Rhode Island	5	–	11	.313	12	–	18	.400
UMass	5	–	11	.313	12	–	18	.400
Davidson	5	–	11	.313	11	–	19	.367
La Salle	2	–	14	.125	5	–	25	.167
† 2016 A10 Tournament winner As of March 25, 2016; Rankings from AP poll

The 2015–16 VCU Rams women's basketball team represented Virginia Commonwealth University during the 2015–16 college basketball season. Led by second-year head coach Beth O'Boyle, the Rams were members of the Atlantic 10 Conference and played their home games at the Stuart C. Siegel Center. They finished the season with a 23–10 overall record and a 10–6 mark in A-10 play to finish in fifth place. They advanced to the semifinals of the A-10 women's tournament, where they lost to George Washington. They were invited to the Women's National Invitation Tournament, where they lost to Virginia in the first round.

== 2015–16 media ==
All non-televised Rams home games and conference road games were streamed on the A-10 Digital Network.

== Roster ==
2015–16 VCU Rams women's basketball team
Players
Coaches

Pos.	#	Name	Height	Year	Previous school	Hometown
G	0	Ashley Pegram	5 ft 8 in (1.73 m)	Jr	Meadowbrook; Chesapeake College	Richmond, VA
G	1	Galaisha Goodhope	5 ft 5 in (1.65 m)	RS Jr	Princess Anne; Old Dominion	Norfolk, VA
G	3	Jessica Ogunnorin	6 ft 1 in (1.85 m)	RS Sr	ACS Athens; Stony Brook	Athens, Greece
G	5	Chadarryl Clay	5 ft 8 in (1.73 m)	RS Jr	Girls Preparatory School; Auburn	Chattanooga, TN
G/F	20	Adaeze Alaeze	5 ft 10 in (1.78 m)	Sr	Roland Park	Baltimore, MD
G	21	Ashlee Mitchell	5 ft 7 in (1.7 m)	Jr	Tennessee	Bristol, TN
G	22	Katherine Strong	5 ft 11 in (1.8 m)	Fr	Bloom	Chicago Heights, IL
F	23	Sandra Skinner	6 ft 1 in (1.85 m)	Fr	George Rogers Clark	Winchester, KY
F	25	Curteeona Brelove	6 ft 2 in (1.88 m)	So	Malone	Malone, FL
F	32	Bria Gibson	6 ft 1 in (1.85 m)	Fr	Sanderson	Columbia, MD
G	34	Keira Robinson	5 ft 8 in (1.73 m)	Jr	Keenan	Columbia, SC
G/F	44	Camille Calhoun	6 ft 0 in (1.83 m)	So	Archbishop Spalding	Bowie, MD
G	45	Isis Thorpe	5 ft 8 in (1.73 m)	So	Reading	Reading, PA
F/C	55	Melanie Royster	6 ft 3 in (1.91 m)	RS Jr	Elizabeth Seton	Bowie, MD

Head coach

- Beth O'Boyle (Gettysburg)

Assistant coach(es)

- Karen Blair (SMU)
- Nerlande Nicholas (Rutgers–Newark)
- Richard Fortune (Virginia State)

Legend

- (C) Team captain
- (S) Suspended
- (I) Ineligible
- (W) Walk-on
- Injured
- Current redshirt

Roster

== Schedule ==
Date time, TV	Rank^{#}	Opponent^{#}	Result	Record	Site (attendance) city, state
Non-conference regular season
11/13/2015*; 11:00 am		Coppin State	W 73–42	1–0	Siegel Center (2,259); Richmond, VA
11/17/2015*; 7:00 pm		at Iona	W 74–58	2–0	Hynes Athletic Center (350); New Rochelle, NY
11/21/2015*; 7:00 pm		at IUPUI	L 69–70	2–1	The Jungle (267); Indianapolis, IN
11/24/2015*; 7:00 pm		Campbell	W 57–34	3–1	Siegel Center (514); Richmond, VA
11/29/2015*; 1:00 pm		Furman	W 67–45	4–1	Siegel Center (467); Richmond, VA
12/02/2015*; 7:00 pm		UNC Wilmington	W 58–45	5–1	Siegel Center (365); Richmond, VA
12/05/2015*; 4:00 pm		at No. 17 Arizona State; ASU Classic semifinals	W 57–48	6–1	Wells Fargo Arena (1,430); Tempe, AZ
12/06/2015*; 4:30 pm		vs. Toledo; ASU Classic championship	L 61–80	6–2	Wells Fargo Arena; Tempe, AZ
12/13/2015*; 1:00 pm		Maryland Eastern Shore	W 63–39	7–2	Siegel Center (913); Richmond, VA
12/16/2015*; 7:00 pm		at High Point	W 69–39	8–2	Millis Center (539); High Point, NC
12/19/2015*; 7:30 pm		Old Dominion; Rivalry	W 74–54	9–2	Siegel Center (1,242); Richmond, VA
12/21/2015*; 7:00 pm		William & Mary	W 73–47	10–2	Siegel Center (520); Richmond, VA
12/30/2015*; 2:00 pm		at North Carolina A&T	W 64–49	11–2	Corbett Sports Center (446); Greensboro, NC
Atlantic 10 regular season
01/02/2016; 2:00 pm		at Massachusetts	W 74–66	12–2 (1–0)	Mullins Center (385); Amherst, MA
01/07/2016; 7:00 pm		Saint Louis	L 72–77	12–3 (1–1)	Siegel Center (382); Richmond, VA
01/10/2016; 1:00 pm		Saint Joseph's	L 63–66	12–4 (1–2)	Siegel Center (687); Richmond, VA
01/13/2016; 7:00 pm		at Dayton	W 74–72	13–4 (2–2)	UD Arena (2,005); Dayton, OH
01/17/2016; 6:00 pm, CBSSN		Davidson	L 50–56	13–5 (2–3)	Siegel Center (933); Richmond, VA
01/20/2016; 7:00 pm		at George Mason; Rivalry	L 54–70	13–6 (2–4)	EagleBank Arena (402); Fairfax, VA
01/25/2016; 7:00 pm		at Richmond; Capital City Classic	W 53–42	14–6 (3–4)	Robins Center (639); Richmond, VA
01/27/2016; 7:00 pm		Fordham	W 61–51	15–6 (4–4)	Siegel Center (524); Richmond, VA
01/31/2016; 1:00 pm		Duquesne	L 67–71	15–7 (4–5)	Siegel Center (1,077); Richmond, VA
02/03/2016; 7:00 pm		St. Bonaventure	W 52–47	16–7 (5–5)	Siegel Center; Richmond, VA
02/07/2016; 1:00 pm		at La Salle	W 84–76 ^{OT}	17–7 (6–5)	Tom Gola Arena (463); Philadelphia, PA
02/14/2016; 1:00 pm		Richmond; Capital City Classic	L 50–62	17–8 (6–6)	Siegel Center (1,303); Richmond, VA
02/17/2016; 7:00 pm		at Rhode Island	W 49–36	18–8 (7–6)	Ryan Center (540); Kingston, RI
02/20/2016; 3:00 pm		at George Washington	W 79–68	19–8 (8–6)	Charles E. Smith Center (2,097); Washington, D.C.
02/24/2016; 7:00 pm		George Mason; Rivalry	W 65–34	20–8 (9–6)	Siegel Center (1,180); Richmond, VA
02/27/2016; 2:00 pm		at Davidson	W 74–59	21–8 (10–6)	John M. Belk Arena (742); Davidson, NC
Atlantic 10 Women's Tournament
03/03/2016; 2:00 pm		vs. Richmond; Second Round	W 62–42	22–8	Richmond Coliseum; Richmond, VA
03/04/2016; 2:00 pm, ASN		vs. St. Bonaventure; Quarterfinals	W 59–50	23–8	Richmond Coliseum; Richmond, VA
03/05/2016; 11:00 am, CBSSN		vs. George Washington; Semifinals	L 58–72	23–9	Richmond Coliseum; Richmond, VA
WNIT
03/17/2016*; 7:00 pm		Virginia; First Round	L 50–52	23–10	Sigel Center (859); Richmond, VA
*Non-conference game. ^{#}Rankings from AP Poll. (#) Tournament seedings in parentheses. All times are in Eastern Time.

== Rankings ==
+ Regular season polls	Poll	Pre- season	Week 2	Week 3	Week 4	Week 5	Week 6	Week 7	Week 8	Week 9	Week 10	Week 11	Week 12	Week 13	Week 14	Week 15	Week 16	Week 17	Week 18	Final
AP	NR	NR	NR	NR	RV	NR	NR	NR	NR	NR	NR	NR	NR	NR	NR	NR	NR	NR	NR	
Coaches	NR	NR	NR	NR	NR	NR	NR	NR	NR	NR	NR	NR	NR	NR	NR	NR	NR	NR	NR	

Legend
	Increase in ranking
	Decrease in ranking
	Not ranked previous week
(RV)	Received Votes

== See also ==
- 2015–16 VCU Rams men's basketball team
