= 2015–16 George Washington Colonials women's basketball team =

Intercollegiate basketball season

2015–16 George Washington Colonials women's basketball

A-10 Regular Season co-champions & Tournament Champions

NCAA Women's Tournament, first round
- Conference: Atlantic 10 Conference
- Record: 26–7 (13–3 A-10)
- Head coach: Jonathan Tsipis (4th season)
- Assistant coaches: Diane Richardson; Melissa Dunne; Zach Kancher
- Home arena: Charles E. Smith Center

2015–16 Atlantic 10 women's basketball standings
	Conf.				Overall
Team	W		L	PCT	W		L	PCT
Duquesne	13	–	3	.813	28	–	6	.824
George Washington †	13	–	3	.813	26	–	7	.788
Saint Louis	13	–	3	.813	26	–	8	.765
St. Bonaventure	12	–	4	.750	24	–	8	.750
VCU	10	–	6	.625	23	–	10	.697
Saint Joseph's	8	–	8	.500	14	–	15	.483
Fordham	8	–	8	.500	14	–	17	.452
Dayton	7	–	9	.438	14	–	15	.483
George Mason	6	–	10	.375	12	–	19	.387
Richmond	5	–	11	.313	13	–	18	.419
Rhode Island	5	–	11	.313	12	–	18	.400
UMass	5	–	11	.313	12	–	18	.400
Davidson	5	–	11	.313	11	–	19	.367
La Salle	2	–	14	.125	5	–	25	.167
† 2016 A10 Tournament winner As of March 25, 2016; Rankings from AP poll

The 2015–16 George Washington Colonials women's basketball team represented George Washington University during the 2015–16 college basketball season. The Colonials, led by fourth year head coach Jonathan Tsipis, were members of the Atlantic 10 Conference and played their home games at the Charles E. Smith Center. They finished the season 26–7, 13–3 in A-10 play to share the A-10 regular season title with Duquesne and Saint Louis. They won the A-10 tournament by defeating Duquesne and received an automatic bid to the NCAA women's tournament, where they lost to Kansas State in the first round.

On March 28, it was announced that Jonathan Tsipis resigned from George Washington to accept the head coaching job at Wisconsin. He finished with a 4-year record of 92–38.

== 2015–16 media ==
=== George Washington Colonials Sports Network ===
WRGW will carry the Colonials games and broadcast them online at GWRadio.com. The A-10 Digital Network will carry all non-televised Colonials home games and most conference road games through RaiseHigh Live.

== Roster ==
2015–16 George Washington Colonials women's basketball team
Players
Coaches

Pos.	#	Name	Height	Year	Previous school	Hometown
F	1	Kelsi Mahoney	6 ft 1 in (1.85 m)	Fr	Jay M. Robinson	Concord, NC
G	2	Camila Tapias	5 ft 6 in (1.68 m)	So	IMG Academy	Bogotá, Colombia
F	3	Caira Washington	6 ft 2 in (1.88 m)	Jr	Georgetown Day School	Brandywine, MD
G	4	Lauren Chase	5 ft 5 in (1.65 m)	RS Sr	Riverdale Baptist; UMBC	Bowie, MD
G	5	Aaliyah Brown	5 ft 8 in (1.73 m)	RS Sr	Clear Springs	League City, TX
G	13	Shannon Cranshaw	5 ft 9 in (1.75 m)	Jr	Father Lopez	Ormond Beach, FL
F	14	DeLacy Anderson	6 ft 1 in (1.85 m)	Sr	Bolingbrook	Bolingbrook, IL
G	15	Mia Farmer	5 ft 8 in (1.73 m)	So	Cardinal O'Hara	Philadelphia, PA
G	20	Hannah Schaible	5 ft 9 in (1.75 m)	Jr	Dr. Phillips	Orlando, FL
G	21	Mei-Lyn Bautista	5 ft 6 in (1.68 m)	Fr	St. Mary's	Whitestone, NY
F	22	Jada Matthews	6 ft 0 in (1.83 m)	So	Winslow Township	Sicklerville, NJ
G	24	Alexis Chandler	5 ft 8 in (1.73 m)	Sr	Cy-Fair	Cypress, TX
C	25	Kelli Prange	6 ft 5 in (1.96 m)	So	Damascus	Damascus, MD
G	34	Brianna Cummings	5 ft 10 in (1.78 m)	So	Greater Atlanta Christian	Lawrenceville, GA
F	35	Jonquel Jones	6 ft 4 in (1.93 m)	Sr	Riverdale Baptist	Freeport, Bahamas

Head coach

- Jonathan Tsipis (North Carolina)

Assistant coach(es)

- Diane Richardson (Frostburg State)
- Melissa Dunne (Temple)
- Zach Kancher (George Washington)

Legend

- (C) Team captain
- (S) Suspended
- (I) Ineligible
- (W) Walk-on
- Injured
- Current redshirt

Roster
Last update: 2015-10-30

== Schedule ==
Date time, TV	Rank^{#}	Opponent^{#}	Result	Record	Site (attendance) city, state
Exhibition
11/08/2015*; 12:00 pm	No. 21	Christopher Newport	W 95–47		Charles E. Smith Center (417); Washington, D.C.
Non-conference regular season
11/14/2015*; 2:00 pm	No. 21	Grambling State	W 85–58	1–0	Charles E. Smith Center (885); Washington, D.C.
11/17/2015*; 7:00 pm	No. 22	American	W 78–48	2–0	Charles E. Smith Center (785); Washington, D.C.
11/21/2015*; 3:00 pm	No. 22	at No. 15 Stanford	L 63–84	2–1	Maples Pavilion (2,854); Stanford, CA
11/23/2015*; 10:00 pm	No. 24	at Fresno State	W 61–53	3–1	Save Mart Center (2,237); Fresno, CA
11/26/2015*; 2:30 pm	No. 24	vs. Houston; Lone Star Showcase	W 82–78	4–1	Cedar Park Center (507); Cedar Park, TX
11/27/2015*; 2:30 pm	No. 24	vs. No. 25 Iowa; Lone Star Showcase	W 81–77 ^{2OT}	5–1	Cedar Park Center (627); Cedar Park, TX
11/28/2015*; 2:30 pm	No. 24	vs. Wright State; Lone Star Showcase	L 71–77	5–2	Cedar Park Center (527); Cedar Park, TX
12/03/2015*; 7:00 pm		Florida Gulf Coast	L 60–64	5–3	Charles E. Smith Center (875); Washington, D.C.
12/06/2015*; 2:00 pm		at Memphis	W 68–62	6–3	Elma Roane Fieldhouse (781); Memphis, TN
12/13/2015*; 2:00 pm		Villanova	W 78–70	7–3	Charles E. Smith Center (976); Washington, D.C.
12/20/2015*; 2:00 pm		Iona	W 70–65	8–3	Charles E. Smith Center (877); Washington, D.C.
12/28/2015*; 3:00 pm		at Illinois	W 70–57	9–3	State Farm Center (1,514); Champaign, IL
12/30/2015*; 7:00 pm		Hartford	W 82–51	10–3	Charles E. Smith Center (915); Washington, D.C.
Atlantic 10 regular season
01/03/2016; 3:00 pm, CBSSN		at Saint Joseph's	W 70–45	11–3 (1–0)	Hagan Arena (673); Philadelphia, PA
01/06/2016; 12:00 pm, NBCSN		Rhode Island	W 68–58	12–3 (2–0)	Charles E. Smith Center (1,989); Washington, D.C.
01/10/2016; 2:00 pm, CBSSN		at Dayton	W 62–61	13–3 (3–0)	UD Arena (2,331); Dayton, OH
01/13/2016; 7:00 pm		La Salle	W 83–59	14–3 (4–0)	Charles E. Smith Center (754); Washington, D.C.
01/17/2016; 12:00 pm, ESPNU		at Duquesne	W 70–52	15–3 (5–0)	Palumbo Center (1,203); Pittsburgh, PA
01/20/2016; 7:00 pm		Massachusetts	W 67–50	16–3 (6–0)	Charles E. Smith Center (565); Washington, D.C.
01/22/2016; 12:00 pm		George Mason	W 82–68	17–3 (7–0)	Charles E. Smith Center (502); Washington, D.C.
01/27/2016; 7:00 pm		at Davidson	W 79–60	18–3 (8–0)	John M. Belk Arena (411); Davidson, NC
01/31/2016; 2:00 pm		Saint Louis	W 89–80	19–3 (9–0)	Charles E. Smith Center (781); Washington, D.C.
02/03/2016; 7:00 pm		at Fordham	L 69–76	19–4 (9–1)	Rose Hill Gymnasium (851); Bronx, NY
02/07/2016; 2:00 pm		at Richmond	W 62–47	20–4 (10–1)	Robins Center (693); Richmond, VA
02/14/2016; 12:00 pm, ESPNU		Dayton	W 72–62	21–4 (11–1)	Charles E. Smith Center (2,102); Washington, D.C.
02/17/2016; 7:00 pm		at St. Bonaventure	L 67–69 ^{OT}	21–5 (11–2)	Reilly Center (897); Olean, NY
02/20/2016; 3:00 pm		VCU	L 68–79	21–6 (11–3)	Charles E. Smith Center (2,097); Washington, D.C.
02/24/2016; 7:00 pm		Richmond	W 55–53 ^{OT}	22–6 (12–3)	Charles E. Smith Center (789); Washington, D.C.
02/27/2016; 2:00 pm		at George Mason	W 73–66	23–6 (13–3)	EagleBank Arena (947); Fairfax, VA
Atlantic 10 Women's Tournament
03/04/2016; 11:30 am, ASN	(1)	vs. (9) George Mason; Quarterfinals	W 78–48	24–6	Richmond Coliseum; Richmond, VA
03/05/2016; 11:00 am, CBSSN	(1)	vs. (5) VCU; Semifinals	W 72–58	25–6	Richmond Coliseum; Richmond, VA
03/06/2016; 1:00 pm, ESPNU	(1)	vs. (3) Duquesne; Championship Game	W 63–60	26–6	Richmond Coliseum (2,673); Richmond, VA
NCAA Women's Tournament
03/18/2016*; 5:00 pm, ESPN2	(8 SF)	vs. (9 SF) Kansas State; First Round	L 51–56	26–7	Colonial Life Arena; Columbia, SC
*Non-conference game. ^{#}Rankings from AP Poll. (#) Tournament seedings in parentheses. SF=Sioux Falls Region. All times are in Eastern Time.

== Rankings ==
Regular season polls
Poll	Pre- Season	Week 2	Week 3	Week 4	Week 5	Week 6	Week 7	Week 8	Week 9	Week 10	Week 11	Week 12	Week 13	Week 14	Week 15	Week 16	Week 17	Week 18	Week 19	Final
AP	21	22	24	RV	NR	NR	NR	NR	NR	NR	RV	RV	RV	RV	NR	NR	NR	RV	RV	N/A
Coaches	21	20	23	RV	RV	RV	NR	NR	NR	RV	RV	RV	RV	RV	RV	NR	NR	NR	RV	RV

Legend
	Increase in ranking
	Decrease in ranking
	Not ranked previous week
(RV)	Received Votes

== See also ==
- 2015–16 George Washington Colonials men's basketball team
