= 2015–16 Richmond Spiders women's basketball team =

Intercollegiate basketball season

2015–16 Richmond Spiders women's basketball
- Conference: Atlantic 10 Conference
- Record: 13–18 (5–11 A-10)
- Head coach: Michael Shafer (11th season)
- Assistant coaches: Cori Chambers; Ebony Tanner Moore; John Miller
- Home arena: Robins Center

2015–16 Atlantic 10 women's basketball standings
	Conf.				Overall
Team	W		L	PCT	W		L	PCT
Duquesne	13	–	3	.813	28	–	6	.824
George Washington †	13	–	3	.813	26	–	7	.788
Saint Louis	13	–	3	.813	26	–	8	.765
St. Bonaventure	12	–	4	.750	24	–	8	.750
VCU	10	–	6	.625	23	–	10	.697
Saint Joseph's	8	–	8	.500	14	–	15	.483
Fordham	8	–	8	.500	14	–	17	.452
Dayton	7	–	9	.438	14	–	15	.483
George Mason	6	–	10	.375	12	–	19	.387
Richmond	5	–	11	.313	13	–	18	.419
Rhode Island	5	–	11	.313	12	–	18	.400
UMass	5	–	11	.313	12	–	18	.400
Davidson	5	–	11	.313	11	–	19	.367
La Salle	2	–	14	.125	5	–	25	.167
† 2016 A10 Tournament winner As of March 25, 2016; Rankings from AP poll

The 2015–16 Richmond Spiders women's basketball team represented the University of Richmond during the 2015–16 college basketball season. The Spiders, led by eleventh year head coach Michael Shafer, were members of the Atlantic 10 Conference and played their home games at the Robins Center. They finished the season 13–18, 5–11 in A-10 to finish a 4 way tie for tenth place. They advanced to the second round of the A-10 women's tournament, where they lost to VCU.

== 2015–16 media ==
All Spiders games are broadcast on WTVR 6.3 with Robert Fish on the call. The games are also streamed on Spider TV.

== Roster ==
2015–16 Richmond Spiders women's basketball team
Players
Coaches

Pos.	#	Name	Height	Year	Previous school	Hometown
G	0	Kylie Murphree	5 ft 9 in (1.75 m)	So	Fairfax	Fairfax, VA
G	1	Bria Powell (C)	5 ft 9 in (1.75 m)	Sr	Princess Anne	Virginia Beach, VA
G	2	Olivia Healy	5 ft 11 in (1.8 m)	Jr	Reading	Reading, PA
G	4	Janelle Hubbard (C)	5 ft 8 in (1.73 m)	Jr	Elizabeth Seton	Glenn Dale, MD
G	10	Dazia Hall	5 ft 9 in (1.75 m)	Jr	The Bullis School	Ashburn, VA
G	11	Micaela Parson	5 ft 7 in (1.7 m)	So	Monacan	North Chesterfield, VA
G	13	Taisha Murphy	5 ft 10 in (1.78 m)	Fr	Clayton	Clayton, NC
F	14	Alicia Hudalla	6 ft 1 in (1.85 m)	So	Glen Allen	Glen Allen, VA
F/C	15	Karleigh Wike	6 ft 4 in (1.93 m)	So	East Rowan	Salisbury, NC
F	21	Salita Greene	5 ft 11 in (1.8 m)	Fr	Jordan	Durham, NC
G	23	Lauren Tolson (C)	5 ft 8 in (1.73 m)	Sr	Frederick	Frederick, MD
F	24	Tuuli Menna	6 ft 1 in (1.85 m)	Fr	Mäkelänrintee	Helsinki, Finland
F/C	32	Rennie Harrison	6 ft 4 in (1.93 m)	RS Fr	Episcopal	Silver Spring, MD

Head coach

- Michael Shafer (William & Mary)

Assistant coach(es)

- Ebony Tanner Moore (Richmond)
- Cori Chambers (Georgia)
- John Miller (Mount St. Mary's)

Legend

- (C) Team captain
- (S) Suspended
- (I) Ineligible
- (W) Walk-on
- Injured
- Current redshirt

Roster

== Schedule ==
Date time, TV	Rank^{#}	Opponent^{#}	Result	Record	Site (attendance) city, state
Non-conference regular season
11/13/2015*; 3:00 pm		Old Dominion	W 62–57	1–0	Robins Center (973); Richmond, VA
11/15/2015*; 1:00 pm		Eastern Kentucky	W 81–62	2–0	Robins Center (647); Richmond, VA
11/20/2015*; 7:00 pm		William & Mary	W 56–50	3–0	Robins Center (879); Richmond, VA
11/23/2015*; 7:00 pm		UNC Wilmington	W 63–53	4–0	Robins Center (745); Richmond, VA
11/27/2015*; 2:00 pm		vs. Wichita State; FIU Turkey Slam semifinals	W 63–50	5–0	FIU Arena; Miami, FL
11/29/2015*; 12:00 pm		vs. Marquette; FIU Turkey Slam championship	L 80–98	5–1	FIU Arena; Miami, FL
12/01/2015*; 5:00 pm		Furman	L 62–69	5–2	Robins Center (650); Richmond, VA
12/05/2015*; 1:00 pm		at Providence	W 57–50	6–2	Alumni Hall (233); Providence, RI
12/13/2015*; 2:00 pm		James Madison	L 47–73	6–3	Robins Center (1,015); Richmond, VA
12/17/2015*; 7:00 pm		at Appalachian State	L 59–73	6–4	Holmes Center (227); Boone, NC
12/20/2015*; 2:00 pm		at Wake Forest	L 33–43	6–5	LJVM Coliseum (584); Winston-Salem, NC
12/28/2015*; 4:30 pm		vs. Lafayette; Cavalier Classic Tournament	W 54–46	7–5	John Paul Jones Arena (473); Charlottesville, VA
12/29/2015*; 4:30 pm		at Virginia; Cavalier Classic Tournament	L 51–71	7–6	John Paul Jones Arena (3,190); Charlottesville, VA
Atlantic 10 regular Season
01/02/2016; 11:00 am, CBSSN		at La Salle	W 60–43	8–6 (1–0)	Tom Gola Arena (642); Philadelphia, PA
01/06/2016; 7:00 pm		Dayton	L 48–60	8–7 (1–1)	Robins Center (603); Richmond, VA
01/09/2016; 2:00 pm		Rhode Island	L 50–57	8–8 (1–2)	Robins Center (994); Richmond, VA
01/13/2016; 7:00 pm		at Saint Joseph's	L 53–64	8–9 (1–3)	Hagan Arena (323); Philadelphia, PA
01/16/2016; 7:00 pm		at Massachusetts	W 74–68	9–9 (2–3)	Mullins Center (255); Amherst, MA
01/25/2016; 7:00 pm		VCU	L 42–53	9–10 (2–4)	Robins Center (639); Richmond, VA
01/28/2016; 7:00 pm		Duquesne	L 44–65	9–11 (2–5)	Robins Center (759); Richmond, VA
01/31/2016; 12:00 pm, ASN		at St. Bonaventure	L 43–66	9–12 (2–6)	Reilly Center (2,011); Olean, NY
02/03/2016; 12:00 pm		at Saint Louis	L 48–73	9–13 (2–7)	Chaifetz Arena (4,011); St. Louis, MO
02/07/2016; 2:00 pm		George Washington	L 47–62	9–14 (2–8)	Robins Center (693); Richmond, VA
02/10/2016; 7:00 pm		Davidson	L 59–67	9–15 (2–9)	Robins Center (1,204); Richmond, VA
02/14/2016; 1:00 pm		at VCU	W 62–50	10–15 (3–9)	Siegel Center (1,303); Richmond, VA
02/17/2016; 7:00 pm		Fordham	W 52–48	11–15 (4–9)	Robins Center (574); Richmond, VA
02/20/2016; 2:00 pm		at George Mason	W 57–50	12–15 (5–9)	EagleBank Arena (922); Fairfax, VA
02/24/2016; 7:00 pm		at George Washington	L 53–55 ^{OT}	12–16 (5–10)	Charles E. Smith Center (789); Washington, D.C.
02/27/2016; 2:00 pm		Saint Joseph's	L 57–59	12–17 (5–11)	Robins Center (1,107); Richmond, VA
Atlantic 10 Tournament
03/02/2016; 4:30 pm		vs. Davidson; First Round	W 70–51	13–17	Richmond Coliseum; Richmond, VA
03/03/2016; 2:00 pm		vs. VCU; Second Round	L 42–62	13–18	Richmond Coliseum; Richmond, VA
*Non-conference game. ^{#}Rankings from AP Poll. (#) Tournament seedings in parentheses. All times are in Eastern Time.

== Rankings ==
2015–16 NCAA Division I women's basketball rankings

Regular season polls
Poll	Pre- Season	Week 2	Week 3	Week 4	Week 5	Week 6	Week 7	Week 8	Week 9	Week 10	Week 11	Week 12	Week 13	Week 14	Week 15	Week 16	Week 17	Week 18	Final
AP																			
Coaches																			

Legend
	Increase in ranking
	Decrease in ranking
	No change
(RV)	Received votes
(NR)	Not ranked

== See also ==
- 2015–16 Richmond Spiders men's basketball team
