= Lisa Stone =

American college basketball coach

Current position
- Title: Head Coach
- Team: WashU
- Conference: UAA
- Record: 37–16 (.698)

Biographical details
- Born: August 14, 1962 (age 64); Madison, Wisconsin, U.S.

Playing career
- 1980–1984: Iowa
- Position: Point guard

Coaching career (HC unless noted)
- 1985–1988: Cornell College
- 1988–2000: Wisconsin–Eau Claire
- 2000–2003: Drake
- 2003–2011: Wisconsin
- 2012–2022: Saint Louis
- 2024–Present: WashU

Head coaching record
- Overall: 704–391 (.643)
- Tournaments: 2–3 (NCAA D-I); 26–11 (NCAA D-III); 8–8 (WNIT)

Accomplishments and honors

Championships
- 3× Midwest Southern Division (1986–88); 8× WIAC regular season (1990, 1992–1993, 1995, 1997–2000); WIAC Tournament (2000); MVC regular season (2001); A-10 regular season (2016)

Awards
- 5× WIAC Coach of the Year (1989, 1990, 1993, 1995, 2000); WBCA Division III Coach of the Year (1997); D3 News/Molten Division III Coach of the Year (2000); MVC Coach of the Year (2001); Big Ten Coach of the Year (2010); A-10 Coach of the Year (2016)

Lisa Lea Stone (née Anderson; born August 14, 1962) is an American college basketball coach who was previously the head women's basketball coach at Saint Louis University.

== Early life and education ==
Born Lisa Lea Anderson in Madison, Wisconsin and raised in the nearby town of Oregon, Stone earned lettered in tennis, basketball, and track at Oregon High School. Helping Oregon qualify for the Wisconsin state basketball tournament in both years, Stone earned second-team all-state honors as a junior in 1979 and first-team honors as a senior in 1980.

She played college basketball at the University of Iowa from 1980 to 1984 under future Hall of Famer C. Vivian Stringer. Playing at point guard, Stone had 1,129 points, 332 assists, and 177 steals in her career. She won the 1984 Big Ten Medal of Honor for combined athletic and academic achievement. Stone earned a bachelor's degree in 1984 and a master's degree in athletic administration from Iowa in 1986.

== Coaching career ==
=== Cornell College (1985–1988) ===
Stone began her coaching career in 1985 as head coach of Cornell College, a Division III college in Mt. Vernon, Iowa. Entering her job as the youngest four-year coach in the U.S., Stone compiled a 34–32 record in three seasons and led the Rams to three consecutive Southern Division titles in the Midwest Conference.

=== Wisconsin–Eau Claire (1988–2000) ===
From 1988 to 2000, Stone was head coach at the University of Wisconsin-Eau Claire. Inheriting a program that had only one winning season in history, Stone compiled a 277–59 (.824) record in 12 seasons at Eau Claire, which ranks second all-time for most wins in the league's history. Her teams had 20-win seasons and NCAA Tournament appearances in every year except 1990–91.

In 1997, Stone led the Blugolds to the NCAA Division III national championship game, losing to New York University. Stone earned five Wisconsin Intercollegiate Athletic Conference Coach of the Year honors (1989, 1990, 1993, 1995, and 2000) and two Division III National Coach of the Year awards, from the Women's Basketball Coaches Association in 1997 and Molten Corporation in 2000.

=== Drake (2000–2003) ===
On May 1, 2000, Drake University in Des Moines, Iowa hired Stone as its head women's basketball coach. Drake went 64–27 in Stone's three seasons as head coach with two NCAA Tournament appearances, including a run to the Sweet 16 in 2002, and the 2001 Missouri Valley Conference (MVC) regular season title. Stone was the MVC Coach of the Year in 2001.

=== Wisconsin (2003–2011) ===
Returning home to the Madison, Wisconsin area, Stone became head coach at Wisconsin on March 31, 2003. Stone inherited a program that went 7–21 the previous season. Wisconsin went 10–17 in Stone's first season. Reaching a program record number of wins in 2006–07, Wisconsin went 23–13 and made the WNIT championship game. The team featured All-American guard and future WNBA draft pick Jolene Anderson.

After two more WNIT appearances in 2008 and 2009, Wisconsin had another 20-win season in 2009–10, with a 21–11 record and first appearance in the NCAA tournament in Stone's tenure. Stone won Big Ten Coach of the Year honors following the season.

Wisconsin fired Stone on March 21, 2011, following a 16–15 season and WNIT appearance. Stone finished her eight-year tenure with a 128–119 record at Wisconsin. Athletic director Barry Alvarez explained the firing: "On the court...our women’s basketball program has not reached and maintained the level of success I believe is possible."

=== Saint Louis (2012–2022) ===
Stone was hired as head women's basketball coach at Saint Louis University on May 4, 2012. Inheriting a program that had nine straight losing seasons, Stone led Saint Louis to a 26–8 record, the program's first Atlantic 10 Conference (A-10) regular season title, and a third round WNIT appearance by her fourth season. That season also had Saint Louis' first-ever All-American player in Jackie Kemph. Stone won A-10 Coach of the Year and College Sports Madness High Major Coach of the Year honors after that season. In 2016–17, Saint Louis had another successful season, with a 25–9 record and second-round WNIT appearance. Her contract was not renewed in 2022.

=== Washington University in St. Louis (2024–) ===
Stone was announced as head women's basketball coach at NCAA Division III Washington University in St. Louis on August 22, 2024.

== Personal life ==
Stone is married to Ed Stone; they have two children.

== Head coaching record ==
Source for Cornell College:

Sources for Wisconsin–Eau Claire:

Source for Drake:

Source for Wisconsin:

Source for Saint Louis:

Source for Washington University:

Record table
Season	Team	Overall	Conference	Standing	Postseason
Cornell College Rams (Midwest Conference) (1985–1988)
1985–86	Cornell College	11–11	8–2	1st (Southern)	
1986–87	Cornell College	12–10	8–2	1st (Southern)	
1987–88	Cornell College	11–11	8–2	1st (Southern)	
Cornell College:		34–32 (.515)	24–6 (.800)		
Wisconsin–Eau Claire Blugolds (Wisconsin Intercollegiate Athletic Conference) (1988–2000)
1988–89	Wisconsin–Eau Claire	24–4	13–3	2nd	NCAA Division III Elite Eight
1989–90	Wisconsin–Eau Claire	21–6	14–2	1st	NCAA Division III Regional
1990–91	Wisconsin–Eau Claire	15–10	9–7	T–4th	
1991–92	Wisconsin–Eau Claire	23–5	13–3	T–1st	NCAA Division III Elite Eight
1992–93	Wisconsin–Eau Claire	22–4	14–2	1st	NCAA Division III Sweet Sixteen
1993–94	Wisconsin–Eau Claire	23–6	13–3	T–2nd	NCAA Division III Third Place
1994–95	Wisconsin–Eau Claire	24–5	14–2	T–1st	NCAA Division III Elite Eight
1995–96	Wisconsin–Eau Claire	25–4	14–2	2nd	NCAA Division III Elite Eight
1996–97	Wisconsin–Eau Claire	27–4	14–2	T–1st	NCAA Division III Runner-Up
1997–98	Wisconsin–Eau Claire	26–2	16–0	1st	NCAA D-III Regional
1998–99	Wisconsin–Eau Claire	27–2	15–1	1st	NCAA D-III Regional
1999–2000	Wisconsin–Eau Claire	28–1	16–0	1st	NCAA D-III Sweet Sixteen
Wisconsin-Eau Claire:		277–59 (.824)	165–27 (.859)		
Drake Bulldogs (Missouri Valley Conference) (2000–2003)
2000–01	Drake	23–7	16–2	T–1st	NCAA Division I first round
2001–02	Drake	25–8	15–3	2nd	NCAA Division I Sweet Sixteen
2002–03	Drake	16–12	11–7	4th	
Drake:		64–27 (.703)	42–12 (.778)		
Wisconsin Badgers (Big Ten Conference) (2003–2011)
2003–04	Wisconsin	10–17	4–12	T–8th	
2004–05	Wisconsin	12–16	5–11	8th	
2005–06	Wisconsin	11–18	5–11	9th	
2006–07	Wisconsin	23–13	7–9	T–5th	WNIT Runner-Up
2007–08	Wisconsin	16–14	9–9	T–7th	WNIT First Round
2008–09	Wisconsin	19–15	6–12	T–7th	WNIT Third Round
2009–10	Wisconsin	21–11	10–8	T–3rd	NCAA Division I first round
2010–11	Wisconsin	16–15	10–6	T–3rd	WNIT First Round
Wisconsin:		128–119 (.518)	56–78 (.418)		
Saint Louis Billikens (Atlantic 10 Conference) (2012–2022)
2012–13	Saint Louis	12–19	5–9	T–10th	
2013–14	Saint Louis	12–18	7–9	10th	
2014–15	Saint Louis	15–16	7–9	T–8th	
2015–16	Saint Louis	26–8	13–3	T–1st	WNIT Second Round
2016–17	Saint Louis	25–9	12–4	T–3rd	WNIT Second Round
2017–18	Saint Louis	17–16	9–7	7th	WNIT First Round
2018–19	Saint Louis	15–16	9–7	6th	
2019–20	Saint Louis	19–13	9–7	T–4th	Postseason not held due to COVID-19
2020–21	Saint Louis	14–5	9–3	3rd	WNIT Quarterfinals
2021–22	Saint Louis	9–18	5–9	11th	
Saint Louis:		164–138 (.543)	85–67 (.559)		
Washington University Bears (University Athletic Association) (2024–present)
2024–25	Washington University	16–9	7–7	T–3rd	
2025–26	Washington University	21–7	10–4	2nd	NCAA D-III Sweet Sixteen
Washington University:		37–16 (.698)	17–11 (.607)		
Total:		704–391 (.643)			
National champion Postseason invitational champion Conference regular season champion Conference regular season and conference tournament champion Division regular season champion Division regular season and conference tournament champion Conference tournament champion

== See also ==
- List of college women's basketball career coaching wins leaders
