= 2015–16 Fordham Rams women's basketball team =

Intercollegiate basketball season

2015–16 Fordham Rams women's basketball
- Conference: Atlantic 10 Conference
- Record: 14–17 (8–8 A-10)
- Head coach: Stephanie Gaitley (5th season)
- Assistant coaches: Angelika Szumilo; Jenna Cosgrove; Katelyn Linney
- Home arena: Rose Hill Gymnasium

2015–16 Atlantic 10 women's basketball standings
	Conf.				Overall
Team	W		L	PCT	W		L	PCT
Duquesne	13	–	3	.813	28	–	6	.824
George Washington †	13	–	3	.813	26	–	7	.788
Saint Louis	13	–	3	.813	26	–	8	.765
St. Bonaventure	12	–	4	.750	24	–	8	.750
VCU	10	–	6	.625	23	–	10	.697
Saint Joseph's	8	–	8	.500	14	–	15	.483
Fordham	8	–	8	.500	14	–	17	.452
Dayton	7	–	9	.438	14	–	15	.483
George Mason	6	–	10	.375	12	–	19	.387
Richmond	5	–	11	.313	13	–	18	.419
Rhode Island	5	–	11	.313	12	–	18	.400
UMass	5	–	11	.313	12	–	18	.400
Davidson	5	–	11	.313	11	–	19	.367
La Salle	2	–	14	.125	5	–	25	.167
† 2016 A10 Tournament winner As of March 25, 2016; Rankings from AP poll

The 2015–16 Fordham Rams women's basketball team represented Fordham University during the 2015–16 NCAA Division I women's basketball season. The Rams were led by fifth-year head coach Stephanie Gaitley. They were members of the Atlantic 10 Conference and played their home games at the Rose Hill Gymnasium. They finished the season 14–17, 8–8 in A-10 play to finish in a tie for sixth place. They advanced to the quarterfinals of the A-10 women's tournament where they lost to Duquesne.

== 2015–16 media ==
=== Fordham Rams Sports Network ===
Fordham Rams games will be broadcast on WFUV Sports and streamed online through the Fordham Portal. Most home games will also be featured on the A-10 Digital Network. Select games will be televised.

== Roster ==
2015–16 Fordham Rams women's basketball team
Players
Coaches

Pos.	#	Name	Height	Year	Previous school	Hometown
G	1	Aaliyah Jones	5 ft 7 in (1.7 m)	So	Murray Bergtraum	Brooklyn, NY
G	2	Lauren Holden	5 ft 5 in (1.65 m)	Fr	Lower Cape May Regional	Cape May, NJ
G	3	Tiffany Suarez (I) (redshirt)	5 ft 11 in (1.8 m)	Jr	Our Lady of Lourdes; Virginia	Miami, FL
F	5	G'mrice Davis	6 ft 2 in (1.88 m)	Fr	Girard College	Philadelphia, PA
G	10	Asnate Fomina	5 ft 8 in (1.73 m)	So	Riga Secondary School No. 49	Riga, Latvia
G	11	Alexia Douglas	5 ft 7 in (1.7 m)	Fr	Brentwood	Bay Shore, NY
G/F	12	Britt Zappeij	6 ft 1 in (1.85 m)	So	CTO Amsterdam	Tiel, Netherlands
F	14	Danielle Padovano	6 ft 0 in (1.83 m)	Jr	South Brunswick	Dayton, NJ
G/F	22	Danielle Burns	5 ft 10 in (1.78 m)	Jr	Stonewall Jackson	Gainesville, VA
G	23	Khadijah Gibson	5 ft 8 in (1.73 m)	Sr	Henry Wise	Upper Marlboro, MD
F	24	Samantha Clark	6 ft 2 in (1.88 m)	Sr	St. Rose	Neptune, NJ
G	25	Hannah Missry	5 ft 8 in (1.73 m)	Jr	Jackson Memorial	Jackson, NJ
F	35	Kate Krēsliņa	6 ft 0 in (1.83 m)	Fr	XXXX	Riga, Latvia
F	40	Nicole Floyd (I) (redshirt)	6 ft 2 in (1.88 m)	So	Stonewall Jackson; Wake Forest	Manassas, VA
F	42	Kristen Ryan	6 ft 1 in (1.85 m)	Fr	Archbishop John Carroll	Malvern, PA
F	52	Alex Parlato	6 ft 3 in (1.91 m)	Fr	Wantagh	Wantagh, NY

Head coach

- Stephanie Gaitley (Villanova)

Assistant coach(es)

- Angelika Szumilo (LIU Brooklyn)
- Jenna Cosgrove (Endicott)
- Katelyn Linney (Fairfield)

Legend

- (C) Team captain
- (S) Suspended
- (I) Ineligible
- (W) Walk-on
- Injured
- Current redshirt

Roster
Last update: 2015-10-31

== Schedule ==
Date time, TV	Rank^{#}	Opponent^{#}	Result	Record	Site (attendance) city, state
Exhibition
11/08/2015*; 2:00 pm		Caldwell	W 88–59		Rose Hill Gymnasium (247); Bronx, NY
Non-conference regular season
11/15/2015*; 2:00 pm		at Penn State	L 59–75	0–1	Bryce Jordan Center (3,024); University Park, PA
11/18/2015*; 7:00 pm		at Manhattan; Battle of the Bronx	W 60–49	1–1	Draddy Gymnasium (328); Riverdale, NY
11/24/2015*; 6:00 pm		Lafayette	W 61–49	2–1	Rose Hill Gymnasium; Bronx, NY
11/27/2015*; 7:30 pm		vs. Texas Tech; South Point Thanksgiving Shootout	L 48–62	2–2	South Point Arena; Enterprise, NV
11/28/2015*; 7:30 pm		vs. No. 23 Syracuse; South Point Thanksgiving Shootout	L 54–76	2–3	South Point Arena; Enterprise, NV
12/03/2015*; 7:00 pm		Delaware	L 48–55	2–4	Rose Hill Gymnasium (540); Bronx, NY
12/05/2015*; 2:00 pm		Delaware State	W 74–58	3–4	Rose Hill Gymnasium; Bronx, NY
12/09/2015*; 7:00 pm		at Seton Hall	L 54–66	3–5	Walsh Gymnasium (1,002); South Orange, NJ
12/12/2015*; 2:00 pm		Temple	L 44–57	3–6	Rose Hill Gymnasium (452); Bronx, NY
12/14/2015*; 7:00 pm		at Princeton	L 44–55	3–7	Jadwin Gymnasium (559); Princeton, NJ
12/20/2015*; 2:00 pm		Central Connecticut	W 63–48	4–7	Rose Hill Gymnasium (351); Bronx, NY
12/29/2015*; 1:00 pm		Texas A&M–Corpus Christi; Fordham Holiday Classic semifinals	W 67–49	5–7	Rose Hill Gymnasium; Bronx, NY
12/30/2015*; 3:30 pm		Vanderbilt; Fordham Holiday Classic championship	L 40–53	5–8	Rose Hill Gymnasium (622); Bronx, NY
A-10 regular season
01/02/2016; 2:00 pm		Davidson	W 51–40	6–8 (1–0)	Rose Hill Gymnasium (334); Bronx, NY
01/07/2016; 7:00 pm		at St. Bonaventure	L 41–55	6–9 (1–1)	Reilly Center (1,344); Olean, NY
01/10/2016; 12:00 pm, CBSSN		at Duquesne	L 40–55	6–10 (1–2)	Palumbo Center (704); Pittsburgh, PA
01/13/2016; 12:00 pm		George Mason	W 66–54	7–10 (2–2)	Rose Hill Gymnasium (2,410); Bronx, NY
01/17/2016; 4:00 pm, CBSSN		Saint Joseph's	W 47–40	8–10 (3–2)	Rose Hill Gymnasium (1,215); Bronx, NY
01/20/2016; 7:00 pm		at Davidson	L 51–69	8–11 (3–3)	John M. Belk Arena (443); Davidson, NC
01/27/2016; 7:00 pm		at VCU	L 51–61	8–12 (3–4)	Siegel Center (524); Richmond, VA
01/30/2016; 2:00 pm		Rhode Island	W 50–42	9–12 (4–4)	Rose Hill Gymnasium (494); Bronx, NY
02/03/2016; 7:00 pm		George Washington	W 76–69	10–12 (5–4)	Rose Hill Gymnasium (851); Bronx, NY
02/06/2016; 2:00 pm		at Massachusetts	W 60–55	11–12 (6–4)	Mullins Center (211); Amherst, MA
02/10/2016; 4:00 pm		at Saint Joseph's	L 51–61	11–13 (6–5)	Hagan Arena (910); Philadelphia, PA
02/13/2016; 2:00 pm		La Salle	W 54–44	12–13 (7–5)	Rose Hill Gymnasium (1,018); Bronx, NY
02/17/2016; 7:00 pm		at Richmond	L 48–52	12–14 (7–6)	Robins Center (574); Richmond, VA
02/21/2016; 2:00 pm		Saint Louis	L 49–51	12–15 (7–7)	Rose Hill Gymnasium (522); Bronx, NY
02/24/2016; 7:00 pm		St. Bonaventure	W 77–68	13–15 (8–7)	Rose Hill Gymnasium (785); Bronx, NY
02/28/2016; 5:00 pm, ASN		at Dayton	L 55–77	13–16 (8–8)	UD Arena (2,883); Dayton, OH
Atlantic 10 Women's Tournament
03/03/2016; 7:00 pm		vs. Massachusetts; Second Round	W 74–63 ^{OT}	14–16	Richmond Coliseum; Richmond, VA
03/04/2016; 7:00 pm, ASN		vs. Duquesne; Quarterfinals	L 65–70	14–17	Richmond Coliseum (2,041); Richmond, VA
*Non-conference game. ^{#}Rankings from AP Poll. (#) Tournament seedings in parentheses. All times are in Eastern Time.

== Rankings ==
Regular season polls
Poll	Pre- Season	Week 2	Week 3	Week 4	Week 5	Week 6	Week 7	Week 8	Week 9	Week 10	Week 11	Week 12	Week 13	Week 14	Week 15	Week 16	Week 17	Week 18	Final
AP																			
Coaches																			

Legend
	Increase in ranking
	Decrease in ranking
	Not ranked previous week
(RV)	Received Votes

== See also ==
- 2015–16 Fordham Rams men's basketball team
