= 2015–16 Dayton Flyers women's basketball team =

Intercollegiate basketball season

2015–16 Dayton Flyers women's basketball

WNIT, First Round
- Conference: Atlantic 10 Conference
- Record: 14–15 (7–9 A-10)
- Head coach: Jim Jabir (13th season)
- Assistant coaches: Simon Harris; Jeff House; Kayla Ard
- Home arena: University of Dayton Arena

2015–16 Atlantic 10 women's basketball standings
	Conf.				Overall
Team	W		L	PCT	W		L	PCT
Duquesne	13	–	3	.813	28	–	6	.824
George Washington †	13	–	3	.813	26	–	7	.788
Saint Louis	13	–	3	.813	26	–	8	.765
St. Bonaventure	12	–	4	.750	24	–	8	.750
VCU	10	–	6	.625	23	–	10	.697
Saint Joseph's	8	–	8	.500	14	–	15	.483
Fordham	8	–	8	.500	14	–	17	.452
Dayton	7	–	9	.438	14	–	15	.483
George Mason	6	–	10	.375	12	–	19	.387
Richmond	5	–	11	.313	13	–	18	.419
Rhode Island	5	–	11	.313	12	–	18	.400
UMass	5	–	11	.313	12	–	18	.400
Davidson	5	–	11	.313	11	–	19	.367
La Salle	2	–	14	.125	5	–	25	.167
† 2016 A10 Tournament winner As of March 25, 2016; Rankings from AP poll

The 2015–16 Dayton Flyers women's basketball team represented the University of Dayton during the 2015–16 college basketball season. The Flyers, led by thirteenth year head coach Jim Jabir, were members of the Atlantic 10 Conference and played their home games at the University of Dayton Arena. They finished the season 14–15, 7–9 in A-10 play to finish in eighth place. They lost in the second round of the A-10 women's tournament to George Mason. They were invited to the Women's National Invitation Tournament, where they lost to WKU in the first round.

== 2015–16 media ==
=== Dayton Flyers Sports Network ===
The Dayton Flyers Sports Network will broadcast Flyers games off of their athletic website, DaytonFlyers.com, with Shane White on the call. Most home games will also be featured on the A-10 Digital Network. Select games will be televised.

== Roster ==
2015–16 Dayton Flyers women's basketball team
Players
Coaches

Pos.	#	Name	Height	Year	Previous school	Hometown
G	2	Amber Deane	5 ft 9 in (1.75 m)	Sr	Detroit Country Day	Lathrup Village, MI
G	3	Christy Macioce	6 ft 0 in (1.83 m)	Jr	Pickerington North	Pickerington, OH
G	5	Celeste Edwards	5 ft 9 in (1.75 m)	Jr	North Central	Indianapolis, IN
F	10	Andrijana Cvitkovic	6 ft 3 in (1.91 m)	Jr	Culver Girls Academy	Kraljevica, Croatia
F	11	Alex Harris (I) (redshirt)	6 ft 3 in (1.91 m)	Jr	Lorain; Penn State	Lorain, OH
C	12	Jodie Cornelie-Sigmundova	6 ft 4 in (1.93 m)	Sr	Oak Hill Academy	Strasbourg, France
G	14	Jenna Burdette	5 ft 8 in (1.73 m)	So	Reedsville Eastern	Coolville, OH
G	22	Kelley Austria	6 ft 0 in (1.83 m)	Sr	Carroll	Beavercreek, OH
F	23	Maddy Dennis	6 ft 2 in (1.88 m)	Fr	Mount Lawley	Perth, Australia
G	24	Lauren Cannatelli	5 ft 8 in (1.73 m)	Fr	Lakota West	Cincinnati, OH
G/F	25	Madeline Blais	6 ft 1 in (1.85 m)	RS Jr	New Hampton School; Marist	Exeter, NH
G/F	30	Ashleigh Parksinson	6 ft 2 in (1.88 m)	Fr	Newark Catholic	Newark, OH
F	33	Abby Duffy	6 ft 0 in (1.83 m)	Fr	Jackson	Massillon, OH
C	55	Saicha Grant-Allen	6 ft 5 in (1.96 m)	Jr	Glendale Secondary	Hamilton, ON

Head coach

- Jim Jabir (Nazareth)

Assistant coach(es)

- Simon Harris (NC State)
- Jeff House (Nazareth)
- Kayla Ard (Southeastern Louisiana)

Legend

- (C) Team captain
- (S) Suspended
- (I) Ineligible
- (W) Walk-on
- Injured
- Current redshirt

Roster
Last update: 2015-10-29

== Schedule ==
Date time, TV	Rank^{#}	Opponent^{#}	Result	Record	Site (attendance) city, state
Exhibition
11/06/2015*; 7:00 pm		Gannon	W 109–67		UD Arena; Dayton, OH
Non-conference regular season
11/13/2015*; 11:00 am		Yale	W 81–75	1–0	UD Arena (10,159); Dayton, OH
11/18/2015*; 7:00 pm		Vanderbilt	W 81–56	2–0	UD Arena (1,637); Dayton, OH
11/22/2015*; 2:00 pm		Wisconsin	W 87–64	3–0	UD Arena (2,097); Dayton, OH
11/27/2015*; 11:00 am		vs. Maine; Gulf Coast Showcase quarterfinals	W 58–37	4–0	Germain Arena; Estero, FL
11/28/2015*; 5:00 pm		vs. No. 13 Stanford; Gulf Coast Showcase semifinals	L 66–74	4–1	Germain Arena (1,407); Estero, FL
11/29/2015*; 5:00 pm		vs. No. 22 Louisville; Gulf Coast Showcase 3rd place game	W 79–66	5–1	Germain Arena; Estero, FL
12/02/2015*; 11:00 am, ESPN3		at Toledo	W 83–57	6–1	Savage Arena (4,459); Toledo, OH
12/06/2015*; 2:00 pm		at Purdue	L 58–61	6–2	Mackey Arena (5,830); West Lafayette, IN
12/11/2015*; 7:00 pm, TWCSC		Gonzaga	L 47–57	6–3	UD Arena (2,533); Dayton, OH
12/20/2015*; 2:00 pm		Princeton	W 85–81	7–3	UD Arena (2,385); Dayton, OH
12/30/2015*; 8:00 pm, ESPN3		at Green Bay	L 52–68	7–4	Kress Events Center (2,533); Green Bay, WI
Atlantic 10 regular season
01/03/2016; 1:00 pm, CBSSN		at Duquesne	L 58–89	7–5 (0–1)	Palumbo Center (762); Pittsburgh, PA
01/06/2016; 7:00 pm		at Richmond	W 60–48	8–5 (1–1)	Robins Center (603); Richmond, VA
01/10/2016; 2:00 pm, CBSSN		George Washington	L 61–62	8–6 (1–2)	UD Arena (2,331); Dayton, OH
01/13/2016; 7:00 pm, TWCSC		VCU	L 72–74	8–7 (1–3)	UD Arena (2,005); Dayton, OH
01/16/2016; 8:00 pm		at Saint Louis	L 56–70	8–8 (1–4)	Chaifetz Arena (9,985); St. Louis, MO
01/20/2016; 7:00 pm, TWCSC		St. Bonaventure	L 54–59	8–9 (1–5)	UD Arena (2,514); Dayton, OH
01/24/2016; 5:00 pm, CBSSN		at Saint Joseph's	W 71–61	9–9 (2–5)	Hagan Arena (224); Philadelphia, PA
01/27/2016; 7:00 pm		at La Salle	W 67–51	10–9 (3–5)	Tom Gola Arena (471); Philadelphia, PA
01/31/2016; 2:00 pm, TWCSC		Davidson	W 77–66	11–9 (4–5)	UD Arena (2,988); Dayton, OH
02/07/2016; 2:00 pm		at Rhode Island	W 67–53	12–9 (5–5)	Ryan Center (417); Kingston, RI
02/10/2016; 7:00 pm		George Mason	W 81–58	13–9 (6–5)	UD Arena (1,647); Dayton, OH
02/14/2016; 12:00 pm, ESPNU		at George Washington	L 62–72	13–10 (6–6)	Charles E. Smith Center (2,102); Washington, D.C.
02/17/2016; 7:00 pm		at Massachusetts	L 69–76	13–11 (6–7)	Mullins Center (461); Amherst, MA
02/21/2016; 1:00 pm, ASN		Duquesne	L 72–76 ^{OT}	13–12 (6–8)	UD Arena (2,698); Dayton, OH
02/24/2016; 7:00 pm, TWCSC		Saint Louis	L 52–55	13–13 (6–9)	UD Arena (1,689); Dayton, OH
02/28/2016; 5:00 pm, ASN		Fordham	W 77–55	14–13 (7–9)	UD Arena (2,883); Dayton, OH
Atlantic 10 Women's Tournament
03/03/2016; 11:30 am		vs. George Mason; Second Round	L 62–66	14–14	Richmond Coliseum; Richmond, VA
WNIT
03/17/2016*; 8:00 pm		at WKU; First Round	L 72–89	14–15	E. A. Diddle Arena (1,066); Bowling Green, KY
*Non-conference game. ^{#}Rankings from AP Poll. (#) Tournament seedings in parentheses. All times are in Eastern Time.

== Rankings ==
Regular season polls
Poll	Pre- Season	Week 2	Week 3	Week 4	Week 5	Week 6	Week 7	Week 8	Week 9	Week 10	Week 11	Week 12	Week 13	Week 14	Week 15	Week 16	Week 17	Week 18	Week 19	Final
AP	RV	RV	RV	RV	NR	NR	NR	NR	NR	NR	NR	NR	NR	NR	NR	NR	NR	NR	NR	N/A
Coaches	RV	RV	RV	RV	RV	RV	RV	NR	NR	NR	NR	NR	NR	NR	NR	NR	NR	NR	NR	NR

Legend
	Increase in ranking
	Decrease in ranking
	Not ranked previous week
(RV)	Received Votes

== See also ==
- 2015–16 Dayton Flyers men's basketball team
