= 2015–16 UMass Minutewomen basketball team =

Intercollegiate basketball season

2015–16 UMass Minutewomen basketball
- Conference: Atlantic 10 Conference
- Record: 12–18 (5–11 A-10)
- Head coach: Sharon Dawley (6th season)
- Assistant coaches: Jen MacAulay; Yolanda Griffith; Chris Wielgus
- Home arena: William D. Mullins Memorial Center

2015–16 Atlantic 10 women's basketball standings
	Conf.				Overall
Team	W		L	PCT	W		L	PCT
Duquesne	13	–	3	.813	28	–	6	.824
George Washington †	13	–	3	.813	26	–	7	.788
Saint Louis	13	–	3	.813	26	–	8	.765
St. Bonaventure	12	–	4	.750	24	–	8	.750
VCU	10	–	6	.625	23	–	10	.697
Saint Joseph's	8	–	8	.500	14	–	15	.483
Fordham	8	–	8	.500	14	–	17	.452
Dayton	7	–	9	.438	14	–	15	.483
George Mason	6	–	10	.375	12	–	19	.387
Richmond	5	–	11	.313	13	–	18	.419
Rhode Island	5	–	11	.313	12	–	18	.400
UMass	5	–	11	.313	12	–	18	.400
Davidson	5	–	11	.313	11	–	19	.367
La Salle	2	–	14	.125	5	–	25	.167
† 2016 A10 Tournament winner As of March 25, 2016; Rankings from AP poll

The 2015–16 UMass Minutewomen basketball team represented the University of Massachusetts Amherst during the 2015–16 college basketball season. The Minutewomen, led by sixth year head coach Sharon Dawley, were members of the Atlantic 10 Conference and played their home games at the William D. Mullins Memorial Center. They finished the season 12–18, 5–11 in A-10 to finish in a 4 way tie for tenth place. They advanced to the second round of the A-10 women's tournament, where they lost to Fordham.

On March 6, Dawley was fired. She finished at UMass with a six year record of 46–133.

== 2015–16 media ==
All non-televised Minutewomen home games and conference road games will stream on the A-10 Digital Network. WMUA will carry Minutewomen games with Cody Chrusciel on the call.

== Roster ==
2015–16 UMass Minutewomen women's basketball team
Players
Coaches

Pos.	#	Name	Height	Year	Previous school	Hometown
F/C	0	Maggie Mulligan	6 ft 2 in (1.88 m)	So	Boston Latin School	Boston, MA
G	2	Amber Dillon	5 ft 2 in (1.57 m)	RS Sr	Brookline; Maine	Jamaica Plain, MA
G	3	Alyx Stiff	5 ft 9 in (1.75 m)	So	Quest Preparatory Academy	Las Vegas, NV
F	10	Stephanie Foukaris	6 ft 1 in (1.85 m)	Fr	Pascal English School Nicosia	Nicosia, Cyprus
F	11	Ciara Rosten	6 ft 2 in (1.88 m)	So	Maryvale	Cheektowaga, NY
G	13	Bria Stallworth	5 ft 6 in (1.68 m)	Fr	Homewood Flossmoor	Flossmoor, IL
G	15	Cierra Dillard	5 ft 9 in (1.75 m)	Fr	Gates Chili	Rochester, NY
G	21	Victoria Stewart	5 ft 7 in (1.7 m)	Jr	Amherst-Pelham Regional	Amherst, MA
G	22	Jessica George	5 ft 10 in (1.78 m)	Fr	North Point	Waldorf, MD
G/F	23	Rashida Timbilla	6 ft 1 in (1.85 m)	Sr	John McCrae	Ottawa, ON
G	25	Leah McDerment	5 ft 10 in (1.78 m)	So	Priestnall School	Stockport, England
F/C	31	Kymber Hill	6 ft 2 in (1.88 m)	Jr	Althoff Catholic	Belleville, IL
F	32	Alyssa Lawrence	6 ft 1 in (1.85 m)	RS So	The Ursuline School; San Diego State	New Rochelle, NY

Head coach

- Sharon Dawley (Saint Anselm)

Assistant coach(es)

- Jen MacAulay (Vermont)
- Yolanda Griffith (Florida Atlantic)
- Chris Wielgus (Springfield)

Legend

- (C) Team captain
- (S) Suspended
- (I) Ineligible
- (W) Walk-on
- Injured
- Current redshirt

Roster
Last update: done

== Schedule ==
Date time, TV	Rank^{#}	Opponent^{#}	Result	Record	Site (attendance) city, state
Non-conference regular season
11/15/2015*; 2:05 pm		at Holy Cross	W 74–60	1–0	Hart Center (767); Worcester, MA
11/18/2015*; 7:00 pm		at Harvard	L 65–67	1–1	Lavietes Pavilion (404); Cambridge, MA
11/21/2015*; 5:00 pm		Buffalo	L 48–56	1–2	Mullins Center (334); Amherst, MA
11/27/2015*; 9:30 pm		at Colorado; Omni Hotels Classic semifinals	L 63–90	1–3	Coors Events Center (1,611); Boulder, CO
11/28/2015*; 7:00 pm		vs. Ball State; Omni Hotels Classic 3rd place game	L 54–81	1–4	Coors Events Center; Boulder, CO
12/02/2015*; 5:00 pm		at Bryant	W 86–69	2–4	Chace Athletic Center (104); Smithfield, RI
12/09/2015*; 7:00 pm		Hofstra	W 57–56	3–4	Mullins Center (226); Amherst, MA
12/12/2015*; 1:00 pm		at Central Connecticut	L 68–78 ^{OT}	3–5	William H. Detrick Gymnasium (517); New Britain, CT
12/14/2015*; 7:00 pm		at No. 13 Duke	L 46–70	3–6	Cameron Indoor Stadium (3,602); Durham, NC
12/19/2015*; 6:00 pm		Boston University	W 73–56	4–6	Mullins Center (418); Amherst, MA
12/22/2015*; 2:00 pm		Hartford	W 63–56	5–6	Mullins Center (256); Amherst, MA
12/30/2015*; 7:00 pm		UMass Lowell	W 84–58	6–6	Mullins Center (526); Amherst, MA
Atlantic 10 regular season
01/02/2016; 2:00 pm		VCU	L 66–74	6–7 (0–1)	Mullins Center (385); Amherst, MA
01/06/2016; 7:00 pm		Saint Joseph's	L 58–62	6–8 (0–2)	Mullins Center (220); Amherst, MA
01/10/2016; 5:00 pm, ASN		at St. Bonaventure	L 41–66	6–9 (0–3)	Reilly Center (1,057); Amherst, MA
01/13/2016; 5:00 pm		at Saint Louis	L 49–69	6–10 (0–4)	Chaifetz Arena (203); St. Louis, MO
01/16/2016; 7:00 pm		Richmond	L 68–74	6–11 (0–5)	Mullins Center (255); Amherst, MA
01/20/2016; 7:00 pm		at George Washington	L 50–67	6–12 (0–6)	Charles E. Smith Center (565); Washington, D.C.
01/27/2016; 12:00 pm		Rhode Island	L 79–80	6–13 (0–7)	Mullins Center (1,281); Amherst, MA
01/30/2016; 2:00 pm		at George Mason	L 59–64	6–14 (0–8)	EagleBank Arena (566); Fairfax, VA
02/02/2016; 7:00 pm		at Duquesne	L 64–73 ^{OT}	6–15 (0–9)	Palumbo Center (747); Pittsburgh, PA
02/06/2016; 2:00 pm		Fordham	L 55–60	6–16 (0–10)	Mullins Center (211); Amherst, MA
02/10/2016; 7:00 pm		at La Salle	L 57–66	6–17 (0–11)	Tom Gola Arena (274); Philadelphia, PA
02/13/2016; 2:00 pm		St. Bonaventure	W 69–60	7–17 (1–11)	Mullins Center (374); Amherst, MA
02/17/2016; 7:00 pm		Dayton	W 76–69	8–17 (2–11)	Mullins Center (461); Amherst, MA
02/21/2016; 2:00 pm		at Davidson	W 66–62	9–17 (3–11)	John M. Belk Arena; Davidson, NC
02/24/2016; 7:00 pm		at Rhode Island	W 71–64	10–17 (4–11)	Ryan Center (494); Kingston, RI
02/27/2016; 2:00 pm		La Salle	W 80–57	11–17 (5–11)	Mullins Center (402); Amherst, MA
Atlantic 10 Women's Tournament
03/02/2016; 7:00 pm		vs. La Salle; First Round	W 81–65	12–17	Richmond Coliseum (604); Richmond, VA
03/03/2016; 7:00 pm		vs. Fordham; Second Round	L 63–74 ^{OT}	12–18	Richmond Coliseum; Richmond, VA
*Non-conference game. ^{#}Rankings from AP Poll. (#) Tournament seedings in parentheses. All times are in Eastern Time.

== Rankings ==
2015–16 NCAA Division I women's basketball rankings

Regular season polls
Poll	Pre- Season	Week 2	Week 3	Week 4	Week 5	Week 6	Week 7	Week 8	Week 9	Week 10	Week 11	Week 12	Week 13	Week 14	Week 15	Week 16	Week 17	Week 18	Final
AP																			
Coaches																			

Legend
	Increase in ranking
	Decrease in ranking
	No change
(RV)	Received votes
(NR)	Not ranked

== See also ==
- 2015–16 UMass Minutemen basketball team
