= 2015–16 La Salle Explorers women's basketball team =

Intercollegiate basketball season

2015–16 La Salle Explorers women's basketball
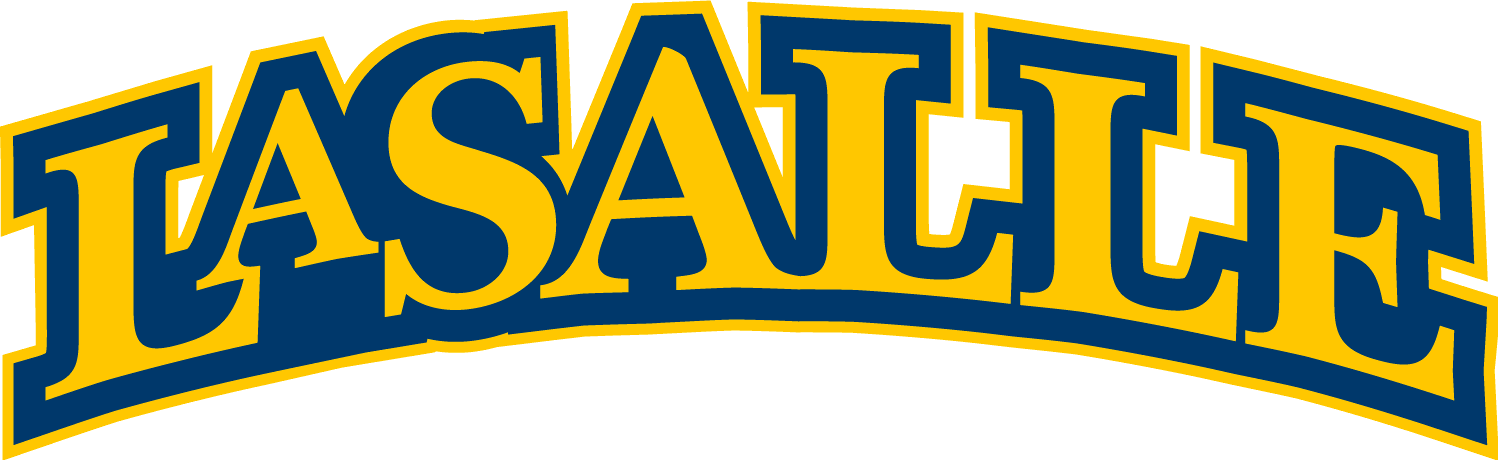

Hawk Holiday Classic Champions
- Conference: Atlantic 10 Conference
- Record: 5–25 (2–14 A-10)
- Head coach: Jeff Williams (6th season)
- Assistant coaches: Morra Gill; Gina Catanzariti; Christal Caldwell
- Home arena: Tom Gola Arena

2015–16 Atlantic 10 women's basketball standings
	Conf.				Overall
Team	W		L	PCT	W		L	PCT
Duquesne	13	–	3	.813	28	–	6	.824
George Washington †	13	–	3	.813	26	–	7	.788
Saint Louis	13	–	3	.813	26	–	8	.765
St. Bonaventure	12	–	4	.750	24	–	8	.750
VCU	10	–	6	.625	23	–	10	.697
Saint Joseph's	8	–	8	.500	14	–	15	.483
Fordham	8	–	8	.500	14	–	17	.452
Dayton	7	–	9	.438	14	–	15	.483
George Mason	6	–	10	.375	12	–	19	.387
Richmond	5	–	11	.313	13	–	18	.419
Rhode Island	5	–	11	.313	12	–	18	.400
UMass	5	–	11	.313	12	–	18	.400
Davidson	5	–	11	.313	11	–	19	.367
La Salle	2	–	14	.125	5	–	25	.167
† 2016 A10 Tournament winner As of March 25, 2016; Rankings from AP poll

The 2015–16 La Salle Explorers women's basketball team represented La Salle University during the 2015–16 college basketball season. The Explorers were led by sixth year head coach Jeff Williams. The Explorers were members of the Atlantic 10 Conference and played their home games at the Tom Gola Arena. They finished the season 5–25, 2–14 in A-10 play to finish in last place. They lost in the first round of the Atlantic 10 women's tournament to UMass.

== 2015–16 media ==
=== La Salle Explorers Sports Network ===
Select Explorers games will be broadcast online by the La Salle Portal. The A-10 Digital Network will carry all non-televised Explorers home games and most conference road games.

== Roster ==
2015–16 La Salle Explorers women's basketball team
Players
Coaches

Pos.	#	Name	Height	Year	Previous school	Hometown
G	4	Jordan Williams	5 ft 11 in (1.8 m)	So	South Grand Prairie	Grand Prairie, TX
F/C	5	Amber Wilks	6 ft 3 in (1.91 m)	Fr	Walnut Hills	Cincinnati, OH
G	11	Jasmine Alston	5 ft 9 in (1.75 m)	Jr	Bishop Loughlin	Long Island City, NY
G/F	12	Iyonna Crenshaw	6 ft 0 in (1.83 m)	So	Neptune	Neptune, NJ
F	13	Anemone Scheel	6 ft 1 in (1.85 m)	Fr	New Hope Christian Academy	Rungsted Kyst, Denmark
G	15	Adreana Miller	5 ft 11 in (1.8 m)	Fr	Franklin	Somerset, NJ
G/F	21	Amy Griffin	6 ft 1 in (1.85 m)	So	Southwest Atlanta Christian	Atlanta, GA
F	22	Deja Bullock	6 ft 0 in (1.83 m)	Jr	Triton	Magnolia, NJ
F/C	31	Ebony Wells	6 ft 2 in (1.88 m)	RS Sr	Grovetown; Florida State/Chipola College	Grovetown, GA
F	34	Micahya Owens	5 ft 11 in (1.8 m)	Jr	Willingboro	Willingboro, NJ
F	44	Ashanti Freeland	6 ft 3 in (1.91 m)	So	Gwynn Park	Brandywine, MD
F	55	Lisa Mintzer	6 ft 4 in (1.93 m)	Jr	Cardinal O'Hara	Havertown, PA

Head coach

Jeff Williams (Howard)

Assistant coach(es)

Morra Gill (Dillard)
Gina Catanzariti (Rowan)
Christal Caldwell (West Virginia)

Legend

- (C) Team captain
- (S) Suspended
- (I) Ineligible
- (W) Walk-on
- Injured
- Current redshirt

Roster

== Schedule ==
Date time, TV	Rank^{#}	Opponent^{#}	Result	Record	Site (attendance) city, state
Non-conference regular season
11/13/2015*; 7:00 pm		at Fairfield	L 59–62	0–1	Alumni Hall (272); Fairfield, CT
11/18/2015*; 7:00 pm		Temple	L 48–77	0–2	Tom Gola Arena (419); Philadelphia, PA
11/21/2015*; 7:00 pm		Robert Morris	L 45–76	0–3	Tom Gola Arena (200); Philadelphia, PA
11/25/2015*; 2:00 pm		at Wake Forest	L 53–61	0–4	LJVM Coliseum (365); Winston-Salem, NC
11/28/2015*; 1:00 pm		vs. Milwaukee; Miami Thanksgiving Classic	L 53–69	0–5	BankUnited Center (178); Coral Gables, FL
11/29/2015*; 1:00 pm		at Miami (FL); Miami Thanksgiving Classic	L 58–86	0–6	BankUnited Center (570); Coral Gables, FL
12/02/2015*; 7:00 pm		at Howard	W 71–68	1–6	Burr Gymnasium (175); Washington, D.C.
12/06/2015*; 1:00 pm		at UMBC	L 29–60	1–7	Retriever Activities Center (301); Catonsville, MD
12/16/2015*; 7:00 pm		North Texas	L 63–69	1–8	Tom Gola Arena (217); Philadelphia, PA
12/20/2015*; 1:00 pm		Villanova	L 56–67	1–9	Tom Gola Arena (278); Philadelphia, PA
12/29/2015*; 1:00 pm		vs. Norfolk State; Hawk Holiday Classic semifinals	W 67–59	2–9	Multipurpose Activity Center; West Long Branch, NJ
12/30/2015*; 3:00 pm		at Monmouth; Hawk Holiday Classic championship	W 65–50	3–9	Multipurpose Activity Center (657); West Long Branch, NJ
Atlantic 10 regular season
01/02/2016; 11:00 am, CBSSN		Richmond	L 43–60	3–10 (0–1)	Tom Gola Arena (642); Philadelphia, PA
01/06/2016; 7:00 pm		Davidson	L 58–66	3–11 (0–2)	Tom Gola Arena (321); Philadelphia, PA
01/10/2016; 2:00 pm		at George Mason	L 70–79	3–12 (0–3)	EagleBank Arena (482); Fairfax, VA
01/13/2016; 7:00 pm		at George Washington	L 59–83	3–13 (0–4)	Charles E. Smith Center (754); Washington, D.C.
01/16/2016; 1:00 pm		Rhode Island	L 61–72	3–14 (0–5)	Tom Gola Arena (357); Philadelphia, PA
01/18/2016*; 7:00 pm		Penn	L 68–78	3–15	Tom Gola Arena (385); Philadelphia, PA
01/23/2016; 8:00 pm		at Saint Louis	L 70–79	3–16 (0–6)	Chaifetz Arena (750); St. Louis, MO
01/27/2016; 7:00 pm		Dayton	L 51–67	3–17 (0–7)	Tom Gola Arena (471); Philadelphia, PA
01/30/2016; 2:00 pm		at Saint Joseph's	L 55–64	3–18 (0–8)	Hagan Arena (831); Philadelphia, PA
02/03/2016; 7:00 pm		at Rhode Island	L 52–62	3–19 (0–9)	Ryan Center (433); Kingston, RI
02/07/2016; 1:00 pm		VCU	L 76–84 ^{OT}	3–20 (0–10)	Tom Gola Arena (463); Philadelphia, PA
02/10/2016; 7:00 pm		Massachusetts	W 66–57	4–20 (1–10)	Tom Gola Arena (274); Philadelphia, PA
02/13/2016; 2:00 pm		at Fordham	L 44–54	4–21 (1–11)	Rose Hill Gymnasium (1,018); Bronx, NY
02/17/2016; 12:00 pm		Saint Joseph's	W 75–70	5–21 (2–11)	Tom Gola Arena (742); Philadelphia, PA
02/20/2016; 1:00 pm		St. Bonaventure	L 63–70	5–22 (2–12)	Tom Gola Arena (536); Philadelphia, PA
02/24/2016; 7:00 pm		at Duquesne	L 49–74	5–23 (2–13)	Palumbo Center (595); Pittsburgh, PA
02/27/2016; 2:00 pm		at Massachusetts	L 57–80	5–24 (2–14)	Mullins Center (402); Amherst, MA
Atlantic 10 Women's Tournament
03/02/2016; 7:00 pm		vs. Massachusetts; First Round	L 65–81	5–25	Richmond Coliseum (604); Richmond, VA
*Non-conference game. ^{#}Rankings from AP Poll. (#) Tournament seedings in parentheses. All times are in Eastern Time.

== Rankings ==
2015–16 NCAA Division I women's basketball rankings

+ Regular season polls	Poll	Pre- Season	Week 2	Week 3	Week 4	Week 5	Week 6	Week 7	Week 8	Week 9	Week 10	Week 11	Week 12	Week 13	Week 14	Week 15	Week 16	Week 17	Week 18	Final
AP																				
Coaches																				

Legend
	Increase in ranking
	Decrease in ranking
	No change
(RV)	Received votes
(NR)	Not ranked

== See also ==
- 2015–16 La Salle Explorers men's basketball team
