= 2015–16 Davidson Wildcats women's basketball team =

Intercollegiate basketball season

2015–16 Davidson Wildcats women's basketball

UNCW Thanksgiving Tournament Champions
- Conference: Atlantic 10 Conference
- Record: 11–19 (5–11 A-10)
- Head coach: Michele Savage (6th season)
- Assistant coaches: Mary Ciuk; Kira Mowen; Shannon Gholar
- Home arena: John M. Belk Arena

2015–16 Atlantic 10 women's basketball standings
	Conf.				Overall
Team	W		L	PCT	W		L	PCT
Duquesne	13	–	3	.813	28	–	6	.824
George Washington †	13	–	3	.813	26	–	7	.788
Saint Louis	13	–	3	.813	26	–	8	.765
St. Bonaventure	12	–	4	.750	24	–	8	.750
VCU	10	–	6	.625	23	–	10	.697
Saint Joseph's	8	–	8	.500	14	–	15	.483
Fordham	8	–	8	.500	14	–	17	.452
Dayton	7	–	9	.438	14	–	15	.483
George Mason	6	–	10	.375	12	–	19	.387
Richmond	5	–	11	.313	13	–	18	.419
Rhode Island	5	–	11	.313	12	–	18	.400
UMass	5	–	11	.313	12	–	18	.400
Davidson	5	–	11	.313	11	–	19	.367
La Salle	2	–	14	.125	5	–	25	.167
† 2016 A10 Tournament winner As of March 25, 2016; Rankings from AP poll

The 2015–16 Davidson Wildcats women's basketball team represented Davidson College during the 2015–16 college basketball season. The Wildcats were led by sixth year head coach Michele Savage. The Wildcats were second year members of the Atlantic 10 Conference and played their home games at the John M. Belk Arena. They finished the season 11–19, 5–11 in A-10 to finish a 4-way tie for tenth place. They lost in the first round of the A-10 women's tournament to Richmond.

== 2015–16 media ==
=== Davidson Wildcats Sports Network ===
Select Wildcats games will be broadcast on Teamline with Derek Smith and Leslie Urban providing the call. Most home games will also be featured on the A-10 Digital Network. Select games will be televised.

== Roster ==
2015–16 Davidson Wildcats women's basketball team
Players
Coaches

Pos.	#	Name	Height	Year	Previous school	Hometown
G	0	Kianna Speight	5 ft 8 in (1.73 m)	Fr	Conway	Conway, AR
G	1	Kayla Seymour	5 ft 9 in (1.75 m)	Jr	Panther Creek; UMBC	Raleigh, NC
G	2	Saadia Timpton	5 ft 8 in (1.73 m)	Fr	Myers Park	Charlotte, NC
G	5	Justine Lyon	5 ft 9 in (1.75 m)	Fr	Hillside	Durham, NC
F	10	Hannah Early	6 ft 1 in (1.85 m)	Sr	Hopewell	Huntersville, NC
F	11	Kyla Roland	6 ft 2 in (1.88 m)	Fr	Harrison	Farmington Hills, MI
G	12	Mya Webb	5 ft 8 in (1.73 m)	Fr	Hillside	Durham, NC
G	13	Diona Johnson	5 ft 9 in (1.75 m)	So	Gates Chili	Rochester, NY
G	22	Alexandra Long	5 ft 10 in (1.78 m)	Sr	Flint Hill	Great Falls, VA
F	23	Dakota Dukes	6 ft 0 in (1.83 m)	Sr	Cary Christian School	Raleigh, NC
F	24	Rachel Piles	6 ft 3 in (1.91 m)	Jr	Allen	Allen, TX
G	32	Melanie Ransom	5 ft 9 in (1.75 m)	RS So	Marian Catholic	Lansing, IL
F	42	Jordan Woods	6 ft 2 in (1.88 m)	So	Rancocas Valley	Mount Holly, NJ
F	44	Mackenzie Latt	6 ft 1 in (1.85 m)	RS Fr	Richland Gull Lake	Kalamazoo, MI
G		Chloe Johnson (I) (redshirt)	5 ft 7 in (1.7 m)	Jr	St. Mary's; San Diego State	Phoenix, AZ

Head coach

- Michele Savage (Northwestern)

Assistant coach(es)

- Mary Ciuk (Florida)
- Kira Mowen (Youngstown State)
- Shannon Gholar (Cal State San Bernardino)

Legend

- (C) Team captain
- (S) Suspended
- (I) Ineligible
- (W) Walk-on
- Injured
- Current redshirt

Roster

== Schedule ==
Date time, TV	Rank^{#}	Opponent^{#}	Result	Record	Site (attendance) city, state
Non-conference regular season
11/13/2015*; 6:00 pm, ESPN3		at Furman	W 69–51	1–0	Timmons Arena (507); Greenville, SC
11/17/2015*; 7:00 pm		at Wake Forest	L 58–77	1–1	LJVM Coliseum (383); Winston-Salem, NC
11/22/2015*; 2:00 pm		at NC State	L 48–52	1–2	Broughton HS (1,408); Raleigh, NC
11/24/2015*; 7:00 pm		at High Point	W 62–60 ^{2OT}	2–2	Millis Center (701); High Point, NC
11/27/2015*; 12:00 pm		vs. Bowling Green; UNC Wilmington Thanksgiving Tournament	W 60–56	3–2	Trask Coliseum; Wilmington, NC
11/28/2015*; 2:00 pm		at UNC Wilmington; UNC Wilmington Thanksgiving Tournament	W 77–50	4–2	Trask Coliseum (327); Wilmington, NC
12/02/2015*; 11:30 am		at Radford	L 68–79	4–3	Dedmon Center (1,097); Radford, VA
12/05/2015*; 4:00 pm		Western Carolina	W 64–51	5–3	John M. Belk Arena; Davidson, NC
12/09/2015*; 6:00 pm		No. 25 Michigan State	L 44–73	5–4	John M. Belk Arena (3,714); Davidson, NC
12/12/2015*; 2:00 pm		South Carolina State	W 63–51	6–4	John M. Belk Arena (328); Davidson, NC
12/18/2015*; 11:30 am		East Tennessee State	L 58–65	6–5	John M. Belk Arena (864); Davidson, NC
12/20/2015*; 2:00 pm, MI-Ch 4		Charlotte	L 88–99	6–6	John M. Belk Arena (482); Davidson, NC
12/30/2015*; 2:00 pm		at James Madison	L 45–87	6–7	JMU Convocation Center (2,353); Harrisonburg, VA
Atlantic 10 regular season
01/02/2016; 2:00 pm		at Fordham	L 40–51	6–8 (0–1)	Rose Hill Gymnasium (334); Bronx, NY
01/06/2016; 7:00 pm		at La Salle	W 66–58	7–8 (1–1)	Tom Gola Arena (321); Philadelphia, PA
01/10/2016; 2:00 pm, MI-Ch 4		Saint Louis	L 50–79	7–9 (1–2)	John M. Belk Arena (389); Davidson, NC
01/13/2016; 7:00 pm		St. Bonaventure	L 47–59	7–10 (1–3)	John M. Belk Arena (387); Davidson, NC
01/17/2016; 6:00 pm, CBSSN		at VCU	W 56–50	8–10 (2–3)	Siegel Center (933); Richmond, VA
01/20/2016; 7:00 pm		Fordham	W 69–51	9–10 (3–3)	John M. Belk Arena (443); Davidson, NC
01/23/2016; 1:00 pm		at Rhode Island	L 62–78	9–11 (3–4)	Ryan Center (677); Kingston, RI
01/27/2016; 7:00 pm		George Washington	L 60–79	9–12 (3–5)	John M. Belk Arena (411); Davidson, NC
01/31/2016; 2:00 pm		at Dayton	L 66–77	9–13 (3–6)	UD Arena (2,988); Dayton, OH
02/03/2016; 7:00 pm		George Mason	W 68–63	10–13 (4–6)	John M. Belk Arena (531); Davidson, NC
02/06/2016; 2:00 pm		Duquesne	L 62–77	10–14 (4–7)	John M. Belk Arena (584); Davidson, NC
02/10/2016; 12:00 pm		at Richmond	W 67–59	11–14 (5–7)	Robins Center (1,204); Richmond, VA
02/15/2016; 12:00 pm, NBCSN		at Saint Louis	L 51–88	11–15 (5–8)	Chaifetz Arena (2,084); St. Louis, MO
02/21/2016; 2:00 pm, MI-Ch 4		Massachusetts	L 62–66	11–16 (5–9)	John M. Belk Arena; Davidson, NC
02/24/2016; 7:00 pm		at Saint Joseph's	L 54–87	11–17 (5–10)	Hagan Arena (751); Philadelphia, PA
02/27/2016; 2:00 pm		VCU	L 59–74	11–18 (5–11)	John M. Belk Arena (742); Davidson, NC
Atlantic 10 Women's Tournament
03/02/2016; 4:30 pm		vs. Richmond; First Round	L 51–70	11–19	Richmond Coliseum; Richmond, VA
*Non-conference game. ^{#}Rankings from AP Poll. (#) Tournament seedings in parentheses. All times are in Eastern Time.

== Rankings ==
2015–16 NCAA Division I women's basketball rankings

Regular season polls
Poll	Pre- Season	Week 2	Week 3	Week 4	Week 5	Week 6	Week 7	Week 8	Week 9	Week 10	Week 11	Week 12	Week 13	Week 14	Week 15	Week 16	Week 17	Week 18	Final
AP																			
Coaches																			

Legend
	Increase in ranking
	Decrease in ranking
	No change
(RV)	Received votes
(NR)	Not ranked

== See also ==
- 2015–16 Davidson Wildcats men's basketball team
