= Daynia La-Force =

American basketball player and coach

Playing career
- 1991–1995: Georgetown

Coaching career (HC unless noted)
- 1995–2002: LIU Brooklyn (asst.)
- 2002–2005: St. John's (asst.)
- 2005–2006: New Haven
- 2006–2014: Northeastern
- 2014–2019: Rhode Island
- 2020–present: Atlanta Dream (asst.)

Accomplishments and honors

Awards
- CAA Coach of the Year (2013)

Daynia La-Force is an American women's basketball coach. She spent 25 years coaching college women's basketball. In 2021, She was an assistant coach with the WNBA's Atlanta Dream. She played college basketball at the Georgetown University. In May 2014, she was hired as head coach of Rhode Island Rams women's basketball after head coaching stints at Division II University of New Haven and Division I Northeastern University. She also served as an assistant coach at St. John's and LIU Brooklyn. An African American, La-Force became the first minority woman head coach in URI history when she was hired in May 2014. Her son Terance Mann played collegiately for Florida State and currently plays for the NBA's Brooklyn Nets.
