= 2015–16 Saint Joseph's Hawks women's basketball team =

Intercollegiate basketball season

2015–16 Saint Joseph's Hawks women's basketball
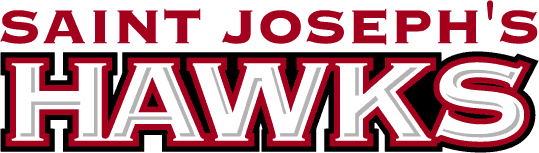

Hawk Classic Champions
- Conference: Atlantic 10 Conference
- Record: 14–15 (8–8 A-10)
- Head coach: Cindy Griffin (15th season)
- Assistant coaches: Susan Moran; John Hampton; Stephanie McCaffrey
- Home arena: Hagan Arena

2015–16 Atlantic 10 women's basketball standings
	Conf.				Overall
Team	W		L	PCT	W		L	PCT
Duquesne	13	–	3	.813	28	–	6	.824
George Washington †	13	–	3	.813	26	–	7	.788
Saint Louis	13	–	3	.813	26	–	8	.765
St. Bonaventure	12	–	4	.750	24	–	8	.750
VCU	10	–	6	.625	23	–	10	.697
Saint Joseph's	8	–	8	.500	14	–	15	.483
Fordham	8	–	8	.500	14	–	17	.452
Dayton	7	–	9	.438	14	–	15	.483
George Mason	6	–	10	.375	12	–	19	.387
Richmond	5	–	11	.313	13	–	18	.419
Rhode Island	5	–	11	.313	12	–	18	.400
UMass	5	–	11	.313	12	–	18	.400
Davidson	5	–	11	.313	11	–	19	.367
La Salle	2	–	14	.125	5	–	25	.167
† 2016 A10 Tournament winner As of March 25, 2016; Rankings from AP poll

The 2015–16 Saint Joseph's Hawks women's basketball team represented the Saint Joseph's University during the 2015–16 college basketball season. The Hawks, led by fifteenth year head coach Cindy Griffin. The Hawks were members of the Atlantic 10 Conference and play their home games at Hagan Arena. They finished the season 14–15, 8–8 in A-10 play to finish in a tie for sixth place. They lost in the second round of the A-10 women's tournament to Rhode Island.

== 2015–16 media ==
All non-televised Hawks home games will air on the A-10 Digital Network. All Hawks games will be streamed via the Saint Joseph's Sports Network on sjuhawks.com.

== Roster ==
2015–16 Saint Joseph's Hawks women's basketball team
Players
Coaches

Pos.	#	Name	Height	Year	Previous school	Hometown
G	2	Mackenzie Rule	5 ft 6 in (1.68 m)	Jr	Cardinal O'Hara	West Chester, PA
G	3	Ciara Andrews	5 ft 9 in (1.75 m)	Sr	Cheltenham	Glenside, PA
G	4	Kristalyn Baisden	5 ft 10 in (1.78 m)	Fr	Berkshire School	East Hartford, CT
G	12	Alyssa Monaghan	5 ft 5 in (1.65 m)	Fr	Bonner Prendergast	Drexel Hill, PA
G	15	Kathleen Fitzpatrick	5 ft 9 in (1.75 m)	Jr	Academy of Notre Dame de Namur	Drexel Hill, PA
G	20	Jazmin Horne	5 ft 7 in (1.7 m)	Jr	Franklin; Eastern Arizona College	Seattle, WA
G	21	Avery Marz	5 ft 7 in (1.7 m)	RS Fr	Wilson West Lawn	Sinking Springs, PA
G	23	Jordan Strode	5 ft 8 in (1.73 m)	Sr	Hickory Ridge	Harrisburg, NC
G	30	Sarah Veilleux	6 ft 0 in (1.83 m)	RS Fr	RHAM	Hebron, CT
G	32	Chelsea Woods	6 ft 0 in (1.83 m)	So	Freire Charter	Philadelphia, PA
F	33	Adashia Franklyn	6 ft 1 in (1.85 m)	So	West Chester Bayard Rustin	West Chester, PA
F	34	Amanda Fioravanti	6 ft 1 in (1.85 m)	RS So	Our Lady of Good Counsel	Frederick, MD
F	35	Michala Clay	6 ft 0 in (1.83 m)	Fr	Roland Park Country School	Baltimore, MD
F	40	Candace Belvedere	6 ft 2 in (1.88 m)	So	Kellenberg Memorial	Merrick, NY
F	41	Sarah Fairbanks	6 ft 1 in (1.85 m)	Sr	Elizabethtown Area	Elizabethtown, PA

Head coach

Cindy Griffin (Saint Joseph's)

Assistant coach(es)

Susan Moran (Saint Joseph's)
John Hampton (Mansfield)
Stephanie McCaffrey (Saint Joseph's)

Legend

- (C) Team captain
- (S) Suspended
- (I) Ineligible
- (W) Walk-on
- Injured
- Current redshirt

Roster

== Schedule ==
Date time, TV	Rank^{#}	Opponent^{#}	Result	Record	Site (attendance) city, state
Non-conference regular season
11/13/2015*; 5:00 pm		Rutgers	L 65–78	0–1	Hagan Arena; Philadelphia, PA
11/21/2015*; 2:00 pm		Seton Hall	L 54–66	0–2	Hagan Arena (921); Philadelphia, PA
11/24/2015*; 7:00 pm		at Villanova; Holy War	L 49–55	0–3	The Pavilion (1,151); Villanova, PA
11/29/2015*; 7:00 pm		at Temple; Rivalry	W 70–67	1–3	McGonigle Hall (928); Philadelphia, PA
12/02/2015*; 11:00 am		at Lehigh	W 63–62	2–3	Stabler Arena (3,659); Bethlehem, PA
12/05/2015*; 2:00 pm		at Hofstra	L 62–75	2–4	Hofstra Arena (143); Hempstead, NY
12/08/2015*; 5:00 pm		Penn	W 50–46	3–4	Hagan Arena; Philadelphia, PA
12/13/2015*; 2:00 pm		Drexel	W 53–46	4–4	Hagan Arena (1,085); Philadelphia, PA
12/17/2015*; 11:30 am		Iona	L 75–81	4–5	Hagan Arena (1,667); Philadelphia, PA
12/21/2015*; 7:00 pm		No. 3 Notre Dame	L 55–91	4–6	Hagan Arena (3,411); Philadelphia, PA
12/28/2015*; 1:00 pm		UMBC; Hawk Classic semifinals	W 104–45	5–6	Hagan Arena (828); Philadelphia, PA
12/29/2015*; 3:00 pm		Central Michigan; Hawk Classic championship	W 76–66	6–6	Hagan Arena (743); Philadelphia, PA
Atlantic 10 regular season
01/03/2016; 3:00 pm, CBSSN		George Washington	L 45–70	6–7 (0–1)	Hagan Arena (673); Philadelphia, PA
01/06/2016; 7:00 pm		at Massachusetts	W 62–58	7–7 (1–1)	Mullins Center (220); Amherst, MA
01/10/2016; 1:00 pm		at VCU	W 66–63	8–7 (2–1)	Siegel Center (687); Richmond, VA
01/13/2016; 7:00 pm		Richmond	W 64–53	9–7 (3–1)	Hagan Arena (323); Philadelphia, PA
01/17/2016; 4:00 pm, CBSSN		at Fordham	L 40–47	9–8 (3–2)	Rose Hill Gymnasium (1,215); Bronx, NY
01/20/2016; 7:00 pm		Saint Louis	L 66–77	9–9 (3–3)	Hagan Arena (337); Philadelphia, PA
01/24/2016; 5:00 pm, CBSSN		Dayton	L 61–71	9–10 (3–4)	Hagan Arena (224); Philadelphia, PA
01/27/2016; 7:00 pm		at St. Bonaventure	L 51–65	9–11 (3–5)	Reilly Center (955); Olean, NY
01/30/2016; 2:00 pm		La Salle	W 64–55	10–11 (4–5)	Hagan Arena (831); Philadelphia, PA
02/07/2016; 2:00 pm, ASN		at George Mason	L 41–55	10–12 (4–6)	EagleBank Arena (1,464); Fairfax, VA
02/10/2016; 7:00 pm		Fordham	W 61–51	11–12 (5–6)	Hagan Arena (910); Philadelphia, PA
02/13/2016; 2:00 pm		at Duquesne	L 59–73	11–13 (5–7)	Palumbo Center (970); Pittsburgh, PA
02/17/2016; 12:00 pm		at La Salle	L 70–75	11–14 (5–8)	Tom Gola Arena (742); Philadelphia, PA
02/20/2016; 2:00 pm		Rhode Island	W 74–63	12–14 (6–8)	Hagan Arena (1,267); Philadelphia, PA
02/24/2016; 7:00 pm		Davidson	W 87–54	13–14 (7–8)	Hagan Arena (751); Philadelphia, PA
02/27/2016; 2:00 pm		at Richmond	W 59–57	14–14 (8–8)	Robins Center (1,107); Richmond, VA
Atlantic 10 Women's Tournament
03/03/2016; 4:30 pm		vs. Rhode Island; Second Round	L 76–81	14–15	Richmond Coliseum; Richmond, VA
*Non-conference game. ^{#}Rankings from AP Poll. (#) Tournament seedings in parentheses. All times are in Eastern Time.

== Rankings ==
2015–16 NCAA Division I women's basketball rankings

Regular season polls
Poll	Pre- Season	Week 2	Week 3	Week 4	Week 5	Week 6	Week 7	Week 8	Week 9	Week 10	Week 11	Week 12	Week 13	Week 14	Week 15	Week 16	Week 17	Week 18	Final
AP																			
Coaches																			

Legend
	Increase in ranking
	Decrease in ranking
	No change
(RV)	Received votes
(NR)	Not ranked

== See also ==
- 2015–16 Saint Joseph's Hawks men's basketball team
