= 2023–24 Saint Joseph's Hawks women's basketball team =

American college basketball season

2023–24 Saint Joseph's Hawks women's basketball
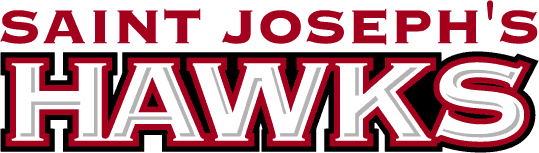

WBIT, Quarterfinals
- Conference: Atlantic 10 Conference
- Record: 28–6 (15–3 A-10)
- Head coach: Cindy Griffin (23rd season)
- Associate head coach: Melissa Dunne
- Assistant coaches: Katie Kuester; Ashley Prim; Joe Logan
- Home arena: Hagan Arena

2023–24 Atlantic 10 women's basketball standings
	Conf.				Overall
Team	W		L	PCT	W		L	PCT
Richmond †	16	–	2	.889	29	–	6	.829
VCU	15	–	3	.833	26	–	6	.813
Saint Joseph's	15	–	3	.833	28	–	6	.824
George Mason	14	–	4	.778	23	–	8	.742
Duquesne	13	–	5	.722	21	–	13	.618
Rhode Island	10	–	8	.556	21	–	14	.600
Saint Louis	9	–	9	.500	22	–	18	.550
Davidson*	8	–	10	.444	18	–	8	.692
Loyola Chicago	8	–	10	.444	15	–	16	.484
Fordham	8	–	10	.444	12	–	17	.414
George Washington	6	–	12	.333	13	–	18	.419
Dayton	5	–	13	.278	12	–	19	.387
La Salle	5	–	13	.278	8	–	22	.267
UMass	2	–	16	.111	5	–	27	.156
St. Bonaventure	1	–	17	.056	4	–	26	.133
† 2024 A10 tournament winner * Season cancelled on March 1, 2024.

The 2023–24 Saint Joseph's Hawks women's basketball team represented Saint Joseph's University during the 2023–24 NCAA Division I women's basketball season. The Hawks, led by 23rd-year head coach Cindy Griffin, played their home games at Hagan Arena in Philadelphia, Pennsylvania as members of the Atlantic 10 Conference.

== Previous season ==
The Hawks finished the 2022–23 season 20–11, 9–7 in A-10 play to finish in a tie for sixth place. As the #6 seed in the A-10 tournament, they defeated #11 seed Davidson in the second round, before falling to #3 seed and eventual tournament champions Saint Louis in the quarterfinals. They received an at-large bid into the WNIT, where they would be defeated by Seton Hall in the first round.

== Roster ==
2023–24 Saint Joseph's Hawks women's basketball team
Players
Coaches

Pos.	#	Name	Height	Year	Previous school	Hometown
F	0	Talya Brugler	6 ft 1 in (1.85 m)	Jr	Nazareth Area High School	Nazareth, Pennsylvania
G	2	Aleah Snead	5 ft 11 in (1.8 m)	Fr	William Penn Charter School	Philadelphia, Pennsylvania
G	3	Emma Boslet	5 ft 11 in (1.8 m)	Sr	St. Thomas Aquinas High School	Edison, New Jersey
F	4	Laura Ziegler	6 ft 2 in (1.88 m)	So	Falkonergaardens Gymnasium	Herlev, Denmark
G	5	Julia Nyström	5 ft 7 in (1.7 m)	Jr	Polhemskolan Lund	Lund, Sweden
G	11	Kaylie Griffin	5 ft 7 in (1.7 m)	Jr	Gwynedd Mercy Academy High School	Conshohocken, Pennsylvania
G	15	Gabby Casey	5 ft 9 in (1.75 m)	Fr	Lansdale Catholic High School	Quakertown, Pennsylvania
G	21	Mackenzie Smith	5 ft 10 in (1.78 m)	Jr	King's-Edgehill School	Shelburne, Nova Scotia
G	22	Chloe Welch	5 ft 9 in (1.75 m)	GS	Davidson	Colorado Springs, Colorado
G	24	Bridget Monaghan	5 ft 5 in (1.65 m)	GS	Scranton	Florham Park, New Jersey
F	30	Paula Maurina	6 ft 0 in (1.83 m)	Sr	Hartford	Riga, Latvia
G	33	Emirson Devenie	6 ft 1 in (1.85 m)	So	Royal Crown Academy	Melbourne, Australia
C	42	Lizzy Gruber	6 ft 4 in (1.93 m)	Fr	Gardiner High School	Gardiner, Maine

Head coach

- Cindy Griffin (Saint Joseph's)

Assistant coach(es)

- Melissa Dunne (Temple)
- Katie Kuester (Saint Joseph's)
- Ashley Prim (Saint Joseph's)
- Joe Logan (Loyola (MD))

Legend

- (C) Team captain
- (S) Suspended
- (I) Ineligible
- (W) Walk-on
- Injured
- Current redshirt

Roster
Last update: December 18, 2023

== Schedule and results ==
Date time, TV	Rank^{#}	Opponent^{#}	Result	Record	High points	High rebounds	High assists	Site (attendance) city, state
Non-conference regular season
November 7, 2023*; 7:00 pm, ESPN+		Rider	W 71–49	1–0	22 – Brugler	16 – Ziegler	5 – Nyström	Hagan Arena (650); Philadelphia, PA
November 11, 2023*; 12:00 pm, ESPN+		at Yale	W 66–45	2–0	25 – 2 Tied	9 – Smith	2 – Nyström	John J. Lee Amphitheater (475); New Haven, CT
November 14, 2023*; 6:00 pm, ESPN+		at Penn; Big 5	W 77–49	3–0	18 – Ziegler	14 – Ziegler	5 – 2 Tied	The Palestra (273); Philadelphia, PA
November 19, 2023*; 4:30 pm, FloSports		at Drexel; Big 5	W 64–53	4–0	26 – Brugler	12 – Ziegler	6 – Ziegler	Daskalakis Athletic Center (889); Philadelphia, PA
November 22, 2023*; 6:00 pm, ESPN+		at Temple; Big 5/Rivalry	W 67–65 ^{OT}	5–0	21 – Ziegler	13 – Ziegler	3 – Welch	Liacouras Center (1,016); Philadelphia, PA
November 28, 2023*; 6:00 pm, ESPN+		at Bucknell	W 71–46	6–0	23 – Brugler	11 – Ziegler	6 – Nyström	Sojka Pavilion (287); Lewisburg, PA
December 2, 2023*; 12:00 pm, ESPN+		North Florida	W 84–65	7–0	19 – Welch	6 – Ziegler	4 – Nyström	Hagan Arena (517); Philadelphia, PA
December 5, 2023*; 6:00 pm, ESPN+		at Boston University	W 62–47	8–0	22 – Smith	11 – Ziegler	5 – Ziegler	Case Gym (171); Boston, MA
December 7, 2023*; 7:00 pm, NBCPHI+/ESPN+		No. 11 Utah	L 48–74	8–1	16 – Brugler	8 – Ziegler	2 – 3 Tied	Hagan Arena (646); Philadelphia, PA
December 9, 2023*; 7:00 pm, ESPN+		Villanova; Big 5/Holy War	W 73–67	9–1	21 – Smith	11 – Ziegler	5 – Brugler	Hagan Arena (863); Philadelphia, PA
December 20, 2023*; 11:00 am, ESPN+		New Hampshire; Hawk Classic	W 72–54	10–1	24 – Brugler	8 – Welch	3 – 2 Tied	Hagan Arena (804); Philadelphia, PA
December 21, 2023*; 1:00 pm, ESPN+		UAB; Hawk Classic	W 63–57	11–1	22 – Welch	10 – Welch	6 – Brugler	Hagan Arena (434); Philadelphia, PA
A-10 regular season
December 30, 2023; 4:00 pm, ESPN+		at Fordham	W 76–49	12–1 (1–0)	20 – Brugler	8 – Brugler	6 – Ziegler	Rose Hill Gymnasium (1,969); Bronx, NY
January 3, 2024; 7:00 pm, ESPN+		George Washington	W 67–47	13–1 (2–0)	21 – Brugler	8 – 2 Tied	4 – Welch	Hagan Arena (461); Philadelphia, PA
January 6, 2024; 2:00 pm, ESPN+		Richmond	L 59–64	13–2 (2–1)	17 – Brugler	7 – Ziegler	5 – Boslet	Hagan Arena (650); Philadelphia, PA
January 9, 2024; 8:00 pm, ESPN+		at Saint Louis	W 69–57	14–2 (3–1)	18 – Ziegler	9 – 2 Tied	4 – 2 Tied	Chaifetz Arena (276); St. Louis, MO
January 13, 2024; 12:00 pm, ESPN+		Duquesne	W 77–62	15–2 (4–1)	25 – Ziegler	11 – Ziegler	6 – Brugler	Hagan Arena (507); Philadelphia, PA
January 15, 2024; 12:00 pm, CBSSN		La Salle; Big 5	W 64–39	16–2 (5–1)	26 – Brugler	16 – Brugler	6 – Brugler	Hagan Arena (715); Philadelphia, PA
January 21, 2024; 12:00 pm, ESPNU		at Rhode Island	W 51–48	17–2 (6–1)	15 – Smith	10 – Ziegler	4 – Ziegler	Ryan Center (1,566); Kingston, RI
January 24, 2024; 7:00 pm, ESPN+		at St. Bonaventure	W 65–40	18–2 (7–1)	20 – Smith	11 – Ziegler	4 – Ziegler	Reilly Center (193); St. Bonaventure, NY
January 27, 2024; 2:00 pm, ESPN+		Davidson	W 68–42	19–2 (8–1)	19 – Brugler	11 – Casey	3 – Nyström	Hagan Arena (917); Philadelphia, PA
January 31, 2024; 7:00 pm, ESPN+		at Loyola Chicago	W 61–50	20–2 (9–1)	15 – Smith	7 – Brugler	5 – 2 Tied	Joseph J. Gentile Arena (579); Chicago, IL
February 3, 2024; 2:00 pm, ESPN+		UMass	W 77–67	21–2 (10–1)	30 – Brugler	7 – Brugler	4 – 2 Tied	Hagan Arena (707); Philadelphia, PA
February 8, 2024; 7:00 pm, NBC Sports App		at George Mason	W 59–54	22–2 (11–1)	19 – Ziegler	14 – Ziegler	3 – Nyström	EagleBank Arena (1,540); Fairfax, VA
February 14, 2024; 7:00 pm, ESPN+		Dayton	W 73–47	23–2 (12–1)	20 – Brugler	6 – Ziegler	4 – Brugler	Hagan Arena (514); Philadelphia, PA
February 18, 2024; 2:00 pm, ESPN+		at La Salle; Big 5	W 60–29	24–2 (13–1)	16 – Brugler	10 – Ziegler	5 – Brugler	Tom Gola Arena (418); Philadelphia, PA
February 21, 2024; 6:00 pm, ESPN+		at VCU	L 48–59	24–3 (13–2)	13 – Ziegler	11 – Ziegler	5 – Ziegler	Siegel Center (423); Richmond, VA
February 24, 2024; 2:00 pm, ESPN+		Rhode Island	W 72–67	25–3 (14–2)	19 – Maurina	7 – Brugler	4 – Boslet	Hagan Arena (1,222); Philadelphia, PA
February 28, 2024; 7:00 pm, NBCSPHI/ESPN+		Fordham	L 57–62	25–4 (14–3)	24 – Smith	6 – Smith	3 – 2 Tied	Hagan Arena (734); Philadelphia, PA
March 2, 2024; 2:00 pm, ESPN+		at Duquesne	W 77–73	26–4 (15–3)	27 – Ziegler	12 – Ziegler	7 – Nyström	UPMC Cooper Fieldhouse (1,812); Pittsburgh, PA
A-10 tournament
March 8, 2024; 7:30 p.m., ESPN+	(3)	vs. (6) Rhode Island; Quarterfinals	L 47–57	26–5	12 – Ziegler	7 – Smith	5 – Smith	Henrico Sports & Events Center (2,185); Henrico, VA
WBIT
March 21, 2024*; 7:00 p.m., ESPN+	(3)	Seton Hall; First round	W 54–47	27–5	15 – Smith	8 – 3 Tied	3 – 2 Tied	Hagan Arena (540); Philadelphia, PA
March 24, 2024*; 4:00 p.m., ESPN+	(3)	at (2) California; Second round	W 63–61	28–5	19 – 2 Tied	9 – Brugler	4 – Welch	Haas Pavilion (607); Berkeley, CA
March 28, 2024*; 7:00 p.m., ESPN+	(3)	at (1) Villanova; Quarterfinals/Holy War	L 59–67	28–6	20 – Brugler	9 – Ziegler	5 – Ziegler	Finneran Pavilion (2,415); Villanova, PA
*Non-conference game. ^{#}Rankings from AP Poll. (#) Tournament seedings in parentheses. All times are in Eastern.

== Rankings ==
Ranking movements Legend: ██ Increase in ranking ██ Decrease in ranking — = Not ranked RV = Received votes
	Week																			
Poll	Pre	1	2	3	4	5	6	7	8	9	10	11	12	13	14	15	16	17	18	Final
AP	—	—	—	—	—	—	—	—	—	—	—	—	—	—	—	RV	RV	—		Not released
Coaches	—	—	—	—	—	—	—	—	—	RV	—	—	—	—	RV	RV	RV	RV		
