= 2015–16 Loyola Greyhounds women's basketball team =

Intercollegiate basketball season

2015–16 Loyola Greyhounds women's basketball
- Conference: Patriot League
- Record: 16–16 (11–7 Patriot)
- Head coach: Joe Logan (10th season)
- Assistant coaches: Sarah Jones; Jenna Loschiavo
- Home arena: Reitz Arena

2015–16 Patriot League women's basketball standings
| | Conf. | | | | Overall |
| Team | W | | L | PCT | W | | L | PCT |
|---|---|---|---|---|---|---|---|---|
| Army † | 17 | – | 1 | .944 | 29 | – | 3 | .906 |
| Bucknell | 17 | – | 1 | .944 | 25 | – | 8 | .758 |
| Loyola (MD) | 11 | – | 7 | .611 | 16 | – | 16 | .500 |
| Lehigh | 10 | – | 8 | .556 | 18 | – | 13 | .581 |
| Holy Cross | 10 | – | 8 | .556 | 13 | – | 17 | .433 |
| Navy | 9 | – | 9 | .500 | 15 | – | 15 | .500 |
| American | 5 | – | 13 | .278 | 8 | – | 23 | .258 |
| Colgate | 4 | – | 14 | .222 | 7 | – | 23 | .233 |
| Lafayette | 4 | – | 14 | .222 | 6 | – | 23 | .207 |
| Boston University | 3 | – | 15 | .167 | 3 | – | 27 | .100 |
† 2016 Patriot League tournament winner As of March 19, 2016; Rankings from AP poll

The 2015–16 Loyola Greyhounds women's basketball team represented Loyola University Maryland during the 2015–16 NCAA Division I women's basketball season. The Greyhounds, led by tenth year head coach Joe Logan, played their home games at Reitz Arena and were members of the Patriot League. They finished the season 16–16, 11–7 in Patriot League play to finish in third place. They advanced to the championship game of the Patriot League women's tournament where they lost to Army.

== Roster ==
2015–16 Loyola Greyhounds women's basketball team
Players
Coaches

| Pos. | # | Name | Height | Year | Previous school | Hometown |
|---|---|---|---|---|---|---|
| G | 3 | Abby Omdahl | 5 ft 11 in (1.8 m) | Fr | Saucon Valley | Bethlehem, PA |
| G | 5 | Colleen Marshall | 5 ft 9 in (1.75 m) | Sr | Gaithersburg | Gaithersburg, MD |
| G | 11 | Bri Betz-White | 5 ft 3 in (1.6 m) | So | Trinity | Mechanicsburg, PA |
| G | 12 | CaLee Gelbaugh | 5 ft 8 in (1.73 m) | So | Central Dauphin East | Harrisburg, PA |
| F | 13 | Ashley Hunter | 6 ft 0 in (1.83 m) | Fr | The John Carroll School | Abingdon, MD |
| G | 14 | Madelene McDonald | 5 ft 10 in (1.78 m) | So | Southern Lehigh | Coopersburg, PA |
| G | 20 | Diana Logan | 5 ft 11 in (1.8 m) | Sr | North Point | Waldorf, MD |
| F | 21 | Lauren Daugherty | 6 ft 0 in (1.83 m) | Jr | Hanover Park | Florham Park, NJ |
| G | 22 | Alex Barazotti | 5 ft 6 in (1.68 m) | Fr | Red Bank Catholic | Howell, NJ |
| G | 23 | Lisa Mirarchi | 5 ft 8 in (1.73 m) | Jr | Villa Maria Academy | West Chester, PA |
| F | 25 | Courtney Vannoy | 6 ft 1 in (1.85 m) | Fr | Blackhawk | Beaver Falls, PA |
| G/F | 30 | Maria Kilcullen | 5 ft 9 in (1.75 m) | Fr | The Episcopal Academy | Berwyn, PA |
| F | 31 | Tori Schultz | 5 ft 9 in (1.75 m) | Fr | Lampeter-Strasburg | Lancaster, PA |
| F | 32 | Steph Smith | 6 ft 0 in (1.83 m) | RS Sr | Mount St. Joseph Academy | Lower Gwynedd, PA |
| G/F | 33 | Carly Monzo | 5 ft 10 in (1.78 m) | So | Mount St. Joseph Academy | Flourtown, PA |
| F | 42 | Jeneh Perry | 5 ft 11 in (1.8 m) | Sr | Girls Preparatory School | Chattanooga, TN |

Head coach

- Joe Logan (Loyola (MD))

Assistant coach(es)

- Sarah Jones (Villanova)
- Jenna Loschiavo (Saint Joseph's)

Legend

- (C) Team captain
- (S) Suspended
- (I) Ineligible
- (W) Walk-on
- Injured
- Current redshirt

Roster

== Schedule ==
| Date time, TV | Rank^{#} | Opponent^{#} | Result | Record | Site (attendance) city, state |
Non-conference regular season
| 11/13/2015*; 7:30 pm, ESPN3 | | at Lipscomb | W 57–52 | 1–0 | Allen Arena (160); Nashville, TN |
| 11/16/2015*; 7:00 pm | | at Villanova | L 55–67 | 1–1 | The Pavilion (809); Villanova, PA |
| 11/18/2015*; 7:00 pm | | Fairfield | L 45–71 | 1–2 | Reitz Arena (334); Baltimore, MD |
| 11/21/2015*; 4:00 pm | | Norfolk State | W 75–67 | 2–2 | Reitz Arena (307); Baltimore, MD |
| 11/23/2015*; 7:00 pm | | William & Mary | L 61–62 | 2–3 | Reitz Arena (253); Baltimore, MD |
| 11/28/2015*; 2:00 pm | | at Columbia | L 53–63 | 2–4 | Levien Gymnasium (417); New York City, NY |
| 12/02/2015*; 11:00 am | | at Old Dominion | L 41–64 | 2–5 | Ted Constant Convocation Center (8,472); Norfolk, VA |
| 12/05/2015*; 4:30 pm | | at Mount St. Mary's | W 65–63 | 3–5 | Knott Arena (415); Emmitsburg, MD |
| 12/08/2015*; 7:00 pm | | at No. 5 Maryland | L 47–97 | 3–6 | Xfinity Center (3,368); College Park, MD |
| 12/20/2015*; 12:00 pm | | UMBC | L 46–52 | 3–7 | Reitz Arena (258); Baltimore, MD |
| 12/22/2015*; 1:00 pm | | at St. Francis Brooklyn | L 54–64 | 3–8 | Generoso Pope Athletic Complex (150); Brooklyn, NY |
Patriot League regular season
| 12/30/2015; 4:30 pm | | American | W 52–46 | 4–8 (1–0) | Reitz Arena (787); Baltimore, MD |
| 01/02/2016; 2:00 pm | | Lafayette | W 66–65 | 5–8 (2–0) | Reitz Arena (226); Baltimore, MD |
| 01/06/2016; 7:00 pm | | at Lehigh | L 48–66 | 5–9 (2–1) | Stabler Arena (639); Bethlehem, PA |
| 01/09/2016; 1:00 pm | | at Army | L 37–70 | 5–10 (2–2) | Christl Arena (1,198); West Point, NY |
| 01/13/2016; 7:00 pm | | Navy | W 51–38 | 6–10 (3–2) | Reitz Arena (167); Baltimore, MD |
| 01/16/2016; 2:00 pm | | Boston University | W 63–54 | 7–10 (4–2) | Reitz Arena (327); Baltimore, MD |
| 01/20/2016; 7:00 pm | | at Bucknell | L 64–71 | 7–11 (4–3) | Sojka Pavilion (454); Lewisburg, PA |
| 01/23/2016; 4:00 pm | | at Colgate | W 65–49 | 8–11 (5–3) | Cotterell Court (512); Hamilton, NY |
| 01/30/2016; 2:00 pm | | at Lafayette | W 55–51 | 9–11 (6–3) | Kirby Sports Center (871); Easton, PA |
| 02/03/2016; 7:00 pm | | Lehigh | L 68–76 | 9–12 (6–4) | Reitz Arena (293); Baltimore, MD |
| 02/06/2016; 2:00 pm | | Army | L 44–52 | 9–13 (6–5) | Reitz Arena (348); Baltimore, MD |
| 02/10/2016; 7:00 pm | | at Navy | L 38–45 | 9–14 (6–6) | Alumni Hall (1,128); Annapolis, MD |
| 02/13/2016; 2:00 pm | | at Boston University | W 67–46 | 10–14 (7–6) | Case Gym (280); Boston, MA |
| 02/17/2016; 7:00 pm | | Bucknell | L 42–64 | 10–15 (7–7) | Reitz Arena (514); Baltimore, MD |
| 02/21/2016; 2:00 pm | | Colgate | W 55–38 | 11–15 (8–7) | Reitz Arena (1,236); Baltimore, MD |
| 02/24/2016; 7:00 pm | | at Holy Cross | W 59–49 | 12–15 (9–7) | Hart Center (1,011); Worcester, MA |
| 02/27/2016; 4:00 pm | | at American | W 55–50 | 13–15 (10–7) | Bender Arena (316); Washington, D.C. |
| 03/02/2016; 7:00 pm | | Holy Cross | W 58–45 | 14–15 (11–7) | Reitz Arena (317); Baltimore, MD |
Patriot League Women's Tournament
| 03/07/2016; 7:00 pm | | Navy; Quarterfinals | W 44–42 | 15–15 | Reitz Arena (532); Baltimore, MD |
| 03/11/2016; 7:30 pm | | at Bucknell; Semifinals | W 65–53 | 16–15 | Sojka Pavilion (768); Lewisburg, PA |
| 03/12/2016; 6:00 pm, CBSSN | | at Army; Championship Game | L 51–65 | 16–16 | Christl Arena (1,121); West Point, NY |
*Non-conference game. ^{#}Rankings from AP Poll. (#) Tournament seedings in parentheses. All times are in Eastern Time.

== See also ==
- 2015–16 Loyola Greyhounds men's basketball team
