= Loyola Greyhounds basketball =

Loyola Greyhounds basketball may refer to either of the basketball teams that represent the Loyola University Maryland:

- Loyola Greyhounds men's basketball
- Loyola Greyhounds women's basketball
