= Saint Joseph's Hawks basketball =

Saint Joseph's Hawks basketball may refer to either of the basketball teams that represent Saint Joseph's University:

- Saint Joseph's Hawks men's basketball
- Saint Joseph's Hawks women's basketball
