= 2015–16 Army Black Knights women's basketball team =

Intercollegiate basketball season

2015–16 Army Black Knights women's basketball

Patriot League Regular Season co-champions & Tournament Champions

NCAA Women's Tournament, first round
- Conference: Patriot League
- Record: 29–3 (17–1 Patriot)
- Head coach: Dave Magarity (10th season)
- Assistant coaches: Colleen Mullen; Emily Garner; Jenna McLaughlin
- Home arena: Christl Arena

2015–16 Patriot League women's basketball standings
	Conf.				Overall
Team	W		L	PCT	W		L	PCT
Army †	17	–	1	.944	29	–	3	.906
Bucknell	17	–	1	.944	25	–	8	.758
Loyola (MD)	11	–	7	.611	16	–	16	.500
Lehigh	10	–	8	.556	18	–	13	.581
Holy Cross	10	–	8	.556	13	–	17	.433
Navy	9	–	9	.500	15	–	15	.500
American	5	–	13	.278	8	–	23	.258
Colgate	4	–	14	.222	7	–	23	.233
Lafayette	4	–	14	.222	6	–	23	.207
Boston University	3	–	15	.167	3	–	27	.100
† 2016 Patriot League tournament winner As of March 19, 2016; Rankings from AP poll

The 2015–16 Army Black Knights women's basketball team represented the United States Military Academy during the 2015–16 NCAA Division I women's basketball season. The Black Knights, led by tenth year head coach Dave Magarity, played their home games at Christl Arena and were members of the Patriot League. They finished the season 29–3, 17–1 in Patriot League play to share the Patriot League regular season title with Bucknell. They won the Patriot League women's tournament to earn an automatic trip to the NCAA women's tournament where they lost to Syracuse in the first round.

== Roster ==
2015–16 Army Black Knights women's basketball team
Players
Coaches

Pos.	#	Name	Height	Year	Previous school	Hometown
G	1	Gabby Purnell	5 ft 5 in (1.65 m)	Fr	Mesa Ridge; USMAPS	Colorado Springs, CO
G	2	Brigette Ocran	5 ft 6 in (1.68 m)	Sr	Paint Branch	Burtonsville, MD
G	3	Jess Lewis	5 ft 9 in (1.75 m)	Fr	Regis Jesuit	Denver, CO
F	4	Margaret Anne Hubbell	5 ft 9 in (1.75 m)	So	Germantown Academy	Doylestown, PA
G	5	Kelsey Minato	5 ft 8 in (1.73 m)	Sr	Huntington Beach	Huntington Beach, CA
G	10	Aliyah Murray	5 ft 10 in (1.78 m)	So	Delran; USMAPS	Delran, NJ
G	11	Ellen Dougherty	5 ft 6 in (1.68 m)	Fr	Academy of Law and Public Safety; USMAPS	Wall, NJ
G	12	Izzy McMahon	5 ft 2 in (1.57 m)	Fr	Saddle River Day School; USMAPS	Bardonia, NY
F/C	13	Lena' Hicks	6 ft 4 in (1.93 m)	So	Elkton; USMAPS	Charlotte, NC
F	14	Madison Hovren	5 ft 11 in (1.8 m)	Fr	Central Valley	Spokane, WA
G	20	Destinee Morris	5 ft 7 in (1.7 m)	So	Centennial	Lino Lakes, MN
G	21	Janae McNeal	5 ft 9 in (1.75 m)	So	Courtland; USMAPS	Spotsylvania, VA
G	23	Daizjah Morris	5 ft 7 in (1.7 m)	So	Centennial	Lino Lakes, MN
G/F	24	Jean Parker	5 ft 9 in (1.75 m)	Sr	Jesuit	Portland, OR
F/C	33	Aimee Oertner	6 ft 2 in (1.88 m)	Sr	Northern Lehigh	Slatington, PA
F/C	35	Dani Failor	6 ft 1 in (1.85 m)	Jr	Post Falls	Post Falls, ID
G/F	41	Brianna Johnson	5 ft 10 in (1.78 m)	Sr	Etiwanda	Fontana, CA
F	42	Alex Elzinga	5 ft 11 in (1.8 m)	Jr	Adlai E. Stevenson	Long Grove, IL

Head coach

- Dave Magarity (Saint Francis (PA))

Assistant coach(es)

- Colleen Mullen (New Hampshire)
- Emily Garner (Lafayette)
- Jenna McLaughlin (Molloy)

Legend

- (C) Team captain
- (S) Suspended
- (I) Ineligible
- (W) Walk-on
- Injured
- Current redshirt

Roster

== Schedule ==
Date time, TV	Rank^{#}	Opponent^{#}	Result	Record	Site (attendance) city, state
Non-conference regular season
11/13/2015*; 7:00 pm		Pepperdine	W 63–53	1–0	Christl Arena (993); West Point, NY
11/15/2015*; 4:00 pm		Quinnipiac	W 67–57	2–0	Christl Arena (456); West Point, NY
11/19/2015*; 5:00 pm		Central Connecticut	W 81–52	3–0	Christl Arena (415); West Point, NY
11/22/2015*; 2:00 pm		at No. 14 Duke	L 61–72	3–1	Cameron Indoor Stadium (6,147); Durham, NC
11/29/2015*; 1:00 pm		Rider	W 57–42	4–1	Christl Arena (513); West Point, NY
12/03/2015*; 7:00 pm, ESPN3		at Yale	W 65–51	5–1	John J. Lee Amphitheater; New Haven, CT
12/05/2015*; 3:00 pm		Albany	W 65–62	6–1	Christl Arena (754); West Point, NY
12/08/2015*; 7:00 pm		at St. Francis Brooklyn	W 74–35	7–1	Generoso Pope Athletic Complex (200); Brooklyn, NY
12/11/2015*; 7:00 pm		at NJIT	W 71–35	8–1	Fleisher Center (423); Newark, NJ
12/19/2015*; 1:00 pm		Emerson	W 86–47	9–1	Christl Arena (516); West Point, NY
Patriot League regular season
12/30/2015; 7:00 pm		Lehigh	W 63–39	10–1 (1–0)	Christl Arena (906); West Point, NY
01/02/2016; 2:00 pm		at Bucknell	L 69–79	10–2 (1–1)	Sojka Pavilion (507); Lewisburg, PA
01/06/2016; 7:00 pm		at Lafayette	W 78–45	11–2 (2–1)	Kirby Sports Center (377); Easton, PA
01/09/2016; 7:00 pm		Loyola (MD)	W 70–37	12–2 (3–1)	Christl Arena (1,198); West Point, NY
01/13/2016; 7:00 pm		Colgate	W 67–55	13–2 (4–1)	Christl Arena (628); West Point, NY
01/16/2016; 2:00 pm		at American	W 52–42	14–2 (5–1)	Bender Arena (607); Washington, D.C.
01/20/2016; 7:00 pm		Holy Cross	W 77–58	15–2 (6–1)	Christl Arena (811); West Point, NY
01/23/2016; 11:30 am, CBSSN		vs. Navy	W 75–38	16–2 (7–1)	Madison Square Garden (1,045); New York City, NY
01/30/2016; 1:00 pm		Bucknell	W 68–63	17–2 (8–1)	Christl Arena (1,185); West Point, NY
02/03/2016; 7:00 pm		Lafayette	W 84–57	18–2 (9–1)	Christl Arena (648); West Point, NY
02/06/2016; 7:00 pm		at Loyola (MD)	W 52–44	19–2 (10–1)	Reitz Arena (348); Baltimore, MD
02/10/2016; 7:00 pm		at Colgate	W 78–55	20–2 (11–1)	Cotterell Court (481); Hamilton, NY
02/13/2016; 3:00 pm		American	W 87–51	21–2 (12–1)	Christl Arena (937); West Point, NY
02/17/2016; 7:00 pm		at Holy Cross	W 80–49	22–2 (13–1)	Hart Center (1,456); Worcester, MA
02/20/2016; 11:00 am, CBSSN		at Navy	W 49–34	23–2 (14–1)	Alumni Hall (5,510); Annapolis, MD
02/24/2016; 7:00 pm		Boston University	W 72–38	24–2 (15–1)	Christl Arena (749); West Point, NY
02/27/2016; 7:30 pm		at Lehigh	W 69–49	25–2 (16–1)	Stabler Arena (1,198); Bethlehem, PA
03/02/2016; 7:00 pm		at Boston University	W 79–44	26–2 (17–1)	Case Gym (224); Boston, MA
Patriot League Women's Tournament
03/07/2016; 7:30 pm		Colgate; Quarterfinals	W 89–62	27–2	Christl Arena (641); West Point, NY
03/11/2016; 5:00 pm		Lehigh; Semifinals	W 76–46	28–2	Christl Arena; West Point, NY
03/12/2016; 6:00 pm, CBSSN		Loyola (MD); Championship Game	W 69–51	29–2	Christl Arena (1,121); West Point, NY
NCAA Women's Tournament
03/18/2016*; 11:30 am, ESPN2	(13 SF)	at (4 SF) No. 12 Syracuse; First round	L 56–73	29–3	Carrier Dome (2,445); Syracuse, NY
*Non-conference game. ^{#}Rankings from AP Poll. (#) Tournament seedings in parentheses. SF=Sioux Falls Region. All times are in Eastern Time.

== Rankings ==
2015–16 NCAA Division I women's basketball rankings

Regular season polls
Poll	Pre- Season	Week 2	Week 3	Week 4	Week 5	Week 6	Week 7	Week 8	Week 9	Week 10	Week 11	Week 12	Week 13	Week 14	Week 15	Week 16	Week 17	Week 18	Week 19	Final
AP	NR	NR	NR	NR	NR	NR	NR	NR	NR	NR	NR	NR	NR	NR	RV	NR	RV	RV	RV	N/A
Coaches	NR	NR	RV	NR	RV	RV	RV	RV	NR	NR	NR	NR	NR	NR	NR	NR	NR	NR	NR	NR

Legend
	Increase in ranking
	Decrease in ranking
	Not ranked previous week
(RV)	Received Votes

== See also ==
2015–16 Army Black Knights men's basketball team
