= 2015–16 Navy Midshipmen women's basketball team =

Intercollegiate basketball season

2015–16 Navy Midshipmen women's basketball
- Conference: Patriot League
- Record: 15–15 (9–9 Patriot)
- Head coach: Stefanie Pemper (8th season)
- Assistant coaches: Jody Burrows; Jimmy Colloton; Ashley Langford; Rebecca Tillett
- Home arena: Alumni Hall

2015–16 Patriot League women's basketball standings
	Conf.				Overall
Team	W		L	PCT	W		L	PCT
Army †	17	–	1	.944	29	–	3	.906
Bucknell	17	–	1	.944	25	–	8	.758
Loyola (MD)	11	–	7	.611	16	–	16	.500
Lehigh	10	–	8	.556	18	–	13	.581
Holy Cross	10	–	8	.556	13	–	17	.433
Navy	9	–	9	.500	15	–	15	.500
American	5	–	13	.278	8	–	23	.258
Colgate	4	–	14	.222	7	–	23	.233
Lafayette	4	–	14	.222	6	–	23	.207
Boston University	3	–	15	.167	3	–	27	.100
† 2016 Patriot League tournament winner As of March 19, 2016; Rankings from AP poll

The 2015–16 Navy Midshipmen women's basketball team represented the United States Naval Academy during the 2015–16 NCAA Division I women's basketball season. The Midshipmen, led by eighth year head coach Stefanie Pemper, played their home games at Alumni Hall and are members of the Patriot League. They finished the season 15–15, 9–9 in Patriot League play to finish in sixth place. They lost in the quarterfinals of the Patriot League women's tournament to Loyola (MD).

== Roster ==
2015–16 Navy Midshipmen women's basketball team
Players
Coaches

Pos.	#	Name	Height	Year	Previous school	Hometown
G	1	Taylor Durham	5 ft 4 in (1.63 m)	So	Mount Vernon	Fort Belvoir, VA
G	2	Sara Jones	5 ft 9 in (1.75 m)	Jr	Northwestern Lehigh	New Tripoli, PA
G	3	Christina Potts	5 ft 7 in (1.7 m)	Fr	Timber Creek	Orlando, FL
G	4	Danielle Poblarp	5 ft 3 in (1.6 m)	Jr	Shawnee Heights	Topeka, KS
G	5	Sarita Condie	5 ft 7 in (1.7 m)	Jr	Pershing County	Lovelock, NV
G	12	Peri Curtis	5 ft 7 in (1.7 m)	Jr	Coronado	Coronado, CO
G	13	Hannah Fenske	5 ft 8 in (1.73 m)	So	Volcano Vista	Albuquerque, NM
F	14	Makeba Ndifang	5 ft 11 in (1.8 m)	So	South Carroll	Boonsboro, MD
G	15	Bianca Roach	5 ft 7 in (1.7 m)	Fr	Cape Henry Collegiate	Virginia Beach, VA
G	21	Justice Swett	5 ft 8 in (1.73 m)	Jr	Ensworth	Nashville, TN
F	22	Sarah Reilly	5 ft 10 in (1.78 m)	So	Ursuline Academy	Cincinnati, OH
G	23	Molly Sanders	5 ft 7 in (1.7 m)	Fr	Ames	Ames, IA
G	24	Tyra Hughes	5 ft 6 in (1.68 m)	Fr	Walkersville	Walkersville, MD
F	25	Ashanti Kennedy	5 ft 8 in (1.73 m)	Jr	Cape Henry Collegiate	Virginia Beach, VA
F	33	Marina Muenster	6 ft 2 in (1.88 m)	So	Prestonwood Christian	Coppell, TX
C	41	Peyton Winters	6 ft 2 in (1.88 m)	Fr	Downers Grove	Downers Grove, IL
F	55	Haley Unger	5 ft 11 in (1.8 m)	So	Marlboro	Marlboro, NJ

Head coach

- Stefanie Pemper (Idaho State)

Assistant coach(es)

- Jody Burrows (Northeastern)
- Jimmy Colloton (Wittenberg)
- Ashley Langford (Tulane)
- Rebecca Tillett (William & Mary)

Legend

- (C) Team captain
- (S) Suspended
- (I) Ineligible
- (W) Walk-on
- Injured
- Current redshirt

Roster

== Schedule ==
Date time, TV	Rank^{#}	Opponent^{#}	Result	Record	Site (attendance) city, state
Non-conference regular season
11/13/2015*; 5:00 pm		at Hofstra	L 63–65	0–1	Hofstra Arena; Hempstead, NY
11/15/2015*; 2:00 pm		at Saint Peter's	W 50–39	1–1	Yanitelli Center (231); Jersey City, NJ
11/22/2015*; 3:00 pm		North Carolina A&T	W 52–48	2–1	Alumni Hall (1,037); Annapolis, MD
11/24/2015*; 7:00 pm		Elon	W 73–70 ^{2OT}	3–1	Alumni Hall (347); Annapolis, MD
11/27/2015*; 6:00 pm		Siena; Navy Classic semifinals	W 59–58 ^{OT}	4–1	Alumni Hall (607); Annapolis, MD
11/28/2015*; 6:00 pm		Colorado State; Navy Classic championship	L 73–82 ^{2OT}	4–2	Alumni Hall (317); Annapolis, MD
12/02/2015*; 7:00 pm		LIU Brooklyn	L 66–68 ^{OT}	4–3	Alumni Hall (383); Annapolis, MD
12/05/2015*; 2:00 pm, ESPN3		at Penn	L 43–57	4–4	The Palestra (387); Philadelphia, PA
12/08/2015*; 7:00 pm		Johns Hopkins	W 77–45	5–4	Alumni Hall (310); Annapolis, MD
12/13/2015*; 2:00 pm, ESPN3		at Kansas	L 54–61 ^{OT}	5–5	Allen Fieldhouse (2,032); Lawrence, KS
12/21/2015*; 7:00 pm		Air Force	W 64–46	6–5	Alumni Hall (776); Annapolis, MD
Patriot League regular season
12/30/2015; 7:00 pm		Bucknell	L 41–51	6–6 (0–1)	Alumni Hall (578); Annapolis, MD
01/02/2016; 1:00 pm		at Holy Cross	L 49–57	6–7 (0–2)	Hart Center (987); Worcester, MA
01/07/2016; 7:00 pm		Boston University	W 67–56	7–7 (1–2)	Alumni Hall (495); Annapolis, MD
01/09/2016; 4:00 pm		Colgate	W 51–41	8–7 (2–2)	Alumni Hall (657); Annapolis, MD
01/13/2016; 7:00 pm		at Loyola (MD)	L 38–51	8–8 (2–3)	Reitz Arena (167); Baltimore, MD
01/16/2016; 2:00 pm		at Lafayette	W 65–58 ^{OT}	9–8 (3–3)	Kirby Sports Center (449); Easton, PA
01/20/2016; 7:00 pm		Lehigh	L 48–51	9–9 (3–4)	Alumni Hall (1,271); Annapolis, MD
01/23/2016; 11:30 am, CBSSN		vs. Army	L 38–75	9–10 (3–5)	Madison Square Garden (1,045); New York City, NY
01/30/2016; 4:00 pm		Holy Cross	W 50–49	10–10 (4–5)	Alumni Hall (1,017); Annapolis, MD
02/04/2016; 7:00 pm		at Boston University	L 49–51	10–11 (4–6)	Case Gym (411); Boston, MA
02/06/2016; 4:00 pm		at Colgate	W 62–58	11–11 (5–6)	Cotterell Court (925); Hamilton, NY
02/10/2016; 7:00 pm		Loyola (MD)	W 45–38	12–11 (6–6)	Alumni Hall (1,128); Annapolis, MD
02/13/2016; 7:00 pm		Lafayette	W 64–49	13–11 (7–6)	Alumni Hall (867); Annapolis, MD
02/17/2016; 7:00 pm		at Lehigh	W 62–54	14–11 (8–6)	Stabler Arena (761); Bethlehem, PA
02/20/2016; 11:00 am, CBSSN		Army	L 34–49	14–12 (8–7)	Alumni Hall (5,510); Annapolis, MD
02/24/2016; 7:00 pm		American	W 65–52	15–12 (9–7)	Alumni Hall (1,015); Annapolis, MD
02/27/2016; 7:00 pm		at Bucknell	L 52–64	15–13 (9–8)	Sojka Pavilion (716); Lewisburg, PA
03/02/2016; 7:00 pm		at American	L 56–61	15–14 (9–9)	Bender Arena (183); Washington, D.C.
Patriot League Women's Tournament
03/07/2016; 7:00 pm		at Loyola (MD); Quarterfinals	L 42–44	15–15	Reitz Arena (532); Baltimore, MD
*Non-conference game. ^{#}Rankings from AP Poll. (#) Tournament seedings in parentheses. All times are in Eastern Time.

== See also ==
2015–16 Navy Midshipmen men's basketball team
