= Susan Moran (basketball) =

Irish former women's basketball player

Personal information
- Born: 17 January 1980 (age 46) Ireland
- Listed height: 6 ft 1 in (1.85 m)

Career information
- High school: Sacred Heart School (Tullamore, County Offaly, Ireland)
- College: Saint Joseph's (1998–2002)
- Position: Forward

Career history

Coaching
- 2003–2012: Saint Joseph's (assistant)
- 2012–2018: Saint Joseph's (associate HC)

Career highlights
- Atlantic 10 Player of the Year (2002); Basketball Ireland Hall of Fame (2019)

Susan Maria Moran (born January 1980) is a former Irish basketball player. As of 2015, she was a coach with the Saint Joseph's Hawks women's basketball team. Moran, who was inducted into the Philadelphia Big 5 and Basketball Ireland "halls of fame" in 2009 and 2019 respectively, has been described by John Riordan of the Irish Examiner as "probably the greatest female basketballer Ireland has produced".

== Early life and education ==
Originally from Kilbeggan, County Westmeath in Ireland, her father was a member of the Westmeath county football team in the 1960s. Later moving to Tullamore, County Offaly, Susan Moran attended Sacred Heart Secondary School in Tullamore, and led the school's basketball team to the national Under 19 School's Cup. In the 1998 finals, she scored a game-high of 52 points.

== College career ==
Having been scouted by several US colleges, Moran was recruited in 1998 by St. Joseph's Philadelphia for their Division 1 NCAA basketball programme. In January 1999, she scored a career-high of 26 points for St. Joseph's in an NCAA game against the George Washington Revolutionaries.

During her four years at St. Joseph's, she led the team in both scoring and rebounding every year. In her final year, she was the fourth-highest scorer nationally within US college basketball, averaging 22.3 points.

By the time of her departure from St. Joseph's, in 2002, Moran was the "all-time leading scorer" at the college. St. Joseph's subsequently "retired" her jersey number. Having previously been named "Atlantic 10 Conference Player of the Year", she was inducted into the Philadelphia Big 5 "hall of fame" in 2009 and the St. Joseph's University "athletic hall of fame" in 2010.

== Professional career ==
In 2002, Moran signed a free agent contract with New York Liberty in the Women's National Basketball Association (WNBA), and was placed on injured-reserve list. This made her the first (and as of 2025 the only) Irish-born player contracted by a WNBA team.

Moran subsequently played professionally in basketball leagues in Spain, Australia and New Zealand. In the latter two, she won each league's Most Valuable Player (MVP) award.

== International career ==
Moran made her senior debut for the Ireland women's national basketball team at the age of 16. She played internationally in several competitions, including the World Student Games.

In 2019, Susan Moran was entered as a member of Basketball Ireland's Hall of Fame. Together with Siobhán Caffrey, Moran was one of the first two women inducted into the Hall of Fame.

== Coaching career ==
As of 2015, Moran was an associate head coach at St. Joseph's Philadelphia, having been promoted to the role in 2012. Later known by her married name, Susan Lavin, she became director of player development at Saint Joseph's Philadelphia in 2019.
