= 2015–16 Boston University Terriers women's basketball team =

Intercollegiate basketball season

2015–16 Boston University Terriers women's basketball
- Conference: Patriot League
- Record: 3–27 (3–15 Patriot)
- Head coach: Katy Steding (2nd season)
- Assistant coaches: Cindy Blodgett; Stephanie Tobey; Tiffany Sardin
- Home arena: Case Gym

2015–16 Patriot League women's basketball standings
	Conf.				Overall
Team	W		L	PCT	W		L	PCT
Army †	17	–	1	.944	29	–	3	.906
Bucknell	17	–	1	.944	25	–	8	.758
Loyola (MD)	11	–	7	.611	16	–	16	.500
Lehigh	10	–	8	.556	18	–	13	.581
Holy Cross	10	–	8	.556	13	–	17	.433
Navy	9	–	9	.500	15	–	15	.500
American	5	–	13	.278	8	–	23	.258
Colgate	4	–	14	.222	7	–	23	.233
Lafayette	4	–	14	.222	6	–	23	.207
Boston University	3	–	15	.167	3	–	27	.100
† 2016 Patriot League tournament winner As of March 19, 2016; Rankings from AP poll

The 2015–16 Boston University Terriers women's basketball team represented Boston University during the 2015–16 NCAA Division I women's basketball season. The Terries, led by second year head coach Katy Steding, played their home games at Case Gym and are members of the Patriot League. They finished the season 3–27, 3–15 in Patriot League play to finish in last place. They lost in the first round of the Patriot League women's tournament to American.

== Roster ==
2015–16 Boston University Terriers women's basketball team
Players
Coaches

Pos.	#	Name	Height	Year	Previous school	Hometown
C	1	Sophie Beaudry (I) (redshirt)	6 ft 5 in (1.96 m)	Jr	Dawson College; Monmouth	Chambly, QE
G	2	Clodagh Scannell	5 ft 10 in (1.78 m)	Sr	GaelCholiste Mhiure A.G	Cork, Ireland
F	3	Naiyah Thompson	5 ft 11 in (1.8 m)	Fr	St. Mary's Ryken	Leonard, MD
G	4	Payton Hauck	5 ft 9 in (1.75 m)	Fr	Northeastern	York, PA
G	11	Meghan Doogan	5 ft 9 in (1.75 m)	So	Concord	Claymont, DE
G	12	Sarah Hope	5 ft 7 in (1.7 m)	Jr	Medway	Medway, MA
C	13	Milla Ekstrom	6 ft 5 in (1.96 m)	Fr	Turku's Classic High School	Turku, Finland
G	14	Courtney Latham	5 ft 8 in (1.73 m)	Jr	Glastonbury	Glastonbury, CT
G	21	Lauren Spearman	5 ft 7 in (1.7 m)	Fr	Marlborough School	Los Angeles, CA
G	22	Corrine Williams	6 ft 1 in (1.85 m)	So	Bloomfield	Bloomfield, CT
G	23	Troi Melton	5 ft 11 in (1.8 m)	RS Sr	Cardinal Spellman	Bronx, NY
F	33	Meghan Green	6 ft 0 in (1.83 m)	Jr	Bishop Guetrin	Bedford, NH
F	34	Erin Bayram	6 ft 2 in (1.88 m)	So	Batavia	Batavia, IL
F	52	Kara Sheftic	6 ft 1 in (1.85 m)	So	Essex	Essex Junction, VT

Head coach

- Katy Steding (Stanford)

Assistant coach(es)

- Cindy Blodgett (Maine)
- Stephanie Tobey (Bryant)
- Tiffany Sardin (Virginia)

Legend

- (C) Team captain
- (S) Suspended
- (I) Ineligible
- (W) Walk-on
- Injured
- Current redshirt

Roster

== Schedule ==
Date time, TV	Rank^{#}	Opponent^{#}	Result	Record	Site (attendance) city, state
Non-conference regular season
11/13/2015*; 12:00 pm, butv 10		Northeastern	L 44–77	0–1	Case Gym (993); Boston, MA
11/18/2015*; 7:00 pm, butv 10		Albany	L 43–83	0–2	Case Gym (231); Boston, MA
11/21/2015*; 1:00 pm, butv 10		Boston College; Green Line Rivalry	L 37–58	0–3	Case Gym (351); Boston, MA
11/24/2015*; 7:00 pm		at Harvard	L 55–73	0–4	Lavietes Pavilion (379); Cambridge, MA
11/28/2015*; 2:00 pm		at Dartmouth	L 52–72	0–5	Leede Arena (695); Hanover, NH
12/01/2015*; 7:00 pm		at UMass Lowell	L 57–70	0–6	Tsongas Center (515); Lowell, MA
12/05/2015*; 4:00 pm		at New Hampshire	L 52–69	0–7	Lundholm Gym (260); Durham, NE
12/09/2015*; 7:00 pm, butv 10		Rhode Island	L 41–57	0–8	Case Gym (218); Boston, MA
12/12/2015*; 2:00 pm, butv 10		Marist	L 54–73	0–9	Case Gym (280); Boston, MA
12/19/2015*; 6:00 pm		at Massachusetts	L 56–73	0–10	Mullins Center (418); Amherst, MA
12/28/2015*; 1:00 pm, butv 10		Vermont	L 45–60	0–11	Case Gym; Boston, MA
Patriot League regular season
12/30/2015; 1:00 pm, butv 10		Holy Cross	L 41–60	0–12 (0–1)	Case Gym (172); Boston, MA
01/02/2016; 2:00 pm, butv 10		Lehigh	L 66–73	0–13 (0–2)	Case Gym (201); Boston, MA
01/07/2016; 7:00 pm, PLN		at Navy	L 56–67	0–14 (0–3)	Alumni Hall (495); Annapolis, MD
01/09/2016; 2:00 pm, PLN		at Lafayette	L 56–71	0–15 (0–4)	Kirby Sports Center (297); Easton, PA
01/13/2016; 7:00 pm, butv 10		American	W 63–59	1–15 (1–4)	Case Gym (159); Boston, MA
01/16/2016; 2:00 pm, PLN		at Loyola (MD)	L 54–63	1–16 (1–5)	Reitz Arena (327); Baltimore, MD
01/20/2016; 7:00 pm, butv 10		Colgate	L 63–72	1–17 (1–6)	Case Gym (231); Boston, MA
01/23/2016; 4:00 pm, PLN		at Bucknell	L 56–74	1–18 (1–7)	Sojka Pavilion (415); Lewisburg, PA
01/30/2016; 2:00 pm, PLN		at Lehigh	L 48–72	1–19 (1–8)	Stabler Arena (920); Bethlehem, PA
02/04/2016; 7:00 pm, butv 10		Navy	W 51–49	2–19 (2–8)	Case Gym (411); Boston, MA
02/06/2016; 2:00 pm, butv 10		Lafayette	L 64–71	2–20 (2–9)	Case Gym (253); Boston, MA
02/10/2016; 7:00 pm, PLN		at American	L 33–79	2–21 (2–10)	Bender Arena; Washington, D.C.
02/13/2016; 2:00 pm, butv 10		Loyola (MD)	L 46–67	2–22 (2–11)	Case Gym (280); Boston, MA
02/17/2016; 7:00 pm, PLN		at Colgate	W 71–58	3–22 (3–11)	Cotterell Court (691); Hamilton, NY
02/20/2016; 2:00 pm, butv 10		Bucknell	L 59–72	3–23 (3–12)	Case Gym (256); Boston, MA
02/24/2016; 7:00 pm, PLN		at Army	L 38–72	3–24 (3–13)	Christl Arena (749); West Point, NY
02/27/2016; 2:00 pm, PLN		at Holy Cross	L 50–74	3–25 (3–14)	Hart Center (1,385); Worcester, MA
03/02/2016; 7:00 pm, butv 10		Army	L 44–79	3–26 (3–15)	Case Gym (224); Boston, MA
Patriot League Women's Tournament
03/05/2016; 2:00 pm, PLN		at American; First Round	L 53–61	3–27	Bender Arena (177); Washington, D.C.
*Non-conference game. ^{#}Rankings from AP Poll. (#) Tournament seedings in parentheses. All times are in Eastern Time.

== See also ==
2015–16 Boston University Terriers men's basketball team
