= Joe Logan =

American basketball coach

Biographical details
- Born: January 28, 1974 (age 52); Philadelphia, Pennsylvania
- Education: Loyola (MD)

Coaching career (HC unless noted)
- 1996–1997: Centenary (NJ) (assistant)
- 1997–2001: Loyola (MD) (assistant)
- 2001–2005: Saint Joseph's (assistant)
- 2005–2021: Loyola (MD)

Head coaching record
- Overall: 184–287

Accomplishments and honors

Awards
- 2007 Anaconda Sports MAAC Coach of the Year

Joe Logan (born January 28, 1974) is the former head coach of the Loyola University Maryland women's basketball team, an NCAA Division I program that competes in the Patriot League. Logan was named head coach at Loyola on May 12, 2005, after spending the previous four seasons (2001–2005) as a women's basketball assistant coach at St. Joseph's University in Philadelphia.

Logan, a 1996 graduate of Loyola, was also an assistant coach at Loyola from 1997 to 2001 under Pat Coyle and Cindy Griffin. Following his graduation, Logan spent a season as a men's basketball assistant coach at Centenary College, an NCAA Division III school in Hackettstown, New Jersey.

During his time as a student at Loyola, Logan was a manager for both the men's and women's basketball teams. He was with each team when they advanced to the NCAA Tournaments (men, 1994; women, 1995) and served under former Loyola coaches Skip Prosser and Coyle.

Logan returned to Loyola to help rebuild the Greyhounds. In 2005–2006, the Greyhounds compiled a 20–10 record, the most victories by a first-year head coach in school history. Loyola advanced to the MAAC Championship Game that year before losing to Marist.

The 2006–2007 Greyhounds put together an 18–12 mark and moved on to the MAAC Semifinals despite being projected to finish seventh in the conference prior to the season. Logan was named the Anaconda Sports/MAAC Coach of the Year following that season.

Following the graduation of eight players over two years, the Greyhounds entered a bit of a rebuilding process in 2007–2008. Logan, however, helped the team jump out to a 7–2 record before finishing the season 13–17 in the MAAC Quarterfinals. In 2008–2009, the Greyhounds finished 10–20.

Logan led the Greyhounds to arguably the most successful season in program history in 2010–11, tying the record for most wins in a single season with 21, and setting the mark for most conference wins with 15. Loyola finished 21–13 overall and 15–3 in the MAAC to finish second in the regular season.

During the 2010–11 campaign, Loyola won nine-straight games, tying the record for the longest winning streak in program history. The Greyhounds went on to the MAAC title game for the seventh time in school history, where they fell to Marist.

Loyola qualified for the 2011 Women's National Invitation Tournament, where they picked up the program's first-ever postseason win, knocking off Old Dominion 67–65 on the road.

During the 2011–12 season, Logan reached a pair of career milestones. First, he won his 100th career game with a win over George Washington, becoming just the second head women's basketball coach at Loyola to accomplish the feat. Logan then became the all-time wins leader as coach in Greyhound history on January 7, 2012, recording his 101st career win over Siena.

Loyola went on to finish fourth in the MAAC during 2011–12, going 13–17 overall and 9–9 in the MAAC.

Logan is married to former Loyola women's basketball player and assistant coach, Susan Bryce. They have three children Margaret, Rose, and Joseph.
