= Cindy Griffin =

American college basketball coach (born 1969)

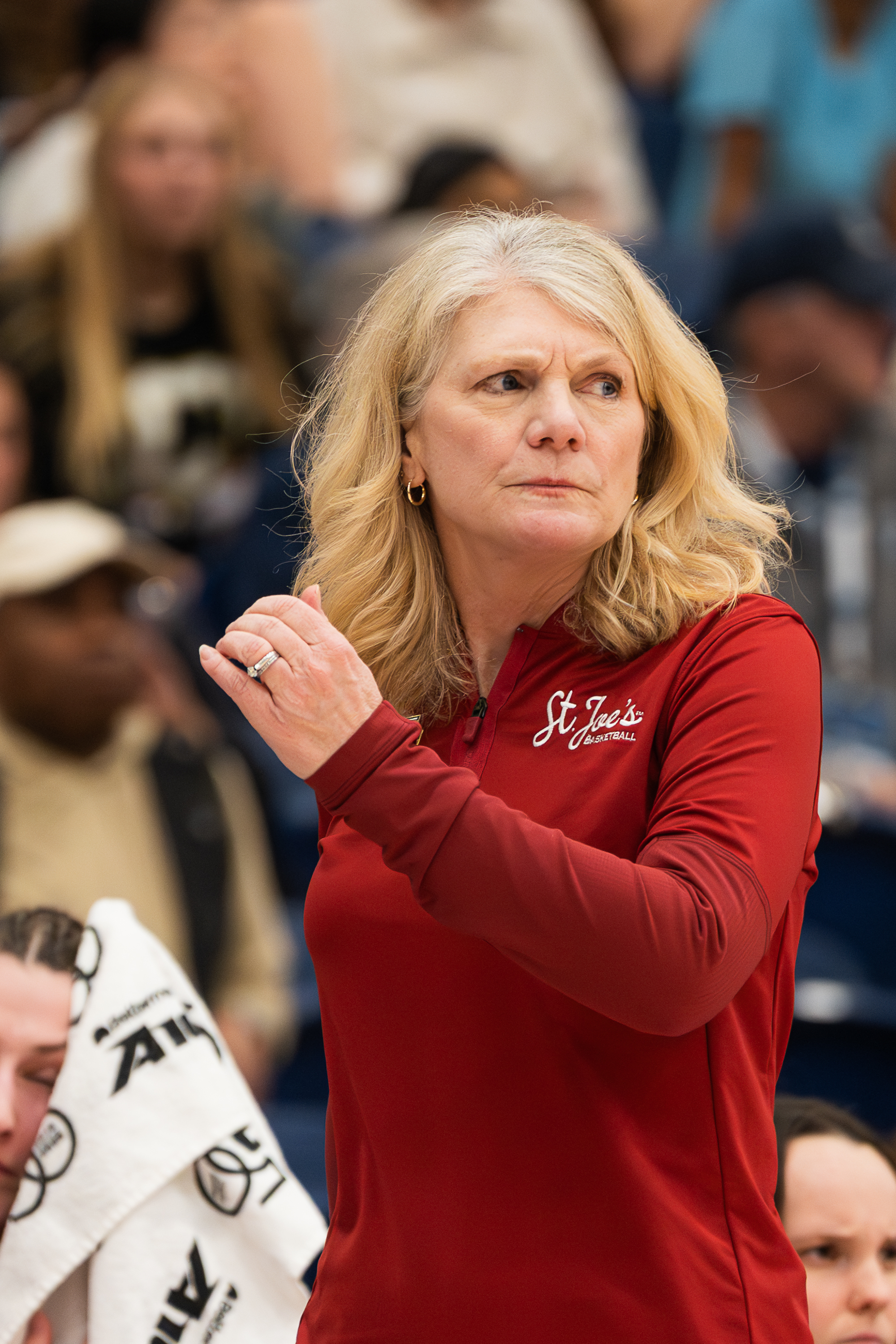
- Griffin with Saint Joseph's in March 2026 during the A10 Championship Tournament at Henrico Sports & Events Center

Current position
- Title: Head coach
- Team: Saint Joseph's
- Conference: Atlantic 10
- Record: 442–332 (.571)

Biographical details
- Born: July 11, 1969 (age 57)

Playing career
- 1987–1992: Saint Joseph's
- Position: Point guard

Coaching career (HC unless noted)
- 1992–1993: Saint Joseph's (grad. asst.)
- 1993–1995: Vanderbilt (asst.)
- 1995–1999: Loyola (MD) (asst.)
- 1999–2001: Loyola (MD)
- 2001–present: Saint Joseph's

Head coaching record
- Overall: 490–365 (.573)

Accomplishments and honors

Awards
- Atlantic 10 Coach of the Year (2003)

Cindy Griffin (née Anderson; July 11, 1969) is an American college basketball coach, currently women's head coach at Saint Joseph's University.

== Career ==
She was previously head coach at Loyola University in Maryland and an assistant at Vanderbilt.

== Head coaching record ==
Record table
Season	Team	Overall	Conference	Standing	Postseason
Loyola (MD) (Metro Atlantic Athletic Conference) (1998–2001)
1998–99	Loyola (MD)	17–6	13–5	3rd	
1999–2000	Loyola (MD)	12–17	8–10	T-5th	
2000–01	Loyola (MD)	19–10	12–6	3rd	
Loyola (MD):		48–33 (.593)	33–21 (.611)		
Saint Joseph's (Atlantic 10 Conference) (2002–present)
2001–02	Saint Joseph's	24–8	12–4	T-2nd	WNIT Second Round
2002–03	Saint Joseph's	19–11	13–3	2nd	WNIT Second Round
2003–04	Saint Joseph's	22–11	12–4	3rd	WNIT Third Round
2004–05	Saint Joseph's	7–23	4–12	T-11th	
2005–06	Saint Joseph's	20–11	11–6	T-4th	WNIT Second Round
2006–07	Saint Joseph's	19–14	8–6	5th	WNIT First Round
2007–08	Saint Joseph's	17–14	8–6	5th	
2008–09	Saint Joseph's	13–17	5–9	T-10th	
2009–10	Saint Joseph's	17–15	9–5	T-4th	WNIT First Round
2010–11	Saint Joseph's	20–12	8–6	8th	WNIT Second Round
2011–12	Saint Joseph's	22–11	9–5	T-4th	WNIT Second Round
2012–13	Saint Joseph's	23–9	11–3	T-4th	NCAA 1st Round
2013–14	Saint Joseph's	23–10	10–6	T-4th	NCAA 2nd Round
2014–15	Saint Joseph's	13–17	8–8	T-6th	
2015–16	Saint Joseph's	14–15	8–8	T-6th	
2016–17	Saint Joseph's	17–15	12–4	T-3rd	WNIT First Round
2017–18	Saint Joseph's	19–15	10–6	T-5th	WNIT Second Round
2018–19	Saint Joseph's	12–19	7–9	T–8th	
2019–20	Saint Joseph's	9–20	3–13	T–13th	
2020–21	Saint Joseph's	7–10	5–9	10th	
2021–22	Saint Joseph's	13–17	7–8	7th	
2022–23	Saint Joseph's	20–11	9–7	T–6th	WNIT First Round
2023–24	Saint Joseph's	28–6	15–3	T–2nd	WBIT Quarterfinals
2024–25	Saint Joseph's	24–10	12–6	4th	WBIT Second Round
2025–26	Saint Joseph's	20–11	10–8	T–5th	
2026–27	Saint Joseph's	0–0	0–0		
Saint Joseph's:		442–332 (.571)	226–166 (.577)		
Total:		490–365 (.573)			
National champion Postseason invitational champion Conference regular season champion Conference regular season and conference tournament champion Division regular season champion Division regular season and conference tournament champion Conference tournament champion
