= 2015–16 Bucknell Bison women's basketball team =

Intercollegiate basketball season

2015–16 Bucknell Bison women's basketball

Patriot League Regular Season Co-Champions

WNIT, Second Round
- Conference: Patriot League
- Record: 25–8 (17–1 Patriot)
- Head coach: Aaron Roussell (4th season)
- Assistant coaches: Mike Lane; Carissa Nord; Martina Wood
- Home arena: Sojka Pavilion

2015–16 Patriot League women's basketball standings
	Conf.				Overall
Team	W		L	PCT	W		L	PCT
Army †	17	–	1	.944	29	–	3	.906
Bucknell	17	–	1	.944	25	–	8	.758
Loyola (MD)	11	–	7	.611	16	–	16	.500
Lehigh	10	–	8	.556	18	–	13	.581
Holy Cross	10	–	8	.556	13	–	17	.433
Navy	9	–	9	.500	15	–	15	.500
American	5	–	13	.278	8	–	23	.258
Colgate	4	–	14	.222	7	–	23	.233
Lafayette	4	–	14	.222	6	–	23	.207
Boston University	3	–	15	.167	3	–	27	.100
† 2016 Patriot League tournament winner As of March 19, 2016; Rankings from AP poll

The 2015–16 Bucknell Bison women's basketball team represented Bucknell University during the 2015–16 NCAA Division I women's basketball season. The Bison, led by fifth-year head coach Aaron Roussell, played their home games at Sojka Pavilion and were members of the Patriot League. They finished the season 25–8, 17–1 in Patriot League play to share the Patriot League regular season title with Army. They advanced to the semifinals of the Patriot League women's tournament, where they lost to Loyola (MD). As champs of the Patriot League who failed to win their conference tournament, they received an automatic bid to the Women's National Invitation Tournament, where they defeated Akron in the first round before losing to Michigan in the second round.

== Roster ==
2015–16 Bucknell Bison women's basketball team
Players
Coaches

Pos.	#	Name	Height	Year	Previous school	Hometown
G	2	Kyi English	5 ft 5 in (1.65 m)	Fr	East Orange	East Orange, NJ
G	3	Tyler Craig	5 ft 8 in (1.73 m)	Sr	St. Francis DeSales	Columbus, OH
G	4	Claire Maree O'Bryan	5 ft 10 in (1.78 m)	Sr	The Hill School	Darwin, Australia
G	11	Megan McGurk	5 ft 7 in (1.7 m)	Jr	Academy of Notre Dame	West Chester, PA
F	12	Claire DeBoer	6 ft 1 in (1.85 m)	Jr	Grosse Point South	Grosse Pointe, MI
G	13	Rachael Dumiak	5 ft 11 in (1.8 m)	Fr	La Costa Canyon	Carlsbad, CA
G	20	Kate Walker	6 ft 0 in (1.83 m)	Fr	Red Oak Community	Red Oak, IA
G	21	Jacquie Klotz	6 ft 0 in (1.83 m)	So	The Lawrenceville School	West Windsor, NJ
F	22	Maegan Mikkelsen	6 ft 3 in (1.91 m)	Fr	Woodbridge	Woodbridge, VA
F	32	Catherine Romaine	6 ft 2 in (1.88 m)	So	Chapel Hill	Chapel Hill, NC
G	33	Carly Richardson	5 ft 11 in (1.8 m)	So	Palmyra	Palmyra, PA
G	34	Sheaira Jones	5 ft 9 in (1.75 m)	Sr	Colerain	Cincinnati, OH
F	41	Sune Swart	6 ft 3 in (1.91 m)	Jr	Cranberry	Cincinnati, OH
F	50	Kaitlyn Slagus	6 ft 2 in (1.88 m)	Fr	Belle Vernon	Belle Vernon, PA

Head coach

- Aaron Roussell (Iowa)

Assistant coach(es)

- Mike Lane (Notre Dame)
- Carissa Nord (South Dakota State)
- Martina Wood (North Carolina)

Legend

- (C) Team captain
- (S) Suspended
- (I) Ineligible
- (W) Walk-on
- Injured
- Current redshirt

Roster

== Schedule ==
Date time, TV	Rank^{#}	Opponent^{#}	Result	Record	Site (attendance) city, state
Non-conference regular season
11/13/2015*; 7:00 pm, ESPN3		at Cleveland State	W 59–57	1–0	Wolstein Center (297); Cleveland, OH
11/15/2015*; 1:00 pm		at No. 3 Notre Dame	L 54–85	1–1	Edmund P. Joyce Center (8,948); South Bend, IN
11/18/2015*; 7:00 pm		Binghamton	W 76–46	2–1	Sojka Pavilion (347); Lewisburg, PA
11/18/2015*; 7:00 pm		at Manhattan	W 61–56	3–1	Draddy Gymnasium (688); Riverdale, NY
11/24/2015*; 4:30 pm		Mount St. Mary's	W 71–45	4–1	Sojka Pavilion (389); Lewisburg, PA
11/29/2015*; 2:00 pm, ESPN3		at Canisius	L 56–61	4–2	Koessler Athletic Center (606); Buffalo, NY
12/02/2015*; 4:30 pm		Youngstown State	L 47–55	4–3	Sojka Pavilion (421); Lewisburg, PA
12/04/2015*; 7:00 pm		Fairleigh Dickinson	W 72–62	5–3	Sojka Pavilion (401); Lewisburg, PA
12/08/2015*; 7:00 pm		at UMBC	L 52–65	5–4	Retriever Activities Center (612); Catonsville, MD
12/20/2015*; 2:00 pm		Delaware	W 80–51	6–4	Sojka Pavilion (496); Lewisburg, PA
12/22/2015*; 12:00 pm		at Morgan State	L 50–64	6–5	Talmadge L. Hill Field House (105); Baltimore, MD
Patriot League regular season
12/30/2015; 7:00 pm		at Navy	W 51–41	7–5 (1–0)	Alumni Hall (578); Annapolis, MD
01/02/2016; 2:00 pm		Army	W 79–69	8–5 (2–0)	Sojka Pavilion (507); Lewisburg, PA
01/06/2016; 7:00 pm		at American	W 66–60	9–5 (3–0)	Bender Arena (165); Washington, D.C.
01/09/2016; 1:00 pm		at Holy Cross	W 58–51	10–5 (4–0)	Hart Center (1,063); Worcester, MA
01/13/2016; 7:00 pm		Lehigh	W 80–77 ^{OT}	11–5 (5–0)	Sojka Pavilion (527); Lewisburg, PA
01/16/2016; 4:00 pm		at Colgate	W 71–51	12–5 (6–0)	Cotterell Court (494); Hamilton, NY
01/20/2016; 7:00 pm		Loyola (MD)	W 71–64	13–5 (7–0)	Sojka Pavilion (454); Lewisburg, PA
01/23/2016; 4:00 pm		Boston University	W 74–56	14–5 (8–0)	Sojka Pavilion (415); Lewisburg, PA
01/30/2016; 1:00 pm		at Army	L 63–68	14–6 (8–1)	Christl Arena (1,185); West Point, NY
02/03/2016; 7:00 pm		American	W 60–54 ^{OT}	15–6 (9–1)	Sojka Pavilion (523); Lewisburg, PA
02/06/2016; 12:00 pm		Holy Cross	W 74–64	16–6 (10–1)	Sojka Pavilion (677); Lewisburg, PA
02/10/2016; 7:00 pm		at Lehigh	W 67–54	17–6 (11–1)	Stabler Arena (626); Bethlehem, PA
02/13/2016; 2:00 pm		Colgate	W 79–60	18–6 (12–1)	Sojka Pavilion (596); Lewisburg, PA
02/17/2016; 7:00 pm		at Loyola (MD)	W 64–42	19–6 (13–1)	Reitz Arena (514); Baltimore, MD
02/20/2016; 2:00 pm		at Boston University	W 72–59	20–6 (14–1)	Case Gym (256); Boston, MA
02/24/2016; 7:00 pm		Lafayette	W 69–55	21–6 (15–1)	Sojka Pavilion (314); Lewisburg, PA
02/27/2016; 7:00 pm		Navy	W 64–52	22–6 (16–1)	Sojka Pavilion (716); Lewisburg, PA
03/02/2016; 6:00 pm, ASN		at Lafayette	W 68–59	23–6 (17–1)	Kirby Sports Center (476); Easton, PA
Patriot League Women's Tournament
03/07/2016; 7:00 pm		American; Quarterfinals	W 73–65	24–6	Sojka Pavilion (661); Lewisburg, PA
03/11/2016; 7:30 pm		Loyola (MD); Semifinals	L 53–65	24–7	Sojka Pavilion (768); Lewisburg, PA
WNIT
03/17/2016*; 7:00 pm		at Akron; First Round	W 74–70	25–7	James A. Rhodes Arena (343); Akron, OH
03/19/2016*; 2:00 pm		at Michigan; Second Round	L 72–95	25–8	Crisler Center (938); Ann Arbor, MI
*Non-conference game. ^{#}Rankings from AP Poll. (#) Tournament seedings in parentheses. All times are in Eastern Time.

== See also ==
- 2015–16 Bucknell Bison men's basketball team
