= 2015–16 Lafayette Leopards women's basketball team =

Intercollegiate basketball season

2015–16 Lafayette Leopards women's basketball
- Conference: Patriot League
- Record: 6–23 (4–14 Patriot)
- Head coach: Theresa Grentz (1st season)
- Assistant coaches: C.K. Calhoun; Ross James; Kristen Foley
- Home arena: Kirby Sports Center

2015–16 Patriot League women's basketball standings
	Conf.				Overall
Team	W		L	PCT	W		L	PCT
Army †	17	–	1	.944	29	–	3	.906
Bucknell	17	–	1	.944	25	–	8	.758
Loyola (MD)	11	–	7	.611	16	–	16	.500
Lehigh	10	–	8	.556	18	–	13	.581
Holy Cross	10	–	8	.556	13	–	17	.433
Navy	9	–	9	.500	15	–	15	.500
American	5	–	13	.278	8	–	23	.258
Colgate	4	–	14	.222	7	–	23	.233
Lafayette	4	–	14	.222	6	–	23	.207
Boston University	3	–	15	.167	3	–	27	.100
† 2016 Patriot League tournament winner As of March 19, 2016; Rankings from AP poll

The 2015–16 Lafayette Leopards women's basketball team represented Lafayette College during the 2015–16 NCAA Division I women's basketball season. The Leopards, led by first year head coach Theresa Grentz, played their home games at Kirby Sports Center and were members of the Patriot League. They finished the season 6–23, 4–14 in Patriot League play to finish in a tie for eighth place. They lost in the first round of the Patriot League women's tournament to Colgate.

== Roster ==
2015–16 Lafayette Leopards women's basketball team
Players
Coaches

Pos.	#	Name	Height	Year	Previous school	Hometown
G	2	Nia Holland	5 ft 6 in (1.68 m)	Fr	Shipley School	Landsdowne, PA
G	5	Anna Ptasinski	5 ft 10 in (1.78 m)	So	Regis Jesuit	Highlands Ranch, CO
G	11	Alex Cantwell	5 ft 10 in (1.78 m)	Fr	North Shore	Glen Head, NY
G	13	Jamie O'Hare	5 ft 6 in (1.68 m)	Sr	St. Peter's	Staten Island, NY
F	14	Harriet Ottewill-Soulsby	6 ft 3 in (1.91 m)	Jr	Charnwood College	Loughborough, England
C	15	Angela Ribarich	6 ft 5 in (1.96 m)	Fr	St. Joseph's College	Toronto, ON
G	22	Sammy Stipa	5 ft 5 in (1.65 m)	So	Spring-Ford	Royersford, PA
G	23	Maia Hood	5 ft 9 in (1.75 m)	Jr	Alexander Hamilton	Elmsford, NY
F	33	Annette Snow	5 ft 11 in (1.8 m)	Sr	Blair Academy	Manalapan, NJ
C	42	Ellen Graham	6 ft 2 in (1.88 m)	So	Lincoln-Way North	Frankford, IL
F	43	Ashley Lutz	6 ft 1 in (1.85 m)	So	Lincoln Sudbury	Sudbury, MA

Head coach

- Theresa Grentz (Immaculata)

Assistant coach(es)

- C.K. Calhoun (Marymount)
- Ross James (Millsaps)
- Kristen Foley (Rutgers)

Legend

- (C) Team captain
- (S) Suspended
- (I) Ineligible
- (W) Walk-on
- Injured
- Current redshirt

Roster

== Schedule ==
Date time, TV	Rank^{#}	Opponent^{#}	Result	Record	Site (attendance) city, state
Non-conference regular season
11/13/2015*; 7:00 pm		at Delaware	L 47–67	0–1	Bob Carpenter Center (1,382); Newark, DE
11/17/2015*; 7:00 pm		at Penn	L 37–54	0–2	The Palestra (413); Philadelphia, PA
11/20/2015*; 7:00 pm		Duquesne	L 65–73	0–3	Kirby Sports Center (377); Easton, PA
11/22/2015*; 2:00 pm		at Hartford	L 50–55	0–4	Chase Arena at Reich Family Pavilion (802); Hartford, CT
11/24/2015*; 6:00 pm		at Fordham	L 49–61	0–5	Rose Hill Gymnasium; Bronx, NY
11/29/2015*; 4:30 pm, WBPH		Saint Peter's	W 72–69	1–5	Kirby Sports Center (437); Easton, PA
12/04/2015*; 7:00 pm		St. Francis Brooklyn	W 77–59	2–5	Kirby Sports Center (428); Easton, PA
12/09/2015*; 5:00 pm		at Wagner	L 48–69	2–6	Spiro Sports Center (235); Staten Island, NY
12/22/2015; 5:00 pm, WBPH		Colgate	L 59–72	2–7 (0–1)	Kirby Sports Center (377); Easton, PA
12/28/2015*; 4:30 pm		vs. Richmond; Cavalier Classic Tournament	L 46–54	2–8	John Paul Jones Arena (473); Charlottesville, VA
12/29/2015*; 4:30 pm		vs. Coppin State; Cavalier Classic Tournament	L 57–64	2–9	John Paul Jones Arena (308); Charlottesville, VA
Patriot League regular season
01/02/2016; 2:00 pm		at Loyola (MD)	L 65–66	2–10 (0–2)	Reitz Arena (226); Baltimore, MD
01/06/2016; 7:00 pm, WBPH		Army	L 45–78	2–11 (0–3)	Kirby Sports Center (377); Easton, PA
01/09/2016; 2:00 pm, WBPH		Boston University	W 71–56	3–11 (1–3)	Kirby Sports Center (297); Easton, PA
01/13/2016; 1:00 pm		at Holy Cross	L 49–66	3–12 (1–4)	Hart Center (906); Worcester, MA
01/16/2016; 2:00 pm, WBPH		Navy	L 58–65 ^{OT}	3–13 (1–5)	Kirby Sports Center (449); Easton, PA
01/20/2016; 7:00 pm		at American	W 60–51	4–13 (2–5)	Bender Arena (160); Washington, D.C.
01/27/2016; 7:00 pm, SE2		at Lehigh	L 74–82	4–14 (2–6)	Stabler Arena (870); Bethlehem, PA
01/30/2016; 2:00 pm, WBPH		Loyola (MD)	L 51–55	4–15 (2–7)	Kirby Sports Center (871); Easton, PA
02/03/2016; 7:00 pm		at Army	L 57–84	4–16 (2–8)	Christl Arena (648); West Point, NY
02/06/2016; 2:00 pm		at Boston University	W 71–64	5–16 (3–8)	Case Gym (253); Boston, MA
02/10/2016; 7:00 pm, WBPH		Holy Cross	L 54–57	5–17 (3–9)	Kirby Sports Center (344); Easton, PA
02/13/2016; 7:00 pm		at Navy	L 49–64	5–18 (3–10)	Alumni Hall (867); Annapolis, MD
02/17/2016; 7:00 pm, WBPH		American	W 63–49	6–18 (4–10)	Kirby Sports Center (344); Easton, PA
02/20/2016; 2:00 pm, WBPH		Lehigh	L 65–80	6–19 (4–11)	Kirby Sports Center (1,224); Easton, PA
02/24/2016; 7:00 pm		at Bucknell	L 55–69	6–20 (4–12)	Sojka Pavilion (314); Lewisburg, PA
02/27/2016; 4:00 pm		at Colgate	L 55–70	6–21 (4–13)	Cotterell Court; Hamilton, NY
03/02/2016; 6:00 pm, ASN		Bucknell	L 59–68	6–22 (4–14)	Kirby Sports Center (476); Easton, PA
Patriot League Women's Tournament
03/05/2016; 4:00 pm		at Colgate; First Round	L 68–80	6–23	Cotterell Court (717); Hamilton, NY
*Non-conference game. ^{#}Rankings from AP poll. (#) Tournament seedings in parentheses. All times are in Eastern Time.

== See also ==
- 2015–16 Lafayette Leopards men's basketball team
