= 2015–16 Lehigh Mountain Hawks women's basketball team =

Intercollegiate basketball season

2015–16 Lehigh Mountain Hawks women's basketball
- Conference: Patriot League
- Record: 18–13 (10–8 Patriot)
- Head coach: Sue Troyan (21st season)
- Assistant coaches: Glenn Rigney; Caitlin Gillard; Maggie Serratelli
- Home arena: Stabler Arena

2015–16 Patriot League women's basketball standings
	Conf.				Overall
Team	W		L	PCT	W		L	PCT
Army †	17	–	1	.944	29	–	3	.906
Bucknell	17	–	1	.944	25	–	8	.758
Loyola (MD)	11	–	7	.611	16	–	16	.500
Lehigh	10	–	8	.556	18	–	13	.581
Holy Cross	10	–	8	.556	13	–	17	.433
Navy	9	–	9	.500	15	–	15	.500
American	5	–	13	.278	8	–	23	.258
Colgate	4	–	14	.222	7	–	23	.233
Lafayette	4	–	14	.222	6	–	23	.207
Boston University	3	–	15	.167	3	–	27	.100
† 2016 Patriot League tournament winner As of March 19, 2016; Rankings from AP poll

The 2015–16 Lehigh Mountain Hawks women's basketball team represented Lehigh University during the 2015–16 NCAA Division I women's basketball season. The Mountain Hawks, led by twenty-first year head coach Sue Troyan, played their home games at Stabler Arena and are members of the Patriot League. They finished the season 18–13, 10–8 in Patriot League play to finish in a tie for fourth place. They advanced to the semifinals of the Patriot League women's tournament where they lost to Army.

== Roster ==
2015–16 Lehigh Mountain Hawks women's basketball team
Players
Coaches

Pos.	#	Name	Height	Year	Previous school	Hometown
G	5	Elizabeth Jordan	5 ft 10 in (1.78 m)	Sr	Hononegah Community HS	Roscoe, IL
G/F	10	Kiernan McCloskey	6 ft 1 in (1.85 m)	Jr	Germantown Academy	Lower Gwynedd, PA
G	11	Taylor Campbell	5 ft 9 in (1.75 m)	So	Marquette HS	Chesterfield, MO
G	12	Lexi Martins	6 ft 0 in (1.83 m)	Jr	Irvington HS	Irvington, NY
C	13	Megan Eripret	6 ft 3 in (1.91 m)	Fr	Salisbury HS	Allentown, PA
G	15	Bernadette Devaney	5 ft 8 in (1.73 m)	So	Nova HS	Cooper City, FL
G	20	Quinci Mann	5 ft 10 in (1.78 m)	So	St. Ignatius Prep	Oakland, CA
F	22	Elizabeth Sharlow	6 ft 2 in (1.88 m)	Sr	Bishop George Ahr HS	Edison, NJ
G	23	Kari Moffat	5 ft 6 in (1.68 m)	Jr	Adlai E. Stevenson HS	Lincolnshire, IL
F	24	Bryce Menendez	6 ft 2 in (1.88 m)	Fr	Neuqua Valley HS	Naperville, IL
G	25	Kayla Burton	5 ft 8 in (1.73 m)	Jr	Newton South HS	Newton, MA
G	33	Hailey Pascoe	5 ft 9 in (1.75 m)	Fr	Clayton Valley HS	Concord, CA
F	34	Kerry Kinek	6 ft 3 in (1.91 m)	Sr	Allentown Central Catholic HS	Whitehall, PA
G	35	Amina Affini	6 ft 0 in (1.83 m)	Sr	Wilmington HS	Wilmington, OH
F	44	Mae Williams	6 ft 0 in (1.83 m)	So	Monarch HS	Lafayette, OH

Head coach

- Sue Troyan (Dickinson)

Assistant coach(es)

- Glenn Rigney (Miami (FL))
- Caitlin Gillard (Colgate)
- Maggie Serratelli (Holy Family)

Legend

- (C) Team captain
- (S) Suspended
- (I) Ineligible
- (W) Walk-on
- Injured
- Current redshirt

Roster

== Schedule ==
Date time, TV	Rank^{#}	Opponent^{#}	Result	Record	Site (attendance) city, state
Non-conference regular season
11/13/2015*; 7:00 pm		Monmouth	W 95–88 ^{OT}	1–0	Stabler Arena (610); Bethlehem, PA
11/15/2015*; 2:00 pm		Kutztown	W 81–51	2–0	Stabler Arena (313); Bethlehem, PA
11/19/2015*; 5:00 pm		at NJIT	W 75–47	3–0	Fleisher Center (606); Newark, NJ
11/23/2015*; 7:00 pm		at Delaware State	W 83–49	4–0	Memorial Hall (357); Dover, DE
11/25/2015*; 5:00 pm		Saint Peter's	W 74–42	5–0	Stabler Arena (529); Bethlehem, PA
11/28/2015*; 4:00 pm		Montana; Lehigh Christmas City Classic semifinals	W 80–53	6–0	Stabler Arena (667); Bethlehem, PA
11/29/2015*; 2:30 pm		Villanova; Lehigh Christmas City Classic championship	L 44–65	6–1	Stabler Arena (652); Bethlehem, PA
12/02/2015*; 11:00 am		Saint Joseph's	L 62–63	6–2	Stabler Arena (3,659); Bethlehem, PA
12/06/2015*; 3:00 pm		at Illinois	L 67–76	6–3	State Farm Center (1,800); Champaign, IL
12/17/2015*; 7:00 pm		at Rider	L 60–61 ^{OT}	6–4	Alumni Gymnasium (384); Lawrenceville, NJ
12/20/2015*; 3:00 pm		at Hampton	W 63–56	7–4	Hampton Convocation Center (1,011); Hampton, VA
Patriot League regular season
12/30/2015; 7:00 pm		at Army	L 39–63	7–5 (0–1)	Christl Arena (906); West Point, NY
01/02/2016; 2:00 pm		at Boston University	W 73–66	8–5 (1–1)	Case Gym (201); Boston, MA
01/06/2016; 7:00 pm, SE2		Loyola (MD)	W 66–48	9–5 (2–1)	Stabler Arena (639); Bethlehem, PA
01/09/2016; 2:00 pm, SE2		American	L 55–59	9–6 (2–2)	Stabler Arena (694); Bethlehem, PA
01/13/2016; 7:00 pm		at Bucknell	L 77–80 ^{OT}	9–7 (2–3)	Sojka Pavilion (527); Lewisburg, PA
01/17/2016; 3:00 pm, ASN		Holy Cross	W 61–58	10–7 (3–3)	Stabler Arena (770); Bethlehem, PA
01/20/2016; 7:00 pm		at Navy	W 51–48	11–7 (4–3)	Alumni Hall (1,271); Annapolis, MD
01/27/2016; 5:00 pm, SE2		Lafayette	W 82–74	12–7 (5–3)	Stabler Arena (870); Bethlehem, PA
01/30/2016; 2:00 pm, SE2		Boston University	W 72–48	13–7 (6–3)	Stabler Arena (920); Bethlehem, PA
02/03/2016; 7:00 pm		at Loyola (MD)	W 76–68	14–7 (7–3)	Reitz Arena (293); Baltimore, MD
02/06/2016; 2:00 pm		at American	W 61–52	15–7 (8–3)	Bender Arena (353); Washington, D.C.
02/10/2016; 7:00 pm, SE2		Bucknell	L 54–67	15–8 (8–4)	Stabler Arena (626); Bethlehem, PA
02/13/2016; 1:00 pm		at Holy Cross	L 71–77 ^{OT}	15–9 (8–5)	Hart Center (1,542); Worcester, MA
02/17/2016; 7:00 pm, SE2		Navy	L 54–62	15–10 (8–6)	Stabler Arena (761); Bethlehem, PA
02/20/2016; 2:00 pm		at Lafayette	W 80–65	16–10 (9–6)	Kirby Sports Center (1,224); Easton, PA
02/24/2016; 7:00 pm, SE2		Colgate	W 83–74	17–10 (10–6)	Stabler Arena (547); Bethlehem, PA
02/27/2016; 7:30 pm, SE2		Army	L 49–69	17–11 (10–7)	Stabler Arena (1,198); Bethlehem, PA
03/02/2016; 7:00 pm		at Colgate	L 72–82	17–12 (10–8)	Cotterell Court (717); Hamilton, NY
Patriot League Women's Tournament
03/07/2016; 7:00 pm		Holy Cross; Quarterfinals	W 64–48	18–12	Stabler Arena (470); Bethlehem, PA
03/11/2016; 5:00 pm		at Army; Semifinals	L 46–76	18–13	Christl Arena; West Point, NY
*Non-conference game. ^{#}Rankings from AP Poll. (#) Tournament seedings in parentheses. All times are in Eastern Time.

== See also ==
- 2015–16 Lehigh Mountain Hawks men's basketball team
