= 2015–16 Holy Cross Crusaders women's basketball team =

Intercollegiate basketball season

2015–16 Holy Cross Crusaders women's basketball
- Conference: Patriot League
- Record: 13–17 (10–8 Patriot)
- Head coach: Bill Gibbons (31st season)
- Assistant coaches: Ann McInerney; Matt Raquet; Kara Powell
- Home arena: Hart Center

2015–16 Patriot League women's basketball standings
| | Conf. | | | | Overall |
| Team | W | | L | PCT | W | | L | PCT |
|---|---|---|---|---|---|---|---|---|
| Army † | 17 | – | 1 | .944 | 29 | – | 3 | .906 |
| Bucknell | 17 | – | 1 | .944 | 25 | – | 8 | .758 |
| Loyola (MD) | 11 | – | 7 | .611 | 16 | – | 16 | .500 |
| Lehigh | 10 | – | 8 | .556 | 18 | – | 13 | .581 |
| Holy Cross | 10 | – | 8 | .556 | 13 | – | 17 | .433 |
| Navy | 9 | – | 9 | .500 | 15 | – | 15 | .500 |
| American | 5 | – | 13 | .278 | 8 | – | 23 | .258 |
| Colgate | 4 | – | 14 | .222 | 7 | – | 23 | .233 |
| Lafayette | 4 | – | 14 | .222 | 6 | – | 23 | .207 |
| Boston University | 3 | – | 15 | .167 | 3 | – | 27 | .100 |
† 2016 Patriot League tournament winner As of March 19, 2016; Rankings from AP poll

The 2015–16 Holy Cross Crusaders women's basketball team represented the College of the Holy Cross during the 2015–16 NCAA Division I women's basketball season. The Crusaders, led by thirty-first year head coach Bill Gibbons, played their home games at the Hart Center and were members of the Patriot League. They finished the season 13–17, 10–8 in Patriot League play to finish in a tie for fourth place. They lost in the quarterfinals of the Patriot League women's tournament to Lehigh.

== Roster ==
2015–16 Holy Cross Crusaders women's basketball team
Players
Coaches

| Pos. | # | Name | Height | Year | Previous school | Hometown |
|---|---|---|---|---|---|---|
| G | 3 | Infiniti Thomas-Waheed | 5 ft 10 in (1.78 m) | So | Newton North | Newton, MA |
| G | 4 | Tricia Byrne | 5 ft 7 in (1.7 m) | So | Scranton Prep | Dunmore, PA |
| G | 5 | Katie Doherty | 5 ft 10 in (1.78 m) | So | Sachem East | Holbrook, NY |
| G | 11 | Shannon Druck | 5 ft 8 in (1.73 m) | So | Susquehannock | New Freedom, PA |
| G | 12 | Lisa Mifsud | 5 ft 7 in (1.7 m) | Sr | Villa Maria Academy | Erie, PA |
| G/F | 15 | Madelyn Ganser | 5 ft 11 in (1.8 m) | Jr | Needham | Needham, MA |
| F | 23 | Maggie Locke | 6 ft 1 in (1.85 m) | Fr | Spring-Ford | Collegeville, PA |
| G | 24 | Kate Gillespie | 5 ft 8 in (1.73 m) | Sr | Georgetown Visitation | Washington, D.C. |
| F | 31 | Raquel Scott | 6 ft 0 in (1.83 m) | Sr | Immaculate Heart Academy | Ridgewood, NJ |
| C | 40 | Molly Hourigan | 6 ft 4 in (1.93 m) | Sr | Jordan-Elbridge | Memphis, NY |
| F | 41 | Amy Hasenauer | 6 ft 2 in (1.88 m) | So | Hilton | Greece, NY |
| C | 55 | Miranda Nixon | 6 ft 3 in (1.91 m) | Fr | Trinity | Harrisburg, PA |

Head coach

- Bill Gibbons (Clark)

Assistant coach(es)

- Ann McInerney (Assumption (MA))
- Matt Raquet (Pittsburgh)
- Kara Powell (Richmond)

Legend

- (C) Team captain
- (S) Suspended
- (I) Ineligible
- (W) Walk-on
- Injured
- Current redshirt

Roster

== Schedule ==
| Date time, TV | Rank^{#} | Opponent^{#} | Result | Record | Site (attendance) city, state |
Non-conference regular season
| 11/13/2015*; 6:00 pm | | at Penn State | L 82–86 ^{OT} | 0–1 | Bryce Jordan Center (2,941); University Park, PA |
| 11/15/2015*; 2:05 pm | | Massachusetts | L 60–74 | 0–2 | Hart Center (767); Worcester, MA |
| 11/18/2015*; 7:00 pm | | at Boston College | L 51–60 | 0–3 | Conte Forum (413); Chestnut Hill, MA |
| 11/21/2015*; 2:00 pm | | at Quinnipiac | L 61–74 | 0–4 | TD Bank Sports Center (421); Hamden, CT |
| 11/25/2015*; 2:00 pm | | at Yale | L 59–69 | 0–5 | John J. Lee Amphitheater (162); New Haven, CT |
| 11/29/2015*; 3:05 pm | | Bryant | W 65–64 | 1–5 | Hart Center (768); Worcester, MA |
| 12/02/2015*; 7:05 pm | | Vermont | W 77–63 | 2–5 | Hart Center (652); Worcester, MA |
| 12/06/2015*; 3:00 pm | | at Pittsburgh | L 50–56 | 2–6 | Peterson Events Center (848); Pittsburgh, PA |
| 12/09/2015*; 7:00 pm | | at UMass Lowell | L 67–75 | 2–7 | Costello Athletic Center (226); Lowell, MA |
| 12/12/2015*; 1:05 pm | | Manhattan | W 58–44 | 3–7 | Hart Center (748); Worcester, MA |
| 12/21/2015*; 11:15 am | | Dartmouth | L 54–60 | 3–8 | Hart Center (3,225); Worcester, MA |
Patriot League regular season
| 12/30/2015; 2:00 pm | | at Boston University | W 60–41 | 4–8 (1–0) | Case Gym (172); Boston, MA |
| 01/02/2016; 1:05 pm | | Navy | W 57–49 | 5–8 (2–0) | Hart Center (987); Worcester, MA |
| 01/06/2016; 12:00 pm | | at Colgate | W 80–71 | 6–8 (3–0) | Cotterell Court (1,185); Hamilton, NY |
| 01/09/2016; 1:05 pm | | Bucknell | L 51–58 | 6–9 (3–1) | Hart Center (1,063); Worcester, MA |
| 01/13/2016; 7:05 pm | | Lafayette | W 66–49 | 7–9 (4–1) | Hart Center (906); Worcester, MA |
| 01/17/2016; 3:00 pm, ASN | | at Lehigh | L 58–61 | 7–10 (4–2) | Stabler Arena (770); Bethlehem, PA |
| 01/20/2016; 7:00 pm | | at Army | L 58–77 | 7–11 (4–3) | Christl Arena (811); West Point, NY |
| 01/26/2016; 7:05 pm | | American | W 59–54 | 8–11 (5–3) | Hart Center (889); Worcester, MA |
| 01/30/2016; 4:00 pm | | at Navy | L 49–50 | 8–12 (5–4) | Alumni Hall (1,017); Annapolis, MD |
| 02/03/2016; 7:05 pm | | Colgate | W 70–61 | 9–12 (6–4) | Hart Center (876); Worcester, MA |
| 02/06/2016; 2:00 pm | | at Bucknell | L 64–74 | 9–13 (6–5) | Sojka Pavilion (677); Lewisburg, PA |
| 02/10/2016; 7:00 pm | | at Lafayette | W 57–54 | 10–13 (7–5) | Kirby Sports Center (344); Easton, PA |
| 02/13/2016; 1:05 pm | | Lehigh | W 77–71 ^{OT} | 11–13 (8–5) | Hart Center (1,542); Worcester, MA |
| 02/17/2016; 7:05 pm | | Army | L 49–80 | 11–14 (8–6) | Hart Center (1,456); Worcester, MA |
| 02/20/2016; 2:00 pm | | at American | W 59–50 | 12–14 (9–6) | Bender Arena (298); Washington, D.C. |
| 02/24/2016; 7:05 pm | | Loyola (MD) | L 49–59 | 12–15 (9–7) | Hart Center (1,011); Worcester, MA |
| 02/27/2016; 1:05 pm | | Boston University | W 74–50 | 13–15 (10–7) | Hart Center (1,385); Worcester, MA |
| 03/02/2016; 7:00 pm | | at Loyola (MD) | L 45–58 | 13–16 (10–8) | Reitz Arena (317); Baltimore, MD |
Patriot League Women's Tournament
| 03/07/2016; 7:00 pm | | at Lehigh; Quarterfinals | L 48–64 | 13–17 | Stabler Arena (470); Bethlehem, PA |
*Non-conference game. ^{#}Rankings from AP Poll. (#) Tournament seedings in parentheses. All times are in Eastern Time.

== See also ==
2015–16 Holy Cross Crusaders men's basketball team
