= 2015–16 American Eagles women's basketball team =

Intercollegiate basketball season

2015–16 American Eagles women's basketball
- Conference: Patriot League
- Record: 8–23 (5–13 Patriot)
- Head coach: Megan Gebbia (3rd season)
- Assistant coaches: Tiffany Coll; Nikki Flores; Emily Stallings
- Home arena: Bender Arena

2015–16 Patriot League women's basketball standings
	Conf.				Overall
Team	W		L	PCT	W		L	PCT
Army †	17	–	1	.944	29	–	3	.906
Bucknell	17	–	1	.944	25	–	8	.758
Loyola (MD)	11	–	7	.611	16	–	16	.500
Lehigh	10	–	8	.556	18	–	13	.581
Holy Cross	10	–	8	.556	13	–	17	.433
Navy	9	–	9	.500	15	–	15	.500
American	5	–	13	.278	8	–	23	.258
Colgate	4	–	14	.222	7	–	23	.233
Lafayette	4	–	14	.222	6	–	23	.207
Boston University	3	–	15	.167	3	–	27	.100
† 2016 Patriot League tournament winner As of March 19, 2016; Rankings from AP poll

The 2015–16 American Eagles women's basketball team represented American University during the 2015–16 NCAA Division I women's basketball season. The Eagles, led by third year head coach Megan Gebbia, played their home games at Bender Arena and were members of the Patriot League. They finished the season 8–23, 5–13 in Patriot League play to finish in seventh place. They advanced to the quarterfinals of the Patriot League women's tournament where they lost to Bucknell.

== Roster ==
2015–16 American Eagles women's basketball team
Players
Coaches

Pos.	#	Name	Height	Year	Previous school	Hometown
G	1	Asha Henley (W)	5 ft 5 in (1.65 m)	So	Blake	Silver Spring, Maryland
G	2	Brianna DuBose (I) (redshirt)	5 ft 11 in (1.8 m)	Jr	Bishop McNamara; VCU	Bowie, Maryland
G	3	Kaitlyn Lewis	5 ft 7 in (1.7 m)	Fr	North Pocono	Scranton, Pennsylvania
G	4	Emily Kinneston	5 ft 8 in (1.73 m)	So	Champlain Valley Union	Shelburne, Vermont
F	10	Lauren Crisler	6 ft 2 in (1.88 m)	Jr	North Penn	North Wales, Pennsylvania
F	12	Michelle Holmes	6 ft 1 in (1.85 m)	Sr	Notre Dame Academy	Toledo, Ohio
F	13	Michaela Nieuwenhuizen	6 ft 3 in (1.91 m)	Fr	The Peddie School	Strathroy, ON
F	14	Maria Liddane	5 ft 8 in (1.73 m)	So	Grosse Point North	Grosse Pointe Woods, Michigan
G/F	20	Jordan Light	6 ft 0 in (1.83 m)	Jr	Good Counsel	Vienna, Virginia
G	21	Kate Bond	5 ft 9 in (1.75 m)	So	Mount St. Mary	Norman, Oklahoma
G	23	Elina Koskimies	6 ft 0 in (1.83 m)	Fr	Makelanrinne Sports High	Helsinki, Finland
F	25	Io Chaney (I) (redshirt)	5 ft 11 in (1.8 m)	So	St. Vincent Pallotti; Norfolk State	Bowie, Maryland
G	32	Ari Booth	5 ft 7 in (1.7 m)	Sr	Pflugerville	Pflugerville, Texas
F	33	Michael Harris	6 ft 1 in (1.85 m)	So	Abington	Abington, Pennsylvania
F	44	Cecily Carl	6 ft 3 in (1.91 m)	Fr	Mechanicsburg	Mechanicsburg, Pennsylvania

Head coach

- Megan Gebbia (Towson)

Assistant coach(es)

- Tiffany Coll (UMBC)
- Nikki Flores (Marist)
- Emily Stallings (Marist)

Legend

- (C) Team captain
- (S) Suspended
- (I) Ineligible
- (W) Walk-on
- Injured
- Current redshirt

Roster

== Schedule ==
Date time, TV	Rank^{#}	Opponent^{#}	Result	Record	Site (attendance) city, state
Non-conference regular season
11/13/2015*; 7:00 pm		at Princeton	L 34–72	0–1	Jadwin Gymnasium (864); Princeton, New Jersey
11/17/2015*; 7:00 pm		at No. 22 George Washington	L 48–78	0–2	Charles E. Smith Center (785); Washington, D.C.
11/19/2015*; 7:00 pm		Hofstra	L 51–60	0–3	Bender Arena (307); Washington, D.C.
11/22/2015*; 7:00 pm		Elon	L 54–62	0–4	Bender Arena (240); Washington, D.C.
11/25/2015*; 5:00 pm		at William & Mary	L 51–62	0–5	Kaplan Arena; Williamsburg, Virginia
11/29/2015*; 2:00 pm		Wake Forest	L 70–71	0–6	Bender Arena (268); Washington, D.C.
12/02/2015*; 7:00 pm		at UMBC	L 46–47	0–7	Retriever Activities Center (467); Catonsville, Maryland
12/05/2015*; 7:00 pm		at James Madison	L 45–74	0–8	JMU Convocation Center (2,718); Harrisonburg, Virginia
12/17/2015*; 7:00 pm		at Dartmouth	W 45–41	1–8	Leede Arena (428); Hanover, New Hampshire
12/20/2015*; 5:30 pm		Manhattan	W 52–48	2–8	Bender Arena (203); Washington, D.C.
12/22/2015*; 2:00 pm		at Pittsburgh	L 58–76	2–9	Peterson Events Center (605); Pittsburgh
Patriot League regular season
12/30/2015; 4:30 pm		at Loyola (MD)	L 46–52	2–10 (0–1)	Reitz Arena (787); Baltimore
01/02/2016; 4:00 pm		at Colgate	W 49–37	3–10 (1–1)	Cotterell Court (449); Hamilton, New York
01/06/2016; 7:00 pm		Bucknell	L 60–66	3–11 (1–2)	Bender Arena (165); Washington, D.C.
01/09/2016; 2:00 pm		at Lehigh	W 59–55	4–11 (2–2)	Stabler Arena (694); Bethlehem, Pennsylvania
01/13/2016; 7:00 pm		at Boston University	L 59–63	4–12 (2–3)	Case Gym (159); Boston
01/16/2016; 2:00 pm		Army	L 42–52	4–13 (2–4)	Bender Arena (607); Washington, D.C.
01/20/2016; 7:00 pm		Lafayette	L 51–60	4–14 (2–5)	Bender Arena (160); Washington, D.C.
01/26/2016; 7:00 pm		at Holy Cross	L 54–59	4–15 (2–6)	Hart Center (889); Worcester, Massachusetts
01/30/2016; 2:00 pm		Colgate	W 64–56	5–15 (3–6)	Bender Arena (244); Washington, D.C.
02/03/2016; 7:00 pm		at Bucknell	L 54–60 ^{OT}	5–16 (3–7)	Sojka Pavilion (523); Lewisburg, Pennsylvania
02/06/2016; 2:00 pm		Lehigh	L 52–61	5–17 (3–8)	Bender Arena (353); Washington, D.C.
02/10/2016; 7:00 pm		Boston University	W 79–33	6–17 (4–8)	Bender Arena (311); Washington, D.C.
02/13/2016; 3:00 pm		Army	L 51–87	6–18 (4–9)	Christl Arena (937); West Point, New York
02/17/2016; 7:00 pm		at Lafayette	L 49–63	6–19 (4–10)	Kirby Sports Center (344); Easton, Pennsylvania
02/20/2016; 2:00 pm		Holy Cross	L 50–59	6–20 (4–11)	Bender Arena (298); Washington, D.C.
02/24/2016; 7:00 pm		at Navy	L 52–65	6–21 (4–12)	Alumni Hall (1,015); Annapolis, Maryland
02/27/2016; 4:00 pm		Loyola (MD)	L 50–55	6–22 (4–13)	Bender Arena (316); Washington, D.C.
03/02/2016; 7:00 pm		Navy	W 61–56	7–22 (5–13)	Bender Arena (183); Washington, D.C.
Patriot League Women's Tournament
03/05/2016; 2:00 pm		Boston University; First Round	W 61–53	8–22	Bender Arena (177); Washington, D.C.
03/07/2016; 7:00 pm		at Bucknell; Quarterfinals	L 65–73	8–23	Sojka Pavilion; Lewisburg, Pennsylvania
*Non-conference game. ^{#}Rankings from AP poll. (#) Tournament seedings in parentheses. All times are in Eastern Time.

== See also ==
- 2015–16 American Eagles men's basketball team
