= 2016 Patriot League women's basketball tournament =

- Classification: Division I
- Season: 2015–16
- Teams: 10
- Site: Campus sites
- Champions: Army (3rd title)
- Winning coach: Dave Magarity (3rd title)
- MVP: Kelsey Minato (Army)
- Television: PLN, CBSSN

2015–16 Patriot League women's basketball standings
	Conf.				Overall
Team	W		L	PCT	W		L	PCT
Army †	17	–	1	.944	29	–	3	.906
Bucknell	17	–	1	.944	25	–	8	.758
Loyola (MD)	11	–	7	.611	16	–	16	.500
Lehigh	10	–	8	.556	18	–	13	.581
Holy Cross	10	–	8	.556	13	–	17	.433
Navy	9	–	9	.500	15	–	15	.500
American	5	–	13	.278	8	–	23	.258
Colgate	4	–	14	.222	7	–	23	.233
Lafayette	4	–	14	.222	6	–	23	.207
Boston University	3	–	15	.167	3	–	27	.100
† 2016 Patriot League tournament winner As of March 19, 2016; Rankings from AP poll

The 2016 Patriot League women's basketball tournament was held March 5, 7, 11 and 12 at campus sites of the higher seed. Army defeated Loyola (MD) to win their third Patriot League title and earn an automatic trip to the NCAA women's tournament.

== Seeds ==
Teams are seeded by conference record, with ties broken in the following order:

- Head-to-head record between the teams involved in the tie
- Record against the highest-seeded team not involved in the tie, going down through the seedings as necessary
- Higher RPI entering the tournament, as published by College Basketball News

Seed	School	Conference	Overall	Tiebreaker
1	Army	17–1	26–2	Higher RPI as of March 3
2	Bucknell	17–1	23–6	
3	Loyola (MD)	11–7	14–15	
4	Lehigh	10–8	17–12	1–1 vs. Holy Cross, 2–0 vs. Loyola
5	Holy Cross	10–8	14–15	1–1 vs. Lehigh, 0–2 vs. Loyola
6	Navy	9–9	15–14	
7	American	5–13	7–22	
8	Colgate	4–14	6–22	2–0 vs. Lafayette
9	Lafayette	4–14	6–22	0–2 vs. Colgate
10	Boston University	3–15	3–26	

== Schedule ==
Game	Time*	Matchup	Television	Attendance
First round – Saturday, March 5
1	2:00 PM	#10 Boston University at #7 American	PLN	177
2	4:00 PM	#9 Lafayette at #8 Colgate	PLN	717
Quarterfinals – Monday, March 7
3	7:30 PM	#8 Colgate at #1 Army	PLN	641
4	7:00 PM	#5 Holy Cross at #4 Lehigh	PLN	470
5	7:00 PM	#6 Navy at #3 Loyola (MD)	PLN	532
6	7:00 PM	#7 American at #2 Bucknell	PLN	661
Semifinals – Friday, March 11
7	5:00 PM	#4 Lehigh at #1 Army	PLN	
8	7:30 PM	#3 Loyola (MD) at #2 Bucknell	PLN	768
Championship – Saturday, March 12
9	6:00 pm	#3 Loyola (MD) at #1 Army	CBSSN	1,121
*Game times in ET. #-Rankings denote tournament seeding. All games hosted by higher-seeded team.

== Bracket ==
First round March 5 Patriot League Network
8	Colgate	80
9	Lafayette	68
7	American	61
10	Boston University	53

Quarterfinals; March 7 Patriot League Network
1	Army	89
8	Colgate	62
4	Lehigh	64
5	Holy Cross	48
2	Bucknell	73
7	American	65
3	Loyola (MD)	44
6	Navy	42

Semifinals; March 11; Patriot League Network
1	Army	76
4	Lehigh	46
2	Bucknell	53
3	Loyola (MD)	65

Championship; March 12; CBS Sports Network
1	Army	69
3	Loyola (MD)	51
