= 2015–16 Colgate Raiders women's basketball team =

Intercollegiate basketball season

2015–16 Colgate Raiders women's basketball
- Conference: Patriot League
- Record: 7–23 (4–14 Patriot)
- Head coach: Nicci Hays Fort (5th season)
- Assistant coaches: Katherine Menendez; Justin Paluch; Anna Patritto
- Home arena: Cotterell Court

2015–16 Patriot League women's basketball standings
	Conf.				Overall
Team	W		L	PCT	W		L	PCT
Army †	17	–	1	.944	29	–	3	.906
Bucknell	17	–	1	.944	25	–	8	.758
Loyola (MD)	11	–	7	.611	16	–	16	.500
Lehigh	10	–	8	.556	18	–	13	.581
Holy Cross	10	–	8	.556	13	–	17	.433
Navy	9	–	9	.500	15	–	15	.500
American	5	–	13	.278	8	–	23	.258
Colgate	4	–	14	.222	7	–	23	.233
Lafayette	4	–	14	.222	6	–	23	.207
Boston University	3	–	15	.167	3	–	27	.100
† 2016 Patriot League tournament winner As of March 19, 2016; Rankings from AP poll

The 2015–16 Colgate Raiders women's basketball team represented Colgate University during the 2015–16 NCAA Division I women's basketball season. The Raiders, led by fifth year head coach Nicci Hays Fort, played their home games at Cotterell Court and were members of the Patriot League. They finished the season 7–23, 4–14 in Patriot League play to finish in a tie for eighth place. They advanced to the quarterfinals of the Patriot League women's tournament where they lost to Army.

On March 10, 2016, head coach Nicci Hays Fort has resigned. She finished at Colgate with a five year record of 42–110.

== Roster ==
2015–16 Colgate Raiders women's basketball team
Players
Coaches

Pos.	#	Name	Height	Year	Previous school	Hometown
F	0	Mylah Chandler	5 ft 10 in (1.78 m)	Fr	Albany	Albany, NY
G	3	Randyll Butler	5 ft 8 in (1.73 m)	Sr	Marist	Chicago, IL
G	4	Mackenzie Carroll	5 ft 9 in (1.75 m)	Fr	Central Bucks HS West	New Britain, PA
F	5	Chelsey Koren	5 ft 10 in (1.78 m)	Fr	Blairsville	Blairsville, PA
G	11	Kateri Stone	6 ft 1 in (1.85 m)	So	Montini Catholic	Naperville, IL
G	12	Ariel Etheridge	5 ft 8 in (1.73 m)	So	Tabor Academy	Smithfield, RI
G	13	Katie Curtis	5 ft 6 in (1.68 m)	Jr	Lebanon	Lebanon, IN
G	14	Paige Kriftcher	5 ft 9 in (1.75 m)	Sr	Long Island Lutheran HS	Port Washington, NY
C	20	Steph Poland	6 ft 3 in (1.91 m)	Sr	Hathaway Brown	Valley View, OH
F	23	Tori Pozsonyi	6 ft 1 in (1.85 m)	So	Roselle Catholic	Roselle Park, NJ
F	25	Josie Stockill	6 ft 3 in (1.91 m)	Sr	Napier Girls	Napier, NZ
F	33	Julia Barcello	6 ft 0 in (1.83 m)	So	Seton Catholic Prep	Chandler, AZ
F	40	Summer King	6 ft 1 in (1.85 m)	Fr	Walpole	Walpole, MA

Head coach

- Nicci Hays Fort (Loyola (MD))

Assistant coach(es)

- Katherine Menendez (North Central (MN))
- Justin Paluch (Connecticut)
- Anna Patritto (Oakland)

Legend

- (C) Team captain
- (S) Suspended
- (I) Ineligible
- (W) Walk-on
- Injured
- Current redshirt

Roster

== Schedule ==
Date time, TV	Rank^{#}	Opponent^{#}	Result	Record	Site (attendance) city, state
Exhibition
11/06/2015*; 6:00 pm		King's College	W 81–37		Cotterell Court (423); Hamilton, NY
Non-conference regular season
11/15/2015*; 2:00 pm		at Kent State	L 71–76	0–1	MAC Center (521); Kent, OH
11/18/2015*; 8:30 pm		at Cornell	L 60–73	0–2	Newman Arena (312); Ithaca, NY
11/22/2015*; 2:00 pm		Mommouth	L 80–86 ^{OT}	0–3	Cotterell Court (527); Hamilton, NY
11/28/2015*; 8:00 pm		at DePaul	L 46–96	0–4	Phillips-McGrath Arena (2,115); Chicago, IL
12/05/2015*; 2:00 pm		at LIU Brooklyn	W 63–53	1–4	Steinberg Wellness Center (412); Brooklyn, NY
12/07/2015*; 7:00 pm		at Binghamton	L 56–63	1–5	Binghamton University Events Center (1,142); Vestal, NY
12/09/2015*; 7:00 pm, SNY/ESPN3		No. 1 Connecticut	L 50–94	1–6	Cotterell Court (1,782); Hamilton, NY
12/13/2015*; 2:00 pm		Gonzaga	L 50–80	1–7	Cotterell Court (522); Hamilton, NY
12/19/2015*; 4:00 pm		St. Bonaventure	L 38–62	1–8	Cotterell Court (583); Hamilton, NY
12/22/2015; 5:00 pm		at Lafayette	W 72–59	2–8 (1–0)	Kirby Sports Center (377); Easton, PA
12/28/2015*; 5:00 pm		Siena	W 52–50	3–8	Cotterell Court (516); Hamilton, NY
Patriot League regular season
01/02/2016; 4:00 pm		American	L 37–49	3–9 (1–1)	Cotterell Court (449); Hamilton, NY
01/06/2016; 12:00 pm		Holy Cross	L 71–80	3–10 (1–2)	Cotterell Court (1,185); Hamilton, NY
01/09/2016; 4:00 pm		at Navy	L 41–51	3–11 (1–3)	Alumni Hall (657); Annapolis, MD
01/13/2016; 7:00 pm		at Army	L 55–67	3–12 (1–4)	Christl Arena (628); West Point, NY
01/16/2016; 4:00 pm		Bucknell	L 51–71	3–13 (1–5)	Cotterell Court (494); Hamilton, NY
01/20/2016; 7:00 pm		at Boston University	W 72–63	4–13 (2–5)	Case Gym (231); Boston, MA
01/23/2016; 7:00 pm		Loyola (MD)	L 49–65	4–14 (2–6)	Cotterell Court (512); Hamilton, NY
01/30/2016; 2:00 pm		at American	L 56–64	4–15 (2–7)	Bender Arena (244); Washington, D.C.
02/03/2016; 7:00 pm		at Holy Cross	L 61–70	4–16 (2–8)	Hart Center (876); Worcester, MA
02/06/2016; 4:00 pm		Navy	L 58–62	4–17 (2–9)	Cotterell Court (925); Hamilton, NY
02/10/2016; 7:00 pm		Army	L 55–78	4–18 (2–10)	Cotterell Court (481); Hamilton, NY
02/13/2016; 2:00 pm		at Bucknell	L 60–79	4–19 (2–11)	Sojka Pavilion (596); Lewisburg, PA
02/17/2016; 7:00 pm		Boston University	L 58–71	4–20 (2–12)	Cotterell Court (691); Hamilton, NY
02/21/2016; 2:00 pm		at Loyola (MD)	L 38–55	4–21 (2–13)	Reitz Arena (1,236); Baltimore, MD
02/24/2016; 7:00 pm		at Lehigh	L 74–83	4–22 (2–14)	Stabler Arena (547); Bethlehem, PA
02/27/2016; 4:00 pm		Lafayette	W 70–55	5–22 (3–14)	Cotterell Court; Hamilton, NY
03/02/2016; 7:00 pm		Lehigh	W 82–72	6–22 (4–14)	Cotterell Court (717); Hamilton, NY
Patriot League Women's Tournament
03/05/2016; 4:00 pm		Lafayette; First Round	W 80–68	7–22	Cotterell Court (717); Hamilton, NY
03/07/2016; 7:30 pm		at Army; Quarterfinals	L 62–89	7–23	Christl Arena (641); West Point, NY
*Non-conference game. ^{#}Rankings from AP Poll. (#) Tournament seedings in parentheses. All times are in Eastern Time.

== See also ==
- 2015–16 Colgate Raiders men's basketball team
