= United States Military Academy Preparatory School =

Preparatory school for the United States Military Academy

Coordinates: 41.3976485°N 73.9797235°W

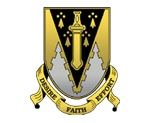
- Motto: Desire · Faith · Effort
- Type: Federal military academy prep school
- Established: 1947
- Commandant: Col. Nathaniel F. Conkey
- Administrative staff: ~100 faculty
- Students: ~240
- Location: West Point, New York, United States
- Campus: United States Military Academy
- Athletics: 15 varsity teams, called "Black Knights"
- Colors: Black █, gray █, and gold █
- Website: United States Military Academy Prep School

The United States Military Academy Preparatory School (USMAPS) is a preparatory school for the United States Military Academy (USMA). It has been located in West Point, New York since 2011.

== History ==
Between the two world wars, the U.S. was divided into nine corps areas, and each of these maintained its own preparatory school, all being supervised by the U.S. Military Academy at West Point staff. In June 1946, USMAPS was founded at Stewart Army Air Field in Newburgh, New York. The school was moved to Fort Belvoir, Virginia, in 1957 and to Fort Monmouth, New Jersey, in 1975. USMAPS moved to West Point 18 July 2011, when the 2005 Base Realignment and Closure Act closed Fort Monmouth.

The USMAPS' official mission is "to provide academic, military and physical instruction in a moral-ethical military environment to prepare and motivate candidates for success at the United States Military Academy."

== Admissions ==
There are two categories of prep school students: Prior Service (PSs) and Invitational Reservists (IRs).

=== Prior Service ===
Prior Service cadet candidates are current or prior service U.S. Army enlisted soldiers aged 17 to 22 who have been admitted to the U.S. Military Academy but choose to take an additional year at the U.S. Military Academy Preparatory School to review high school academic skills.

=== Invitational Reservists ===
Invitational Reservists are persons who have no prior military experience but have been contingently admitted to the U.S. Military Academy — usually due either to being an intercollegiate athlete or having been nominated by a dignitary — conditioned on their ability to improve their academic performance or physical fitness through a period of enrollment at the preparatory school.

Invitational Reservists are admitted solely for the purpose of attending the prep school and have no deployment obligations beyond the confines of campus. Unlike U.S. Military Academy cadets, they are permitted to unilaterally terminate their military enlistment at their leisure and without incurring any financial obligations or future service commitment. Invitational Reservists are not considered veterans until they matriculate to West Point, enter active duty service, and then subsequently leave active duty service. (Note: An exception exists for those who incur a service-connected disability while at USMAPS.) Time spent as USMAPs by Invitational Reservists is considered training, not active duty service.

==== Criticism of Invitational Reservist program ====
The Invitational Reservist program has been criticized as a "scam". Writing in the New York Times, Joe Nocera opined that the military prep schools of the various service branches were a way of recruiting academically unqualified student athletes for intercollegiate play.
