= Loyola Greyhounds women's basketball =

Loyola Greyhounds
2025–26 Loyola Greyhounds women's basketball team
- University: Loyola University Maryland
- Head coach: Danielle O'Banion (5th season)
- Location: Baltimore, Maryland
- Arena: Reitz Arena (capacity: 2,100)
- Conference: Patriot
- Nickname: Greyhounds
- Colors: Green and gray

NCAA Division I tournament appearances
- 1994, 1995

Conference tournament champions
- 1994, 1995

The Loyola Greyhounds women's basketball team represents Loyola University Maryland in NCAA Division I competition. It became a member of the Patriot League along with the university's other intercollegiate athletic programs on July 1, 2013, after leaving the Metro Atlantic Athletic Conference (MAAC), which it had been a member of since 1989.

== Coaching ==
- Danielle O'Banion – Head Coach (since 2021)

== Conference history ==
- ECAC Cosmopolitan: 1985–1986 (5–10 all time conference record)
- ECAC Metro: 1986–1989 (15–33 all time conference record)
- MAAC: 1989–2013 (193–208 all time conference record)
- Patriot League: 2013–present

== Postseason ==
=== NCAA Tournament appearances ===
Year	Round	Opponent	Result/Score
1994	First Round	Virginia	L 72–47
1995	First Round	Oklahoma	L 90–55

=== WNIT appearances ===
Year	Round	Opponent	Result/Score
2011	First Round	Old Dominion	W 67-65
2011	Second Round	Virginia	L 71–49

== Coaching history ==
Stats updated as of the 2020–21 season.

Coach	Years	Record	Conference record	Conference titles
John Schissler	1971–1972	0–4	N/A	
Elizabeth Benedek	1972–1975	22–13	N/A	
James Donahoe, S.J.	1975–1976, 1981–1984	40–56	N/A	
Anne McCloskey	1976–1981	69–54	N/A	
Becky Lovett	1984–1987	17–60	9–22	
Frank Szymanski	1987–1992	24–103	13–53	
Donna Seybold	1992	2–10	2–8	
Pat Coyle	1992–1998	100–77	45–28	2
Cindy Anderson	1998–2001	48–33	33–30	
Candy Cage	2001–2005	47–67	30–42	
Joe Logan	2005–2021	184–287	94–105	
Danielle O'Banion	2021–present	–	–	
Totals		537–764	226–288	2
