= Saint Joseph's Hawks women's basketball =

2026–27 Saint Joseph's Hawks women's basketball team
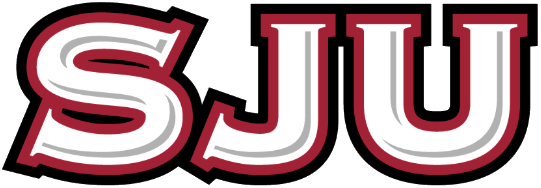
- University: Saint Joseph's University
- First season: 1973; 53 years ago
- Head coach: Cindy Griffin (26th season)
- Location: Philadelphia, Pennsylvania
- Arena: Michael J. Hagan Arena (capacity: 4,200)
- Conference: Atlantic 10
- Nickname: Hawks
- Colors: Crimson and gray

NCAA Division I tournament second round
- 1987, 1988, 1989, 1997, 1999, 2000, 2014

NCAA Division I tournament appearances
- 1985, 1986, 1987, 1988, 1989, 1990, 1994, 1995, 1997, 1999, 2000, 2013, 2014

AIAW tournament appearances
- 1977

Conference tournament champions
- 1997, 1999, 2013

Conference regular-season champions
- 1985, 1989, 1990, 1997, 1999, 2000, 2002, 2003

Uniforms
Home	Away

The Saint Joseph's Hawks women's basketball team represents Saint Joseph's University, Philadelphia, Pennsylvania. The program is classified in the NCAA's Division I, and the team competes in the Atlantic 10 Conference.

== History ==
St. Joseph's began play in 1973. The Hawks have made 22 appearances in the postseason, appearing in the NCAA Tournament 13 times, (1985, 1986, 1987, 1988, 1989, 1990, 1994, 1995, 1997, 1999, 2000, 2013, 2014) and the WNIT ten times (1998, 2002, 2003, 2004, 2006, 2007, 2010, 2011, 2012, 2017). They made the Second Round of the NCAA Tournament in 1987, 1988, 1989, 1997, 1999, 2000, 2014. They have made the Second Round of the WNIT in 1998, 2002, 2003, 2004, 2011, 2012) and the Quarterfinals in 2004. They also participated in the AIAW Eastern Regionals, finishing 3rd in 1976, Sixth in 1977, Third in 1978, and losing in the First Round in 1979.

The Hawks have won the A-10 regular season title in 1985 (shared), 1989, 1990, 1997 (East), 1999 (East), 2000 (East), 2002 (East), and 2003 (East). They have won the A-10 Tournament in 1997, 1999, and 2013, while finishing as runner up in 1987, 1988, 1990, 1991, 1993, 2002, 2004, and 2007. As of the end of the 2015–16 season, the Hawks have an all-time record of 805–434.

== Postseason results ==
=== NCAA Division I ===
Saint Joseph's has made the NCAA Division I women's basketball tournament thirteen times. They have a record of 7–13.

Year	Seed	Round	Opponent	Result
1985	#5	First Round	#4 NC State	L 63–67
1986	#5	Second Round	#4 Western Kentucky	L 65–74
1987	#9	First Round; Second Round	#8 South Alabama #1 Texas	W 67–56 (OT); L 56–86
1988	#7	First Round; Second Round	#10 Bowling Green #2 Maryland	W 68–66; L 67–78
1989	#10	First Round; Second Round	#7 Vanderbilt #2 Long Beach State	W 82–68; L 65–84
1990	#9	First Round	#8 Old Dominion	L 69–91
1994	#11	First Round	#6 Old Dominion	L 55–56
1995	#9	First Round	#8 Virginia Tech	L 52–62
1997	#7	First Round; Second Round	#10 Kansas State #2 Alabama	W 70–52; L 52–61
1999	#11	First Round; Second Round	#6 Tulane #3 Duke	W 83–72; L 60–66
2000	#10	First Round; Second Round	#7 Texas #2 Rutgers	W 69–48; L 39–59
2013	#9	First Round	#8 Vanderbilt	L 54–60
2014	#9	First Round; Second Round	#8 Georgia #1 Connecticut	W 67–57; L 52–91

=== AIAW Division I ===
The Hawks made one appearance in the AIAW National Division I basketball tournament, with a combined record of 1–2.

Year	Round	Opponent	Result
1977	First Round; Consolation First Round; Consolation Second Round	Baylor; Western Washington; Southern Connecticut State	L, 75–85; W, 97–51; L, 85–88
