= 2015–16 Hofstra Pride women's basketball team =

Intercollegiate basketball season

2015–16 Hofstra Pride women's basketball

WNIT, Quarterfinals
- Conference: Colonial Athletic Association
- Record: 25–9 (13–5 CAA)
- Head coach: Krista Kilburn-Steveskey (10th season)
- Assistant coaches: Faisal Khan; Denise King; Michael Gibson
- Home arena: Hofstra Arena

2015–16 CAA women's basketball standings
| | Conf. | | | | Overall |
| Team | W | | L | PCT | W | | L | PCT |
|---|---|---|---|---|---|---|---|---|
| James Madison † | 17 | – | 1 | .944 | 27 | – | 6 | .818 |
| Hofstra | 13 | – | 5 | .722 | 25 | – | 9 | .735 |
| Drexel | 13 | – | 5 | .722 | 19 | – | 14 | .576 |
| Elon | 11 | – | 7 | .611 | 18 | – | 13 | .581 |
| Delaware | 10 | – | 8 | .556 | 16 | – | 15 | .516 |
| Northeastern | 9 | – | 9 | .500 | 15 | – | 16 | .484 |
| William & Mary | 6 | – | 12 | .333 | 15 | – | 15 | .500 |
| College of Charleston | 5 | – | 13 | .278 | 11 | – | 20 | .355 |
| UNC Wilmington | 3 | – | 15 | .167 | 7 | – | 23 | .233 |
| Towson | 3 | – | 15 | .167 | 7 | – | 24 | .226 |
† 2016 CAA tournament winner As of March 28, 2016; Rankings from AP poll

The 2015–16 Hofstra Pride women's basketball team represented Hofstra University during the 2015–16 NCAA Division I women's basketball season. The Pride, led by tenth year head coach Krista Kilburn-Steveskey, played their home games at Hofstra Arena and were members of the Colonial Athletic Association. They finished the season 25–9, 13–5 in CAA play to finish in a tie for second place. They lost in the quarterfinals of the CAA women's tournament to Northeastern. They were invited to the Women's National Invitation Tournament, where they defeated Harvard, Villanova and Virginia in the first, second and third rounds before losing to Florida Gulf Coast in the quarterfinals.

== Previous season ==
They finished last season 20–13, 11–7 in CAA play to finish in a tie for third place. They advanced to the championship game of the 2015 CAA women's basketball tournament where they lost to James Madison. They were invited to the Women's National Invitation Tournament where they lost in the first round to Penn.

== Roster ==
2015–16 Hofstra Pride women's basketball team
Players
Coaches

| Pos. | # | Name | Height | Year | Previous school | Hometown |
|---|---|---|---|---|---|---|
| G | 0 | Kelly Loftus | 5 ft 10 in (1.78 m) | Jr | Mount Vernon | Alexandria, Virginia |
| G | 1 | Asia Jackson | 5 ft 5 in (1.65 m) | Sr | Peekskill | Peekskill, New York |
| G | 2 | Ashunae Durant | 5 ft 10 in (1.78 m) | So | Bloomfield Tech | Newark, New Jersey |
| G | 3 | Sydni Epps | 5 ft 11 in (1.8 m) | Sr | Springside | Cheltenham, Pennsylvania |
| G | 11 | Krystal Luciano | 5 ft 5 in (1.65 m) | Jr | Colegio San Antonio | San Juan, Puerto Rico |
| G | 12 | Darius Faulk | 5 ft 8 in (1.73 m) | Sr | Nazareth/West Virginia | Hempstead, New York |
| G | 13 | Aleana Leon | 5 ft 7 in (1.7 m) | So | Colegio del Sagrado Corazon de Jesus | Ponce, Puerto Rico |
| G | 20 | Anjie White | 6 ft 2 in (1.88 m) | RS Jr | Sanford School/George Washington | Newark, Delaware |
| G | 21 | Jakelle King-Gilchrist | 5 ft 9 in (1.75 m) | Sr | Teaneck/Florida State | Teaneck, New Jersey |
| G | 22 | Olivia Askin | 5 ft 8 in (1.73 m) | So | Shawnee | Medford, New Jersey |
| F | 24 | Dee Thomas-Palmer | 6 ft 0 in (1.83 m) | Sr | William Penn Charter | Philadelphia, Pennsylvania |
| F | 33 | Kayla Minott | 6 ft 3 in (1.91 m) | Fr | St. Peter Catholic High School | Ottawa, Ontario |
| C | 34 | Maeva Dongmo | 6 ft 4 in (1.93 m) | Jr | College Les Sapins/ASA College | Dschang, Cameroon |

Head coach

- Krista Kilburn-Steveskey (NC State)

Assistant coach(es)

- Faisal Khan (UMBC)
- Denise King (Rhode Island)
- Michael Gibson (Boston College)

Legend

- (C) Team captain
- (S) Suspended
- (I) Ineligible
- (W) Walk-on
- Injured
- Current redshirt

Roster

== Schedule ==
| Date time, TV | Rank^{#} | Opponent^{#} | Result | Record | Site (attendance) city, state |
Non-conference regular season
| 11/13/2015*; 5:00 pm | | Navy | W 65–63 | 1–0 | Hofstra Arena; Hempstead, NY |
| 11/17/2015*; 7:00 pm | | Stony Brook | W 71–66 | 2–0 | Hofstra Arena (315); Hempstead, NY |
| 11/19/2015*; 7:00 pm | | at American | W 60–51 | 3–0 | Bender Arena (307); Washington, D.C. |
| 11/24/2015*; 7:00 pm | | at Fairfield | W 67–53 | 4–0 | Alumni Hall (136); Fairfield, CT |
| 11/27/2015*; 1:15 pm | | vs. No. 7 Oregon State; San Juan Shootout | L 50–73 | 4–1 | Mario Morales Coliseum; Guaynabo, PR |
| 11/28/2015*; 11:00 am | | vs. Coastal Carolina; San Juan Shootout | W 82–40 | 5–1 | Morales Coliseum; Guaynabo, PR |
| 12/03/2015*; 7:00 pm | | Buffalo | W 79–36 | 6–1 | Hofstra Arena (157); Hempstead, NY |
| 12/06/2015*; 2:00 pm | | Saint Joseph's | W 75–62 | 7–1 | Hofstra Arena (143); Hempstead, NY |
| 12/09/2015*; 7:00 pm | | at Massachusetts | L 56–57 | 7–2 | Mullins Center (226); Amherst, MA |
| 12/20/2015*; 2:00 pm | | at Marist | W 71–67 | 8–2 | McCann Field House (1,352); Poughkeepsie, NY |
| 12/30/2015*; 3:00 pm | | at Delaware State | W 66–49 | 9–2 | Memorial Hall (181); Dover, DE |
CAA regular season
| 01/03/2016; 2:00 pm | | Delaware | W 58–49 | 10–2 (1–0) | Hofstra Arena (215); Hempstead, NY |
| 01/08/2016; 7:00 pm | | at Elon | L 60–61 | 10–3 (1–1) | Alumni Gym (413); Elon, NC |
| 01/10/2016; 2:00 pm | | at College of Charleston | W 62–58 | 11–3 (2–1) | TD Arena (132); Charleston SC |
| 01/15/2016; 11:30 am | | at UNC Wilmington | W 68–64 | 12–3 (3–1) | Trask Coliseum (3,639); Wilmington, NC |
| 01/17/2016; 1:00 pm, ASN | | William & Mary | W 75–45 | 13–3 (4–1) | Hofstra Arena (252); Hempstead, NY |
| 01/22/2016; 12:00 pm | | Northeastern | W 75–50 | 14–3 (5–1) | Hofstra Arena (1,875); Hempstead, NY |
| 01/24/2016; 2:00 pm | | Towson | W 64–60 | 15–3 (6–1) | Hofstra Arena (145); Hempstead, NY |
| 01/29/2016; 7:00 pm | | at Drexel | L 64–67 | 15–4 (6–2) | Daskalakis Athletic Center (521); Philadelphia, PA |
| 01/31/2016; 2:00 pm | | Elon | W 59–49 | 16–4 (7–2) | Hofstra Arena (245); Hempstead, NY |
| 02/05/2016; 7:00 pm | | James Madison | L 54–71 | 16–5 (7–3) | Hofstra Arena (905); Hempstead, NY |
| 02/07/2016; 1:00 pm | | at Towson | W 74–56 | 17–5 (8–3) | SECU Arena (534); Towson, MD |
| 02/12/2016; 7:00 pm | | William & Mary | W 61–53 | 18–5 (9–3) | Kaplan Arena (479); Williamsburg, VA |
| 02/14/2016; 1:00 pm, ASN | | at James Madison | L 42–57 | 18–6 (9–4) | JMU Convocation Center (4,536); Harrisonburg, VA |
| 02/19/2016; 7:00 pm | | UNC Wilmington | W 62–38 | 19–6 (10–4) | Hofstra Arena (215); Hempstead, NY |
| 02/21/2016; 2:00 pm | | at Delaware | L 47–54 | 19–7 (10–5) | Bob Carpenter Center (1,929); Newark, DE |
| 02/26/2016; 7:00 pm | | Drexel | W 61–54 | 20–7 (11–5) | Hofstra Arena (258); Hempstead, NY |
| 02/28/2016; 2:00 pm | | College of Charleston | W 66–54 | 21–7 (12–5) | Hofstra Arena (480); Hempstead, NY |
| 03/02/2016; 7:00 pm | | at Northeastern | W 71–64 | 22–7 (13–5) | Cabot Center (335); Boston, MA |
CAA Women's Tournament
| 03/17/2016; 7:00 pm, ASN | | vs. Northeastern; Quarterfinals | L 54–65 | 22–8 | Show Place Arena (1,147); Upper Marlboro, MD |
WNIT
| 03/17/2016*; 7:00 pm | | Harvard; First Round | W 76–50 | 23–8 | Hofstra Arena (219); Hempstead, NY |
| 03/19/2016*; 6:00 pm | | at Villanova; Second Round | W 82–74 | 24–8 | The Pavilion (327); Villanova, PA |
| 03/22/2016*; 7:00 pm | | Virginia; Third Round | W 65–57 | 25–8 | Hofstra Arena (344); Hempstead, NY |
| 03/28/2016*; 7:00 pm, ESPN3 | | at Florida Gulf Coast; Quarterfinals | L 46–61 | 25–9 | Alico Arena (3,307); Fort Myers, FL |
*Non-conference game. ^{#}Rankings from AP Poll. (#) Tournament seedings in parentheses. All times are in Eastern Time.

== See also ==
2015–16 Hofstra Pride men's basketball team
