= 2015–16 UNC Wilmington Seahawks women's basketball team =

Intercollegiate basketball season

2015–16 UNC Wilmington Seahawks women's basketball
- Conference: Colonial Athletic Association
- Record: 7–23 (3–15 CAA)
- Head coach: Adell Harris (4th season)
- Assistant coaches: Richard Moore; Kim Tingley; Crystal Riley
- Home arena: Trask Coliseum

2015–16 CAA women's basketball standings
	Conf.				Overall
Team	W		L	PCT	W		L	PCT
James Madison †	17	–	1	.944	27	–	6	.818
Hofstra	13	–	5	.722	25	–	9	.735
Drexel	13	–	5	.722	19	–	14	.576
Elon	11	–	7	.611	18	–	13	.581
Delaware	10	–	8	.556	16	–	15	.516
Northeastern	9	–	9	.500	15	–	16	.484
William & Mary	6	–	12	.333	15	–	15	.500
College of Charleston	5	–	13	.278	11	–	20	.355
UNC Wilmington	3	–	15	.167	7	–	23	.233
Towson	3	–	15	.167	7	–	24	.226
† 2016 CAA tournament winner As of March 28, 2016; Rankings from AP poll

The 2015–16 UNC Wilmington Seahawks women's basketball team represented the University of North Carolina Wilmington during the 2015–16 NCAA Division I women's basketball season. The Seahawks, led by fourth-year head coach Adell Harris, played their home games at the Trask Coliseum and were members of the Colonial Athletic Association (CAA). They finished the season 7–23, 3–15 CAA play to finish in a tie for ninth place. They lost in the first round of the CAA women's tournament to College of Charleston.

== Roster ==
2015–16 UNC Wilmington Seahawks women's basketball team
Players
Coaches

Pos.	#	Name	Height	Year	Previous school	Hometown
G	1	Naqaiyyah Teague	5 ft 7 in (1.7 m)	Jr	Malcolm X Shabazz	Newark, NJ
G	5	Shatia Cole	5 ft 6 in (1.68 m)	RS Sr	Myrtle Beach; Coastal Carolina	Myrtle Beach, SC
G	10	Madison Raque	5 ft 8 in (1.73 m)	So	Eastern	Louisville, KY
G	11	Jasmine Steele	5 ft 1 in (1.55 m)	RS Jr	Midfield; Alabama	Birmingham, AL
F	12	Janeá Williams (I) (redshirt)	6 ft 3 in (1.91 m)	Jr	Pinecrest; North Florida	Pinehurst, NC
F	20	Jordan Henry	6 ft 3 in (1.91 m)	RS Jr	Marvin Ridge; Iona	Waxhaw, NC
F	21	Jenny DeGraaf (I) (redshirt)	6 ft 1 in (1.85 m)	Jr	Springboro; Penn State	Springboro, OH
G	22	Amber Reeves	5 ft 9 in (1.75 m)	Jr	North Cobb	Marietta, GA
G	24	Emily Thomas	5 ft 6 in (1.68 m)	Fr	Pickerington North	Pickerington, OH
C	32	Rebekah Banks	6 ft 1 in (1.85 m)	So	Cary Academy	Durham, NC
F	45	Ryan Flowers	6 ft 2 in (1.88 m)	Jr	Millbrook	Hickory, NC

Head coach

- Adell Harris (Wake Forest)

Assistant coach(es)

- Richard Moore (Fairleigh Dickinson)
- Kim Tingley (Delaware)
- Crystal Riley (Kentucky)

Legend

- (C) Team captain
- (S) Suspended
- (I) Ineligible
- (W) Walk-on
- Injured
- Current redshirt

Roster
Last update: July 13, 2024

== Schedule ==
Date time, TV	Rank^{#}	Opponent^{#}	Result	Record	Site (attendance) city, state
Exhibition
11/07/2015*; 2:00 p.m.		Mount Olive	W 81–80 ^{OT}	1–0	Trask Coliseum (572); Wilmington, NC
Non-conference regular season
11/15/2015*; 2:00 p.m.		UNC Pembroke	W 68–43	1–0	Trask Coliseum (549); Wilmington, NC
11/23/2015*; 7:00 p.m.		at Richmond	L 53–63	1–1	Robins Center (745); Richmond, VA
11/27/2015*; 2:00 p.m.		Jacksonville; UNCW Hampton Inn Thanksgiving Classic	W 51–49	2–1	Trask Coliseum (344); Wilmington, NC
11/28/2015*; 2:00 p.m.		Davidson; UNCW Hampton Inn Thanksgiving Classic	L 50–77	2–2	Trask Coliseum (327); Wilmington, NC
12/02/2015*; 7:00 p.m.		at VCU	L 45–58	2–3	Siegel Center (365); Richmond, VA
12/13/2015*; 6:00 p.m.		at Norfolk State	W 61–57	3–3	Joseph G. Echols Memorial Hall (735); Norfolk, VA
12/15/2015*; 11:30 a.m.		Stetson	L 49–52	3–4	Trask Coliseum (4,893); Wilmington, NC
12/18/2015*; 2:00 p.m.		Ohio; Seahawks Hampton Inn Christmas Invitational	L 59–75	3–5	Trask Coliseum (364); Wilmington, NC
12/19/2015*; 2:00 p.m.		Chattanooga; Seahawks Hampton Inn Christmas Invitational	L 33–61	3–6	Trask Coliseum (417); Wilmington, NC
12/29/2015*; 3:00 p.m., ESPN3		at North Florida	W 63–47	4–6	UNF Arena (214); Jacksonville, FL
12/31/2015*; 2:00 p.m.		at No. 12 Duke	L 56–78	4–7	Cameron Indoor Stadium (3,844); Durham, NC
CAA regular season
01/03/2016; 2:00 p.m.		Elon	L 60–67	4–8 (0–1)	Trask Coliseum (441); Wilmington, NC
01/08/2016; 7:00 p.m.		at Delaware	L 59–67	4–9 (0–2)	Bob Carpenter Center (1,541); Newark, DE
01/10/2016; 1:00 p.m.		at Towson	W 52–49	5–9 (1–2)	SECU Arena (594); Towson, MD
01/15/2016; 11:30 a.m.		Hofstra	L 64–68	5–10 (1–3)	Trask Coliseum (3,639); Wilmington, NC
01/17/2016; 2:00 p.m.		College of Charleston	L 53–64	5–11 (1–4)	Trask Coliseum (422); Wilmington, NC
01/22/2016; 7:00 p.m.		at William & Mary	L 65–77	5–12 (1–5)	Kaplan Arena (347); Williamsburg, VA
01/26/2016; 7:00 p.m.		at Elon	L 53–70	5–13 (1–6)	Alumni Gym (469); Elon, NC
01/29/2016; 7:00 p.m.		Towson	W 53–51	6–13 (2–6)	Trask Coliseum (413); Wilmington, NC
01/31/2016; 2:00 p.m.		at James Madison	L 40–60	6–14 (2–7)	JMU Convocation Center (2,353); Harrisonburg, VA
02/05/2016; 7:00 p.m.		Drexel	L 57–71	6–15 (2–8)	Trask Coliseum (616); Wilmington, NC
02/07/2016; 2:00 p.m.		William & Mary	W 59–44	7–15 (3–8)	Trask Coliseum (332); Wilmington, NC
02/12/2016; 7:00 p.m.		Northeastern	L 66–74	7–16 (3–9)	Trask Coliseum (374); Wilmington, NC
02/14/2016; 2:00 p.m.		at Drexel	L 60–66	7–17 (3–10)	Daskalakis Athletic Center (506); Philadelphia, PA
02/19/2016; 7:00 p.m.		Hofstra	L 38–62	7–18 (3–11)	Hofstra Arena (215); Hempstead, NY
02/21/2016; 2:00 p.m.		at Northeastern	L 52–69	7–19 (3–12)	Cabot Center (326); Boston, MA
02/26/2016; 7:00 p.m.		James Madison	L 41–77	7–20 (3–13)	Trask Coliseum (346); Wilmington, NC
02/28/2016; 2:00 p.m.		Delaware	L 44–56	7–21 (3–14)	Trask Coliseum (338); Wilmington, NC
03/02/2016; 6:30 p.m.		at College of Charleston	L 24–68	7–22 (3–15)	TD Arena (109); Charleston, SC
CAA women's tournament
03/09/2016; 12:00 p.m.		vs. College of Charleston; First round	L 62–71	7–23	Show Place Arena; Upper Marlboro, MD
*Non-conference game. ^{#}Rankings from AP poll. (#) Tournament seedings in parentheses. All times are in Eastern.

== See also ==
- 2015–16 UNC Wilmington Seahawks men's basketball team
