= 2015–16 Drexel Dragons women's basketball team =

American college basketball season

2015–16 Drexel Dragons women's basketball

WNIT, First Round
- Conference: Colonial Athletic Association
- Record: 19–14 (13–5 CAA)
- Head coach: Denise Dillon (13th season)
- Assistant coaches: Amy Mallon; Stacy McCullough; Michelle Baker
- Home arena: Daskalakis Athletic Center

2015–16 CAA women's basketball standings
| | Conf. | | | | Overall |
| Team | W | | L | PCT | W | | L | PCT |
|---|---|---|---|---|---|---|---|---|
| James Madison † | 17 | – | 1 | .944 | 27 | – | 6 | .818 |
| Hofstra | 13 | – | 5 | .722 | 25 | – | 9 | .735 |
| Drexel | 13 | – | 5 | .722 | 19 | – | 14 | .576 |
| Elon | 11 | – | 7 | .611 | 18 | – | 13 | .581 |
| Delaware | 10 | – | 8 | .556 | 16 | – | 15 | .516 |
| Northeastern | 9 | – | 9 | .500 | 15 | – | 16 | .484 |
| William & Mary | 6 | – | 12 | .333 | 15 | – | 15 | .500 |
| College of Charleston | 5 | – | 13 | .278 | 11 | – | 20 | .355 |
| UNC Wilmington | 3 | – | 15 | .167 | 7 | – | 23 | .233 |
| Towson | 3 | – | 15 | .167 | 7 | – | 24 | .226 |
† 2016 CAA tournament winner As of March 28, 2016; Rankings from AP poll

The 2015–16 Drexel Dragons women's basketball team represent Drexel University during the 2015–16 NCAA Division I women's basketball season. The Dragons, led by thirteenth year head coach Denise Dillon, play their home games at the Daskalakis Athletic Center and were members of the Colonial Athletic Association.

They finished the season 19–14, 13–5 in CAA play to finish in second place. They advanced to the championship game of the CAA women's tournament where they lost to James Madison. They were invited to the Women's National Invitational Tournament where they lost to Temple in the first round.

== Roster ==
2015–16 Drexel Dragons women's basketball team
Players
Coaches

| Pos. | # | Name | Height | Year | Previous school | Hometown |
|---|---|---|---|---|---|---|
| F | 10 | Eline Maesschalck | 5 ft 11 in (1.8 m) | Fr | KA Redingenhof | Aalst, Belgium |
| G | 11 | Aubree Brown | 5 ft 11 in (1.8 m) | Fr | Archbishop Wood | Philadelphia |
| G/F | 14 | Sara Woods | 5 ft 10 in (1.78 m) | So | Good Counsel | Olney, Maryland |
| G | 15 | Carrie Alexander | 5 ft 7 in (1.7 m) | Sr | Bishop McNamara | Bowie, Maryland |
| G | 20 | Jessie Pellechio | 5 ft 6 in (1.68 m) | RS Jr | North Hunterdon/VCU | Lebanon, New Jersey |
| G | 21 | Megan Marecic (redshirt) | 5 ft 11 in (1.8 m) | So | Bethel Park | Bethel Park, Pennsylvania |
| G | 22 | Meghan Creighton | 5 ft 7 in (1.7 m) | RS Jr | Archbishop Carroll | West Chester, Pennsylvania |
| G | 23 | Alexis Smith | 5 ft 6 in (1.68 m) | Jr | Calvert | Lusby, Maryland |
| G | 24 | Rachel Pearson | 5 ft 11 in (1.8 m) | Sr | Archbishop Carroll | West Chester, Pennsylvania |
| F | 25 | Kelsi Lidge | 5 ft 8 in (1.73 m) | So | Regis Jesuit | Aurora, Colorado |
| F | 33 | Sarah Curran | 5 ft 11 in (1.8 m) | Jr | Archbishop Carroll | Media, Pennsylvania |
| C | 34 | Tereza Kracikova | 6 ft 2 in (1.88 m) | Fr | Gymnazium Pripotocni | Prague, Czech Republic |
| F | 53 | April Henson | 5 ft 9 in (1.75 m) | So | South County | Lorton, Virginia |

Head coach

- Denise Dillon (Villanova)

Assistant coach(es)

- Amy Mallon (Saint Joseph's)
- Stacy McCullough (Drexel)
- Michelle Baker (Saint Joseph's)

Legend

- (C) Team captain
- (S) Suspended
- (I) Ineligible
- (W) Walk-on
- Injured
- Current redshirt

Roster
Last update: Sep 8, 2015

== Schedule ==
| Date time, TV | Rank^{#} | Opponent^{#} | Result | Record | High points | High rebounds | High assists | Site (attendance) city, state |
Exhibition
| August 21, 2015*; 2:00 pm | | at Biddenland | W 77–49 | 1–0 | 16 – Pellechio | 6 – Pellechio | 3 – Creighton | De Driesprong; Rotterdam, Netherlands |
| August 23, 2015*; 11:00 am | | at Waregem | W 85–74 | 2–0 | 21 – Pellechio | 8 – Pellechio | 5 – Creighton | Sporthal De Treffer; Waregem, Belgium |
| August 24, 2015*; 2:00 pm | | at Sparta Laarne | W 96–45 | 3–0 | 16 – Pellechio | – | 5 – Alexander | Sporthal De Treffer; Waregem, Belgium |
| August 27, 2015*; 1:00 pm | | at Franconville | W 74–66 | 4–0 | 29 – Pellechio | 7 – Schluth | 6 – Smith | Franconville CSL; Franconville, France |
| October 31, 2015*; 12:00 pm | | Bloomsburg | W 63–41 | 5–0 | 18 – Schluth | 6 – Lidge | 5 – Creighton | Daskalakis Athletic Center; Philadelphia |
Non-conference regular season
| November 13, 2015*; 7:00 pm | | Dartmouth; Preseason WNIT First Round | W 69–53 | 1–0 | 21 – Pearson | 12 – Schluth | 8 – Creighton | Daskalakis Athletic Center (1,143); Philadelphia |
| November 15, 2015*; 4:00 pm | | at No. 20 South Florida; Preseason WNIT Second Round | L 58–73 | 1–1 | 15 – Tied | 9 – Kracikova | 6 – Creighton | USF Sun Dome (1,790); Tampa, Florida |
| November 21, 2015*; 5:00 pm | | St. Bonaventure; Preseason WNIT consolation round | W 58–46 | 2–1 | 23 – Curran | 7 – Curran | 5 – Creighton | Daskalakis Athletic Center (1,479); Philadelphia |
| November 28, 2015*; 2:00 pm | | vs. Villanova; Lehigh Christmas City Classic semifinals | L 55–67 | 2–2 | 14 – Pearson | 9 – Smith | 6 – Creighton | Stabler Arena (473); Bethlehem, Pennsylvania |
| November 29, 2015*; 12:00 pm | | vs. Montana; Lehigh Christmas City Classic 3rd place | L 50–58 | 2–3 | 13 – Curran | 6 – Lidge | 7 – Crieghton | Stabler Arena (234); Bethlehem, Pennsylvania |
| December 3, 2015*; 7:00 pm | | Vanderbilt | L 64–74 | 2–4 | 23 – Curran | 6 – Lidge | 8 – Creighton | Daskalakis Athletic Center (539); Philadelphia |
| December 5, 2015*; 4:00 pm | | Hampton | W 57–36 | 3–4 | 16 – Pearson | 9 – Curran | 7 – Creighton | Hampton Convocation Center (1,011); Hampton, Virginia |
| December 13, 2015*; 2:00 pm | | at Saint Joseph's | L 46–53 | 3–5 | 20 – Pearson | 7 – Kracikova | 3 – Creighton | Hagan Arena (1,085); Philadelphia |
| December 19, 2015*; 12:00 pm | | at Penn; Battle of 33rd Street | L 67–72 | 3–6 | 17 – Pearson | 8 – Lidge | 5 – Alexander | The Palestra (1,407); Philadelphia |
| December 21, 2015*; 2:00 pm | | Quinnipiac | W 62–49 | 4–6 | 22 – Curran | 12 – Curran | 17 – Creighton | Daskalakis Athletic Center (508); Philadelphia |
| December 29, 2015*; 7:00 pm | | at Syracuse | L 62–83 | 4–7 | 22 – Pearson | 6 – Schluth | 8 – Creighton | Carrier Dome (567); Syracuse, New York |
CAA regular season
| January 3, 2016; 2:00 pm | | College of Charleston | W 66–54 | 5–7 (1–0) | 28 – Pearson | 6 – Tied | 11 – Creighton | Daskalakis Athletic Center (703); Philadelphia |
| January 8, 2016; 7:00 pm | | Northeastern | L 65–73 | 5–8 (1–1) | 15 – Creighton | 6 – Creighton | 5 – Creighton | Daskalakis Athletic Center (570); Philadelphia |
| January 10, 2016; 2:00 pm | | at William & Mary | W 67–50 | 6–8 (2–1) | 31 – Curran | 9 – Creighton | 10 – Creighton | Kaplan Arena (572); Williamsburg, Virginia |
| January 15, 2016; 7:00 pm | | at James Madison | L 56–67 | 6–9 (2–2) | 11 – Tied | 6 – Kracikova | 4 – Creighton | JMU Convocation Center (2,495); Harrisonburg, Virginia |
| January 17, 2016; 2:00 pm | | Elon | W 74–31 | 7–9 (3–2) | 22 – Curran | 6 – Curran | 7 – Creighton | Daskalakis Athletic Center (916); Philadelphia |
| January 22, 2016; 7:00 pm | | at Delaware | W 54–53 | 8–9 (4–2) | 21 – Curran | 7 – Creighton | 4 – Creighton | Bob Carpenter Center (1,567); Newark, Delaware |
| January 25, 2016; 7:00 pm | | at Northeastern | W 53–49 | 9–9 (5–2) | 17 – Creighton | 7 – Curran | 6 – Curran | Cabot Center (319); Boston |
| January 29, 2016; 7:00 pm | | Hofstra | W 67–64 | 10–9 (6–2) | 16 – Creighton | 8 – Schluth | 8 – Creighton | Daskalakis Athletic Center (521); Philadelphia |
| January 31, 2016; 5:00 pm, ASN | | Delaware | W 47–43 | 11–9 (7–2) | 16 – Curran | 5 – Schluth | 6 – Creighton | Daskalakis Athletic Center (614); Philadelphia |
| February 5, 2016; 7:00 pm | | at UNC Wilmington | W 71–57 | 12–9 (8–2) | 21 – Curran | 8 – Creighton | 6 – Creighton | Trask Coliseum (616); Wilmington, North Carolina |
| February 7, 2016; 2:00 pm | | at College of Charleston | L 46–49 | 12–10 (8–3) | 10 – Creighton | 6 – Tied | 7 – Curran | TD Arena (239); Charleston, South Carolina |
| February 12, 2016; 7:00 pm | | James Madison | L 55–59 | 12–11 (8–4) | 22 – Curran | 11 – Curran | 4 – Creighton | Daskalakis Athletic Center (1,016); Philadelphia |
| February 14, 2016; 2:00 pm | | UNC Wilmington | W 66–60 | 13–11 (9–4) | 14 – Pellechio | 5 – Creighton | 8 – Creighton | Daskalakis Athletic Center (506); Philadelphia |
| February 19, 2016; 7:00 pm | | Towson | W 56–40 | 14–11 (10–4) | 10 – Schluth | 6 – Schluth | 9 – Creighton | Daskalakis Athletic Center (908); Philadelphia |
| February 21, 2016; 3:00 pm, ASN | | at Elon | W 54–47 | 15–11 (11–4) | 23 – Curran | 8 – Curran | 4 – Creighton | Alumni Gym (527); Elon, North Carolina |
| February 26, 2016; 7:00 pm | | at Hofstra | L 54–61 | 15–12 (11–5) | 20 – Pellechio | 6 – Tied | 4 – Pellechio | Hofstra Arena (258); Hempstead, New York |
| February 28, 2016; 2:00 pm | | William & Mary | W 69–53 | 16–12 (12–5) | 21 – Pellechio | 7 – Tied | 5 – Pellechio | Daskalakis Athletic Center (903); Philadelphia |
| March 2, 2016; 7:00 pm | | at Towson | W 74–33 | 17–12 (13–5) | 13 – Curran | 9 – Alexander | 4 – Schluth | SECU Arena (520); Towson, Maryland |
CAA Tournament
| March 10, 2016; 5:00 pm, ASN | (2) | vs. (10) Towson; Quarterfinals | W 71–54 | 18–12 | 17 – Curran | 5 – Tied | 5 – Creighton | Show Place Arena (1,147); Upper Marlboro, Maryland |
| March 11, 2016; 4:00 pm, CSN | (2) | vs. (6) Northeastern; Semifinals | W 58–45 | 19–12 | 14 – Pellechio | 6 – Pellechio | 4 – Curran | Show Place Arena (1,216); Upper Marlboro, Maryland |
| March 12, 2016; 4:00 pm, CSN | (2) | vs. (1) James Madison; Championship | L 46–60 | 19–13 | 8 – Schluth | 5 – Tied | 3 – Tied | Show Place Arena (1,207); Upper Marlboro, Maryland |
WNIT
| March 18, 2016*; 7:00 pm | | Temple; First Round | L 66–74 | 19–14 | 24 – Curran | 5 – Smith | 7 – Creighton | Daskalakis Athletic Center (641); Philadelphia |
*Non-conference game. ^{#}Rankings from AP. (#) Tournament seedings in parentheses. All times are in Eastern Time.

== See also ==
2015–16 Drexel Dragons men's basketball team
