= 2015–16 William & Mary Tribe women's basketball team =

Intercollegiate basketball season

2015–16 William & Mary Tribe women's basketball
- Conference: Colonial Athletic Association
- Record: 15–15 (6–12 CAA)
- Head coach: Ed Swanson (3rd season)
- Assistant coaches: Jeanette Wedo; Millette Green; Kelly Killion
- Home arena: Kaplan Arena

2015–16 CAA women's basketball standings
	Conf.				Overall
Team	W		L	PCT	W		L	PCT
James Madison †	17	–	1	.944	27	–	6	.818
Hofstra	13	–	5	.722	25	–	9	.735
Drexel	13	–	5	.722	19	–	14	.576
Elon	11	–	7	.611	18	–	13	.581
Delaware	10	–	8	.556	16	–	15	.516
Northeastern	9	–	9	.500	15	–	16	.484
William & Mary	6	–	12	.333	15	–	15	.500
College of Charleston	5	–	13	.278	11	–	20	.355
UNC Wilmington	3	–	15	.167	7	–	23	.233
Towson	3	–	15	.167	7	–	24	.226
† 2016 CAA tournament winner As of March 28, 2016; Rankings from AP poll

The 2015–16 William & Mary Tribe women's basketball team represented The College of William & Mary during the 2015–16 NCAA Division I women's basketball season. The Tribe, led by third year head coach Ed Swanson, played their home games at Kaplan Arena and were members of the Colonial Athletic Association. They finished the season 15–15, 6–12 CAA play to finish in seventh place. They lost in the first round of the CAA women's tournament to Towson.

== Roster ==
2015–16 William & Mary Tribe women's basketball team
Players
Coaches

Pos.	#	Name	Height	Year	Previous school	Hometown
G	1	Latrice Hunter	5 ft 5 in (1.65 m)	Jr	Norfolk Christian	Norfolk, Virginia
G	2	Bianca Boggs	5 ft 8 in (1.73 m)	Fr	St. Mary's Ryken	Waldorf, Maryland
F	3	Kasey Curtis	6 ft 2 in (1.88 m)	Jr	Paul VI	Manassas, Virginia
G/F	4	Jeanne Gaumont	6 ft 0 in (1.83 m)	So	Champlain College Saint-Lambert	Saint-Lambert, QE, Canada
G/F	5	Misha Jones	5 ft 9 in (1.75 m)	Fr	Battlefield	Manassas Park, Virginia
F	11	Alexandra Masaquel	5 ft 10 in (1.78 m)	Jr	ʻIolani School	Honolulu, HI
F	12	Jenna Green	5 ft 7 in (1.7 m)	So	Centerville	Clifton, Virginia
G	13	Marlena Tremba	5 ft 9 in (1.75 m)	Jr	Paul VI	Vienna, Virginia
C	20	Chandler Smith	6 ft 3 in (1.91 m)	Fr	St. Mary's Ryken	Port Tobacco, Maryland
F	21	Jenna Carroll	6 ft 1 in (1.85 m)	So	Methacton	Norristown, Pennsylvania
C	24	Abby Rendle	6 ft 4 in (1.93 m)	So	South Lakes	Reston, Virginia
G	32	Brooke Stewart	6 ft 0 in (1.83 m)	Sr	Masconomet Regional	Topsfield, Massachusetts
F	42	Ali Engelhardt	6 ft 1 in (1.85 m)	Fr	Mt. Carmel	San Diego

Head coach

- Ed Swanson (Sacred Heart)

Assistant coach(es)

- Millette Green (UMBC)
- Kelly Killion (Holy Family)
- Jeanette Wedo (San Diego)

Legend

- (C) Team captain
- (S) Suspended
- (I) Ineligible
- (W) Walk-on
- Injured
- Current redshirt

Roster

== Schedule ==
Date time, TV	Rank^{#}	Opponent^{#}	Result	Record	Site (attendance) city, state
Non-conference regular season
11/13/2015*; 7:00 pm		at Mount St. Mary's	W 76–74	1–0	Knott Arena (450); Emmitsburg, Maryland
11/16/2015*; 7:00 pm		Grambling State	W 74–55	2–0	Kaplan Arena (553); Williamsburg, Virginia
11/20/2015*; 7:00 pm		at Richmond	L 50–56	2–1	Robins Center (879); Richmond, Virginia
11/23/2015*; 7:00 pm		at Loyola (MD)	W 62–61	3–1	Reitz Arena (253); Baltimore
11/25/2015*; 5:00 pm		American	W 62–51	4–1	Kaplan Arena; Williamsburg, Virginia
12/01/2015*; 5:30 pm		at Delaware State	W 65–59	5–1	Memorial Hall (357); Dover, Delaware
12/03/2015*; 7:00 pm		Wofford	W 75–55	6–1	Kaplan Arena (309); Williamsburg, Virginia
12/05/2015*; 6:00 pm		at Clemson	W 58–41	7–1	Jervey Athletic Center (222); Clemson, South Carolina
12/17/2015*; 7:00 pm		Norfolk State	W 67–47	8–1	Kaplan Arena (214); Williamsburg, Virginia
12/21/2015*; 7:00 pm		at VCU	L 47–73	8–2	Siegel Center (520); Richmond, Virginia
12/29/2015*; 5:00 pm		Old Dominion; Rivalry	W 75–64	9–2	Kaplan Arena (627); Williamsburg, Virginia
CAA regular season
01/03/2016; 2:00 pm		James Madison	W 65–59 ^{OT}	10–2 (1–0)	Kaplan Arena (741); Williamsburg, Virginia
01/08/2016; 7:00 pm		at Towson	W 73–54	11–2 (2–0)	SECU Arena (485); Towson, Maryland
01/10/2016; 2:00 pm		Drexel	L 50–67	11–3 (2–1)	Kaplan Arena (572); Williamsburg, Virginia
01/15/2016; 7:00 pm		at Northeastern	L 68–69 ^{OT}	11–4 (2–2)	Cabot Center (296); Boston
01/17/2016; 1:00 pm, ASN		at Hofstra	L 45–75	11–5 (2–3)	Hofstra Arena (252); Hempstead, New York
01/22/2016; 7:00 pm		UNC Wilmington	W 77–65	12–5 (3–3)	Kaplan Arena (347); Williamsburg, Virginia
01/26/2016; 7:00 pm		at Delaware	L 63–67	12–6 (3–4)	Bob Carpenter Center (1,481); Newark, Delaware
01/29/2016; 7:00 pm		College of Charleston	L 51–55	12–7 (3–5)	Kaplan Arena (462); Williamsburg, Virginia
01/31/2016; 2:00 pm		Northeastern	W 69–62	13–7 (4–5)	Kaplan Arena (416); Williamsburg, Virginia
02/05/2016; 7:00 pm		at Elon	L 51–73	13–8 (4–6)	Alumni Gym (468); Elon, North Carolina
02/07/2016; 2:00 pm		at UNC Wilmington	L 44–59	13–9 (4–7)	Trask Coliseum (332); Wilmington, North Carolina
02/12/2016; 7:00 pm		Hofstra	L 53–61	13–10 (4–8)	Kaplan Arena (479); Williamsburg, Virginia
02/14/2016; 2:00 pm		Delaware	L 53–69	13–11 (4–9)	Kaplan Arena (564); Williamsburg, Virginia
02/19/2016; 2:00 pm		at James Madison	L 63–83	13–12 (4–10)	JMU Convocation Center (2,428); Harrisonburg, Virginia
02/21/2016; 2:00 pm		at College of Charleston	W 66–40	14–12 (5–10)	TD Arena (306); Charleston, South Carolina
02/26/2016; 7:00 pm		Towson	W 78–65	15–12 (6–10)	Kaplan Arena (536); Williamsburg, Virginia
02/28/2016; 2:00 pm		at Drexel	L 53–69	15–13 (6–11)	Daskalakis Athletic Center (903); Philadelphia
03/02/2016; 7:00 pm		Elon	L 64–74	15–14 (6–12)	Kaplan Arena (381); Williamsburg, Virginia
CAA Women's Tournament
03/09/2016; 2:30 pm		vs. Towson; First Round	L 65–71	15–15	Show Place Arena (509); Upper Marlboro, Maryland
*Non-conference game. ^{#}Rankings from AP Poll. (#) Tournament seedings in parentheses. All times are in Eastern Time.

== See also ==
2015–16 William & Mary Tribe men's basketball team
