= 2015–16 Charleston Cougars women's basketball team =

Intercollegiate basketball season

2015–16 College of Charleston Cougars women's basketball
- Conference: Colonial Athletic Association
- Record: 11–20 (5–13 CAA)
- Head coach: Candice M. Jackson (2nd season)
- Assistant coaches: Bob Clark; Adria Crawford; Darren Guensch
- Home arena: TD Arena

2015–16 CAA women's basketball standings
	Conf.				Overall
Team	W		L	PCT	W		L	PCT
James Madison †	17	–	1	.944	27	–	6	.818
Hofstra	13	–	5	.722	25	–	9	.735
Drexel	13	–	5	.722	19	–	14	.576
Elon	11	–	7	.611	18	–	13	.581
Delaware	10	–	8	.556	16	–	15	.516
Northeastern	9	–	9	.500	15	–	16	.484
William & Mary	6	–	12	.333	15	–	15	.500
College of Charleston	5	–	13	.278	11	–	20	.355
UNC Wilmington	3	–	15	.167	7	–	23	.233
Towson	3	–	15	.167	7	–	24	.226
† 2016 CAA tournament winner As of March 28, 2016; Rankings from AP poll

The 2015–16 College of Charleston Cougars women's basketball team represented the College of Charleston during the 2015–16 NCAA Division I women's basketball season. The Cougars, led by second-year head coach Candice M. Jackson, played their home games at the TD Arena and were members of the Colonial Athletic Association. They finished the season 11–20, 5–13 CAA play to finish in eighth place. They advanced to the quarterfinals of the CAA women's tournament, where they lost to James Madison.

== Roster ==
2015–16 College of Charleston Cougars women's basketball team
Players
Coaches

Pos.	#	Name	Height	Year	Previous school	Hometown
G	1	Nola Henry	5 ft 7 in (1.7 m)	RS Jr	Willingboro; Massachusetts	Willingboro, New Jersey
G	2	Darien Huff	5 ft 8 in (1.73 m)	Fr	Elizabethtown	Elizabethtown, Kentucky
G	3	Shiclasia Brown	5 ft 5 in (1.65 m)	So	Nazareth Regional	Corona, New York
F	12	Jacqueline Luna-Castro	6 ft 2 in (1.88 m)	RS Sr	Boise; UC Santa Barbara	Boise, Idaho
F	14	Courtney Gardner	5 ft 11 in (1.8 m)	Jr	Brookwood	Snellville, Georgia
G	15	Tanisha Brown (I) (redshirt)	5 ft 11 in (1.8 m)	Jr	Myrtle Beach; Charlotte	Loris, South Carolina
F	20	Bri Sullivan	6 ft 1 in (1.85 m)	Fr	Colonial Forge	Ferdericksburg, Virginia
G	21	Shannon Hines	5 ft 7 in (1.7 m)	Sr	R-S Central HS	Spindale, North Carolina
F	24	Breanna Bolden	5 ft 11 in (1.8 m)	Jr	South River HS	Edgewater, Maryland
F	40	Dajan Logan	5 ft 11 in (1.8 m)	Fr	McDonogh	Randallstown, Maryland
F	44	Kelsey Booth (I) (redshirt)	6 ft 0 in (1.83 m)	Sr	East Hampton; Saints	East Hampton, Connecticut

Head coach

Candice M. Jackson (Michigan State)

Assistant coach(es)

Bob Clark (Towson)
Adria Crawford (Georgetown)
Darren Guensch (Radford)

Legend

- (C) Team captain
- (S) Suspended
- (I) Ineligible
- (W) Walk-on
- Injured
- Current redshirt

Roster

== Schedule ==
Date time, TV	Rank^{#}	Opponent^{#}	Result	Record	Site (attendance) city, state
Exhibition
11/06/2015*; 6:30 pm		Georgia Southwestern State	W 79–51		TD Arena; Charleston, South Carolina
Non-conference regular season
11/13/2015*; 4:00 pm		Houston	W 55–48	1–0	TD Arena (681); Charleston, South Carolina
11/16/2015*; 6:00 pm		at Boise State	L 38–61	1–1	Taco Bell Arena; Boise, Idaho
11/18/2015*; 9:00 pm		at Weber State	W 50–42	2–1	Dee Events Center (521); Ogden, Utah
11/22/2015*; 5:00 pm		at Virginia Tech	L 47–81	2–2	Cassell Coliseum (1,136); Blacksburg, Virginia
11/28/2015*; 12:00 pm		Charleston Southern	W 81–66	3–2	TD Arena (212); Charleston, South Carolina
12/02/2015*; 6:30 pm		Appalachian State	W 60–50	4–2	TD Arena (572); Charleston, South Carolina
12/08/2015*; 7:00 pm		at Charlotte	L 61–89	4–3	Dale F. Halton Arena (533); Charlotte, North Carolina
12/18/2015*; 6:30 pm		WKU	L 44–78	4–4	TD Arena (125); Charleston, South Carolina
12/20/2015*; 2:00 pm		Louisville	L 67–71	4–5	TD Arena (517); Charleston, South Carolina
12/22/2015*; 2:00 pm		Winthrop	W 77–63	5–5	TD Arena (274); Charleston, South Carolina
12/30/2015*; 7:00 pm, ESPN3		at Mercer	L 58–66	5–6	Hawkins Arena (376); Macon, Georgia
CAA regular season
01/03/2016; 2:00 pm		at Drexel	L 54–66	5–7 (0–1)	Daskalakis Athletic Center (703); Philadelphia
01/08/2016; 7:00 pm		at James Madison	L 61–83	5–8 (0–2)	JMU Convocation Center (2,202); Harrisonburg, Virginia
01/10/2016; 2:00 pm		Hofstra	L 58–62	5–9 (0–3)	TD Arena (132); Charleston, South Carolina
01/15/2016; 6:30 pm		Delaware	L 47–63	5–10 (0–4)	TD Arena (193); Charleston, South Carolina
01/17/2016; 2:00 pm		at UNC Wilmington	W 64–53	6–10 (1–4)	Trask Coliseum (422); Wilmington, North Carolina
01/22/2016; 7:00 pm		at Elon	L 41–52	6–11 (1–5)	Alumni Gym (650); Elon, North Carolina
01/29/2016; 7:00 pm		at William & Mary	W 55–51	7–11 (2–5)	Kaplan Arena (462); Williamsburg, Virginia
01/31/2016; 2:00 pm		Towson	W 67–55	8–11 (3–5)	TD Arena (267); Charleston, South Carolina
02/05/2016; 6:30 pm		Northeastern	L 49–52	8–12 (3–6)	TD Arena (112); Charleston, South Carolina
02/07/2016; 2:00 pm		Drexel	W 49–46	9–12 (4–6)	TD Arena (239); Charleston, South Carolina
02/12/2016; 7:00 pm		at Delaware	L 55–72	9–13 (4–7)	Bob Carpenter Center (1,619); Newark, New Jersey
02/14/2016; 2:00 pm		at Towson	L 51–62	9–14 (4–8)	SECU Arena (482); Towson, Maryland
02/19/2016; 11:30 am		Elon	L 38–54	9–15 (4–9)	TD Arena (1,759); Charleston, South Carolina
02/21/2016; 2:00 pm		William & Mary	L 40–66	9–16 (4–10)	TD Arena (306); Charleston, South Carolina
02/26/2016; 7:00 pm		at Northeastern	L 66–78	9–17 (4–11)	Cabot Center (258); Boston
02/28/2016; 2:00 pm		at Hofstra	L 54–66	9–18 (4–12)	Hofstra Arena (480); Hempstead, New York
03/02/2016; 6:00 pm		UNC Wilmington	W 68–24	10–18 (5–12)	TD Arena (109); Charleston, South Carolina
03/05/2016; 12:00 pm		James Madison	L 46–76	10–19 (5–13)	TD Arena (91); Charleston, South Carolina
CAA Women's Tournament
03/09/2016; 12:00 pm		vs. UNC Wilmington; First Round	W 71–62	11–19	Show Place Arena; Upper Marlboro, Maryland
03/10/2016; 12:00 pm, ASN		vs. James Madison; Quarterfinals	L 50–53	11–20	Show Place Arena; Upper Marlboro, Maryland
*Non-conference game. ^{#}Rankings from AP Poll. (#) Tournament seedings in parentheses. All times are in Eastern Time.

== See also ==
- 2015–16 Charleston Cougars men's basketball team
