= 2015–16 Elon Phoenix women's basketball team =

Intercollegiate basketball season

2015–16 Elon Phoenix women's basketball
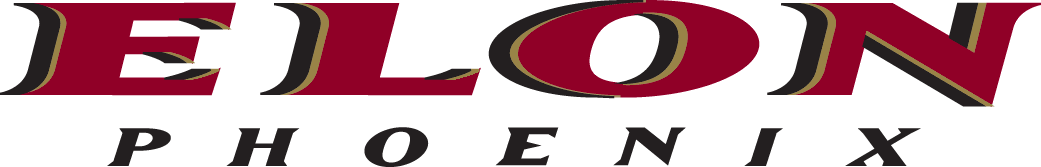

WNIT, First Round
- Conference: Colonial Athletic Association
- Record: 18–13 (11–7 CAA)
- Head coach: Charlotte Smith (5th season)
- Assistant coaches: Cristy McKinney; Josh Wick; Tasha Taylor
- Home arena: Alumni Gym

2015–16 CAA women's basketball standings
	Conf.				Overall
Team	W		L	PCT	W		L	PCT
James Madison †	17	–	1	.944	27	–	6	.818
Hofstra	13	–	5	.722	25	–	9	.735
Drexel	13	–	5	.722	19	–	14	.576
Elon	11	–	7	.611	18	–	13	.581
Delaware	10	–	8	.556	16	–	15	.516
Northeastern	9	–	9	.500	15	–	16	.484
William & Mary	6	–	12	.333	15	–	15	.500
College of Charleston	5	–	13	.278	11	–	20	.355
UNC Wilmington	3	–	15	.167	7	–	23	.233
Towson	3	–	15	.167	7	–	24	.226
† 2016 CAA tournament winner As of March 28, 2016; Rankings from AP poll

The 2015–16 Elon Phoenix women's basketball team represented Elon University during the 2015–16 NCAA Division I women's basketball season. The Phoenix, led by fifth-year head coach Charlotte Smith, played their home games at Alumni Gym and were second-year members of the Colonial Athletic Association. They finished the season 18–13, 11–7 in CAA play to finish in fourth place. They lost in the quarterfinals of the CAA women's tournament to Delaware. They were invited to the Women's National Invitational Tournament, where they lost to Virginia Tech in the first round.

== Roster ==
2015–16 Elon Phoenix women's basketball team
Players
Coaches

Pos.	#	Name	Height	Year	Previous school	Hometown
G	2	Essence Baucom	5 ft 5 in (1.65 m)	RS Jr	Phillip O'Berry Academy; UAB	Charlotte, North Carolina
G	3	Lauren Brown	5 ft 9 in (1.75 m)	Jr	Alpharetta	Alpharetta, Georgia
G	4	Emily Sasser	5 ft 11 in (1.8 m)	So	Apex	Cary, North Carolina
G	5	Shay Burnett	5 ft 9 in (1.75 m)	So	Southern Alamance	Graham, North Carolina
G	10	Lauren Hudson	5 ft 9 in (1.75 m)	Sr	Wakefield	Raleigh, North Carolina
F	11	Jenifer Rhodes	6 ft 0 in (1.83 m)	Jr	Pinewood Prep	North Charleston, South Carolina
G	12	Lenaira Ruffin	5 ft 9 in (1.75 m)	Jr	River Mill	Burlington, North Carolina
G	13	Josepha Mbouma	5 ft 7 in (1.7 m)	Sr	Watkins Mill	Montgomery Village, Maryland
F	14	Mackenzie Darrah	6 ft 4 in (1.93 m)	RS So	Buford	Buford, Georgia
F	15	Nicole Razor	5 ft 6 in (1.68 m)	Sr	Southwest Dekalb	Stone Mountain, Georgia
G	20	Nikki McDonald	6 ft 0 in (1.83 m)	Fr	Wesleyan	Atlanta
G	22	Jessica Farmer	6 ft 0 in (1.83 m)	Sr	Carolina Day	Asheville, North Carolina
F	32	Autumn Carter	6 ft 5 in (1.96 m)	Sr	Rockingham County	Reidsville, North Carolina
G	33	Maddie MaCallie	5 ft 10 in (1.78 m)	RS Jr	Riverside; Miami (OH)	Durham, North Carolina
C	44	Malaya Johnson	6 ft 3 in (1.91 m)	So	North Surry	Mount Airy, North Carolina
F		Meme Garner (I) (redshirt)	6 ft 0 in (1.83 m)	Jr	Jordan-Matthews; Charlotte	Siler City, North Carolina

Head coach

- Charlotte Smith (North Carolina)

Assistant coach(es)

- Cristy McKinney (Western Carolina)
- Josh Wick (North Carolina)
- Tasha Taylor (Clemson)

Legend

- (C) Team captain
- (S) Suspended
- (I) Ineligible
- (W) Walk-on
- Injured
- Current redshirt

Roster

== Schedule ==
Date time, TV	Rank^{#}	Opponent^{#}	Result	Record	Site (attendance) city, state
Exhibition
11/08/2015*; 2:00 pm		Winston-Salem State	W 70–27	1–0	Alumni Gym; Elon, North Carolina
Non-conference regular season
11/14/2015*; 2:00 pm		Lenoir–Rhyne	W 67–29	1–0	Alumni Gym (378); Elon, North Carolina
11/16/2015*; 7:00 pm, ESPN3		at Liberty	L 63–72	1–1	Vines Center (1,550); Lynchburg, Virginia
11/19/2015*; 7:00 pm		Charlotte	W 90–83	2–1	Alumni Gym (423); Elon, North Carolina
11/22/2015*; 7:00 pm		at American	W 62–54	3–1	Bender Arena (240); Washington, D.C.
11/24/2015*; 7:00 pm		at Navy	L 70–73 ^{2OT}	3–2	Alumni Hall (347); Annapolis, Maryland
11/29/2015*; 2:00 pm		East Tennessee State	W 50–38	4–2	Alumni Gym (572); Elon, North Carolina
12/05/2015*; 2:00 pm		at Furman	W 65–55	5–2	Timmons Arena (502); Greenville, North Carolina
12/13/2015*; 2:00 pm		at NC State	W 69–66	6–2	Broughton HS (1,476); Raleigh, North Carolina
12/19/2015*; 3:30 pm		High Point	W 80–69	7–2	Alumni Gym (607); Elon, North Carolina
12/22/2015*; 7:00 pm		at No. 2 South Carolina	L 63–78	7–3	Colonial Life Arena (13,670); Columbia, South Carolina
12/28/2015*; 7:00 pm		at West Virginia	L 57–67	7–4	WVU Coliseum (2,026); Morgantown, West Virginia
CAA regular season
01/03/2016; 2:00 pm		at UNC Wilmington	W 67–60	8–4 (1–0)	Trask Coliseum (441); Wilmington, North Carolina
01/08/2016; 7:00 pm		Hofstra	W 61–60	9–4 (2–0)	Alumni Gym (413); Elon, North Carolina
01/10/2016; 2:00 pm		James Madison	L 76–81 ^{OT}	9–5 (2–1)	Alumni Gym (547); Elon, North Carolina
01/15/2016; 7:00 pm		at Towson	L 78–85	9–6 (2–2)	SECU Arena (453); Towson, Maryland
01/17/2016; 2:00 pm		at Drexel	L 31–74	9–7 (2–3)	Daskalakis Athletic Center (916); Philadelphia
01/22/2016; 7:00 pm		College of Charleston	W 52–41	10–7 (3–3)	Alumni Gym (650); Elon, North Carolina
01/26/2016; 7:00 pm		UNC Wilmington	W 70–53	11–7 (4–3)	Alumni Gym (469); Elon, North Carolina
01/29/2016; 7:00 pm		at Northeastern	W 56–54	12–7 (5–3)	Cabot Center (344); Boston
01/31/2016; 2:00 pm		at Hofstra	L 49–59	12–8 (5–4)	Hofstra Arena (245); Hempstead, New York
02/05/2016; 7:00 pm		William & Mary	W 73–51	13–8 (6–4)	Alumni Gym (468); Elon, North Carolina
02/07/2016; 2:00 pm		at Delaware	W 66–64 ^{OT}	14–8 (7–4)	Bob Carpenter Center (1,744); Newark, Delaware
02/12/2016; 7:00 pm		Towson	W 80–58	15–8 (8–4)	Alumni Gym (473); Elon, North Carolina
02/14/2016; 2:00 pm		Northeastern	L 61–67	15–9 (8–5)	Alumni Gym (402); Elon, North Carolina
02/19/2016; 11:30 am		at College of Charleston	W 54–38	16–9 (9–5)	TD Arena (1,759); Charleston, South Carolina
02/21/2016; 3:00 pm, ASN		Drexel	L 47–54	16–10 (9–6)	Alumni Gym (527); Elon, North Carolina
02/26/2016; 7:00 pm		Delaware	W 62–45	17–10 (10–6)	Alumni Gym (605); Elon, North Carolina
02/28/2016; 2:00 pm		at James Madison	L 72–73	17–11 (10–7)	JMU Convocation Center (4,103); Harrisonburg, Virginia
03/02/2016; 7:00 pm		at William & Mary	W 74–64	18–11 (11–7)	Kaplan Arena (381); Williamsburg, Virginia
CAA Women's Tournament
03/10/2016; 2:30 pm, ASN		vs. Delaware; Quarterfinals	L 50–57	18–12	Show Place Arena; Upper Marlboro, Maryland
WNIT
03/17/2016*; 7:00 pm		at Virginia Tech; First Round	L 59–68	18–13	Cassell Coliseum (657); Blacksburg, Virginia
*Non-conference game. ^{#}Rankings from AP Poll. (#) Tournament seedings in parentheses. All times are in Eastern Time.

== See also ==
- 2015–16 Elon Phoenix men's basketball team
