= 2015–16 James Madison Dukes women's basketball team =

Intercollegiate basketball season

2015–16 James Madison Dukes women's basketball

CAA tournament & regular-season champions

NCAA tournament, first round
- Conference: Colonial Athletic Association
- Record: 27–6 (17–1 CAA)
- Head coach: Kenny Brooks (14th season)
- Assistant coaches: Sean O'Regan; Jennifer Brown; Sarah Williams
- Home arena: JMU Convocation Center

2015–16 CAA women's basketball standings
| | Conf. | | | | Overall |
| Team | W | | L | PCT | W | | L | PCT |
|---|---|---|---|---|---|---|---|---|
| James Madison † | 17 | – | 1 | .944 | 27 | – | 6 | .818 |
| Hofstra | 13 | – | 5 | .722 | 25 | – | 9 | .735 |
| Drexel | 13 | – | 5 | .722 | 19 | – | 14 | .576 |
| Elon | 11 | – | 7 | .611 | 18 | – | 13 | .581 |
| Delaware | 10 | – | 8 | .556 | 16 | – | 15 | .516 |
| Northeastern | 9 | – | 9 | .500 | 15 | – | 16 | .484 |
| William & Mary | 6 | – | 12 | .333 | 15 | – | 15 | .500 |
| College of Charleston | 5 | – | 13 | .278 | 11 | – | 20 | .355 |
| UNC Wilmington | 3 | – | 15 | .167 | 7 | – | 23 | .233 |
| Towson | 3 | – | 15 | .167 | 7 | – | 24 | .226 |
† 2016 CAA tournament winner As of March 28, 2016; Rankings from AP poll

The 2015–16 James Madison Dukes women's basketball team represented James Madison University during the 2015–16 NCAA Division I women's basketball season. The Dukes, led by 14th-year head coach Kenny Brooks, played their home games at the James Madison University Convocation Center in Harrisonburg, Virginia and were members of the Colonial Athletic Association (CAA). They finished the season 27–6, 17–1 in CAA play, to win the CAA regular-season title. They also won the CAA tournament championship and earned an automatic bid to the NCAA women's basketball tournament. They lost in the first round to DePaul.

On March 28, it was announced that Kenny Brooks had accepted a coaching position at Virginia Tech. He finished at James Madison after 14 years with a win–loss record of 337–122 (.734).

== Roster ==
2015–16 James Madison Dukes women's basketball team
Players
Coaches

| Pos. | # | Name | Height | Year | Previous school | Hometown |
|---|---|---|---|---|---|---|
| G | 1 | Elemy Colome | 5 ft 7 in (1.7 m) | Fr | Proctor Academy | Lawrence, MA |
| F | 2 | Destiny Jones | 6 ft 0 in (1.83 m) | Sr | Archbishop McCarthy | Miramar, FL |
| F | 4 | Tasia Butler | 6 ft 1 in (1.85 m) | RS So | North Point; Syracuse | Waldorf, MD |
| G | 5 | Ashley Pérez | 5 ft 8 in (1.73 m) | Sr | Manchester; St. John's | Manchester, CT |
| G | 12 | Precious Hall | 5 ft 8 in (1.73 m) | Sr | Maclay School | Tallahassee, FL |
| G | 13 | Logan Reynolds | 5 ft 7 in (1.7 m) | Fr | Central | Norton, VA |
| G | 14 | Hailee Barron | 5 ft 10 in (1.78 m) | So | Rice | Burlington, VT |
| F/C | 15 | Amber Porter (I) (redshirt) | 6 ft 3 in (1.91 m) | Jr | Potomac; Stetson | Woodbridge, VA |
| G | 22 | Aneah Young | 5 ft 11 in (1.8 m) | Fr | Baltimore Polytechnic Institute | Baltimore, MD |
| G | 24 | Jazmon Gwathmey | 6 ft 2 in (1.88 m) | RS Sr | Liberty | Bealeton, VA |
| C | 31 | Kayla Cooper-Williams | 6 ft 2 in (1.88 m) | Fr | C. D. Hylton | Dumfries, VA |
| G | 32 | Angela Mickens | 5 ft 7 in (1.7 m) | Sr | Robert E. Lee | Staunton, VA |
| C | 40 | Da'Lishia Griffin | 6 ft 2 in (1.88 m) | Jr | Western Branch | Chesapeake, VA |
| F | 42 | Carley Brew | 6 ft 0 in (1.83 m) | So | Wilson | Wyomissing, PA |
| F | 45 | Savannah Felgemacher | 6 ft 3 in (1.91 m) | Fr | Volunteer | Church Hill, TN |

Head coach

- Kenny Brooks (James Madison)

Assistant coach(es)

- Sean O'Regan (James Madison)
- Jennifer Brown (James Madison)
- Sarah Williams (James Madison)

Legend

- (C) Team captain
- (S) Suspended
- (I) Ineligible
- (W) Walk-on
- Injured
- Current redshirt

Roster
Last update: September 30, 2024

== Schedule ==
| Date time, TV | Rank^{#} | Opponent^{#} | Result | Record | Site (attendance) city, state |
Exhibition
| November 9, 2015*; 2:00 p.m. | | Davis & Elkins | W 107–37 | 1–0 | JMU Convocation Center; Harrisonburg, VA |
Non-conference regular season
| November 15, 2015*; 2:00 p.m. | | Longwood | W 88–30 | 1–0 | JMU Convocation Center (2,201); Harrisonburg, VA |
| November 17, 2015*; 2:00 p.m. | | Morgan State | W 92–31 | 2–0 | JMU Convocation Center (2,012); Harrisonburg, VA |
| November 20, 2015*; 10:00 p.m. | | at UCLA | L 61–90 | 2–1 | Pauley Pavilion (840); Los Angeles, CA |
| November 23, 2015*; 7:00 p.m., ESPN3 | | Liberty | W 72–56 | 3–1 | JMU Convocation Center (2,200); Harrisonburg, VA |
| November 29, 2015*; 5:00 p.m. | | at Hampton | W 68–56 ^{OT} | 4–1 | Hampton Convocation Center (1,011); Hampton, VA |
| December 5, 2015*; 7:00 p.m. | | American | W 74–45 | 5–1 | JMU Convocation Center (2,718); Harrisonburg, VA |
| December 7, 2015*; 7:00 p.m. | | at St. Bonaventure | L 45–56 | 5–2 | Reilly Center (518); Olean, NY |
| December 13, 2015*; 2:00 p.m. | | at Richmond | W 73–47 | 6–2 | Robins Center (1,015); Richmond, VA |
| December 20, 2015*; 5:00 p.m. | | vs. West Virginia; Florida Sunshine Classic | L 62–69 | 6–3 | Worden Arena (987); Winter Haven, FL |
| December 21, 2015*; 5:00 p.m. | | vs. No. 4 Baylor; Florida Sunshine Classic | L 63–77 | 6–4 | Worden Arena (932); Winter Haven, FL |
| December 30, 2015*; 7:00 p.m. | | Davidson | W 87–45 | 7–4 | JMU Convocation Center (2,353); Harrisonburg, VA |
CAA regular season
| January 3, 2016; 2:00 p.m. | | at William & Mary | L 59–65 ^{OT} | 7–5 (0–1) | Kaplan Arena (741); Williamsburg, VA |
| January 8, 2016; 7:00 p.m. | | College of Charleston | W 83–61 | 8–5 (1–1) | JMU Convocation Center (2,202); Harrisonburg, VA |
| January 10, 2016; 2:00 p.m. | | at Elon | W 81–76 ^{OT} | 9–5 (2–1) | Alumni Hall (547); Elon, NC |
| January 15, 2016; 7:00 p.m. | | Drexel | W 67–56 | 10–5 (3–1) | JMU Convocation Center (2,495); Harrisonburg, VA |
| January 17, 2016; 2:00 p.m. | | Northeastern | W 85–62 | 11–5 (4–1) | JMU Convocation Center (2,227); Harrisonburg, VA |
| January 22, 2016; 7:00 p.m. | | at Towson | W 64–57 | 12–5 (5–1) | SECU Arena (344); Towson, MD |
| January 29, 2016; 7:00 p.m. | | Delaware | W 75–55 | 13–5 (6–1) | JMU Convocation Center (2,681); Harrisonburg, VA |
| January 31, 2016; 2:00 p.m. | | UNC Wilmington | W 60–40 | 14–5 (7–1) | JMU Convocation Center (2,353); Harrisonburg, VA |
| February 5, 2016; 7:00 p.m. | | at Hofstra | W 71–54 | 15–5 (8–1) | Hofstra Arena (905); Hempstead, NY |
| February 7, 2016; 2:00 p.m. | | at Northeastern | W 61–52 | 16–5 (9–1) | Cabot Center (312); Boston, MA |
| February 12, 2016; 7:00 p.m. | | at Drexel | W 59–55 | 17–5 (10–1) | Daskalakis Athletic Center (1,016); Philadelphia, PA |
| February 14, 2016; 1:00 p.m., ASN | | Hofstra | W 57–42 | 18–5 (11–1) | JMU Convocation Center (4,536); Harrisonburg, VA |
| February 19, 2016; 7:00 p.m. | | William & Mary | W 83–63 | 19–5 (12–1) | JMU Convocation Center (2,428); Harrisonburg, VA |
| February 21, 2016; 2:00 p.m. | | Towson | W 61–45 | 20–5 (13–1) | JMU Convocation Center (2,612); Harrisonburg, VA |
| February 26, 2016; 7:00 p.m. | | at UNC Wilmington | W 77–41 | 21–5 (14–1) | Trask Coliseum (346); Wilmington, NC |
| February 28, 2016; 2:00 p.m. | | Elon | W 73–72 | 22–5 (15–1) | JMU Convocation Center (4,103); Harrisonburg, VA |
| March 2, 2016; 8:00 p.m., ASN | | at Delaware | W 65–43 | 23–5 (16–1) | Bob Carpenter Center (1,659); Newark, DE |
| March 5, 2016; 12:00 p.m. | | at College of Charleston | W 76–46 | 24–5 (17–1) | TD Arena (91); Charleston, SC |
CAA women's tournament
| March 10, 2016; 12:00 p.m., ASN | | vs. College of Charleston; Quarterfinals | W 53–50 | 25–5 | Show Place Arena; Upper Marlboro, MD |
| March 11, 2016; 1:00 p.m., CSN | | vs. Delaware; Semifinals | W 68–47 | 26–5 | Show Place Arena; Upper Marlboro, MD |
| March 12, 2016; 4:00 p.m., CSN | | vs. Drexel; Championship | W 60–46 | 27–5 | Show Place Arena (1,207); Upper Marlboro, MD |
NCAA women's tournament
| March 18, 2016*; 12:00 p.m., ESPN2 | (11 D) | vs. (6 D) No. 20 DePaul; First round | L 67–97 | 27–6 | KFC Yum! Center; Louisville, KY |
*Non-conference game. ^{#}Rankings from AP poll. (#) Tournament seedings in parentheses. D=Dallas Region. All times are in Eastern.

== Rankings ==
Regular-season polls
| Poll | Pre- season | Week 2 | Week 3 | Week 4 | Week 5 | Week 6 | Week 7 | Week 8 | Week 9 | Week 10 | Week 11 | Week 12 | Week 13 | Week 14 | Week 15 | Week 16 | Week 17 | Week 18 | Week 19 | Final |
|---|---|---|---|---|---|---|---|---|---|---|---|---|---|---|---|---|---|---|---|---|
| AP | NR | NR | NR | NR | NR | NR | NR | NR | NR | NR | NR | NR | NR | NR | NR | NR | RV | RV | RV | N/A |
| Coaches | RV | RV | NR | NR | NR | NR | NR | NR | NR | NR | NR | NR | NR | NR | NR | NR | RV | RV | RV | NR |

Legend
| | Increase in ranking |
| | Decrease in ranking |
| | No change |
| (RV) | Received votes |

== See also ==
- 2015–16 James Madison Dukes men's basketball team
