= 2015–16 Towson Tigers women's basketball team =

Intercollegiate basketball season

2015–16 Towson Tigers women's basketball
- Conference: Colonial Athletic Association
- Record: 7–24 (3–15 CAA)
- Head coach: Niki Reid Geckeler (3rd season)
- Associate head coach: Erin Dickerson
- Assistant coaches: Christie Rogers; Erica Williamson
- Home arena: SECU Arena

2015–16 CAA women's basketball standings
	Conf.				Overall
Team	W		L	PCT	W		L	PCT
James Madison †	17	–	1	.944	27	–	6	.818
Hofstra	13	–	5	.722	25	–	9	.735
Drexel	13	–	5	.722	19	–	14	.576
Elon	11	–	7	.611	18	–	13	.581
Delaware	10	–	8	.556	16	–	15	.516
Northeastern	9	–	9	.500	15	–	16	.484
William & Mary	6	–	12	.333	15	–	15	.500
College of Charleston	5	–	13	.278	11	–	20	.355
UNC Wilmington	3	–	15	.167	7	–	23	.233
Towson	3	–	15	.167	7	–	24	.226
† 2016 CAA tournament winner As of March 28, 2016; Rankings from AP poll

The 2015–16 Towson Tigers women's basketball team represented Towson University during the 2015–16 NCAA Division I women's basketball season. The Tigers, led by third-year head coach Niki Reid Geckeler, played their home games at SECU Arena and were members of the Colonial Athletic Association (CAA). They finished the season 7–24, 3–15 in CAA play, to finish in a tie for ninth place. They advanced to the quarterfinals of the CAA women's tournament where they lost to Drexel.

== Roster ==
2015–16 Towson Tigers women's basketball team
Players
Coaches

Pos.	#	Name	Height	Year	Previous school	Hometown
G	0	Breonn Hughey	5 ft 5 in (1.65 m)	So	Capital Christian Academy	Washington, D.C.
G	1	Dominique Johnson	5 ft 6 in (1.68 m)	Sr	Riverdale Baptist HS	Laurel, MD
G	3	Sianni Martin	5 ft 8 in (1.73 m)	Fr	Neumann Gorretti HS	Philadelphia, PA
G	4	Braysia Hicks	5 ft 10 in (1.78 m)	So	Hampton Roads Academy	Yorktown, VA
F	5	Jordyn Smith	6 ft 0 in (1.83 m)	RS So	Hillside HS	Durham, NC
G	10	Raine Bankston	5 ft 10 in (1.78 m)	RS So	John Glenn HS; Delaware State	Detroit, MI
G	11	Raven Bankston	5 ft 10 in (1.78 m)	Jr	John Glenn HS; Delaware State	Detroit, MI
G	12	Markeema Crawford	5 ft 8 in (1.73 m)	So	Edgewater HS	Orlando, FL
F	14	Brianna Bush	6 ft 2 in (1.88 m)	Jr	Elizabeth Seton HS	District Heights, MD
G	15	Brianna Taylor	5 ft 4 in (1.63 m)	RS Sr	Oakland Mills HS; Nyack College	Columbia, MD
G	21	A. J. Timbers	6 ft 0 in (1.83 m)	Fr	Neumann Gorretti HS	Philadelphia, PA
F	23	Brittany Tarr	6 ft 0 in (1.83 m)	Fr	Sevier County HS	Sevierville, TN
C	25	Maia Lee (I) (redshirt)	6 ft 4 in (1.93 m)	So	McLean; Old Dominion	McLean, VA
G	32	Shanea Butler	5 ft 10 in (1.78 m)	So	Westlake HS	Waldorf, MD
C	33	Daijha Thomas	6 ft 4 in (1.93 m)	So	Calvert HS	St. Leonard, MD

Head coach

Niki Reid Geckeler (Georgetown)

Assistant coach(es)

Erin Dickerson (Northwestern)
Christie Rogers (Washington College)
Erica Williamson (Notre Dame)

Legend

- (C) Team captain
- (S) Suspended
- (I) Ineligible
- (W) Walk-on
- Injured
- Current redshirt

Roster
Last update: July 21, 2024

== Schedule ==
Date time, TV	Rank^{#}	Opponent^{#}	Result	Record	Site (attendance) city, state
Non-conference regular season
November 14, 2015*; 2:00 p.m.		at Rider	L 72–78	0–1	Alumni Gymnasium (812); Lawrenceville, NJ
November 17, 2015*; 7:00 p.m.		at George Mason	L 66–78	0–2	EagleBank Arena (667); Fairfax, VA
November 22, 2015*; 4:00 p.m.		Coppin State	L 69–81	0–3	SECU Arena (801); Towson, MD
November 24, 2015*; 11:00 a.m.		UMBC	W 61–51	1–3	SECU Arena (2,333); Towson, MD
November 27, 2015*; 1:00 p.m.		vs. Western Illinois; UNF Thanksgiving Classic	W 83–77	2–3	UNF Arena; Jacksonville, FL
November 28, 2015*; 3:00 p.m., ESPN3		at North Florida; UNF Thanksgiving Classic	L 72–74 ^{OT}	2–4	UNF Arena (354); Jacksonville, FL
December 2, 2015*; 7:00 p.m.		at Cornell	L 60–88	2–5	Newman Arena (255); Ithaca, NY
December 6, 2015*; 8:00 p.m.		at Minnesota	L 86–105	2–6	Williams Arena (2,271); Minneapolis, MN
December 20, 2015*; 2:00 p.m.		Auburn	L 52–74	2–7	SECU Arena; Towson, MD
December 23, 2015*; 12:00 p.m.		at Georgetown	L 46–82	2–8	McDonough Gymnasium (413); Washington, D.C.
December 30, 2015*; 4:00 p.m.		UMKC	W 70–47	3–8	SECU Arena (382); Towson, MD
CAA regular season
January 3, 2016; 2:00 p.m.		at Northeastern	W 72–71	4–8 (1–0)	Cabot Center (403); Boston, MA
January 8, 2016; 7:00 p.m.		William & Mary	L 54–73	4–9 (1–1)	SECU Arena (485); Towson, MD
January 10, 2016; 1:00 p.m.		UNC Wilmington	L 49–52	4–10 (1–2)	SECU Arena (594); Towson, MD
January 15, 2016; 7:00 p.m.		Elon	W 85–78	5–10 (2–2)	SECU Arena (453); Towson, MD
January 17, 2016; 2:00 p.m.		at Delaware	L 64–69 ^{OT}	5–11 (2–3)	Bob Carpenter Center (1,975); Newark, DE
January 22, 2016; 7:00 p.m.		James Madison	L 57–64	5–12 (2–4)	SECU Arena (344); Towson, MD
January 24, 2016; 7:00 p.m.		at Hofstra	L 60–64	5–13 (2–5)	Hofstra Arena (145); Hempstead, NY
January 29, 2016; 7:00 p.m.		at UNC Wilmington	L 51–53	5–14 (2–6)	Trask Coliseum (413); Wilmington, NC
January 31, 2016; 2:00 p.m.		at College of Charleston	L 55–67	5–15 (2–7)	TD Arena (267); Charleston, SC
February 5, 2016; 7:00 p.m.		Delaware	L 62–66	5–16 (2–8)	SECU Arena (315); Towson, MD
February 7, 2016; 1:00 p.m.		Hofstra	L 56–74	5–17 (2–9)	SECU Arena (534); Towson, MD
February 12, 2016; 7:00 p.m.		at Elon	L 58–80	5–18 (2–10)	Alumni Gym (473); Elon, NC
February 14, 2016; 2:00 p.m.		College of Charleston	W 62–51	6–18 (3–10)	SECU Arena (482); Towson, MD
February 19, 2016; 7:00 p.m.		at Drexel	L 40–56	6–19 (3–11)	Daskalakis Athletic Center (908); Philadelphia, PA
February 21, 2016; 2:00 p.m.		at James Madison	L 45–61	6–20 (3–12)	JMU Convocation Center (2,612); Harrisonburg, VA
February 26, 2016; 7:00 p.m.		at William & Mary	L 65–78	6–21 (3–13)	Kaplan Arena (536); Williamsburg, VA
February 28, 2016; 2:00 p.m.		Northeastern	L 63–81	6–22 (3–14)	SECU Arena (525); Towson, MD
March 2, 2016; 7:00 p.m.		Drexel	L 33–74	6–23 (3–15)	SECU Arena (520); Towson, MD
CAA tournament
March 9, 2016; 2:30 p.m.		vs. William & Mary; First round	W 71–65	7–23	Show Place Arena (509); Upper Marlboro, MD
March 10, 2016; 5:00 p.m., ASN		vs. Drexel; Quarterfinals	L 54–71	7–24	Show Place Arena; Upper Marlboro, MD
*Non-conference game. ^{#}Rankings from AP poll. (#) Tournament seedings in parentheses. All times are in Eastern.

== See also ==
- 2015–16 Towson Tigers men's basketball team
