= 2015–16 Northeastern Huskies women's basketball team =

Intercollegiate basketball season

2015–16 Northeastern Huskies women's basketball
- Conference: Colonial Athletic Association
- Record: 15–16 (9–9 CAA)
- Head coach: Kelly Cole (2nd season)
- Assistant coaches: Ganiyat Adeduntan; Mike Leflar; Kindyll Dorsey
- Home arena: Cabot Center; Matthews Arena

2015–16 CAA women's basketball standings
	Conf.				Overall
Team	W		L	PCT	W		L	PCT
James Madison †	17	–	1	.944	27	–	6	.818
Hofstra	13	–	5	.722	25	–	9	.735
Drexel	13	–	5	.722	19	–	14	.576
Elon	11	–	7	.611	18	–	13	.581
Delaware	10	–	8	.556	16	–	15	.516
Northeastern	9	–	9	.500	15	–	16	.484
William & Mary	6	–	12	.333	15	–	15	.500
College of Charleston	5	–	13	.278	11	–	20	.355
UNC Wilmington	3	–	15	.167	7	–	23	.233
Towson	3	–	15	.167	7	–	24	.226
† 2016 CAA tournament winner As of March 28, 2016; Rankings from AP poll

The 2015–16 Northeastern Huskies women's basketball team represented the Northeastern University during the 2015–16 NCAA Division I women's basketball season. The Huskies, led by second year head coach Kelly Cole, played their home games at the Cabot Center with one game at Matthews Arena. They were members of the Colonial Athletic Association. They finished the season 15–16, 9–9 CAA play to finish in sixth place. They advanced to the semifinals of the CAA women's tournament, where they lost to Towson.

== Roster ==
2015–16 Northeastern Huskies women's basketball team
Players
Coaches

Pos.	#	Name	Height	Year	Previous school	Hometown
G	1	Zoe Zwerling	5 ft 8 in (1.73 m)	Fr	Henry M. Gunn	Palo Alto, California
G	3	Loren Lassiter	5 ft 11 in (1.8 m)	So	Bishop O'Dowd HS	Castro Valley, California
G	4	Claudia Oritz	5 ft 7 in (1.7 m)	RS So	San Jorge Academy; Ole Miss	Carolina, PR
G	20	Jess Genco	5 ft 5 in (1.65 m)	Fr	Scranton Prep	Scranton, Pennsylvania
G	22	Te'Erica Eason	5 ft 8 in (1.73 m)	Fr	The Lovett School	Atlanta
G/F	23	Samantha DeFreese	5 ft 10 in (1.78 m)	Sr	Berkshire School	Bergenfield, New Jersey
F	24	Gabriella Giacone	6 ft 0 in (1.83 m)	Fr	Bethlehem Central	Delmar, New York
C	30	Briana Schnare	6 ft 3 in (1.91 m)	Sr	Wachusetts Regional HS; Manhattan	Holden, Massachusetts
F	32	Maureen Taggart	5 ft 11 in (1.8 m)	So	Tilton School	Wallingford, Vermont
C	33	Francesca Salley	6 ft 2 in (1.88 m)	Jr	East HS	Denver, Colorado

Head coach

- Kelly Cole (Northwestern)

Assistant coach(es)

- Ganiyat Adeduntan (Florida State)
- Mike Leflar (Boston College)
- Kindyll Dorsey (Boston College)

Legend

- (C) Team captain
- (S) Suspended
- (I) Ineligible
- (W) Walk-on
- Injured
- Current redshirt

Roster

== Schedule ==
Date time, TV	Rank^{#}	Opponent^{#}	Result	Record	Site (attendance) city, state
Non-conference regular season
11/13/2015*; 12:00 pm		at Boston University	W 77–44	1–0	Case Gym (1,464); Boston
11/15/2015*; 2:00 pm		at Siena	W 70–67	2–0	Alumni Recreation Center (1,064); Loudonville, New York
11/19/2015*; 7:00 pm		Maryland Eastern Shore	W 60–49	3–0	Cabot Center (287); Boston,
11/27/2015*; 3:00 pm		vs. Missouri; Saint Mary's Classic	L 56–69	3–1	McKeon Pavilion (175); Moraga, California
11/28/2015*; 3:00 pm		vs. Fresno State; Saint Mary's Classic	L 55–69	3–2	McKeon Pavilion (101); Moraga, California
12/02/2015*; 7:00 pm		at New Hampshire	W 66–54	4–2	Lundholm Gym (184); Durham, New Hampshire
12/04/2015*; 12:00 pm		Maine	W 56–44	5–2	Cabot Center (1,004); Boston
12/09/2015*; 7:00 pm		Quinnipiac	L 60–71	5–3	Cabot Center (732); Boston
12/18/2015*; 8:00 pm, ASN		No. 24 Michigan State; Northeastern Winter Showdown	L 52–77	5–4	Matthews Arena (1,869); Boston
12/21/2015*; 2:00 pm		Canisius	L 57–68	5–5	Cabot Center (248); Boston,
12/28/2015*; 2:00 pm		Boston College	L 45–71	5–6	Cabot Center (327); Boston
CAA regular season
01/03/2016; 2:00 pm		Towson	L 71–72	5–7 (0–1)	Cabot Center (403); Boston
01/07/2016; 7:00 pm		at Drexel	W 73–65	6–7 (1–1)	Daskalakis Athletic Center (570); Philadelphia
01/10/2016; 2:00 pm		at Delaware	L 52–59	6–8 (1–2)	Bob Carpenter Center (1,528); Newark, Delaware
01/15/2016; 7:00 pm		William & Mary	W 69–68 ^{OT}	7–8 (2–2)	Cabot Center (296); Boston
01/17/2016; 2:00 pm		at James Madison	L 62–85	7–9 (2–3)	JMU Convocation Center (2,227); Harrisonburg, Virginia
01/22/2016; 12:00 pm		at Hofstra	L 50–75	7–10 (2–4)	Hofstra Arena (1,875); Hempstead, New York
01/25/2016; 7:00 pm		Drexel	L 49–53	7–11 (2–5)	Cabot Center (319); Boston
01/29/2016; 7:00 pm		Elon	L 54–56	7–12 (2–6)	Cabot Center (344); Boston
01/31/2016; 2:00 pm		at William & Mary	L 62–69	7–13 (2–7)	Kaplan Arena (416); Williamsburg, Virginia
02/05/2016; 6:30 pm		at College of Charleston	W 52–49	8–13 (3–7)	TD Arena (112); Charleston, South Carolina
02/07/2016; 2:00 pm		James Madison	L 52–61	8–14 (3–8)	Cabot Center (312); Boston
02/12/2016; 7:00 pm		at UNC Wilmington	W 72–66	9–14 (4–8)	Trask Coliseum (374); Wilmington, Delaware
02/14/2016; 2:00 pm		at Elon	W 67–61	10–14 (5–8)	Alumni Gym (402); Hempstead, New York
02/19/2016; 7:00 pm		Delaware	W 57–54	11–14 (6–8)	Cabot Center (384); Boston
02/21/2016; 2:00 pm		UNC Wilmington	W 69–52	12–14 (7–8)	Cabot Center (326); Boston
02/26/2016; 7:00 pm		College of Charleston	W 78–66	13–14 (8–8)	Cabot Center (258); Boston
02/28/2016; 2:00 pm		at Towson	W 81–63	14–14 (9–8)	SECU Arena (525); Towson, Maryland
03/02/2016; 7:00 pm		Hofstra	L 64–71	14–15 (9–9)	Cabot Center (335); Boston
CAA Women's Tournament
03/10/2016; 7:30 pm, ASN		vs. Hofstra; Quarterfinals	W 65–54	15–15	Show Place Arena (1,147); Upper Marlboro, Maryland
03/11/2016; 3:30 pm, CSN		vs. Drexel; Semifinals	L 45–58	15–16	Show Place Arena (1,218); Upper Marlboro, Maryland
*Non-conference game. ^{#}Rankings from AP Poll. (#) Tournament seedings in parentheses. All times are in Eastern Time.

== See also ==
2015–16 Northeastern Huskies men's basketball team
