= 2015–16 Delaware Fightin' Blue Hens women's basketball team =

Intercollegiate basketball season

2015–16 Delaware Fightin' Blue Hens women's basketball
- Conference: Colonial Athletic Association
- Record: 16–15 (10–8 CAA)
- Head coach: Tina Martin (20th season)
- Assistant coaches: Jeanine Radice; Tom Lochner; Jade Singleton
- Home arena: Bob Carpenter Center

2015–16 CAA women's basketball standings
	Conf.				Overall
Team	W		L	PCT	W		L	PCT
James Madison †	17	–	1	.944	27	–	6	.818
Hofstra	13	–	5	.722	25	–	9	.735
Drexel	13	–	5	.722	19	–	14	.576
Elon	11	–	7	.611	18	–	13	.581
Delaware	10	–	8	.556	16	–	15	.516
Northeastern	9	–	9	.500	15	–	16	.484
William & Mary	6	–	12	.333	15	–	15	.500
College of Charleston	5	–	13	.278	11	–	20	.355
UNC Wilmington	3	–	15	.167	7	–	23	.233
Towson	3	–	15	.167	7	–	24	.226
† 2016 CAA tournament winner As of March 28, 2016; Rankings from AP poll

The 2015–16 Delaware Fightin' Blue Hens women's basketball team represented the University of Delaware during the 2015–16 NCAA Division I women's basketball season. The Fightin' Blue Hens, led by twentieth year head coach Tina Martin, played their home games at the Bob Carpenter Center and were members of the Colonial Athletic Association. They finished the season 15–17, 8–10 CAA play to finish in fifth place. They advanced to the semifinals of the CAA women's tournament, where they lost to James Madison.

== Roster ==
2015–16 Delaware Fightin' Blue Hens women's basketball team
Players
Coaches

Pos.	#	Name	Height	Year	Previous school	Hometown
G	1	Chastity Taylor	5 ft 9 in (1.75 m)	So	St. Anthony's HS	Islandia, New York
G	2	Courtni Green	5 ft 7 in (1.7 m)	Sr	Millbrook HS	Winchester, Virginia
G	3	Erika Brown	5 ft 7 in (1.7 m)	Jr	John F. Kennedy HS	Haledon, New Jersey
G	4	Jodi Salyer	5 ft 10 in (1.78 m)	Sr	Staunton River HS	Roanoke, Virginia
F	5	Makeda Nicholas	6 ft 1 in (1.85 m)	So	North Babylon HS	North Babylon, New York
F	12	Hannah Jardine (C)	6 ft 1 in (1.85 m)	Jr	O'Donel HS	St. John's, NL
F	13	Sadé Chatman	6 ft 1 in (1.85 m)	So	Central HS / Clemson	St. Paul, Minnesota
F	14	Alecia Bell (C)	6 ft 0 in (1.83 m)	Sr	Woodside HS	Newport News, Virginia
G	21	Kiersten West	5 ft 9 in (1.75 m)	So	Longwood HS	Coram, New York
G	23	Jade Clark	6 ft 0 in (1.83 m)	Sr	St. John's College HS	Ashburn, Virginia
G/F	32	Hannah Friend	5 ft 11 in (1.8 m)	Fr	Farmington HS	Farmington, Connecticut
F	33	Nicole Enabosi	6 ft 0 in (1.83 m)	Fr	Our Lady of Good Counsel HS	Gaithersburg, Maryland
F	40	Alexis Sears	6 ft 2 in (1.88 m)	So	Lenape HS	Mount Laurel, New Jersey
G		Alison Lewis (I)	5 ft 9 in (1.75 m)	So	Sanford School / Providence	Kennett Square, Pennsylvania

Head coach

- Tina Martin (Lock Haven)

Assistant coach(es)

- Jeanine Radice (Fordham)
- Tom Lochner (Temple)
- Jade Singleton (Duquesne)

Legend

- (C) Team captain
- (S) Suspended
- (I) Ineligible
- (W) Walk-on
- Injured
- Current redshirt

Roster
Last update: 28 February 2016

== Schedule ==
Date time, TV	Rank^{#}	Opponent^{#}	Result	Record	Site (attendance) city, state
Non-conference regular season
11/13/2015*; 7:00 pm		Lafayette	W 67–47	1–0	Bob Carpenter Center (1,382); Newark, Delaware
11/19/2015*; 7:00 pm		at Marist	W 56–50	2–0	McCann Field House (1,404); Poughkeepsie, New York
11/22/2015*; 2:00 pm		East Carolina	L 58–68	2–1	Bob Carpenter Center (1,450); Newark, Delaware
11/27/2015*; 7:00 pm		vs. Wisconsin; San Diego State Thanksgiving Classic	L 52–54	2–2	Viejas Arena (284); San Diego, California
11/29/2015*; 3:00 pm		vs. North Dakota State; San Diego State Thanksgiving Classic	W 62–50	3–2	Viejas Arena; San Diego
12/03/2015*; 7:00 pm		at Fordham	W 55–48	4–2	Rose Hill Gymnasium (540); Bronx, New York
12/07/2015*; 7:00 pm		at George Mason	L 83–90 ^{2OT}	4–3	EagleBank Arena (333); Fairfax, Virginia
12/10/2015*; 7:00 pm		at Georgetown	L 50–61	4–4	McDonough Gymnasium (541); Washington, D.C.
12/20/2015*; 2:00 pm		at Bucknell	L 51–80	4–5	Sojka Pavilion (496); Lewisburg, Pennsylvania
12/22/2015*; 6:00 pm		Vermont	W 71–60	5–5	Bob Carpenter Center (1,575); Newark, Delaware
12/29/2015*; 1:00 pm		at Robert Morris	L 50–53	5–6	Charles L. Sewall Center (607); Moon Township, Pennsylvania
CAA regular season
01/03/2016; 2:00 pm		at Hofstra	L 49–58	5–7 (0–1)	Hofstra Arena (215); Hempstead, New York
01/08/2016; 7:00 pm		UNC Wilmington	W 67–59	6–7 (1–1)	Bob Carpenter Center (1,541); Newark, Delaware
01/10/2016; 2:00 pm		Northeastern	W 59–52	7–7 (2–1)	Bob Carpenter Center (1,528); Newark, Delaware
01/15/2016; 6:30 pm		at College of Charleston	W 63–47	8–7 (3–1)	TD Arena (193); Charleston, South Carolina
01/17/2016; 2:00 pm		Towson	W 69–64 ^{OT}	9–7 (4–1)	Bob Carpenter Center (1,975); Newark, Delaware
01/22/2016; 7:00 pm		Drexel	L 53–54	9–8 (4–2)	Bob Carpenter Center (1,567); Newark, Delaware
01/26/2016; 7:00 pm		William & Mary	W 67–63	10–8 (5–2)	Bob Carpenter Center (1,481); Newark, Delaware
01/29/2016; 7:00 pm		at James Madison	L 55–75	10–9 (5–3)	JMU Convocation Center (2,681); Harrisonburg, Virginia
01/31/2016; 5:00 pm, ASN		at Drexel	L 43–47	10–10 (5–4)	Daskalakis Athletic Center (614); Philadelphia
02/05/2016; 7:00 pm		at Towson	W 66–62	11–10 (6–4)	SECU Arena (315); Towson, Maryland
02/07/2016; 2:00 pm		Elon	L 64–66 ^{OT}	11–11 (6–5)	Bob Carpenter Center (1,744); Newark, Delaware
02/12/2016; 7:00 pm		College of Charleston	W 72–55	12–11 (7–5)	Bob Carpenter Center (1,619); Newark, Delaware
02/14/2016; 2:00 pm		at William & Mary	W 69–53	13–11 (8–5)	Kaplan Arena (564); Williamsburg, Virginia
02/19/2016; 7:00 pm		at Northeastern	L 54–57	13–12 (8–6)	Cabot Center (384); Boston
02/21/2016; 2:00 pm		Hofstra	W 54–47	14–12 (9–6)	Bob Carpenter Center (1,929); Newark, Delaware
02/26/2016; 7:00 pm		at Elon	L 45–62	14–13 (9–7)	Alumni Gym (605); Elon, North Carolina
02/28/2016; 7:00 pm		at UNC Wilmington	W 56–44	15–13 (10–7)	Trask Coliseum (338); Wilmington, North Carolina
03/02/2016; 8:00 pm, ASN		James Madison	L 43–65	15–14 (10–8)	Bob Carpenter Center (1,659); Newark, Delaware
CAA Women's Tournament
03/10/2016; 2:30 pm, ASN		vs. Elon; Quarterfinals	W 57–50	16–14	Show Place Arena; Upper Marlboro, Maryland
03/11/2016; 1:00 pm, CSN		vs. James Madison; Semifinals	L 47–68	16–15	Show Place Arena; Upper Marlboro, Maryland
*Non-conference game. ^{#}Rankings from AP Poll. (#) Tournament seedings in parentheses. All times are in Eastern Time.

== See also ==
2015–16 Delaware Fightin' Blue Hens men's basketball team
