= Bernard "Bunny" Solomon =

Bernard "Bunny" Solomon (17 March 1923 – 19 October 2006) was an agent of change for sports at Northeastern University, an active Democratic appointed to multiple government positions, and an executive vice president of Bank of New England Corp.

== Early life ==
Solomon was born in Brookline, Massachusetts on March 17, 1923. The nickname "Bunny" came from when he came home from the hospital a relative commented that he looked like a little bunny. His parents were Samuel and Lillian Solomon and his brother was Jack Solomon He was a graduate of Brookline Public Schools and the former vice president of Young Democrats of Massachusetts. He was one of the Brookline's leading progressives. During World War II, he served for three and a half years with the 8th Armored Division. He attended Harvard University, Northeastern University, Shrivenham American University of England (part of the G.I. American Universities) and University of Illinois. He was a member of the Jewish War Veterans and a member of the Brookline Town Meeting since 1950. In 1957, he married Jolane Baumgartern of New York. Jolane was an instructor and researcher at Harvard School of Public Health. In 1987, he received an honorary degree of Doctor of Laws from the University of Massachusetts for his work as Chairman of the University's Building Authority.

== Career ==
Governor Foster Furcolo appointed Bernard to Commissioner and State Purchasing Agent in 1958 at age 34 after serving as his special assistant. He became the youngest state purchasing agent in the country and took over from Major George Cronin, who had served for 34 years. His previous business experience included working as the president of Samuel Solomon, Inc., a manufacturing firm in Boston, which he was responsible for purchasing $400,000 worth of equipment annually. As State Purchasing Agent, he saved the taxpayers hundreds of thousands of dollars annually by improving operating efficiency and taking advantage of purchasing rock salt at special provisions in transportation rates. In 1960 and 3 years left in his term remaining, he left his job as the purchasing agent to work at Stop & Shop Companies as the Vice President for Government and Community Affairs. He continued as a part-time member of the emergency finance board. Later, he was named executive vice president of Bank of New England Corp. after the Bank of New England Corp's merger with the Conifer Group, which Solomon's previous employer, Patriot Bank, had belonged to. At that time he was also vice chairman of Brookline Parks & Recreation Commission, on the board of trustees at Northeastern University, and a trustee of The Jewish Community Council of Metropolitan Boston. He served as a trustee and secretary/treasurer of the University of Massachusetts Building Authority, which led to an honorary degree. His retirement from the Bank of New England was in 1990.

== Northeastern University ==
Bunny was a member of the Class of 1946 at Northeastern and received an honorary Doctor of Public Service degree in 1991.

In December 1961, Bernard Solomon served as the Class Fund Chairman for the Northeastern University Class of 1946 for the Alumni Fund and raised a new all-time high of $105, 176. The following year, he was appointed as the vice chairman of the West of Boston Leadership Gifts committee in Northeastern University's $40,000,000 Diamond Anniversary Development, by the Northeastern president, Asa Knowles.

In January 1979, Northeastern University launched its Athletic Development Program to improve its sports program and respond to the needs of the eighties. Bernard served as the Chairman of the Athletic Development Committee. The campaign had a goal of $175,000 to improve facilities, provide equipment, grant scholarships, and recruit. Under Bunny's efforts, the campaign raised $490,000 for the program. Next, Bernard worked on renovating the Boston Arena, now named Matthews Arena, with a campaign that raised $600,000 for the project. The campaign for Northeastern's outdoor track and field facility in Dedham, Massachusetts was next and on April 27, 1986, the track was dedicated to Bernard and Jolane Solomon because of their strong support to the Northeastern athletics program. The indoor track and basketball court at Cabot Center are named for Bunny's honor.

== Death ==
Solomon died at age 83 from complications of metastasized cancer at Brigham and Women's Hospital. He was survived by his three children and five grandchildren.
