= Northeastern Huskies swimming and diving =

Northeastern University women's swimming and diving team

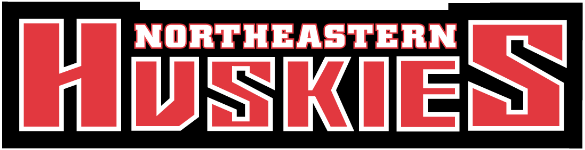
- Founded: 1978; 48 years ago
- Head coach: Roy Coates
- Conference: Colonial Athletic Association
- Location: Boston, Massachusetts, US
- Home pool: Barletta Natatorium
- Nickname: Huskies
- Colors: Red and black

Women's NCAA Champions
- 0

Women's Conference Champions
- 0 (AE 7: 1995, 1996, 2000, 2001, 2002, 2003, 2004)

The Northeastern University women's swimming and diving team debuted in the Fall of 1978 under the coaching staff of NU hall of fame member Janet Swanson. Since its inception, the Boston-based team has grown into one of the most respected and competitive Division I aquatics programs in New England. Northeastern was a member of the America East Conference from 1990 to 2005 and is currently a member of the Colonial Athletic Association.

== History ==
In 1993, former Dartmouth College Swimming head coach Roy Coates took over the Northeastern University program. Under Coates, the team built a solid foundation to set the tone for America East Conference dominance in the early 2000s. This included an undefeated 2001–02 season capped off by a final in season win over cross town rival Boston College. The team won the AE conference championship in 2000 and successfully defended the title 5 years in a row until the University of New Hampshire narrowly broke its streak.

During this time period NU was bolstered by a large group of versatile swimmers that eventually broke an unprecedented 13 of the 15 school swimming records between 2002 and 2005. These athletes included Katie Schmaling (50 Free, 100-200 Back), Sarah Reddick (100 Free, 100 Fly, 100-200 IM), Kelly McIsaac (200 Freestyle), Jesse Coxson (500 Freestyle), Emily White (200 Butterfly), Katie Kane (100 Breaststroke), Kristen Kane (200 Breaststroke), and Kerby Lewis (400 IM). All five relay records were re-established during the 2004 season as well.

Equally successful was the diving portion of the team coached by Brad Snodgrass. After following the lead of NU legends Katie Mailman and Jane deLima, Romania native Adela "Dea" Gavozdea dominated in her three-year tenure at NU qualifying for the NCAA championships 3 years in a row and was named the America East Most Outstanding Diver in the 2003–04 season.
