= 2016 CAA women's basketball tournament =

- Classification: Division I
- Season: 2015–16
- Teams: 10
- Site: Show Place Arena; Upper Marlboro, Maryland
- Champions: James Madison (9th title)
- Winning coach: Kenny Brooks (5th title)
- MVP: Jazmon Gwathmey (James Madison)
- Attendance: 7,609
- Television: CSN, ASN, CAA.tv
- CAA women's basketball tournaments

2015–16 CAA women's basketball standings
	Conf.				Overall
Team	W		L	PCT	W		L	PCT
James Madison †	17	–	1	.944	27	–	6	.818
Hofstra	13	–	5	.722	25	–	9	.735
Drexel	13	–	5	.722	19	–	14	.576
Elon	11	–	7	.611	18	–	13	.581
Delaware	10	–	8	.556	16	–	15	.516
Northeastern	9	–	9	.500	15	–	16	.484
William & Mary	6	–	12	.333	15	–	15	.500
College of Charleston	5	–	13	.278	11	–	20	.355
UNC Wilmington	3	–	15	.167	7	–	23	.233
Towson	3	–	15	.167	7	–	24	.226
† 2016 CAA tournament winner As of March 28, 2016; Rankings from AP poll

The 2016 Colonial Athletic Association women's basketball tournament was held March 9–12, 2016 at the Show Place Arena in Upper Marlboro, Maryland.

== Seeds ==
Seed	School	Conference	Overall	Tiebreaker 1	Tiebreaker 2
1	James Madison ‡†	17–1	24–5		
2	Drexel †	13–5	17–12	1–1 vs Elon	
3	Hofstra †	13–5	22–7	0–2 vs Elon	
4	Elon †	11–7	18–11		
5	Delaware †	10–8	15–14	1–1 vs Elon	
6	Northeastern †	10–8	15–14	0–2 vs Elon	
7	William & Mary	6–12	15–14		
8	College of Charleston	5–13	10–19		
9	UNC Wilmington	3–15	7–22	2–0 vs Towson	
10	Towson	3–15	6–23	0–2 vs UNCW	
‡ – CAA regular season champions. † – Received a bye in the conference tournament. Overall records are as of the end of the regular season.

== Schedule ==
Session	Game	Time*	Matchup^{#}	Television	Attendance
First round – Wednesday, March 9, 2016
1	1	12:00 pm	#9 UNC Wilmington 62 vs. #8 College of Charleston 71	CAA.tv	509
1	2	2:30 pm	#10 Towson 71 vs. #7 William & Mary 65	CAA.tv	509
Quarterfinals – Thursday, March 10, 2016
2	3	12:00 pm	#8 College of Charleston 50 vs. #1 James Madison 53	ASN	1,147
2	4	2:30 pm	#5 Delaware 57 vs #4 Elon 50	ASN	1,147
3	5	5:00 pm	#10 Towson 54 vs. #2 Drexel 71	ASN	1,147
3	6	7:30 pm	#6 Northeastern 65 vs #3 Hofstra 54	ASN	1,147
Semifinals – Friday, March 11, 2016
4	7	1:30 pm	#5 Delaware 47 vs. #1 James Madison 68	CSN	1,216
4	8	4:00 pm	#6 Northeastern 45 vs. #2 Drexel 58	CSN	1,216
Championship – Saturday, March 12, 2016
5	9	4:00 pm	#2 Drexel 46 vs #1 James Madison 60	CSN	1,207
*Game times in ET.

== Bracket ==
First round Wednesday, March 9 CAA.tv
8	College of Charleston	71
9	UNC Wilmington	62
7	William & Mary	65
10	Towson	71

Quarterfinals; Thursday, March 10; ASN
1	James Madison	53
8	College of Charleston	50
4	Elon	50
5	Delaware	57
2	Drexel	71
10	Towson	54
6	Northeastern	65
3	Hofstra	54

Semifinals; Friday, March 11; CSN
1	James Madison	68
5	Delaware	47
2	Drexel	58
6	Northeastern	45

Final; Saturday, March 12; CSN
1	James Madison	60
2	Drexel	46

== See also ==
- 2016 CAA men's basketball tournament
