= Cabot Center =

Indoor arena in Boston, Massachusetts

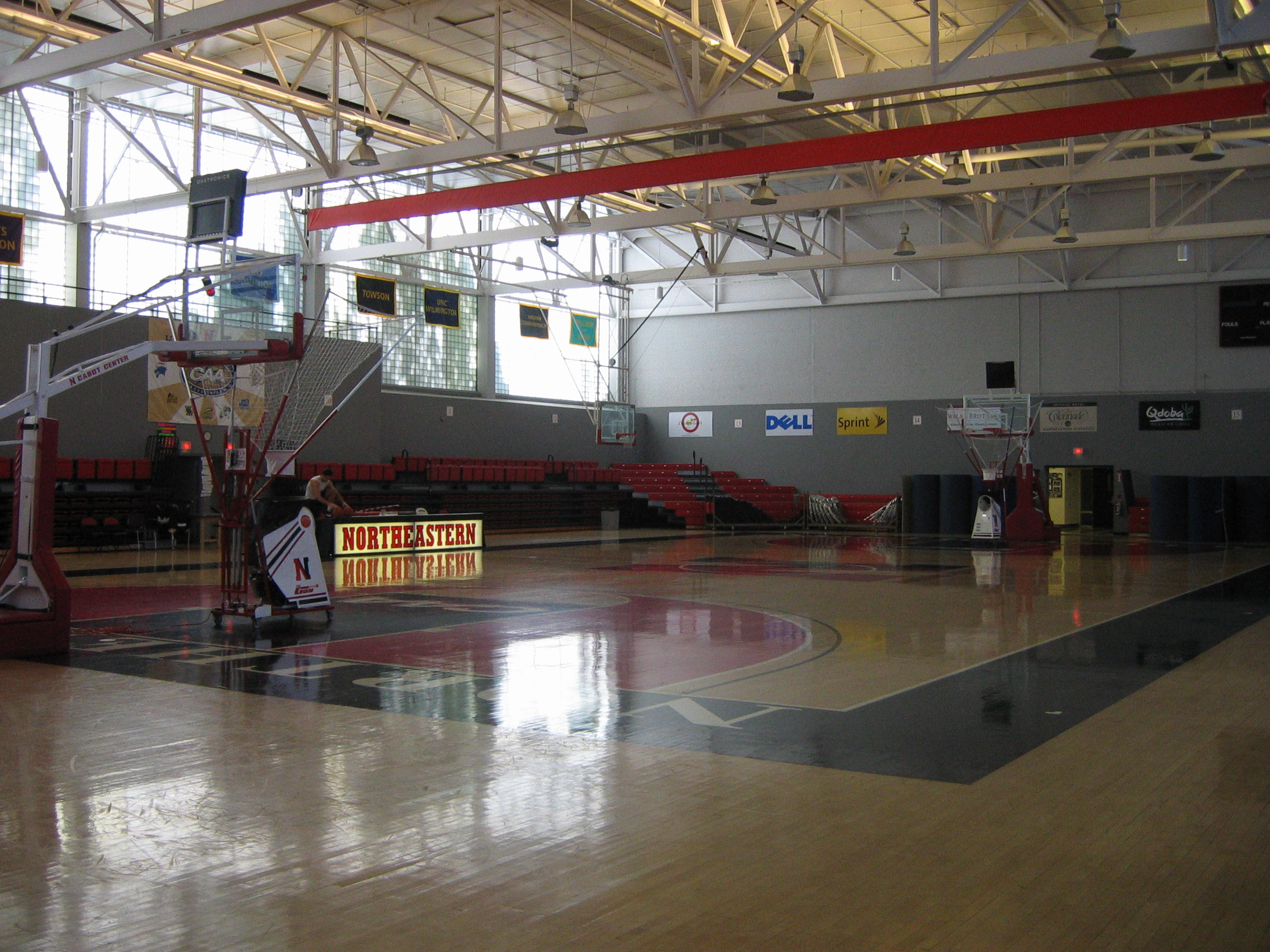
- Inside of the Cabot Center, circa 2008
- Interactive map of Cabot Center
- Location: 400 Huntington Ave, Boston, MA 02115
- Coordinates: 42.3396°N 71.0898°W
- Surface: Hardwood

Tenant
- Northeastern Huskies

The Cabot Center is the home of several indoor athletic teams of Northeastern University Huskies in Boston, Massachusetts. Built in 1954 and named in 1957 for patron Godfrey Lowell Cabot, the building houses a variety of facilities for the various teams.

The arena is built on the site of the old Huntington Avenue Grounds, where the first-ever World Series baseball game was held in 1903, and is barely over a quarter-mile (402 m) away to the southwest from the Matthews Arena, the original home of the NHL's Boston Bruins ice hockey team in 1924.

== Solomon Court ==
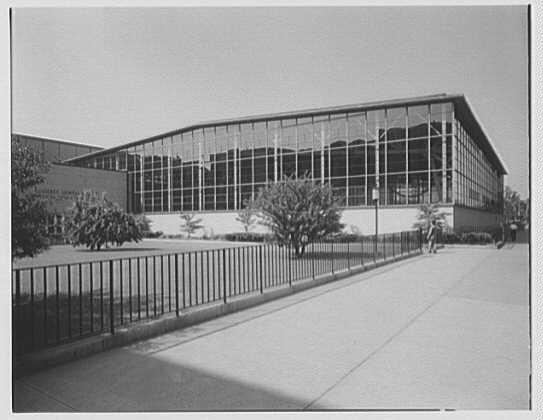
Cabot in 1952

Solomon Court at Cabot Center is the 1800-seat home to the men's and women's basketball and volleyball teams. Men's basketball, which had previously used Cabot Center as its non-game day home, moved full-time into the facility after the late-2025 closure and subsequent demolition of Matthews Arena. In the late 1990s, the facilities underwent a multimillion-dollar renovation culminating with the dedication of the court to long-time fan Bernard "Bunny" Solomon on November 28, 2000.

The venue hosted the championship game of the ECAC North, now America East Conference men's basketball tournament in 1981.

== Solomon Indoor Track ==
When the Cabot Center opened in 1954 the building included a dirt floor track & field facility, not uncommon at the time. Now known as the Solomon Indoor Track, the facilities have undergone a number of renovations, including the installation of a 120-yard banked track in 1971, followed by the installation of a flat rubber surface track. In 2008 the facilities were revamped once again, installing an embedded granule track featuring four-lane straightaways, two-lane ovals, and a pole vault pit. Additionally, a turf infield has been included to allow training by many of the University's sports teams. This track is also named for Bernard "Bunny" Solomon as well as his wife, Jolane.

== Barletta Natatorium ==
The Barletta Natatorium features a 6 lane 25-yard indoor swimming pool that is home to the Northeastern Swimming & Diving team. Dedicated on January 14, 1969, the pool facility is named in memory of members of the Barletta family and seats over 500 fans.

== Other facilities ==
The facility also offers racquetball courts, a swim center, workout facilities and other modern athletic amenities.

== See also ==
- List of NCAA Division I basketball arenas
