= Amy D. Ronner =

American legal scholar and author

- Title: Professor of Law Emerita

Academic background
- Education: Beloit College; University of Michigan; University of Miami

Academic work
- Discipline: Law
- Sub-discipline: Therapeutic jurisprudence, law and literature
- Institutions: St. Thomas University School of Law
- Notable works: Dostoevsky and the Law (2015)
- Notable ideas: The "three Vs" (voice, validation, and voluntary participation)

Amy D. Ronner is an American legal scholar and author. She is a professor of law emerita at St. Thomas University School of Law in Miami, where she taught from 1992 and founded the school's in-house appellate litigation clinic. Her academic work covers therapeutic jurisprudence, law and literature, constitutional and civil-rights law, and the legal, sociological, and psychological dimensions of the writings of Fyodor Dostoevsky.

Ronner holds a doctorate in English literature as well as a law degree, and much of her scholarship combines the two fields. In therapeutic jurisprudence she articulated a framework of "voice, validation, and voluntary participation", sometimes called the "three Vs", which later authors have discussed and applied. She has written six academic books, including three studies published between 2010 and 2020 that were reviewed in law and Slavic-studies journals.

== Education and early legal career ==
Ronner earned a Bachelor of Arts from Beloit College in Wisconsin in 1975 and a master's degree and a doctorate in English language and literature from the University of Michigan, completing her PhD in 1980 with a specialization in nineteenth-century British literature. Before entering law she taught literature and composition as a teaching fellow at Michigan and as a lecturer at the University of Miami. She then studied law at the University of Miami School of Law, receiving her Juris Doctor magna cum laude in 1985.

After law school Ronner was a law clerk to Judge Eugene P. Spellman of the United States District Court for the Southern District of Florida, and later practiced appellate litigation at the law firm Holland & Knight. She became a board-certified appellate lawyer in 1995 and was elected a fellow of the American Bar Foundation in 1998. She was installed as president of the South Florida chapter of the Federal Bar Association in 2005.

== Academic career ==
Ronner joined the law faculty of St. Thomas University School of Law in 1992, where she taught courses including constitutional law, criminal procedure, wills and trusts, and sexual identity and the law. She created and directed the school's in-house appellate litigation clinic, in which law students represented clients before the Florida appellate courts. The clinic's work was recorded in a 2000 Supreme Court of Florida judicial-conduct decision that described Ronner supervising students at an oral argument. She was a visiting professor at the University of Miami School of Law in 2002 and 2003, and is a professor of law emerita. St. Thomas University School of Law later named a therapeutic-jurisprudence award for graduate students after Ronner and Michael P. Pacin. In 2025 she was appointed to the board of trustees of the Aspen Music Festival and School.

== Scholarship ==
=== Therapeutic jurisprudence ===
Ronner's work in therapeutic jurisprudence developed from her appellate practice and teaching. In a 2002 article in the University of Cincinnati Law Review she set out a framework for evaluating how people experience the legal process, organized around voice, validation, and voluntary participation. The formulation, which she developed in part through work with the legal scholar Bruce J. Winick, became known as the "three Vs". Writing in the University of Miami Law Review, David C. Yamada described Ronner as having developed a framework for gauging parties' experiences with the legal system, and set out its three components. The framework has since been discussed in later therapeutic-jurisprudence scholarship.

=== Constitutional and civil-rights law ===
Ronner has written on the Fourth Amendment, gender, and sexual orientation and the law. Her 2001 article "Fleeing While Black: The Fourth Amendment Apartheid", published in the Columbia Human Rights Law Review, argues that members of minority groups and residents of high-crime areas may flee from the police for reasons unrelated to guilt. The article was cited by the United States Court of Appeals for the First Circuit in United States v. Wright (2009) and in the Harvard Law Review. Her 2005 book Homophobia and the Law, published by the American Psychological Association, was placed by the legal scholar Casey Charles within an emerging critical queer studies approach to law, alongside earlier work by William Eskridge and Ruthann Robson.

=== Law, literature, and Dostoevsky studies ===
Several of Ronner's books apply literary analysis to legal questions. Law, Literature, and Therapeutic Jurisprudence (2010) reads authors such as Herman Melville, Arthur Miller and Dostoevsky through a therapeutic-jurisprudence lens; it was reviewed in the Law and Politics Book Review and The Florida Bar Journal. Her 2015 study Dostoevsky and the Law examines Dostoevsky's fiction in relation to doctrines of testamentary capacity, confession, and imprisonment. Reviewing it in Slavic Review, Cristina Vatulescu called the book extensively researched and a useful teaching resource that presents earlier English-language scholarship fairly. The book was also reviewed by Gene Fitzgerald in the Slavic and East European Journal and by Anna Schur in The Russian Review. Writing in the Los Angeles Review of Books, the Slavist Ilya Vinitsky cited Dostoevsky and the Law as an example of American readings of Dostoevsky's prison writing. Ronner's Dostoevsky as Suicidologist (2020), which relates suicide in Dostoevsky's fiction to sociological and psychological theory, was reviewed in Slavic Review by John Givens and in The Russian Review.

== Selected works ==
- W. H. Hudson: The Man, The Novelist, The Naturalist. AMS Press. 1986.
- Practical Guide to the Appellate Courts of Florida (with Arthur J. England Jr.). Revere Legal Publishers. 1st ed. 1997.
- Homophobia and the Law. American Psychological Association. 2005.
- Law, Literature, and Therapeutic Jurisprudence. Carolina Academic Press. 2010.
- Dostoevsky and the Law. Carolina Academic Press. 2015.
- Dostoevsky as Suicidologist: Self-Destruction and the Creative Process. Lexington Books. 2020.
- "Fleeing While Black: The Fourth Amendment Apartheid". Columbia Human Rights Law Review. 32: 383–430. 2001.
- "Songs of Validation, Voice, and Voluntary Participation: Therapeutic Jurisprudence, Miranda and Juveniles". University of Cincinnati Law Review. 71: 89–120. 2002.
