= 2016–17 Holy Cross Crusaders women's basketball team =

Intercollegiate basketball season

2016–17 Holy Cross Crusaders women's basketball
- Conference: Patriot League
- Record: 8–21 (6–12 Patriot)
- Head coach: Bill Gibbons (32nd season)
- Assistant coaches: Ann McInerney; Danielle Parks; Matt Raquet
- Home arena: Hart Center

2016–17 Patriot League women's basketball standings
	Conf.				Overall
Team	W		L	PCT	W		L	PCT
Bucknell †	16	–	2	.889	27	–	6	.818
Navy	14	–	4	.778	24	–	10	.706
Army	12	–	6	.667	22	–	9	.710
American	11	–	7	.611	15	–	16	.484
Boston University	11	–	7	.611	13	–	17	.433
Colgate	7	–	11	.389	10	–	20	.333
Loyola (MD)	6	–	12	.333	11	–	20	.355
Holy Cross	6	–	12	.333	8	–	21	.276
Lehigh	5	–	13	.278	10	–	20	.333
Lafayette	2	–	16	.111	4	–	28	.125
† 2017 Patriot League tournament winner As of March 4, 2017; Rankings from AP poll

The 2016–17 Holy Cross Crusaders women's basketball team represented the College of the Holy Cross during the 2016–17 NCAA Division I women's basketball season. The Crusaders, led by thirty-second year head coach Bill Gibbons, played their home games at the Hart Center and were members of the Patriot League. They finished the season 8–21, 6–12 in Patriot League play to finish in a tie for seventh place. They lost in the first round of the Patriot League women's tournament to Lafayette.

== Roster ==
2016–17 Holy Cross Crusaders women's basketball team
Players
Coaches

Pos.	#	Name	Height	Year	Previous school	Hometown
G	1	Tricia Byrne	5 ft 7 in (1.7 m)	Jr	Scranton Prep	Dunmore, PA
G	3	Infiniti Thomas-Waheed	5 ft 10 in (1.78 m)	Jr	Newton North	Newton, MA
G	5	Katie Doherty	5 ft 10 in (1.78 m)	Jr	Sachem East	Holbrook, NY
G	10	Megan Swords	6 ft 3 in (1.91 m)	Fr	Immaculate Heart Academy	Glen Rock NJ
G	11	Shannon Druck	5 ft 8 in (1.73 m)	Jr	Susquehannock	New Freedom, PA
G	12	Madalyn Smith	5 ft 8 in (1.73 m)	Fr	High Point Regional	Sussex, NJ
G/F	14	Kathryn Pedi	5 ft 9 in (1.75 m)	Fr	New Trier	Wilmette, IL
G/F	15	Madelyn Ganser	5 ft 11 in (1.8 m)	Sr	Needham	Needham, MA
G	21	Madison Springfield	5 ft 11 in (1.8 m)	Fr	Conant	Jaffrey, NH
G	22	Nicole Morris	5 ft 8 in (1.73 m)	Fr	Rumson-Fair Haven Regional	Rumson, NJ
F	23	Maggie Locke	6 ft 1 in (1.85 m)	So	Spring-Ford	Collegeville, PA
F	25	Lauren Manis	6 ft 1 in (1.85 m)	Fr	Bishop Feehan	Franklin, MA
F	41	Amy Hasenauer	6 ft 2 in (1.88 m)	Jr	Hilton	Greece, NY
C	55	Miranda Nixon	6 ft 3 in (1.91 m)	So	Trinity	Harrisburg, PA

Head coach

- Bill Gibbons (Clark)

Assistant coach(es)

- Ann McInerney (Assumption (MA))
- Danielle Parks (Adelphi)
- Matt Raquet (Pittsburgh)

Legend

- (C) Team captain
- (S) Suspended
- (I) Ineligible
- (W) Walk-on
- Injured
- Current redshirt

Roster

== Schedule ==
Date time, TV	Rank^{#}	Opponent^{#}	Result	Record	Site (attendance) city, state
Exhibition
11/06/2016*; 12:00 pm		Assumption	W 62–55		Hart Center; Worcester, MA
Non-conference regular season
11/11/2016*; 7:00 pm		at Manhattan	L 56–60	0–1	Draddy Gymnasium (431); Riverdale, NY
11/14/2016*; 6:00 pm		at Bryant	L 74–76	0–2	Chace Athletic Center (475); Smithfield, RI
11/16/2016*; 7:05 pm		Quinnipiac	L 55–78	0–3	Hart Center (475); Worcester, MA
11/19/2016*; 1:05 pm		Marist	W 50–46	1–3	Hart Center (792); Worcester, MA
11/23/2016*; 2:00 pm		at Dartmouth	L 49–53	1–4	Leede Arena (727); Hanover, NH
11/27/2016*; 5:05 pm		Yale	L 70–71 ^{OT}	1–5	Hart Center (642); Worcester, MA
11/30/2016*; 7:00 pm		at Vermont	L 52–63	1–6	Patrick Gym (459); Burlington, VT
12/07/2016*; 7:05 pm, WCTR		Penn State	L 48–84	1–7	Hart Center (877); Worcester, MA
12/10/2016*; 1:05 pm		UMass Lowell	W 62–47	2–7	Hart Center (921); Worcester, MA
12/18/2016*; 2:00 pm		at Massachusetts	L 66–69	2–8	Mullins Center (345); Amherst, MA
12/21/2016*; 7:00 pm		at No. 21 Arizona State	L 33–63	2–9	Wells Fargo Arena (1,659); Tempe, AZ
Patriot League regular season
12/30/2016; 1:05 pm		Boston University	L 49–66	2–10 (0–1)	Hart Center (1,147); Worcester, MA
01/02/2017; 1:00 pm		at Navy	L 56–57	2–11 (0–2)	Alumni Hall (434); Annapolis, MD
01/05/2017; 11:15 am		Colgate	L 54–62	2–12 (0–3)	Hart Center (2,379); Worcester, MA
01/08/2017; 2:00 pm		at Bucknell	L 48–77	2–13 (0–4)	Sojka Pavilion (451); Lewisburg, PA
01/11/2017; 2:00 pm		at Lafayette	W 67–61	3–13 (1–4)	Kirby Sports Center (347); Easton, PA
01/14/2017; 1:05 pm		Lehigh	W 65–47	4–13 (2–4)	Hart Center (963); Worcester, MA
01/18/2017; 7:05 pm		Army	L 59–67	4–14 (2–5)	Hart Center (911); Worcester, MA
01/22/2017; 1:00 pm		at American	W 61–60	5–14 (3–5)	Bender Arena (381); Washington, D.C.
01/28/2017; 1:05 pm		Navy	L 71–73	5–14 (3–6)	Hart Center (1,244); Worcester, MA
02/01/2017; 7:00 pm		at Colgate	L 52–70	5–15 (3–7)	Cotterell Court (649); Hamilton, NY
02/04/2017; 12:05 pm, ASN		Bucknell	W 63–51	6–15 (4–7)	Hart Center (1,012); Worcester, MA
02/08/2017; 7:05 pm		Lafayette	L 70–85	6–16 (4–8)	Hart Center (1,151); Worcester, MA
02/11/2017; 2:00 pm		at Lehigh	L 64–80	6–17 (4–9)	Stabler Arena (867); Bethlehem, PA
02/15/2017; 7:00 pm		at Army	L 41–60	6–18 (4–10)	Christl Arena (754); West Point, NY
02/18/2017; 1:05 pm		American	W 51–46	7–18 (5–10)	Hart Center (1,138); Worcester, MA
02/22/2017; 1:00 pm		at Loyola (MD)	W 59–58	8–18 (6–10)	Reitz Arena (426); Baltimore, MD
02/25/2017; 2:00 pm		at Boston University	L 56–68	8–19 (6–11)	Case Gym (415); Boston, MA
03/01/2017; 7:05 pm, WCTR		Loyola (MD)	L 37–56	8–20 (6–12)	Hart Center (992); Worcester, MA
Patriot League Women's Tournament
03/04/2017; 1:00 pm	(7)	(10) Lafayette; First Round	L 54–58	8–21	Hart Center (250); Worcester, MA
*Non-conference game. ^{#}Rankings from AP Poll. (#) Tournament seedings in parentheses. All times are in Eastern Time.

== See also ==
2016–17 Holy Cross Crusaders men's basketball team
