= David Wexler =

David Wexler may refer to:

- David B. Wexler, professor of law
- David Wexler (director) (born 1983), American film director, screenwriter and film producer
