= Stephanie Rhoades =

The Honorable Stephanie Rhoades served as a District Court Judge in Anchorage, Alaska, from 1992 to 2017. Judge Stephanie Rhoades founded the Anchorage Coordinated Resources Project (ACRP), better known as the Anchorage Mental Health Court (AMHC). AMHC was the first mental health court established in Alaska and the fourth mental health court established in the United States. Legal scholars suggest in the Alaska Law Review that mental health courts are to be considered therapeutic jurisprudence and define crime that deserves therapeutic justice as “a manifestation of illness of the offender’s body or character.” They follow that crime that falls under this definition “should be addressed through treatment by professionals.”

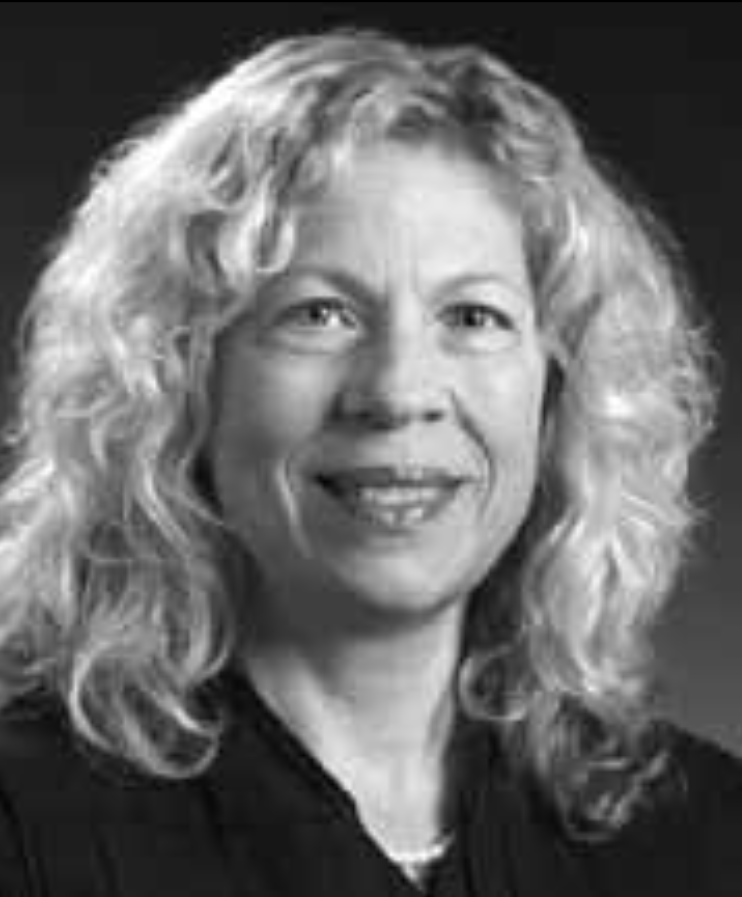
State of Alaska Official Election Pamphlet: Region II: Municipality of Anchorage, Matanuska-Susitna Borough. Division of Elections. p. 180

Rhoades saw how a jail sentence can be immensely detrimental to the quality of life of incarcerated individuals with mental illness. She noted that jail time often resulted in medication disruptions and placed these individuals at high risk for victimization. She also argued that extended stays in prison can increase suicidal tendencies in people with mental illness. Her vision was to decriminalize mental illness and reduce incarceration levels of those living with mental illness. Research shows that in 1998, 238,000 offenders serving time were living with mental illness. Judge Stephanie Rhoades founded AMHC armed with “a committee of court staff, attorneys, treatment providers, corrections personnel and other individuals." In order to alleviate the strain of the criminal justice system on people with mental illness, she incorporated (1) education or employment counseling; (2) benefit application assistance for the unemployable; (3) safe and supportive housing; (4) routine check ins for substance abuse; and (5) scheduled productive socially integrative activities.

== Early life and education ==
District Court Judge Stephanie Rhoades was born in Newton, Massachusetts, where she attended Needham High School. She graduated from the University of Massachusetts in Boston, Massachusetts, with a bachelor’s degree in Legal Services in 1983. In 1986, she then earned her J.D. from the Northeastern University School of Law in Boston, Massachusetts. At the start of her career, Rhoades served on the Alaska Supreme Court from 1986 to 1987. Following, she served as a law clerk to the District Attorney’s Office in Anchorage from 1988 to 1992. She would then serve as a District Court Judge from 1992 to 2017. Rhoades is the spouse to Russel Webb. She relocated from Massachusetts to Alaska in 1986; she has lived in Anchorage, Alaska, for thirty-four years.

== Anchorage Coordinated Resources Project ==
The Honorable Stephanie Rhoades founded the Anchorage Coordinated Resources Project (ACRP), otherwise known as the Anchorage Mental Health Court (AMHC) in 1998. AMHC was the first mental health court established in Alaska and the fourth mental health court established in the United States. The Court Coordinated Resources Project (CCRP) was officially established in April 1999, through an administrative order signed by the Honorable Elaine Andrews, the at time Circuit Court Presiding Judge. Andrews appointed Judges Stephanie Rhoades and John Lohff to build the foundation of CCRP, then AMHC. AMHC provides “therapeutic intervention” for individuals with mental illness who are likely to serve jail time where they may not be given the appropriate medical care. During her role in the AMHC, Rhoades also ensured that judges receive concentrated mental health training. Rhoades attests that "judges with personal and professional interests in improving criminal justice . . . have been key leaders in court development, expansion, and innovation." It is expected of the judges of the mental health courts to de-stigmatize mental illness in their courtroom. She calls for “a situation that is sympathetic and helpful and motivating and engaging for everyone.” The jurisdiction of AMHC is in Anchorage’s District Court, where state and municipal misdemeanor and felony offenses are heard. AMHC is a diversion program that works to shift the presence of individuals with mental illness from the criminal justice system to the mental health system. It serves as a diversion from the criminalization of individuals living with mental illness. In the early days of AMHC, only misdemeanor cases were heard. The Alaska Court System has allowed the AMHC to grow in that it now hears both misdemeanor and felony cases. The program's development to reach more participants in the mental health court includes the following criteria for eligibility, “a defendant must be: (1) [c]harged with a misdemeanor crime or class C felony, (2) [d]iagnosed with a mental illness, (3) [r]esiding in the Municipality of Anchorage, (4) [w]illing to voluntarily participate in an individualized case plan in lieu of traditional bail or sentencing conditions, (5) [e]ligible to receive community behavioral service.” During the first year of AMHC’s presence in Anchorage, roughly 129 people with mental illness were penalized with probation rather than a lengthy jail sentence.

=== Funding ===
Rhoades first set forth a proposal for a Bureau of Justice assistance grant, but the proposal was denied. Soon after, the Alaska Mental Health Trust Authority distributed funds to AMHC. These initial funds enabled the program to hire its first case coordinator and project manager, officiating AMHC. The Alaska Mental Health Trust Authority serves Alaskans who experience mental illness through financing programs that benefit mentally disabled individuals. The Trust supplies over $20 million in grants for relevant causes per year. Representatives of the Alaska Mental Health Trust Authority had close ties with Rhoades' CCRP subcommittee. Today, funding for AMHC comes from legislative financial aid, state and federal grants, and donations, both community-based and private. One cost break for AMHC includes selecting interns from the University of Alaska Anchorage.

== Retirement ==
Judge Stephanie Rhoades retired from the bench on Friday, September 1, 2017 after 25 years of serving as a state judge. Superior Court Judge Jennifer Henderson took over the mental health court operations in 2017.

== Other activities ==
=== Project Homeless Connect ===
Rhoades is an active volunteer for Anchorage’s Project Homeless Connect (PHC). PHC is a local event for homeless people in Anchorage. The event provides housing opportunities, amongst other services for the homeless community. Its goal is to create a collaborative of service providers, government agencies, and volunteers. Additionally, PHC collects data on the homelessness epidemic that is used to supply local, state, and federal databases. She is the Lead Food Coordinator for this Anchorage event.

=== Anchorage Assembly's Committee on Homelessness ===
Stephanie Rhoades and her husband Russ Webb are active members of the Anchorage Assembly's Committee on Homelessness. Russ formulated a 12-point plan for resolving Anchorage's homeless camps issue. Rhoades and Webb work on locating camps where they get campers involved. The pair focus on moving campers from the street to shelters. They also advocate for the prohibitions against naming camps public nuisances.
