= Ginger Lerner-Wren =

American judge (born 1959)

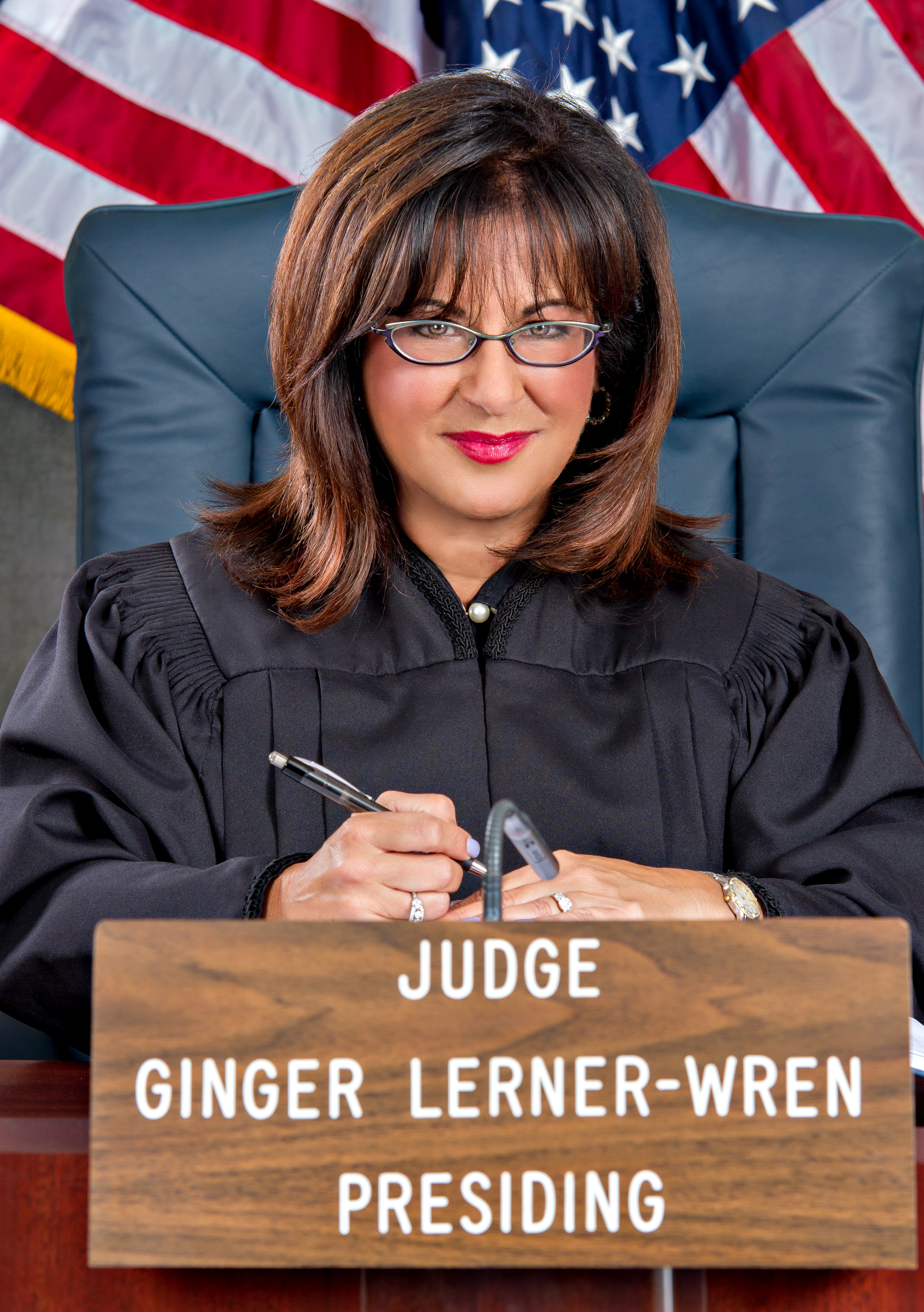

Judge, 17th Judicial Circuit of Florida, Broward County
- Incumbent
- Assumed office January 1997

Public Guardian of the 17th Judicial Circuit, Broward County
- In office 1993–1996
- Appointed by: Chief Judge Dale Ross

Personal details
- Born: Ginger Lerner-Wren; July 29, 1959 (age 66) Brooklyn, New York, U.S.
- Education: University of Miami (BA); Nova Southeastern University (JD)

Ginger Lerner-Wren (born 29 July 1959) is an American county judge and author. She is renowned for her advocacy in mental health law and criminal justice reform. Lerner-Wren also serves as an adjunct professor at Nova Southeastern University.

Appointed in 1997, Lerner-Wren became the first judge of the United States' inaugural Mental Health Court, established in Broward County, Florida. In 2002, she was appointed by former president George W. Bush to serve on the President's New Freedom Commission on Mental Health, also serving as chair of the Criminal Justice Sub-Committee. In 2018, Lerner-Wren released her book A Court of Refuge, Stories from the Bench of America’s First Mental Health Court, published by Beacon Press.

Since her appointment to the bench, Lerner-Wren has been recognized for her devotion to public service by the National Alliance on Mental Illness, the Hague Institute for Innovation of Law, and the National Council for Behavioral Health. In 2000, she was inducted into the Broward County Women's Hall of Fame.

== Early life and career ==
Born in 1959, in Brooklyn, New York, Lerner-Wren attended higher education in Florida, earning a Bachelor of Arts in politics and public affairs from the University of Miami in 1980 and a Juris Doctor from Nova Southeastern University College of Law in 1983.

Early in her career, Lerner-Wren demonstrated a strong commitment to serving vulnerable populations. She worked with the Florida Advocacy Center for Persons with Disabilities, where she was appointed to oversee the implementation of a consent decree as a monitor on behalf of plaintiffs in a class action affecting treatment conditions and the adequacy of community-based care for discharges at South Florida State Hospital.

Lerner-Wren's expertise in serving persons with disabilities was further recognized when she was appointed by Chief Circuit Judge Dale Ross to serve as the Public Guardian of the 17th Judicial Circuit of Florida. In this capacity, she was responsible for directing and administering all operations of the Broward County Office of Public Guardian, ensuring the health, safety, and welfare of disabled and indigent adults who were legally incapacitated and in need of legal guardianship and case management support.

Lerner-Wren was assigned to the Broward County Court Criminal Division in January 1997. Lerner-Wren's regular criminal court responsibilities include the administration of a full regular criminal misdemeanor division, including presiding over all dockets, pretrial motions, probationary matters and jury trials.

=== Mental Health Court ===
Within months of taking the bench, in what has been recognized as a historic administrative order in June 1997, Lerner-Wren was appointed by Chief Judge Dale Ross to administer and preside over the Nation's first mental health court. Lerner-Wren is responsible for leading and coordinating this specialized criminal, problem solving, diversionary court to address the complexities of mentally ill offenders arrested on nonviolent misdemeanor offenses and to improve the administration of justice for those with serious mental health and psychiatric disorders.

The Broward County Mental Health Court, dedicated to the safe diversion and treatment of the mentally ill, has been featured on Good Morning America, National Public Radio, and CNN, and covered by news media reports and articles nationally and internationally. The Broward County Mental Health Court was recommended as a preventative court strategy by Human Rights Watch, Special Report, "Ill Equipped", 2003.

Lerner-Wren and staff from the Broward County Mental Health Court have received numerous honors and recognition related to the innovation of the Court, the application of therapeutic jurisprudence, and for the humanitarian treatment of persons with severe mental illness.

The Broward County Mental Health Court, through its application of therapeutic jurisprudence, is recognized as best practice and showcased at The White House Conference on Mental Health in 1999. It was the model for the Federal Legislation passed by Congress in 2000 in comprehensive Mental Health Act to promote Mental Health Courts nationwide (Mentally Ill Offender Treatment and Crime Reduction Act of 2000). The Council of State Governments (Justice Center) is tasked with the implementation of this legislation, known as the Consensus Project.

=== Other tenures ===
Lerner-Wren was appointed by former president George W. Bush to serve on the President's New Freedom Commission on Mental Health in 2002. She served as chair of The Criminal Justice Sub-Committee.

Lerner-Wren speaks nationally and internationally on wide variety of topics, including problem-solving courts, cultural change leadership, mental health courts, therapeutic jurisprudence, and legal innovation. In addition, The Broward Mental Health Court has been honored for its pioneering innovation in human rights for persons with mental illness and related disorders in the criminal justice system. In December 2013, The HiiL Foundation (The Hague, Netherlands) selected Judge Ginger Lerner-Wren and Broward's Mental Health Court 'Top Finalist' - 2013 Innovating Justice Awards.

In March 2018, Lerner-Wren published a book titled A Court of Refuge that tells the story of how the court grew from an offshoot of her criminal division held during lunch hour without the aid of any federal funding, to a revolutionary institution that has successfully diverted more than 20,000 people with serious mental illness from jail and into treatment facilities and other community resources.

== Books ==
- A Court of Refuge (2018)

== Honors ==
- Member of the Florida Bar
- Member of the Broward County Bar Association
- Founding Member, International Therapeutic Jurisprudence Society
- Board of Governors, United Way of Broward County, Commission on Substance Use and Prevention
- Executive Committee, National Action Alliance for Suicide Prevention
- Broward Behavioral Health Coalition (Criminal Justice Advisory Board)
- Member of the Broward Behavioral Health Coalition (Criminal Justice Advisory Committee), 2012
- Member of the Broward County National Alliance on Mental Illness
- Former Board Director, Florida Initiative For Suicide Prevention
- Former Judges Advisory Board, University of Miami, School of Law, Therapeutic Jurisprudence Institute
- Honorary 'Bellringer", Mental Health Center of Broward, 2008
- National Advisory Council, Substance Abuses and Mental Health Services Administration (SAMHSA), 2003-2007
- Chair, The Criminal Justice Sub-Committee, President's New Freedom Commission on Mental Health, 2001–2003
- Broward County Women's Hall of Fame, 2000

=== Awards ===
- Award of Excellence in Advocacy for Official Public Service, National Council for Behavioral Health, 2015
- Top Recognition, Innovating Justice Awards 2013, The Hague Institute for the Internationalization of Law, The Netherlands
- Justice Leadership Award, Broward County Crime Commission, 34th Annual Awards Dinner, 2013
- Public Policy Award, Marion County Public Policy, 2004
- Distinguished Service Award, NAMI Florida, 2002
- Humanitarian Award, NSU Florida College of Psychology, 2001
- EPIC Award Mental Health Association of Broward, 2000
- Children's Advocate of the Year Award, Advocates for Children and Justice, 2000
- Most Innovative Court Project, Florida Circuit Court Conference Award, 1999
- Broward County NAMI, TIMES AWARD, 1997
- Giraffe Award, Women's Minority/Majority, 1991

== Publications ==
- Problem Solving Justice: Reducing Recidivism And Promoting Public Safety. Nova Law Review Online Journal, Winter 2014.
- Don't Miss the Chance to Impact Justice. Huffpost Healthy Living, 16 June 2013.
- Mental Health Courts. Annals of Health Law, Vol. 19, Issue 3, Spring 2010.
- Justice Speaks - Applying Therapeutic Jurisprudence (TJ) In A Court Of General Jurisdiction, Guest Column. The Arizona Journal of International and Comparative Law, May 2008
- Mental Health Courts. Contributor - Chapter:5: Slate, Risdon, Johnson, Wesley, "The Criminalization of Mental Illness: Crisis and Opportunity for the Justice System". Carolina Academic Press, 2008.
- Face to Face. A Conversation With Judge Ginger Lerner-Wren. Opinion and Editorial, Sun Sentinel, 2005
- Do Juveniles Facing Civil Commitment Have a Right to Counsel: A Therapeutic Jurisprudence Brief. Winick, B, Lerner-Wren, G., 17 U.Cinn L. Rev. 115-126 (2002).
- Bridging the Gap: America and Other Perspectives. Lerner-Wren, Dinerstein, Winick, Bliss, New York Law School Journal of International and Comparative Law, Vol. 21/ 3 (2002)
- A Court for the Nonviolent Defendant with a Mental Disability. Psychiatric Annals, "Lerner-Wren & Appel, Vol 31, No. 7, July 2001. published by SLACK, Inc. 6900 Grove Road, Thorofare, NJ 08086, 856-848-1000.
- The Broward Mental Health Court: A Preliminary Report. Court Review, The Journal of American Judges Association, Volume 37, Issue 4, Winter 2001. The National Center for State Courts.
- Contributing Editor CRI Publications, Community Mental Health Report.
- Study Site, National Center for Courts "Court Responses to Individuals in Need of Services", Promising Components of a Service coordination Strategy for Courts, 2001.
- Model Court Site: Monograph "Emerging Judicial Strategies for the Mentally Ill in the Criminal
- Caseload: Mental Health Courts", U.S. Department of Justice. (1999).
