= 2016–17 Colgate Raiders women's basketball team =

Intercollegiate basketball season

2016–17 Colgate Raiders women's basketball
- Conference: Patriot League
- Record: 10–20 (7–11 Patriot)
- Head coach: Bill Cleary (1st season)
- Assistant coaches: Mahogany Green; Kate Popovec; Candice Green
- Home arena: Cotterell Court

2016–17 Patriot League women's basketball standings
	Conf.				Overall
Team	W		L	PCT	W		L	PCT
Bucknell †	16	–	2	.889	27	–	6	.818
Navy	14	–	4	.778	24	–	10	.706
Army	12	–	6	.667	22	–	9	.710
American	11	–	7	.611	15	–	16	.484
Boston University	11	–	7	.611	13	–	17	.433
Colgate	7	–	11	.389	10	–	20	.333
Loyola (MD)	6	–	12	.333	11	–	20	.355
Holy Cross	6	–	12	.333	8	–	21	.276
Lehigh	5	–	13	.278	10	–	20	.333
Lafayette	2	–	16	.111	4	–	28	.125
† 2017 Patriot League tournament winner As of March 4, 2017; Rankings from AP poll

The 2016–17 Colgate Raiders women's basketball team represented Colgate University during the 2016–17 NCAA Division I women's basketball season. The Raiders, led by first year head coach Bill Cleary, played their home games at Cotterell Court and were members of the Patriot League. They finished the season 10–20, 7–11 in Patriot League play to finish in a tie for eighth place. They lost in the quarterfinals of the Patriot League women's tournament to Army.

== Roster ==
2016–17 Colgate Raiders women's basketball team
Players
Coaches

Pos.	#	Name	Height	Year	Previous school	Hometown
F	0	Mylah Chandler	5 ft 10 in (1.78 m)	So	Albany	Albany, NY
G	2	Tegan Graham	5 ft 11 in (1.8 m)	Fr	Wellington Girls' College	Wellington, New Zealand
G	4	Mackenzie Carroll	5 ft 9 in (1.75 m)	So	Central Bucks HS West	New Britain, PA
F	5	Chelsey Koren	5 ft 10 in (1.78 m)	So	Blairsville	Blairsville, PA
G	11	Kateri Stone	6 ft 1 in (1.85 m)	Jr	Montini Catholic	Naperville, IL
G	12	Ariel Etheridge	5 ft 8 in (1.73 m)	Jr	Tabor Academy	Smithfield, RI
G	13	Katie Curtis	5 ft 6 in (1.68 m)	Sr	Lebanon	Lebanon, IN
G	14	Rachel Thompson	5 ft 10 in (1.78 m)	Fr	Mary Institute and St. Louis Country Day	St. Louis, MO
G	15	Haley Greer	5 ft 10 in (1.78 m)	Fr	New Trier	Winnetka, IL
C	20	Steph Poland	6 ft 3 in (1.91 m)	RS Sr	Hathaway Brown	Valley View, OH
F	22	Abby Schubiger	6 ft 1 in (1.85 m)	Fr	Morristown	Morristown, NJ
F	23	Tori Pozsonyi	6 ft 1 in (1.85 m)	Jr	Roselle Catholic	Roselle Park, NJ
F	33	Julia Barcello	6 ft 0 in (1.83 m)	Jr	Seton Catholic Prep	Chandler, AZ
F	40	Summer King	6 ft 1 in (1.85 m)	So	Walpole	Walpole, MA

Head coach

- Bill Cleary (Villanova)

Assistant coach(es)

- Mahogany Green (Cleveland State)
- Kate Popovec (Northwestern)
- Candice Green (Colgate)

Legend

- (C) Team captain
- (S) Suspended
- (I) Ineligible
- (W) Walk-on
- Injured
- Current redshirt

Roster

== Schedule ==
Date time, TV	Rank^{#}	Opponent^{#}	Result	Record	Site (attendance) city, state
Non-conference regular season
11/11/2016*; 7:00 pm		at Providence	L 85–92 ^{2OT}	0–1	Alumni Hall (534); Providence, RI
11/13/2016*; 7:00 pm		at St. Bonaventure	L 57–70	0–2	Reilly Center (847); Olean, NY
11/16/2016*; 7:00 pm		Cornell	L 57–70	0–3	Cotterell Court (618); Hamilton, NY
11/20/2016*; 12:00 pm		at Brown	W 67–62	1–3	Pizzitola Sports Center (297); Providence, RI
11/22/2016*; 7:00 pm		at Siena	L 63–71	1–4	Alumni Recreation Center (423); Loudonville, NY
11/27/2016*; 2:00 pm		at Columbia	L 67–75	1–5	Levien Gymnasium (478); New York City, NY
12/04/2016*; 7:00 pm		at Purdue	L 51–71	1–6	Mackey Arena (5,610); West Lafayette, IN
12/08/2016*; 7:00 pm		Towson	W 76–71	2–6	Cotterell Court (472); Hamilton, NY
12/10/2016*; 4:00 pm		LIU Brooklyn	W 76–61	3–6	Cotterell Court (947); Hamilton, NY
12/18/2016*; 1:00 pm		at UMass Lowell	L 77–82 ^{OT}	3–7	Tsongas Center (353); Lowell, MA
12/22/2016*; 5:00 pm		at Gonzaga	L 42–72	3–8	McCarthey Athletic Center (5,719); Spokane, WA
Patriot League regular season
12/30/2016; 7:00 pm		Lafayette	W 76–69	4–8 (1–0)	Cotterell Court (441); Hamilton, NY
01/02/2017; 5:00 pm		at American	L 57–68	4–9 (1–1)	Bender Arena (321); Washington, D.C.
01/05/2017; 11:15 am		at Holy Cross	W 62–54	5–9 (2–1)	Hart Center (2,379); Worcester, MA
01/08/2017; 2:00 pm		Navy	L 67–80	5–10 (2–2)	Cotterell Court (593); Hamilton, NY
01/11/2017; 12:00 pm		Army	L 69–76	5–11 (2–3)	Cotterell Court (1,534); Hamilton, NY
01/14/2017; 2:00 pm		at Bucknell	L 56–79	5–12 (2–4)	Sojka Pavilion (695); Lewisburg, PA
01/18/2017; 7:00 pm		Boston University	W 96–87 ^{2OT}	6–12 (3–4)	Cotterell Court (573); Hamilton, NY
01/22/2017; 2:00 pm		at Loyola (MD)	L 77–87	6–13 (3–5)	Reitz Arena (1,750); Baltimore, MD
01/28/2017; 2:00 pm		American	L 62–73	6–14 (3–6)	Cotterell Court (738); Hamilton, NY
02/01/2017; 7:00 pm		Holy Cross	W 70–52	7–14 (4–6)	Cotterell Court (649); Hamilton, NY
02/04/2017; 4:00 pm		at Navy	W 69–61	8–14 (5–6)	Alumni Hall (723); Annapolis, MD
02/08/2017; 7:00 pm		at Army	L 47–57	8–15 (5–7)	Christl Arena (646); West Point, NY
02/11/2017; 2:00 pm		Bucknell	L 49–79	8–16 (5–8)	Cotterell Court (883); Hamilton, NY
02/15/2017; 7:00 pm		at Boston University	L 51–65	8–17 (5–9)	Case Gym (220); Boston, MA
02/18/2017; 2:00 pm		Loyola (MD)	W 76–62	9–17 (6–9)	Cotterell Court (718); Hamilton, NY
02/22/2017; 7:00 pm		Lehigh	W 75–70	10–17 (7–9)	Cotterell Court (823); Hamilton, NY
02/25/2017; 2:00 pm		at Lafayette	L 85–90	10–18 (7–10)	Kirby Sports Center (445); Easton, PA
03/01/2017; 7:00 pm		at Lehigh	L 74–83	10–19 (7–11)	Stabler Arena (551); Bethlehem, PA
Patriot League Women's Tournament
03/06/2017; 7:00 pm	(6)	at (3) Army; Quarterfinals	L 76–83	10–20	Christl Hall (190); West Point, NY
*Non-conference game. ^{#}Rankings from AP Poll. (#) Tournament seedings in parentheses. All times are in Eastern Time.

== See also ==
- 2016–17 Colgate Raiders men's basketball team
