= 2016–17 Loyola Greyhounds women's basketball team =

Intercollegiate basketball season

2016–17 Loyola Greyhounds women's basketball
- Conference: Patriot League
- Record: 11–20 (6–12 Patriot)
- Head coach: Joe Logan (11th season)
- Assistant coaches: Mary Wooley; Sarah Jones; Jenna Loschiavo
- Home arena: Reitz Arena

2016–17 Patriot League women's basketball standings
	Conf.				Overall
Team	W		L	PCT	W		L	PCT
Bucknell †	16	–	2	.889	27	–	6	.818
Navy	14	–	4	.778	24	–	10	.706
Army	12	–	6	.667	22	–	9	.710
American	11	–	7	.611	15	–	16	.484
Boston University	11	–	7	.611	13	–	17	.433
Colgate	7	–	11	.389	10	–	20	.333
Loyola (MD)	6	–	12	.333	11	–	20	.355
Holy Cross	6	–	12	.333	8	–	21	.276
Lehigh	5	–	13	.278	10	–	20	.333
Lafayette	2	–	16	.111	4	–	28	.125
† 2017 Patriot League tournament winner As of March 4, 2017; Rankings from AP poll

The 2016–17 Loyola Greyhounds women's basketball team represented Loyola University Maryland during the 2016–17 NCAA Division I women's basketball season. The Greyhounds, led by eleventh year head coach Joe Logan, played their home games at Reitz Arena and were members of the Patriot League. They finished the season 11–20, 6–12 in Patriot League play to finish in a tie for seventh place. They advanced to the quarterfinals of the Patriot League women's tournament where they lost to Bucknell.

== Roster ==
2016–17 Loyola Greyhounds women's basketball team
Players
Coaches

Pos.	#	Name	Height	Year	Previous school	Hometown
G	1	Molly Taylor	5 ft 9 in (1.75 m)	Fr	Mercersburg Academy	Cranleigh, England
G	3	Abby Omdahl	5 ft 11 in (1.8 m)	So	Saucon Valley	Bethlehem, PA
F	4	Claire Jakaitis	6 ft 2 in (1.88 m)	Fr	St. Charles North	South Elgin, IL
G	10	Stephanie Karcz	5 ft 11 in (1.8 m)	Fr	Middletown South	Red Bank, NJ
G	11	Bri Betz-White	5 ft 3 in (1.6 m)	Jr	Trinity	Mechanicsburg, PA
G	12	CaLee Gelbaugh	5 ft 8 in (1.73 m)	Jr	Central Dauphin East	Harrisburg, PA
G	14	Madelene McDonald	5 ft 10 in (1.78 m)	Jr	Southern Lehigh	Coopersburg, PA
F	15	Ashley Hunter	6 ft 0 in (1.83 m)	So	The John Carroll School	Abingdon, MD
F	21	Lauren Daugherty	6 ft 0 in (1.83 m)	Sr	Hanover Park	Florham Park, NJ
G	22	Alex Barazotti	5 ft 6 in (1.68 m)	So	Red Bank Catholic	Howell, NJ
G	23	Lisa Mirarchi	5 ft 8 in (1.73 m)	Sr	Villa Maria Academy	West Chester, PA
G/F	24	Maria Kilcullen	5 ft 9 in (1.75 m)	So	The Episcopal Academy	Berwyn, PA
F	31	Tori Schultz	5 ft 9 in (1.75 m)	So	Lampeter-Strasburg	Lancaster, PA
G	32	Hannah Niles	5 ft 9 in (1.75 m)	Fr	Walt Whitman	Glen Echo, MD
G/F	33	Carly Monzo	5 ft 10 in (1.78 m)	Jr	Mount St. Joseph Academy	Flourtown, PA
F	55	Courtney Vannoy	6 ft 1 in (1.85 m)	So	Blackhawk	Beaver Falls, PA

Head coach

- Joe Logan (Loyola (MD))

Assistant coach(es)

- Mary Wooley (USC Aiken)
- Sarah Jones (Villanova)
- Jenna Loschiavo (Saint Joseph's)

Legend

- (C) Team captain
- (S) Suspended
- (I) Ineligible
- (W) Walk-on
- Injured
- Current redshirt

Roster

== Schedule ==
Date time, TV	Rank^{#}	Opponent^{#}	Result	Record	Site (attendance) city, state
Non-conference regular season
11/11/2016*; 7:00 pm		Lipscomb	W 74–30	1–0	Reitz Arena (523); Baltimore, MD
11/13/2016*; 1:00 pm		at Cornell	L 50–58	1–1	Newman Arena (365); Ithaca, NY
11/15/2016*; 7:00 pm		at Fairfield	L 57–58 ^{OT}	1–2	Alumni Hall (287); Fairfield, CT
11/19/2016*; 2:00 pm		St. Francis Brooklyn	W 69–60	2–2	Reitz Arena (217); Baltimore, MD
11/21/2016*; 7:00 pm, ACCN Extra		at Pittsburgh	L 44–74	2–3	Petersen Events Center (651); Pittsburgh, PA
11/30/2016*; 7:00 pm		Columbia	L 53–65	2–4	Reitz Arena (137); Baltimore, MD
12/03/2016*; 1:00 pm		Mount St. Mary's	W 58–53	3–4	Reitz Arena; Baltimore, MD
12/07/2016*; 7:00 pm		Delaware	L 45–47	3–5	Reitz Arena (213); Baltimore, MD
12/10/2016*; 1:00 pm		at UMBC	W 70–65	4–5	Retriever Activities Center (380); Catonsville, MD
12/12/2016*; 7:00 pm		No. 4 Maryland	L 60–79	4–6	Reitz Arena (1,009); Baltimore, MD
12/23/2016*; 12:00 pm		at George Washington	L 64–74	4–7	Charles E. Smith Center (907); Washington, D.C.
Patriot League regular season
12/30/2016; 7:00 pm		American	L 45–60	4–8 (0–1)	Reitz Arena (256); Baltimore, MD
01/02/2017; 7:00 pm		at Lafayette	W 60–55	5–8 (1–1)	Kirby Sports Center (424); Easton, PA
01/05/2017; 7:00 pm		Lehigh	W 62–58	6–8 (2–1)	Reitz Arena (136); Baltimore, MD
01/08/2017; 2:00 pm		Army	W 71–62	7–8 (3–1)	Reitz Arena (187); Baltimore, MD
01/11/2017; 7:00 pm		at Navy	L 51–77	7–9 (3–2)	Alumni Hall (1,008); Annapolis, MD
01/14/2017; 2:00 pm		at Boston University	L 58–61	7–10 (3–3)	Case Gym (231); Boston, MA
01/18/2017; 7:00 pm		Bucknell	L 66–72	7–11 (3–4)	Reitz Arena (237); Baltimore, MD
01/22/2017; 2:00 pm		Colgate	W 87–77	8–11 (4–4)	Reitz Arena (234); Baltimore, MD
01/28/2017; 2:00 pm		Lafayette	W 75–47	9–11 (5–4)	Reitz Arena (1,750); Baltimore, MD
02/01/2017; 7:00 pm		at Lehigh	L 69–86	9–12 (5–5)	Stabler Arena (731); Bethlehem, PA
02/04/2017; 1:00 pm		at Army	L 48–67	9–13 (5–6)	Christl Arena (770); West Point, NY
02/08/2017; 7:00 pm		Navy	L 43–55	9–14 (5–7)	Reitz Arena (274); Baltimore, MD
02/11/2017; 4:00 pm		Boston University	L 55–67	9–15 (5–8)	Reitz Arena (282); Baltimore, MD
02/15/2017; 6:00 pm		at Bucknell	L 39–57	9–16 (5–9)	Sojka Pavilion (674); Lewisburg, PA
02/18/2017; 2:00 pm		at Colgate	L 62–76	9–17 (5–10)	Cotterell Court (718); Hamilton, NY
02/22/2017; 7:00 pm		Holy Cross	L 58–59	9–18 (5–11)	Reitz Arena (426); Baltimore, MD
02/25/2016; 2:00 pm		at American	L 59–66	9–19 (5–12)	Bender Arena (504); Washington, D.C.
03/01/2017; 7:00 pm		at Holy Cross	W 56–37	10–19 (6–12)	Hart Center (992); Worcester, MA
Patriot League Women's Tournament
03/04/2017; 7:00 pm	(8)	(9) Lehigh; First Round	W 78–50	11–19	Reitz Arena (247); Baltimore, MD
03/06/2017; 6:00 pm	(8)	at (1) Bucknell; Quarterfinals	L 72–75	11–20	Sojka Pavilion (546); Lewisburg, PA
*Non-conference game. ^{#}Rankings from AP Poll. (#) Tournament seedings in parentheses. All times are in Eastern Time.

== See also ==
- 2016–17 Loyola Greyhounds men's basketball team
