= Mental health court =

Specialized court for mental health issues

Mental health courts link offenders who would ordinarily be prison-bound to long-term community-based treatment. They rely on mental health assessments, individualized treatment plans, and ongoing judicial monitoring to address both the mental health needs of offenders and public safety concerns of communities. Like other problem-solving courts such as drug courts, domestic violence courts, and community courts, mental health courts seek to address the underlying problems that contribute to criminal behavior.

Mental health courts share characteristics with crisis intervention teams, jail diversion programs, specialized probation and parole caseloads, and a host of other collaborative initiatives intended to address the significant overrepresentation of people with mental illness in the criminal justice system.

== History ==
In the United States in the early 1980s, Judge Evan Dee Goodman helped establish a court exclusively to deal with mental health matters at Wishard Memorial Hospital. The mentally ill were frequently arrested and had charges pending when the treatment providers sought a civil commitment to send their patient for long-term psychiatric treatment. Goodman's court at Wishard Hospital could serve both purposes. The probate part of the mental health court would handle the civil commitment. The criminal docket of the mental health court could handled the arrest charges. The criminal charges could be put on diversion, or hold, allowing the patient's release from jail custody. The civil commitment would then become effective and the patient could be sent to a state hospital for treatment. Goodman would schedule periodic hearings to learn of the patient's progress. If warranted, the criminal charges were dismissed, but the patient still had obligations to the civil commitment.

In addition to arranging inpatient treatment, Goodman often put defendants on diversion, or on an outpatient commitment, and ordered them into outpatient treatment. Goodman would have periodic hearings to determine the patient's compliance with the treatment plan. Patients who did not follow the treatment plan faced sanctions, a modification of the plan, or if they were on diversion their original charge could be set for trial.

Goodman's concept and the original mental health court were dissolved in the early 1990s. In 1995, Goodman was reprimanded for nepotism.

In the mid-1990s, many of the professional mental health workers who had worked with Goodman sought to re-establish a mental health court in Indianapolis. Representatives of the county's mental health service providers and other stake holders began meeting weekly. The group decided to accept the name of the PAIR Program (PAIR stood for Psychiatric Assertive Identification and Referral). After, a couple years of lobbying the local authorities in Marion County, Indiana, the mental health court began as a formal program in 1996. Many consider this to be the nation's first mental health court in this second wave of mental health court initiatives. Since the PAIR Program did not operate with any new funds, there was not much scholarly research and therefore the accomplishments of Goodman and the PAIR Program are frequently overlooked. The current PAIR Program is a comprehensive pretrial, post-booking diversion system for mentally ill offenders. A program launched in Broward County, Florida was the first court, to be recognized and published as a specialized mental health court. Overseen by Judge Ginger Lerner-Wren, the Broward County Mental Health Court was launched in 1997, partially in response to a series of suicides of people with mental illness in the county jail. The Broward court and three other early mental health courts, in Anchorage, Alaska, San Bernardino, California, and King County, Washington, were examined in a 2000 Bureau of Justice Assistance monograph, which was the first major study of this emerging judicial strategy.

Shortly after the establishment of the Broward County Mental Health Court, other mental health courts began to open in jurisdictions around the U.S., launched by practitioners who believed that standard punishments were ineffective when applied to the mentally ill. In Alaska, for example, the state's first mental health court (established in Anchorage in 1998) was spearheaded by Judge Stephanie Rhoades, who felt probation alone was inadequate. "I started seeing a lot of people in criminal misdemeanors who were cycling through the system and who simply did not understand their probation conditions or what they were doing in jail. I saw police arresting people in order to get them help. I felt there had to be a better solution," she explained in an interview. Mental health courts were also inspired by the movement to develop other problem-solving courts, such as drug courts, domestic violence courts, community courts and parole reentry courts. The overarching motivation behind the development of these courts was rising caseloads and increasing frustration—both among the public and among system players—with the standard approach to case processing and case outcomes in state courts. In February 2001, the first juvenile mental health court opened in Santa Clara, California.

Since 2000, the number of mental health courts has expanded rapidly. There are an estimated 150 courts in the U.S. and dozens more are being planned. An ongoing survey conducted by several organizations identified more than 120 mental health courts across the country as of 2006. The proliferation of courts was spurred in large part by the federal Mental Health Courts Program administered by the Bureau of Justice Assistance, which provided funding to 37 courts in 2002 and 2003.

In England, UK, two pilot mental health courts was launched in 2009 in response to a review of people with mental health problems in the criminal justice system. They were considered a success which met needs that would have otherwise gone unmet; however they required financial support and wider changes to the system, and it is not clear whether they will be more broadly implemented.

== Definition ==
Mental health courts vary from jurisdiction to jurisdiction, but most share a number of characteristics. The Council of State Governments Justice Center has defined the "essential elements" of mental health courts. The CSG Justice Center, in a publication detailing the essential elements, notes that the majority of mental health courts share the following characteristics:

- A specialized court docket, which employs a problem-solving approach to court processing in lieu of more traditional court procedures for certain defendants with mental illness.
- Judicially supervised, community-based treatment plans for each defendant participating in the court, which a team of court staff and mental health professionals design and implement.
- Regular status hearings at which treatment plans and other conditions are periodically reviewed for appropriateness, incentives are offered to reward adherence to court conditions, and sanctions are imposed on participants who do not adhere to the conditions of participation.
- Criteria defining a participant's completion of (sometimes called graduation from) the program.

== Court process ==
Potential participants in a mental health court are usually screened early on in the criminal process, either at the jail or by court staff such as pretrial services officers or social workers in the public defender's office. Most courts have criteria related to what kind of charges, criminal histories, and diagnoses will be accepted. For example, a court may accept only defendants charged with misdemeanors, who have no history of violent crimes, and who have an Axis I diagnoses as defined by the DSM-IV.

Defendants who fit the criteria based on the initial screening are usually given a more comprehensive assessment to determine their interest in participating and their community treatment needs. Defendants who agree to participate receive a treatment plan and other community supervision conditions. For those who adhere to their treatment plan for the agreed upon time, usually between six months and two years, their cases are either dismissed or the sentence is greatly reduced. If the defendant does not comply with the conditions of the court, or decides to leave the program, their case returns to the original criminal calendar where the prosecution proceeds as normal. As a rule, most mental health courts use a variety of intermediate sanctions in response to noncompliance before ending a defendant's participation. An essential component of mental health court programs for protection of the public is a dynamic risk management process that involves court supervised case management with interactive court review and assessment.

As in other problem-solving courts, the judge in a mental health court plays a larger role than a judge in a conventional court. Problem-solving courts rely upon the active use of judicial authority to solve problems and to change the behavior of litigants. For instance, in a problem-solving court, the same judge presides at every hearing. The rationale behind this is not only to ensure that the presiding judge is trained in pertinent concepts, such as mental illness, drug addiction, or domestic violence, but also to foster an ongoing relationship between the judge and participants. Although the judge has final say over a case, mental health courts also take a team approach in which the defense counsel, prosecutor, case managers, treatment professionals, and community supervision personnel (for example, probation) work collaboratively to, for example, craft systems of sanctions and rewards for offenders in drug treatment. Many mental health courts also employ a full-time coordinator who manages the docket and facilitates communication between the different team members.

== Criticisms ==
Some have criticized mental health courts for deepening, as opposed to lessening, the involvement of people with mental illness in the criminal justice system. They argued that this was particularly true in mental health courts that focus on misdemeanor offenders who would have received short jail sentences or probation if not for the mental health court. These critics urged mental health courts to accept defendants charged with felonies, which many of the more recent courts, such as the Brooklyn Mental Health Court, have started to do.

Critics have also raised concerns about the use of mental health courts to coerce people into treatment, the requirement in some courts that defendants enter a guilty plea prior to entering the court, and about infringement on the privacy of treatment information. Furthermore, many have noted that the rise of mental health courts is, in large part, the result of an underfunded and ineffective community mental health system, and without attention to the deficiencies in community treatment resources, mental health courts can only have a limited impact. Finally, it has been noted that when scarce mental health services are redirected to those who have come in contact with the criminal justice system, it creates a perversion in the system were a person's best bet for obtaining services is to get arrested.

== Outcomes ==
Several studies of the Broward County court were released in 2002 and 2003 and found that participation in the court led to a greater connection to services. A 2004 study of the Santa Barbara County, California, Mental Health Court found that participants had reduced criminal activity during their participation. An evaluation of the Brooklyn Mental Health Court documented improvements in several outcome measures, including substance abuse, psychiatric hospitalizations, homelessness and recidivism. In a 2011 meta-analysis of literature on the effectiveness of mental health courts in the United States, it was found that mental health courts reduced recidivism by an overall effect size of −0.54. In 2012, an Urban Institute evaluation found that participants in two New York City mental health courts were significantly less likely to re-offend than similar offenders whose cases are handled in the traditional court system. A review published in 2019 concerned with drug-using offenders with co-occurring mental health problems found that mental health courts may help people reduce future drug use and criminal activity.

=== Mental health service as an intensive monitoring service ===
A study conducted in Washington state in 2019 had found that timely mental health services is associated with the risk of incarceration. It was shown in this finding that timely mental health services can be a catalyst for deeper involvement in the criminal justice system since the mental health service can act as a form of monitoring, resulting in higher technical violations in relation to higher supervision. Other studies show that more involvement of mental health services, or more supervision of the individual receiving treatment, is positively correlated with higher levels of recidivism.

== See also ==
- Mentally ill prisoners in the United States
- Therapeutic jurisprudence

== Sources ==
- "Improving Responses to People with Mental Illnesses: The Essential Elements of a Mental Health Court" (PDF). Council of State Governments Justice Center and the Criminal Justice/Mental Health Consensus Project.
- Council of State Governments (2005). A Guide to Mental Health Court Design and Implementation. New York, NY: Council of State Governments, 2005.
- Goldkamp, John S. and Cheryl Irons-Guynn (2000). Bureau of Justice Assistance. Emerging Judicial Strategies For the Mentally Ill in the Criminal Caseload: Mental Health Courts in Fort Lauderdale, Seattle, San Bernardino, and Anchorage. Washington, D.C.: U.S. Department of Justice. EMERGING JUDICIAL STRATEGIES FOR THE MENTALLY ILL IN THE CRIMINAL CASELOAD: MENTAL HEALTH COURTS IN FORT LAUDERDALE, SEATTLE, SAN BERNARDINO, AND ANCHORAGE
- Redlich, Allison D. et al. (2005). "The Second Generation of Mental Health Courts." Psychology, Public Policy, and Law. 2005 Dec Vol 11(4) 527–538.
- Sarah Ryan and Darius Whelan, 'Diversion of Offenders with Mental Disorders: Mental Health Courts' (2012) 1 Web Journal of Current Legal Issues
- Schneider, RD, Bloom, H and Heerema, M (2007) Mental Health Courts. Decriminalizing the Mentally Ill (Toronto: Irwin Law)
- States Try Out Courts Tailored for Mentally Ill, NPR, 2006-08-21.
- The Brooklyn Mental Health Court Evaluation: Planning, Implementation, Courtroom Dynamics, and Participant Outcomes
- Criminal Justice/Mental Health Information Network
- Berman, Greg; John Feinblatt (2005). Good Courts: The Case for Problem-Solving Justice. New York, New York: The New Press. p. 237. ISBN 1-56584-973-6.
- National Alliance on Mental Illness
