= 2016–17 Navy Midshipmen women's basketball team =

Intercollegiate basketball season

2016–17 Navy Midshipmen women's basketball

WNIT, Second Round
- Conference: Patriot League
- Record: 24–10 (14–4 Patriot)
- Head coach: Stefanie Pemper (9th season)
- Assistant coaches: Jimmy Colloton; Ryenn Micaletti; Katie Rokus; Rebecca Tillett
- Home arena: Alumni Hall

2016–17 Patriot League women's basketball standings
	Conf.				Overall
Team	W		L	PCT	W		L	PCT
Bucknell †	16	–	2	.889	27	–	6	.818
Navy	14	–	4	.778	24	–	10	.706
Army	12	–	6	.667	22	–	9	.710
American	11	–	7	.611	15	–	16	.484
Boston University	11	–	7	.611	13	–	17	.433
Colgate	7	–	11	.389	10	–	20	.333
Loyola (MD)	6	–	12	.333	11	–	20	.355
Holy Cross	6	–	12	.333	8	–	21	.276
Lehigh	5	–	13	.278	10	–	20	.333
Lafayette	2	–	16	.111	4	–	28	.125
† 2017 Patriot League tournament winner As of March 4, 2017; Rankings from AP poll

The 2016–17 Navy Midshipmen women's basketball team represented the United States Naval Academy during the 2016–17 NCAA Division I women's basketball season. The Midshipmen, led by ninth year head coach Stefanie Pemper, played their home games at Alumni Hall and were members of the Patriot League. They advanced to the championship of the Patriot League women's tournament where they lost to Bucknell. They received an automatic bid to the Women's National Invitation Tournament they defeated George Washington in the first round before losing to Virginia Tech in the second round.

== Roster ==
2016–17 Navy Midshipmen women's basketball team
Players
Coaches

Pos.	#	Name	Height	Year	Previous school	Hometown
G	1	Taylor Durham	5 ft 4 in (1.63 m)	Jr	Mount Vernon	Fort Belvoir, VA
G	2	Sara Jones	5 ft 9 in (1.75 m)	So	Northwestern Lehigh	New Tripoli, PA
G	5	Sarita Condie	5 ft 7 in (1.7 m)	Sr	Pershing County	Lovelock, NV
F	10	Laurel Jaunich	6 ft 0 in (1.83 m)	Fr	Champlain Valley Union	Charlotte, VT
F	11	Kaila Clark	5 ft 11 in (1.8 m)	Fr	Archbishop Spalding	Hughesville, MD
G	13	Hannah Fenske	5 ft 8 in (1.73 m)	Jr	Volcano Vista	Albuquerque, NM
G	15	Bianca Roach	5 ft 7 in (1.7 m)	So	Cape Henry Collegiate	Virginia Beach, VA
G	21	Justice Swett	5 ft 8 in (1.73 m)	Sr	Ensworth	Nashville, TN
G	23	Molly Sanders	5 ft 7 in (1.7 m)	So	Ames	Ames, IA
F	25	Ashanti Kennedy	5 ft 8 in (1.73 m)	Sr	Cape Henry Collegiate	Virginia Beach, VA
G	30	Morgan Taylor	5 ft 7 in (1.7 m)	Fr	Greenbrier	Evans, GA
G	50	Mary Kate Ulasewicz	5 ft 5 in (1.65 m)	Fr	Mount Saint Joseph	Doylestown, PA

Head coach

- Stefanie Pemper (Idaho State)

Assistant coach(es)

- Jimmy Colloton (Wittenberg)
- Ryenn Micaletti (Seton Hill)
- Katie Rokus (USC Aiken)
- Rebecca Tillett (William & Mary)

Legend

- (C) Team captain
- (S) Suspended
- (I) Ineligible
- (W) Walk-on
- Injured
- Current redshirt

Roster

== Schedule ==
Date time, TV	Rank^{#}	Opponent^{#}	Result	Record	Site (attendance) city, state
Non-conference regular season
11/11/2016*; 4:00 pm		at Wake Forest	L 65–75	0–1	LJVM Coliseum (882); Winston-Salem, NC
11/13/2016*; 2:00 pm		at No. 13 Tennessee	L 55–85	0–2	Thompson–Boling Arena (8,212); Knoxville, TN
11/18/2016*; 7:00 pm		Hofstra	W 78–69	1–2	Alumni Hall (508); Annapolis, MD
11/21/2016*; 7:00 pm		Iona	W 73–68	2–2	Alumni Hall (307); Annapolis, MD
11/25/2016*; 5:00 pm		at Nevada; Nugget Classic semifinals	W 79–62	3–2	Lawlor Events Center (1,662); Reno, NV
11/26/2016*; 7:30 pm		vs. Arkansas; Nugget Classic championship	L 67–70	3–3	Lawlor Events Center (838); Reno, NV
11/29/2016*; 8:00 pm		at Air Force	W 64–46	4–3	Clune Arena (535); Colorado Springs, CO
12/03/2016*; 8:15 pm		Cleveland State; Navy Classic	W 88–63	5–3	Alumni Hall (297); Annapolis, MD
12/04/2016*; 4:15 pm		Liberty; Navy Classic	W 67–66	6–3	Alumni Hall (235); Annapolis, MD
12/07/2016*; 7:00 pm		Goucher	W 93–40	7–3	Alumni Hall (227); Annapolis, MD
12/20/2016*; 7:00 pm		at George Mason	L 64–68 ^{OT}	7–4	Recreation Athletic Complex (483); Fairfax, VA
Patriot League regular season
12/30/2016; 6:00 pm		at Bucknell	L 64–67	7–5 (0–1)	Sojka Pavilion (597); Lewisburg, PA
01/02/2017; 1:00 pm		Holy Cross	W 57–56	8–5 (1–1)	Alumni Hall (434); Annapolis, MD
01/06/2017; 7:00 pm		at Boston University	W 62–59	9–5 (2–1)	Case Gym (172); Boston, MA
01/08/2017; 2:00 pm		at Colgate	W 80–67	10–5 (3–1)	Cotterell Court (593); Hamilton, NY
01/11/2017; 7:00 pm		Loyola (MD)	W 77–51	11–5 (4–1)	Alumni Hall (1,008); Annapolis, MD
01/14/2017; 7:00 pm		Lafayette	W 76–41	12–5 (5–1)	Alumni Hall (622); Annapolis, MD
01/18/2017; 7:00 pm		at Lehigh	W 66–64	13–5 (6–1)	Stabler Arena (639); Bethlehem, PA
01/21/2017; 11:00 am, CBSSN		at Army	W 63–58	14–5 (7–1)	Christl Arena (5,291); West Point, NY
01/28/2017; 1:00 pm		at Holy Cross	W 73–71	15–5 (8–1)	Hart Center (1,244); Worcester, MA
02/02/2017; 7:00 pm		Boston University	W 55–41	16–5 (9–1)	Alumni Hall (422); Annapolis, MD
02/04/2017; 4:00 pm		Colgate	L 61–69	16–6 (9–2)	Alumni Hall (723); Annapolis, MD
02/08/2017; 7:00 pm		at Loyola (MD)	W 55–43	17–6 (10–2)	Reitz Arena (274); Baltimore, MD
02/11/2017; 2:00 pm		at Lafayette	W 68–65	18–6 (11–2)	Kirby Sports Center (572); Easton, PA
02/15/2017; 7:00 pm		Lehigh	W 69–37	19–6 (12–2)	Alumni Hall (428); Annapolis, MD
02/18/2017; 11:00 am, CBSSN		Army	W 67–62	20–6 (13–2)	Alumni Hall (5,710); Annapolis, MD
02/22/2017; 7:00 pm		at American	L 48–50	20–7 (13–3)	Bender Arena (433); Washington, D.C.
02/25/2017; 7:00 pm		Bucknell	L 54–63	20–8 (13–4)	Alumni Hall (1,086); Annapolis, MD
03/01/2017; 7:00 pm		American	W 60–44	21–8 (14–4)	Alumni Hall (1,137); Annapolis, MD
Patriot League Women's Tournament
03/06/2017; 7:00 pm	(2)	(10) Lafayette; Quarterfinals	W 53–37	22–8	Alumni Hall (587); Annapolis, MD
03/10/2017; 7:30 pm	(2)	vs. (3) Army; Semifinals	W 54–53	23–8	Sojka Pavilion (1,337); Lewisburg, PA
03/12/2017; 11:00 am, CBSSN	(2)	at (1) Bucknell; Championship Game	L 71–79	23–9	Sojka Pavilion (1,231); Lewisburg, PA
WNIT
03/17/2017*; 7:00 pm		at George Washington; First Round	W 61–51 ^{OT}	24–9	Charles E. Smith Center (412); Washington, D.C.
03/19/2017*; 2:00 pm		at Virginia Tech; Second Round	L 52–71	24–10	Cassell Coliseum (768); Blacksburg, VA
*Non-conference game. ^{#}Rankings from AP Poll. (#) Tournament seedings in parentheses. All times are in Eastern Time.

== See also ==
2016–17 Navy Midshipmen men's basketball team
