= 2016–17 Boston University Terriers women's basketball team =

Intercollegiate basketball season

2016–17 Boston University Terriers women's basketball
- Conference: Patriot League
- Record: 13–17 (11–7 Patriot)
- Head coach: Katy Steding (3rd season)
- Assistant coaches: Cindy Blodgett; Jenny Thigpin; Ben Chase
- Home arena: Case Gym

2016–17 Patriot League women's basketball standings
	Conf.				Overall
Team	W		L	PCT	W		L	PCT
Bucknell †	16	–	2	.889	27	–	6	.818
Navy	14	–	4	.778	24	–	10	.706
Army	12	–	6	.667	22	–	9	.710
American	11	–	7	.611	15	–	16	.484
Boston University	11	–	7	.611	13	–	17	.433
Colgate	7	–	11	.389	10	–	20	.333
Loyola (MD)	6	–	12	.333	11	–	20	.355
Holy Cross	6	–	12	.333	8	–	21	.276
Lehigh	5	–	13	.278	10	–	20	.333
Lafayette	2	–	16	.111	4	–	28	.125
† 2017 Patriot League tournament winner As of March 4, 2017; Rankings from AP poll

The 2016–17 Boston University Terriers women's basketball team represented Boston University during the 2016–17 NCAA Division I women's basketball season. The Terries, led by third year head coach Katy Steding, played their home games at Case Gym and were members of the Patriot League. They finished the season 13–17, 11–7 in Patriot League play to finish in a tie for fourth place. They lost in the quarterfinals of the Patriot League women's tournament to American.

== Roster ==
2016–17 Boston University Terriers women's basketball team
Players
Coaches

Pos.	#	Name	Height	Year	Previous school	Hometown
C	1	Sophie Beaudry	6 ft 5 in (1.96 m)	RS Jr	Dawson College; Monmouth	Chambly, QE
F	3	Naiyah Thompson	5 ft 11 in (1.8 m)	So	St. Mary's Ryken	Leonard, MD
G	4	Payton Hauck	5 ft 9 in (1.75 m)	So	Northeastern	York, PA
G	11	Meghan Doogan	5 ft 9 in (1.75 m)	Jr	Concord	Claymont, DE
G	12	Sarah Hope	5 ft 7 in (1.7 m)	Sr	Medway	Medway, MA
G	14	Courtney Latham	5 ft 8 in (1.73 m)	Sr	Glastonbury	Glastonbury, CT
F	20	Nia Irving	6 ft 1 in (1.85 m)	Fr	Lawrence	Fairfield, ME
G	21	Lauren Spearman	5 ft 7 in (1.7 m)	So	Marlborough School	Los Angeles, CA
G	22	Corrine Williams	6 ft 1 in (1.85 m)	Jr	Bloomfield	Bloomfield, CT
G	30	Vanessa Edgehill	5 ft 8 in (1.73 m)	Fr	The Rivers School	Franklin, MA
F	33	Meghan Green	6 ft 0 in (1.83 m)	Sr	Bishop Guetrin	Bedford, NH
F	34	Erin Bayram	6 ft 2 in (1.88 m)	Jr	Batavia	Batavia, IL
F	52	Kara Sheftic	6 ft 1 in (1.85 m)	Jr	Essex	Essex Junction, VT

Head coach

- Katy Steding (Stanford)

Assistant coach(es)

- Cindy Blodgett (Maine)
- Jenny Thigpin (Fresno State)
- Ben Chase (Emerson)

Legend

- (C) Team captain
- (S) Suspended
- (I) Ineligible
- (W) Walk-on
- Injured
- Current redshirt

Roster

== Schedule ==
Date time, TV	Rank^{#}	Opponent^{#}	Result	Record	Site (attendance) city, state
Non-conference regular season
11/11/2016*; 3:00 pm, NESN		at Northeastern	L 59–78	0–1	Cabot Center (412); Boston, MA
11/14/2016*; 7:00 pm		at Boston College; Green Line Rivalry	L 49–67	0–2	Conte Forum (623); Chestnut Hill, MA
11/19/2016*; 7:00 pm		at Albany	L 54–69	0–3	SEFCU Arena (1,119); Albany, NY
11/22/2016*; 7:00 pm		Harvard	L 52–65	0–4	Case Gym (262); Boston, MA
11/26/2016*; 2:00 pm		UMass Lowell	W 66–56	1–4	Case Gym (166); Boston, MA
11/28/2016*; 7:00 pm		New Hampshire	L 51–59	1–5	Case Gym (151); Boston, MA
12/03/2016*; 2:00 pm		at Arizona State; ASU Classic semifinals	L 42–71	1–6	Wells Fargo Arena (1,428); Tempe, AZ
12/04/2016*; 1:30 pm		vs. Long Beach State; ASU Classic 3rd place game	L 48–61	1–7	Wells Fargo Arena; Tempe, AZ
12/07/2016*; 5:30 pm		Dartmouth	L 49–61	1–8	Case Gym; Boston, MA
12/10/2016*; 7:00 pm		at Marist	L 57–76	1–9	McCann Field House (1,310); Poughkeepsie, NY
12/14/2016*; 7:00 pm		Massachusetts	W 64–60	2–9	Case Gym (186); Boston, MA
Patriot League regular season
12/30/2016; 1:00 pm		at Holy Cross	W 66–49	3–9 (1–0)	Hart Center (1,147); Worcester, MA
01/02/2017; 2:00 pm		at Lehigh	W 69–64	4–9 (2–0)	Stabler Arena (566); Bethlehem, PA
01/06/2017; 7:00 pm		Navy	L 59–62	4–10 (2–1)	Case Gym (172); Boston, MA
01/08/2017; 2:00 pm		Lafayette	W 68–50	5–10 (3–1)	Case Gym (137); Boston, MA
01/11/2017; 7:00 pm		at American	L 62–73	5–11 (3–2)	Bender Arena (303); Washington, D.C.
01/14/2017; 2:00 pm		Loyola (MD)	W 61–58	6–11 (4–2)	Case Gym (231); Boston, MA
01/18/2017; 7:00 pm		at Colgate	L 87–96 ^{2OT}	6–12 (4–3)	Cotterell Court (573); Hamilton, NY
01/21/2017; 7:00 pm		Bucknell	L 50–66	6–13 (4–4)	Case Gym (186); Boston, MA
01/28/2017; 7:00 pm		Lehigh	W 64–50	7–13 (5–4)	Case Gym (383); Boston, MA
02/02/2017; 7:00 pm		at Navy	L 41–55	7–14 (5–5)	Alumni Hall (422); Annapolis, MD
02/04/2017; 2:00 pm		at Lafayette	W 75–58	8–14 (6–5)	Kirby Sports Center (347); Easton, PA
02/08/2017; 7:00 pm		American	W 71–62	9–14 (7–5)	Case Gym (365); Boston, MA
02/11/2017; 2:00 pm		at Loyola (MD)	W 67–55	10–14 (8–5)	Reitz Arena (282); Baltimore, MD
02/15/2017; 7:00 pm		Colgate	W 65–51	11–14 (9–5)	Case Gym (220); Boston, MA
02/18/2017; 7:00 pm		at Bucknell	L 56–73	11–15 (9–6)	Sojka Pavilion (736); Lewisburg, PA
02/22/2017; 7:00 pm		Army	L 52–64	11–16 (9–7)	Case Gym (302); Boston, MA
02/25/2017; 2:00 pm		Holy Cross	W 68–56	12–16 (10–7)	Case Gym (415); Boston, MA
03/01/2017; 7:00 pm		at Army	W 66–62	13–16 (11–7)	Christl Arena (572); West Point, NY
Patriot League Women's Tournament
03/06/2017; 7:00 pm	(5)	at (4) American; Quarterfinals	L 51–57	13–17	Bender Arena (305); Washington, D.C.
*Non-conference game. ^{#}Rankings from AP Poll. (#) Tournament seedings in parentheses. All times are in Eastern Time.

== See also ==
2016–17 Boston University Terriers men's basketball team
