= 2016–17 Lehigh Mountain Hawks women's basketball team =

Intercollegiate basketball season

2016–17 Lehigh Mountain Hawks women's basketball
- Conference: Patriot League
- Record: 10–20 (5–13 Patriot)
- Head coach: Sue Troyan (22nd season)
- Assistant coaches: Glenn Rigney; Caitlin Gillard; Maggie Serratelli
- Home arena: Stabler Arena

2016–17 Patriot League women's basketball standings
	Conf.				Overall
Team	W		L	PCT	W		L	PCT
Bucknell †	16	–	2	.889	27	–	6	.818
Navy	14	–	4	.778	24	–	10	.706
Army	12	–	6	.667	22	–	9	.710
American	11	–	7	.611	15	–	16	.484
Boston University	11	–	7	.611	13	–	17	.433
Colgate	7	–	11	.389	10	–	20	.333
Loyola (MD)	6	–	12	.333	11	–	20	.355
Holy Cross	6	–	12	.333	8	–	21	.276
Lehigh	5	–	13	.278	10	–	20	.333
Lafayette	2	–	16	.111	4	–	28	.125
† 2017 Patriot League tournament winner As of March 4, 2017; Rankings from AP poll

The 2016–17 Lehigh Mountain Hawks women's basketball team represented Lehigh University during the 2016–17 NCAA Division I women's basketball season. The Mountain Hawks, led by twenty-second year head coach Sue Troyan, played their home games at Stabler Arena and were members of the Patriot League. They finished the season 10–20, 5–13 in Patriot League play to finish in ninth place. They lost in the first round of the Patriot League women's tournament where they lost to Loyola (MD).

== Roster ==
2016–17 Lehigh Mountain Hawks women's basketball team
Players
Coaches

Pos.	#	Name	Height	Year	Previous school	Hometown
G	5	Bernadette Devaney	5 ft 8 in (1.73 m)	Jr	Nova	Cooper City, FL
G/F	10	Kiernan McCloskey	6 ft 1 in (1.85 m)	Sr	Germantown Academy	Lower Gwynedd, PA
G	11	Taylor Campbell	5 ft 9 in (1.75 m)	Jr	Marquette	Chesterfield, MO
F	12	Gena Grundhoffer	6 ft 1 in (1.85 m)	Fr	Assumption	Wisconsin Rapids, WI
C	13	Megan Eripret	6 ft 3 in (1.91 m)	So	Salisbury	Allentown, PA
G	14	Paige Galiani	5 ft 10 in (1.78 m)	Fr	Langley	Great Falls, VA
G	15	Camrym Buhr	6 ft 1 in (1.85 m)	Fr	Penn	Misawaka, WI
G	20	Quinci Mann	5 ft 10 in (1.78 m)	Jr	St. Ignatius Prep	Oakland, CA
G	22	Hannah Hedstrom	5 ft 9 in (1.75 m)	Fr	Minnetonka	Minnetonka, MN
G	23	Kari Moffat	5 ft 6 in (1.68 m)	Sr	Adlai E. Stevenson	Lincolnshire, IL
F	24	Bryce Menendez	6 ft 2 in (1.88 m)	So	Neuqua Valley	Naperville, IL
G	25	Kayla Burton	5 ft 8 in (1.73 m)	Sr	Newton South	Newton, MA
F	30	Cameryn Benz	6 ft 3 in (1.91 m)	Sr	Montgomery	Montgomery, NJ
G	33	Hailey Pascoe	5 ft 9 in (1.75 m)	So	Clayton Valley HS	Concord, CA
F	44	Mae Williams	6 ft 0 in (1.83 m)	Jr	Monarch HS	Lafayette, OH

Head coach

- Sue Troyan (Dickinson)

Assistant coach(es)

- Glenn Rigney (Miami (FL))
- Caitlin Gillard (Colgate)
- Maggie Serratelli (Holy Family)

Legend

- (C) Team captain
- (S) Suspended
- (I) Ineligible
- (W) Walk-on
- Injured
- Current redshirt

Roster

== Schedule ==
Date time, TV	Rank^{#}	Opponent^{#}	Result	Record	Site (attendance) city, state
Non-conference regular season
11/11/2016*; 7:00 pm		East Stroudsburg	W 78–72	1–0	Stabler Arena (584); Bethlehem, PA
11/13/2016*; 2:00 pm		at Duquesne	L 49–63	1–1	Palumbo Center (553); Pittsburgh, PA
11/16/2016*; 11:00 am, SE2		Delaware State	W 91–80	2–1	Stabler Arena (4,410); Bethlehem, PA
11/19/2016*; 7:00 pm		Sacred Heart	W 68–62	3–1	Stabler Arena (542); Bethlehem, PA
11/22/2016*; 4:00 pm		at Mount St. Mary's	W 74–57	4–1	Knott Arena (265); Emmitsburg, MD
11/26/2016*; 4:00 pm		Norfolk State; Christmas City Classic semifinals	L 57–81	4–2	Stabler Arena (781); Bethlehem, PA
11/27/2016*; 2:00 pm		Monmouth; Christmas City Classic 3rd place game	L 62–73	4–3	Stabler Arena (544); Bethlehem, PA
11/30/2016*; 7:00 pm		NJIT	W 84–52	5–3	Stabler Arena (537); Bethlehem, PA
12/05/2016*; 7:00 pm		at Villanova	L 37–59	5–4	The Pavilion (509); Villanova, PA
12/08/2016*; 7:00 pm		Rider	L 68–75	5–5	Stabler Arena (467); Bethlehem, PA
12/11/2016*; 5:00 pm		at California	L 63–96	5–6	Haas Pavilion (1,561); Berkeley, CA
Patriot League regular season
12/30/2016; 7:00 pm, SE2		Army	L 71–75	5–7 (0–1)	Stabler Arena (779); Bethlehem, PA
01/02/2017; 2:00 pm, SE2		Boston University	L 64–69	5–8 (0–2)	Stabler Arena (566); Bethlehem, PA
01/05/2017; 7:00 pm		at Loyola (MD)	L 58–62	5–9 (0–3)	Reitz Arena (136); Baltimore, MD
01/07/2017; 4:00 pm		at American	L 51–68	5–10 (0–4)	Bender Arena (354); Washington, D.C.
01/11/2017; 7:00 pm, SE2		Bucknell	L 58–77	5–11 (0–5)	Stabler Arena (592); Bethlehem, PA
01/14/2017; 1:00 pm		at Holy Cross	L 47–65	5–12 (0–6)	Hart Center (963); Worcester, MA
01/18/2017; 7:00 pm, SE2		Navy	L 64–66	5–13 (0–7)	Stabler Arena (639); Bethlehem, PA
01/21/2017; 7:00 pm		at Lafayette	W 56–53	6–13 (1–7)	Kirby Sports Center (744); Easton, PA
01/28/2017; 2:00 pm		at Boston University	L 50–64	6–14 (1–8)	Case Gym (383); Boston, MA
02/01/2017; 7:00 pm, SE2		Loyola (MD)	W 86–69	7–14 (2–8)	Stabler Arena (731); Bethlehem, PA
02/04/2017; 2:00 pm, SE2		American	L 58–70	7–15 (2–9)	Stabler Arena (707); Bethlehem, PA
02/08/2017; 7:00 pm		at Bucknell	L 54–73	7–16 (2–10)	Sojka Pavilion (469); Lewisburg, PA
02/11/2017; 2:00 pm, SE2		Holy Cross	W 80–64	8–16 (3–10)	Stabler Arena (867); Bethlehem, PA
02/15/2017; 7:00 pm		at Navy	L 37–69	8–17 (3–11)	Alumni Hall (428); Annapolis, MD
02/18/2017; 2:00 pm, SE2		Lafayette	W 69–60	9–17 (4–11)	Stabler Arena (827); Bethlehem, PA
02/22/2017; 7:00 pm		at Colgate	L 70–75	9–18 (4–12)	Cotterell Court (823); Hamilton, NY
02/25/2017; 3:00 pm		at Army	L 52–70	9–19 (4–13)	Christl Arena (1,215); West Point, NY
03/01/2017; 7:00 pm, SE2		Colgate	W 83–74	10–19 (5–13)	Stabler Arena (551); Bethlehem, PA
Patriot League Women's Tournament
03/04/2017; 7:00 pm	(9)	at (8) Loyola (MD); First Round	L 50–78	10–20	Reitz Arena (247); Baltimore, MD
*Non-conference game. ^{#}Rankings from AP Poll. (#) Tournament seedings in parentheses. All times are in Eastern Time.

== See also ==
- 2016–17 Lehigh Mountain Hawks men's basketball team
