= 2016–17 American Eagles women's basketball team =

Intercollegiate basketball season

2016–17 American Eagles women's basketball
- Conference: Patriot League
- Record: 15–16 (11–7 Patriot)
- Head coach: Megan Gebbia (4th season)
- Assistant coaches: Tiffany Coll; Nikki Flores; Emily Stallings
- Home arena: Bender Arena

2016–17 Patriot League women's basketball standings
	Conf.				Overall
Team	W		L	PCT	W		L	PCT
Bucknell †	16	–	2	.889	27	–	6	.818
Navy	14	–	4	.778	24	–	10	.706
Army	12	–	6	.667	22	–	9	.710
American	11	–	7	.611	15	–	16	.484
Boston University	11	–	7	.611	13	–	17	.433
Colgate	7	–	11	.389	10	–	20	.333
Loyola (MD)	6	–	12	.333	11	–	20	.355
Holy Cross	6	–	12	.333	8	–	21	.276
Lehigh	5	–	13	.278	10	–	20	.333
Lafayette	2	–	16	.111	4	–	28	.125
† 2017 Patriot League tournament winner As of March 4, 2017; Rankings from AP poll

The 2016–17 American Eagles women's basketball team represented American University during the 2016–17 NCAA Division I women's basketball season. The Eagles, led by fourth year head coach Megan Gebbia, played their home games at Bender Arena and were members of the Patriot League. They finished the season 15–16, 11–7 in Patriot League play to finish in a tie for fourth place. They advanced to the semifinals of the Patriot League women's tournament where they lost to Bucknell.

== Roster ==
2016–17 American Eagles women's basketball team
Players
Coaches

Pos.	#	Name	Height	Year	Previous school	Hometown
G	1	Asha Henley (W)	5 ft 5 in (1.65 m)	Jr	Blake	Silver Spring, Maryland
G	2	Brianna DuBose	5 ft 11 in (1.8 m)	RS Jr	Bishop McNamara; VCU	Bowie, Maryland
G	3	Kaitlyn Lewis	5 ft 7 in (1.7 m)	So	North Pocono	Scranton, Pennsylvania
G	4	Emily Kinneston	5 ft 8 in (1.73 m)	Jr	Champlain Valley Union	Shelburne, Vermont
F	10	Lauren Crisler	6 ft 2 in (1.88 m)	Sr	North Penn	North Wales, Pennsylvania
F	11	TaeKenya Cleveland	6 ft 0 in (1.83 m)	Fr	Regis Jesuit	Aurora, Colorado
F	13	Michaela Nieuwenhuizen	6 ft 3 in (1.91 m)	So	The Peddie School	Strathroy, ON
F	14	Maria Liddane	5 ft 8 in (1.73 m)	Jr	Grosse Point North	Grosse Pointe Woods, Michigan
G/F	20	Jordan Light	6 ft 0 in (1.83 m)	Sr	Good Counsel	Vienna, Virginia
G	21	Kate Bond	5 ft 9 in (1.75 m)	Jr	Mount St. Mary	Norman, Oklahoma
G	22	Katie Marnyi	5 ft 8 in (1.73 m)	Fr	Penn	Granger, Indiana
G	23	Elina Koskimies	6 ft 0 in (1.83 m)	So	Makelanrinne Sports High	Helsinki, Finland
F	25	Io Chaney	5 ft 11 in (1.8 m)	Jr	St. Vincent Pallotti; Norfolk State	Bowie, Maryland
G	32	Payton Turner	5 ft 6 in (1.68 m)	Fr	Princess Anne	Virginia Beach, Virginia
F	33	Michael Harris	6 ft 1 in (1.85 m)	Jr	Abington	Abington, Pennsylvania
F	44	Cecily Carl	6 ft 3 in (1.91 m)	So	Mechanicsburg	Mechanicsburg, Pennsylvania

Head coach

- Megan Gebbia (Towson)

Assistant coach(es)

- Tiffany Coll (UMBC)
- Nikki Flores (Marist)
- Emily Stallings (Marist)

Legend

- (C) Team captain
- (S) Suspended
- (I) Ineligible
- (W) Walk-on
- Injured
- Current redshirt

Roster

== Schedule ==
Date time, TV	Rank^{#}	Opponent^{#}	Result	Record	Site (attendance) city, state
Non-conference regular season
11/11/2016*; 7:00 pm		at Youngstown State	W 77–64	1–0	Beeghly Center; Youngstown, OH
11/16/2016*; 7:00 pm		Delaware	L 55–56 ^{OT}	1–1	Bender Arena (407); Washington, D.C.
11/20/2016*; 1:00 pm		at La Salle	L 59–63	1–2	Tom Gola Arena (352); Philadelphia, PA
11/24/2016*; 8:00 pm		vs. VCU; San Juan Shootout	L 62–68	1–3	Ocean Center; Daytona Beach, FL
11/25/2016*; 5:45 pm		vs. Georgia State; San Juan Shootout	L 58–59 ^{OT}	1–4	Ocean Center; Daytona Beach, FL
11/30/2016*; 7:00 pm		UMBC	W 70–53	2–4	Bender Arena (287); Washington, D.C.
12/03/2016*; 2:00 pm		William & Mary	L 34–48	2–5	Bender Arena (297); Washington, D.C.
12/07/2016*; 2:00 pm		George Washington	W 66–61 ^{OT}	3–5	Bender Arena (279); Washington, D.C.
12/10/2016*; 2:00 pm		at Hofstra	L 67–72 ^{OT}	3–6	Hofstra Arena (294); Hempstead, NY
12/18/2016*; 2:00 pm		at Penn State	L 65–70	3–7	Bryce Jordan Center (2,515); University Park, PA
12/22/2016*; 3:30 pm		at Michigan	L 33–82	3–8	Crisler Center (2,085); Ann Arbor, MI
Patriot League regular season
12/30/2016; 7:30 pm		at Loyola (MD)	W 60–45	4–8 (0–1)	Reitz Arena (256); Baltimore, MD
01/02/2017; 5:00 pm		Colgate	W 68–57	5–8 (2–0)	Bender Arena (321); Washington, D.C.
01/05/2017; 11:00 am		at Bucknell	L 67–73	5–9 (2–1)	Sojka Pavilion (814); Lewisburg, PA
01/07/2017; 4:00 pm		Lehigh	W 68–51	6–9 (3–1)	Bender Arena (354); Washington, D.C.
01/11/2017; 7:00 pm		Boston University	W 73–62	7–9 (4–1)	Bender Arena (303); Washington, D.C.
01/14/2017; 2:00 pm		at Army	L 51–53	7–10 (4–2)	Christl Arena (680); West Point, NY
01/18/2017; 7:00 pm		at Lafayette	W 76–52	8–10 (5–2)	Kirby Sports Center (304); Easton, PA
01/22/2017; 1:00 pm		Holy Cross	L 60–61	8–11 (5–3)	Bender Arena (381); Washington, D.C.
01/28/2017; 2:00 pm		at Colgate	W 73–62	9–11 (6–3)	Cotterell Court (738); Hamilton, NY
02/01/2017; 7:00 pm		Bucknell	W 59–47	10–11 (7–3)	Bender Arena (339); Washington, D.C.
02/04/2017; 2:00 pm		at Lehigh	W 70–58	11–11 (8–3)	Stabler Arena (707); Bethlehem, PA
02/08/2017; 7:00 pm		at Boston University	L 62–71	11–12 (8–4)	Case Gym (365); Boston, MA
02/11/2017; 2:00 pm		Army	L 57–68	11–13 (8–5)	Bender Arena (1,036); Washington, D.C.
02/15/2017; 7:00 pm		Lafayette	W 75–45	12–13 (9–5)	Bender Arena (342); Washington, D.C.
01/18/2017; 1:05 pm		at Holy Cross	L 46–51	12–14 (9–6)	Hart Center (1,138); Worcester, MA
02/22/2017; 7:00 pm		Navy	W 50–48	13–14 (9–6)	Bender Arena (433); Washington, D.C.
02/25/2017; 2:00 pm		Loyola (MD)	W 66–59	14–14 (10–6)	Bender Arena (504); Washington, D.C.
03/01/2017; 7:00 pm		at Navy	L 44–60	14–15 (11–7)	Alumni Hall (1,137); Annapolis, MD
Patriot League Women's Tournament
03/06/2017; 7:00 pm	(4)	(5) Boston University; Quarterfinals	W 57–51	15–15	Bender Arena (305); Washington, D.C.
03/10/2017; 5:00 pm	(4)	at (1) Bucknell; Semifinals	L 57–69	15–16	Sojka Pavilion (1,337); Lewisburg, PA
*Non-conference game. ^{#}Rankings from AP poll. (#) Tournament seedings in parentheses. All times are in Eastern Time.

== See also ==
- 2016–17 American Eagles men's basketball team
