= 2017 Patriot League women's basketball tournament =

- Classification: Division I
- Season: 2016–17
- Teams: 10
- Site: Campus sites
- Champions: Bucknell
- Television: PLN, CBSSN

2016–17 Patriot League women's basketball standings
| | Conf. | | | | Overall |
| Team | W | | L | PCT | W | | L | PCT |
|---|---|---|---|---|---|---|---|---|
| Bucknell † | 16 | – | 2 | .889 | 27 | – | 6 | .818 |
| Navy | 14 | – | 4 | .778 | 24 | – | 10 | .706 |
| Army | 12 | – | 6 | .667 | 22 | – | 9 | .710 |
| American | 11 | – | 7 | .611 | 15 | – | 16 | .484 |
| Boston University | 11 | – | 7 | .611 | 13 | – | 17 | .433 |
| Colgate | 7 | – | 11 | .389 | 10 | – | 20 | .333 |
| Loyola (MD) | 6 | – | 12 | .333 | 11 | – | 20 | .355 |
| Holy Cross | 6 | – | 12 | .333 | 8 | – | 21 | .276 |
| Lehigh | 5 | – | 13 | .278 | 10 | – | 20 | .333 |
| Lafayette | 2 | – | 16 | .111 | 4 | – | 28 | .125 |
† 2017 Patriot League tournament winner As of March 4, 2017; Rankings from AP poll

The 2017 Patriot League women's basketball tournament was held March 4, 6, 10, and 11 at campus sites of the higher seed, except that both semi-final games will be played at the same site of the highest seed. This means that Bucknell vs. American and Army vs. Navy will both be played in Lewisburg, Pennsylvania, at Sojka Pavilion on Friday, March 10, 2017, at 5:00pm and 7:30pm respectively. The winner of the tournament will earn an automatic trip to the NCAA women's tournament.

== Seeds ==
Teams are seeded by conference record, with ties broken in the following order:

- Head-to-head record between the teams involved in the tie
- Record against the highest-seeded team not involved in the tie, going down through the seedings as necessary
- Higher RPI entering the tournament, as published by College Basketball News

| Seed | School | Conference | Overall | Tiebreaker |
|---|---|---|---|---|
| 1 | Bucknell | 16–2 | 24–5 | |
| 2 | Navy | 14–4 | 21–8 | |
| 3 | Army | 12–6 | 21–8 | |
| 4 | American | 11–7 | 14–15 | 1–1 vs. BU, 1–1 vs. Buck |
| 5 | Boston | 11–7 | 13–16 | 1–1 vs. Amer, 0–2 vs. Buck |
| 6 | Colgate | 7–11 | 10–19 | |
| 7 | Holy Cross | 6–12 | 8–21 | 1–1 vs. L-MD, 1–1 vs. Buck |
| 8 | Loyola (MD) | 6–12 | 10–19 | 1–1 vs. Holy, 0–2 vs. Buck |
| 9 | Lehigh | 5–13 | 10–19 | |
| 10 | Lafayette | 2–16 | 3–27 | |

== Schedule ==
| Game | Time* | Matchup | Television | Attendance |
First round – Saturday, March 4
| 1 | 1:00 PM | #10 Lafayette at #7 Holy Cross | PLN | |
| 2 | 7:00 PM | #9 Lehigh at #8 Loyola (MD) | PLN | |
Quarterfinals – Monday, March 6
| 3 | 6:00 PM | #8 Loyola (MD) at #1 Bucknell | PLN | |
| 4 | 7:00 PM | #5 Boston at #4 American | PLN | |
| 5 | 7:00 PM | #6 Colgate at #3 Army | PLN | |
| 6 | 7:05 PM | #10 Lafayette at #2 Navy | PLN | |
Semifinals – Friday, March 10
| 7 | | #4 American at #1 Bucknell | PLN | |
| 8 | | #3 Army at #2 Navy | PLN | |
Championship – Saturday, March 11
| 9 | 6:00 pm | #2 Navy at #1 Bucknell | CBSSN | |
*Game times in ET. #-Rankings denote tournament seeding. All games hosted by higher-seeded team.

== Bracket ==
First round March 4 Patriot League Network
8 | Loyola (MD) | 78
9 | Lehigh | 50
7 | Holy Cross | 54
10 | Lafayette | 56

Quarterfinals; March 6 Patriot League Network
1 | Bucknell | 75
8 | Loyola (MD) | 72
4 | American | 57
5 | Boston | 51
2 | Navy | 53
10 | Lafayette | 37
3 | Army | 83
6 | Colgate | 76

Semifinals; March 10; Patriot League Network
1 | Bucknell | 69
4 | American | 57
2 | Navy | 54
3 | Army | 53

Championship; March 11; CBS Sports Network
1 | Bucknell | 79
2 | Navy | 71
