= Bruce Winick =

American legal scholar (1944–2010)

Bruce J. Winick (1944–2010) was an American legal scholar. He was the Silvers-Rubenstein Distinguished Professor of Law and a professor of psychiatry and behavioral sciences at the University of Miami in Coral Gables, Florida, where he taught from 1974. He worked in mental health law and in law and psychology, and was a co-founder of the field of therapeutic jurisprudence. He directed the University of Miami School of Law's Therapeutic Jurisprudence Center, and also worked as a civil rights lawyer and served as an expert witness on law-related issues. Winick died in 2010.

== Education ==
Winick graduated from Brooklyn College of the City University of New York in 1965 and from the New York University School of Law in 1968.

== Career ==
Before entering academia, Winick was director of court mental health services and general counsel of the department of mental health in New York City, where he also practiced law. He joined the University of Miami law faculty in 1974 and was the first chair of the Association of American Law Schools' Section on Balance in Legal Education.

Winick received several honors, including the University of Miami Provost's Award for Outstanding Scholarship, the Thurgood Marshall Award of the Association of the Bar of the City of New York, and the Human Rights Award of the American Immigration Lawyers Association. In 2007 he was named an honorary distinguished member of the American Psychology-Law Society, and in 2009 he received the Philippe Pinel Award of the International Academy of Law and Mental Health.

== Writing ==
Winick wrote or edited numerous books and more than 110 articles on mental health law, therapeutic jurisprudence, and related subjects. With legal scholar Amy D. Ronner, he co-authored "Silencing the Appellant's Voice: The Antitherapeutic Per Curiam Affirmance" (2000), which applied therapeutic jurisprudence to appellate litigation.

His books included:

- Law in a Therapeutic Key: Developments in Therapeutic Jurisprudence (1996, co-edited with David B. Wexler)
- The Right to Refuse Mental Health Treatment (1997)
- Therapeutic Jurisprudence Applied: Essays on Mental Health Law (1997)
- Judging in a Therapeutic Key: Therapeutic Jurisprudence and Problem Solving Courts (2003, co-edited with David B. Wexler)
- Civil Commitment: A Therapeutic Jurisprudence Model (2005)

== Personal life ==
Winick had four children.
