= 2016–17 Lafayette Leopards women's basketball team =

Intercollegiate basketball season

2016–17 Lafayette Leopards women's basketball
- Conference: Patriot League
- Record: 4–28 (2–16 Patriot)
- Head coach: Theresa Grentz (2nd season)
- Assistant coaches: C.K. Calhoun; Ross James; Kristen Foley
- Home arena: Kirby Sports Center

2016–17 Patriot League women's basketball standings
	Conf.				Overall
Team	W		L	PCT	W		L	PCT
Bucknell †	16	–	2	.889	27	–	6	.818
Navy	14	–	4	.778	24	–	10	.706
Army	12	–	6	.667	22	–	9	.710
American	11	–	7	.611	15	–	16	.484
Boston University	11	–	7	.611	13	–	17	.433
Colgate	7	–	11	.389	10	–	20	.333
Loyola (MD)	6	–	12	.333	11	–	20	.355
Holy Cross	6	–	12	.333	8	–	21	.276
Lehigh	5	–	13	.278	10	–	20	.333
Lafayette	2	–	16	.111	4	–	28	.125
† 2017 Patriot League tournament winner As of March 4, 2017; Rankings from AP poll

The 2016–17 Lafayette Leopards women's basketball team represented Lafayette College during the 2016–17 NCAA Division I women's basketball season. The Leopards, led by second year head coach Theresa Grentz, played their home games at Kirby Sports Center and were members of the Patriot League. They finished the season 4–28, 2–16 in Patriot League play to finish in last place. They advanced to the quarterfinals of the Patriot League women's tournament where they lost to Navy.

== Roster ==
2016–17 Lafayette Leopards women's basketball team
Players
Coaches

Pos.	#	Name	Height	Year	Previous school	Hometown
G/F	0	Olivia Gumbs	6 ft 1 in (1.85 m)	Fr	St. Andrew's School	Newark, DE
G	2	Nia Holland	5 ft 6 in (1.68 m)	So	Shipley School	Landsdowne, PA
G	5	Anna Ptasinski	5 ft 10 in (1.78 m)	Jr	Regis Jesuit	Highlands Ranch, CO
G	11	Alex Cantwell	5 ft 10 in (1.78 m)	So	North Shore	Glen Head, NY
G	13	Sarah Agnello	5 ft 10 in (1.78 m)	Fr	Villa Maria Academy	Erie, PA
F	14	Harriet Ottewill-Soulsby	6 ft 3 in (1.91 m)	Sr	Charnwood College	Loughborough, England
C	15	Angela Ribarich	6 ft 5 in (1.96 m)	So	St. Joseph's College	Toronto, ON
G	22	Sammy Stipa	5 ft 5 in (1.65 m)	Jr	Spring-Ford	Royersford, PA
G	23	Maia Hood	5 ft 9 in (1.75 m)	Sr	Alexander Hamilton	Elmsford, NY
F	24	Alexis Santarelli	6 ft 2 in (1.88 m)	Fr	Bishop Eustace Prep	Philadelphia, PA
G/F	34	Tasha Vipond	6 ft 2 in (1.88 m)	Fr	Ankeny Centennial	Ankeny, IA
C	42	Ellen Graham	6 ft 2 in (1.88 m)	Jr	Lincoln-Way North	Frankford, IL
F	43	Ashley Lutz	6 ft 1 in (1.85 m)	Sr	Lincoln Sudbury	Sudbury, MA

Head coach

- Theresa Grentz (Immaculata)

Assistant coach(es)

- C.K. Calhoun (Marymount)
- Ross James (Millsaps)
- Kristen Foley (Rutgers)

Legend

- (C) Team captain
- (S) Suspended
- (I) Ineligible
- (W) Walk-on
- Injured
- Current redshirt

Roster

== Schedule ==
Date time, TV	Rank^{#}	Opponent^{#}	Result	Record	Site (attendance) city, state
Non-conference regular season
11/11/2016*; 7:00 pm		at La Salle	W 56–49	1–0	Tom Gola Arena (310); Philadelphia, PA
11/14/2016*; 7:00 pm		at Rider	L 58–76	1–1	Alumni Gymnasium (304); Lawrenceville, NJ
11/16/2016*; 7:00 pm		Robert Morris	L 51–62	1–2	Kirby Sports Center (429); Eaton, PA
11/19/2016*; 2:00 pm		vs. Chattanooga; Hall of Fame Women's Challenge	L 43–68	1–3	KFC Yum! Center; Louisville, KY
11/20/2016*; 4:30 pm		at No. 5 Louisville; Hall of Fame Women's Challenge	L 48–92	1–4	KFC Yum! Center (7,668); Louisville, KY
11/21/2016*; 5:00 pm		vs. Bowling Green; Hall of Fame Women's Challenge	L 42–69	1–5	KFC Yum! Center; Louisville, KY
11/27/2016*; 3:30 pm		vs. Hampton; Hall of Fame Women's Challenge	L 55–58	1–6	MassMutual Center (1,812); Springfield, MA
11/30/2016*; 6:00 pm		Penn	L 47–64	1–7	Kirby Sports Center (274); Eaton, PA
12/03/2016*; 2:00 pm		at St. John's	L 46–64	1–8	Carnesecca Arena (750); Queens, NY
12/07/2016*; 7:00 pm		at Princeton	L 27–69	1–9	Jadwin Gymnasium (641); Princeton, NJ
12/11/2016*; 2:00 pm		at Duquesne	L 52–67	1–10	Palumbo Center (254); Pittsburgh, PA
12/21/2016*; 2:00 pm		Drexel	L 39–81	1–11	Kirby Sports Center (437); Eaton, PA
Patriot League regular season
12/30/2016; 7:00 pm		at Colgate	L 69–76	1–12 (0–1)	Cotterell Court (441); Hamilton, NY
01/02/2017; 7:00 pm, WBPH		Loyola (MD)	L 55–60	1–13 (0–2)	Kirby Sports Center (424); Eaton, PA
01/05/2017; 7:00 pm		at Army	L 73–76 ^{3OT}	1–14 (0–3)	Christl Arena (557); West Point, NY
01/08/2017; 2:00 pm		at Boston University	L 50–68	1–15 (0–4)	Case Gym (137); Boston, MA
01/11/2017; 7:00 pm, WBPH		Holy Cross	L 61–67	1–16 (0–5)	Kirby Sports Center (347); Eaton, PA
01/14/2017; 7:00 pm		at Navy	L 41–76	1–17 (0–6)	Alumni Hall (622); Annapolis, MD
01/18/2017; 7:00 pm, WBPH		American	L 52–76	1–18 (0–7)	Kirby Sports Center (304); Eaton, PA
01/21/2017; 2:00 pm, WBPH		Lehigh	L 53–56	1–19 (0–8)	Kirby Sports Center (744); Eaton, PA
01/28/2017; 7:00 pm		at Loyola (MD)	L 47–75	1–20 (0–9)	Reitz Arena (1,750); Baltimore, MD
02/01/2017; 7:00 pm, WBPH		Army	L 55–63	1–21 (0–10)	Kirby Sports Center (357); Eaton, PA
02/04/2017; 2:00 pm, WBPH		Boston University	L 58–75	1–22 (0–11)	Kirby Sports Center (347); Eaton, PA
02/08/2017; 7:00 pm		at Holy Cross	W 85–70	2–22 (1–11)	Hart Center (1,151); Worcester, MA
02/11/2017; 2:00 pm, WBPH		Navy	L 65–68	2–23 (1–12)	Kirby Sports Center (572); Eaton, PA
02/15/2017; 7:00 pm		at American	L 45–75	2–24 (1–13)	Bender Arena (342); Washington, D.C.
02/18/2017; 2:00 pm		at Lehigh	L 60–69	2–25 (1–14)	Stabler Arena (827); Bethlehem, PA
02/22/2017; 7:00 pm, WBPH		Bucknell	L 65–79	2–26 (1–15)	Kirby Sports Center (344); Eaton, PA
02/25/2017; 2:00 pm, WBPH		Colgate	W 90–85	3–26 (2–15)	Kirby Sports Center (445); Eaton, PA
03/01/2017; 6:00 pm		at Bucknell	L 61–78	3–27 (2–16)	Sojka Pavilion (532); Lewisburg, PA
Patriot League Women's Tournament
03/04/2017; 1:00 pm	(10)	at (7) Holy Cross; First Round	W 58–54	4–27	Hart Center (250); Worcester, MA
03/04/2017; 1:00 pm	(10)	at (2) Navy; Quarterfinals	L 37–53	4–28	Alumni Hall (587); Annapolis, MD
*Non-conference game. ^{#}Rankings from AP poll. (#) Tournament seedings in parentheses. All times are in Eastern Time.

== See also ==
- 2016–17 Lafayette Leopards men's basketball team
