= 2016–17 Army Black Knights women's basketball team =

Intercollegiate basketball season

2016–17 Army Black Knights women's basketball
- Conference: Patriot League
- Record: 22–9 (12–6 Patriot)
- Head coach: Dave Magarity (11th season)
- Assistant coaches: Colleen Mullen; Lisa Strack; Melissa Brooks; Megan Methven
- Home arena: Christl Arena

2016–17 Patriot League women's basketball standings
	Conf.				Overall
Team	W		L	PCT	W		L	PCT
Bucknell †	16	–	2	.889	27	–	6	.818
Navy	14	–	4	.778	24	–	10	.706
Army	12	–	6	.667	22	–	9	.710
American	11	–	7	.611	15	–	16	.484
Boston University	11	–	7	.611	13	–	17	.433
Colgate	7	–	11	.389	10	–	20	.333
Loyola (MD)	6	–	12	.333	11	–	20	.355
Holy Cross	6	–	12	.333	8	–	21	.276
Lehigh	5	–	13	.278	10	–	20	.333
Lafayette	2	–	16	.111	4	–	28	.125
† 2017 Patriot League tournament winner As of March 4, 2017; Rankings from AP poll

The 2016–17 Army Black Knights men's basketball team represented the United States Military Academy during the 2016–17 NCAA Division I women's basketball season. The Black Knights, led by eleventh year head coach Dave Magarity, played their home games at Christl Arena and were members of the Patriot League. They finished the season 22–9, 12–6 in Patriot League play to finish in third place. They advanced to the semifinals of the Patriot League women's tournament where they lost to Navy. Despite having 22 wins, they missed the postseason tournament for the first time since 2014.

== Roster ==
2016–17 Army Black Knights women's basketball team
Players
Coaches

Pos.	#	Name	Height	Year	Previous school	Hometown
G	1	Cori Schnell	5 ft 8 in (1.73 m)	Fr	Prince of Peace Christian School	Plano, TX
G	3	Jess Lewis	5 ft 9 in (1.75 m)	So	Regis Jesuit	Denver, CO
F	4	Margaret Anne Hubbell	5 ft 9 in (1.75 m)	Jr	Germantown Academy	Doylestown, PA
G	10	Aliyah Murray	5 ft 10 in (1.78 m)	Jr	Delran; USMAPS	Delran, NJ
G	11	Ellen Dougherty	5 ft 6 in (1.68 m)	So	Academy of Law and Public Safety; USMAPS	Wall, NJ
G	12	Izzy McMahon	5 ft 2 in (1.57 m)	So	Saddle River Day School; USMAPS	Bardonia, NY
F/C	13	Lena' Hicks	6 ft 4 in (1.93 m)	Jr	Elkton; USMAPS	Charlotte, NC
F	14	Madison Hovren	5 ft 11 in (1.8 m)	So	Central Valley	Spokane, WA
G	15	Morgann Yancey	5 ft 8 in (1.73 m)	Fr	Plano West	Dallas, TX
G	20	Destinee Morris	5 ft 7 in (1.7 m)	Jr	Centennial	Lino Lakes, MN
G	21	Janae McNeal	5 ft 9 in (1.75 m)	Jr	Courtland; USMAPS	Spotsylvania, VA
G/F	22	Shelby Haynes	5 ft 11 in (1.8 m)	Fr	West Springfield	Brandon, MS
G	23	Daizjah Morris	5 ft 7 in (1.7 m)	Jr	Centennial	Lino Lakes, MN
F	34	Julia Gibbs	5 ft 10 in (1.78 m)	Fr	Mills	Millbrae, CA
F/C	35	Dani Failor	6 ft 1 in (1.85 m)	Sr	Post Falls	Post Falls, ID
F	42	Alex Elzinga	5 ft 11 in (1.8 m)	Sr	Adlai E. Stevenson	Long Grove, IL
G	44	Libby Tacka	5 ft 9 in (1.75 m)	Fr	Mount Saint Joseph Academy	Blue Bell, PA

Head coach

- Dave Magarity (Saint Francis (PA))

Assistant coach(es)

- Colleen Mullen (New Hampshire)
- Lisa Strack (American)
- Jenna McLaughlin (Molloy)

Legend

- (C) Team captain
- (S) Suspended
- (I) Ineligible
- (W) Walk-on
- Injured
- Current redshirt

Roster

== Schedule ==
Date time, TV	Rank^{#}	Opponent^{#}	Result	Record	Site (attendance) city, state
Non-conference regular season
11/12/2016*; 6:00 pm		at LIU Brooklyn	W 68–47	1–0	Steinberg Wellness Center (189); Brooklyn, NY
11/16/2016*; 5:30 pm		at Albany	L 59–65	1–1	SEFCU Arena; Albany, NY
11/18/2016*; 7:00 pm		Yale	W 59–55	2–1	Christl Arena (793); West Point, NY
11/23/2016*; 7:00 pm		Air Force	W 75–47	3–1	Christl Arena (631); West Point, NY
11/26/2016*; 12:00 pm		at Dartmouth	W 68–60	4–1	Leede Arena; Durham, NH
11/28/2016*; 7:00 pm		Fairleigh Dickinson	W 86–58	5–1	Christl Arena (440); West Point, NY
12/03/2016*; 1:00 pm		St. Francis Brooklyn	W 69–46	6–1	Christl Arena (640); West Point, NY
12/05/2016*; 7:00 pm		Wagner	W 85–40	7–1	Christl Arena (467); West Point, NY
12/08/2016*; 9:00 pm, BTN		at Minnesota	L 52–70	7–2	Williams Arena (2,003); Minneapolis, MN
12/11/2016*; 2:00 pm		at Delaware	W 61–47	8–2	Bob Carpenter Center (1,164); Newark, DE
12/17/2016*; 7:00 pm		Mercy	W 90–48	9–2	Christl Arena (643); West Point, NY
Patriot League regular season
12/30/2016; 7:00 pm		at Lehigh	W 75–71	10–2 (1–0)	Stabler Arena (779); Bethlehem, PA
01/02/2017; 7:00 pm		Bucknell	L 56–60	10–3 (1–1)	Christl Arena (506); West Point, NY
01/05/2017; 7:00 pm		Lafayette	W 76–73 ^{3OT}	11–3 (2–1)	Christl Arena (557); West Point, NY
01/08/2017; 2:00 pm		at Loyola (MD)	L 62–71	11–4 (2–2)	Reitz Arena (187); Baltimore, MD
01/11/2017; 12:00 pm		at Colgate	W 76–69	12–4 (3–2)	Cotterell Court (1,534); Hamilton, NY
01/15/2017; 2:00 pm		American	W 53–51	13–4 (4–2)	Christl Arena (680); West Point, NY
01/18/2017; 7:05 pm		at Holy Cross	W 67–59	14–4 (5–2)	Hart Center (911); Worcester, MA
01/21/2017; 11:00 am, CBSSN		Navy	L 58–63	14–5 (5–3)	Christl Arena (5,291); West Point, NY
01/28/2017; 6:00 pm		at Bucknell	L 62–68	14–6 (5–4)	Sojka Pavilion (860); Lewistown, PA
02/01/2017; 7:00 pm		at Lafayette	W 63–55	15–6 (6–4)	Kirby Sports Center (357); Easton, PA
02/04/2017; 1:00 pm		Loyola (MD)	W 67–48	16–6 (7–4)	Christl Arena (770); West Point, NY
02/08/2017; 7:00 pm		Colgate	W 57–47	17–6 (8–4)	Christl Arena (646); West Point, NY
02/11/2017; 2:00 pm		at American	W 68–57	18–6 (9–4)	Bender Arena (1,036); Washington, D.C.
02/15/2017; 7:00 pm		Holy Cross	W 60–41	19–6 (10–4)	Christl Arena (754); West Point, NY
02/18/2017; 11:00 am, CBSSN		at Navy	L 62–67	19–7 (10–5)	Alumni Hall (5,710); Annapolis, MD
02/22/2017; 7:00 pm		at Boston University	W 64–52	20–7 (11–5)	Case Gym (302); Boston, MA
02/25/2016; 7:00 pm		Lehigh	W 70–52	21–7 (12–5)	Christl Arena (1,215); West Point, NY
03/01/2017; 7:00 pm		Boston University	L 62–66	21–8 (13–5)	Christl Arena (572); West Point, NY
Patriot League Women's Tournament
03/06/2017; 7:00 pm	(3)	(6) Colgate; Quarterfinals	W 83–76	22–8	Christl Arena (190); West Point, NY
03/10/2017; 7:30 pm	(3)	vs. (2) Navy; Semifinals	L 53–54	22–9	Sojka Pavilion (1,337); Lewisburg, PA
*Non-conference game. ^{#}Rankings from AP Poll. (#) Tournament seedings in parentheses. All times are in Eastern Time.

== Rankings ==
2016–17 NCAA Division I women's basketball rankings

+ Regular season polls	Poll	Pre- Season	Week 2	Week 3	Week 4	Week 5	Week 6	Week 7	Week 8	Week 9	Week 10	Week 11	Week 12	Week 13	Week 14	Week 15	Week 16	Week 17	Week 18	Week 19	Final
AP																				N/A	
Coaches																					

Legend
	Increase in ranking
	Decrease in ranking
	Not ranked previous week
(RV)	Received Votes

== See also ==
- 2016–17 Army Black Knights men's basketball team
