= Anna Parker Fessenden =

American botanist

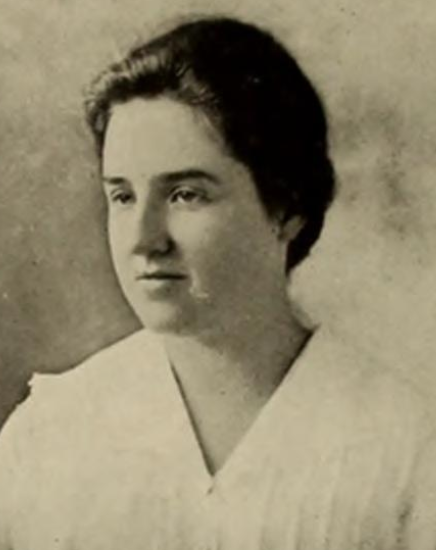
- Anna Parker Fessenden, from the 1918 yearbook of Smith College
- Born: April 8, 1896; Thomaston, Maine, U.S.
- Died: May 3, 1972 (aged 76); Camden, Maine, U.S.
- Occupations: Botanist, math educator

Anna Parker Fessenden (April 8, 1896 – May 3, 1972) was an American botanist and mathematics educator.

== Early life and education ==
Anna Parker Fessenden was born in Thomaston, Maine, and raised in Mattapan, Massachusetts, the middle of three daughters of William S. Fessenden and Alida Mary Mehan Fessenden. Her mother was assistant principal of Sandwich High School.

Fessenden graduated from Girls' Latin School in 1914, and graduated from Smith College in 1918. As a college student, she was active in the Smith College Unitarian Club, and she edited and wrote for the Smith College Monthly. She earned a master's degree from the University of Minnesota in 1920. Her master's thesis, under advisor Josephine Tilden, was titled "Observations on Two Rare Australian Algae, Myriocladia Sciurus, Harvey and Bactrophora Irregularis, N. SP."

== Career ==
Fessenden taught botany at Vassar College, Wellesley College and at the University of Minnesota. She and Josephine Tilden co-authored a 22-page article on brown algae from Australia. She taught mathematics at Needham High School in Massachusetts for 36 years, and was a director of math programs for the Needham school district. She retired from teaching in 1962.

Fessenden was an active member of several clubs including the Audubon Society, and a trustee of the Thomaston Historical Society.

The standard author abbreviation Fess. is used to indicate this person as the author when citing a botanical name.

== Personal life ==
Fessenden died in 1972, aged 76 years, in Camden, Maine. Her grave is with her parents' graves, in Sandwich, Massachusetts.
