= 2016–17 Bucknell Bison women's basketball team =

Intercollegiate basketball season

2016–17 Bucknell Bison women's basketball

Patriot League Regular Season and Tournament Champions

NCAA Women's Tournament, first round
- Conference: Patriot League
- Record: 27–6 (16–2 Patriot)
- Head coach: Aaron Roussell (5th season)
- Assistant coaches: Mike Lane; Carissa Nord; Martina Wood
- Home arena: Sojka Pavilion

2016–17 Patriot League women's basketball standings
	Conf.				Overall
Team	W		L	PCT	W		L	PCT
Bucknell †	16	–	2	.889	27	–	6	.818
Navy	14	–	4	.778	24	–	10	.706
Army	12	–	6	.667	22	–	9	.710
American	11	–	7	.611	15	–	16	.484
Boston University	11	–	7	.611	13	–	17	.433
Colgate	7	–	11	.389	10	–	20	.333
Loyola (MD)	6	–	12	.333	11	–	20	.355
Holy Cross	6	–	12	.333	8	–	21	.276
Lehigh	5	–	13	.278	10	–	20	.333
Lafayette	2	–	16	.111	4	–	28	.125
† 2017 Patriot League tournament winner As of March 4, 2017; Rankings from AP poll

The 2016–17 Bucknell Bison women's basketball team represented Bucknell University during the 2016–17 NCAA Division I women's basketball season. The Bison, led by sixth year head coach Aaron Roussell, played their home games at Sojka Pavilion and were members of the Patriot League. They finished the season 27–6, 16–2 in Patriot League play win Patriot League regular season title. They won the Patriot League women's tournament to earn an automatic trip to the NCAA women's tournament for the first time since 2008, where they lost to Maryland in the first round.

== Roster ==
2016–17 Bucknell Bison women's basketball team
Players
Coaches

Pos.	#	Name	Height	Year	Previous school	Hometown
G	2	Kyi English	5 ft 5 in (1.65 m)	So	East Orange	East Orange, NJ
G	4	Gia Hayes	5 ft 8 in (1.73 m)	Fr	eStem High Public Charter School	Maumelle, AR
G	11	Megan McGurk	5 ft 7 in (1.7 m)	Sr	Academy of Notre Dame	West Chester, PA
F	12	Claire DeBoer	6 ft 1 in (1.85 m)	Sr	Grosse Point South	Grosse Pointe, MI
G	13	Rachael Dumiak	5 ft 11 in (1.8 m)	So	La Costa Canyon	Carlsbad, CA
G	20	Kate Walker	6 ft 0 in (1.83 m)	So	Red Oak Community	Red Oak, IA
F	22	Maegan Mikkelsen	6 ft 3 in (1.91 m)	So	Woodbridge	Woodbridge, VA
F	32	Catherine Romaine	6 ft 2 in (1.88 m)	Jr	Chapel Hill	Chapel Hill, NC
G	33	Carly Richardson	5 ft 11 in (1.8 m)	So	Palmyra	Palmyra, PA
G	34	Sheaira Jones	5 ft 9 in (1.75 m)	Sr	Colerain	Cincinnati, OH
G	40	Ellie Mack	6 ft 2 in (1.88 m)	Fr	Conestoga	Paoli, PA
F	41	Sune Swart	6 ft 3 in (1.91 m)	Sr	Cranberry	Cincinnati, OH
F	50	Kaitlyn Slagus	6 ft 2 in (1.88 m)	So	Belle Vernon	Belle Vernon, PA
F	54	MK Moore	6 ft 5 in (1.96 m)	Fr	St. Thomas Aquinas	Fort Lauderdale, FL

Head coach

- Aaron Roussell (Iowa)

Assistant coach(es)

- Mike Lane (Notre Dame)
- Carissa Nord (South Dakota State)
- Martina Wood (North Carolina)

Legend

- (C) Team captain
- (S) Suspended
- (I) Ineligible
- (W) Walk-on
- Injured
- Current redshirt

Roster

== Schedule ==
Date time, TV	Rank^{#}	Opponent^{#}	Result	Record	Site (attendance) city, state
Non-conference regular season
11/11/2016*; 5:30 pm, ESPN3		at Binghamton	W 67–57	1–0	Binghamton University Events Center (3,278); Vestal, NY
11/13/2016*; 2:00 pm		at Saint Joseph's	W 64–61	2–0	Hagan Arena (743); Philadelphia, PA
11/17/2016*; 6:00 pm		NJIT	W 67–36	3–0	Sojka Pavilion (445); Lewisburg, PA
11/20/2016*; 6:00 pm, ACCN Extra		at North Carolina	L 50–65	3–1	Carmichael Arena (2,498); Chapel Hill, NC
11/22/2016*; 7:00 pm		at Elon	L 58–64	3–2	Alumni Gym (533); Elon, NC
11/27/2016*; 7:00 pm		Drexel	W 78–66	4–2	Sojka Pavilion (454); Lewisburg, PA
11/30/2016*; 10:30 am		at Akron	W 61–47	5–2	James A. Rhodes Arena (1,449); Akron, OH
12/03/2016*; 2:00 pm		at Rutgers	L 53–57	5–3	Louis Brown Athletic Center (1,674); Piscataway, NJ
12/06/2016*; 7:00 pm		at St. Bonaventure	W 57–35	6–3	Reilly Center (587); Olean, NY
12/18/2016*; 2:00 pm		Cleveland State	W 77–66	7–3	Sojka Pavilion (382); Lewisburg, PA
12/20/2016*; 6:00 pm		Manhattan	W 69–64	8–3	Sojka Pavilion (376); Lewisburg, PA
Patriot League regular season
12/30/2016; 6:00 pm		Navy	W 67–64	9–3 (1–0)	Sojka Pavilion (597); Lewisburg, PA
01/02/2017; 7:00 pm		at Army	W 60–56	10–3 (2–0)	Christl Arena (506); West Point, NY
01/05/2017; 11:00 am		American	W 73–67 ^{OT}	11–3 (3–0)	Sojka Pavilion (814); Lewisburg, PA
01/08/2017; 2:00 pm		Holy Cross	W 77–48	12–3 (4–0)	Sojka Pavilion (451); Lewisburg, PA
01/11/2017; 7:00 pm		at Lehigh	W 77–58	13–3 (5–0)	Stabler Arena (592); Bethlehem, PA
01/14/2017; 2:00 pm		Colgate	W 79–56	14–3 (6–0)	Sojka Pavilion (695); Lewisburg, PA
01/18/2017; 7:00 pm		at Loyola (MD)	W 72–66	15–3 (7–0)	Reitz Arena (237); Baltimore, MD
01/21/2017; 2:00 pm		at Boston University	W 66–50	16–3 (8–0)	Case Gym (186); Boston, MA
01/28/2017; 6:00 pm		Army	W 68–62	17–3 (9–0)	Sojka Pavilion (860); Lewisburg, PA
02/01/2017; 7:00 pm		at American	L 47–59	17–4 (9–1)	Bender Arena (339); Washington, D.C.
02/04/2017; 12:00 pm, ASN		at Holy Cross	L 51–63	17–5 (9–2)	Hart Center (1,012); Worcester, MA
02/08/2017; 6:00 pm		Lehigh	W 73–54	18–5 (10–2)	Sojka Pavilion (469); Lewisburg, PA
02/11/2017; 2:00 pm		at Colgate	W 79–49	19–5 (11–2)	Cotterell Court (883); Hamilton, NY
02/15/2017; 6:00 pm		Loyola (MD)	W 57–39	20–5 (12–2)	Sojka Pavilion (674); Lewisburg, PA
02/18/2017; 2:00 pm		Boston University	W 73–56	21–5 (13–2)	Sojka Pavilion (736); Lewisburg, PA
02/22/2017; 7:00 pm		at Lafayette	W 79–65	22–5 (14–2)	Kirby Sports Center (344); Easton, PA
02/25/2017; 7:00 pm		at Navy	W 63–54	23–5 (15–2)	Alumni Hall (1,086); Annapolis, MD
03/01/2017; 6:00 pm		Lafayette	W 78–61	24–5 (16–2)	Sojka Pavilion (532); Lewisburg, PA
Patriot League Women's Tournament
03/06/2017; 6:00 pm	(1)	(8) Loyola (MD); Quarterfinals	W 75–72	25–5	Sojka Pavilion (546); Lewisburg, PA
03/10/2017; 5:00 pm	(1)	(4) American; Semifinals	W 69–57	26–5	Sojka Pavilion (1,337); Lewisburg, PA
03/12/2017; 11:00 am, CBSSN	(1)	(2) Navy; Championship Game	W 79–71 ^{OT}	27–5	Sojka Pavilion (1,231); Lewisburg, PA
NCAA Women's Tournament
03/17/2017*; 12:00 pm, ESPN2	(14 B)	at (3 B) No. 4 Maryland; First Round	L 61–103	27–6	Xfinity Center (3,511); College Park, MD
*Non-conference game. ^{#}Rankings from AP Poll. (#) Tournament seedings in parentheses. B=Bridgeport Region. All times are in Eastern Time.

== See also ==
- 2016–17 Bucknell Bison men's basketball team
