= David B. Wexler =

Legal academic

David B. Wexler is a Professor of Law at the University of Puerto Rico in San Juan, Puerto Rico, a Distinguished Research Professor of Law Emeritus at the James E. Rogers College of Law, Tucson, Arizona, and an Honorary President of the International Society for Therapeutic Jurisprudence.

Wexler is credited with first discussing the therapeutic jurisprudence perspective in 1987, and along with Bruce Winick is recognized as one of the two "leading scholars in this field." He is a consultant on therapeutic jurisprudence to the National Judicial Institute of Canada, and has served as a Fulbright Senior Specialist. One author characterizes Wexler's jurisprudence as radical centrist in orientation. Constance Backhouse, a leading legal historian from Canada, has published a biography of Wexler and his work. In 2020, for his work in therapeutic jurisprudence, Wexler was awarded the Albert Nelson Marquis Lifetime Achievement Award.

== Published works ==
- Rehabilitating Lawyers: Principles of Therapeutic Jurisprudence for Criminal Law Practice (Carolina Academic Press 2008)
- Judging in a Therapeutic Key: Therapeutic Jurisprudence and the Courts (with Bruce Winick) (Carolina Academic Press 2003)
- Practicing Therapeutic Jurisprudence: Law as a Helping Profession (with Dennis P. Stolle and Bruce Winick) (Carolina Academic Press 2000)
- Law in a Therapeutic Key: Developments in Therapeutic Jurisprudence (with Bruce Winick) (Carolina Academic Press 1996)
- Essays in Therapeutic Jurisprudence (with Bruce Winick) (Carolina Academic Press 1991)
- Therapeutic Jurisprudence: The Law as a Therapeutic Agent (Carolina Academic Press 1990)
- Mental Health Law: Major Issues (Plenum Press 1981).

== Achievements and recognitions ==
- Manfred S. Guttmacher Forensic Psychiatry Award, American Psychiatric Association;
- American Bar Association's Commission on Mental Disability and the Law, chair;
- Association of American Law Schools Section on Law and Mental Disability, chair;
- Advisory Board of the National Center for State Courts' Institute on Mental Disability and Law, chair;
- Panel on Legal Issues of the President's Commission on Mental Health, member;
- National Commission on the Insanity Defense, member;
- International Academy of Law and Mental Health, Vice President;
- New York University School of Law Distinguished Alumnus Legal Scholarship/Teaching Award;
- Distinguished Service Award from the National Center for State Courts;
- MacArthur Foundation Research Network on Mental Health and the Law, member;
- Honorary Distinguished Member of the American Psychology-Law Society.
- Honorary President, Iberoamerican Association of Therapeutic Jurisprudence.
- Honorary President, International Society for Therapeutic Jurisprudence
- Recipient, Albert Nelson Marquis Lifetime Achievement Award by Marquis Who's Who, 2020
- Distinguished Professor Emeritus in Law at the University of Arizona in 2005
- Distinguished Professor Emeritus in Law at the University of Puerto Rico in 2026
