= Arthur J. England Jr. =

American judge (1932–2013)

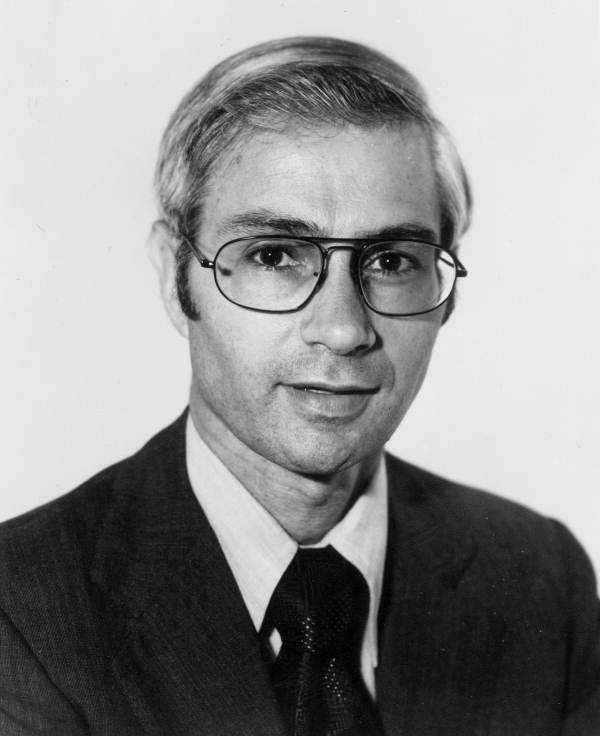
- England in 1975

Chief Justice of the Florida Supreme Court
- In office 1978–1980

Justice of the Florida Supreme Court
- In office 1975–1981

Personal details
- Born: December 23, 1932 Dayton, Ohio, U.S.
- Died: August 1, 2013 (aged 80) Coral Gables, Florida, U.S.

Arthur Jay England Jr. (December 23, 1932 – August 1, 2013) was an American jurist and lawyer who served as a justice of the Florida Supreme Court.

Born in Dayton, Ohio, England served in the United States Army in counter-intelligence. He then received his Bachelor of Science in Economics degree from the Wharton School of the University of Pennsylvania and Juris Doctors degree University of Pennsylvania School of Law, and LLM degree from the University of Miami School of Law. He then practiced law in Florida. He served on the Florida Supreme Court from 1975 to 1981 and was the chief justice of the court from 1978 to 1980.

He died at his home in Coral Gables, Florida, from pulmonary fibrosis.

== See also ==
- List of Jewish American jurists
