= Needham High School =

High school in Needham, Massachusetts

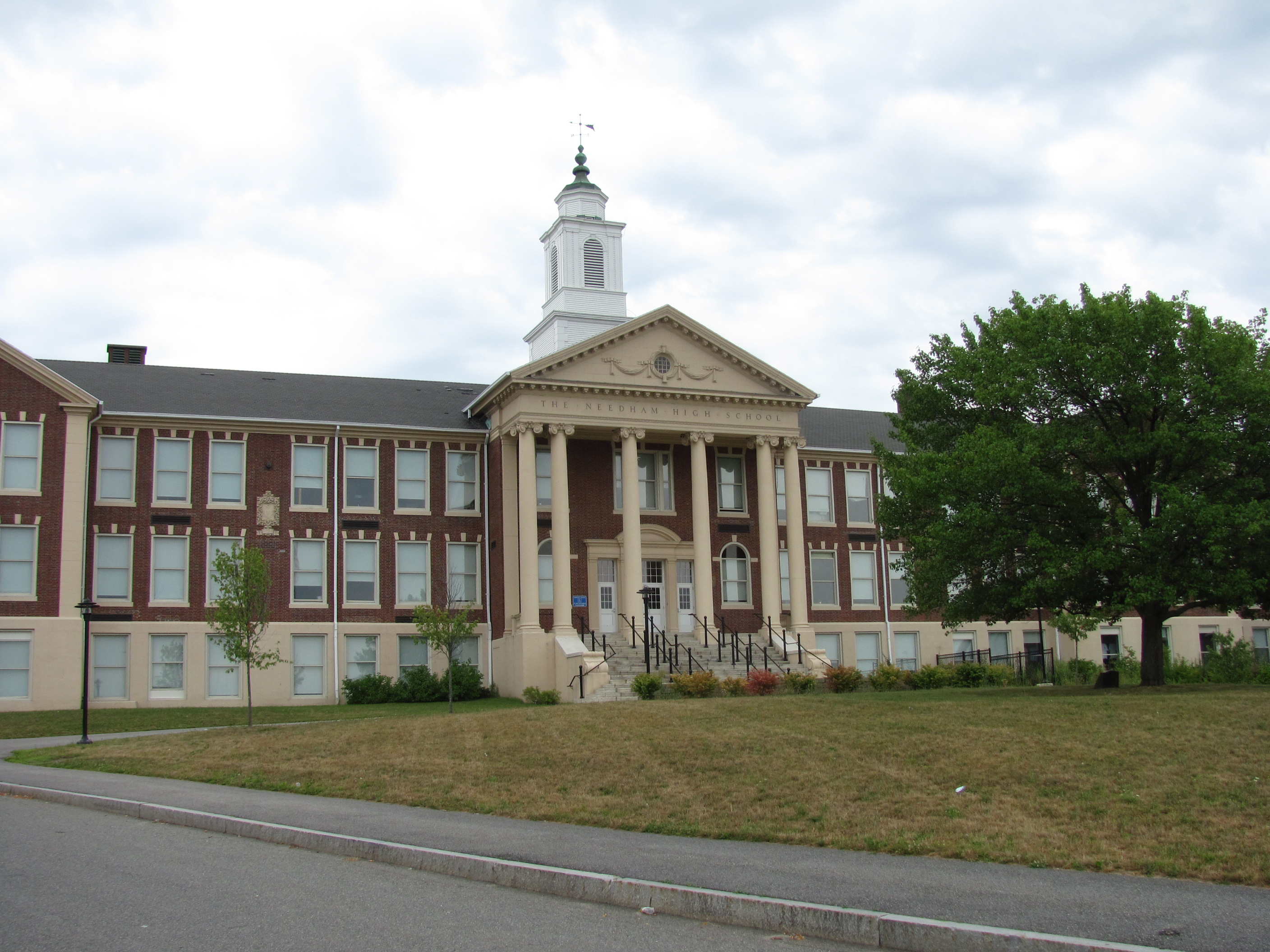

Location
- 609 Webster Street, Needham, Massachusetts; United States; 42°17′14″N 71°13′51″W

Information
- Type: Public secondary
- Established: 1898
- Principal: Aaron Sicotte
- Teaching staff: 137.43 (FTE)
- Grades: 9–12
- Enrollment: 1,633 (2024–2025)
- Student to teacher ratio: 11.88
- Colors: Blue and Gold
- Athletics conference: Bay State Conference
- Nickname: Rockets
- Rivals: Wellesley High School (Wellesley, MA)
- Newspaper: The Hilltopper
- Yearbook: The Advocate
- Website: Needham High School

Needham High School is a public high school in Needham, Massachusetts, educating grades 9 through 12. It currently has 1,622 students enrolled as of 2024 and over 200 instructional staff members. It offers a wide variety of courses including many AP classes. It consistently rates as a top public high school in Massachusetts, currently being rated #19 according to niche.com

The current principal is Aaron Sicotte as of 2025.

== Notable alumni and teachers ==
- Charlie Baker, 72nd Governor of Massachusetts
- Marsha Bemko, executive producer of Antiques Roadshow.
- Peter DeFazio, U.S. Representative, 4th Congressional District of Oregon (Class of 1965)
- Anna Parker Fessenden, botanist, taught math at Needham High School
- Jared Freid, comedian and podcaster
- Robbie Ftorek, NHL coach and player, born and raised in Needham (Class of 1970)
- James S. Gracey, former Commandant of the United States Coast Guard
- Steven Hauschka, American football player
- Eric Johnson, American football player
- Richard Larson, professor at the Massachusetts Institute of Technology
- Phil Murphy, 56th Governor of New Jersey.
- Marissa Nadler, singer-songwriter
- Aly Raisman, Olympic gold medalist for gymnastics in London 2012 and Rio 2016
- Karl Ravech, ESPN Baseball Tonight anchor, born and raised in Needham
- Sarah Saltzberg, actress/singer
- Harry Swartz (born 1996), soccer player
- Mike Tannenbaum, American football executive
- Jeff Taylor, founder of Monster.com
- Sunita Williams, NASA astronaut
- Stephanie Rhoades, District Court Judge
