= Therapeutic jurisprudence =

Approach to law prioritizing psychological impacts

Therapeutic jurisprudence (TJ) is an interdisciplinary approach to legal scholarship with the goal of reforming the law so it has a positive impact on the well-being of defendants appearing in court. TJ researchers and practitioners typically make use of social science methods to explore ways in which negative consequences can be reduced, and therapeutic consequences enhanced, without breaching due process requirements. By taking a non-adversarial approach to the administration of justice, judges and lawyers work together to create strategies that help offenders make positive changes in their own lives. Therapeutic jurisprudence has been used successfully in mental health courts and other problem-solving courts, such as drug courts for defendants with addictions.

== Early development ==
The term was first used by Professor David Wexler, of the University of Arizona Rogers College of Law and University of Puerto Rico School of Law, in a paper delivered to the National Institute of Mental Health in 1987. Constance Backhouse, a leading legal historian from Canada, has published a biography of Wexler and his work. Along with Professor Bruce Winick of the University of Miami School of Law, who developed the area with Wexler, these law professors suggested the need for a new perspective, TJ, to study the extent to which substantive rules, legal procedures, and the role of legal actors (primarily lawyers and judges) produce therapeutic or antitherapeutic consequences for individuals involved in the legal process. In the early 1990s, legal scholars began to use the term when discussing mental health law, including Wexler in his 1990 book Therapeutic Jurisprudence: The Law as a Therapeutic Agent, and Wexler and Winick in their 1991 book, Essays in Therapeutic Jurisprudence. The TJ Approach soon spread beyond mental health law to include TJ work in criminal law, family and juvenile law, health law, tort law, contracts and commercial law, trusts and estates law, disability law, constitutional law, evidence law, and legal profession. In short, TJ became a mental health approach to law generally.

The approach was soon applied to the way various legal actors—judges, lawyers, police officers, and psychologists and criminal justice professionals—play their roles, suggesting ways of doing so that would diminish unintended antitherapeutic consequences and increase the psychological well-being of those who come into contact with these legal figures. In 1999 in a Notre Dame Law Review article TJ was applied to drug treatment courts (DTC) for the first time and the authors asserted that DTCs were TJ in action and that TJ provided the jurisprudential underpinnings of DTCs. TJ has emerged as the theoretical foundation for the increasing number of "problem-solving courts" that have transformed the role of the judiciary. These include, in addition to DTCs, domestic violence courts, mental health courts, re-entry courts, teen courts, and community courts.

Some countries embraced the TJ movement more than others: particularly the United States where it originated, as well as Canada, Australia and New Zealand, with England slower until recently, while nevertheless developing some problem-solving courts. More recently, TJ concepts have entered into the systems of various other countries, such as Israel, Pakistan, India, and Japan. Reflecting its wide adoption, the International Society for Therapeutic Jurisprudence, a society with a comprehensive and authoritative website, was launched.

== Reframing roles ==
Therapeutic Jurisprudence also has been applied in an effort to reframe the role of the lawyer. It envisions lawyers practicing with an ethic of care and heightened interpersonal skills, who value the psychological well being of their clients as well as their legal rights and interests, and to actively seek to prevent legal problems through creative drafting and problem-solving approaches. TJ also has begun to transform legal education, in particular clinical legal education.

== Mainstreaming ==
Traditionally, TJ was closely associated with problem-solving courts, such as drug treatment courts, because such courts were designed to invite the use of TJ practices (such as procedural justice, judge-client personal interaction, demonstration of empathy, active listening, and the like). Many desire the expansion of problem-solving courts, but for a number of reasons, especially economic ones, expansion on a large scale seems unlikely; in fact, in some jurisdictions, economic factors have even led to the elimination of such courts. For these and other reasons, a current interest on the part of many TJ scholars and proponents is to "mainstream" TJ—that is, to try to apply TJ practices and principles in "ordinary" courts, especially in criminal, juvenile, and perhaps family matters.

In order to mainstream TJ, a first analytical step is to see to what extent existing provisions of current codes are "friendly"to TJ—that is, whether their legal structure is sufficient to permit the introduction of TJ practices. If so, educational programs should be instituted to discuss how the law may be implemented in a more therapeutic manner. If not, a discussion would be necessary about the desirability and feasibility of legal reform. The analytical methodology in use here employs the metaphor of "wine" and "bottles", where the TJ practices and techniques are the wine and the governing legal structures are the bottles. The mainstreaming project is facilitated by a Blog entitled Therapeutic Jurisprudence in the Mainstream.

== Related concepts ==
Therapeutic jurisprudence has been described as a subset of legal psychology, meaning the scientific study of mind and behavior as it affects or is affected by the law. As well, the term psychological jurisprudence has been used to describe study of the law as it is affected by and affects mind and behavior. Another related concept is restorative justice. The fields of forensic psychology and forensic psychiatry also operate at the juncture of law and the mind.

The idea that the law can have a therapeutic role should not be confused with any idea that psychological therapies should be attempted to be used for legal ends (such as coercion) rather than clinically for clinical reasons. TJ theorists have also warned against the legal system uncritically accepting psychological experts and theories, and to not allow legal issues to masquerade as clinical ones if they are not.

Coming from the opposite direction, a related approach now dubbed 'jurisprudent psychology' (originally therapy) looks at whether psychological interventions are conducted fairly and consistently with legal concepts of justice.

Therapeutic jurisprudence is also linked to the positive criminology perspective, which is a conceptual approach to criminology that places an emphasis on social inclusion and on forces at individual, group, social and spiritual levels that are associated with the limiting of crime.

The term therapeutic state has a similar meaning, albeit with more negative connotations. It has mainly been used by writers like Thomas Szasz who criticize the use of psychiatric language in politics and law enforcement.
