= 2016–17 Binghamton Bearcats women's basketball team =

American college basketball season

2016–17 Binghamton Bearcats women's basketball
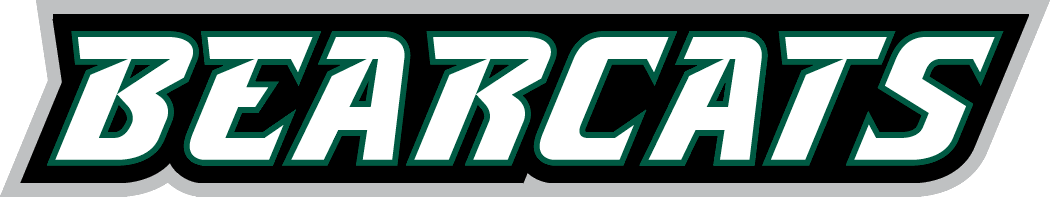
- Conference: America East Conference
- Record: 13–17 (8–8 America East)
- Head coach: Linda Cimino (3rd season)
- Assistant coaches: Torey Northup-Jones; Leah Truncale; Kirsty Leedham
- Home arena: Binghamton University Events Center

2016–17 America East Conference women's basketball standings
	Conf.				Overall
Team	W		L	PCT	W		L	PCT
New Hampshire	15	–	1	.938	26	–	6	.813
Albany †	12	–	4	.750	21	–	12	.636
UMBC	10	–	6	.625	15	–	16	.484
Maine	9	–	7	.563	18	–	16	.529
Binghamton	8	–	8	.500	13	–	17	.433
Hartford	7	–	9	.438	17	–	14	.548
Vermont	6	–	10	.375	9	–	20	.310
Stony Brook	5	–	11	.313	12	–	18	.400
UMass Lowell*	0	–	16	.000	3	–	26	.103
† 2017 America East tournament winner As of March 18, 2017 *ineligible for postseason play due to Div. I transitions Rankings from AP poll

The 2016–17 Binghamton Bearcats women's basketball team represented Binghamton University during the 2016–17 NCAA Division I women's basketball season. The Bearcats, led by third year head coach Linda Cimino, played their home games at Binghamton University Events Center, they were members of the America East Conference. They finished the season 14–17, 8–8 in America East play to finish in fifth place. They lost in the quarterfinals of the America East women's tournament to Hartford.

== Media ==
All home games and conference road games will stream on either ESPN3 or AmericaEast.tv. Most road games will stream on the opponents website. All games will be broadcast on the radio on WNBF and streamed online.

== Roster ==
2016–17 Binghamton Bearcats women's basketball team
Players
Coaches

Pos.	#	Name	Height	Year	Previous school	Hometown
G	3	Kai Moon	5 ft 6 in (1.68 m)	Fr	Nequa Valley	Bolingbrook, IL
F	5	Alyssa James	6 ft 1 in (1.85 m)	RS Jr	St. Mary's; Caldwell	Rosedale, NY
G	10	Jasmine Sina	5 ft 5 in (1.65 m)	RS So	Gill-St. Bernards	Lake Hoptacong, NJ
G	11	Imani Watkins	5 ft 8 in (1.73 m)	Jr	Wingate Andrews	High Point, NC
G	12	Tess Wicks	5 ft 11 in (1.8 m)	Sr	Horseheads	Horseheads, NY
F	13	Kennedi Thompson	6 ft 0 in (1.83 m)	So	Gloucester Catholic	Mullica Hill, NJ
C	14	Payton Husson	6 ft 4 in (1.93 m)	Fr	Marysville	Marysville, MI
F	21	Karlee Krchnavi	6 ft 0 in (1.83 m)	Fr	Palisades	Quakertown, PA
G	23	Bailey Williams	5 ft 10 in (1.78 m)	Fr	Dublin Jerome	Dublin, OH
F	24	Kristin Ross	6 ft 0 in (1.83 m)	Sr	Gorham	Gorham, ME
F	31	Corrinne Godshall	5 ft 11 in (1.8 m)	So	Central Bucks West	Doylestown, PA
G	32	Carly Boland	6 ft 0 in (1.83 m)	Fr	Shenendehowa	Clifton Park, NY
G	33	Rebecca Carmody	5 ft 8 in (1.73 m)	So	Western Wayne	Waymart, PA
F	34	Kylie Libby	6 ft 0 in (1.83 m)	Sr	Cheverus	South Portland, ME

Head coach

- Linda Cimino (Adelphi)

Assistant coach(es)

- Torey Northup-Jones (Caldwell)
- Leah Truncale (Binghamton)
- Kirsty Leedham (Caldwell)

Legend

- (C) Team captain
- (S) Suspended
- (I) Ineligible
- (W) Walk-on
- Injured
- Current redshirt

Roster

== Schedule ==
Date time, TV	Rank^{#}	Opponent^{#}	Result	Record	Site (attendance) city, state
Exhibition
10/30/2016*; 2:00 pm		Rochester	W 53–47		Binghamton University Events Center; Vestal, NY
11/04/2016*; 7:00 pm		Saint Rose	W 60–49		Binghamton University Events Center; Vestal, NY
Non-conference regular season
11/11/2016*; 7:00 pm, ESPN3		Bucknell	L 47–57	0–1	Binghamton University Events Center (3,278); Vestal, NY
11/13/2016*; 2:00 pm		at Yale	L 48–57	0–2	John J. Lee Amphitheater; New Haven, CT
11/16/2016*; 7:00 pm		at Penn	W 61–48	1–2	Palestra (378); Philadelphia, PA
11/19/2016*; 4:00 pm		at Providence	L 58–71	1–3	Alumni Hall (634); Providence, RI
11/23/2016*; 2:00 pm, ESPN3		Sacred Heart	L 69–77	1–4	Binghamton University Events Center (1,160); Vestal, NY
11/27/2016*; 1:00 pm, ESPN3		Brown	L 72–83	1–5	Binghamton University Events Center (1,407); Vestal, NY
12/02/2016*; 7:00 pm		at Fairleigh Dickinson	W 80–69	2–5	Rothman Center (312); Teaneck, NJ
12/06/2016*; 7:00 pm, ESPN3		at NJIT	W 68–44	3–5	Fleisher Center; Newark, NJ
12/10/2016*; 12:00 pm, ESPN3		Columbia	L 65–75	3–6	Binghamton University Events Center; Vestal, NY
12/17/2016*; 4:00 pm, ESPN3		Misericordia	W 77–54	4–6	Binghamton University Events Center (2,002); Vestal, NY
12/19/2016*; 7:00 pm		at Ohio	L 55–63	4–7	Conovcation Center; Athens, OH
12/30/2016*; 2:00 pm, ESPN3		Georgian Court	W 74–53	5–7	Binghamton University Events Center (2,440); Vestal, NY
01/01/2017*; 2:00 pm, ESPN3		Cornell	L 51–54	5–8	Binghamton University Events Center (1,339); Vestal, NY
American East regular season
01/04/2017; 7:00 pm, ESPN3		UMBC	W 69–62	6–8 (1–0)	Binghamton University Events Center (1,225); Vestal, NY
01/07/2017; 2:00 pm, ESPN3		at UMass Lowell	W 58–48	7–8 (2–0)	Costello Athletic Center (207); Lowell, MA
01/11/2017; 7:00 pm, AETV		at Vermont	W 64–55	8–8 (3–0)	Patrick Gym (345); Burlington, VT
01/14/2017; 4:00 pm, ESPN3		New Hampshire	L 62–70	8–9 (3–1)	Binghamton University Events Center (1,590); Vestal, NY
01/19/2017; 7:00 pm, ESPN3		Albany	L 61–67	8–10 (3–2)	Binghamton University Events Center (1,435); Vestal, NY
01/22/2017; 2:00 pm, ESPN3		at Stony Brook	W 48–40	9–10 (4–2)	Island Federal Credit Union Arena (1,142); Stony Brook, NY
01/25/2017; 7:00 pm, AETV		at Hartford	L 73–76 ^{2OT}	9–11 (4–3)	Chase Arena at Reich Family Pavilion (1,011); Hartford, CT
01/28/2017; 7:00 pm, ESPN3		Maine	W 58–52	10–11 (5–3)	Binghamton University Events Center (1,355); Vestal, NY
02/01/2017; 7:00 pm, ESPN3		at UMBC	L 45–53	10–12 (6–3)	Retriever Activities Center (342); Catonsville, MD
02/04/2017; 4:00 pm, ESPN3		UMass Lowell	W 69–54	11–12 (6–4)	Binghamton University Events Center (1,609); Vestal, NY
02/06/2017; 7:00 pm, ESPN3		Vermont	W 76–61	12–12 (7–4)	Binghamton University Events Center; Vestal, NY
02/09/2017; 7:00 pm, ESPN3		at Albany	L 63–80	12–13 (7–5)	SEFCU Arena (1,271); Albany, NY
02/12/2017; 1:00 pm, ESPN3		at New Hampshire	L 69–76	12–14 (7–6)	Lundholm Gym (723); Durham, NH
02/18/2017; 4:00 pm, ESPN3		Stony Brook	L 59–74	12–15 (7–7)	Binghamton University Events Center (1,477); Vestal, NY
02/23/2017; 7:00 pm, ESPN3		Hartford	W 60–59	13–15 (8–7)	Binghamton University Events Center (1,470); Vestal, NY
02/26/2017; 1:00 pm, ESPN3		at Maine	L 48–62	13–16 (8–8)	Cross Insurance Center (2,372); Bangor, ME
America East Women's Tournament
03/04/2017; 2:30 pm, ESPN3		vs. Maine; Quarterfinals	L 40–57	13–17	Cross Insurance Arena; Portland, ME
*Non-conference game. ^{#}Rankings from AP Poll. (#) Tournament seedings in parentheses. All times are in Eastern Time.

== See also ==
- 2016–17 Binghamton Bearcats men's basketball team
