= 2016–17 Vermont Catamounts women's basketball team =

Intercollegiate basketball season

2016–17 Vermont Catamounts women's basketball
- Conference: America East Conference
- Record: 9–20 (6–10 America East)
- Head coach: Chris Day (1st season)
- Assistant coaches: Alisa Kresge; Brian Donoghue; Caroline Coyer
- Home arena: Patrick Gym

2016–17 America East Conference women's basketball standings
	Conf.				Overall
Team	W		L	PCT	W		L	PCT
New Hampshire	15	–	1	.938	26	–	6	.813
Albany †	12	–	4	.750	21	–	12	.636
UMBC	10	–	6	.625	15	–	16	.484
Maine	9	–	7	.563	18	–	16	.529
Binghamton	8	–	8	.500	13	–	17	.433
Hartford	7	–	9	.438	17	–	14	.548
Vermont	6	–	10	.375	9	–	20	.310
Stony Brook	5	–	11	.313	12	–	18	.400
UMass Lowell*	0	–	16	.000	3	–	26	.103
† 2017 America East tournament winner As of March 18, 2017 *ineligible for postseason play due to Div. I transitions Rankings from AP poll

The 2016–17 Vermont Catamounts women's basketball team represented the University of Vermont during the 2016–17 NCAA Division I women's basketball season. The Catamounts, led by first year head coach Chris Day, played their home games in the Patrick Gym and were members of the America East Conference.

== Media ==
All non-televised home games and conference road games will stream on either ESPN3 or AmericaEast.tv. Select home games will be televised by the Northeast Sports Network. Most road games will stream on the opponents website. All games will be broadcast on WVMT 620 AM and streamed online through SportsJuice.com with Rob Ryan calling the action.

== Roster ==
2016–17 Vermont Catamounts women's basketball team
Players
Coaches

Pos.	#	Name	Height	Year	Previous school	Hometown
G	1	Kylie Butler	5 ft 8 in (1.73 m)	Sr	Desert Vista	Phoenix, AZ
G	2	Jessica Fuller	5 ft 6 in (1.68 m)	Fr	Forest Hills Central	Grand Rapids, MI
G	3	Sydney Smith (C)	5 ft 11 in (1.8 m)	Jr	Vernon Hills	Vernon Hills, IL
G	4	Hayley Robertson	5 ft 8 in (1.73 m)	So	Bill Crothers Secondary	Toronto, ON
F	10	Hanna Crymble	6 ft 3 in (1.91 m)	Fr	Champlin Park	Champlin, MN
F	11	Candice Wright	6 ft 3 in (1.91 m)	So	Jacob Hespeler	Cambridge, ON
G	12	Katie Lavelle (C)	5 ft 9 in (1.75 m)	Jr	Long Island Lutheran	Hicksville, NY
G	13	Kristina White	5 ft 8 in (1.73 m)	RS Jr	Woodbury	Woodbury, MN
F	14	Lauren Handy	6 ft 2 in (1.88 m)	So	Northern Collegiate	Sarnia, ON
F	15	Cassidy Derda (I) (redshirt)	6 ft 2 in (1.88 m)	Jr	Tilton School; St. Francis Brooklyn	South Burlington, VT
F	21	Courtney Wright	6 ft 0 in (1.83 m)	So	Jacob Hespeler	Cambridge, ON
G	24	Kallie Banker	5 ft 10 in (1.78 m)	RS Sr	Grand Island; Rhode Island	Grand Island, NY
F	32	Rachel Merrill	6 ft 3 in (1.91 m)	Jr	Owego Free Academy	Owego, NY

Head coach

- Chris Day (West Chester)

Assistant coach(es)

- Alisa Kresge (Marist)
- Brian Donoghue (Drexel)
- Caroline Coyer (Villanova)

Legend

- (C) Team captain
- (S) Suspended
- (I) Ineligible
- (W) Walk-on
- Injured
- Current redshirt

Roster

== Schedule ==
Date time, TV	Rank^{#}	Opponent^{#}	Result	Record	Site (attendance) city, state
Exhibition
11/05/2016*; 4:00 pm		Saint Michael's College	W 71–55		Patrick Gym (386); Burlington, VT
Non-conference regular season
11/11/2016*; 7:00 pm		Bryant	L 57–63	0–1	Patrick Gym (592); Burlington, VT
11/13/2016*; 2:00 pm		Dartmouth	W 59–54	1–1	Patrick Gym (580); Burlington, VT
11/18/2016*; 7:00 pm		at Central Connecticut	L 76–78 ^{OT}	1–2	William H. Detrick Gymnasium (620); New Britain, CT
11/20/2016*; 2:00 pm		at Yale	L 48–77	1–3	John J. Lee Amphitheater (241); New Haven, CT
11/25/2016*; 7:00 pm		NJIT; TD Bank Classic semifinals	W 64–42	2–3	Patrick Gym (478); Burlington, VT
11/26/2016*; 7:00 pm		Milwaukee; TD Bank Classic championship	L 44–68	2–4	Patrick Gym (437); Burlington, VT
11/30/2016*; 7:00 pm		Holy Cross	W 63–52	3–4	Patrick Gym (459); Burlington, VT
12/04/2016*; 2:00 pm		at Temple	L 39–53	3–5	McGonigle Hall (1,404); Philadelphia, PA
12/04/2016*; 11:30 am		Brown	L 50–62	3–6	Patrick Gym (1,206); Burlington, VT
12/17/2016*; 12:00 pm		at Michigan	L 56–78	3–7	Crisler Center (2,187); Ann Arbor, MI
12/20/2016*; 1:00 pm		at Oakland	L 55–79	3–8	Athletics Center O'rena (565); Rochester, MI
12/30/2016*; 2:00 pm		at Howard	L 57–64	3–9	Burr Gymnasium (156); Washington, D.C.
America East regular season
01/04/2017; 7:00 pm		Maine	W 55–52	4–9 (1–0)	Patrick Gym (348); Burlington, VT
01/07/2017; 7:00 pm		at Hartford	L 55–68	4–10 (1–1)	Chase Arena at Reich Family Pavilion (747); Hartford, CT
01/11/2017; 7:00 pm, AETV		Binghamton	L 55–64	4–11 (1–2)	Patrick Gym (345); Burlington, VT
01/14/2017; 1:00 pm, ESPN3		at UMBC	L 66–69 ^{OT}	4–12 (1–3)	Retriever Activities Center (355); Catonsville, MD
01/16/2017; 1:00 pm, AETV		New Hampshire	L 50–58	4–13 (1–4)	Patrick Gym (542); Burlington, VT
01/19/2017; 7:00 pm, ESPN3		at UMass Lowell	W 61–46	5–13 (2–4)	Costello Athletic Center (204); Lowell, MA
01/26/2017; 12:00 pm, ESPN3		at Albany	L 53–64	5–14 (2–5)	SEFCU Arena (1,742); Albany, NY
01/28/2017; 2:00 pm, ESPN3		Stony Brook	W 53–43	6–14 (3–5)	Patrick Gym (644); Burlington, VT
02/01/2017; 7:00 pm, ESPN3		at Maine	L 43–59	6–15 (3–6)	Cross Insurance Center (1,193); Bangor, ME
02/04/2017; 2:00 pm, ESPN3		Hartford	W 76–70	7–15 (4–6)	Patrick Gym (922); Burlington, VT
02/06/2017; 7:00 pm, ESPN3		at Binghamton	L 61–76	7–16 (4–7)	Binghamton University Events Center; Vestal, NY
02/09/2017; 7:00 pm, ESPN3		at New Hampshire	L 47–66	7–17 (4–8)	Lundholm Gym (101); Durham, NH
02/11/2017; 2:00 pm, ESPN3		UMBC	L 52–64	7–18 (4–9)	Patrick Gym (505); Burlington, VT
02/15/2017; 7:00 pm, ESPN3		UMass Lowell	W 60–36	8–18 (5–9)	Patrick Gym (431); Burlington, VT
02/23/2017; 7:00 pm, ESPN3		Albany	L 52–67	8–19 (5–10)	Patrick Gym (426); Burlington, VT
02/26/2017; 2:00 pm, ESPN3		at Stony Brook	W 57–43	9–19 (6–10)	Island Federal Credit Union Arena (810); Stony Brook, NY
America East Women's Tournament
03/04/2017; 6:00 pm, ESPN3		vs. Albany; Quarterfinals	L 45–65	9–20	Cross Insurance Arena; Portland, ME
*Non-conference game. ^{#}Rankings from AP Poll. (#) Tournament seedings in parentheses. All times are in Eastern Time.

== See also ==
- 2016–17 Vermont Catamounts men's basketball team
