= 2017 America East women's basketball tournament =

- Classification: Division I
- Season: 2016–17
- Teams: 8
- Quarterfinals site: Cross Insurance Arena; Portland, ME
- Semifinals site: Cross Insurance Arena; Portland, ME
- Finals site: SEFCU Arena; Albany, NY
- Champions: Albany (6th title)
- Winning coach: Joanna Bernabei-McNamee (1st title)
- Television: ESPNU/ESPN3
- America East women's basketball tournaments

2016–17 America East Conference women's basketball standings
	Conf.				Overall
Team	W		L	PCT	W		L	PCT
New Hampshire	15	–	1	.938	26	–	6	.813
Albany †	12	–	4	.750	21	–	12	.636
UMBC	10	–	6	.625	15	–	16	.484
Maine	9	–	7	.563	18	–	16	.529
Binghamton	8	–	8	.500	13	–	17	.433
Hartford	7	–	9	.438	17	–	14	.548
Vermont	6	–	10	.375	9	–	20	.310
Stony Brook	5	–	11	.313	12	–	18	.400
UMass Lowell*	0	–	16	.000	3	–	26	.103
† 2017 America East tournament winner As of March 18, 2017 *ineligible for postseason play due to Div. I transitions Rankings from AP poll

The 2017 America East women's basketball tournament was the postseason women's basketball tournament for the America East Conference. It was held March 4 through 10, 2017. The quarterfinals and semifinals were held at Cross Insurance Arena in Portland, ME, with the finals being held at the SEFCU Arena in Albany, NY. Albany won their 6th straight American East tournament title to earn an automatic bid to the 2017 NCAA tournament.

== Seeds ==
Teams were seeded by record within the conference, with a tiebreaker system to seed teams with identical conference records.

Seed	School	Conf	Overall	Tiebreaker
#1	New Hampshire	15–1	25–4	
#2	Albany	12–4	18–11	
#3	UMBC	10–6	15–14	
#4	Maine	9–7	16–15	
#5	Binghamton	8–8	13–16	
#6	Hartford	7–9	16–13	
#7	Vermont	6–10	9–19	
#8	Stony Brook	5–11	12–17	

== Schedule ==
All tournament games are nationally televised on an ESPN network:

Session	Game	Time*	Matchup^{#}	Television	Attendance
Quarterfinals – Saturday, March 4
1	1	12:00 PM	#1 New Hampshire 58 vs. #8 Stony Brook 49	ESPN3	941
1	2	2:30 PM	#4 Maine 57 vs. #5 Binghamton 40	ESPN3	941
2	3	6:00 PM	#2 Albany 65 vs. #7 Vermont 45	ESPN3	941
2	4	8:30 PM	#3 UMBC 40 vs. #6 Hartford 74	ESPN3	941
Semifinals – Sunday, March 5
3	5	2:00 PM	#1 New Hampshire 52 vs. #4 Maine 61	ESPN3	1,847
3	6	4:30 PM	#2 Albany 67 vs. # 6 Hartford 65	ESPN3	1,847
Championship Game – Friday, March 10
4	7	4:30 PM	#4 Maine at #2 Albany	ESPNU	
*Game Times in EST. #-Rankings denote tournament seeding.

== Bracket and Results ==
Quarterfinals; Saturday, March 4, 2017; ESPN3
3	UMBC	40
6	Hartford	74
2	Albany	65
7	Vermont	45
1	New Hampshire	58
8	Stony Brook	49
4	Maine	57
5	Binghamton	40

Semifinals; Sunday, March 5, 2017; ESPN3
6	Hartford	65
2	Albany	67
1	New Hampshire	52
4	Maine	61

Championship game Friday, March 10, 2017; ESPNU
2	Albany	66
4	Maine	50

All times listed are Eastern

== See also ==
- 2017 America East men's basketball tournament
