= Marysville Public Schools =

School district in Michigan

Address
- 495 E. Huron Blvd. Marysville, St. Clair, Michigan, 48040; United States

District information
- Grades: Pre-Kindergarten-12
- Superintendent: Tracie Eschenburg
- Schools: 5
- Budget: $37,923,000 2022-2023 expenditures
- NCES District ID: 2623040

Students and staff
- Students: 2,671 (2024-2025)
- Teachers: 135.02 FTE (2024-2025)
- Staff: 262.1 FTE (2024-2025)
- Student–teacher ratio: 19.78 (2024-2025)

Other information
- Website: www.marysville.k12.mi.us

Marysville Public Schools is a public school district in St. Clair County, Michigan, near the city of Port Huron. It serves Marysville and parts of Columbus Township, Kimball Township, St. Clair Township, and Wales Township.

== History ==
Marysville High School opened in 2010. The architect was French Associates. It replaced a school built in 1942 on the northeast corner of Michigan Avenue and Huron Boulevard. It was demolished when the new high school opened.

The first purpose-built high school in Marysville opened in February 1923. The 1942 high school was built on the same site and renamed the Annex. The Annex was destroyed by fire in 1976.

== Schools ==
Schools in Marysville Public Schools district
School	Address	Notes
Marysville High School	555 E. Huron Blvd., Marysville	Grades 9–12
Marysville Middle School	400 Collard Drive, Marysville	Grades 6–8
Gardens Elementary	1076 - 6th Street, Marysville	Grades PreK–5
Washington Elementary	905 - 16th Street, Marysville	Grades PreK–5
Morton Elementary	920 Lynwood, Marysville	Grades PreK–5
