= 2016–17 UMBC Retrievers women's basketball team =

Intercollegiate basketball season

2016–17 UMBC Retrievers women's basketball
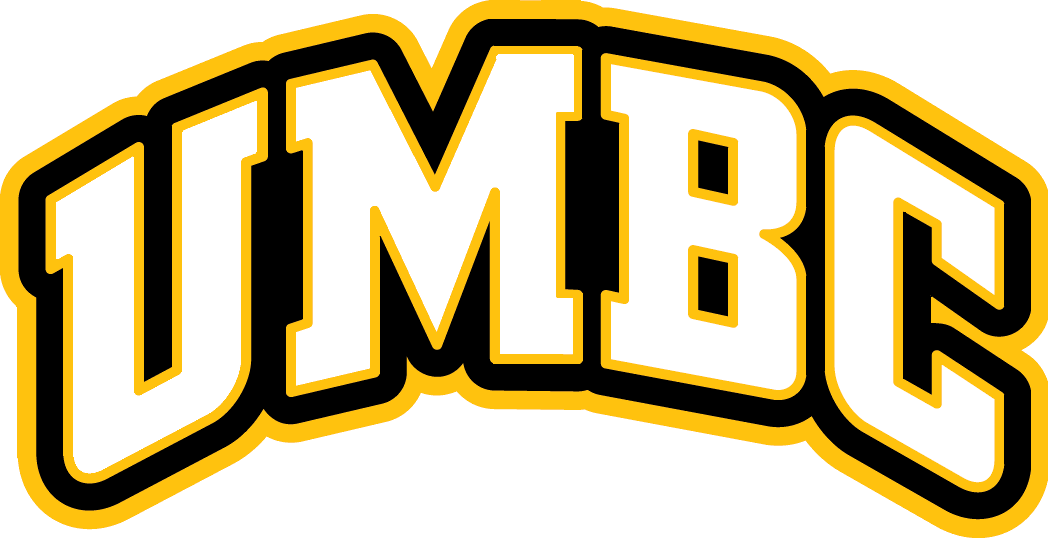

WBI, First Round
- Conference: America East Conference
- Record: 15–16 (10–6 America East)
- Head coach: Phil Stern (15th season)
- Assistant coaches: Carlee Cassidy-Dewey; Chelsea Barker Walsh; Courtnay Pilypaitis
- Home arena: Retriever Activities Center

2016–17 America East Conference women's basketball standings
	Conf.				Overall
Team	W		L	PCT	W		L	PCT
New Hampshire	15	–	1	.938	26	–	6	.813
Albany †	12	–	4	.750	21	–	12	.636
UMBC	10	–	6	.625	15	–	16	.484
Maine	9	–	7	.563	18	–	16	.529
Binghamton	8	–	8	.500	13	–	17	.433
Hartford	7	–	9	.438	17	–	14	.548
Vermont	6	–	10	.375	9	–	20	.310
Stony Brook	5	–	11	.313	12	–	18	.400
UMass Lowell*	0	–	16	.000	3	–	26	.103
† 2017 America East tournament winner As of March 18, 2017 *ineligible for postseason play due to Div. I transitions Rankings from AP poll

The 2016–17 UMBC Retrievers women's basketball team represented the University of Maryland, Baltimore County during the 2016–17 NCAA Division I women's basketball season. The Retrievers, led by 15th-year head coach Phil Stern, played their home games in the Retriever Activities Center as members of the America East Conference. They finished the season 15–15, 10–6 in America East play to finish in third place. They lost in the quarterfinals of the America East women's tournament to Hartford. They were invited to the Women's Basketball Invitational, where they lost to Brown in the first round.

== Media ==
All non-televised home games and conference road games were streamed on either ESPN3 or AmericaEast.tv. Most road games were streamed on the opponent's website. Select games were broadcast on the radio on WQLL-1370 AM.

== Roster ==
2016–17 UMBC Retrievers women's basketball team
Players
Coaches

Pos.	#	Name	Height	Year	Previous school	Hometown
G	0	Stixz Wilson	5 ft 6 in (1.68 m)	RS Jr	Seton Keough; Howard	Baltimore, MD
G	2	Marissa Sommerville	5 ft 6 in (1.68 m)	Sr	St. Mary's Ryken	Loveville, MD
G	3	Te'yJah Oliver	5 ft 8 in (1.73 m)	Fr	Riverdale Baptist	Clinton, MD
G	4	Taylor McCarley	5 ft 10 in (1.78 m)	Sr	Academy of the Holy Cross	Bowie, MD
F	10	Chukwuma Chiamaka	5 ft 11 in (1.8 m)	Sr	Eastern Arizona College	Lagos, Nigeria
F	13	Pandora Wilson	6 ft 1 in (1.85 m)	RS Sr	Academy of the Holy Cross	Gaithersburg, MD
F/C	15	Amanda Hagaman	6 ft 2 in (1.88 m)	Sr	Manasquan	Manasquan, NJ
G	21	Carly Harris	5 ft 6 in (1.68 m)	Jr	Shaler Area	Glenshaw, PA
G	23	Emily Russo	5 ft 6 in (1.68 m)	Sr	Glenelg	Woodbine, MD
F/C	24	Lucrezia Costa	6 ft 2 in (1.88 m)	Fr	Liceo Classico Enrico Perito	Rome, Italy
G	25	Laura Castaldo	5 ft 8 in (1.73 m)	Jr	Clarkstown South	West Nyack, NY
G	31	Brittany Burgess	6 ft 0 in (1.83 m)	RS Jr	St. Mary's Ryken; VCU	White Plains, MD
G	35	Allison McGrath	5 ft 10 in (1.78 m)	Fr	South Park	South Park, PA
G	42	Tyler Moore	5 ft 9 in (1.75 m)	Fr	Norfolk Academy	Portsmouth, VA
F	44	Kayla Hinderlie	6 ft 2 in (1.88 m)	Fr	Edmund Burke School	Silver Spring, MD
F	45	Lakiah Sims	6 ft 1 in (1.85 m)	Jr	Charles Drew; Palm Beach State	Riverdale, GA

Head coach

- Phil Stern (Concordia (NY))

Assistant coach(es)

- Carlee Cassidy-Dewey (UMBC)
- Chelsea Barker Walsh (UMBC)
- Courtnay Pilypaitis (Vermont)

Legend

- (C) Team captain
- (S) Suspended
- (I) Ineligible
- (W) Walk-on
- Injured
- Current redshirt

Roster

== Schedule ==
Date time, TV	Rank^{#}	Opponent^{#}	Result	Record	Site (attendance) city, state
Non-conference regular season
11/11/2016*; 2:00 pm		at Columbia	W 67–56	1–0	Levien Gymnasium (326); New York City, NY
11/13/2016*; 1:00 pm		Gettysburg	W 71–51	2–0	Retriever Activities Center (362); Catonsville, MD
11/19/2016*; 1:00 pm		Maryland Eastern Shore	L 57–70	2–1	Retriever Activities Center (719); Catonsville, MD
11/22/2016*; 7:00 pm		Towson	L 48–59	2–2	Retriever Activities Center (382); Catonsville, MD
11/27/2016*; 1:00 pm		Princeton	L 58–69	2–3	Retriever Activities Center (356); Catonsville, MD
11/30/2016*; 7:00 pm		at American	L 58–69	2–4	Bender Arena (287); Washington, D.C.
12/04/2016*; 2:00 pm, BTN		at No. 5 Maryland	L 42–92	2–5	Xfinity Center (2,607); College Park, MD
12/07/2016*; 7:00 pm, ESPN3		Morgan State	L 61–69	2–6	Retriever Activities Center (604); Catonsville, MD
12/10/2016*; 1:00 pm, ESPN3		Loyola (MD)	L 65–70	2–7	Retriever Activities Center (380); Catonsville, MD
12/21/2016*; 5:00 pm		at LIU Brooklyn	W 57–45	3–7	Barclays Center; Brooklyn, NY
12/28/2016*; 7:00 pm, ACCN Extra		at Virginia; Cavalier Classic	L 30–56	3–8	John Paul Jones Arena (2,883); Charlottesville, VA
12/29/2016*; 4:30 pm		vs. Liberty; Cavalier Classic	W 62–51	4–8	John Paul Jones Arena; Charlottesville, VA
12/31/2016*; 1:00 pm, ESPN3		Coppin State	W 73–63	5–8	Retriever Activities Center (410); Catonsville, MD
America East regular season
01/04/2017; 7:00 pm, ESPN3		at Binghamton	L 62–69	5–9 (0–1)	Binghamton University Events Center (1,225); Vestal, NY
01/07/2017; 12:00 pm, ESPN3		at Maine	L 40–72	5–10 (0–2)	Cross Insurance Center (1,673); Bangor, ME
01/11/2017; 7:00 pm, ESPN3		Hartford	L 73–80	5–11 (0–3)	Retriever Activities Center (341); Catonsville, MD
01/14/2017; 1:00 pm, ESPN3		Vermont	W 69–66 ^{OT}	6–11 (1–3)	Retriever Activities Center (355); Catonsville, MD
01/16/2017; 7:00 pm, ESPN3		at Albany	W 64–56	7–11 (2–3)	SEFCU Arena (956); Albany, NY
01/22/2017; 1:00 pm, ESPN3		UMass Lowell	W 79–72	8–11 (3–3)	Retriever Activities Center (275); Catonsville, MD
01/25/2017; 12:00 pm, ESPN3		Stony Brook	W 67–61	9–11 (4–3)	Retriever Activities Center (2,169); Catonsville, MD
01/28/2017; 12:00 pm, ESPN3		at New Hampshire	L 50–60	9–12 (4–4)	Lundholm Gym (477); Durham, NH
02/01/2017; 7:00 pm, ESPN3		Binghamton	W 53–45	10–12 (5–4)	Retriever Activities Center (342); Catonsville, MD
02/04/2017; 1:00 pm, ESPN3		Maine	W 66–62	11–12 (6–4)	Retriever Activities Center (418); Catonsville, MD
02/10/2017; 2:00 pm, ESPN3		at Hartford	W 64–47	12–12 (7–4)	Chase Arena at Reich Family Pavilion (618); Hartford, CT
02/11/2017; 2:00 pm, ESPN3		at Vermont	W 64–52	13–12 (8–4)	Patrick Gym (505); Burlington, VT
02/15/2017; 7:00 pm, ESPN3		Albany	W 63–60	14–12 (9–4)	Retriever Activities Center (555); Catonsville, MD
02/18/2017; 1:00 pm, ESPN3		at UMass Lowell	W 78–62	15–12 (10–4)	Tsongas Center (2,291); Lowell, MA
02/23/2017; 7:00 pm, ESPN3		at Stony Brook	L 37–51	15–13 (10–5)	Island Federal Credit Union Arena (552); Stony Brook, NY
02/26/2017; 12:00 pm, ESPN3		New Hampshire	L 61–65	15–14 (10–6)	Retriever Activities Center (639); Catonsville, MD
America East Women's Tournament
03/04/2017; 8:30 pm, ESPN3		vs. Hartford; Quarterfinals	L 40–74	15–15	Cross Insurance Arena (941); Portland, ME
WBI
03/16/2017*; 7:00 pm		Brown; First Round	L 75–81	15–16	Retriever Activities Center (250); Catonsville, MD
*Non-conference game. ^{#}Rankings from AP Poll. (#) Tournament seedings in parentheses. All times are in Eastern Time.

== See also ==
- 2015–16 UMBC Retrievers women's basketball team
- 2016–17 UMBC Retrievers men's basketball team
