= Marysville Power Plant =

Power plant

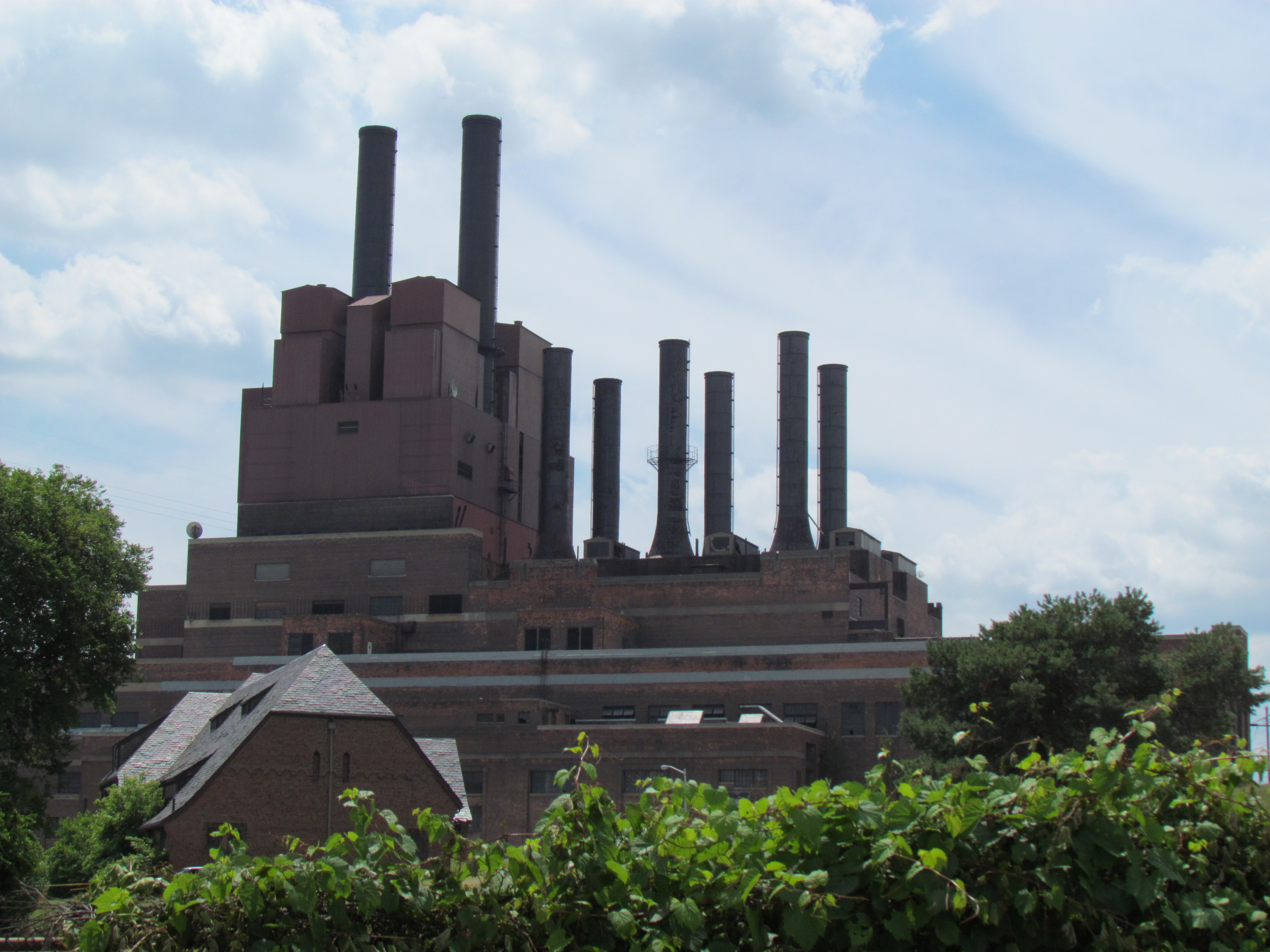
- Marysville Power Plant seen from the North
- Country: United States
- Location: Marysville, St. Clair County, Michigan
- Coordinates: 42°55′34″N 82°27′41″W
- Status: Demolished
- Commission date: 1922
- Decommission date: 2001
- Owner: Detroit Edison

Thermal power station
- Primary fuel: Coal
- Turbine technology: Steam turbine
- Cooling source: St. Clair River

Power generation
- Units operational: 7
- Nameplate capacity: 300 MWe
- Plant was in standby between 1988-1992 and 2001-2012

The Marysville Power Plant, nicknamed the Mighty Marysville, was a coal-fired power plant in Marysville, Michigan on the shore of the St. Clair River. The plant was demolished on November 7, 2015, after the land was sold to a developer.

== History of the Property ==
The power plant was built on land that formerly housed a lumber mill. The mill was erected in 1690 and is claimed to be the first European settlement in present-day St. Clair County. In 1817 legislator, judge, and businessman Zephaniah W. Bunce came to the area. He named it "Bunceville" and the creek that ran through it "Bunce Creek". Bunceville, along with other small settlements along the St. Clair River would be consolidated into the community of Marysville in the late 1800s. The Bunce household was demolished for construction of the Power Plant and the creek was re-routed underneath the property. A rock and plaque mark the location of the Bunce homestead on the Detroit Edison property.

== History of the Plant ==
Work on the plant began in 1914, as demand grew for electrical power north of Metro Detroit. The plant started generating electricity in 1922 with its first original two units. Two more units were added in 1926. During the mid 1940s, the "high side" was added to the power plant. The "high side" referred to higher pressure steam which could turn higher capacity 75MW generators. During this period nearly 300 people worked at the Power Plant. The plant also had a max capacity of 300MW when both the low and high sides were operational. Between 1988 and 1992 the plant was idled, and returned to service in 1992. For nearly the next ten years, the power plant would continue to run with the two "high side" units with a total of 150MW. In 2001 the plant was idled again. In 2012 the plant was officially decommissioned and the property was placed on the market.

== Demolition and Implosion ==
Implosion of DTE Energy's former Marysville Power Plant

DTE Energy placed the property on the market in 2012 and held an auction to sell any remaining equipment of value inside the plant. The property was sold to Commercial Development Corporation 2013. Contractors began demolition shortly after, demolishing the plant's turbine hall and historic club house. On November 7, 2015, the remaining boiler house was imploded.

Plans for the site include a hotel, condos, and marina.

== See also ==
- List of power stations in Michigan
