= 2016–17 Stony Brook Seawolves women's basketball team =

Intercollegiate basketball season

2016–17 Stony Brook Seawolves women's basketball
- Conference: America East Conference
- Record: 12–18 (5–11 America East)
- Head coach: Caroline McCombs (3rd season)
- Assistant coaches: Dan Rickard; Janie Mitchell; Audrey Cunningham
- Home arena: Island Federal Credit Union Arena

2016–17 America East Conference women's basketball standings
	Conf.				Overall
Team	W		L	PCT	W		L	PCT
New Hampshire	15	–	1	.938	26	–	6	.813
Albany †	12	–	4	.750	21	–	12	.636
UMBC	10	–	6	.625	15	–	16	.484
Maine	9	–	7	.563	18	–	16	.529
Binghamton	8	–	8	.500	13	–	17	.433
Hartford	7	–	9	.438	17	–	14	.548
Vermont	6	–	10	.375	9	–	20	.310
Stony Brook	5	–	11	.313	12	–	18	.400
UMass Lowell*	0	–	16	.000	3	–	26	.103
† 2017 America East tournament winner As of March 18, 2017 *ineligible for postseason play due to Div. I transitions Rankings from AP poll

The 2016–17 Stony Brook Seawolves women's basketball team represented Stony Brook University during the 2016–17 NCAA Division I women's basketball season. The Seawolves, led by third year head coach Caroline McCombs, played their home games at the Island Federal Credit Union Arena and are members in the America East Conference. They finished the season 12–18, 5–11 in America East play to finish in eighth place. They lost in the quarterfinals of the America East women's tournament to New Hampshire.

== Media ==
All non-televised home games and conference road games will stream on either ESPN3 or AmericaEast.tv. Most road games will stream on the opponents website. All games will have an audio broadcast streamed online through the Pack Network.

== Roster ==
2016–17 Stony Brook Seawolves women's basketball team
Players
Coaches

Pos.	#	Name	Height	Year	Previous school	Hometown
G	0	Lauren Williams	5 ft 8 in (1.73 m)	Jr	North Babylon; Florida Atlantic	Longwood, FL
G	1	Davion Wingate	5 ft 6 in (1.68 m)	So	Stephenson	Atlanta, GA
F	3	Oksana Gouchie-Provencher	6 ft 4 in (1.93 m)	Fr	Bill Crothers Secondary	Ontario
G	4	Christa Scognamiglio	5 ft 9 in (1.75 m)	RS Sr	Pearl River; Fairfield	Orangeburg, NY
G	5	Kori Bayne-Walker	5 ft 5 in (1.65 m)	Sr	Gates-Chili	Rochester, NY
G	11	Jerell Matthews	5 ft 9 in (1.75 m)	So	Marian Catholic	Chicago, IL
F	12	Kina Smith	6 ft 1 in (1.85 m)	Fr	Utica Academy of Science Charter School	Bronx, NY
G	14	Giolibeth Pérez	5 ft 7 in (1.7 m)	Fr	Ferguson	Camuy, PR
C	20	Ayshia Baker	6 ft 3 in (1.91 m)	So	George Jenkins; Florida State College at Jacksonville	Lakewood, FL
G	21	Aaliyah Worley	5 ft 11 in (1.8 m)	Jr	George Washington Carver	Philadelphia, PA
F	24	Elizabeth Manner	6 ft 1 in (1.85 m)	RS Jr	Oakton	Vienna, VA
F	30	Kyra Dixon	5 ft 11 in (1.8 m)	Fr	Collins Hill	Lawrenceville, GA
F	35	Anamaria Skaro	5 ft 11 in (1.8 m)	Jr	Garrett College	Split, Croatia

Head coach

- Caroline McCombs (Youngstown State)

Assistant coach(es)

- Dan Rickard (Stony Brook)
- Janie Mitchell (Georgia Tech)
- Audrey Cunningham (New Haven)

Legend

- (C) Team captain
- (S) Suspended
- (I) Ineligible
- (W) Walk-on
- Injured
- Current redshirt

Roster

== Schedule ==
Date time, TV	Rank^{#}	Opponent^{#}	Result	Record	Site (attendance) city, state
Non-conference regular season
11/11/2016*; 7:00 pm		at Iona	L 46–57	0–1	Hynes Athletic Center (1,004); New Rochelle, NY
11/14/2016*; 7:00 pm, ESPN3		Hofstra	L 64–67	0–2	Island Federal Credit Union Arena (701); Stony Brook, NY
11/18/2016*; 7:00 pm, ESPN3		No. 14 Syracuse	L 60–78	0–3	Island Federal Credit Union Arena (1,103); Stony Brook, NY
11/22/2016*; 7:00 pm, ESPN3		Columbia	W 55–53	1–3	Island Federal Credit Union Arena (501); Stony Brook, NY
11/26/2016*; 2:00 pm		at Manhattan	W 55–50	2–3	Draddy Gymnasium (427); Riverdale, NY
11/30/2016*; 5:30 pm		at St. Bonaventure	L 37–51	2–4	Alumni Arena (957); Amherst, NY
12/04/2016*; 2:00 pm		at LIU Brooklyn	L 48–58	2–5	Steinberg Wellness Center (306); Brooklyn, NY
12/11/2016*; 2:00 pm		at Central Connecticut	W 64–59	3–5	William H. Detrick Gymnasium (721); New Britain, CT
12/16/2016*; 7:00 pm, ESPN3		Molloy	W 62–53	4–5	Island Federal Credit Union Arena (616); Stony Brook, NY
12/20/2016*; 5:30 pm		vs. Florida A&M; Florida Sunshine Classic	W 80–49	5–5	Worden Arena (298); Winter Haven, FL
12/21/2016*; 7:45 pm		vs. Indiana; Florida Sunshine Classic	L 60–74	5–6	Worden Arena (304); Winter Haven, FL
12/30/2016*; 1:00 pm, ESPN3		Cornell	W 66–65 ^{2OT}	6–6	Island Federal Credit Union Arena (522); Stony Brook, NY
12/31/2016*; 1:00 pm, ESPN3		UMKC	W 57–55	7–6	Island Federal Credit Union Arena (487); Stony Brook, NY
America East regular season
01/04/2017; 11:00 am		at New Hampshire	L 46–49	7–7 (0–1)	Lundholm Gym (1,306); Durham, NH
01/07/2017; 2:00 pm		at Albany	L 54–64	7–8 (0–2)	SEFCU Arena (1,158); Albany, NY
01/14/2017; 1:00 pm, ESPN3		Maine	W 55–41	8–8 (1–2)	Island Federal Credit Union Arena (530); Stony Brook, NY
01/16/2017; 2:00 pm, ESPN3		UMass Lowell	W 83–53	9–8 (2–2)	Island Federal Credit Union Arena (554); Stony Brook, NY
01/19/2017; 7:00 pm, AE.tv		at Hartford	L 52–65	9–9 (2–3)	Chase Arena at Reich Family Pavilion (728); Hartford, CT
01/22/2017; 7:00 pm, ESPN3		Binghamton	L 40–48	9–10 (2–4)	Island Federal Credit Union Arena (1,142); Stony Brook, NY
01/25/2017; 12:00 pm, ESPN3		at UMBC	L 61–67	9–11 (2–5)	Retriever Activities Center (2,169); Catonsville, MD
01/28/2017; 2:00 pm, AE.tv		at Vermont	L 43–53	9–12 (2–6)	Patrick Gym (644); Burlington, VT
02/01/2017; 5:00 pm, ESPN3		New Hampshire	L 45–56	9–13 (2–7)	Island Federal Credit Union Arena (3,347); Stony Brook, NY
02/04/2017; 2:00 pm, ESPN3		Albany	L 57–75	9–14 (2–8)	Island Federal Credit Union Arena (1,262); Stony Brook, NY
02/06/2017; 7:00 pm, ESPN3		at UMass Lowell	W 86–44	10–14 (3–8)	Costello Athletic Center (202); Lowell, MA
02/12/2017; 1:00 pm, ESPN3		at Maine	L 71–78 ^{OT}	10–15 (3–9)	Cross Insurance Center (2,306); Bangor, ME
02/15/2017; 12:00 pm, ESPN3		Hartford	L 40–62	10–16 (3–10)	Island Federal Credit Union Arena (1,274); Stony Brook, NY
02/18/2017; 4:00 pm, ESPN3		at Binghamton	W 74–59	11–16 (4–10)	Binghamton University Events Center (1,477); Vestal, NY
02/23/2017; 7:00 pm, ESPN3		UMBC	W 51–37	12–16 (5–10)	Island Federal Credit Union Arena (552); Stony Brook, NY
02/26/2017; 2:00 pm, ESPN3		Vermont	L 43–57	12–17 (5–11)	Island Federal Credit Union Arena (810); Stony Brook, NY
America East Women's Tournament
03/04/2017; 12:00 pm, ESPN3		vs. New Hampshire; Quarterfinals	L 49–58	12–18	Cross Insurance Arena; Portland, ME
*Non-conference game. ^{#}Rankings from AP Poll. (#) Tournament seedings in parentheses. All times are in Eastern Time.

== See also ==
- 2016–17 Stony Brook Seawolves men's basketball team
