= 2016–17 New Hampshire Wildcats women's basketball team =

Intercollegiate basketball season

2016–17 New Hampshire Wildcats women's basketball

America East regular season champions

WNIT, First Round
- Conference: America East Conference
- Record: 26–6 (15–1 America East)
- Head coach: Maureen Magarity (7th season)
- Assistant coaches: Brendan Copes; Kelsey Hogan; Whitney Edwards
- Home arena: Lundholm Gym

2016–17 America East Conference women's basketball standings
	Conf.				Overall
Team	W		L	PCT	W		L	PCT
New Hampshire	15	–	1	.938	26	–	6	.813
Albany †	12	–	4	.750	21	–	12	.636
UMBC	10	–	6	.625	15	–	16	.484
Maine	9	–	7	.563	18	–	16	.529
Binghamton	8	–	8	.500	13	–	17	.433
Hartford	7	–	9	.438	17	–	14	.548
Vermont	6	–	10	.375	9	–	20	.310
Stony Brook	5	–	11	.313	12	–	18	.400
UMass Lowell*	0	–	16	.000	3	–	26	.103
† 2017 America East tournament winner As of March 18, 2017 *ineligible for postseason play due to Div. I transitions Rankings from AP poll

The 2016–17 New Hampshire Wildcats women's basketball team represented the University of New Hampshire during the 2016–17 NCAA Division I women's basketball season. The Wildcats, led by seventh-year head coach Maureen Magarity, played their home games in Lundholm Gym and were members of the America East Conference. They finished the season 26–6, 15–1 in America East play to win the America East regular season title. They advanced to the semifinals of the America East women's tournament, where they lost to Maine. As champs of the America East Conference who failed to win their conference tournament, they received an automatic bid to the Women's National Invitation Tournament, where they lost to Harvard in the first round.

== Media ==
All non-televised home games and conference road games streamed on either ESPN3 or AmericaEast.tv. Select home games aired on Fox College Sports, Live Well Network, or WBIN. Most road games streamed on the opponent's website. All conference home games and select non-conference home games were broadcast on the radio on WPKX and WGIR, and online on the New Hampshire Portal.

== Roster ==
2016–17 New Hampshire Wildcats women's basketball team
Players
Coaches

Pos.	#	Name	Height	Year	Previous school	Hometown
G	2	Brittni Lai	5 ft 6 in (1.68 m)	RS Jr	Irvington; Marist	Irvington, NY
G	3	Sarah Clement	5 ft 8 in (1.73 m)	Fr	Catherine McAuley	Falmouth, ME
G	4	Kristen Anderson	5 ft 7 in (1.7 m)	Sr	Leavitt	Greene, ME
G	10	Aliza Simpson	5 ft 9 in (1.75 m)	Jr	Londonderry	Londonderry, NH
F/C	11	Ashley Storey	6 ft 3 in (1.91 m)	So	Greely	Cumberland, ME
G	12	Peyton Booth (C)	5 ft 10 in (1.78 m)	Jr	Wadsworth	Mansfield, OH
G	13	Sam Sabino	5 ft 8 in (1.73 m)	So	Rumson Fair Haven	Rumson, NJ
F	15	Corinne Coia (C)	6 ft 4 in (1.93 m)	RS Sr	The Lincoln School; Rhode Island	North Smithfield, RI
G/F	21	Alli Gribbin	5 ft 11 in (1.8 m)	So	Keller	Keller, TX
G	25	Emily Peters	5 ft 6 in (1.68 m)	RS So	Forest Lake	Lindstrom, MN
C	32	Carlie Pogue	6 ft 2 in (1.88 m)	Jr	Princeton	Cincinnati, OH
G	33	Caroline Soucy	5 ft 9 in (1.75 m)	Fr	Marianapolis Prep	Beverly, MA
F	35	Kat Fogarty (C)	6 ft 2 in (1.88 m)	RS Jr	Pittsford Sutherland; Marist	Peterborough, NH
G/F	44	Olivia Healy	5 ft 10 in (1.78 m)	RS Jr	Reading Memorial; Richmond	Reading, MA
C	50	Morgan Bassett-Smith	6 ft 2 in (1.88 m)	Jr	Pickerington North	Pickerington, OH

Head coach

- Maureen Magarity (Marist)

Assistant coach(es)

- Brendan Copes (Marist)
- Kelsey Hogan (New Hampshire)
- Whitney Edwards (New Hampshire)

Legend

- (C) Team captain
- (S) Suspended
- (I) Ineligible
- (W) Walk-on
- Injured
- Current redshirt

Roster

== Schedule ==
Date time, TV	Rank^{#}	Opponent^{#}	Result	Record	Site (attendance) city, state
Non-conference regular season
11/11/2016*; 7:00 pm		at Cornell	L 56–63	0–1	Newman Arena (312); Ithaca, NY
11/14/2016*; 7:00 pm, AETV		New England College	W 58–38	1–1	Lundholm Gym (148); Durham, NH
11/17/2016*; 11:00 am		at No. 15 Kentucky	L 43–92	1–2	Memorial Coliseum (4,793); Lexington, KY
11/22/2016*; 5:00 pm, AETV		Bryant	W 62–60	2–2	Lundholm Gym (163); Durham, NH
11/26/2016*; 7:00 pm, AETV		Wagner	W 73–40	3–2	Lundholm Gym (237); Durham, NH
11/28/2016*; 7:00 pm		at Boston University	W 59–51	4–2	Case Gym (151); Boston, MA
12/01/2016*; 7:00 pm		at Northeastern	W 66–63 ^{OT}	5–2	Cabot Center (231); Boston, MA
12/06/2016*; 7:00 pm		at Siena	W 77–67	6–2	Alumni Recreation Center (350); Loudonville, NY
12/11/2016*; 1:00 pm, AETV		Yale	L 58–65	6–3	Lundholm Gym (351); Durham, NH
12/18/2016*; 1:00 pm, AETV		Sacred Heart	W 71–43	7–3	Lundholm Gym (272); Durham, NH
12/21/2016*; 4:30 pm, ESPN3		Central Connecticut	W 56–52	8–3	Lundholm Gym (227); Durham, NH
12/28/2016*; 7:00 pm		at Manhattan	W 59–42	9–3	Draddy Gymnasium (451); Riverdale, NY
12/31/2016*; 1:00 pm, ESPN3		Dartmouth; Rivalry	W 64–47	10–3	Lundholm Gym (496); Durham, NH
America East regular season
01/04/2017; 11:00 am, ESPN3		Stony Brook	W 49–46	11–3 (1–0)	Lundholm Gym (1,306); Durham, NH
01/11/2017; 7:00 pm, ESPN3		Albany	W 71–58	12–3 (2–0)	Lundholm Gym (268); Durham, NH
01/14/2017; 4:00 pm		at Binghamton	W 70–62	13–3 (3–0)	Binghamton University Events Center (1,590); Vestal, NY
01/16/2017; 1:00 pm, AETV		at Vermont	W 57–49	14–3 (4–0)	Patrick Gym (542); Burlington, VT
01/19/2017; 7:00 pm, ESPN3		Maine	W 50–44	15–3 (5–0)	Lundholm Gym (403); Durham, NH
01/22/2017; 1:00 pm, ESPN3		Hartford	W 58–50	16–3 (6–0)	Lundholm Gym (436); Durham, NH
01/25/2017; 11:00 am, ESPN3		at UMass Lowell	W 76–57	17–3 (7–0)	Tsongas Center (4,192); Lowell, MA
01/28/2017; 12:00 pm, AETV		UMBC	W 60–50	18–3 (8–0)	Lundholm Gym (477); Durham, NH
02/01/2017; 5:00 pm		at Stony Brook	W 56–45	19–3 (9–0)	Island Federal Credit Union Arena (3,347); Stony Brook, NY
02/06/2017; 7:00 pm		at Albany	L 55–64	19–4 (9–1)	SEFCU Arena (1,076); Albany, NY
02/09/2017; 7:00 pm, ESPN3		Vermont	W 66–47	20–4 (10–1)	Lundholm Gym (101); Durham, NH
02/12/2017; 1:00 pm, ESPN3		Binghamton	W 76–69	21–4 (11–1)	Lundholm Gym (723); Durham, NH
02/15/2017; 7:00 pm		at Maine	W 65–57	22–4 (12–1)	Cross Insurance Center (1,645); Bangor, ME
02/18/2017; 2:00 pm		at Hartford	W 62–57	23–4 (13–1)	Chase Arena at Reich Family Pavilion (1,625); Hartford, CT
02/23/2017; 7:00 pm, ESPN3		UMass Lowell	W 58–45	24–4 (14–1)	Lundholm Gym (565); Durham, NH
02/26/2017; 12:00 pm, ESPN3		at UMBC	W 65–61	25–4 (15–1)	Retriever Activities Center (639); Catonsville, MD
America East Women's Tournament
03/04/2017; 12:00 pm, ESPN3		vs. Stony Brook; Quarterfinals	W 58–49	26–4	Cross Insurance Arena; Portland, ME
03/05/2017; 2:00 pm, ESPN3		vs. Maine; Semifinals	L 52–61	26–5	Cross Insurance Arena; Portland, ME
Women's National Invitation Tournament
03/17/2017*; 7:00 pm		Harvard; First Round	L 56–69	26–6	Lundholm Gym (387); Durham, NH
*Non-conference game. ^{#}Rankings from AP Poll. (#) Tournament seedings in parentheses. All times are in Eastern Time.

== Rankings ==
+ Regular season polls	Poll	Pre- season	Week 2	Week 3	Week 4	Week 5	Week 6	Week 7	Week 8	Week 9	Week 10	Week 11	Week 12	Week 13	Week 14	Week 15	Week 16	Week 17	Week 18	Week 19	Final
AP	NR	NR	NR	NR	NR	NR	NR	NR	NR	NR	NR	NR	NR	NR	NR	NR	NR	NR	NR	N/A	
Coaches	NR	NR	NR	NR	NR	NR	NR	NR	NR	NR	NR	NR	NR	NR	NR	RV	NR	NR	NR		

Legend
	Increase in ranking
	Decrease in ranking
	No change
(RV)	Received votes

== See also ==
- 2016–17 New Hampshire Wildcats men's basketball team
