= 2016–17 Hartford Hawks women's basketball team =

Intercollegiate basketball season

2016–17 Hartford Hawks women's basketball

Christmas City Classic Champions
- Conference: America East Conference
- Record: 17–14 (7–9 America East)
- Head coach: Kim McNeill (1st season)
- Assistant coaches: Cory McNeill; Ebony Moore; Robin Dolan
- Home arena: Chase Arena at Reich Family Pavilion

2016–17 America East Conference women's basketball standings
	Conf.				Overall
Team	W		L	PCT	W		L	PCT
New Hampshire	15	–	1	.938	26	–	6	.813
Albany †	12	–	4	.750	21	–	12	.636
UMBC	10	–	6	.625	15	–	16	.484
Maine	9	–	7	.563	18	–	16	.529
Binghamton	8	–	8	.500	13	–	17	.433
Hartford	7	–	9	.438	17	–	14	.548
Vermont	6	–	10	.375	9	–	20	.310
Stony Brook	5	–	11	.313	12	–	18	.400
UMass Lowell*	0	–	16	.000	3	–	26	.103
† 2017 America East tournament winner As of March 18, 2017 *ineligible for postseason play due to Div. I transitions Rankings from AP poll

The 2016–17 Hartford Hawks women's basketball team represented the University of Hartford during the 2016–17 NCAA Division I women's basketball season. The Hawks, led by first year head coach Kim McNeill, played their home games in the Chase Arena at Reich Family Pavilion and were members of the America East Conference. They finished the season 17–14, 7–9 in America East play to finish in sixth place. They advanced to the semifinals of the America East women's tournament, where they lost to Albany.

== Media ==
All home games and conference road games will stream on either ESPN3 or AmericaEast.tv. Most road games will stream on the opponents website. All games will be broadcast on the radio on WWUH.

== Roster ==
2016–17 Hartford Hawks women's basketball team
Players
Coaches

Pos.	#	Name	Height	Year	Previous school	Hometown
G	2	Sierra DaCoasta	5 ft 9 in (1.75 m)	Fr	Bishop McDevitt	Philadelphia, PA
G	3	Deanna Mayza	5 ft 7 in (1.7 m)	Sr	The Hill School	Pennsburg, PA
G	5	Lindsey Abed	5 ft 6 in (1.68 m)	So	Oakton	Oakton, VA
G	10	Mary Pattison	5 ft 9 in (1.75 m)	Jr	Troy	Troy, NY
F	12	La'Trice Hall	5 ft 11 in (1.8 m)	Sr	Buffalo Academy of the Sacred Heart	Buffalo, NY
G/F	13	Kelly Douglass	5 ft 10 in (1.78 m)	So	Clifton	Clifton, NJ
F	15	Darby Lee	6 ft 0 in (1.83 m)	Jr	Altoona Area	Altoona, PA
F	20	Jalay Knowles	6 ft 0 in (1.83 m)	So	Ossining	Ossining, NY
G/F	22	Erin Jones	6 ft 1 in (1.85 m)	Fr	Voorhees	High Bridge, NJ
G	23	Jess Camarda	5 ft 6 in (1.68 m)	Fr	Ridgefield	Ridgefield, CT
F	24	Alyssa Reaves	6 ft 0 in (1.83 m)	Sr	Northwest Catholic	Bloomfield, CT
F	33	Janelle Harrison	6 ft 0 in (1.83 m)	Jr	Cromwell	Cromwell, CT

Head coach

- Kim McNeill (Richmond)

Assistant coach(es)

- Cory McNeill (Morgan State)
- Ebony Moore (Richmond)
- Robin Dolan (Wagner)

Legend

- (C) Team captain
- (S) Suspended
- (I) Ineligible
- (W) Walk-on
- Injured
- Current redshirt

Roster

== Schedule ==
Date time, TV	Rank^{#}	Opponent^{#}	Result	Record	Site (attendance) city, state
Non-conference regular season
11/11/2016*; 7:00 pm		Boston College	W 65–56	1–0	Chase Arena at Reich Family Pavilion (1,078); Hartford, CT
11/13/2016*; 2:00 pm		Florida Gulf Coast	L 63–70	1–1	Chase Arena at Reich Family Pavilion (505); Hartford, CT
11/16/2016*; 7:00 pm		at Central Connecticut; Rivalry	W 68–58	2–1	William H. Detrick Gymnasium (748); New Britain, CT
11/19/2016*; 7:00 pm		at Siena	W 80–76	3–1	Alumni Recreation Center (580); Loudonville, NY
11/22/2016*; 7:00 pm		Providence	L 65–77	3–2	Chase Arena at Reich Family Pavilion (654); Hartford, CT
11/26/2016*; 2:00 pm		vs. Monmouth; Christmas City Classic semifinals	W 75–72	4–2	Stabler Arena (629); Bethlehem, PA
11/27/2016*; 4:00 pm		vs. Norfolk State; Christmas City Classic championship	W 61–51	5–2	Stabler Arena (642); Bethlehem, PA
11/30/2016*; 6:00 pm		Massachusetts	W 75–56	6–2	Chase Arena at Reich Family Pavilion; Hartford, CT
12/04/2016*; 2:00 pm		Sacred Heart	W 81–64	7–2	Chase Arena at Reich Family Pavilion (753); Hartford, CT
12/07/2016*; 7:00 pm		at Niagara	L 62–75	7–3	Gallagher Center (354); Lewiston, NY
12/10/2016*; 2:00 pm		Quinnipiac	L 59–82	7–4	Chase Arena at Reich Family Pavilion (1,072); Hartford, CT
12/21/2016*; 7:00 pm		at Delaware	W 67–66	8–4	Bob Carpenter Center (1,370); Newark, DE
12/30/2016*; 7:00 pm		at Hofstra	W 69–67 ^{OT}	9–4	Hofstra Arena (354); Hempstead, NY
America East regular season
01/07/2017; 7:00 pm		Vermont	W 68–55	10–4 (1–0)	Chase Arena at Reich Family Pavilion (747); Hartford, CT
01/11/2017; 7:00 pm, ESPN3		at UMBC	W 80–73	11–4 (2–0)	Retriever Activities Center (341); Catonsville, MD
01/14/2017; 2:00 pm		UMass Lowell	W 80–59	12–4 (3–0)	Chase Arena at Reich Family Pavilion (948); Hartford, CT
01/16/2017; 1:00 pm		at Maine	L 62–73	12–5 (3–1)	Cross Insurance Center (1,359); Bangor, ME
01/19/2017; 7:00 pm		Stony Brook	W 65–52	13–5 (4–1)	Chase Arena at Reich Family Pavilion (728); Hartford, CT
01/22/2017; 1:00 pm, ESPN3		at New Hampshire	L 50–58	13–6 (4–2)	Lundholm Gym (436); Durham, NH
01/25/2017; 7:00 pm, ESPN3		Binghamton	W 76–73 ^{2OT}	14–6 (5–2)	Chase Arena at Reich Family Pavilion (1,011); Hartford, CT
01/28/2017; 2:00 pm, ESPN3		at Albany	L 71–82	14–7 (5–3)	SEFCU Arena (1,876); Albany, NY
02/04/2017; 2:00 pm, ESPN3		at Vermont	L 70–76	14–8 (5–4)	Patrick Gym (922); Burlington, VT
02/06/2017; 7:00 pm, ESPN3		Maine	L 60–66	14–9 (5–5)	Chase Arena at Reich Family Pavilion (1,003); Hartford, CT
02/10/2017; 2:00 pm, ESPN3		UMBC	L 47–64	14–10 (5–6)	Chase Arena at Reich Family Pavilion (618); Hartford, CT
02/12/2017; 2:00 pm, ESPN3		at UMass Lowell	W 84–64	15–10 (6–6)	Tsongas Center (803); Lowell, MA
02/15/2017; 12:00 pm, ESPN3		at Stony Brook	W 62–40	16–10 (7–6)	Island Federal Credit Union Arena (1,274); Stony Brook, NY
02/18/2017; 2:00 pm, ESPN3		New Hampshire	L 57–62	16–11 (7–7)	Chase Arena at Reich Family Pavilion (1,625); Hartford, CT
02/23/2017; 7:00 pm, ESPN3		at Binghamton	L 59–60	16–12 (7–8)	Binghamton University Events Center (1,470); Vestal, NY
02/26/2017; 2:00 pm, ESPN3		Albany	L 52–58	16–13 (7–9)	Chase Arena at Reich Family Pavilion (1,524); Hartford, CT
America East Women's Tournament
03/04/2017; 8:30 pm, ESPN3	(6)	vs. (3) UMBC; Quarterfinals	W 74–40	17–13	Cross Insurance Arena (941); Portland, ME
03/05/2017; 2:00 pm, ESPN3	(6)	vs. (2) Albany; Semifinals	L 55–57	17–14	Cross Insurance Arena (1,847); Portland, ME
*Non-conference game. ^{#}Rankings from AP Poll. (#) Tournament seedings in parentheses. All times are in Eastern Time.

== See also ==
- 2016–17 Hartford Hawks men's basketball team
