= 2016–17 Maine Black Bears women's basketball team =

Intercollegiate basketball season

2016–17 Maine Black Bears women's basketball

Hall of Fame Women's Challenge champions
- Conference: America East Conference
- Record: 18–16 (9–7 America East)
- Head coach: Richard Barron (6th season)
- Assistant coaches: Amy Vachon; Edniesha Curry; Samantha Baranowski
- Home arena: Cross Insurance Center

2016–17 America East Conference women's basketball standings
	Conf.				Overall
Team	W		L	PCT	W		L	PCT
New Hampshire	15	–	1	.938	26	–	6	.813
Albany †	12	–	4	.750	21	–	12	.636
UMBC	10	–	6	.625	15	–	16	.484
Maine	9	–	7	.563	18	–	16	.529
Binghamton	8	–	8	.500	13	–	17	.433
Hartford	7	–	9	.438	17	–	14	.548
Vermont	6	–	10	.375	9	–	20	.310
Stony Brook	5	–	11	.313	12	–	18	.400
UMass Lowell*	0	–	16	.000	3	–	26	.103
† 2017 America East tournament winner As of March 18, 2017 *ineligible for postseason play due to Div. I transitions Rankings from AP poll

The 2016–17 Maine Black Bears women's basketball team represented the University of Maine in the 2016–17 NCAA Division I women's basketball season. The Black Bears, led by sixth year head coach Richard Barron, played their home games at the Cross Insurance Center and were members of the America East Conference. They finished the season 18–16, 9–7 in America East play to finish in fifth place. They advanced to the championship game of the America East women's tournament where they lost to Albany.

== Media ==
All home games and conference road games will stream on either ESPN3 or AmericaEast.tv. Most road games will stream on the opponents website. All games will be broadcast on the radio on WGUY and online on the Maine Portal.

== Roster ==
2016–17 Maine Black Bears women's basketball team
Players
Coaches

Pos.	#	Name	Height	Year	Previous school	Hometown
G	2	Sierra Tapley	5 ft 8 in (1.73 m)	Fr	Mount Desert Island	Bar Harbor, ME
G	3	Naira Caceres	6 ft 0 in (1.83 m)	Fr	CB Islas Canarias	Las Palmas de Gran Canaria, Spain
G	4	Maddy McVicar	5 ft 4 in (1.63 m)	So	Calais	Calais, ME
F	5	Tihana Stojsavljevic	6 ft 2 in (1.88 m)	Fr	Tresnjevka	Zagreb, Croatia
G	10	Julie Brosseau	5 ft 8 in (1.73 m)	Fr	Collège Montmorency	Repentigny, QE
F	13	Laia Sole	6 ft 2 in (1.88 m)	Fr	Ine Joaquim Blume	Igualada, Spain
F	21	Sheraton Jones	5 ft 10 in (1.78 m)	Sr	Canyon	Anaheim Hills, CA
G	22	Blanca Millan	5 ft 11 in (1.8 m)	Fr	Colegio Manuel Peleteiro	Santiago de Compostela, Spain
G	23	Tanesha Sutton	5 ft 10 in (1.78 m)	RS So	Ss. Neumann and Goretti; Duquesne	Philadelphia, PA
F	31	Anita Kelava	6 ft 3 in (1.91 m)	Fr	Croatian National Team	Zagreb, Croatia
G	32	Isabel Hernandez Pope	5 ft 11 in (1.8 m)	So	Polisportiva Battipagliese	Rome, Italy
F	33	Kirsten Johnson	6 ft 2 in (1.88 m)	Jr	Academy of Our Lady Peace	San Diego, CA
G	42	Sigi Koizar	5 ft 8 in (1.73 m)	Sr	Stearns; Billrothgymnasium	Vienna, Austria
F	51	Fanny Wadling	6 ft 1 in (1.85 m)	Fr	Luleå Praktiska Gymnasium	Nacka, Sweden

Head coach

- Richard Barron (Kenyon)

Assistant coach(es)

- Amy Vachon (Maine)
- Edniesha Curry (Oregon)
- Samantha Baranowski (Maine)

Legend

- (C) Team captain
- (S) Suspended
- (I) Ineligible
- (W) Walk-on
- Injured
- Current redshirt

Roster

== Schedule ==
Date time, TV	Rank^{#}	Opponent^{#}	Result	Record	Site (attendance) city, state
Exhibition
10/30/2016*; 12:00 pm		Stonehill	W 74–54		Cross Insurance Center (1,303); Bangor, ME
Non-conference regular season
11/11/2016*; 5:00 pm, ESPN3		Purdue; Maine Tip-Off Tournament semifinals	W 67–47	1–0	Cross Insurance Center; Bangor, ME
11/12/2016*; 7:00 pm, ESPN3		No. 10 Mississippi State; Maine Tip-Off Tournament championship	L 43–87	1–1	Cross Insurance Center (2,182); Bangor, ME
11/15/2016*; 6:00 pm, NESN		at Harvard	L 62–69	1–2	Lavietes Pavilion (413); Cambridge, MA
11/20/2016*; 5:00 pm		vs. Saint Peter's; Hall of Fame Women's Challenge	W 59–43	2–2	Colonial Life Arena (11,795); Columbia, SC
11/21/2016*; 7:00 pm		at No. 3 South Carolina; Hall of Fame Women's Challenge	L 42–79	2–3	Colonial Life Arena (11,057); Columbia, SC
11/22/2016*; 5:00 pm		vs. Hampton; Hall of Fame Women's Challenge	L 49–58	2–4	Colonial Life Arena; Columbia, SC
11/27/2016*; 6:00 pm		vs. Chattanooga; Hall of Fame Women's Challenge	W 49–39	3–4	MassMutual Center (1,812); Springfield, MA
12/02/2016*; 6:00 pm		at Clemson	L 61–69	3–5	Littlejohn Coliseum (299); Clemson, SC
12/07/2016*; 7:30 pm, ESPN3		Northeastern	W 68–49	4–5	Cross Insurance Center; Bangor, ME
12/10/2016*; 1:00 pm, ESPN3		Dartmouth	W 60–55	5–5	Cross Insurance Center (1,538); Bangor, ME
12/17/2016*; 1:00 pm		at Bryant	W 77–52	6–5	Chace Athletic Center (248); Smithfield, RI
12/19/2016*; 3:00 pm		vs. East Tennessee State; Miami Holiday Tournament semifinals	W 61–48	7–5	Watsco Center; Coral Gables, FL
12/20/2016*; 5:00 pm, ACCN Extra		at No. 11 Miami (FL); Miami Holiday Tournament	L 51–76	7–6	Watsco Center (624); Coral Gables, FL
12/28/2016*; 3:00 pm		at Tulane	L 62–77	7–7	Devlin Fieldhouse (606); New Orleans, LA
12/30/2016*; 2:00 pm		at Boston College	L 53–64	7–8	Conte Forum (1,323); Chestnut Hill, MA
America East regular season
01/04/2017; 7:00 pm, AETV		at Vermont	L 52–55	7–9 (0–1)	Patrick Gym (348); Burlington, VT
01/07/2017; 12:00 pm, ESPN3		UMBC	W 72–40	8–9 (1–1)	Cross Insurance Center (1,673); Bangor, ME
01/11/2017; 7:00 pm, ESPN3		at UMass Lowell	W 65–44	9–9 (2–1)	Costello Athletic Center (184); Lowell, MA
01/14/2017; 1:00 pm, ESPN3		at Stony Brook	L 41–55	9–10 (2–2)	Island Federal Credit Union Arena (530); Stony Brook, NY
01/16/2017; 1:00 pm, ESPN3		Hartford	W 73–62	10–10 (3–2)	Cross Insurance Center (1,359); Bangor, ME
01/19/2017; 7:00 pm, ESPN3		at New Hampshire	L 44–50	10–11 (3–3)	Lundholm Gym (403); Durham, NH
01/22/2017; 1:00 pm, ESPN3		Albany	W 73–62	11–11 (4–3)	Cross Insurance Center (1,359); Bangor, ME
01/28/2017; 2:00 pm, ESPN3		at Binghamton	L 52–58	11–12 (4–4)	Binghamton University Events Center (1,355); Vestal, NY
02/01/2017; 7:00 pm, ESPN3		Vermont	W 59–43	12–12 (5–4)	Cross Insurance Center (1,193); Bangor, ME
02/04/2017; 1:00 pm, ESPN3		at UMBC	L 62–66	12–13 (5–5)	Retriever Activities Center; Catonsville, MD
02/06/2017; 7:00 pm, ESPN3		at Hartford	W 66–60	13–13 (6–5)	Chase Arena at Reich Family Pavilion (1,003); Hartford, CT
02/09/2017; 7:00 pm, ESPN3		UMass Lowell	W 76–50	14–13 (7–5)	Cross Insurance Center (1,050); Bangor, ME
02/12/2017; 1:00 pm, ESPN3		Stony Brook	W 78–71 ^{OT}	15–13 (8–5)	Cross Insurance Center (2,306); Bangor, ME
02/15/2017; 7:00 pm, ESPN3		New Hampshire	L 57–65	15–14 (8–6)	Cross Insurance Center (1,645); Bangor, ME
02/18/2017; 2:00 pm, ESPN3		at Albany	L 60–64	15–15 (8–7)	SEFCU Arena (1,543); Albany, NY
02/26/2017; 1:00 pm, ESPN3		Binghamton	W 62–49	16–15 (9–7)	Cross Insurance Center (2,372); Bangor, ME
America East Women's Tournament
03/04/2017; 2:30 pm, ESPN3	(4)	(5) Binghamton; Quarterfinals	W 57–40	17–15	Cross Insurance Arena; Portland, ME
03/05/2017; 4:30 pm, ESPN3	(4)	(1) New Hampshire; Semifinals	W 61–52	18–15	Cross Insurance Arena (1,847); Portland, ME
03/10/2017; 4:30 pm, ESPNU	(4)	at (2) Albany; Championship	L 50–66	18–16	SEFCU Arena; Albany, NY
*Non-conference game. ^{#}Rankings from AP Poll. (#) Tournament seedings in parentheses. All times are in Eastern Time.

== See also ==
- 2016–17 Maine Black Bears men's basketball team
