= 2016–17 UMass Lowell River Hawks women's basketball team =

Intercollegiate basketball season

2016–17 UMass Lowell River Hawks women's basketball
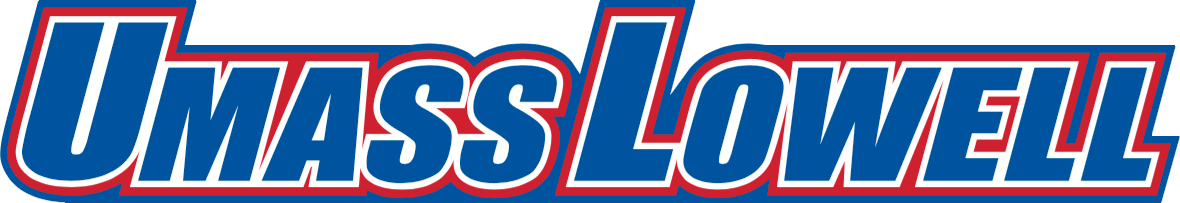
- Conference: America East Conference
- Record: 3–26 (0–16 America East)
- Head coach: Jenerrie Harris (3rd season)
- Assistant coaches: Kara Kelly; Emma Golen; Will Alton
- Home arena: Costello Athletic Center; Tsongas Center

2016–17 America East Conference women's basketball standings
| | Conf. | | | | Overall |
| Team | W | | L | PCT | W | | L | PCT |
|---|---|---|---|---|---|---|---|---|
| New Hampshire | 15 | – | 1 | .938 | 26 | – | 6 | .813 |
| Albany † | 12 | – | 4 | .750 | 21 | – | 12 | .636 |
| UMBC | 10 | – | 6 | .625 | 15 | – | 16 | .484 |
| Maine | 9 | – | 7 | .563 | 18 | – | 16 | .529 |
| Binghamton | 8 | – | 8 | .500 | 13 | – | 17 | .433 |
| Hartford | 7 | – | 9 | .438 | 17 | – | 14 | .548 |
| Vermont | 6 | – | 10 | .375 | 9 | – | 20 | .310 |
| Stony Brook | 5 | – | 11 | .313 | 12 | – | 18 | .400 |
| UMass Lowell* | 0 | – | 16 | .000 | 3 | – | 26 | .103 |
† 2017 America East tournament winner As of March 18, 2017 *ineligible for postseason play due to Div. I transitions Rankings from AP poll

The 2016–17 UMass Lowell River Hawks women's basketball team represented the University of Massachusetts Lowell during the 2016–17 NCAA Division I women's basketball season. The River Hawks were led by second-year head coach Jenerrie Harris and played most of their home games at the Costello Athletic Center while select games were played in the Tsongas Center as members of the America East Conference.

UMass Lowell was in the fourth and final year of a transition to Division I and thus ineligible for the postseason, including the America East tournament.

They finished the season 3–26, 0–16 in America East play, to finish in last place.

== Media ==
All non-televised home games and conference road games were streamed on either ESPN3 or AmericaEast.tv. Most road games were streamed on the opponents' websites.

== Roster ==
2016–17 UMass Lowell River Hawks women's basketball team
Players
Coaches

| Pos. | # | Name | Height | Year | Previous school | Hometown |
|---|---|---|---|---|---|---|
| G | 1 | Kayla Gibbs | 5 ft 11 in (1.8 m) | Jr | Teaneck | Teaneck, NJ |
| G | 2 | Amanda Oritz | 5 ft 9 in (1.75 m) | So | Newton North | Newton, MA |
| G | 3 | Megan Hendrick | 5 ft 9 in (1.75 m) | Fr | Thomas Edison | Alexandria, VA |
| G | 4 | Brianna Rudolph | 5 ft 9 in (1.75 m) | RS So | St. Mary's | Lynn, MA |
| F | 11 | Tyshay Britten | 6 ft 4 in (1.93 m) | RS Sr | Norristown Area; North Carolina Central | Norristown, PA |
| G | 12 | Asia Mitchell-Owens | 5 ft 8 in (1.73 m) | Sr | Oliver Ames | Roxbury, MA |
| G | 13 | Markayla Sherman | 5 ft 3 in (1.6 m) | Fr | Princeton | Cincinnati, OH |
| G | 14 | Felicia Korte | 5 ft 11 in (1.8 m) | Fr | Watertown | Watertown, MA |
| F | 15 | Kiana Batagelj | 5 ft 10 in (1.78 m) | Jr | Williamsburg Christian Academy; Hillsborough CC | Hamilton, ON |
| F | 21 | Oda Shackelford | 6 ft 2 in (1.88 m) | So | Southwestern | Edinburgh, IN |
| G | 22 | Nazarae Butler | 5 ft 8 in (1.73 m) | RS Fr | Columbus Africentric | Columbus, OH |
| G | 23 | Shawnkia McCallum | 5 ft 9 in (1.75 m) | Fr | St. Frances Academy | Perry Hall, MD |
| F | 32 | Lauren Parra | 6 ft 1 in (1.85 m) | Sr | St. John the Baptist | Islip, NY |
| G | 34 | Nicole Hayner | 5 ft 9 in (1.75 m) | Sr | Bishop Guertin | Bedford, NH |
| F | 50 | Kathrine Smith | 6 ft 2 in (1.88 m) | So | Canterbury | Fort Wayne, IN |

Head coach

- Jenerrie Harris (Kentucky)

Assistant coach(es)

- Kara Kelly (Assumption (MA))
- Emma Golen (Harvard)
- Will Alton (Penn State)

Legend

- (C) Team captain
- (S) Suspended
- (I) Ineligible
- (W) Walk-on
- Injured
- Current redshirt

Roster
Last update: June 4, 2024

== Schedule ==
| Date time, TV | Rank^{#} | Opponent^{#} | Result | Record | Site (attendance) city, state |
Non-conference regular season
| 11/11/2016*; 7:00 p.m. | | at Towson | L 56–90 | 0–1 | SECU Arena (350); Towson, MD |
| 11/13/2016*; 1:00 p.m. | | at Maryland | L 44–100 | 0–2 | Xfinity Center (3,958); College Park, MD |
| 11/17/2016*; 7:00 p.m., ESPN3 | | Fairfield | L 41–65 | 0–3 | Costello Athletic Center (352); Lowell, MA |
| 11/20/2016*; 2:00 p.m., ESPN3 | | Longwood | L 59–72 | 0–4 | Tsongas Center (529); Lowell, MA |
| 11/23/2016*; 2:00 p.m. | | at Indiana | L 45–79 | 0–5 | Simon Skjodt Assembly Hall (2,670); Bloomington, IN |
| 11/26/2016*; 2:00 p.m. | | at Boston University | L 56–66 | 0–6 | Case Gym (166); Boston, MA |
| 11/29/2016*; 7:00 p.m., ESPN3 | | Rhode Island | L 57–64 | 0–7 | Costello Athletic Center (521); Lowell, MA |
| 12/02/2016*; 11:00 a.m. | | at Columbia | L 57–76 | 0–8 | Levien Gymnasium (2,271); New York City, NY |
| 12/05/2016*; 7:00 p.m., ESPN3 | | Fairleigh Dickinson | W 61–55 | 1–8 | Costello Athletic Center (589); Lowell, MA |
| 12/10/2016*; 1:00 p.m. | | at Holy Cross | L 47–62 | 1–9 | Hart Center (921); Worcester, MA |
| 12/18/2016*; 1:00 p.m., ESPN3 | | Colgate | W 82–77 ^{OT} | 2–9 | Tsongas Center (353); Lowell, MA |
| 12/21/2016*; 4:00 p.m. | | at Bryant | L 62–73 | 2–10 | Chace Athletic Center (105); Smithfield, RI |
| 12/30/2016*; 1:00 p.m., ESPN3 | | Keene State | W 74–48 | 3–10 | Costello Athletic Center (254); Lowell, MA |
America East regular season
| 01/04/2017; 7:00 p.m. | | at Albany | L 69–93 | 3–11 (0–1) | SEFCU Arena (1,103); Albany, NY |
| 01/07/2017; 2:00 p.m., ESPN3 | | Binghamton | L 48–58 | 3–12 (0–2) | Costello Athletic Center (207); Lowell, MA |
| 01/11/2017; 7:00 p.m., ESPN3 | | Maine | L 44–65 | 3–13 (0–3) | Costello Athletic Center (184); Lowell, MA |
| 01/14/2017; 2:00 p.m. | | at Hartford | L 59–80 | 3–14 (0–4) | Chase Arena at Reich Family Pavilion (948); Hartford, CT |
| 01/16/2017; 2:00 p.m. | | at Stony Brook | L 53–83 | 3–15 (0–5) | Island Federal Credit Union Arena (554); Stony Brook, NY |
| 01/19/2017; 7:00 p.m., ESPN3 | | Vermont | L 46–61 | 3–16 (0–6) | Costello Athletic Center (204); Lowell, MA |
| 01/22/2017; 1:00 p.m. | | at UMBC | L 72–79 | 3–17 (0–7) | Retriever Activities Center (275); Catonsville, MD |
| 01/25/2017; 11:00 a.m., ESPN3 | | New Hampshire | L 57–76 | 3–18 (0–8) | Tsongas Center (4,192); Lowell, MA |
| 02/01/2017; 7:00 p.m., ESPN3 | | Albany | L 60–79 | 3–19 (0–9) | Costello Athletic Center (611); Lowell, MA |
| 02/04/2017; 4:00 p.m. | | at Binghamton | L 54–69 | 3–20 (0–10) | Binghamton University Events Center (1,609); Vestal, NY |
| 02/06/2017; 7:00 p.m., ESPN3 | | Stony Brook | L 44–86 | 3–21 (0–11) | Costello Athletic Center (202); Lowell, MA |
| 02/09/2017; 7:00 p.m. | | at Maine | L 50–76 | 3–22 (0–12) | Cross Insurance Center (1,050); Bangor, ME |
| 02/12/2017; 2:00 p.m., ESPN3 | | Hartford | L 64–84 | 3–23 (0–13) | Tsongas Center (803); Lowell, MA |
| 02/15/2017; 7:00 p.m. | | at Vermont | L 36–60 | 3–24 (0–14) | Patrick Gym (431); Burlington, VT |
| 02/18/2017; 1:00 p.m., ESPN3 | | UMBC | L 62–78 | 3–25 (0–15) | Tsongas Center (2,291); Lowell, MA |
| 02/23/2017; 7:00 p.m. | | at New Hampshire | L 45–58 | 3–26 (0–16) | Lundholm Gym (565); Durham, NH |
*Non-conference game. ^{#}Rankings from AP poll. (#) Tournament seedings in parentheses. All times are in Eastern.

== See also ==
- 2016–17 UMass Lowell River Hawks men's basketball team
