= 2016–17 Albany Great Danes women's basketball team =

Intercollegiate basketball season

2016–17 Albany Great Danes women's basketball

America East tournament champions

NCAA women's tournament, first round
- Conference: America East Conference
- Record: 21–12 (12–4 America East)
- Head coach: Joanna Bernabei-McNamee (1st season)
- Assistant coaches: Yolanda Griffith; AJ Cohen; Tony Perotti
- Home arena: SEFCU Arena

2016–17 America East Conference women's basketball standings
	Conf.				Overall
Team	W		L	PCT	W		L	PCT
New Hampshire	15	–	1	.938	26	–	6	.813
Albany †	12	–	4	.750	21	–	12	.636
UMBC	10	–	6	.625	15	–	16	.484
Maine	9	–	7	.563	18	–	16	.529
Binghamton	8	–	8	.500	13	–	17	.433
Hartford	7	–	9	.438	17	–	14	.548
Vermont	6	–	10	.375	9	–	20	.310
Stony Brook	5	–	11	.313	12	–	18	.400
UMass Lowell*	0	–	16	.000	3	–	26	.103
† 2017 America East tournament winner As of March 18, 2017 *ineligible for postseason play due to Div. I transitions Rankings from AP poll

The 2016–17 Albany Great Danes women's basketball team represented the University at Albany, SUNY during the 2016–17 NCAA Division I women's basketball season. The Great Danes, led by first-year head coach Joanna Bernabei-McNamee, played their home games at SEFCU Arena in Albany, New York and were members of the America East Conference. They finished the season 21–12, 12–4 in America East play, to finish in second place. They defeated Vermont, Hartford, and Maine to win America East women's tournament for the sixth straight year. They received an automatic bid of the NCAA women's tournament, where they lost to UConn in the first round.

== Media ==
All home games and conference road games streamed on either ESPN3 on AmericaEast.tv. Most road games streamed on the opponents' websites. Selected games were broadcast on the radio on WCDB.

== Roster ==
2016–17 Albany Great Danes women's basketball team
Players
Coaches

Pos.	#	Name	Height	Year	Previous school	Hometown
G	00	Mackenzie Trpcic	5 ft 6 in (1.68 m)	Fr	St. Mary's	Hamilton, ON
G	2	Aubrey Hernandez	5 ft 6 in (1.68 m)	RS Sr	Loudonville Christian; Hudson Valley CC	Troy, NY
G	3	Khepera Stokes	5 ft 6 in (1.68 m)	RS Fr	Baltimore Polytechnic Institute	Baltimore, MD
G/F	10	Bailey Hixson	6 ft 1 in (1.85 m)	Sr	Manchester-Shortsville; Monroe CC	Shortsville, NY
G	12	Imani Tate	5 ft 8 in (1.73 m)	Sr	Bishop Loughlin	The Bronx, NY
F	13	Bose Aiyalogbe	6 ft 0 in (1.83 m)	RS Jr	Life Center Academy	Lagos, Nigeria
G/F	15	Jessica Féquière	5 ft 11 in (1.8 m)	RS Jr	Champlain College Saint-Lambert	Montreal, QC
G	20	Kumsal Aslan	5 ft 8 in (1.73 m)	Fr	St. Timothy's School	Ankara, Turkey
F	22	Heather Forster	6 ft 2 in (1.88 m)	So	Huntington	Huntington, NY
C	24	Alexi Schecter	6 ft 3 in (1.91 m)	Fr	Lowell	Lowell, MA
F/C	33	Tiana-Jo Carter	6 ft 2 in (1.88 m)	Jr	Lake Region	Naples, ME
G	34	Cassandra Edwards	5 ft 10 in (1.78 m)	So	Notre Dame CSS	Brampton, ON
F	44	Chyanna Canada	6 ft 2 in (1.88 m)	So	Nottingham	Syracuse, NY

Head coach

- Joanna Bernabei-McNamee (West Liberty)

Assistant coach(es)

- Yolanda Griffith (Florida Atlantic)
- AJ Cohen (Louisville)
- Tony Perotti (Tennessee)

Legend

- (C) Team captain
- (S) Suspended
- (I) Ineligible
- (W) Walk-on
- Injured
- Current redshirt

Roster
Last update: August 23, 2024

== Schedule ==
Date time, TV	Rank^{#}	Opponent^{#}	Result	Record	Site (attendance) city, state
Non-conference regular season
November 12, 2016*; 7:00 p.m.		at No. 19 Kentucky; Kentucky Classic	L 46–70	0–1	Memorial Coliseum (4,667); Lexington, KY
November 13, 2016*; 7:00 p.m.		vs. No. 14 Miami (FL); Kentucky Classic	L 53–77	0–2	Memorial Coliseum (150); Lexington, KY
November 16, 2016*; 5:30 p.m., AETV		Army	W 65–59	1–2	SEFCU Arena; Albany, NY
November 19, 2016*; 7:00 p.m., AETV		Boston University	W 69–54	2–2	SEFCU Arena (1,119); Albany, NY
November 22, 2016*; 7:00 p.m.		at Fordham	L 82–89 ^{2OT}	2–3	Rose Hill Gymnasium (381); The Bronx, NY
November 27, 2016*; 3:00 p.m., AETV		Siena	W 88–86 ^{OT}	3–3	SEFCU Arena (2,082); Albany, NY
November 30, 2016*; 7:00 p.m., ESPN3		at St. John's	L 36–54	3–4	Carnesecca Arena (529); Queens, NY
December 3, 2016*; 2:00 p.m.		at Yale	L 53–64 ^{OT}	3–5	John J. Lee Amphitheater (407); New Haven, CT
December 6, 2016*; 7:00 p.m., ESPN3		Fairfield	W 59–45	4–5	SEFCU Arena (1,008); Albany, NY
December 10, 2016*; 1:00 p.m.		at Wagner	W 75–50	5–5	Spiro Sports Center (232); Staten Island, NY
December 12, 2016*; 7:00 p.m., ESPN3		Post	W 85–61	6–5	SEFCU Arena (1,002); Albany, NY
December 18, 2016*; 1:00 p.m.		at St. Bonaventure	L 59–67	6–6	Reilly Center (742); Olean, NY
December 29, 2016*; 7:00 p.m.		at Dartmouth	L 61–69 ^{OT}	6–7	Leede Arena (213); Hanover, NH
American East regular season
January 4, 2017; 7:00 p.m., ESPN3		UMass Lowell	W 93–67	7–7 (1–0)	SEFCU Arena (1,103); Albany, NY
January 7, 2017; 2:00 p.m., ESPN3		Stony Brook	W 64–54	8–7 (2–0)	SEFCU Arena (1,158); Albany, NY
January 11, 2017; 7:00 p.m., ESPN3		at New Hampshire	L 58–71	8–8 (2–1)	Lundholm Gym (268); Durham, NC
January 16, 2017; 7:00 p.m., ESPN3		UMBC	L 56–64	8–9 (2–2)	SECU Arena (956); Albany, NY
January 19, 2017; 7:00 p.m., ESPN3		at Binghamton	W 67–61	9–9 (3–2)	Binghamton University Events Center (1,435); Binghamton, NY
January 22, 2017; 1:00 p.m., ESPN3		at Maine	L 62–73	9–10 (3–3)	Cross Insurance Center (1,359); Bangor, ME
January 26, 2017; 12:00 p.m., ESPN3		Vermont	W 64–53	10–10 (4–3)	SECU Arena (1,742); Albany, NY
January 28, 2017; 7:00 p.m., ESPN3		Hartford	W 82–71	11–10 (5–3)	SECU Arena (1,876); Albany, NY
February 1, 2017; 7:00 p.m., ESPN3		at UMass Lowell	W 79–60	12–10 (6–3)	Costello Athletic Center (611); Lowell, MA
February 4, 2017; 2:00 p.m., ESPN3		at Stony Brook	W 75–57	13–10 (7–3)	Island Federal Credit Union Arena (1,262); Stony Brook, NY
February 6, 2017; 7:00 p.m., ESPN3		New Hampshire	W 64–55	14–10 (8–3)	SEFCU Arena (1,076); Albany, NY
February 9, 2017; 7:00 p.m., ESPN3		Binghamton	W 80–63	15–10 (9–3)	SECU Arena (1,271); Albany, NY
February 15, 2017; 7:00 p.m., ESPN3		at UMBC	L 60–63	15–11 (9–4)	Retriever Activities Center (555); Catonsville, MD
February 18, 2017; 2:00 p.m., ESPN3		Maine	W 64–60	16–11 (10–4)	SECU Arena (1,543); Albany, NY
February 23, 2017; 7:00 p.m., ESPN3		at Vermont	W 67–52	17–11 (11–4)	Patrick Gym (426); Burlington, VT
February 26, 2017; 2:00 p.m., ESPN3		at Hartford	W 58–52	18–11 (12–4)	Chase Arena at Reich Family Pavilion (1,524); Hartford, CT
America East women's tournament
March 4, 2017; 6:00 p.m., ESPN3		vs. Vermont; Quarterfinals	W 65–45	19–11	Cross Insurance Arena; Portland, ME
March 5, 2017; 4:30 p.m., ESPN3		vs. Hartford; Semifinals	W 57–55	20–11	Cross Insurance Arena (1,847); Portland, ME
March 10, 2017; 4:30 p.m., ESPNU		Maine; Championship game	W 66–50	21–11	SECU Arena (1,231); Albany, NY
NCAA women's tournament
March 18, 2017*; 11:00 a.m., ESPN2	(16 B)	at (1 B) No. 1 Connecticut; First round	L 55–116	21–12	Gampel Pavilion (5,670); Storrs, CT
*Non-conference game. ^{#}Rankings from AP poll. (#) Tournament seedings in parentheses. B=Bridgeport Region. All times are in Eastern.

== Rankings ==
Regular-season polls
Poll	Pre- season	Week 2	Week 3	Week 4	Week 5	Week 6	Week 7	Week 8	Week 9	Week 10	Week 11	Week 12	Week 13	Week 14	Week 15	Week 16	Week 17	Week 18	Week 19	Final
AP																				N/A
Coaches																				

Legend
	Increase in ranking
	Decrease in ranking
	No change
(RV)	Received votes
(NR)	Not ranked

== See also ==
- 2016–17 Albany Great Danes men's basketball team
