= Joanna Bernabei-McNamee =

American basketball coach

Biographical details
- Born: 1975 (age 50–51); Weirton, West Virginia, U.S.
- Education: West Liberty University; Eastern Kentucky University

Playing career
- 1993–1997: West Liberty State
- Position: Point guard

Coaching career (HC unless noted)
- 1997–1998: Eastern Kentucky (asst.)
- 1998–1999: West Virginia Wesleyan
- 1999–2001: Eastern Kentucky (asst.)
- 2001–2003: West Virginia (asst.)
- 2003–2007: Maryland (asst.)
- 2008–2009: West Virginia (asst.)
- 2013–2016: Pikeville
- 2016–2018: Albany
- 2018–2026: Boston College

Administrative career (AD unless noted)
- 1998–1999: West Virginia Wesleyan (women's AD)

Head coaching record
- Overall: 238–197 (.547)
- Tournaments: 0–1 (NCAA); 2–2 (WNIT); 0–1 (WBIT); 3–1 (NAIA D-I)

Accomplishments and honors

Awards
- WBCA NAIA Regional Coach of the Year (2016); Mid-South Coach of the Year (2015); ACC Coach of the Year (2019)

Joanna Lynn Bernabei-McNamee (born 1975) is an American college basketball coach who was most recently head women's basketball coach at Boston College.

== Early life and education ==
Born Joanna Lynn Bernabei in Weirton, West Virginia, Bernabei-McNamee graduated from Weirton Madonna High School in 1993. She helped Weirton Madonna win a girls' basketball state championship and also lettered in tennis and track at the school.

After high school, she enrolled at West Liberty State College. A point guard, Bernabei-McNamee was a four-year all-WVIAC honoree and reached both 1,000 points and 1,000 assists plus over 500 rebounds in her collegiate career. In 1997, she graduated from West Liberty State with a bachelor's degree in exercise physiology.

=== West Liberty State College statistics ===
Legend
GP	Games played	GS	Games started	MPG	Minutes per game
FG%	Field goal percentage	3P%	3-point field goal percentage	FT%	Free throw percentage
RPG	Rebounds per game	APG	Assists per game	SPG	Steals per game
BPG	Blocks per game	PPG	Points per game	**Bold**	Career high

Year	Team	GP	Points	FG%	3P%	FT%	RPG	APG	SPG	BPG	PPG
1993–94	West Liberty State	27	307	40.4%	24.0%	73.5%	**4.8**	8.9	4.0	0.1	11.4
1994–95	West Liberty State	**30**	346	39.2%	31.7%	**77.1%**	4.3	9.3	1.9	0.1	11.5
1995–96	West Liberty State	**30**	313	38.8%	38.4%	64.5%	3.6	9.8	2.3	0.2	10.4
1996–97	West Liberty State	29	**351**	**42.3%**	**40.5%**	74.7%	4.5	**10.2**	**2.9**	**0.3**	**12.1**
Career		116	1317	40.1%	34.7%	73.0%	4.3	9.5	2.8	0.2	11.4

== Coaching career ==
Bernabei-McNamee began her coaching career at Eastern Kentucky in 1997 under Larry Joe Inman. She also completed a master's degree in sports administration at Eastern Kentucky in 1998.

In 1998, Bernabei-McNamee became head women's basketball coach and senior women's athletics administrator at Division II West Virginia Wesleyan College. At the time, she was the youngest college head coach in the U.S. Under Bernabei-McNamee, West Virginia Wesleyan went 18–10 (15–6 WVIAC). Bernabei-McNamee then spent the next two years back on Inman's staff at Eastern Kentucky.

Bernabei-McNamee joined Mike Carey's staff as assistant coach at West Virginia in 2001. Two years later, she became an assistant at Maryland under Brenda Frese and was part of the Maryland team that won the 2006 NCAA tournament. For the 2008–09 season, Bernabei-McNamee rejoined Carey at West Virginia as assistant coach.

In 2013, Bernabei-McNamee became head coach at the University of Pikeville, an NAIA school. In three seasons, she went 63–26 at Pikeville, including a 26–9 record and Final Four appearance in 2015–16.

On April 15, 2016, Albany hired Bernabei-McNamee to be women's basketball head coach.

== Personal life ==
In 2004, Joanna Bernabei married Joseph McNamee. They have two children. From 2007 to 2008 and 2009 to 2013, she was a stay-at-home parent.

== Head coaching record ==
Record table
Season	Team	Overall	Conference	Standing	Postseason
West Virginia Wesleyan Bobcats (West Virginia Intercollegiate Athletic Conference) (1998–1999)
1998–99	West Virginia Wesleyan	18–10	15–6	3rd	
West Virginia Wesleyan:		18–10 (.643)	15–6 (.714)		
Pikeville Bears (Mid-South Conference) (2013–2016)
2013–14	Pikeville	14–18	7–11	T–6th	
2014–15	Pikeville	23–8	8–6	T–3rd	
2015–16	Pikeville	26–9	7–7	5th	NAIA D-I Final Four
Pikeville:		63–35 (.643)	22–24 (.478)		
Albany Great Danes (America East) (2016–2018)
2016–17	Albany	21–12	12–4	2nd	NCAA first round
2017–18	Albany	24–8	12–4	2nd	WNIT First Round
Albany:		45–20 (.692)	24–8 (.750)		
Boston College Eagles (Atlantic Coast Conference) (2018–2026)
2018–19	Boston College	14–16	3–13	13th	
2019–20	Boston College	20–12	11–7	T–4th	
2020–21	Boston College	7–12	2–11	13th	
2021–22	Boston College	21–12	10–8	T–7th	WNIT Third Round
2022–23	Boston College	16–17	5–13	T–11th	
2023–24	Boston College	14–19	5–13	T–12th	
2024–25	Boston College	16–18	6–12	T–12th	WBIT First Round
2025–26	Boston College	5–26	1–17	T–17th	
Boston College:		113–132 (.461)	43–94 (.314)		
Total:		238–197 (.547)			
National champion Postseason invitational champion Conference regular season champion Conference regular season and conference tournament champion Division regular season champion Division regular season and conference tournament champion Conference tournament champion
