= Chris Day (basketball) =

Basketball coach

Current position
- Title: Assistant coach
- Team: La Salle
- Conference: Atlantic 10

Biographical details
- Education: West Chester

Coaching career (HC unless noted)
- 1995–1999: Archbishop Carroll (PA) (asst.)
- 1999–2000: Widener (asst.)
- 2000–2003: Widener
- 2003–2004: Duquesne (asst.)
- 2004–2005: La Salle (asst.)
- 2005–2012: Saint Joseph's (asst.)
- 2012–2013: Indiana (asst.)
- 2013–2016: Penn (asst.)
- 2016–2018: Vermont
- 2018–present: La Salle (asst.)

Head coaching record
- Overall: 40–65 (.381)

Chris Day is a women's college basketball coach, and former head coach of the University of Vermont women's basketball team. Currently, he is an assistant coach at La Salle.

== College career ==
Day was a two-sport athlete at West Chester University, where he competed in football and track and field. He was a member of two of West Chester's Pennsylvania State Athletic Conference titles in 1992 and 1994, and was an all-conference sprinter earning ECAC and PSAC honors after setting a conference record in the 200-meter and 400-meter dashes.

== Coaching career ==
Day began his coaching career at his high school alma mater Archbishop John Carroll High School, serving as an assistant girls varsity coach and head junior varsity coach. He then moved into the college ranks to become an assistant football coach at Widener University from 1998 to 2002, and an assistant on the women's basketball team starting in 1999. In 2000, Day was elevated to head women's basketball coach at Widener, compiling a 31–44 overall record in three seasons, leading the Pioneers to its first winning record in 17 seasons.

In 2003, Day accepted an assistant coaching position on the women's basketball staff at Duquesne, and would have subsequent assistant coaching stops at La Salle, Saint Joseph's, Indiana, and Penn.

On May 11, 2016, Day was named 8th head women's basketball coach at Vermont, replacing Lori Gear McBride. On April 2, 2018, Vermont announced it was "reviewing certain aspects of the women’s basketball program" focused on Day's verbal interactions with players. On April 26, 2018, Day resigned from his position as head coach of the Catamounts after two seasons and would be replaced by assistant coach Alisa Kresge on an interim basis for the 2018–19 season. Upon taking an assistant coaching position at La Salle on May 8, 2018, the Burlington Free Press reported that Day will receive $142,800 in severance pay, and the investigation into his conduct was "discontinued, and no report has been or will be issued." according to a University of Vermont spokesperson.

== Personal life ==
Day and his wife have five children. His father-in-law is former NBA referee Joey Crawford.

== Head coaching record ==
=== NCAA DIII ===
Record table
Season	Team	Overall	Conference	Standing	Postseason
Widener (MAC Commonwealth Conference) (2000–2003)
2000–01	Widener	7–17	3–11	N/A	
2001–02	Widener	10–15	4–10	N/A	
2002–03	Widener	14–12	6–8	5th	
Widener:		31–44 (.413)	13–29 (.310)		
Total:		31–44 (.413)			
National champion Postseason invitational champion Conference regular season champion Conference regular season and conference tournament champion Division regular season champion Division regular season and conference tournament champion Conference tournament champion

=== NCAA DI ===
Record table
Season	Team	Overall	Conference	Standing	Postseason
Vermont (America East Conference) (2016–2018)
2016–17	Vermont	9–20	6–10	7th	
2017–18	Vermont	8–22	5–11	7th	
Vermont:		17–42 (.288)	11–21 (.344)		
Total:		17–42 (.288)			
National champion Postseason invitational champion Conference regular season champion Conference regular season and conference tournament champion Division regular season champion Division regular season and conference tournament champion Conference tournament champion
