= Marysville, Michigan =

- City
- City of Marysville
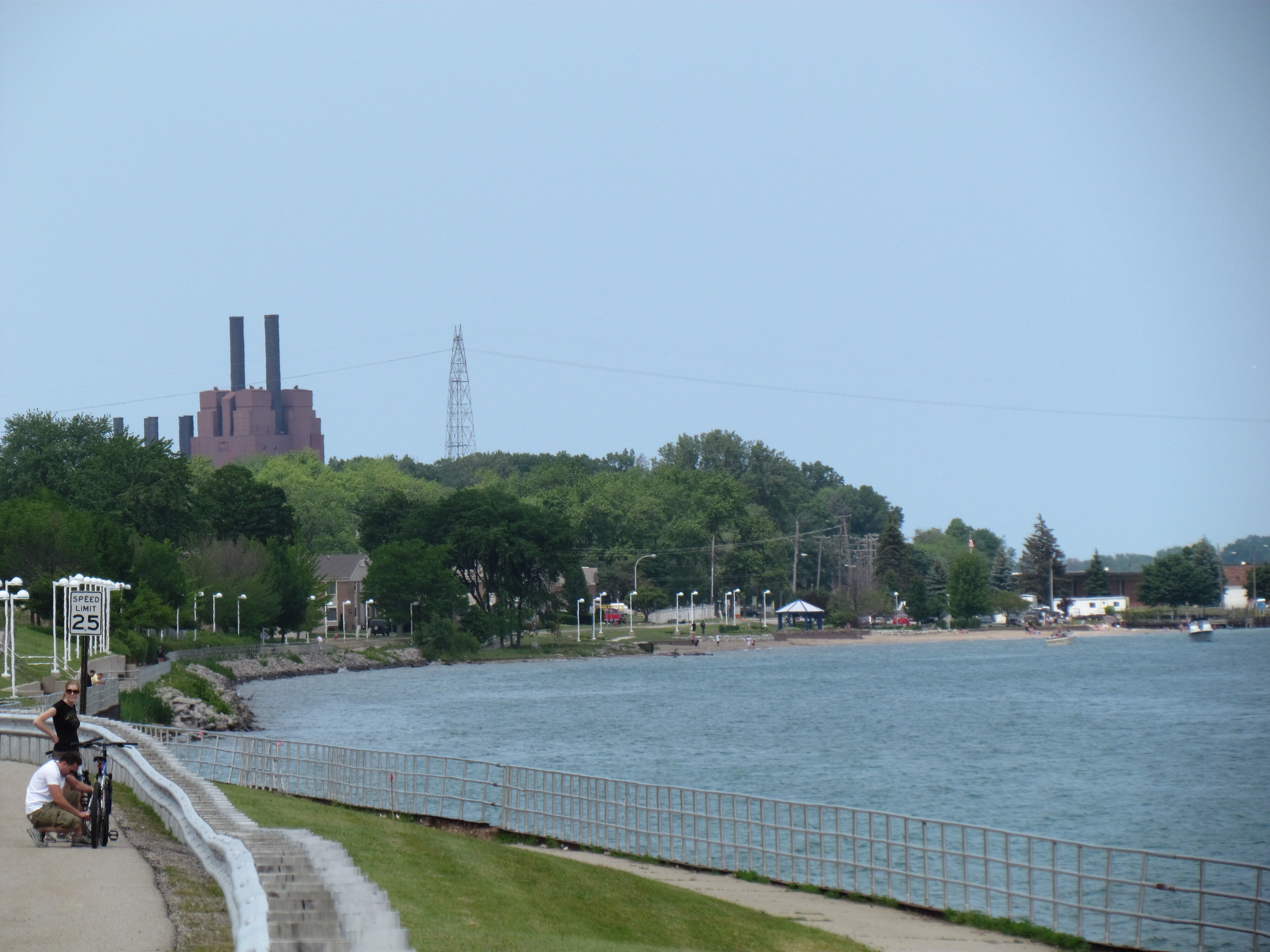
- Riverfront along the St. Clair River
- Motto: City of Contented Living
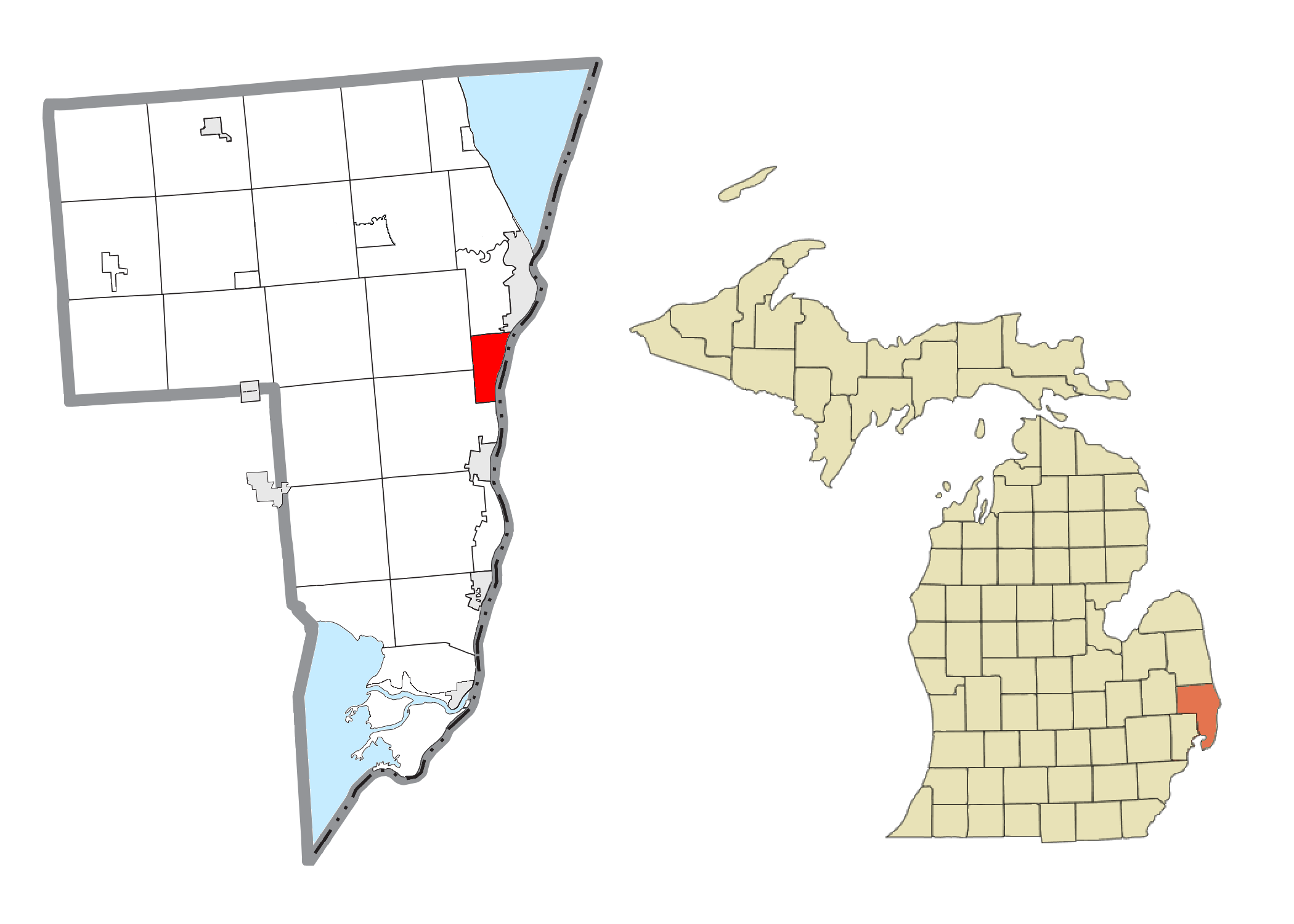
- Location within St. Clair County

- Location within the state of Michigan Location within the United States
- Coordinates: 42°54′37″N 82°28′47″W
- Country: United States
- State: Michigan
- County: St. Clair
- Settled: 1843
- Incorporated: 1921 (village); 1924 (city)

Government
  - Type: Council–manager
  - Mayor: Kathy Hayman
  - Clerk: Rene Stoia
  - Manager: Quentin Bishop

Area
  - Total: 8.32 sq mi (21.54 km^{2})
  - Land: 7.33 sq mi (18.98 km^{2})
  - Water: 0.99 sq mi (2.56 km^{2})
- Elevation: 610 ft (186 m)

Population (2020)
  - Total: 9,997
  - Density: 1,363.85/sq mi (526.59/km^{2})
- Time zone: UTC-5 (Eastern (EST))
  - Summer (DST): UTC-4 (EDT)
- ZIP code(s): 48040
- Area code: 810
- FIPS code: 26-52080
- GNIS feature ID: 1624715
- Website: Official website

Marysville is a city in St. Clair County of the U.S. state of Michigan. As of the 2020 census, Marysville had a population of 9,997. The municipality was founded in 1919, first as a village, then became a city in 1924.

Marysville is located on the western shore of the St. Clair River, across from Corunna, Ontario. The city is marked by winding streets, subdivisions, a riverfront boardwalk, Bridge-to-Bay Bike Trail and an industrial park. The city was home to the former Wills Sainte Claire Automotive company, a Morton Salt plant, and the Detroit Edison Marysville Power Plant which was decommissioned in 2001 and razed in 2015.

== Geography ==
- According to the United States Census Bureau, the city has a total area of 8.30 square miles (21.50 km^{2}), of which 7.31 square miles (18.93 km^{2}) is land and 0.99 square miles (2.56 km^{2}) is water.
- It is considered to be part of the Thumb of Michigan.
  - Marysville can also be considered as in the Blue Water Area.
- The city lies on the border between Michigan and Ontario formed by the St. Clair River
- Marysville is neighbored by Port Huron, Michigan to the north, St. Clair, Michigan to the south, Kimball Township, Michigan to the west, and Corunna, Ontario to the east.

== History ==
Marysville traces its history back to 1786 when Antoin Morass built a sawmill at Bunce Creek. Later, in 1817, Zephaniah W. Bunce sailed up the St. Clair River and settled at the place of the mill, naming it Bunce Creek. This would later become the property of the Detroit Edison Marysville Power Plant. He later became postmaster and a member of the Michigan Territorial Council.

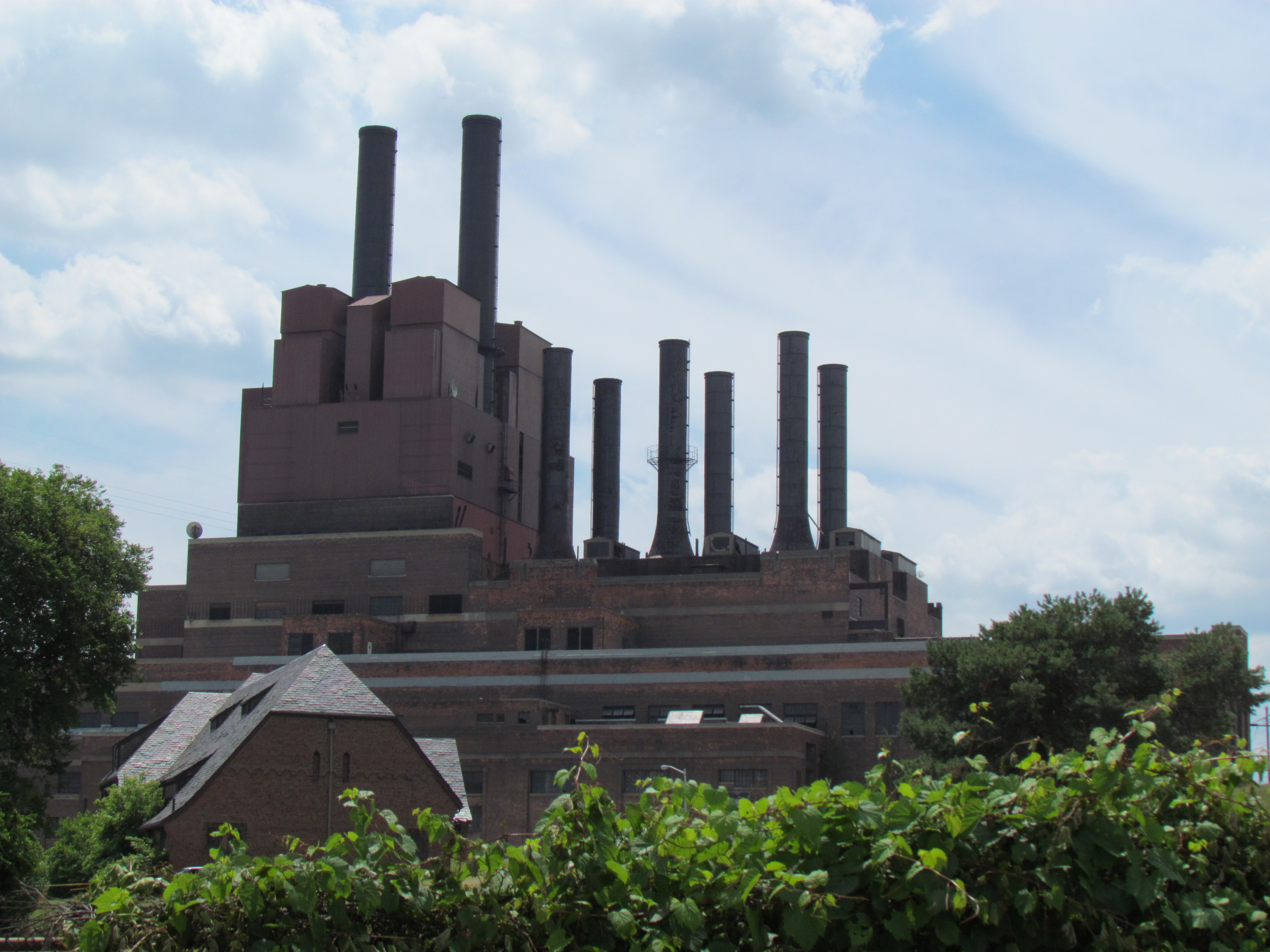
The Marysville Power Plant was the site of Zephaniah Bunce's settlement.

In 1788, George Meldrum and William Park, of the Detroit firm Meldrum and Park, acquired land along Cuttle Creek (previously known as Meldrum Creek). In 1792, the firm erected the first mill in that location. The settlement was located in the southern part of current day Marysville where Meldrum Street is named in reference to him.

Also having a street named for him was Colonel Andrew Mack, a native and the 11th mayor of Detroit. He bought Meldrum and Park's mill and built his home and a general store along the St. Clair River. The small settlement with Mack's general store and mill was called "Mack's Place" and was awarded a post office. Mack was a state representative, Colonel in the War of 1812, and a co-founder of the Detroit Free Press. Colonel Mack and his wife, Amelia, are buried on the north bank of Cuttle Creek in the Riverview Golf Course.

Later, Edward P. Vickery settled at the present day foot of Huron Boulevard in Marysville. He named the operation Vickery's Landing and the settlement surrounding it eventually became known as Vicksburg. In 1854, the Mack's Place post office was transferred to Vicksburg. However, there was already another Vicksburg, Michigan, so in 1859 the name was changed to Marysville, after Nelson Mill's wife Mary.

These small settlements were brought together by inventor and engineer, C. Harold Wills. He worked at the Ford Motor Company, and was considered the "right-hand man" of Henry Ford. His contributions to the Ford company included designing Models A through T of the early Ford Motor Company. He was the inventor of many auto improvements including the planetary transmission used in the Models S and T. He was a pioneer in the use of vanadium steel and designed the "Blue Oval" logo, still used on Ford Products today. He resigned in 1919 and moved to Marysville to establish the C. H. Wills & Company on the banks of the St. Clair River. Two years later in 1921, the first Wills Ste. Clair automobile was produced (named for the factory's location on the St. Clair River). The factory closed in 1926 after 14,000 vehicles were made by the Wills factory.

Wills' and his partner John Lee provided much of the early infrastructure of Marysville, including electricity, sidewalks, roads, etc. so that Wills is credited with the street design and city planning of Marysville. He nicknamed Marysville the "Dream City". The main area of the city to be developed before his company folded was the area surrounding Washington Elementary School. The community was deeply affected by the Great Depression, and the vision for the city was never fully realized. Subdivision development in the later half of the 20th century has further offset the strategic plan for the City of Marysville. Wills did succeed to the extent that the Marysville area is nowadays a vibrant community. Wills' former factory currently houses the Chrysler Corporation MOPAR parts distribution facility.

Marysville was incorporated as a village in 1919. It became an incorporated city in 1924.

== Present Day ==
Today, Marysville is a growing community, lacking a central downtown area. Most of the retail and restaurants are located along Gratiot Blvd. and Michigan Avenue. The city's administrative office and police and fire departments are located on Delaware Ave. The large industrial area is located in the southern half of the city along M-29, which snakes through Marysville. The city park and the older residential neighborhoods are along Huron Boulevard, as well as an area located off of M-29 near Gratiot Boulevard, known as the 'Salt Block', which had originally been constructed to house workers of Morton Salt Company.

== Demographics ==
Historical population
Census	Pop.	Note	%±
1920	941		—
1930	1,405		49.3%
1940	1,777		26.5%
1950	2,534		42.6%
1960	4,065		60.4%
1970	5,610		38.0%
1980	7,345		30.9%
1990	8,515		15.9%
2000	9,684		13.7%
2010	9,959		2.8%
2020	9,997		0.4%
U.S. Decennial Census

=== 2020 census ===
As of the 2020 census, Marysville had a population of 9,997. The median age was 43.6 years. 21.9% of residents were under the age of 18 and 21.4% of residents were 65 years of age or older. For every 100 females there were 90.1 males, and for every 100 females age 18 and over there were 87.1 males age 18 and over.

100.0% of residents lived in urban areas, while 0.0% lived in rural areas.

There were 4,283 households in Marysville, of which 27.0% had children under the age of 18 living in them. Of all households, 47.8% were married-couple households, 16.1% were households with a male householder and no spouse or partner present, and 29.8% were households with a female householder and no spouse or partner present. About 32.1% of all households were made up of individuals and 17.3% had someone living alone who was 65 years of age or older.

There were 4,535 housing units, of which 5.6% were vacant. The homeowner vacancy rate was 1.0% and the rental vacancy rate was 8.8%.

Racial composition as of the 2020 census
Race	Number	Percent
White	9,314	93.2%
Black or African American	73	0.7%
American Indian and Alaska Native	30	0.3%
Asian	76	0.8%
Native Hawaiian and Other Pacific Islander	1	0.0%
Some other race	61	0.6%
Two or more races	442	4.4%
Hispanic or Latino (of any race)	302	3.0%

=== 2010 census ===
As of the census of 2010, there were 9,959 people, 4,160 households, and 2,738 families residing in the city. The population density was 1,362.4 inhabitants per square mile (526.0/km^{2}). There were 4,515 housing units at an average density of 617.6 units per square mile (238.5 units/km^{2}). The racial makeup of the city was 97.5% White, 0.3% African American, 0.2% Native American, 0.6% Asian, 0.4% from other races, and 0.9% from two or more races. Hispanic or Latino of any race were 1.8% of the population.

There were 4,160 households, of which 29.8% had children under the age of 18 living with them, 53.1% were married couples living together, 9.1% had a female householder with no husband present, 3.6% had a male householder with no wife present, and 34.2% were non-families. 30.3% of all households were made up of individuals, and 14.7% had someone living alone who was 65 years of age or older. The average household size was 2.39 and the average family size was 2.99.

The median age in the city was 42 years. 23.4% of residents were under the age of 18; 7% were between the ages of 18 and 24; 24% were from 25 to 44; 28% were from 45 to 64; and 17.5% were 65 years of age or older. The gender makeup of the city was 48.1% male and 51.9% female.

=== 2000 census ===
As of the census of 2000, there were 9,684 people, 4,025 households, and 2,741 families residing in the city. The population density was 1,395.6 inhabitants per square mile (538.8/km^{2}). There were 4,180 housing units at an average density of 602.4 units per square mile (232.6 units/km^{2}). The racial makeup of the city was 98.18% White, 0.18% African American, 0.30% Native American, 0.43%Asian, 0.01% Pacific Islander, 0.33% from other races, and 0.57% from two or more races. Hispanic or Latino of any race were 1.16% of the population.

There were 4,025 households, out of which 30.8% had children under the age of 18 living with them, 57.4% were married couples living together, 8.0% had a female householder with no husband present, and 31.9% were non-families. 28.5% of all households were made up of individuals, and 14.3% had someone living alone who was 65 years of age or older. The average household size was 2.40 and the average family size was 2.96.

In the city, the population was spread out, with 24.4% under the age of 18, 6.9% from 18 to 24, 28.4% from 25 to 44, 23.3% from 45 to 64, and 17.1% who were 65 years of age or older. The median age was 39 years. For every 100 females, there were 94.0 males. For every 100 females age 18 and over, there were 89.2 males.

The median income for a household in the city was $49,299, and the median income for a family was $60,028. Males had a median income of $47,859 versus $27,321 for females. The per capita income for the city was $23,443. About 3.1% of families and 4.6% of the population were below the poverty line, including 5.1% of those under age 18 and 8.4% of those age 65 or over.

== Marysville Station: Border Patrol ==
Marysville is home to a U.S. Customs and Border Protection station, established in 1960. The station, originally located in Port Huron, was moved south to River Road in Marysville, along the St. Clair River. In October 2007 a new 16,500-square-foot (1,530 m^{2}) facility opened at 2600 Wills St. The Marysville station is responsible for the United States-Canada border from Lake St. Clair, the St. Clair River and southern Lake Huron up into Michigan's Thumb. This territory includes the nearby international Blue Water Bridge crossing and St. Clair Tunnel.

== Marysville School District ==
Marysville Public Schools serves the city of Marysville and portions of St. Clair Township, and Kimball Township.

There are 5 schools in Marysville: 3 elementary, 1 middle school, and 1 high school.

- Marysville Gardens Elementary School
- Washington Elementary School
- Morton Elementary School
- Marysville Middle School
- Marysville High School

== Economy ==
Marysville has a very developed industrial economy. It houses a major Intertape Polymer factory and Mueller Brass factory. Marysville is also home to Marysville Hydrocarbons, site of a recently completed ethanol plant near the southern city border. Marysville has a growing industrial park, which includes an auto parts (previously Chrysler) factory, an addition to the MOPAR parts distribution center. In 1973, Consumers Energy built a synthetic gas plant near Marysville Michigan. It was the first of its kind ever built. In 1973 the Marysville gas reforming plant could produce up to 100 million cubic feet of gas per day. That doubled in 1974 when a second train was brought on line, providing up to 220 million cubic feet (6.2 million cubic metres) of gas per day from 50,000 barrels/day of liquid hydrocarbon feedstock. The plant used natural gas liquids imported from Ontario via a pipeline under the St. Clair River. The gas produced was of comparable quality to natural gas. At one point, Marysville gas powered over one quarter of all Consumers Power customers in Michigan. It also helped lessen the effects felt by Consumers Power customers during the 1973 oil crisis. The plant was shut down for economic reasons in 1979. It is now the location of Marysville Hydrocarbons, an ethanol refinery. Many local corn growers and elevators truck their grain to Marysville for ethanol processing. Marysville Hydrocarbons is the only one of its kind in the immediate area.

Commercially, Marysville includes a Meijer supermarket and numerous local places of business.

== Climate ==
This climatic region is typified by large seasonal temperature differences, with warm to hot (and often humid) summers and cold (sometimes severely cold) winters. According to the Köppen Climate Classification system, Marysville has a humid continental climate, abbreviated "Dfb" on climate maps.

== Government and politics ==
In August 2019, a comment made by a candidate for Marysville City Council during a "Meet the Candidates" forum hosted by WPHM made national and international news. Jean Cramer was asked about how to grow the city's population and stated she wished to, "Keep Marysville a white community as much as possible." Audio of the exchange, which also included remarks about interracial marriage and immigrants was picked up by outlets including CNN, Washington Post, and New York Times. Cramer would later end her campaign yet still earned 180 votes.

== Notable people ==
- Chad Billins, hockey player
- Every Avenue, pop punk band under Fearless Records
- Harry Joseph Bowman, Former international president of the Outlaws Motorcycle Club
