= Marysville High School (Marysville, Michigan) =

High school in Michigan, United States

Coordinates: 42°54′38″N 82°28′32″W

- 555 E. Huron Blvd, Marysville, MI 48040, USA

Information
- Type: Public
- Established: 1942
- School district: Marysville School District
- Principal: Mr. Phillip Gartland
- Teaching staff: 35.60 (FTE)
- Grades: 9-12
- Enrollment: 792 (2023-2024)
- Student to teacher ratio: 22.25
- Colors: Navy and white
- Mascot: Viking
- Website: https://www.marysville.k12.mi.us/our-schools/marysville-high-school/

Student assessments
- 2021–22 school year Change vs. prior year

M-STEP 11th grade proficiency rates (Science / Social Studies)
- Advanced %: 33.3 / 17.7
- Proficient %: 30.6 / 32.8
- PR. Proficient %: 15.6 / 40.9
- Not Proficient %: 20.4 / 8.6

Average test scores
- SAT Total: 1024.2 (▼ −3.6)

Marysville High School is a public high school in Marysville, Michigan. The school building was constructed in 2010. The previous school, which stood one block west, was in service from 1942 until its demolition in 2010.

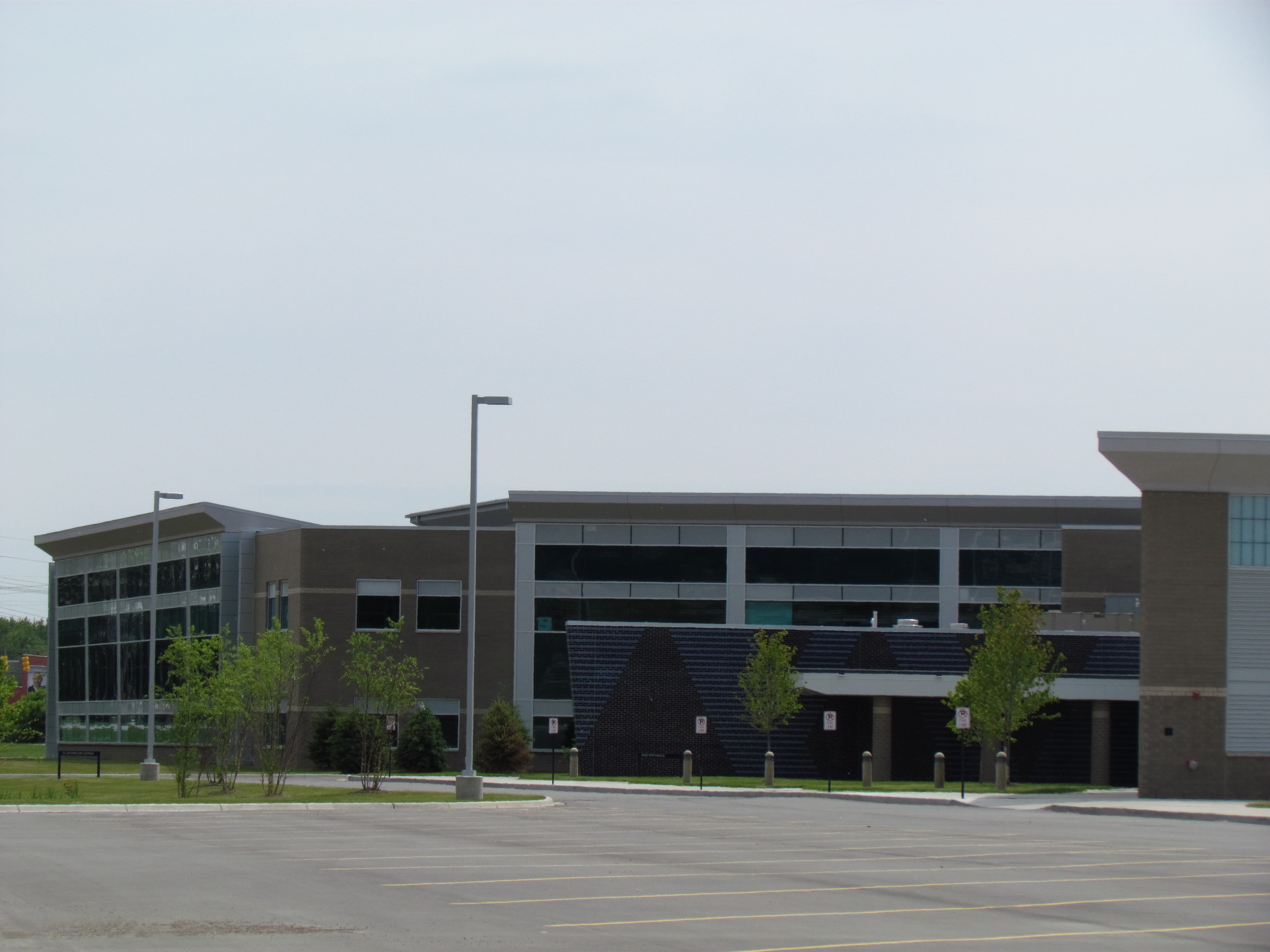
Marysville High School from the west.

The high school has an enrollment of 811, and is a class B school. Marysville High School is in the Macomb Area Conference of the Michigan High School Athletic Association. Its mascot is the Viking, and its colors are navy blue and white with silver accents.

== History ==
The original Marysville High School was constructed in the 1920s and taught grades 6 to 12. It was located at the corner of Huron Blvd. and Michigan Ave. in what was downtown Marysville. In the 1940s, the relatively small school could not accommodate the growing population of the city, caused in part by the opening of the Wills Sainte Claire automobile factory. A new school was necessary, but since this was during World War II, the school board had to petition the U.S. War Department to build the new school. Pictures of the entire student body crammed into a hallway of the old school were sent with the petition. In 1942, permission was granted to construct a new school.

The new Marysville High was built adjacent to the original building, which was later known as "the annex". During construction, the basement of the school was reinforced with steel and concrete support beams so it could double as an air raid shelter. The completed school included a gymnasium and auditorium. In later years, the Detroit Pistons held summer practices in Marysville High's gym. In the 1950s and 1960s, a swimming pool, commercial arts, and home economics wing were added.

Over the years, Marysville High School underwent more upgrades and renovations, including an addition to the south side of the school in 1979. The property was the former home of the 575-square-foot "annex", which served as the public library until it burned down in 1975. The addition contained 14 classrooms, a band room, and a choir room.

In 2007, a bond proposal to demolish the existing school and build a new one passed by a slight majority, and work began to build the next Marysville High School. The New Marysville High, located on Huron Blvd. a block east of the existing school, opened for the 2010-11 school year.

The football team plays at Walt Braun Viking Stadium at the corner of Michigan and Collard.

== Community ==
Marysville High School's pool is shared with the city's recreation department. The auditorium serves as a stage for Marysville Public Schools, and for community events. The school's football field, track, weight room, and locker rooms also serve as facilities open to the public when not being used for school functions.

== Extracurricular activities ==
=== Television ===
Marysville High School operates a community television station broadcasting to residents within the district on Comcast Cable Channel 6. The station, branded on the air as "M6, Your Hometown Station", is part of an audio/visual communication arts class. Programs aired include school and community news, school sporting events, band and choir concerts, community activities, and talk shows. Nearly all of the programs are produced by Marysville High School students, with the exception of segments distributed by St. Clair County RESA or local politicians.

The studio for M6 is located inside Marysville High School. The school television station shares Comcast Channel 6 with the City of Marysville, which airs city council meetings live on the channel. School closings and community announcements are also broadcast to the community via M6. M6 also has a YouTube channel where student programs are displayed. M6 Television YouTube Channel

=== Robotics ===
Marysville High School is an active participant in FIRST Robotics Competition, having competed since 2014 as team 5167, also known as the Vi-Bots. The team has competed at the FIRST in Michigan State Championship 4 times: 2015, 2016, 2022, and 2023. They have also competed once at the FRC World Championships during their 2016 season. The team is also part of the Blue Water Area Robotics Alliance (BWARA), which is a group of all FRC teams in St. Clair County.

The Vi-Bots are known in southeast Michigan robotics for their team spirit and robot designs, having won the team spirit award a total of 4 times along with other awards such as the Gracious Professionalism Award (2015), Excellence in Engineering Award (2016), Industrial Design Award (2018), Autonomous Award (2022), Creativity Award (2022), and Innovation in Control Award (2023).

The team participates in community activities around Marysville and St. Clair County.

Team 5167 ranked 106 out of 636 in Michigan by the end of the 2023 season.

=== Athletics ===
Marysville High School's athletics teams are affiliated with the Michigan High School Athletic Association and compete in the Macomb Area Conference.

==== Softball ====
The softball team won the MHSAA Class B State Championship in 1983 and were the Class B runner-up in 1991, and were the Division 2 runner up in 2021.

==== Tennis ====
In the Fall of 2010 the boys' tennis team went undefeated in the MAC gold division and then placed second at the regional competition, qualifying for state competition.

In the Spring of 2016 the women's tennis team placed second at the regional competition, qualifying for state competition.

==== Volleyball ====
The volleyball team has won nine MHSAA Class B State Championships, including an MHSAA record eight consecutive titles between 1997 and 2004. Their ninth championship came in 2006. The volleyball team also holds a national record for the longest winning streak, in any sport. From 1996 to 2000, the Marysville Viking volleyball team won 192 consecutive games.

==== Cheerleading ====
Under head coach Laura Breidenich, the cheer team won MHSAA Regional Championships in 1996, 1997, 1998, 1999, and 2000. The team also won Regional Championships through the Michigan Cheerleading Coaches Association state championship series in 1997, 2002, 2003, 2004 and 2006. The cheerleading team was named first in the MCCA State Championship in 2003. Coach Laura Breidenich retired after the 2003-2004 season, but returned in 2020 after she moved back to Michigan as Laura Dodd. She subsequently led her team to win five Macomb Area Conference championships in a row in 2021, 2022, 2023, 2024, and 2025. The cheer team won the school's only Competitive Cheer district championship in 2023. Marysville qualified for regionals all five of those years as well before Coach Dodd retired for good at the end of the 24-25 season.

==== Football ====
The football team has won three state championships: 1992 (MHSAA Class B); 1986 (MHSAA Class B); 1961 (AP Class B). Marysville holds the Michigan record for consecutive winning seasons with 39, running from 1965 to 2003. The Marysville Vikings play football at Walt Braun Stadium named after two time State championship winning coach Walt Braun. Braun's Tenure in Marysville was marked by unprecedented success that eventually culminated in the coach being inducted into the State of Michigan Coach's Hall of Fame.

The 1983 Marysville Vikings are the only team in the history of the MHSAA to be ranked #1 in the AP Poll at the end of the regular season, remain undefeated throughout the course of the playoffs, yet not win the state championship. As a result, the team is referred to as the "Mythical State Champions".

==== Cross Country ====
The Marysville High School Cross Country team has competed in the MAC Blue Division. The women's cross country team has made it to the MHSAA state championships for five consecutive years (2015-2018). The women's cross country team also won their regional meet in 2017.

==== Swimming/Diving ====
In 2021, The Girls swim and dive team placed first in the MAC Blue Division meet held by MHSAA. They also placed in states with their 400 freestyle relay in the same meet. They’re now placed in the MAC White division because of their winning streak throughout the 2021-2022 school year season. They were undefeated throughout the whole 2021-2022 season as well.

==== Golf ====
The Women's golf team was started in 2010 by head coach Wendy Palmateer. In 2013 the team went undefeated throughout their season winning the MAC Blue Divisional Tournament, the St. Clair County Tournament and the 2013 Regional Tournament. The team did not place at the MHSAA State Championship. The team also placed 2nd at the 2018 Regional tournament after also having an undefeated season.

==== Bowling ====
The Men's bowling team went undefeated in the 2013-2014 winter season. The team won the Division Tournament, the Regional Tournament, and was the 2014 MHSAA State Championship Runner-Up.

=== Marysville Viking Regiment ===
The Marysville Viking Regiment is the high school's band program, which involves sophomores, juniors and seniors. A freshman band competes as a separate entity, the "Marysville Freshmen Marching Band". The Viking Regiment competes both in the Michigan Competing Band Association (MCBA) and the Michigan School Band and Orchestra Association (MSBOA). For the better part of the past decade, the band has competed in state finals at Ford Field in Detroit, taking second place in 2009. The band has also received straight Division I (excellent) ratings in both marching and symphonic band since 1996.

The bands march together during parades, including Walt Disney World, America's Thanksgiving Day Parade in Detroit, local parades, festivals, and football games. The band program has jazz band available to students in addition to concert band. Every three years, The Marysville Viking Regiment travels to Walt Disney World to perform in Disney's Magic Music Days, which includes a workshop on professional musicianship, and a parade in Magic Kingdom. 2013 will mark the 9th year for this tour.
