= 2016–17 Quinnipiac Bobcats women's basketball team =

Intercollegiate basketball season

2016–17 Quinnipiac Bobcats women's basketball
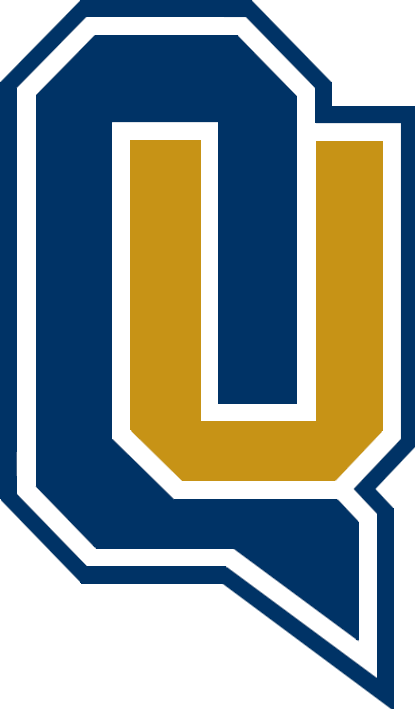

MAAC regular-season and tournament champions

NCAA women's tournament, Sweet Sixteen
- Conference: Metro Atlantic Athletic Conference

Ranking
- Coaches: No. 16
- Record: 29–7 (17–3 MAAC)
- Head coach: Tricia Fabbri (22nd season)
- Assistant coaches: Mountain MacGillivray; Danielle Brennan; Destini Hughes
- Home arena: TD Bank Sports Center

2016–17 MAAC women's basketball standings
| | Conf. | | | | Overall |
| Team | W | | L | PCT | W | | L | PCT |
|---|---|---|---|---|---|---|---|---|
| Quinnipiac † | 17 | – | 3 | .850 | 29 | – | 7 | .806 |
| Rider | 16 | – | 4 | .800 | 24 | – | 9 | .727 |
| Fairfield | 13 | – | 7 | .650 | 17 | – | 14 | .548 |
| Siena | 13 | – | 7 | .650 | 14 | – | 16 | .467 |
| Iona | 12 | – | 8 | .600 | 18 | – | 13 | .581 |
| Marist | 11 | – | 9 | .550 | 15 | – | 17 | .469 |
| Monmouth | 9 | – | 11 | .450 | 15 | – | 16 | .484 |
| Canisius | 8 | – | 12 | .400 | 10 | – | 21 | .323 |
| Niagara | 5 | – | 15 | .250 | 8 | – | 22 | .267 |
| Manhattan | 4 | – | 16 | .200 | 8 | – | 22 | .267 |
| Saint Peter's | 2 | – | 18 | .100 | 3 | – | 27 | .100 |
† 2017 MAAC tournament winner As of March 25, 2017; Rankings from AP poll

The 2016–17 Quinnipiac Bobcats women's basketball team represented Quinnipiac University during the 2016–17 NCAA Division I women's basketball season. The Bobcats were led by 22nd-year head coach, Tricia Fabbri. They played their home games in TD Bank Sports Center and were members of the Metro Atlantic Athletic Conference (MAAC). They finished the season 29–7, 17–3 in MAAC play, to win MAAC regular-season and tournament titles to earn an automatic trip to the NCAA women's tournament. They upset Marquette and Miami (FL) in the first and second rounds before falling to eventual champions South Carolina in the sweet sixteen.

== Roster ==
2016–17 Quinnipiac Bobcats women's basketball team
Players
Coaches

| Pos. | # | Name | Height | Year | Previous school | Hometown |
|---|---|---|---|---|---|---|
| G/F | 1 | Vanessa Udoji | 5 ft 11 in (1.8 m) | Fr | Northfield Mount Hermon | Randolph, MA |
| G | 2 | Taylor Herd | 5 ft 9 in (1.75 m) | Fr | Lansdale Catholic | Quakertown, PA |
| G | 3 | Adily Martucci | 5 ft 8 in (1.73 m) | RS Sr | Waterford | Waterford, CT |
| F | 4 | Paula Strautmane | 6 ft 0 in (1.83 m) | So | Latvia U16, U18 & U20 national team TTT Riga | Mucenieki, Latvia |
| G | 5 | Carly Fabbri | 5 ft 7 in (1.7 m) | Jr | Lauralton Hall | Stratford, CT |
| F | 10 | Jaden Ward | 6 ft 0 in (1.83 m) | Fr | Wisconsin Dells | Wisconsin Dells, WI |
| G | 11 | Edel Thornton | 5 ft 11 in (1.8 m) | So | Ireland U18 National Team; Brunell | Gurranabraher, Ireland |
| F | 13 | Sarah Shewan | 6 ft 2 in (1.88 m) | Jr | St. Thomas Aquinas Catholic | Russell, ON |
| G | 15 | Brianah Ramos | 5 ft 9 in (1.75 m) | Sr | DePaul Catholic | Montgomery, NY |
| F | 20 | Paige Warfel | 6 ft 0 in (1.83 m) | Fr | Downingtown East | Chester Springs, PA |
| F | 21 | Jen Fay | 6 ft 0 in (1.83 m) | RS So | Lynbrook; Nazareth | Lynbrook, NY |
| G | 22 | Brittany Johnson | 5 ft 11 in (1.8 m) | Jr | Pickerington North | Pickerington, OH |
| G | 23 | Brittany Martin | 5 ft 6 in (1.68 m) | So | Timber Creek | Sicklerville, NJ |
| C | 24 | Katie Grant | 6 ft 4 in (1.93 m) | Fr | Horizon | Phoenix, AZ |
| G/F | 25 | Aryn McClure | 5 ft 11 in (1.8 m) | So | Archbishop Molloy | Springfield Gardens, NY |
| F | 35 | Morgan Manz | 6 ft 1 in (1.85 m) | Sr | Pomperaug; The Taft School | Southbury, CT |

Head coach

- Tricia Fabbri (Fairfield)

Assistant coach(es)

- Mountain MacGillivray (Temple)
- Danielle Brennan (Hartford)
- Destini Hughes (LSU)

Legend

- (C) Team captain
- (S) Suspended
- (I) Ineligible
- (W) Walk-on
- Injured
- Current redshirt

Roster
Last update: August 9, 2024

== Schedule ==
| Date time, TV | Rank^{#} | Opponent^{#} | Result | Record | Site (attendance) city, state |
Regular season
| November 11, 2016*; 2:00 p.m. | | Florida Gulf Coast | W 76–66 | 1–0 | TD Bank Sports Center (505); Hamden, CT |
| November 13, 2016*; 2:00 p.m. | | at Dayton | W 63–60 | 2–0 | UD Arena (1,786); Dayton, OH |
| November 16, 2016*; 7:00 p.m. | | at Holy Cross | W 78–55 | 3–0 | Hart Center (475); Worcester, MA |
| November 20, 2016*; 2:00 p.m. | | Northeastern | W 76–59 | 4–0 | TD Bank Sports Center (546); Hamden, CT |
| November 27, 2016*; 2:00 p.m. | | at Temple | L 68–71 | 4–1 | McGonigle Hall (1,159); Philadelphia, PA |
| December 1, 2016; 7:00 p.m. | | at Saint Peter's | W 84–51 | 5–1 (1–0) | Yanitelli Center (150); Jersey City, NJ |
| December 3, 2016; 2:00 p.m. | | Siena | W 73–47 | 6–1 (2–0) | TD Bank Sports Center (423); Hamden, CT |
| December 6, 2016*; 7:00 p.m. | | Michigan State | L 54–71 | 6–2 | TD Bank Sports Center (1,293); Hamden, CT |
| December 10, 2016*; 2:00 p.m. | | at Hartford | W 82–59 | 7–2 | Chase Arena at Reich Family Pavilion (1,072); Hartford, CT |
| December 19, 2016*; 6:00 p.m. | | vs. New Mexico State; Play4Kay Shootout quarterfinals | W 49–46 | 8–2 | T-Mobile Arena; Paradise, NV |
| December 20, 2016*; 11:00 p.m. | | vs. No. 25 Oregon State; Play4Kay Shootout semifinals | L 60–75 | 8–3 | T-Mobile Arena (1,096); Paradise, NV |
| December 21, 2016*; 8:30 p.m. | | vs. Long Beach State; Play4Kay Shootout 3rd-place game | W 63–60 | 9–3 | T-Mobile Arena; Paradise, NV |
| December 30, 2016; 7:00 p.m. | | at Rider | W 91–79 | 10–3 (3–0) | Alumni Gymnasium (989); Lawrenceville, NJ |
| January 2, 2017; 7:00 p.m. | | Saint Peter's | W 82–47 | 11–3 (4–0) | TD Bank Sports Center (347); Hamden, CT |
| January 5, 2017; 11:00 a.m. | | at Niagara | W 71–64 | 12–3 (5–0) | Gallagher Center (2,100); Lewiston, NY |
| January 7, 2017; 2:00 p.m., ESPN3 | | at Canisius | W 64–53 | 13–3 (6–0) | Koessler Athletic Center (678); Buffalo, NY |
| January 10, 2017; 7:00 p.m. | | Manhattan | W 81–38 | 14–3 (7–0) | TD Bank Sports Center (302); Hamden, CT |
| January 16, 2017; 2:00 p.m. | | Fairfield | W 60–55 | 15–3 (8–0) | TD Bank Sports Center (981); Hamden, CT |
| January 19, 2017; 11:00 a.m. | | at Monmouth | L 58–61 | 15–4 (8–1) | OceanFirst Bank Center (2,983); West Long Branch, NJ |
| January 21, 2017; 2:00 p.m. | | Rider | W 79–53 | 16–4 (9–1) | TD Bank Sports Center (1,036); Hamden, CT |
| January 26, 2017; 7:00 p.m., SNY | | Niagara | W 61–45 | 17–4 (10–1) | TD Bank Sports Center (359); Hamden, CT |
| January 28, 2017; 2:00 p.m., ESPN3 | | at Iona | L 44–58 | 17–5 (10–2) | Hynes Athletic Center (359); New Rochelle, NY |
| February 2, 2017; 5:00 p.m., ESPN3 | | at Fairfield | L 52–65 | 17–6 (10–3) | Webster Bank Arena (470); Bridgeport, CT |
| February 4, 2017; 1:00 p.m. | | Monmouth | W 74–54 | 18–6 (11–3) | TD Bank Sports Center (808); Hamden, CT |
| February 9, 2017; 5:00 p.m., ESPN3 | | Marist | W 79–57 | 19–6 (12–3) | TD Bank Sports Center (111); Hamden, CT |
| February 12, 2017; 2:00 p.m., ESPN3 | | at Siena | W 79–57 | 20–6 (13–3) | Alumni Recreation Center (640); Loudonville, NY |
| February 17, 2017; 2:00 p.m., ESPNU | | Iona | W 53–45 | 21–6 (14–3) | TD Bank Sports Center (753); Hamden, CT |
| February 19, 2017; 3:00 p.m. | | at Manhattan | W 69–49 | 22–6 (15–3) | Draddy Gymnasium (268); Riverdale, NY |
| February 23, 2017; 5:30 p.m., ESPN3 | | at Marist | W 70–36 | 23–6 (16–3) | McCann Field House (1,305); Poughkeepsie, NY |
| February 25, 2017; 2:00 p.m. | | Canisius | W 62–49 | 24–6 (17–3) | TD Bank Sports Center (1,096); Hamden, CT |
MAAC women's tournament
| March 3, 2017; 1:00 p.m. | (1) | vs. (8) Canisius; Quarterfinals | W 63–58 | 25–6 | Times Union Center (1,625); Albany, NY |
| March 5, 2017; 11:00 a.m., ESPN3 | (1) | vs. (5) Iona; Semifinals | W 64–59 | 26–6 | Times Union Center (1,802); Albany, NY |
| March 6, 2017; 5:00 p.m., ESPN3 | (1) | vs. (2) Rider; Championship game | W 81–73 | 27–6 | Times Union Center (1,733); Albany, NY |
NCAA women's tournament
| March 18, 2017*; 1:30 p.m., ESPN2 | (12 S) | vs. (5 S) Marquette; First round | W 68–65 | 28–6 | Watsco Center (2,009); Coral Gables, FL |
| March 20, 2017*; 9:00 p.m., ESPN2 | (12 S) | at (4 S) No. 16 Miami (FL); Second round | W 85–78 | 29–6 | Watsco Center (1,972); Coral Gables, FL |
| March 25, 2017*; 4:00 p.m., ESPN | (12 S) | vs. (1 S) No. 3 South Carolina; Sweet Sixteen | L 58–100 | 29–7 | Stockton Arena; Stockton, CA |
*Non-conference game. ^{#}Rankings from AP poll. (#) Tournament seedings in parentheses. S=Stockton Region. All times are in Eastern.

== See also ==
- 2016–17 Quinnipiac Bobcats men's basketball team
