= Jason Chambers =

American mixed martial arts fighter (born 1980)

- Born: March 23, 1980 (age 46); Chicago, Illinois, U.S.
- Other names: Hollywood, The Human Weapon
- Height: 6 ft 0 in (1.83 m)
- Weight: 170.0 lb (77.1 kg)
- Division: Welterweight
- Style: Wrestling, Boxing, Muay Thai, Judo, MCMAP, Karate, Brazilian Jiu-Jitsu, Sambo, Jeet Kune Do, Krav Maga, Savate, Taekwondo, Kung Fu, Kali, Pankration
- Team: Renzo Gracie
- Rank: Black Belt in Brazilian Jiu-Jitsu

Mixed martial arts record
- Total: 25
- Wins: 18
- By knockout: 5
- By submission: 10
- By decision: 3
- Losses: 5
- By submission: 4
- By decision: 1
- Draws: 2

Other information
- Website: Official website
- Boxing record from BoxRec
- Mixed martial arts record from Sherdog

Jason Chambers (born March 23, 1980, in Chicago, Illinois) is an American actor, mixed martial artist and sports commentator. He is best known for his role as the host of the popular weekly television program Human Weapon on The History Channel. He has appeared in multiple television programs including CSI, Days of Our Lives, As the World Turns and The Middleman. Chambers was featured on Extra as one of "America's Most Eligible" bachelors. Chambers is actively involved with City of Hope National Medical Center, a Cancer Research institute which he was recently appointed to the board of directors.

== Early life ==
Jason Chambers, of Greek, French and Irish descent, was born on March 23, 1980, in Chicago, Illinois, to Dale Chambers, a homemaker, and George West, who worked for Roadway Services. Chambers resided in Tinley Park, Illinois, until the age of 12, then moved to Chicago where he resided until he was 16. At 21, Chambers moved to New York City to study acting. In 2006 he moved to Los Angeles, California. Chambers resides in Miami, Florida.

== Career ==
=== Commentary ===
Chambers provided color commentary alongside Jon Anik for Bellator Fighting Championships English broadcast in their inaugural season on ESPN. He was then signed by ONE Championship as their lead color commentator. Chambers was called "The Best Color Commentator, Not in the UFC" by Cage Potato.

Although Chambers has previously sat in the color commentator seat for MMA events, he was also hired directly by the Ultimate Fighting Championship to handle Play-by-play duties for alongside Dominick Cruz and Michael Bisping for the FIGHT PASS Stream of Shooto Brazil.

=== Acting ===
Chambers began studying acting in 2000 at Act One Studios in Chicago and later improv at The Second City Training Center.

In 2003, Chambers moved to New York to continue his studies. There, he appeared in television series Guiding Light, All My Children, Can You Tell?, and As the World Turns. In 2006, Chambers moved to Los Angeles, where he was cast as Spencer on Days of Our Lives and Mercury on CSI: NY. In 2008, he was cast in the recurring role of Anvil in The Middleman on ABC Family, but he appeared in only one episode before the series was canceled after its first season.

=== Hosting ===
Chambers was the host of the series Human Weapon on the History Channel with co-host Bill Duff from July 20, 2007, to August 28, 2008. Chambers has also been a host for NBC's YourLaTv, a show featuring things to do and see in and around Los Angeles. He is a regular co-host/contributor for the "MMA Chokehold" segment of Attack of the Show!, where he, Blair Butler, and Kevin Pereira discuss upcoming MMA events.

=== Podcasting ===
The Jason Chambers Podcast (TJCP) was launched on YouTube, Spotify and iTunes September 1, 2021. Hosted by Chambers, the podcast features semi-weekly interviews with figures from various fields, such as author Ben Mezrich, MMA fighter Matt Serra, BJJ grappler Garry Tonon, cryptocurrency advocate Charlie Shrem, and comedians Bryan Callen and Russel Peters.

TJCP is one of Spotify's fastest growing News & Entertainment Podcast in the USA .

=== Other media ===
In 2010, Chambers began writing for FIGHT! Magazine. He was also featured as a contestant on the television show "Fear Factor" in 2004.

== Martial arts ==
Chambers is a Jeet Kune Do concepts instructor and has a brown belt in 10th Planet Jiu-Jitsu under Eddie Bravo and a black belt under Renzo Gracie. During his time in Israel, he learned Krav Maga.

== Mixed martial arts record ==
Professional record breakdown
25 matches	18 wins	5 losses
By knockout	5	0
By submission	10	4
By decision	3	1
Draws	2	

Res.	Record	Opponent	Method	Event	Date	Round	Time	Location	Notes
Win	18–5–2	Dan New	Submission (rear-naked choke)	TFC: Power Fights	September 20, 2008	1	2:11	Hammond, Indiana, United States	
Win	17–5–2	Rene Gonzalez	Decision (split)	Mainstream MMA: Cold War	January 26, 2008	N/A		Iowa, United States	
Loss	16–5–2	Tristan Yunker	Submission (armbar)	TFC 7: Total Fight Challenge 7	February 10, 2007	1	1:29	Hammond, Indiana	
Loss	16–4–2	Jimmy Smith	Submission (heel hook)	PF 1: The Beginning	May 12, 2006	1	1:55	Hollywood, California, United States	
Loss	16–3–2	Michihiro Omigawa	Decision (split)	Icon Sport: Lawler vs. Niko 2	February 25, 2006	3	5:00	Honolulu, Hawaii, United States	
Draw	16–2–2	Kosuke Umeda	Draw	Deep: 22 Impact	December 2, 2005	2	5:00	Tokyo, Japan	
Win	16–2–1	Billy Stamp	Submission (twister)	TFC 4: Total Fight Challenge 4	September 17, 2005	1	2:18	Hammond, Indiana	
Loss	15–2–1	Thiago Alves	Submission (verbal)	IHC 8: Ethereal	November 20, 2004	1	4:57	Hammond, Indiana	
Win	15–1–1	Emmett Olvera	Submission (armbar)	RM 6: Lord of the Ring	October 24, 2004	1	0:37	Tijuana, Mexico	
Win	14–1–1	Adrian Serrano	Submission (guillotine choke)	TMAC 2: Total Martial Arts Challenge 2	August 28, 2004	1	0:27	Hammond, Indiana	
Win	13–1–1	Mark Long	TKO (punches)	TFC 1: Total Fight Challenge 1	April 24, 2004	1	0:52	Hammond, Indiana	
Win	12–1–1	Josh Kruger	Submission (armbar)	TMAC: Total Martial Arts Challenge	June 7, 2003	1	1:11	Cicero, Illinois, United States	
Win	11–1–1	Erick Snyder	Submission (guillotine choke)	MFC: Maximum Fighting Challenge	September 7, 2002	1	1:53	Hammond, Indiana	
Win	10–1–1	Justin Hynes	Submission (guillotine choke)	TCC: Total Combat Challenge	April 13, 2002	N/A		Hammond, Indiana	
Win	9–1–1	Jack Jones	Submission (strikes)	TC: Total Combat 2	September 16, 2000	1		Chicago, Illinois, United States	
Win	8–1–1	Corey Talbert	Submission (armbar)	TCC: Total Combat Challenge	February 24, 2000	1	1:44	Chicago, Illinois	
Loss	7–1–1	Dan Spychalski	Submission (ankle lock)	MAC: Midwest Absolute Challenge	December 4, 1999	1	7:20	McHenry, Illinois, United States	
Win	7–0–1	Efrain Saladar	TKO	IE: Independent Event	November 20, 1999	2	2:12		
Win	6–0–1	Mike Court	Decision	XC: Xtreme Challenge	May 22, 1999	N/A			
Draw	5–0–1	Bill Peach	Draw	CC 6: Chicago Challenge 6	May 22, 1999	N/A	0:00	Chicago, Illinois	
Win	5–0	Ken Davis	TKO (strikes)	JKD: Challenge 4	April 24, 1999	N/A			
Win	4–0	Alex Evan	Submission (rear-naked choke)	RBP: Fight Night	January 15, 1999	1		Chicago, Illinois	
Win	3–0	Tony Velasquez	TKO	RBP: Fight Night	June 26, 1998	1		Chicago, Illinois	
Win	2–0	Nicolas Smith	Decision (unanimous)	RBP: Fight Night	April 24, 1998	N/A		Chicago, Illinois	
Win	1–0	Jose Gomez	TKO (injury)	RBP: Fight Night	April 3, 1998	1		Chicago, Illinois	
