= Delran High School =

High school in Burlington County, New Jersey, US

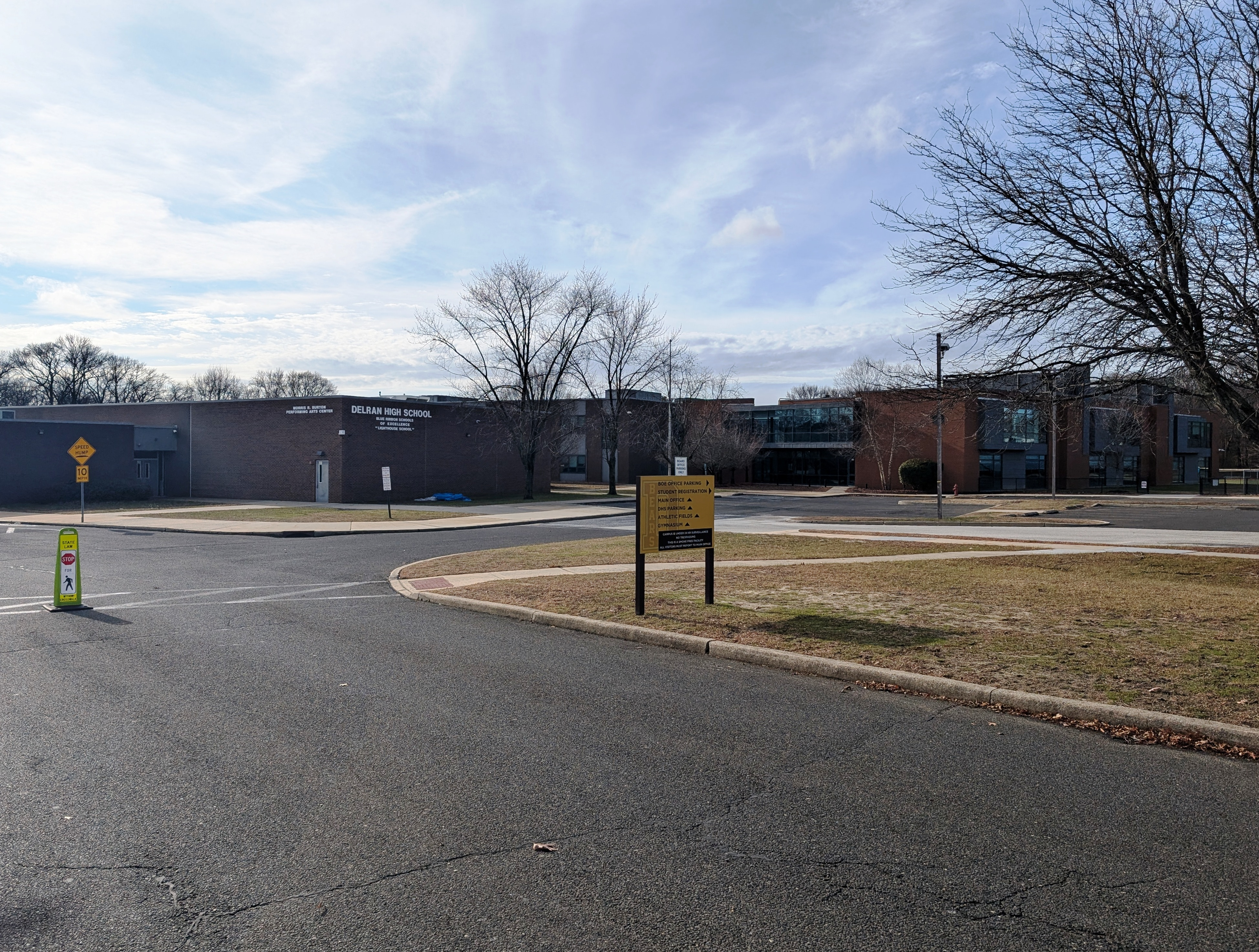

Location
- 52 Hartford Road; Delran Township, Burlington County, New Jersey 08075; United States; 40.0139°N 74.9427°W

Information
- Type: Public high school
- Established: September 1975
- School district: Delran Township School District
- NCES School ID: 340378001040
- Principal: Brian Stolarick
- Faculty: 78.8 FTEs
- Grades: 9-12
- Enrollment: 922 (as of 2024–25)
- Student to teacher ratio: 11.7:1
- Colors: Brown and Gold
- Athletics conference: Burlington County Scholastic League Freedom Division (general); West Jersey Football League (football)
- Team name: Bears
- Rival: Cinnaminson Pirates
- Yearbook: Spirit
- Website: dhs.delranschools.org

Delran High School is a four-year comprehensive public high school serving students in ninth through twelfth grades from Delran Township in Burlington County, in the U.S. state of New Jersey, operating as the lone secondary school of the Delran Township School District.

As of the 2024–25 school year, the school had an enrollment of 922 students and 78.8 classroom teachers (on an FTE basis), for a student–teacher ratio of 11.7:1. There were 231 students (25.1% of enrollment) eligible for free lunch and 53 (5.7% of students) eligible for reduced-cost lunch.

== History ==
Starting in 1954 and continuing into the 1970s, students from Delran Township attended Riverside High School as part of sending/receiving relationships, along with those from Delanco Township.

To address overcrowding at Riverside High School, efforts to merge the three districts in Delanco, Delran and Riverside Townships into a combined regional K-12 system were rejected in a November 1971 referendum, with Delran Township voters in favor of the regionalization and the voters in the other two municipalities opposed. The school, constructed at a cost of $6 million (equivalent to $35.9 million in 2025), opened for the 1975–76 school year with 864 students in grades 9–12.

=== Expansions ===
In 2008, a referendum was passed, which included $25.8 million in spending that included construction of a new science wing to the school as well as renovations to the existing building.

In 2019, a new fab lab was constructed, replacing an old auto shop building.

== Awards, recognition and rankings ==
The school was the 169th-ranked public high school in New Jersey out of 339 schools statewide in New Jersey Monthly magazine's September 2014 cover story on the state's "Top Public High Schools", using a new ranking methodology. The school had been ranked 230th in the state of 328 schools in 2012, after being ranked 179th in 2010 out of 322 schools listed. The magazine ranked the school 155th in 2008 out of 316 schools. The school was ranked 112th in the magazine's September 2006 issue, which surveyed 316 schools across the state.

== Athletics ==
The Delran High School Bears compete in the Freedom Division of the Burlington County Scholastic League (BCSL) sports association, which is comprised of public and private high schools covering Burlington, Camden, Mercer and Ocean counties in Central Jersey and operates under the jurisdiction of the New Jersey State Interscholastic Athletic Association (NJSIAA). With 658 students in grades 10–12, the school was classified by the NJSIAA for the 2022–23 school year as South, Group 2 for most athletic competition purposes, which included schools with an enrollment of 486 to 758 students in that grade range. The football team competes in the Liberty Division of the 94-team West Jersey Football League superconference and was classified by the NJSIAA as Group II South for football for 2024–2026, which included schools with 514 to 685 students. The school's mascot is the bear and school colors are brown and gold.

The boys' soccer team has won the NJSIAA Group II championship in 1983 (defeating Millburn High School in the tournament final), 1986 (as co-champion with Millburn), 1988 (as co-champion with Chatham High School), 2003 (as co-champion with Kearny High School), 2004 (vs. Harrison High School), 2008 (as co-champion with Cliffside Park High School), 2009 (vs. Cliffside Park) and 2013 (vs. Newton High School); the program's eight group championships is the tenth-most among high schools in the state. The 1983 team finished the season with a record of 22-0-1 after defeating Millburn by a score of 2–1 on a goal scored by Peter Vermes with under a minute left in the second overtime period in the Group II finals. The 1986 team finished the season with a record of 17-5-1 after being declared as co-champion with Delran following a 1–1 tie in the tournament final played at Trenton State College. The 2003 team was Group I state co-champion after a 1–1 tie with Harrison High School. The team moved on to win the 2004 Group II state championship with a shootout win vs. Cinnaminson High School in the semifinals and a 2–1 victory against Harrison High School in the tournament final. In 2005, they lost the sectional finals with a 2–1 loss to Haddonfield Memorial High School. In 2007 The team also made it to the sectional finals with a 4–1 loss to Cinnaminson High School. The team won the 2008 Central Jersey Group II sectional with a 3–1 win over Shore Regional High School. Then they moved on to play Middle Township High School in the state semis and won 4–2. They drew 2–2 in the state finals to Cliffside Park High School. They recently won the 2009 Central Jersey Group II with a 2–1 over-time victory in the quarter-finals over school rival Cinnaminson High School. In the finals they defeated Raritan High School in penalty-kicks after drawing 0–0 in regulation. Then they played West Deptford High School and pulled a 1–0 victory over the South Jersey Group II champions in the state semi-finals. In the state finals they had a re-match with Cliffside Park High School, the team they tied in the state-finals the previous year, and ended up beating them, 2–0. By winning the Group II state championships they finished their 2009 season with a 21-2-1 record and were ranked 5th in the state, 2nd in South Jersey and 1st in Group II by The Star-Ledger. In 2013, the team defeated Newton High School in the tournament final by a score of 3–2 in overtime to win the Group II title.

The baseball team won the Group II state championship in 1983 (defeating Secaucus High School in the finals of the tournament) and 1995 (vs. Jefferson Township High School).

The girls soccer team won the Group II state championship in 1986 (defeating runner-up Governor Livingston High School) and 1988 (vs. Glen Rock High School).

The wrestling team won the South Jersey Group II state sectional title in 1986 and 1992. The team took third place in the Group II state championships in both 1986 and 1992. Coach Dennis Smith retired in 2013 with a career coaching record of 605–196–5, making him the winningest coach in South Jersey history.

The football team won the South Jersey Group II state sectional championship in 1987, 1989, 1990 and 1992.

In 1990 and 1991, the Delran swimming team won back-to-back boys Division B state titles. All-American and Olympic qualifier Jason Rosenbaum held the fastest state 100m freestyle time from 1991 until 2014.

The boys cross country team won the Group II state championship in 1991.

The boys spring track team won the state championship in Group II in 1994.

The girls basketball team won the Group II state title in 1995, with an 84–49 win against runner-up Morris Hills High School in the tournament final.

The softball team defeated Arthur L. Johnson High School in the final of the playoffs to win the 1995 Group II state championship.

The Varsity Tier II Delran Ice Hockey Club represents the school in the South Jersey High School Ice Hockey League.

== Administration ==
The school's principal is Brian Stolarick. His administration team includes two assistant principals.

== Notable alumni ==
- Raphael Bostic (born 1966), economist, academic, and public servant who is the 15th President and CEO of the Federal Reserve Bank of Atlanta.
- Bill Duff (born 1974; class of 1993). co-host of Human Weapon on History and is a former National Football League defensive tackle.
- Tricia Fabbri (class of 1987), women's basketball head coach at Quinnipiac University.
- Kenny Fletcher Jr. (born 2003; class of 2022), NFL tight end for the Tampa Bay Buccaneers.
- Nate Hemsley (born 1974; class of 1991), former linebacker for the Dallas Cowboys of the National Football League.
- Alex Lewis (born 1981), former linebacker for the Detroit Lions of the National Football League.
- Carli Lloyd (born 1982), United States women's national soccer team midfielder and 2008 Summer Olympics and 2012 Summer Olympics Gold Medalist.
- Todd Lowber (born 1982), former football wide receiver who played for the Toronto Argonauts of the Canadian Football League.
- Jeremy Rafanello (born 2000) soccer forward who plays for Bethlehem Steel in the United Soccer League.
- John Sacca (born 1971), former quarterback in the Arena Football League who played for the Connecticut Coyotes.
- Tony Sacca (born 1970), former quarterback for the Arizona Cardinals of the National Football League.
- Peter Vermes (born 1966), United States men's national soccer team defender, former professional soccer player. Current head coach of the Kansas City Wizards of Major League Soccer.
