= Kenny Fletcher Jr. =

American football player (born 2003)

No. 43 – Green Bay Packers
- Position: Tight end
- Roster status: Practice squad

Personal information
- Born: December 4, 2003 (age 22); Delran, New Jersey, U.S.
- Listed height: 6 ft 3 in (1.91 m)
- Listed weight: 250 lb (113 kg)

Career information
- High school: Delran (Burlington County, New Jersey)
- College: Rutgers (2022–2025)
- NFL draft: 2026: undrafted

Career history
- Tampa Bay Buccaneers (2026)*; Indianapolis Colts (2026)*; Green Bay Packers (2026–present)*
- * Offseason or practice squad member only
- Stats at Pro Football Reference

Kenny Fletcher Jr. (born December 4, 2003) is an American football tight end for the Green Bay Packers of the National Football League (NFL). He played college football for the Rutgers Scarlet Knights.

== Early life ==
Fletcher Jr. attended Delran High School in Burlington County, New Jersey, and committed to play college football for the Rutgers Scarlet Knights over offers from other schools such as Penn State, Michigan State, Louisville, and Kentucky.

== College career ==
During his first two seasons in 2022 and 2023, Fletcher Jr. recorded ten tackles with four going for a loss, two and a half sacks, and a forced fumble. Heading into the 2024 season, he transitioned from playing defensive end to tight end. In the 2024 season opener, Fletcher Jr. hauled in four passes for 31 yards and his first-career touchdown in a win over Howard. In week 3, he hauled in seven receptions in a victory against Virginia Tech. Fletcher Jr. only played in six games due to injury in 2024, recording 20 receptions for 137 yards and two touchdowns. In 2025, he hauled in 26 passes for 236 yards in ten starts.

== Professional career ==
Pre-draft measurables
Height	Weight	Arm length	Hand span	Wingspan	40-yard dash	10-yard split	20-yard split	20-yard shuttle	Three-cone drill	Vertical jump	Broad jump	Bench press
6 ft 2 7/8 in (1.90 m)	250 lb (113 kg)	31 7/8 in (0.81 m)	9 3/4 in (0.25 m)	6 ft 5 1/2 in (1.97 m)	4.60 s	1.64 s	2.78 s	4.36 s	6.95 s	34.5 in (0.88 m)	9 ft 11 in (3.02 m)	20 reps
All values from Pro Day

=== Tampa Bay Buccaneers ===
After not being selected in the 2026 NFL draft, Fletcher Jr. signed with the Tampa Bay Buccaneers as an undrafted free agent. He was waived by the Buccaneers as a part of final roster cuts on August 30, 2026.

=== Indianapolis Colts ===
On September 8, 2026, Fletcher signed with the Indianapolis Colts' practice squad. On October 7, he was released.

=== Green Bay Packers ===
On November 10, 2026, Fletcher signed with the Green Bay Packers' practice squad.
