= Khem Birch =

Canadian basketball player (born 1992)

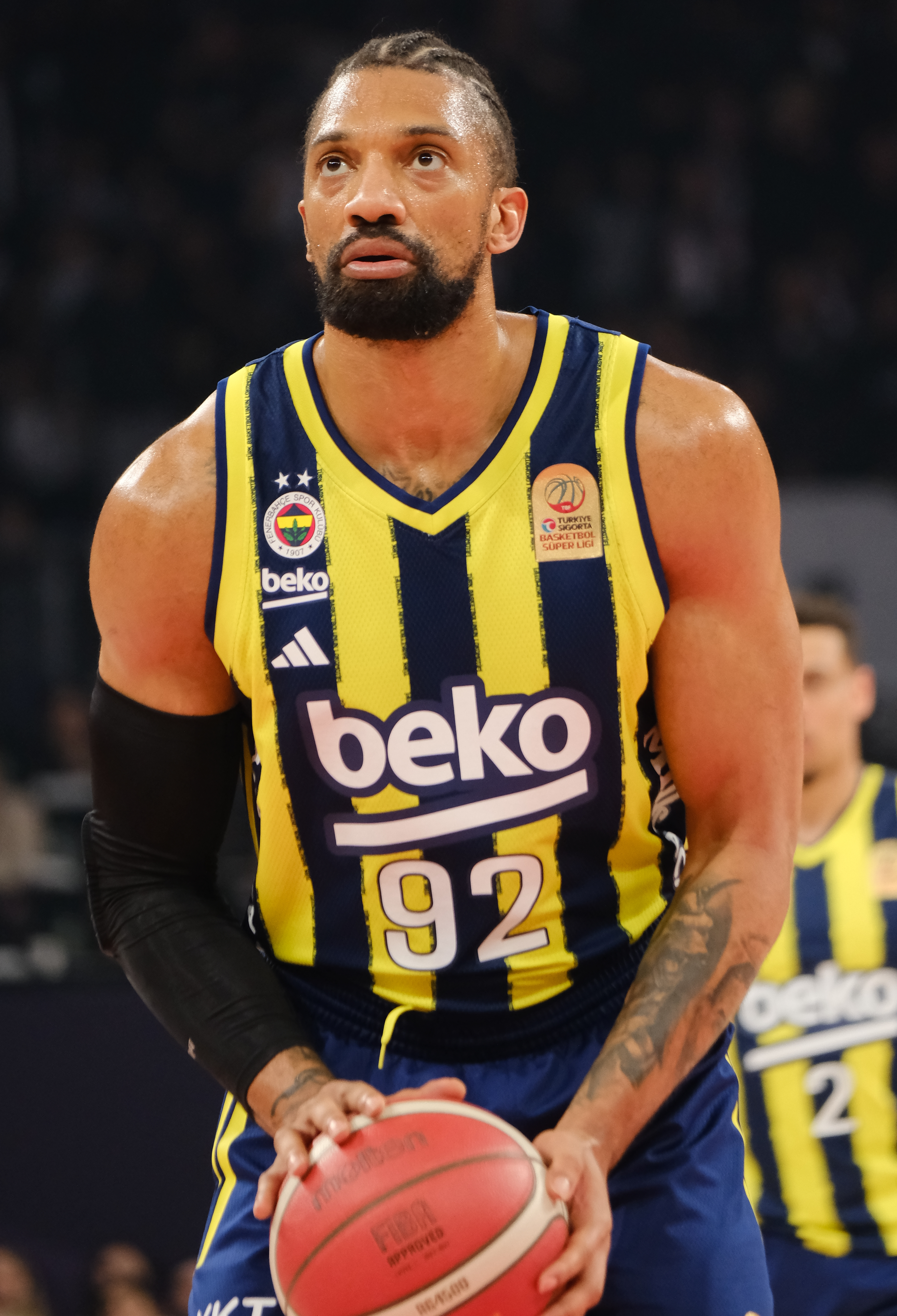
- Birch with Fenerbahçe in 2026

No. 92 – Aris Thessaloniki
- Position: Centre
- League: Greek Basketball League; EuroCup

Personal information
- Born: September 28, 1992 (age 34) Montreal, Quebec, Canada
- Listed height: 6 ft 9 in (2.06 m)
- Listed weight: 233 lb (106 kg)

Career information
- High school: St. Thomas Aquinas (Russell, Ontario); The Winchendon School (Winchendon, Massachusetts); Notre Dame Prep (Fitchburg, Massachusetts)
- College: Pittsburgh (2011–2012); UNLV (2012–2014)
- NBA draft: 2014: undrafted
- Playing career: 2014–present

Career history
- 2014–2015: Sioux Falls Skyforce
- 2015–2016: Uşak Sportif
- 2016–2017: Olympiacos
- 2017–2021: Orlando Magic
- 2017–2018: →Lakeland Magic
- 2021–2023: Toronto Raptors
- 2024: Girona
- 2024–2026: Fenerbahçe
- 2026–present: Aris Thessaloniki

Career highlights
- EuroLeague champion (2025); 2× Turkish Super League champion (2025, 2026); 2× Turkish Cup winner (2025, 2026); Turkish Super Cup winner (2025); Turkish Super League Finals MVP (2025); NBA D-League All-Rookie First Team (2015); NBA D-League All-Defensive First Team (2015); NBA D-League All-Star (2015); Turkish All-Star (2016); 2× MWC Defensive Player of the Year (2013, 2014); Second-team All-MWC (2014); 2× MWC All-Defensive Team (2013, 2014); McDonald's All-American (2011)
- Stats at NBA.com
- Stats at Basketball Reference

Khem Xavier Birch (born September 28, 1992) is a Canadian professional basketball player for Aris Thessaloniki of the Greek Basketball League (GBL) and the EuroCup. He played college basketball for the Pittsburgh Panthers and the UNLV Runnin' Rebels.

== High school career ==
Birch played varsity basketball for St. Thomas Aquinas Catholic High School in Russell, Ontario before playing out the remainder of his high school career at The Winchendon School in Winchendon, Massachusetts and Notre Dame Prep in Fitchburg, Massachusetts.

== College career ==
In 2011–12, Birch played college basketball at the University of Pittsburgh, with the Pittsburgh Panthers. He then, in 2012, transferred to UNLV, where he played with the UNLV Runnin' Rebels. As a junior, in the 2013–14 season, he averaged 10.2 rebounds per game, which was the third highest in the Mountain West Conference, while also averaging 3.8 blocks per game, which was the second highest in the Mountain West Conference. During his college career, he averaged 8.9 points, 7.8 rebounds, 0.8 assists in 25.4 minutes per game in 69 games.

In April 2014, he entered the NBA draft, foregoing his final year of college eligibility.

== Professional career ==
=== Sioux Falls Skyforce (2014–2015) ===
After going undrafted in the 2014 NBA draft, Birch joined the Washington Wizards for the 2014 NBA Summer League. On September 14, 2014, he signed with his first NBA team, the Miami Heat. However, Birch was later waived by the Heat on October 25. On November 3, Birch was acquired by the Sioux Falls Skyforce, as an affiliate player. On February 4, 2015, he was named to the Futures All-Star team for the 2015 NBA D-League All-Star Game. In the 2014–15 NBA D-League season, Birch averaged 11.1 points per game, 9.5 rebounds per game, 1.2 assists per game, 1.8 blocks per game, and 0.7 steals per game, in 52 games played.

=== Uşak Sportif (2015–2016) ===
On June 30, 2015, Birch signed to play in Turkey, with Uşak Sportif of the Turkish Super League (BSL). The following month, he joined the Brooklyn Nets for the 2015 Orlando Summer League and the New Orleans Pelicans for the 2015 Las Vegas Summer League. He went on to play with Uşak during the 2015–16 season, and he averaged 27.0 minutes, 10.5 points, 9.1 rebounds, 0.5 assists, 1.3 blocks, and 0.5 steals per game, in 32 games played in the Turkish Super League 2015–16 season.

=== Olympiacos (2016–2017) ===
On June 14, 2016, Birch signed to play in Greece, on a 2-year €1.1 million net income contract, with the defending Greek Basket League champions, Olympiacos. With Olympiacos, he averaged 15.7 minutes, 5.7 points, 5.0 rebounds, 0.4 assists, 0.8 blocks, and 0.6 steals per game, in 33 games played in the Greek Basket League 2016–17 season. He also averaged 18.1 minutes, 7.3 points, 5.6 rebounds, 0.3 assists, 1.0 blocks, and 0.5 steals per game, in 37 games played in the EuroLeague 2016–17 season, helped the team to join 2017 EuroLeague Final Four.

On July 10, 2017, Birch opted out of his contract with Olympiacos, in order to sign in the NBA.

=== Orlando Magic (2017–2021) ===
On July 27, 2017, Birch signed with the Orlando Magic.

On March 14, 2019, Birch recorded a double-double, tying his career-high with 13 points, 11 rebounds, one assist, and two steals in a 120–91 win against the Cleveland Cavaliers.

On July 10, 2019, Birch re-signed with the Magic on a 2-year contract.

On March 26, 2021, Birch had his best game of his career when he netted new career-highs with 14 points, 15 rebounds and four steals with four assists and two blocks in a 112–105 loss to the Portland Trail Blazers.

On April 8, 2021, Birch was waived by the Magic.

=== Toronto Raptors (2021–2023) ===
On April 10, 2021, Birch signed with the Toronto Raptors for the remainder of the 2020–21 season, making his debut the next day during a 102–96 loss to the New York Knicks, getting four points and five rebounds in 18 minutes of action. Three days later, Birch tied his career-high with 14 points, six rebounds, one assist, one steal and two blocks in a 117–112 win against the San Antonio Spurs. On April 26, he tied his career-high again with 14 points, six rebounds, one assist, two steals and two blocks in a 112–96 win against the Cleveland Cavaliers. The next day, Birch had his first double-double with the Raptors, getting 13 points and 14 rebounds, nine of which were offensive rebounds, in a 116–103 loss against the Brooklyn Nets. On April 29, he scored a career-high 20 points, making a career-high two three-pointers while adding nine rebounds, four assists, two steals and a block in a 121–111 loss to the Denver Nuggets.

On August 6, 2021, Birch re-signed with the Raptors for 3 years and just over $20 million, keeping him with the team through the 2023–24 season.

On February 9, 2023, Birch was traded, alongside a 2024 first-round draft pick and two future second-round draft picks, to the San Antonio Spurs in exchange for Jakob Poeltl. He did not appear in a game for the team, and was waived prior to the start of the following season on October 19.

=== Bàsquet Girona (2024) ===
On February 5, 2024, Birch signed with Bàsquet Girona of the Spanish Liga ACB.

=== Fenerbahçe (2024–2026) ===
On September 11, 2024, Birch signed a one-year deal with the Turkish powerhouse Fenerbahçe. On May 25, 2025, Birch helped Fenerbahçe to their second EuroLeague championship in Abu Dhabi.

In the 2024–25 Basketbol Süper Ligi Finals against Beşiktaş Fibabanka, Birch led Fenerbahçe to won game one (94-76) with 15 points and 6 rebounds on June 17 and won game two (84-76) with 18 points and 6 rebounds on June 19, and also recorded 12 points, 8 rebounds and 1 steal in game four (87-91). then he won the Turkish League Finals MVP award for 2024-25 season.

On August 3, 2025, Birch re-signed with Fenerbahçe on a one-year contract.

=== Aris (2026–present) ===
On June 24, 2026, Birch signed a two-year contract with Aris Thessaloniki of the Greek Basketball League (GBL) and the EuroCup.

== Canadian national team ==
Birch was a member of the junior national teams of Canada. With Canada's Under-18 junior national team, he played at the 2010 FIBA Americas Under-18 Championship, where he won a bronze medal. He is also a member of the senior men's Canadian national team. With Canada's senior national team, he played at the 2016 Manila FIBA World Olympic Qualifying Tournament.

Birch represented Canada at the 2019 FIBA Basketball World Cup in China. He was named to Canada's roster for the 2024 Summer Olympics in Paris.

== Career statistics ==
Legend
GP	Games played	GS	Games started	MPG	Minutes per game
FG%	Field-goal percentage	3P%	3-point field-goal percentage	FT%	Free-throw percentage
RPG	Rebounds per game	APG	Assists per game	SPG	Steals per game
BPG	Blocks per game	PPG	Points per game	PIR	Performance index rating
**Bold**	Career high

=== NBA ===
==== Regular season ====
Year	Team	GP	GS	MPG	FG%	3P%	FT%	RPG	APG	SPG	BPG	PPG
2017–18	Orlando	42	0	13.8	.540	–	.689	4.3	.8	.4	.5	4.2
2018–19	Orlando	50	1	12.9	**.603**	.000	.699	3.8	.8	.4	.6	4.8
2019–20	Orlando	48	24	19.2	.510	.000	.653	4.6	1.0	.4	.5	4.4
2020–21	Orlando	48	5	19.8	.450	.190	.741	5.1	1.1	.7	.6	5.3
2020–21	Toronto	19	17	**30.4**	.556	.290	.636	**7.6**	**1.9**	**.8**	**1.2**	**11.9**
2021–22	Toronto	**55**	**28**	18.0	.485	.000	.746	4.3	1.1	.5	.5	4.5
2022–23	Toronto	20	0	8.1	.594	**.500**	**.800**	1.3	.4	.3	.3	2.2
Career		282	75	17.1	.520	.200	.698	4.4	1.0	.5	.5	5.0

==== Playoffs ====
Year	Team	GP	GS	MPG	FG%	3P%	FT%	RPG	APG	SPG	BPG	PPG
2019	Orlando	5	0	**18.4**	**.556**	—	.857	**6.2**	.8	**.2**	**1.0**	**5.2**
2020	Orlando	5	0	17.8	.500	—	**.909**	5.0	**1.4**	**.2**	.0	4.8
2022	Toronto	**6**	**4**	10.5	.500	.500	—	1.5	.5	**.2**	.2	3.0
Career		16	4	15.3	.521	.500	.889	4.1	.9	.2	.4	4.3

=== EuroLeague ===
*	Led the league
†	Won the league

As of match played 20 March 2026

Year	Team	GP	GS	MPG	FG%	3P%	FT%	RPG	APG	SPG	BPG	PPG	PIR
2016–17	Olympiacos	37*	21	18.1	.624	—	.643	5.6	.3	.5	1.0	7.3	10.8
2024–25 †	Fenerbahçe	36	19	13.4	.585	—	.725	3.7	.6	.4	.0	3.5	5.2
2025–26	Fenerbahçe	32	30	15.3	.622	—	.707	4.0	.5	.3	.1	3.8	4.7
Career		105	70	16.0	.614	—	.676	4.5	.5	.4	.2	4.9	7.0

=== Domestic leagues ===
As of match played 8 March 2026

†	Denotes seasons in which Birch won the domestic league

Year	Team	League	GP	MPG	FG%	3P%	FT%	RPG	APG	SPG	BPG	PPG
2015–16	(Turkey) Uşak Sportif	TBSL	32	27.2	.577	.000	.651	9.1	.5	.5	1.3	10.5
2016–17	(Greece) Olympiacos	GBL	25	17.0	.710	.000	.622	5.2	.5	.6	1.0	6.4
2023–24	(Spain) Girona	ACB	12	23.3	.519	.000	.719	5.7	.8	.6	.8	8.8
2024–25 †	(Turkey) Fenerbahçe	TBSL	28	14.1	.585	.000	.725	3.7	.6	.4	.4	3.5
2025–26 †	(Turkey) Fenerbahçe	TBSL	16	16.1	.543	.000	.583	3.6	.9	.8	.4	3.3

=== College ===
†	Denotes seasons in which Birch won the CBI

Year	Team	GP	GS	MPG	FG%	3P%	FT%	RPG	APG	SPG	BPG	PPG
2011–12 †	Pittsburgh	10	6	15.0	**.571**	–	.545	5.0	.0	.2	1.9	4.4
2012–13	UNLV	26	15	21.8	.563	–	.642	5.7	.6	**.7**	2.6	7.2
2013–14	UNLV	**33**	**32**	**31.4**	.510	–	**.693**	**10.2**	**1.2**	.6	**3.8**	**11.5**
Career		69	53	25.4	.531	–	.668	7.8	.8	.6	3.1	8.9

== Personal life ==
Birch has three brothers, and attended high school at St. Thomas Aquinas Catholic High School in Russell, Ontario. Birch grew up a fan of the Toronto Raptors, watching their games on television and even driving five hours with his father to Toronto to watch a live game at the Air Canada Centre. He has been married since 2018 and has a daughter born in 2019. He also has two unnamed children from past relationships a daughter and son born between 2015 and 2016.
