= Fairview, Burlington County, New Jersey =

Fairview, Burlington County, New Jersey may refer to:

- Fairview, Delran, New Jersey
- Fairview, Medford, New Jersey
