= John Sacca =

American football player (born 1971)

Personal information
- Born: December 12, 1971 (age 54); Delran Township, New Jersey, U.S.
- Listed height: 6 ft 5 in (1.96 m)
- Listed weight: 230 lb (104 kg)

Career information
- NFL draft: 1995: undrafted

Career history
- New York Jets (1995)*; Connecticut Coyotes (1996)
- * Offseason or practice squad member only

John Sacca (born December 12, 1971) is an American former football quarterback in the Arena Football League (AFL) who played for the Connecticut Coyotes. He played college football for the Penn State Nittany Lions and Eastern Kentucky Colonels. He also played in the World League of American Football (WLAF) for the Amsterdam Admirals.

Raised in Delran Township, New Jersey, Sacca played prep football at Delran High School.

His brother Tony Sacca also was a quarterback at Penn State.
