= Cambridge, New Jersey =

Cambridge, New Jersey may refer to:

- Cambridge, a neighborhood located within Delran Township, New Jersey
- Cambridge, an incorrect name for Cambridge Park, Evesham Township, New Jersey
