= Jeremy Rafanello =

American soccer player (born 2000)

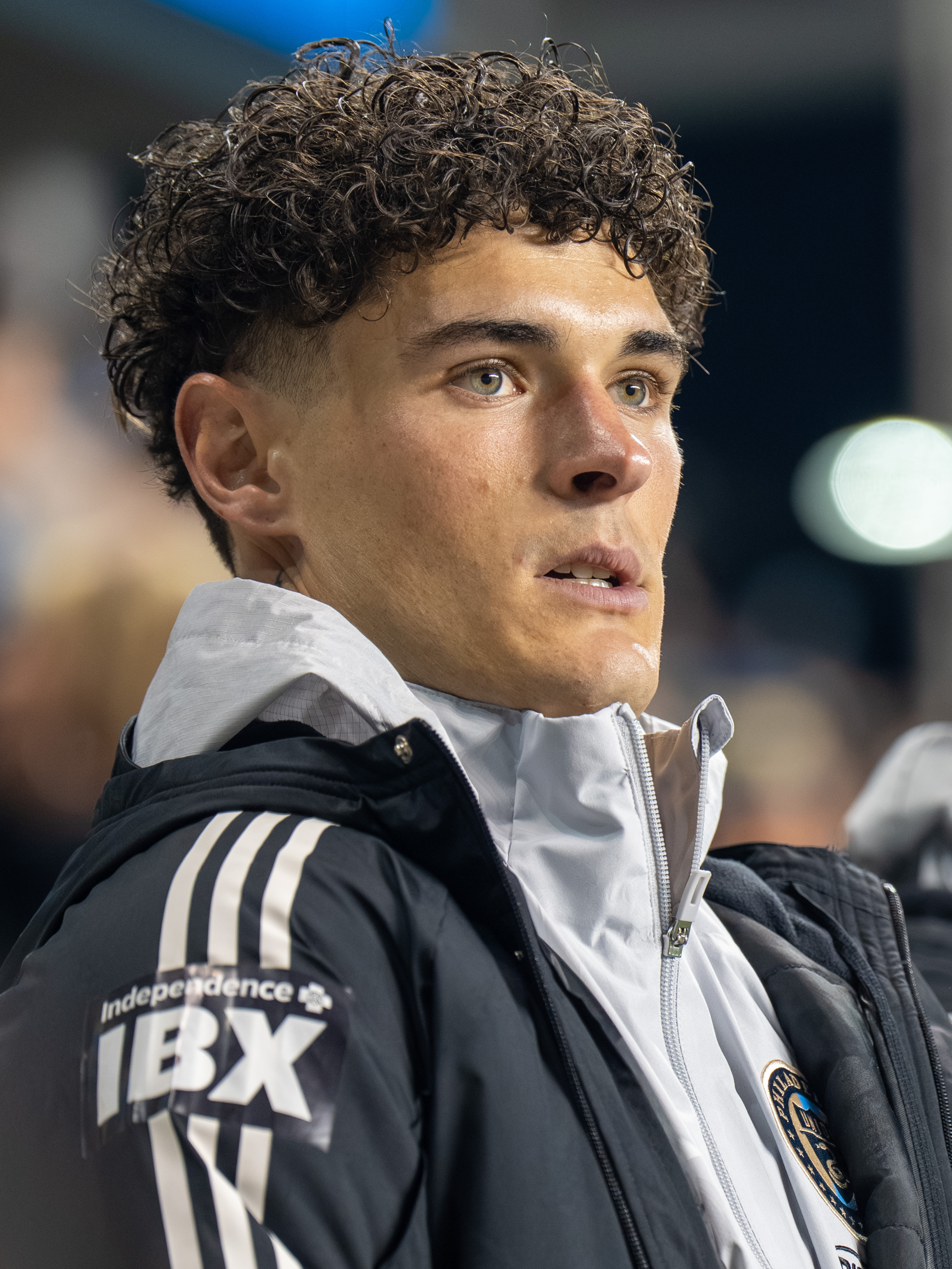
- Rafanello with the Philadelphia Union in 2025

Personal information
- Full name: Jeremy Michael Rafanello
- Date of birth: April 14, 2000 (age 26)
- Place of birth: Delran Township, New Jersey, United States
- Height: 6 ft 0 in (1.83 m)
- Positions: Forward; winger

Team information
- Current team: Philadelphia Union
- Number: 14

Youth career
- 2016–2017: FC DELCO
- 2017–2018: Philadelphia Union Academy

College career
Years	Team	Apps	(Gls)
2018	Penn State Nittany Lions	17	(3)

Senior career*
Years	Team	Apps	(Gls)
2018	Bethlehem Steel	24	(1)
2018–2019	Reading United	24	(2)
2019	Helsingør	13	(7)
2020	Indy Eleven	17	(4)
2021–2022	New York Red Bulls II	52	(11)
2022–	Philadelphia Union	19	(3)
2022–	Philadelphia Union II	51	(16)

International career
2018	United States U19	3	(1)
- * Club domestic league appearances and goals as of November 8, 2023

Jeremy Michael Rafanello (born April 14, 2000) is an American professional soccer player who plays as a forward and winger for the Philadelphia Union of Major League Soccer.

== Career ==
=== Early career ===
A native of Delran Township, New Jersey, Rafanello attended Delran High School while participating in the U.S. Soccer Development Academy, after playing a single year of high school soccer.

Rafanello appeared as an amateur player for United Soccer League side Bethlehem Steel during their 2018 season via the Philadelphia Union academy.

Rafanello committed to playing college soccer for the Penn State Nittany Lions from 2018 onward. In his one year with Penn State, he appeared in 18 matches scoring three goals.

=== FC Helsingør ===
After a trial at Danish club FC Helsingør, it was announced on July 11, 2019, that Rafanello had signed a 2-year contract.

=== Indy Eleven ===
On February 19, 2020, Rafanello returned to the United States, signing with USL Championship club Indy Eleven. On September 9, 2020, Rafanello scored his first goal as a professional in a 2–1 victory over Sporting Kansas City II.

=== New York Red Bulls II ===
On March 3, 2021, it was announced that Rafanello had signed with New York Red Bulls II. He made his debut for the club on April 30, 2021, starting in a 3–2 loss to Hartford Athletic. On June 16, 2021, Rafanello scored his first two goals for New York and also recorded an assist in a 3–1 victory over Charlotte Independence.

=== Philadelphia Union ===
Rafanello signed a Homegrown Player contract with the Philadelphia Union on August 23, 2022.

== International career ==
Rafanello made his international debut in 2018 for the United States under-19 team at the Slovakia Cup, with substitute appearances against Kazakhstan and the Czech Republic. In his lone start, he scored the game-winning goal in the 3–0 victory over Azerbaijan in the third place match.

== Honors ==
Philadelphia Union

- Supporters' Shield: 2025
