= 2017 MAAC women's basketball tournament =

- Classification: Division I
- Season: 2016–17
- Teams: 11
- Site: Times Union Center; Albany, NY
- Champions: Quinnipiac (2nd title)
- Winning coach: Tricia Fabbri (2nd title)
- MVP: Adily Martucci (Quinnipiac)
- Television: ESPNU/ESPN3

2016–17 MAAC women's basketball standings
	Conf.				Overall
Team	W		L	PCT	W		L	PCT
Quinnipiac †	17	–	3	.850	29	–	7	.806
Rider	16	–	4	.800	24	–	9	.727
Fairfield	13	–	7	.650	17	–	14	.548
Siena	13	–	7	.650	14	–	16	.467
Iona	12	–	8	.600	18	–	13	.581
Marist	11	–	9	.550	15	–	17	.469
Monmouth	9	–	11	.450	15	–	16	.484
Canisius	8	–	12	.400	10	–	21	.323
Niagara	5	–	15	.250	8	–	22	.267
Manhattan	4	–	16	.200	8	–	22	.267
Saint Peter's	2	–	18	.100	3	–	27	.100
† 2017 MAAC tournament winner As of March 25, 2017; Rankings from AP poll

The 2017 Metro Atlantic Athletic Conference women's basketball tournament was held March 2–6 at the Times Union Center in Albany, New York. The winner received an automatic trip to the 2017 Women's NCAA tournament.

== Seeds ==
Teams are seeded by conference record, with a ties broken by record between the tied teams followed by record against the regular-season champion, if necessary.

Seed	School	Conference	Tiebreaker
1	Quinnipiac	17–3	
2	Rider	16–4	
3	Fairfield	13–7	1–1 vs. Siena, 1–1 vs. Quin
4	Siena	13–7	1–1 vs. Fairfield, 0–2 vs. Quin
5	Iona	12–8	
6	Marist	11–9	
7	Monmouth	9–11	
8	Canisius	8–12	
9	Niagara	5–15	
10	Manhattan	4–16	
11	St. Peter's	2–18	

== Schedule ==
Session	Game	Time*	Matchup^{#}	Television	Attendance
First round – Thursday, March 2
1	1	9:30 AM	#8 Canisius vs #9 Niagara		
1	2	11:30 AM	#7 Monmouth vs #10 Manhattan		
1	3	1:30 PM	#6 Marist vs #11 St. Peter's		
Quarterfinals – Friday, March 3
2	4	1:00 PM	#1 Quinnipiac vs #8 Canisius		
2	5	3:30 PM	#2 Rider vs. #7 Monmouth		
Quarterfinals – Saturday, March 4
3	6	12:00 PM	#3 Fairfield vs #6 Marist		
3	7	2:30 PM	#4 Siena vs. #5 Iona		
Semifinals – Sunday, March 5
4	8	11:00 AM	#1 Quinnipiac vs #5 Iona	ESPN3	
4	9	1:30 PM	#2 Rider vs #3 Fairfield	ESPN3	
Championship – Monday, March 6
5	10	5:00 PM	#1 Quinnipiac 81 vs #2 Rider 73	ESPNU	
*Game times in ET. #-Rankings denote tournament seeding.

== Bracket ==
First round Thursday, March 2
8	Canisius	80^{OT}
9	Niagara	74
7	Monmouth	62
10	Manhattan	46
6	Marist	71
11	St. Peter's	60

Quarterfinals; Friday, March 3 Saturday, March 4
1	Quinnipiac	63
8	Canisius	58
4	Siena	47
5	Iona	67
2	Rider	67
7	Monmouth	51
3	Fairfield	61
6	Marist	44

Semifinals; Sunday, March 5 ESPN3
1	Quinnipiac	64
5	Iona	59
2	Rider	49
3	Fairfield	36

Championship; Monday, March 6 ESPNU
1	Quinnipiac	81
2	Rider	73

== See also ==
- Metro Atlantic Athletic Conference
- MAAC women's basketball tournament
- 2017 MAAC men's basketball tournament
