= Todd Lowber =

American gridiron football player (born 1982)

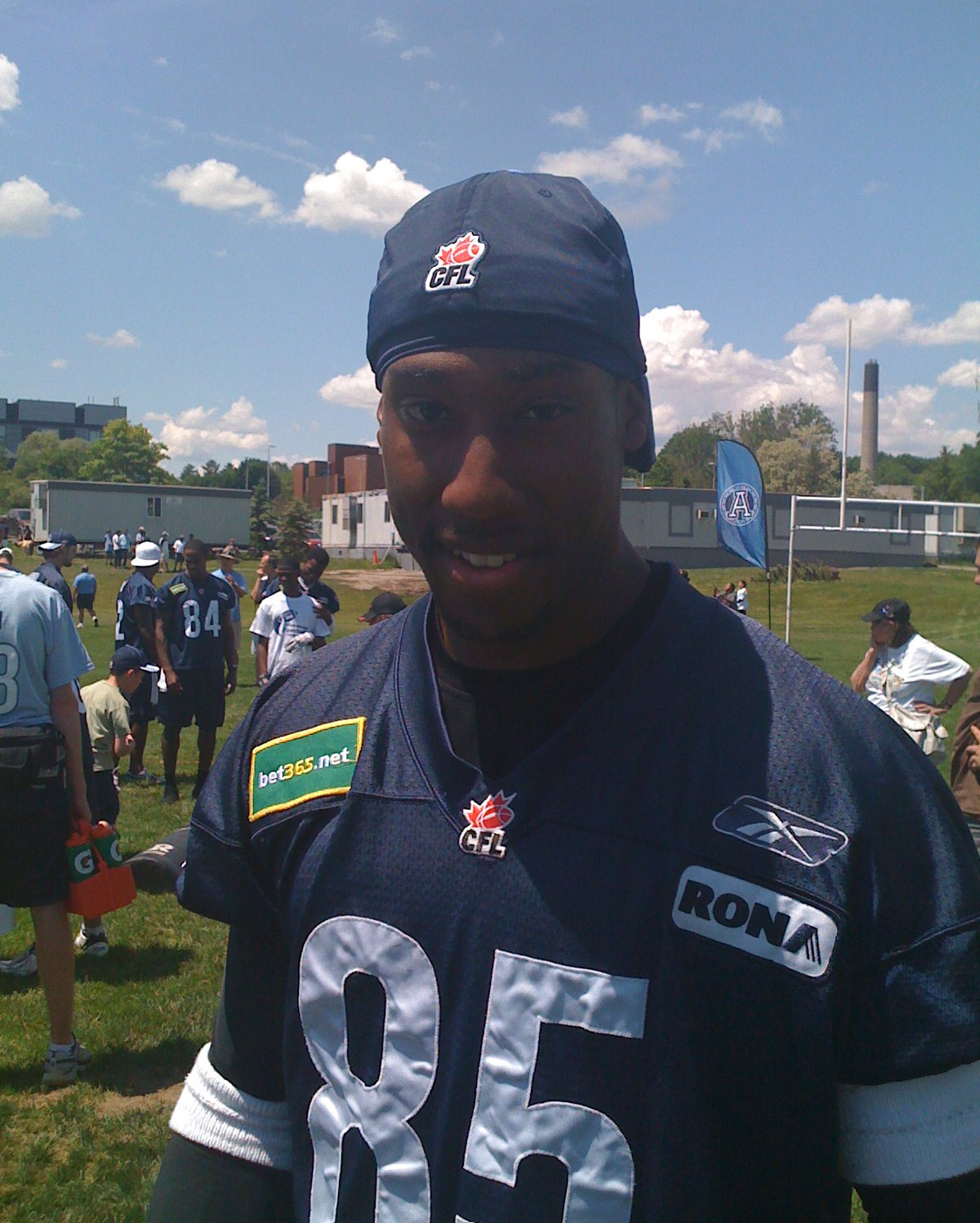
- Lowber at the Toronto Argonauts 2009 training camp

No. 86, 16, 85
- Position: Wide receiver

Personal information
- Born: January 26, 1982 (age 44); Camden, New Jersey, U.S.
- Listed height: 6 ft 3 in (1.91 m)
- Listed weight: 205 lb (93 kg)

Career information
- High school: Delran Township (NJ)
- College: Ramapo
- NFL draft: 2007: undrafted

Career history
- Minnesota Vikings (2007)*; New York Giants (2007–2008)*; Toronto Argonauts (2008)*; Dallas Cowboys (2008)*; Miami Dolphins (2008–2009)*; Toronto Argonauts (2009)*; Toronto Argonauts (2011)*
- * Offseason or practice squad member only

Awards and highlights
- Super Bowl champion (XLII)

Todd Lowber (born January 26, 1982) is an American former professional football wide receiver. He was signed by the Minnesota Vikings as an undrafted free agent in 2007. He was also a member of the New York Giants, Dallas Cowboys, Miami Dolphins, and Toronto Argonauts. He earned a Super Bowl ring as a member of the Giants' practice squad in Super Bowl XLII. He did not play college football but is a former college basketball player and high jump champion.

Lowber grew up in Delran Township, New Jersey and attended Delran High School.

== College career ==
Lowber played basketball for two seasons at Ramapo College in Mahwah, New Jersey as a guard and won the 2006 NCAA Division III men's high jump. Prior to transferring to Ramapo, Lowber played two seasons for Richard Stockton College of New Jersey.

== Professional football career ==
=== Minnesota Vikings ===
On April 18, 2007, Lowber signed a three-year contract with the Minnesota Vikings. They signed Lowber after their scout attended a combine that was set up by New Jersey sports attorney Jim Ulrich. Prior to signing with the Vikings, Lowber had no previous football experience. Lowber was waived on August 27, 2007.

=== New York Giants ===
He was signed to the New York Giants practice squad in September 2007. He was released by the team on June 23, 2008.

=== Toronto Argonauts (first stint) ===
Lowber was signed to the practice roster of the CFL's Toronto Argonauts on July 22, 2008.

=== Dallas Cowboys ===
Shortly after signing with the Argonauts, Lowber was signed by the Dallas Cowboys on July 28, 2008. His attempt to make the Cowboys was chronicled on the HBO series Hard Knocks: Training Camp with the Dallas Cowboys. On August 30, Lowber was waived from the Cowboys during final cuts.

=== Miami Dolphins ===
Lowber was signed to the practice squad of the Miami Dolphins on November 10, 2008. After finishing the season on the practice squad, he was re-signed by the Dolphins on January 5, 2009. He was waived on June 1, 2009.

=== Toronto Argonauts (second stint) ===
Lowber re-signed with the Argonauts on June 7, 2009. On June 14, 2009, Lowber suffered a concussion after being hit by Chris Jennings and Doug Goldsby of the Montreal Alouettes while returning a kick in the team's first pre-season game. Lowber lay on the field for 15 minutes before getting carted away. He was released on June 23, 2009.

=== Toronto Argonauts (third stint) ===
On April 21, 2011, Lowber re-signed with the Argonauts. He was later released on June 20, 2011.
