= Stephen M. Wolownik =

American expert in Russian music (1946-2000)

Wolownik Playing Spoons

Stephen M. "Steve" Wolownik (July 22, 1946 – May 18, 2000) was a pioneer in the Russian and Eastern European music community in the United States. He was a co-founder of the Balalaika and Domra Association of America.

== Biography ==
Born in Chester, Pennsylvania, Wolownik grew up with Russian and Ukrainian music. As a child and young adult, he participated in the balalaika orchestra at St. Nicholas's Russian Orthodox Church in Philadelphia under the tutelage of Paul Kauriga of the Kovriga Balalaika Orchestra. He also played under Anastasia Karnow.

Wolownik received a bachelor's degree from the University of Pennsylvania, where he founded the University of Pennsylvania Balalaika Orchestra (commonly known as "PennBO" or "Penn Balalaika Orchestra") in 1964. PennBO was unique in that, with the exception of the Tamburitzans at Pittsburgh's Duquesne University, it was the only university-level music ensemble dedicated solely to Eastern European music.

Wolownik at Home

He later moved to Los Angeles, where he received a master's degree in ethnomusicology from the University of California, Los Angeles. While there, he founded another balalaika group, the Odessa Balalaikas. Later, he founded balalaika groups in Houston and Atlanta.

After returning to Philadelphia from Los Angeles, Wolownik received a master's degree in library science from Drexel University, whereupon he worked as a reference librarian at the Lippincott Library of the Wharton School. He also co-founded two more balalaika ensembles, The Balalaika Russe and The Gypsy Balalaikas, the members of both of which were from the Philadelphia area.

Wolownik also continued directing the Penn Balalaika Orchestra until its demise in 1996.

He later moved to Mount Laurel, New Jersey, where he was an assistant library director at the Mount Laurel Public Library until his death. Wolownik died on May 18, 2000, at the age of 52 at his home in Delran Township, New Jersey. Wolownik is buried in Lawn Croft Cemetery in Linwood, Pennsylvania, in the shadow of his boyhood home.

== Influence ==
Wolownik is largely credited with reviving interest in the cabaret-style balalaika ensemble in the United States and reconnecting the balalaika and domra with their peasant roots. Popular in the 1910s and 1920s, the cabaret-style ensemble usually had no more than 10 members and played in small, intimate settings, often performing pieces which were not precisely Russian in appellation, but perhaps more Gypsy, Jewish, or Ukrainian in origin. The cabaret-style ensemble fell into disfavor with the rise of Communism, as Soviet government preferred huge Andreyev-style state-run ensembles with elaborate orchestral arrangements as sort of an antipode to the Western orchestra.

Wolownik, having established balalaika societies and groups in Atlanta, Maine, and Pennsylvania, was well known in the balalaika community in the United States and abroad for his simple yet deep arrangements of tunes for small balalaika ensembles. In keeping with the cabaret tradition, Wolownik did not limit himself strictly to Russian music, but also arranged Romanian, Hungarian, Moldavian, Gypsy, and klezmer tunes, some of which had never been played on anything other than the native instruments for which they were composed.

Despite his commitment to serious musicianship, some have claimed that Wolownik, who had an irreverent sense of humor, was a living embodiment of the skomorokhi of old Russia, street musicians who actively poked fun at both the Tsars and the Church.

The Balalaika and Domra Association of America now numbers several hundred members. It is actively involved in promoting traditional Russian music in the United States. It holds a yearly convention in which luminaries of Russian music participate by teaching and performing.
