= Delran Township School District =

School district in Burlington County, New Jersey, US

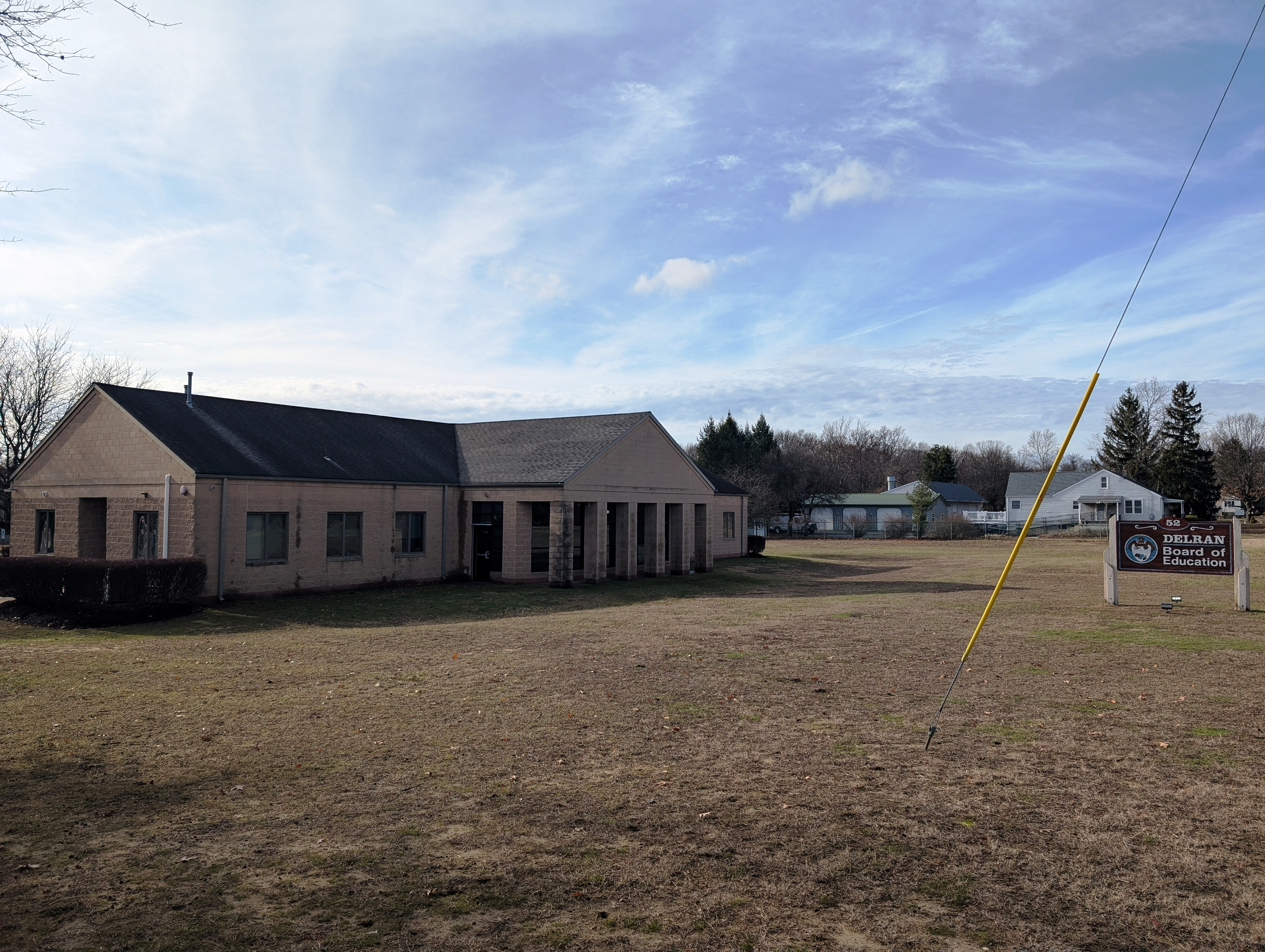

Address
- 52 Hartford Road Delran Township, Burlington County, New Jersey, 08075; United States
- Coordinates: 40.014645°N 74.94081°W

District information
- Grades: Pre-K to 12
- Superintendent: Lisa Della Vecchia (interim)
- Business administrator: Robert Delengowski (interim)
- Schools: 4

Students and staff
- Enrollment: 2,889 (as of 2023–24)
- Faculty: 261.9 FTEs
- Student–teacher ratio: 11.0:1

Other information
- District Factor Group: FG
- Website: www.delranschools.org
Ind.	Per pupil	District spending	Rank (*)	K-12 average	%± vs. average
1A	Total Spending	$16,345	15	$18,891	−13.5%
1	Budgetary Cost	12,320	12	14,783	−16.7%
2	Classroom Instruction	7,200	10	8,763	−17.8%
6	Support Services	1,922	21	2,392	−19.6%
8	Administrative Cost	1,237	6	1,485	−16.7%
10	Operations & Maintenance	1,603	35	1,783	−10.1%
13	Extracurricular Activities	354	22	268	32.1%
16	Median Teacher Salary	55,730	9	64,043
Data from NJDoE 2014 Taxpayers' Guide to Education Spending. *Of K-12 districts with 1,800-3,500 students. Lowest spending=1; Highest=68

The Delran Township School District is a comprehensive community public school district that serves students in pre-kindergarten through twelfth grade from Delran Township, in Burlington County, in the U.S. state of New Jersey.

As of the 2023–24 school year, the district, comprised of four schools, had an enrollment of 2,889 students and 261.9 classroom teachers (on an FTE basis), for a student–teacher ratio of 11.0:1.

The district had been classified by the New Jersey Department of Education as being in District Factor Group "FG", the fourth-highest of eight groupings. District Factor Groups organize districts statewide to allow comparison by common socioeconomic characteristics of the local districts. From lowest socioeconomic status to highest, the categories are A, B, CD, DE, FG, GH, I and J.

== History ==
Into the early 1970s, students from Delran Township and Delanco Township attended Riverside High School as part of sending/receiving relationships with the Riverside School District. Efforts to merge the three districts into a combined regional K-12 system were rejected in a November 1971 referendum, leading the Delran district to pursue efforts to create its own high school. The Delran sending relationship began in 1954. Delran High School, constructed at a cost of $6 million (equivalent to $35.1 million in 2024), opened for the 1975-76 school year.

== Schools ==
Schools in the district (with 2023–24 enrollment data from the National Center for Education Statistics) are:

Elementary schools

- Millbridge Elementary School with 662 students in grades PreK-2
  - Stacy Murphy, principal
- Delran Intermediate School with 580 students in grades 3-5
  - Kimberly Clark-Hickson, principal

Middle school

- Delran Middle School with 678 students in grades 6-8
  - Barry Saide, principal

High school

- Delran High School with 931 students in grades 9-12
  - Brian Stolarick, principal

== Administration ==
Core members of the district's administration are:

- Lisa Della Vecchia, superintendent
- John Deserable, interim business administrator

== Board of education ==
The district's board of education is comprised of nine members who set policy and oversee the fiscal and educational operation of the district through its administration. As a Type II school district, the board's trustees are elected directly by voters to serve three-year terms of office on a staggered basis, with three seats up for election each year held (since 2012) as part of the November general election. The board appoints a superintendent to oversee the district's day-to-day operations and a business administrator to supervise the business functions of the district.
