= Nate Hemsley =

American football player (born 1974)

No. 58, 54
- Position: Linebacker

Personal information
- Born: May 5, 1974 (age 52); Willingboro Township, New Jersey, U.S.
- Listed height: 6 ft 0 in (1.83 m)
- Listed weight: 228 lb (103 kg)

Career information
- High school: Delran (Delran Township, New Jersey)
- College: Syracuse
- NFL draft: 1997: undrafted

Career history
- Tennessee Oilers (1997)*; Dallas Cowboys (1997–1999); Miami Dolphins (2000–2001)*; Carolina Panthers (2001)
- * Offseason or practice squad member only

Awards and highlights
- All-Big East (1996)

Career NFL statistics
- Games played: 20
- Stats at Pro Football Reference

Nathaniel Richard Hemsley (born May 15, 1974) is an American former professional football player who was a linebacker in the National Football League (NFL) for the Dallas Cowboys, Miami Dolphins and Carolina Panthers. He played college football for the Syracuse Orange.

== Early life ==
Hemsley grew up in Delran Township, New Jersey and graduated from Delran High School in 1992

2. As a senior, he received second-team All-American, All-Freedom League, AllBurlington County and Defensive Player of the Year honors.

He accepted a football scholarship from Syracuse University. As a redshirt freshman in 1993, he was named the starting inside linebacker and led the team in total tackles with 81, while also tallying 2 tackles for loss, 2 passes defensed and one blocked kick.

In 1994, he was lost for the season with a knee injury he suffered in the season opener against the University of Oklahoma, where he had 10 tackles and one fumble recovery. As a junior, he started 11 games at outside linebacker, making 119 tackles (second on the team), 3.5 sacks.

As a senior, in 1996, he posted 106 tackles (led the team), 6 tackles for loss (third on the team), 3 sacks, 4 quarterback pressures, 3 passes defensed, while being named First-team All-Big East.

== Professional career ==
=== Houston Oilers ===
Hemsley was signed as an undrafted free agent by the Houston Oilers after the 1997 NFL draft on April 21. He was waived on August 13.

=== Dallas Cowboys ===
On September 3, 1997, he was signed to the Dallas Cowboys' practice squad. On December 10, he was promoted to the active roster for the last 2 games to play on special teams. On August 31, 1998, he was re-signed by the Cowboys. After appearing in three games playing on the short-yardage defense and on special teams, he was injured while covering a punt and was placed on the injured reserve list with a dislocated right ankle and a broken leg on October 5. He was cut by the Cowboys on October 27, 1999.

=== Miami Dolphins ===
Over a year later, on November 14, 2000, he was signed by the Miami Dolphins to their practice squad. On February 19, 2001, he was re-signed to a two-year contract. He was then cut on August 28.

=== Carolina Panthers ===
On October 3, 2001, he was signed by the Carolina Panthers. He appeared in 9 games (3 starts), before being released on March 20, 2002.
