= 2016–17 South Carolina Gamecocks women's basketball team =

Intercollegiate basketball season

2016–17 South Carolina Gamecocks women's basketball

NCAA tournament National Champions SEC Tournament champions SEC regular season champions
- Conference: Southeastern Conference

Ranking
- Coaches: No. 1
- AP: No. 3
- Record: 33–4 (14–2 SEC)
- Head coach: Dawn Staley (9th season)
- Assistant coaches: Lisa Boyer; Nikki McCray-Penson; Fred Chmiel
- Home arena: Colonial Life Arena

2016–17 SEC women's basketball standings
	Conf.				Overall
Team	W		L	PCT	W		L	PCT
No. 3 South Carolina†	14	–	2	.875	33	–	4	.892
No. 7 Mississippi State	13	–	3	.813	34	–	5	.872
No. 18 Kentucky	11	–	5	.688	22	–	11	.667
No. 25 Missouri	11	–	5	.688	21	–	11	.656
Tennessee	10	–	6	.625	20	–	12	.625
Texas A&M	9	–	7	.563	22	–	12	.647
LSU	8	–	8	.500	20	–	12	.625
Auburn	7	–	9	.438	17	–	15	.531
Georgia	7	–	9	.438	16	–	15	.516
Ole Miss	6	–	10	.375	17	–	14	.548
Alabama	5	–	11	.313	22	–	14	.611
Florida	5	–	11	.313	15	–	16	.484
Vanderbilt	4	–	12	.250	14	–	16	.467
Arkansas	2	–	14	.125	13	–	17	.433
† 2017 SEC tournament winner Rankings from AP poll

The 2016–17 South Carolina Gamecocks women's basketball team represented the University of South Carolina during the 2016–17 NCAA Division I women's basketball season. The Gamecocks, led by ninth-year head coach Dawn Staley, played their home games at the Colonial Life Arena and were members of the Southeastern Conference. They finished the season 33–4, 11–2 in SEC play to win their fourth consecutive SEC regular season and third consecutive tournament championship to earn an automatic bid to the NCAA women's tournament. They defeated UNC Ashville and Arizona State in the first and second rounds, Quinnipiac in the sweet sixteen and Florida State in the elite eight to advance to their second final four in school history. In the national semifinal in Dallas they defeated Stanford and beat SEC rival Mississippi State in the final to win their first NCAA National Championship. A'ja Wilson was named the Most Outstanding Player in the National Championship Game.

== Roster ==
2016–17 South Carolina Gamecocks women's basketball team
Players
Coaches

Pos.	#	Name	Height	Year	Previous school	Hometown
G	0	Victoria Patrick	5 ft 8 in (1.73 m)	Fr	Edgewater	Orlando, FL
G	1	Bianca Cuevas-Moore	5 ft 6 in (1.68 m)	Jr	Nazareth Regional	Bronx, NY
G	3	Kaela Davis	6 ft 2 in (1.88 m)	RS Jr	Buford; Georgia Tech	Suwanee, GA
G	4	Doniyah Cliney	6 ft 0 in (1.83 m)	RS So	Malcolm X Shabazz	Newark, NJ
G	10	Allisha Gray	6 ft 0 in (1.83 m)	RS Jr	Washington County; North Carolina	Sandersville, GA
G	12	Araion Bradshaw	5 ft 6 in (1.68 m)	Fr	Tabor Academy	Hyde Park, MA
G	15	Tiffany Davis	5 ft 7 in (1.7 m)	RS Jr	Westbury Christian	Houston, TX
F	21	Mikiah Herbert Harrigan	6 ft 2 in (1.88 m)	Fr	Flanagan	Pembroke Pines, FL
F	22	A'ja Wilson	6 ft 5 in (1.96 m)	Jr	Heathwood Hall	Hopkins, SC
F	35	Alexis Jennings (redshirt)	6 ft 2 in (1.88 m)	Jr	Sparkman; Kentucky	Madison, AL
C	41	Alaina Coates	6 ft 4 in (1.93 m)	Sr	Dutch Fork	Irmo, SC
G	44	India Farmer	6 ft 0 in (1.83 m)	Sr	North Myrtle Beach	North Myrtle Beach, SC
G	52	Tyasha Harris	5 ft 10 in (1.78 m)	Fr	Heritage Christian	Noblesville, IN

Head coach

- Dawn Staley (Virginia)

Assistant coach(es)

- Lisa Boyer (Ithaca)
- Nikki McCray-Penson (Tennessee)
- Fred Chmiel (Alaska–Anchorage)

Legend

- (C) Team captain
- (S) Suspended
- (I) Ineligible
- (W) Walk-on
- Injured
- Current redshirt

Roster

== Schedule ==
Date time, TV	Rank^{#}	Opponent^{#}	Result	Record	Site (attendance) city, state
Exhibition
11/06/2016*; 1:30 pm	No. 4	Benedict	W 120–49		Colonial Life Arena; Columbia, SC
Regular season
11/14/2016*; 6:00 pm	No. 4	at No. 7 Ohio State	W 92–80	1–0	Value City Arena (6,683); Columbus, OH
11/20/2016*; 3:00 pm	No. 4	Hampton; Hall of Fame Women's Challenge	W 92–38	2–0	Colonial Life Arena (11,795); Columbia, SC
11/21/2016*; 7:00 pm	No. 3	Maine; Hall of Fame Women's Challenge	W 79–42	3–0	Colonial Life Arena (11,057); Columbia, SC
11/22/2016*; 7:00 pm	No. 3	Saint Peter's; Hall of Fame Women's Challenge	W 93–38	4–0	Colonial Life Arena (11,455); Columbia, SC
11/27/2016*; 1:00 pm, ESPN2	No. 3	vs. No. 4 Louisville; Hall of Fame Women's Challenge	W 83–59	5–0	MassMutual Center; Springfield, MA
12/01/2016*; 7:00 pm, ESPN2	No. 3	at No. 14 Texas; Big 12/SEC Women's Challenge	W 76–67	6–0	Frank Erwin Center (3,330); Austin, TX
12/04/2016*; 2:00 pm, ACCN Extra	No. 3	at Duke	L 63–74	6–1	Cameron Indoor Stadium (6,036); Durham, NC
12/11/2016*; 3:00 pm, SECN	No. 6	Minnesota	W 98–58	7–1	Colonial Life Arena (12,461); Columbia, SC
12/15/2016*; 7:00 pm, SECN	No. 6	Clemson; Rivalry	W 83–61	8–1	Colonial Life Arena (11,916); Columbia, SC
12/18/2016*; 2:00 pm, ESPN2	No. 6	No. 9 UCLA	W 66–57	9–1	Colonial Life Arena (13,367); Columbia, SC
12/21/2016*; 6:00 pm	No. 6	at Savannah State	W 70–30	10–1	Tiger Arena (1,411); Savannah, GA
01/01/2017; 2:00 pm, ESPN2	No. 6	Alabama	W 93–45	11–1 (1–0)	Colonial Life Arena (12,069); Columbia, SC
01/05/2017; 7:00 pm	No. 5	at Auburn	W 73–47	12–1 (2–0)	Auburn Arena (2,144); Auburn, AL
01/08/2017; 12:00 pm, ESPNU	No. 5	at Florida	W 81–62	13–1 (3–0)	O'Connell Center (2,232); Gainesville, FL
01/12/2017; 7:00 pm, SECN	No. 5	Georgia	W 66–63	14–1 (4–0)	Colonial Life Arena (12,043); Columbia, SC
01/15/2017; 3:00 pm	No. 5	at LSU	W 84–61	15–1 (5–0)	Maravich Center (2,840); Baton Rouge, LA
01/19/2017; 7:00 pm, SECN	No. 5	Ole Miss	W 65–46	16–1 (6–0)	Colonial Life Arena (12,518); Columbia, SC
01/23/2017; 7:00 pm, ESPN2	No. 5	No. 4 Mississippi State	W 64–61	17–1 (7–0)	Colonial Life Arena (13,120); Columbia, SC
01/26/2017; 7:00 pm, SECN	No. 5	Georgia	W 62–44	18–1 (8–0)	Stegeman Coliseum (3,540); Athens, GA
01/30/2017; 7:00 pm, ESPN2	No. 4	Tennessee	L 74–76	18–2 (8–1)	Colonial Life Arena (13,690); Columbia, SC
02/02/2017; 7:00 pm, SECN	No. 4	at No. 25 Kentucky	W 75–63	19–2 (9–1)	Memorial Coliseum (5,533); Lexington, KY
02/05/2017; 2:00 pm, ESPN2	No. 4	at Arkansas	W 79–49	20–2 (10–1)	Bud Walton Arena (1,650); Fayetteville, AR
02/09/2017; 7:00 pm	No. 6	Auburn	W 60–41	21–2 (11–1)	Colonial Life Arena (13,360); Columbia, SC
02/13/2017*; 9:00 pm, ESPN2	No. 6	at No. 1 Connecticut	L 55–66	21–3	Gampel Pavilion (10,167); Storrs, CT
02/16/2017; 7:00 pm, SECN	No. 6	Vanderbilt	W 82–51	22–3 (12–1)	Colonial Life Arena (13,089); Columbia, SC
02/19/2017; 3:00 pm, ESPN2	No. 6	at Missouri	L 60–62	22–4 (12–2)	Mizzou Arena (5,789); Columbia, MO
02/23/2017; 9:00 pm, SECN	No. 7	at Texas A&M	W 80–64	23–4 (13–2)	Reed Arena (6,402); College Station, TX
02/26/2017; 2:00 pm, ESPNU	No. 7	No. 22 Kentucky	W 95–87	24–4 (14–2)	Colonial Life Arena (18,000); Columbia, SC
SEC women's tournament
03/03/2017; 12:00 pm, SECN	(1) No. 5	vs. (8) Georgia; Quarterfinals	W 72–48	25–4	Bon Secours Wellness Arena; Greenville, SC
03/04/2017; 5:00 pm, ESPNU	(1) No. 5	vs. (4) No. 20 Kentucky; Semifinals	W 89–77	26–4	Bon Secours Wellness Arena (7,554); Greenville, SC
03/05/2017; 2:30 pm, ESPN2	(1) No. 5	vs. (2) No. 6 Mississippi State; Championship Game	W 59–49	27–4	Bon Secours Wellness Arena (7,715); Greenville, SC
NCAA women's tournament
03/17/2017*; 5:00 pm, ESPN2	(1 S) No. 3	(16 S) UNC Asheville; First Round	W 90–40	28–4	Colonial Life Arena; Columbia, SC
03/19/2017*; 7:00 pm, ESPN	(1 S) No. 3	(8 S) Arizona State; Second Round	W 71–68	29–4	Colonial Life Arena (8,276); Columbia, SC
03/25/2017*; 4:00 pm, ESPN	(1 S) No. 3	vs. (12 S) Quinnipiac; Sweet Sixteen	W 100–58	30–4	Stockton Arena; Stockton, CA
03/27/2017*; 9:00 pm, ESPN	(1 S) No. 3	vs. (3 S) No. 10 Florida State; Elite Eight	W 71–64	31–4	Stockton Arena (3,134); Stockton, CA
03/31/2017*; 7:30 pm, ESPN2	(1 S) No. 3	vs. (2 L) No. 6 Stanford; Final Four	W 62–53	32–4	American Airlines Center; Dallas, TX
04/02/2017*; 6:00 pm, ESPN	(1 S) No. 3	vs. (2 O) No. 7 Mississippi State; Championship Game	W 67–55	33–4	American Airlines Center (19,229); Dallas, TX
*Non-conference game. ^{#}Rankings from AP Poll. (#) Tournament seedings in parentheses. S=Stockton Region. All times are in Eastern Time.

== Rankings ==
Ranking movement Legend: ██ Increase in ranking. ██ Decrease in ranking. NR = Not ranked. RV = Received votes.
Poll	Pre	Wk 2	Wk 3	Wk 4	Wk 5	Wk 6	Wk 7	Wk 8	Wk 9	Wk 10	Wk 11	Wk 12	Wk 13	Wk 14	Wk 15	Wk 16	Wk 17	Wk 18	Wk 19	Final
AP	4	4	3	3	6	6	6	6	5	5	5	5	4	6	6	7	5	4	3	N/A
Coaches	3	3	3	3	6	6	6	6	5	5	5	4	6	6	5	7	5	4	4	1

== Team players drafted into the WNBA ==
Round	Pick	Player	WNBA club
1	2	Alaina Coates	Chicago Sky
1	4	Allisha Gray	Dallas Wings
1	10	Kaela Davis	Dallas Wings

== See also ==
- 2016–17 South Carolina Gamecocks men's basketball team
