= Bill Duff =

American football player (born 1974)

- Born: February 24, 1974 (age 52)
- Other names: "Big Bill"
- Education: Sociology (University of Tennessee, 1997)
- Occupation: Actor (current)
- Known for: Professional football player, wrestler, actor, martial arts
- Height: 6 ft 4 in (193 cm)
- Title: Host

Bill Duff (born February 24, 1974) is a former National Football League, NFL Europe, and Arena Football League defensive tackle, and host of Human Weapon on the History Channel. He holds a brown belt in Tang Soo Do, a Korean martial art he refers to as "Korean Street Fighting".

Duff grew up in Delran Township, New Jersey and attended Delran High School, where he was also an All-American wrestler.

Duff was the co-captain of the 1997 Tennessee Volunteers. He played for the Cleveland Browns in their expansion year. He started for the Orlando Rage in the XFL and played in 2002 for the Berlin Thunder of NFL Europe. He later played in the Arena Football League for the Indiana Firebirds and Columbus Destroyers.
