= Tony Sacca =

American football player (born 1970)

No. 19
- Position: Quarterback

Personal information
- Born: April 17, 1970 (age 56); Delran Township, New Jersey, U.S.
- Listed height: 6 ft 5 in (1.96 m)
- Listed weight: 230 lb (104 kg)

Career information
- High school: Delran
- College: Penn State
- NFL draft: 1992: 2nd round, 46th overall pick

Career history
- Phoenix Cardinals (1992–1993); Barcelona Dragons (1995-1996)

Awards and highlights
- First-team All-East (1991)

Career NFL statistics
- TD–INT: 0-2
- Passing yards: 29
- Yards per average: 2.64
- Stats at Pro Football Reference

Anthony John Sacca (born April 17, 1970) is an American former professional football player who was a quarterback for the Phoenix Cardinals of the National Football League (NFL). He played college football for the Penn State Nittany Lions from 1988 to 1991 and was selected 46th overall in the second round of the 1992 NFL draft. He also played two seasons for the Barcelona Dragons in Spain.

Sacca grew up in Delran Township, New Jersey, and played high school football at Delran High School.
