= Tricia Fabbri =

American basketball coach

Biographical details
- Born: Delran Township, New Jersey, U.S.

Playing career
- 1988–1991: Fairfield
- Position: Forward

Coaching career (HC unless noted)
- 1991–1995: Fairfield (asst.)
- 1995–2026: Quinnipiac

Head coaching record
- Overall: 571–362 (.612)

Accomplishments and honors

Championships
- 2× NEC regular season (2008, 2013); 7× MAAC regular season (2014–2019, 2026); NEC tournament (2013); 4× MAAC tournament (2015, 2017–2019)

Awards
- 5× MAAC Coach of the Year; 3× NEC Coach of the Year; South Jersey Women’s Basketball Hall of Fame (2006); MAAC 25th Anniversary Team; Fairfield University Athletic Hall of Fame (1998); Connecticut Women’s Basketball Hall of Fame (2002); 3× First-team All-MAAC (1989–1991); MAAC All-Freshman Team (1988)

Tricia Fabbri is an American basketball coach who is the former head coach of women's basketball at Quinnipiac University.

Fabbri grew up in Delran Township, New Jersey and graduated from Delran High School in 1987.

== Playing career ==
Fabbri played college basketball at Fairfield University, where she set a school record in points scored in a game with 35 versus Memphis University, scored 1,622 points and grabbed 1,037 rebounds en route to being named to the All-Rookie Team in 1988–89 and to the MAAC All-Conference First Team the following three seasons. Her team won two MAAC Championships and subsequent automatic bids to the NCAA Women's Basketball Championships in 1990 and 1991. She was elected to the Fairfield University Athletic Hall of Fame in 1998 and named to the MAAC 25th Anniversary Team in 2005.

Fabbri received her bachelor's degree from Fairfield University in 1991.

== Coaching career ==
Fabbri began her coaching career as an assistant at Fairfield from 1991 to 1995. Since taking over the helm at Quinnipiac in 1995, Fabbri has become the all-time winningest coach in Quinnipiac program history with a 379–276 (.579) overall and a 255–152 (.627) conference record. From 2012 to 2017, Fabbri has led Quinnipiac to two 30 plus win seasons, four conference regular season championships, three conference tournament championships (2016–17, 2014–15 MAAC & 2012–13 NEC), three NCAA Tournament berths (2016–17 Sweet 16), and two WNIT berths. She has been a five-time conference coach of the year (2015–16, 2014–15 MAAC & 2012–13, 2005–06, 2000–01 NEC).

Quinnipiac announced on March 16, 2026 that Fabbri would retire at the conclusion of the 2025–26 season.

Sources:

- Quinnipiac Record Book
- Northeast-10 Record Book
- Tricia Fabbri bio
- NEC Standings 1998–2012
- MAAC 2013–15 Women's Basketball Standings

== Head coaching record ==
Record table
| Season | Team | Overall | Conference | Standing | Postseason |
|---|---|---|---|---|---|
Quinnipiac Bobcats (Northeast-10 Conference) (1995–1998)
| 1995–96 | Quinnipiac | 2–23 | 1–15 | 9th | |
| 1996–97 | Quinnipiac | 6–19 | 5–13 | 9th | |
| 1997–98 | Quinnipiac | 7–20 | 6–14 | 11th | |
Quinnipiac Bobcats (Northeast Conference) (1998–2013)
| 1998–99 | Quinnipiac | 9–18 | 9–11 | T-6th | |
| 1999–2000 | Quinnipiac | 9–18 | 6–12 | T-9th | |
| 2000–01 | Quinnipiac | 16–13 | 12–6 | 2nd | |
| 2001–02 | Quinnipiac | 13–14 | 10–8 | 6th | |
| 2002–03 | Quinnipiac | 18–10 | 14–4 | 2nd | |
| 2003–04 | Quinnipiac | 18–11 | 11–7 | T-3rd | |
| 2004–05 | Quinnipiac | 16–13 | 12–6 | 5th | |
| 2005–06 | Quinnipiac | 22–8 | 15–3 | T-2nd | |
| 2006–07 | Quinnipiac | 16–12 | 10–8 | T–4th | |
| 2007–08 | Quinnipiac | 25–6 | 16–2 | 1st | WNIT First Round |
| 2008–09 | Quinnipiac | 18–11 | 11–7 | T-3rd | |
| 2009–10 | Quinnipiac | 12–18 | 7–11 | 8th | |
| 2010–11 | Quinnipiac | 14–16 | 1–7 | T-5th | |
| 2011–12 | Quinnipiac | 22–10 | 13–5 | 2nd | WNIT First Round |
| 2012–13 | Quinnipiac | 30–3 | 18–0 | 1st | NCAA First Round |
Quinnipiac Bobcats (Metro Atlantic Athletic Conference) (2013–2026)
| 2013–14 | Quinnipiac | 21–13 | 14–6 | 4th | WNIT First Round |
| 2014–15 | Quinnipiac | 31–4 | 14–6 | 1st | NCAA First Round |
| 2015–16 | Quinnipiac | 25–9 | 17–3 | 1st | WNIT Second Round |
| 2016–17 | Quinnipiac | 29–7 | 17–3 | 1st | NCAA Sweet Sixteen |
| 2017–18 | Quinnipiac | 28–6 | 18–0 | 1st | NCAA Second Round |
| 2018–19 | Quinnipiac | 26–7 | 18–0 | 1st | NCAA First Round |
| 2019–20 | Quinnipiac | 15–14 | 12–8 | T-3rd | |
| 2020–21 | Quinnipiac | 13–7 | 11–5 | 2nd | |
| 2021–22 | Quinnipiac | 21–12 | 14–6 | T–2nd | WNIT Second Round |
| 2022–23 | Quinnipiac | 21–9 | 16–4 | 2nd | |
| 2023–24 | Quinnipiac | 13–18 | 9–11 | 7th | |
| 2024–25 | Quinnipiac | 28–5 | 18–2 | 2nd | WBIT First Round |
| 2025–26 | Quinnipiac | 27–7 | 19–1 | T–1st | WBIT Second Round |
| Quinnipiac: | | 571–362 (.612) | 390–189 (.674) | | |
| Total: | | 571–362 (.612) | | | |
National champion Postseason invitational champion Conference regular season champion Conference regular season and conference tournament champion Division regular season champion Division regular season and conference tournament champion Conference tournament champion
