= St. Thomas Aquinas Catholic High School (Russell, Ontario) =

Location
- 1211 South Russell Road; Russell, Ontario, K4R 1E5; Canada; 45.2511°N 75.3532°W

Information
- School type: Parochial secondary
- Religious affiliation: Roman Catholic
- Authority: Catholic District School Board of Eastern Ontario
- Principal: Lucie Matte-Hogue
- Chaplain: Christopher Vonesch
- Faculty: 60
- Grades: 7-12
- Colors: Maroon, White and Black
- Sports: Rugby, Football, Basketball, Badminton, Volleyball, Soccer ETC.
- Nickname: Ravens
- Website: www.sta-russell.cdsbeo.on.ca

St. Thomas Aquinas Catholic High School is a Catholic secondary school located in Russell, Ontario, under the jurisdiction of the Catholic District School Board of Eastern Ontario. The school also enrolls students from nearby towns such as Embrun, Casselman, Chesterville, Winchester, Morewood and others.

The school has implemented a school uniform by McCarthy School Uniforms.

Construction of the school started in 2003, with the school opening in 2004. There have been several expansions since.

The school's sports teams are called the Ravens.

== See also ==
- Education in Ontario
- List of secondary schools in Ontario
