= Human Weapon =

- Genre: Sports, History, Fighting
- Created by: Terry Bullman; Bullman's Krav Maga; Knoxville, TN
- Narrated by: Bill Duff; Jason Chambers
- Country of origin: United States
- Original language: English
- No. of seasons: 1
- No. of episodes: 15

Original release
- Network: History Channel
- Release: July 20 – December 21, 2007

Human Weapon is a television show on History Channel that premiered on July 20, 2007. The hosts, Jason Chambers and Bill Duff, traveled around the world studying the unique martial arts, or styles of fighting, that have origins in the region.

Each episode usually consisted of a brief introduction regarding the featured martial art, including footage of established fighters sparring. The hosts would then travel to various locations, learning several strikes, blocks, or other techniques valuable to the particular art from various instructors and/or masters. Along the way, they learned about the origins and cultural history of each fighting style. To help the viewer understand the moves the hosts learn, each technique was visually broken down with a motion capture element. Creator Terry Bullman also acted as stuntman for motion capture. After practicing featured aspects of the art, the hosts typically assessed the various skills and their effectiveness. At the end of each episode, one of the hosts would fight a representative of the episode's fighting style.

The show is similar to a later program called "Fight Quest". Lucie Bertaud also had a similar show called Face a Face which was done in France.

The show was cancelled in August 2008.

== Episodes and airdates ==
Episode #	Country	Martial art/episode title	Original airdate
1	Thailand	Muay Thai	July 20, 2007
2	Philippines	Arnis	July 27, 2007
3	Okinawa (Japan)	Karate	August 3, 2007
4	France	Savate	August 10, 2007
5	Japan	Judo	August 17, 2007
6	Greece	Pankration	August 24, 2007
7	Israel	Krav Maga	August 31, 2007
8	United States	Marine Corps Martial Arts	September 21, 2007
9	United States	Mixed Martial Arts	September 28, 2007
10	China	Kung Fu (Sanda)	November 2, 2007
11	Russia	Sambo	November 9, 2007
12	Cambodia	Pradal Serey	November 16, 2007
13	Malaysia	Silat Melayu	November 23, 2007
14	Cambodia	Bokator	November 30, 2007
15	South Korea	Taekwondo	December 14, 2007
16	Japan	Ninjutsu	December 21, 2007

== See also ==
- Fight Quest
- Fight Science
- Kill Arman
