= Delran Township, New Jersey =

Township in Burlington County, New Jersey, US

- Township
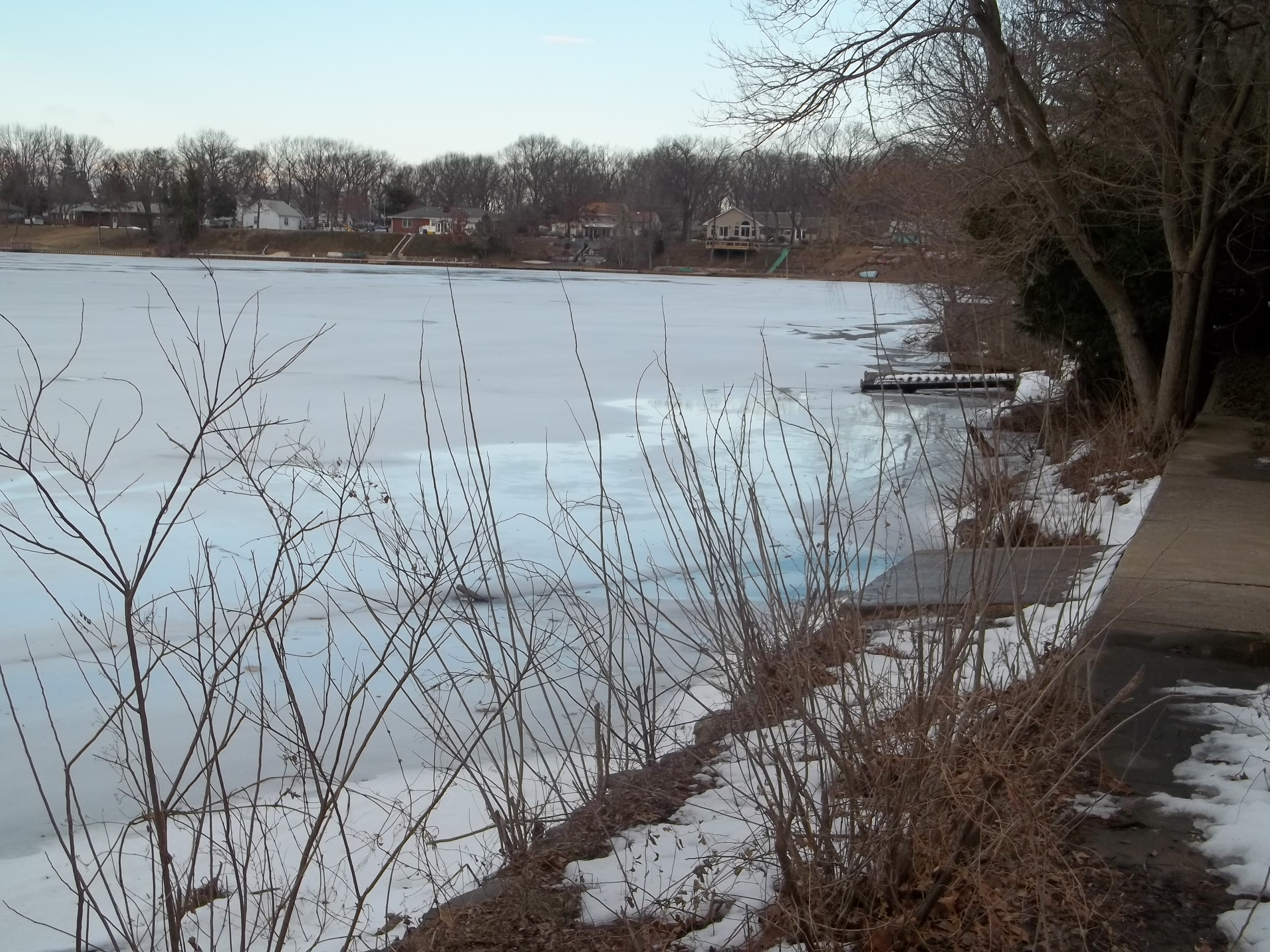
- Swede's Lake

- Seal

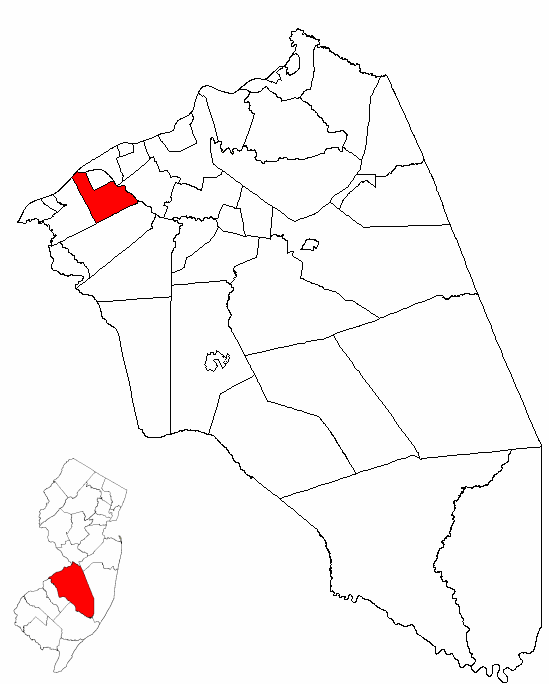
- Location of Delran Township in Burlington County highlighted in red (right). Inset map: Location of Burlington County in New Jersey highlighted in red (left).

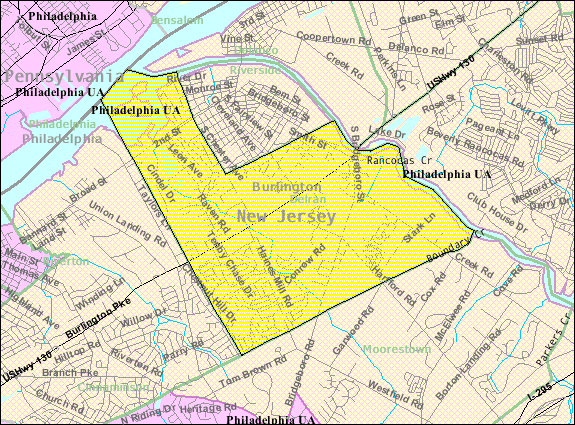
- Census Bureau map of Delran Township, New Jersey

- Location in Burlington County Location in New Jersey Location in the United States
- Coordinates: 40.013024°N 74.947423°W
- Country: United States
- State: New Jersey
- County: Burlington
- Incorporated: February 12, 1880
- Named for: DELaware River and RANcocas Creek

Government
  - Type: Mayor-Council
  - Body: Township Council
  - Mayor: Barnes Hutchins (R, term of office ends December 31, 2028)
  - Administrator: Joseph Bellina
  - Municipal clerk: Jamey Eggers

Area
  - Total: 7.25 sq mi (18.78 km^{2})
  - Land: 6.63 sq mi (17.17 km^{2})
  - Water: 0.62 sq mi (1.61 km^{2}) 8.58%
  - Rank: 240th of 565 in state 24th of 40 in county
- Elevation: 69 ft (21 m)

Population (2020)
  - Total: 17,882
  - Estimate (2023): 18,291
  - Rank: 150th of 565 in state 9th of 40 in county
  - Density: 2,697.1/sq mi (1,041.4/km^{2})
  - Rank: 240th of 565 in state 12th of 40 in county
- Time zone: UTC−05:00 (Eastern (EST))
  - Summer (DST): UTC−04:00 (Eastern (EDT))
- ZIP Code: 08075
- Area code: 856 exchanges: 461, 764, 824
- FIPS code: 3400517440
- GNIS feature ID: 0882097
- Website: www.delrantownship.org

Delran Township is a township in Burlington County, in the U.S. state of New Jersey. As of the 2020 United States census, the township's population was 17,882, an increase of 986 (+5.8%) from the 2010 census count of 16,896, which in turn reflected an increase of 1,360 (+8.8%) from the 15,536 counted in the 2000 census. The township, and all of Burlington County, is a part of the Philadelphia metropolitan area.

Delran Township was incorporated as a township by an act of the New Jersey Legislature on February 12, 1880, from portions of Cinnaminson Township. Portions of the township were taken to create Riverside Township on February 20, 1895.

The township's name is a portmanteau of the names of the two waterways that have their confluence here: the Delaware River and Rancocas Creek.

== Geography ==
According to the United States Census Bureau, the township had a total area of 7.25 square miles (18.78 km^{2}), including 6.63 square miles (17.17 km^{2}) of land and 0.62 square miles (1.61 km^{2}) of water (8.58%).

The township borders Cinnaminson Township, Delanco Township, Moorestown Township, Riverside Township and Willingboro Township in Burlington County; and Philadelphia in Pennsylvania, across the Delaware River.

Unincorporated communities, localities and place names located partially or completely within the township include Bridgeboro, Cambridge, Chesterville, Fairview, Milltown and Riverside Park.

== Demographics ==
Historical population
Census	Pop.	Note	%±
1880	1,760		—
1890	2,267		28.8%
1900	890	*	−60.7%
1910	1,031		15.8%
1920	1,475		43.1%
1930	2,015		36.6%
1940	1,926		−4.4%
1950	2,447		27.1%
1960	5,327		117.7%
1970	10,065		88.9%
1980	14,811		47.2%
1990	13,178		−11.0%
2000	15,536		17.9%
2010	16,896		8.8%
2020	17,882		5.8%
2023 (est.)	18,291		2.3%
Population sources: 1880–2000; 1880–1920 1880–1890; 1890–1910 1910–1930; 1940–2000 2000; 2010 2020 * = Lost territory in previous decade.

=== 2020 census ===
The 2020 United States census counted 17,882 people, about 6,233 households and about 4,336 families. The population density was 2,697.1 per square mile (1041.4/km2). There were 6,763 housing units in the township. The racial makeup was 70.7% (12,639) White, 9.2% (1,646) Black or African American, 0.11% (19) Native American, 3.7% (658) Asian, 0.03% (5) Pacific Islander, 2.75% (492) from other races, and 7.14% (1,277) from two or more races. Hispanic or Latino of any race were 6.41% (1,146) of the population.

Of the 6,233 households, 28.8% had children under the age of 18; 50.8% were married couples living together; 13.7% had a female householder with no husband present and 30.4% were non-families. Of all households, 26.1% were made up of individuals living alone and 12.0% had someone living alone who was 65 years of age or older. The average household size was 2.64 and the average family size was 3.19.

22.4% of the population were under the age of 18, 10.2% from 18 to 24, 39.9% from 25 to 44, 27.7% from 45 to 64, and 14.1% who were 65 years of age or older. The median age was 39 years. For every 100 females, the population had 83.6 males. For every 100 females ages 18 and older there were 80.4 males.

=== 2010 census ===
The 2010 United States census counted 16,896 people, 6,148 households, and 4,636 families in the township. The population density was 2,563.4 per square mile (989.7/km^{2}). There were 6,442 housing units at an average density of 977.4 per square mile (377.4/km^{2}). The racial makeup was 81.01% (13,688) White, 9.56% (1,616) Black or African American, 0.20% (33) Native American, 4.04% (683) Asian, 0.04% (7) Pacific Islander, 2.72% (459) from other races, and 2.43% (410) from two or more races. Hispanic or Latino of any race were 4.61% (779) of the population.

Of the 6,148 households, 36.1% had children under the age of 18; 59.5% were married couples living together; 11.4% had a female householder with no husband present and 24.6% were non-families. Of all households, 19.9% were made up of individuals and 6.3% had someone living alone who was 65 years of age or older. The average household size was 2.74 and the average family size was 3.18.

25.0% of the population were under the age of 18, 7.9% from 18 to 24, 27.9% from 25 to 44, 27.3% from 45 to 64, and 11.9% who were 65 years of age or older. The median age was 38.1 years. For every 100 females, the population had 95.9 males. For every 100 females ages 18 and older there were 91.3 males.

The Census Bureau's 2006–2010 American Community Survey showed that (in 2010 inflation-adjusted dollars) median household income was $77,220 (with a margin of error of +/− $3,880) and the median family income was $90,487 (+/− $5,875). Males had a median income of $65,365 (+/− $3,756) versus $46,941 (+/− $4,681) for females. The per capita income for the borough was $34,191 (+/− $1,760). About 3.3% of families and 4.4% of the population were below the poverty line, including 5.3% of those under age 18 and 4.1% of those age 65 or over.

=== 2000 census ===
As of the 2000 United States census there were 15,536 people, 5,816 households, and 4,327 families residing in the township. The population density was 2,339.6 inhabitants per square mile (903.3/km^{2}). There were 5,936 housing units at an average density of 893.9 per square mile (345.1/km^{2}). The racial makeup of the township was 82.87% White, 9.42% African American, 0.17% Native American, 2.80% Asian, 0.16% Pacific Islander, 1.63% from other races, and 2.94% from two or more races. Hispanic or Latino of any race were 3.25% of the population.

There were 5,816 households, out of which 34.6% had children under the age of 18 living with them, 59.4% were married couples living together, 11.1% had a female householder with no husband present, and 25.6% were non-families. 21.0% of all households were made up of individuals, and 6.6% had someone living alone who was 65 years of age or older. The average household size was 2.67 and the average family size was 3.11.

In the township the population was spread out, with 24.5% under the age of 18, 7.9% from 18 to 24, 31.7% from 25 to 44, 25.1% from 45 to 64, and 10.8% who were 65 years of age or older. The median age was 37 years. For every 100 females, there were 96.9 males. For every 100 females age 18 and over, there were 95.1 males.

The median income for a household in the township was $58,526, and the median income for a family was $67,895. Males had a median income of $46,496 versus $31,024 for females. The per capita income for the township was $25,312. About 3.2% of families and 4.1% of the population were below the poverty line, including 4.8% of those under age 18 and 5.6% of those age 65 or over.

== Government ==
=== Local government ===
Delran Township is governed within the Faulkner Act (formally known as the Optional Municipal Charter Law) under the Mayor-Council system of municipal government (Plan D), implemented based on the recommendations of a Charter Study Commission as of July 1, 1972. The township is one of 71 municipalities (of the 564) statewide that use this form of government. The governing body is comprised of the Mayor and the five-member Township Council, all of whom are elected to staggered four-year terms on a partisan basis as part of the November general election in even-numbered years. The Township Council includes three members elected to represent wards and two elected at-large. Terms for the mayor and council are staggered, with the three ward seats up for vote together and the two at-large and mayoral seats expiring two years later. Beginning in 2010, elections for Mayor and Council were shifted from non-partisan to partisan.

As of 2023, the Mayor of Delran Township, New Jersey is Democrat Gary Catrambone, whose term of office ends December 31, 2024. Members of the Delran Township Council are Council President Tyler Burrell (at-large; 2024), Council Vice President Thomas A. Lyon (Ward 2; 2026), Nikki Apeadu (Ward 1; 2026), Lynn Jeney (at-large, 2024) and Marlowe Smith (Ward 3; 2026).

The township council appointed Marlowe Smith in January 2021 from the three nominees submitted by the Democratic municipal committee to fill the Ward 3 seat expiring in December 2022 that became vacant after Michael Mormando resigned the previous month. Smith served on an interim basis until the November 2021 general election when he was elected to serve the balance of the term of office.

In February 2019, the Township Council selected Thomas Lyon from a list of three candidates nominated by the Democratic municipal committee to fill the Ward 2 seat expiring in December 2022 that was vacated by Dan O'Connell when he was selected to fill a vacant seat on the Burlington County Board of Chosen Freeholders the previous month; Lyon served on an interim basis until the November 2019 general election, when he was elected to fill the remaining three years of the term of office.

==== Fire department ====
The Delran Fire Department has two volunteer fire stations in the township, Station No. 1 (founded in April 1916) and No. 2 (formed in 1928). The rescue operations are coordinated by supervisors, and carried out with equipped vehicles in the stations. The two stations originated in the early twentieth century, during the development of the township. The station has about 35 active members and an emergency response that responds to fire with more than 600 calls a year.

=== Federal, state and county representation ===
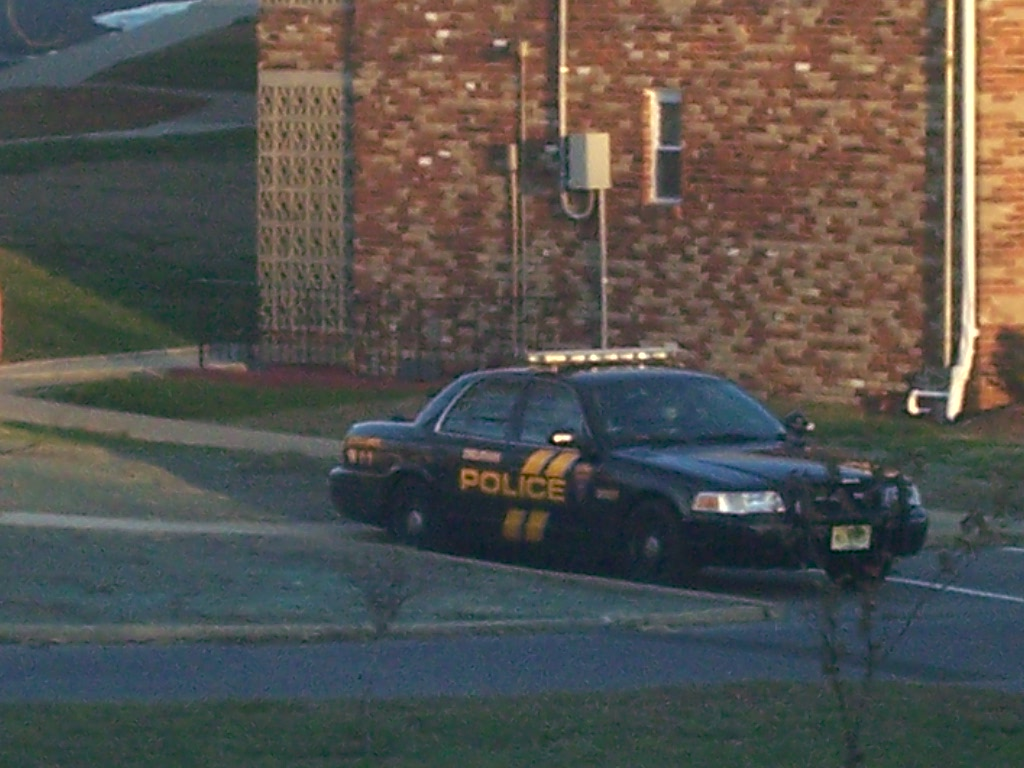
A Delran police car.

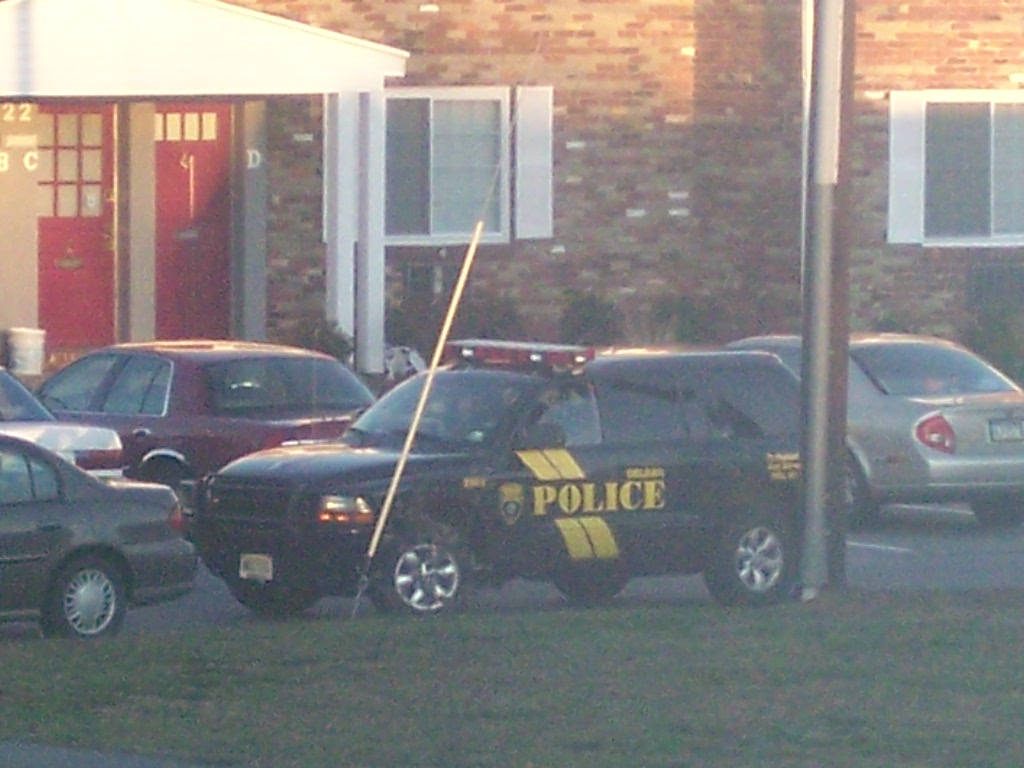
A Delran police SUV.

Delran Township is located in the 3rd Congressional District and is part of New Jersey's 7th state legislative district.

For the 119th United States Congress, New Jersey's 3rd congressional district is currently represented Herb Conaway (D, Delran Township). New Jersey is represented in the United States Senate by Democrats Cory Booker (Newark, term ends 2027) and Andy Kim (Moorestown, term ends 2031).

For the 2026–2027 session, the 7th legislative district of the New Jersey Legislature is represented in the State Senate by Troy Singleton (D, Palmyra) and in the General Assembly by Carol A. Murphy (D, Mount Laurel) and Balvir Singh (D, Burlington Township).

Burlington County is governed by a Board of County Commissioners comprised of five members who are chosen at-large in partisan elections to serve three-year terms of office on a staggered basis, with either one or two seats coming up for election each year; at an annual reorganization meeting, the board selects a director and deputy director from among its members to serve a one-year term. As of 2026, Burlington County's Commissioners are: Director Felicia Hopson (D, Willingboro Township, term as commissioner ends December 31, 2027; term as director ends 2026), Deputy Director Allison Eckel (D, Medford, term as commissioner ends 2028; term as deputy director ends 2026), Randy Brolo (D, Lumberton, 2026; elected to an unexpired term), Tyler Burrell (D, Delran Township, 2027) and Tom Pullion (D, Edgewater Park, 2026).

Burlington County's constitutional officers are Clerk Joanne Schwartz (D, Southampton Township, 2028), Sheriff James H. Kostoplis (D, Bordentown, 2028) and Surrogate Brian J. Carlin (D, Burlington Township, 2026).

=== Politics ===
United States presidential election results for Delran Township 2024 2020 2016 2012 2008 2004
Year	Republican		Democratic		Third party(ies)	
Year	No.	%	No.	%	No.	%
2024	3,716	45.10%	4,424	53.70%	99	1.20%
2020	4,259	43.71%	5,353	54.94%	132	1.35%
2016	3,579	44.03%	4,300	52.90%	250	3.08%
2012	3,410	42.08%	4,623	57.05%	70	0.86%
2008	3,452	41.64%	4,766	57.48%	73	0.88%
2004	3,639	46.76%	4,083	52.46%	61	0.78%

As of March 2011, there were a total of 10,192 registered voters in Delran Township, of which 3,551 (34.8% vs. 33.3% countywide) were registered as Democrats, 2,091 (20.5% vs. 23.9%) were registered as Republicans and 4,546 (44.6% vs. 42.8%) were registered as Unaffiliated. There were 4 voters registered as Libertarians or Greens. Among the township's 2010 Census population, 60.3% (vs. 61.7% in Burlington County) were registered to vote, including 80.4% of those ages 18 and over (vs. 80.3% countywide).

In the 2012 presidential election, Democrat Barack Obama received 4,623 votes here (56.6% vs. 58.1% countywide), ahead of Republican Mitt Romney with 3,410 votes (41.8% vs. 40.2%) and other candidates with 70 votes (0.9% vs. 1.0%), among the 8,162 ballots cast by the township's 10,687 registered voters, for a turnout of 76.4% (vs. 74.5% in Burlington County). In the 2008 presidential election, Democrat Barack Obama received 4,766 votes here (57.1% vs. 58.4% countywide), ahead of Republican John McCain with 3,452 votes (41.3% vs. 39.9%) and other candidates with 73 votes (0.9% vs. 1.0%), among the 8,351 ballots cast by the township's 10,324 registered voters, for a turnout of 80.9% (vs. 80.0% in Burlington County). In the 2004 presidential election, Democrat John Kerry received 4,083 votes here (52.2% vs. 52.9% countywide), ahead of Republican George W. Bush with 3,639 votes (46.6% vs. 46.0%) and other candidates with 61 votes (0.8% vs. 0.8%), among the 7,815 ballots cast by the township's 9,760 registered voters, for a turnout of 80.1% (vs. 78.8% in the whole county).

Gubernatorial election results for Delran Township
Year	Republican		Democratic		Third party(ies)	
Year	No.	%	No.	%	No.	%
2025	2,851	41.02%	4,061	58.43%	38	0.55%
2021	2,604	48.54%	2,734	50.96%	27	0.50%
2017	1,820	44.24%	2,225	54.08%	69	1.68%
2013	2,939	63.37%	1,634	35.23%	65	1.40%
2009	2,435	50.19%	2,171	44.74%	246	5.07%
2005	2,003	44.39%	2,357	52.24%	152	3.37%

In the 2013 gubernatorial election, Republican Chris Christie received 2,939 votes here (62.3% vs. 61.4% countywide), ahead of Democrat Barbara Buono with 1,634 votes (34.6% vs. 35.8%) and other candidates with 65 votes (1.4% vs. 1.2%), among the 4,717 ballots cast by the township's 10,593 registered voters, yielding a 44.5% turnout (vs. 44.5% in the county). In the 2009 gubernatorial election, Republican Chris Christie received 2,435 votes here (49.7% vs. 47.7% countywide), ahead of Democrat Jon Corzine with 2,171 votes (44.3% vs. 44.5%), Independent Chris Daggett with 201 votes (4.1% vs. 4.8%) and other candidates with 45 votes (0.9% vs. 1.2%), among the 4,898 ballots cast by the township's 10,422 registered voters, yielding a 47.0% turnout (vs. 44.9% in the county).

United States Senate election results for Delran Township1
Year	Republican		Democratic		Third party(ies)	
Year	No.	%	No.	%	No.	%
2024	3,215	40.23%	4,675	58.50%	101	1.26%
2018	3,059	45.65%	3,278	48.92%	364	5.43%
2012	3,089	40.47%	4,492	58.86%	51	0.67%
2006	2,124	46.09%	2,402	52.13%	82	1.78%

United States Senate election results for Delran Township2
Year	Republican		Democratic		Third party(ies)	
Year	No.	%	No.	%	No.	%
2020	4,084	42.89%	5,330	55.98%	107	1.12%
2014	1,971	45.48%	2,303	53.14%	60	1.38%
2013	1,173	48.37%	1,235	50.93%	17	0.70%
2008	3,038	40.90%	4,286	57.71%	103	1.39%

== Education ==
=== Public schools ===
The Delran Township School District serves public school students in pre-kindergarten through twelfth grade. As of the 2023–24 school year, the district, comprised of four schools, had an enrollment of 2,889 students and 261.9 classroom teachers (on an FTE basis), for a student–teacher ratio of 11.0:1. Schools in the district (with 2023–24 enrollment data from the National Center for Education Statistics) are Millbridge Elementary School with 662 students in grades PreK–2, Delran Intermediate School with 580 students in grades 3–5, Delran Middle School with 678 students in grades 6-8 and Delran High School with 931 students in grades 9-12.

Students from Delran Township, and from all of Burlington County, are eligible to attend the Burlington County Institute of Technology, a countywide public school district that serves the vocational and technical education needs of students at the high school and post-secondary level at its campuses in Medford and Westampton.

=== Private schools ===
Holy Cross Academy is an independent regional Roman Catholic high school founded in 1957 and is the only such school in Burlington County. With the start of the 2018–2019 school year, the school operates independent of the supervision and financial support of the Roman Catholic Diocese of Trenton and leases the building from the Diocese.

Montessori Academy of New Jersey is a private school located in Delran Township, and is one of only three AMI-certified Montessori method schools in New Jersey. MANJ was founded in 1965 and educates students ages 18 months through 14 years old.

== Transportation ==
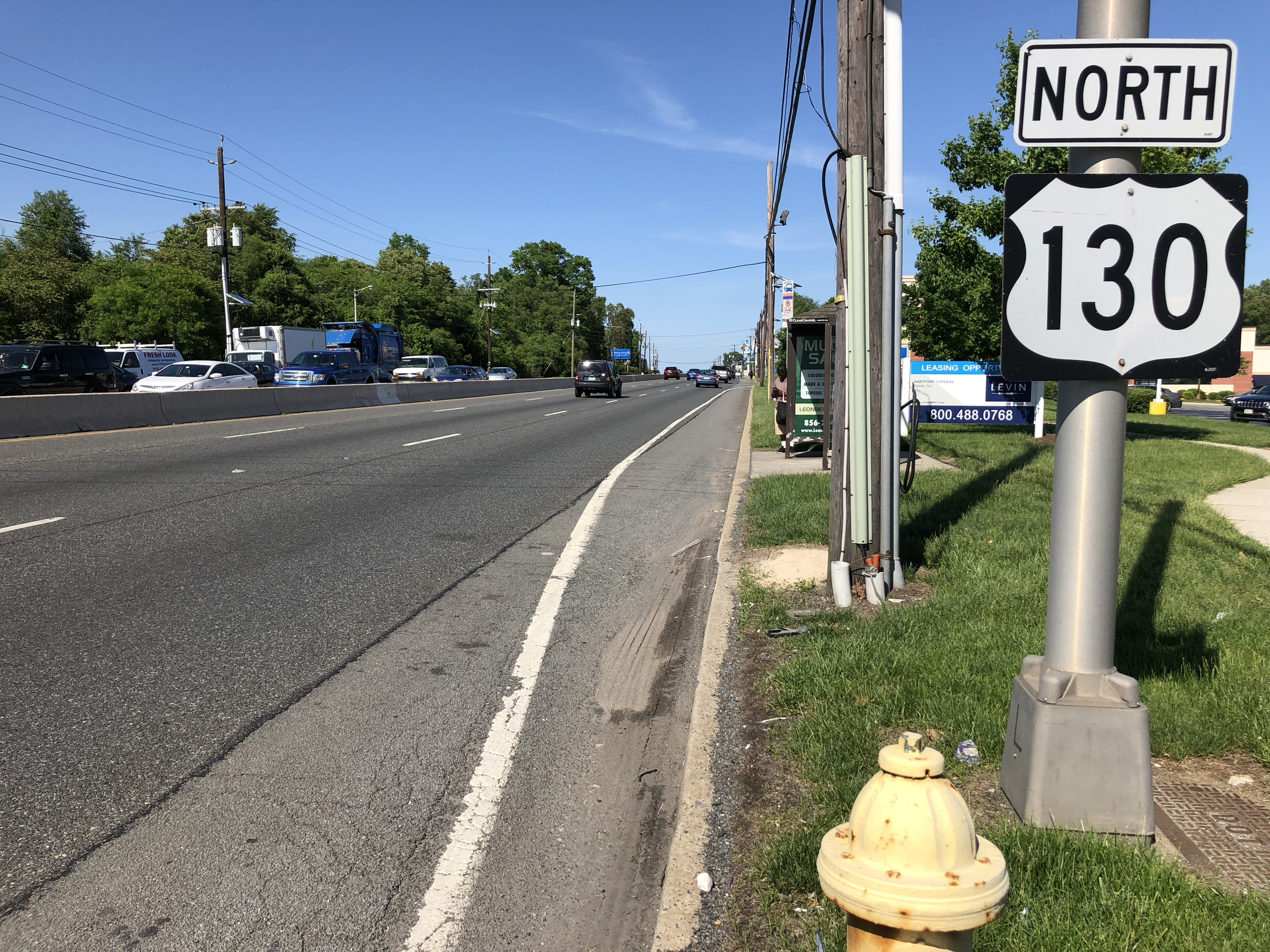
U.S. Route 130 in Delran

=== Roads and highways ===
As of May 2010, the township had a total of 61.20 miles (98.49 km) of roadways, of which 52.35 miles (84.25 km) were maintained by the municipality, 6.50 miles (10.46 km) by Burlington County and 2.35 miles (3.78 km) by the New Jersey Department of Transportation.

U.S. Route 130 is the main highway serving Delran. County Route 543 also crosses the township.

=== Public transportation ===
NJ Transit provides bus service on the 409 and 417 route between Trenton and Philadelphia, and on the 419 route between Camden and Burlington.

BurLink bus service is offered on the B8 route (between the Riverside station and Hartford crossing / Delran) and the B10 route (between Cinnaminson station and Route 130 / Union Landing Road).

Although there is no station in the township, the NJ Transit River Line passenger rail runs through Delran along St. Mihiel Drive. Nearby stations in Riverside (accessible via the BurLink B8 route) and Cinnaminson (accessible via the BurLink B10 route) offer southbound service to Camden and the Walter Rand Transportation Center (with transfers available to the PATCO Speedline) and northbound service to the Trenton Rail Station with connections to NJ Transit trains to New York City, SEPTA trains to Philadelphia, and Amtrak trains on the Northeast Corridor.

== Media ==
=== Print ===
Delran is served by a handful of daily newspapers including the Burlington County Times, The Courier-Post, The Trenton Times, The Trentonian, The Philadelphia Inquirer and the Philadelphia Daily News. Weeklies include The Delran Sun and the Newsweekly. South Jersey and Philadelphia Magazine are monthly, covering the entire metropolitan area.

=== Television ===
Delran is served by the Philadelphia market of stations of six major television networks, ABC (WPVI-TV, Ch. 6), CBS (KYW-TV, Ch. 3), NBC (WCAU, Ch. 10), PBS (WHYY-TV, Ch. 12), The CW (WPSG, Ch. 57), MyNetworkTV (WPHL-TV, Ch. 17) and Fox (WTXF-TV, Ch. 29), as well as several PBS and independent stations.

== Notable people ==
People who were born in, residents of, or otherwise closely associated with Delran Township include:

- Raphael Bostic (born 1966), economist and academic, who became the 15th President and CEO of the Federal Reserve Bank of Atlanta in June 2017
- Jake Burbage (born 1992), actor who is best known for his role on Grounded for Life
- Bill Duff (born 1974), former NFL, NFL Europe, and arena football defensive tackle who co-hosted The History Channel series Human Weapon
- Herb Conaway (born 1963), U.S. representative and former New Jersey Assemblyman
- Tricia Fabbri, women's basketball head coach at Quinnipiac University
- Donald Goerke (1926–2010), business executive and food developer, who invented SpaghettiOs while working for the Franco-American division of the Campbell's in 1965
- Mykal-Michelle Harris (born 2012), actress who has appeared on telivision in Mixed-ish
- Nate Hemsley (born 1974), former football linebacker who played in the National Football League for the Dallas Cowboys, Miami Dolphins and Carolina Panthers
- Alex Lewis (born 1981), football linebacker with the Detroit Lions
- Carli Lloyd (born 1982), Olympic champion in 2008 and 2012, FIFA World Player of the Year and world champion in 2015 and 2019 with the United States women's national soccer team
- Todd Lowber (born 1982), former football wide receiver who played for the Toronto Argonauts of the Canadian Football League
- Heather Marter, participant in 2011's Las Vegas
- Suzanne Muldowney (born 1952), performance artist known as "Underdog Lady"
- MD Myers (born 2001), soccer player who plays as a striker for Charleston Battery in the USL Championship
- Jeremy Rafanello (born 2000), soccer forward who plays for Bethlehem Steel in the United Soccer League
- John Sacca (born 1971), former quarterback in the Arena Football League who played for the Connecticut Coyotes
- Tony Sacca (born 1970), former NFL quarterback who played for the Phoenix Cardinals
- Ernest F. Schuck (1929–2009), politician who served for seven years as mayor of Barrington, New Jersey and eight years in the New Jersey General Assembly, from 1974 to 1982, where he represented the 5th Legislative District
- Peter Vermes (born 1966), Head coach and technical director of Sporting KC who was a World Cup and MLS soccer veteran
- Stephen M. Wolownik (1946–2000), pioneer in the Russian and Eastern European music community in the United States
- Peter Wright (born 1972), swimmer in the 1500m freestyle at the 1996 Summer Olympics

Preceded by Riverside Township	Bordering communities of Philadelphia	Succeeded by Cinnaminson Township
