= Mike McLaughlin (basketball) =

American basketball coach (born 1966)

Mike McLaughlin (born 1966) is the women's basketball coach for the University of Pennsylvania since 2009. For his basketball playing career, McLaughlin reached the first round of the 1989 NAIA men's basketball tournament while at Holy Family College. From 1989 to 1992, he continued to play basketball with the Washington Generals. After becoming the women's basketball coach for Holy Family in 1995, McLaughlin's team were in the Elite Eight of the NAIA Division II Women's Basketball Championship four times from 1998 to 2002.

After the NAIA school moved to the NCAA in 2003, McLaughlin and Holy Family reached the final of the Northeast Regional during the 2008 NCAA Division II women's basketball tournament. While accumulating 407 wins and 61 losses, McLaughlin was the "fastest coach in ... NCAA women's basketball to earn 400 career wins". With Penn, his team made three first round appearances at the NCAA Division I women's basketball tournament between 2014 and 2017. He has received multiple consecutive Coach of the Year awards while a part of the Central Atlantic Collegiate Conference and Ivy League. McLaughlin joined the Central Atlantic Collegiate Conference Hall of Fame in 2016.

== Early life and education ==
During 1966, McLaughlin was born in Torresdale, Philadelphia. While attending Father Judge High School in the mid-1980s, McLaughlin was scheduled to miss a month and a half of basketball after a foot injury. At the end of his high school basketball career, McLaughlin had a leg fracture. The injury limited his time on the basketball team before he finished high school. While at Holy Family College, McLaughlin played basketball as a recreational sport from 1984 to 1986. Outside of sports, he studied criminal justice and worked as a bartender.

== Men's basketball ==
Throughout the remainder of the 1980s, McLaughlin was a member of Holy Family's men's basketball team. His team reached the Keystone Athletic Conference Championship game in 1988 and 1989. During November 1988, McLaughlin was "the first Holy Family player to reach the 1,000-point mark". That year, he did not play with the team for a month after an ankle injury in December.

At the 1989 NAIA men's basketball tournament, McLaughlin reached the first round with Holy Family. With Holy Family, "[he] scored 1,710 career points and had 755 assists." During mid 1989, McLaughlin joined the Washington Generals. By March 1990, he primarily played in North America and Europe for the Generals. In 1992, McLaughlin left Washington and did not play on any other basketball teams.

== Coaching career ==
=== Holy Family ===
In 1993, McLaughlin joined Holy Family and began his women's basketball career as an assistant. He became their women's basketball coach during 1995. At the CACC women's basketball tournament, McLaughlin won the event three times from 2000 to 2002 while his Holy Family team competed in the NAIA. At the NAIA Division II Women's Basketball Championship, McLaughlin's team reached the Elite Eight in 1998 and 2001. His players also reached the Elite Eight during the NAIA Division II tournament in 2002 and 2003.

In 2003, Holy Family moved from the NAIA to join the NCAA Division II. Between 2005 and 2008, McLaughlin won three CACC women's basketball tournaments with the NCAA school. During this time period, McLaughlin was one of La Salle University's choices to become coach of their women's basketball team in 2004. In 2007, McLaughlin decided not to move to Mount St. Mary's University after the university hired him to coach their basketball team.

At the 2008 NCAA Division II women's basketball tournament, his team reached the final of the Northeast Regional. During February 2009, McLaughlin reached 400 victories in women's basketball. With his 459th game, he set the record for "fastest coach in ... NCAA women's basketball to earn 400 career wins". After leaving the team that year, McLaughlin had 407 wins and 61 losses.

=== Penn ===
In April 2009, McLaughlin went to the University of Pennsylvania to become the coach of their women's basketball team. McLaughlin and Penn won the 2017 Ivy League women's basketball tournament. At this event, his team were the runner-up in 2018 and 2019. From 2014 to 2017, McLaughlin's team reached the first round of the NCAA Division I women's basketball tournament three times.

During the 2013 Women's Basketball Invitational, McLaughlin's team reached the semi-finals. At the Women's National Invitation Tournament, McLaughlin's team reached the second round in 2015, 2018 and 2019 during the post-season event. Overall, McLaughlin had his 500th win in 2015 and 600th win in 2020 while with Penn.

== Honors and personal life ==
While at Holy Family, McLaughlin was Coach of the Year consecutively between 1995 and 2002 for the Central Atlantic Collegiate Conference. Apart from 2004, McLaughlin received additional back to back Coach of the Year awards for the CACC from 2003 to 2009. With Penn, McLaughlin was a three-time Coach of the Year for the Ivy League between 2016 and 2019.

As part of the Pennsylvania Sports Hall of Fame, McLaughlin became part of the Philadelphia City All Star Chapter in 2013. In 2016, McLaughlin joined the Central Atlantic Collegiate Conference Hall of Fame. McLaughlin additionally became part a hall of fame for Holy Family in 2019 and selected to join one for Father Judge in 2023. He has three kids during his marriage.

== See also ==
- List of college women's basketball career coaching wins leaders
