= 2016–17 Penn Quakers women's basketball team =

Intercollegiate basketball season

2016–17 Penn Quakers women's basketball

Ivy League regular season & tournament champions

NCAA women's tournament, first round
- Conference: Ivy League
- Record: 22–8 (13–1 Ivy)
- Head coach: Mike McLaughlin (8th season)
- Assistant coaches: Bernadette Laukaitis; Kelly Killion
- Home arena: Palestra

2016–17 Ivy League women's basketball standings
| | Conf. | | | | Overall |
| Team | W | | L | PCT | W | | L | PCT |
|---|---|---|---|---|---|---|---|---|
| Penn† | 13 | – | 1 | .929 | 22 | – | 7 | .759 |
| Princeton | 9 | – | 5 | .643 | 16 | – | 13 | .552 |
| Harvard | 8 | – | 6 | .571 | 21 | – | 9 | .700 |
| Cornell | 7 | – | 7 | .500 | 16 | – | 11 | .593 |
| Brown | 7 | – | 7 | .500 | 16 | – | 12 | .571 |
| Yale | 6 | – | 8 | .429 | 15 | – | 12 | .556 |
| Columbia | 3 | – | 11 | .214 | 13 | – | 14 | .481 |
| Dartmouth | 3 | – | 11 | .214 | 8 | – | 19 | .296 |
† 2017 Ivy League Tournament winner Rankings from AP Poll

The 2016–17 Penn Quakers women's basketball team represented the University of Pennsylvania during the 2016–17 NCAA Division I women's basketball season. The Quakers, led by eighth year head coach Mike McLaughlin, played their home games at the Palestra and were members of the Ivy League. The team was picked by the Ivy League in the pre-season to be conference champions. They finished the season 22–8, 13–1 to win the Ivy League regular season title and their first ever Ivy League Tournament to earn an automatic trip to the NCAA women's tournament, where they had a 21 point lead before losing to Texas A&M in the first round.

== Ivy League changes ==
This season, the Ivy League instituted conference postseason tournaments. The tournaments only awarded the Ivy League automatic bids for the NCAA Division I Men's and Women's Basketball Tournaments; the official conference championships will continue to be awarded based solely on regular-season results. The Ivy League playoff took place March 11 and 12 at the Palestra. There were two semi-final games on the first day with the No. 1 seed playing the No. 4 seed and the No. 2 seed playing the No. 3 seed. The final was played the next day for the NCAA bid.

== Roster ==
2016–17 Penn Quakers women's basketball team
Players
Coaches

| Pos. | # | Name | Height | Year | Hometown |
|---|---|---|---|---|---|
| F | 2 | Jackie Falconer | 6 ft 0 in (1.83 m) | Jr | Mechanicsburg, PA |
| G | 10 | Anna Ross | 5 ft 9 in (1.75 m) | Jr | Syracuse, NY |
| G | 12 | Kasey Chambers (C) | 5 ft 7 in (1.7 m) | Sr | Belmar, NJ |
| C | 13 | Sydney Stipanovich (C) | 6 ft 3 in (1.91 m) | Sr | St. Louis, MO |
| G | 14 | Beth Brzozowski | 5 ft 8 in (1.73 m) | Jr | Highland Heights, OH |
| G | 21 | Lauren Whitlatch | 5 ft 11 in (1.8 m) | Jr | Bloomington, IN |
| G | 22 | Deja Jackson | 5 ft 8 in (1.73 m) | So | Grinnell, IA |
| G | 23 | Kristen Daley | 6 ft 1 in (1.85 m) | So | Sharon, MA |
| G | 24 | Alexis Glasgow | 5 ft 10 in (1.78 m) | Jr | Arlington Heights, IL |
| G | 25 | Ashley Russell | 5 ft 10 in (1.78 m) | Fr | Braintree, MA |
| F | 42 | Jameira Johnson | 6 ft 1 in (1.85 m) | So | Taneytown, MD |
| F | 43 | Michelle Nwokedi | 6 ft 3 in (1.91 m) | Jr | Missouri City, TX |
| F | 50 | Princess Aghayere | 6 ft 0 in (1.83 m) | So | Reston, VA |

Head coach

- Mike McLaughlin (Holy Family)

Assistant coach(es)

- Bernadette Laukaitis (Holy Family)
- Kelly Killion (Holy Family)

Legend

- (C) Team captain
- (S) Suspended
- (I) Ineligible
- (W) Walk-on
- Injured
- Current redshirt

Roster

== Schedule ==
| Date time, TV | Rank^{#} | Opponent^{#} | Result | Record | Site (attendance) city, state |
Regular season
| Nov 13, 2016*; 2:00 p.m. | | at Duke | L 55–68 | 0–1 | Cameron Indoor Stadium (3,263); Durham, NC |
| Nov 16, 2016*; 7:00 p.m. | | Binghamton | L 48–61 | 0–2 | Palestra (378); Philadelphia, PA |
| Nov 18, 2016*; 7:00 p.m. | | at Rhode Island | W 75–43 | 1–2 | Ryan Center (329); Kingston, RI |
| Nov 22, 2016*; 7:00 p.m., ESPN3 | | Saint Joseph's | L 53–57 | 1–3 | Palestra (503); Philadelphia, PA |
| Nov 30, 2016*; 6:00 p.m. | | at Lafayette | W 64–47 | 2–3 | Kirby Sports Center (274); Easton, PA |
| Dec 3, 2016*; 1:00 p.m. | | at Wagner | W 63–39 | 3–3 | Spiro Sports Center (623); Staten Island, NY |
| Dec 7, 2016*; 5:30 p.m. | | La Salle | L 56–58 ^{OT} | 3–4 | Palestra (331); Philadelphia, PA |
| Dec 10, 2016*; 2:00 p.m. | | at Richmond | W 47–44 | 4–4 | Robins Center (623); Richmond, VA |
| Dec 31, 2016*; 7:00 p.m. | | at Cal State Northridge | W 47–36 | 5–4 | Matadome (307); Northridge, CA |
| Jan 2, 2017*; 8:00 p.m. | | at UC Riverside | W 71–55 | 6–4 | The SRC (149); Riverside, CA |
| Jan 7, 2017; 2:00 p.m., ESPN3 | | at Princeton | W 62–57 | 7–4 (1–0) | Jadwin Gymnasium (857); Princeton, NJ |
| Jan 13, 2017; 5:30 pm | | Yale | W 66–55 | 8–4 (2–0) | Palestra (462); Philadelphia, PA |
| Jan 14, 2017; 5:30 pm | | Brown | W 86–60 | 9–4 (3–0) | Palestra (427); Philadelphia, PA |
| Jan 18, 2017*; 7:00 pm | | Villanova | L 48–60 | 9–5 | Palestra (575); Philadelphia, PA |
| Jan 25, 2017*; 7:00 pm | | Temple | L 53–63 | 9–6 | Palestra (414); Philadelphia, PA |
| Jan 29, 2017*; 5:00 pm | | Stevens Tech | W 89–43 | 10–6 | Palestra (405); Philadelphia, PA |
| Feb 3, 2017; 7:00 pm, ESPN3 | | Harvard | W 63–43 | 11–6 (4–0) | Palestra (763); Philadelphia, PA |
| Feb 4, 2017; 7:00 pm | | Dartmouth | W 68–38 | 12–6 (5–0) | Palestra (727); Philadelphia, PA |
| Feb 10, 2017; 7:00 pm | | at Columbia | W 64–54 | 13–6 (6–0) | Levien Gymnasium (408); New York, NY |
| Feb 11, 2017; 5:00 p.m. | | at Cornell | W 61–55 | 14–6 (7–0) | Newman Arena (729); Ithaca, NY |
| Feb 17, 2017; 5:30 p.m., ESPN3 | | at Brown | W 71–68 | 15–6 (8–0) | Pizzitola Sports Center; Providence, RI |
| Feb 18, 2017; 6:00 pm | | at Yale | L 48–61 | 15–7 (8–1) | John J. Lee Amphitheater (1,074); New Haven, CT |
| Feb 24, 2017; 7:00 pm | | Cornell | W 47–34 | 16–7 (9–1) | Palestra (1,013); Philadelphia, PA |
| Feb 25, 2017; 7:00 pm | | Columbia | W 68–59 | 17–7 (10–1) | Palestra (967); Philadelphia, PA |
| Mar 3, 2017; 7:00 p.m. | | at Dartmouth | W 60–47 | 18–7 (11–1) | Leede Arena (546); Hanover, NH |
| Mar 4, 2016; 6:00 pm | | at Harvard | W 64–46 | 19–7 (12–1) | Lavietes Pavilion (703); Cambridge, MA |
| Mar 7, 2017; 7:00 pm | | Princeton | W 52–40 | 20–7 (13–1) | Palestra (720); Philadelphia, PA |
Ivy League Women's tournament
| March 11, 2017; 11:30 am, ESPN3 | (1) | vs. (4) Brown; Semifinals | W 71–60 | 21–7 | Palestra; Philadelphia, PA |
| March 12, 2017; 4:00 pm, ESPNU | (1) | vs. (2) Princeton; Championship Game | W 57–48 | 22–7 | Palestra; Philadelphia, PA |
NCAA women's tournament
| March 18, 2017*; 8:00 pm, ESPN | (12 B) | vs. (5 B) Texas A&M; First Round | L 61–63 | 22–8 | Pauley Pavilion; Los Angeles, CA |
*Non-conference game. ^{#}Rankings from AP Poll. (#) Tournament seedings in parentheses. B=Bridgeport Region. All times are in Eastern Time.

== Rankings ==
2016–17 NCAA Division I women's basketball rankings

Regular season ranking movement Legend: ██ Increase in ranking. ██ Decrease in ranking. ██ Not ranked the previous week. RV=Received votes.
| Poll | Pre- Season | Week 2 | Week 3 | Week 4 | Week 5 | Week 6 | Week 7 | Week 8 | Week 9 | Week 10 | Week 11 | Week 12 | Week 13 | Week 14 | Week 15 | Week 16 | Week 17 | Week 18 | Week 19 | Final |
|---|---|---|---|---|---|---|---|---|---|---|---|---|---|---|---|---|---|---|---|---|
| AP | NR | NR | NR | | | | | | | | | | | | | | | | | N/A |
| Coaches | RV | NR | NR | | | | | | | | | | | | | | | | | |

== See also ==
- 2016–17 Penn Quakers men's basketball team
