= 2016–17 Yale Bulldogs women's basketball team =

Intercollegiate basketball season

2016–17 Yale Bulldogs women's basketball
- Conference: Ivy League
- Record: 15–12 (6–8 Ivy)
- Head coach: Allison Guth (2nd season)
- Assistant coaches: Melissa D'Amico; Roman Owen; Jacinda Dunbar
- Home arena: John J. Lee Amphitheater

2016–17 Ivy League women's basketball standings
	Conf.				Overall
Team	W		L	PCT	W		L	PCT
Penn†	13	–	1	.929	22	–	7	.759
Princeton	9	–	5	.643	16	–	13	.552
Harvard	8	–	6	.571	21	–	9	.700
Cornell	7	–	7	.500	16	–	11	.593
Brown	7	–	7	.500	16	–	12	.571
Yale	6	–	8	.429	15	–	12	.556
Columbia	3	–	11	.214	13	–	14	.481
Dartmouth	3	–	11	.214	8	–	19	.296
† 2017 Ivy League Tournament winner Rankings from AP Poll

The 2016–17 Yale Bulldogs women's basketball team represented Yale University during the 2016–17 NCAA Division I women's basketball season. The Bulldogs, led by second year head coach Allison Guth, played their home games at John J. Lee Amphitheater of the Payne Whitney Gymnasium and are members of the Ivy League. They finished the season 15–12, 6–8 in Ivy League play to finish in sixth place.

== Ivy League changes ==
This season, the Ivy League will institute conference postseason tournaments. The tournaments will only award the Ivy League automatic bids for the NCAA Division I Men's and Women's Basketball Tournaments; the official conference championships will continue to be awarded based solely on regular-season results. The Ivy League playoff will take place March 11 and 12 at the Palestra in Philadelphia. There will be two semifinal games on the first day with the No. 1 seed playing the No. 4 seed and the No. 2 seed playing the No. 3 seed. The final will be played the next day for the NCAA bid.

== Roster ==
2016–17 Yale Bulldogs women's basketball team
Players
Coaches

Pos.	#	Name	Height	Year	Previous school	Hometown
G	1	Jessica Steffen	5 ft 9 in (1.75 m)	Fr	Buhler	Hutchinson, KS
G	4	Megan Gorman	6 ft 1 in (1.85 m)	Fr	Vero Beach	Vero Beach, FL
G/F	10	Gabby Nelson	6 ft 0 in (1.83 m)	So	Birdville	Hurst, TX
G	11	Paige Vermeer	5 ft 8 in (1.73 m)	So	Castilleja	Mountain View, CA
F	12	Jen Berkowitz	6 ft 2 in (1.88 m)	Jr	The Rivers School	Wayland, MA
G	14	Mary Ann Santucci	5 ft 9 in (1.75 m)	Jr	Seattle Prep	Seattle, WA
G	15	Meghan McIntyre	5 ft 10 in (1.78 m)	Sr	Oaks Christian	Santa Rosa Valley, CA
G	21	Roxy Barahman	5 ft 8 in (1.73 m)	Fr	Oaks Christian	Calabasas, CA
G	23	Tamara Simpson	5 ft 10 in (1.78 m)	Jr	Portlege	North Babylon, NY
G	24	Lena Munzer	5 ft 8 in (1.73 m)	Sr	Highland Park	Highland Park, IL
F	25	Alexandra Maund	5 ft 11 in (1.8 m)	So	Noble and Greenough	Dorchester, MA
F	33	Elizabeth Haley	6 ft 1 in (1.85 m)	Sr	Oakwood	Dayton, OH
F	40	Brownyn Davies	5 ft 11 in (1.8 m)	Fr	Wayland	Wayland, MA
C	44	Jessica Lezon	6 ft 6 in (1.98 m)	Fr	North Reading	North Reading, MA

Head coach

- Allison Guth (Illinois)

Assistant coach(es)

- Melissa D'Amico (Notre Dame)
- Roman Owen (Southwestern Christian)
- Jacinda Dunbar (Quinnipiac)

Legend

- (C) Team captain
- (S) Suspended
- (I) Ineligible
- (W) Walk-on
- Injured
- Current redshirt

Roster

== Schedule ==
Date time, TV	Rank^{#}	Opponent^{#}	Result	Record	Site (attendance) city, state
Non-conference regular season
11/13/2016*; 2:00 pm		Binghamton	W 57–48	1–0	John J. Lee Amphitheater; New Haven, CT
11/15/2016*; 7:00 pm		at Manhattan	L 57–63	1–1	Draddy Gymnasium (241); Riverdale, NY
11/18/2016*; 7:00 pm		at Army	L 55–59	1–2	Christl Arena (793); West Point, NY
11/20/2016*; 2:00 pm		Vermont	W 77–48	2–2	John J. Lee Amphitheater (241); New Haven, CT
11/22/2016*; 8:00 pm		at Illinois State	W 59–45	3–2	Redbird Arena (656); Normal, IL
11/27/2016*; 5:00 pm		at Holy Cross	W 71–70 ^{OT}	4–2	Hart Center (642); Worcester, MA
11/30/2016*; 7:00 pm		at Wagner	W 66–52	5–2	Spiro Sports Center (288); Staten Island, NY
12/01/2016*; 7:00 pm		at LIU Brooklyn	W 75–44	6–2	Steinberg Wellness Center (277); Brooklyn, NY
12/03/2016*; 2:00 pm		Albany	W 64–53 ^{OT}	7–2	John J. Lee Amphitheater (407); New Haven, CT
12/07/2016*; 7:00 pm, ESPN3		Boston College	L 64–71	7–3	John J. Lee Amphitheater (253); New Haven, CT
12/11/2016*; 1:00 pm		at New Hampshire	W 64–58	8–3	Lundholm Gym (351); Durham, NH
12/28/2016*; 5:00 pm		at No. 13 Stanford	L 44–102	8–4	Maples Pavilion (3,564); Stanford, CA
12/31/2016*; 3:00 pm		at UC Santa Barbara	W 64–60	9–4	The Thunderdome (675); Santa Barbara, CA
Ivy League regular season
01/13/2017; 8:00 pm		at Penn	L 45–66	9–5 (0–1)	Palestra (462); Philadelphia, PA
01/14/2017; 5:30 pm, OWS		at Princeton	L 62–74	9–6 (0–2)	Jadwin Gymnasium (755); Princeton, NJ
01/20/2017; 5:30 pm, ESPN3		at Brown	L 73–77	9–7 (0–3)	Pizzitola Sports Center (1,217); Providence, RI
01/27/2017; 5:30 pm		Brown	W 73–51	10–7 (1–3)	John J. Lee Amphitheater (1,007); New Haven, CT
02/03/2017; 6:00 pm		Columbia	L 68–72	10–8 (1–4)	John J. Lee Amphitheater (408); New Haven, CT
02/04/2017; 6:00 pm		Cornell	L 63–76	10–9 (1–5)	John J. Lee Amphitheater (427); New Haven, CT
02/10/2017; 7:00 pm		at Dartmouth	W 57–50	11–9 (2–5)	Leede Arena (487); Hanover, NH
02/11/2017; 6:00 pm, ESPN3		at Harvard	L 56–76	11–10 (2–6)	Lavietes Pavilion (531); Cambridge, MA
02/17/2017; 5:30 pm, ESPN3		Princeton	L 47–69	11–11 (2–7)	John J. Lee Amphitheater (721); New Haven, CT
02/18/2017; 6:00 pm		Penn	W 61–48	12–11 (3–7)	John J. Lee Amphitheater (1,074); New Haven, CT
02/24/2017; 7:00 pm, ESPN3		Harvard	W 57–52	13–11 (4–7)	John J. Lee Amphitheater (1,002); New Haven, CT
02/25/2017; 7:30 pm		Dartmouth	W 58–44	14–11 (5–7)	John J. Lee Amphitheater (1,103); New Haven, CT
03/03/2017; 6:00 pm, ESPN3		at Cornell	L 49–59	14–12 (5–8)	Newman Arena (621); Ithaca, NY
03/04/2017; 6:00 pm		at Columbia	W 55–47	15–12 (6–8)	Levien Gymnasium (579); New York City, NY
*Non-conference game. ^{#}Rankings from AP Poll. (#) Tournament seedings in parentheses. All times are in Eastern Time.

== See also ==
- 2016–17 Yale Bulldogs men's basketball team
