= Courtney Banghart =

American basketball coach (born 1978)

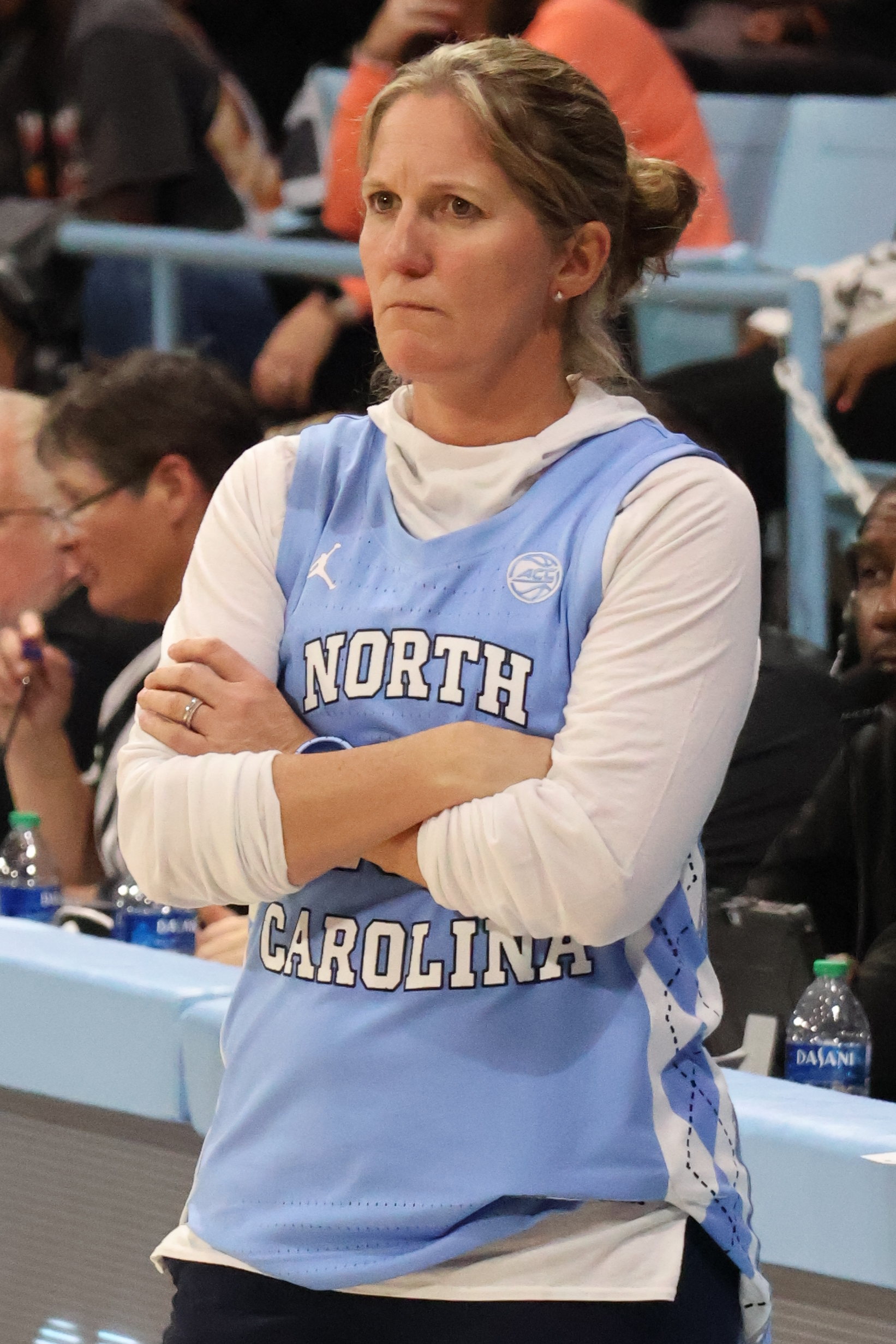
- Banghart coaching North Carolina in 2024

Current position
- Title: Head coach
- Team: North Carolina
- Conference: ACC
- Record: 153–72 (.680)

Biographical details
- Born: May 11, 1978 (age 48); Manchester, New Hampshire, U.S.

Playing career
- 1996–2000: Dartmouth
- Position: Guard

Coaching career (HC unless noted)
- 2000–2003: Episcopal HS
- 2003–2007: Dartmouth (assistant)
- 2007–2019: Princeton
- 2019–present: North Carolina

Administrative career (AD unless noted)
- 2000–2003: Episcopal HS

Head coaching record
- Overall: 407–175 (.699)
- Tournaments: 9–14 (NCAA); 1–2 (WNIT)

Accomplishments and honors

Championships
- 7× Ivy League regular season (2010–2013, 2015, 2018, 2019); 2× Ivy League tournament (2018, 2019)

Awards
- Naismith National Coach of the Year (2015); 2× Ivy League Coach of the Year (2015, 2018); NJSWA Women's College Coach of the Year (2010); 2× First-team All-Ivy (1999, 2000); Ivy All-Freshman Team (1997)

Courtney Rosholt Banghart (born May 11, 1978) is an American basketball coach who is currently the head women's basketball coach at North Carolina. Prior to North Carolina, she served as head coach at Princeton from 2007 to 2019.

== Playing career ==
Born in Manchester, New Hampshire, Banghart graduated from Souhegan High School in Amherst, New Hampshire and Dartmouth College, also in New Hampshire. As a guard, Banghart played for Dartmouth from 1996 to 2000, including the Dartmouth teams that won the 1999 and 2000 Ivy League titles. She holds Dartmouth records for three-pointers in a game, season, and career.

== Coaching career ==
From 2000 to 2003, Banghart was athletic director and head coach of the girls' basketball and girls' tennis teams at Episcopal High School in Alexandria, Virginia.

As an assistant coach at Dartmouth, Banghart helped lead Dartmouth to two Ivy League championships, and two NCAA appearances in 2005 and 2006. Dartmouth went 70–44 those seasons including 41–15 in Ivy League play.

In 2007, Banghart became the head coach for the Princeton Tigers. Her teams there won five outright Ivy League championships from 2010 through 2015, and, as a result, appeared in five NCAA Division I women's tournaments and a sixth "at-large" appearance in 2016. Her best team was the 2014–15 unit, which went 30–0 in the regular season and defeated Green Bay in the 2015 NCAA tournament—the first NCAA tournament win in program history. That same season saw Banghart notch her 164th win as Princeton head coach, vaulting her past Joan Kowalik to become the winningest coach in Princeton women's basketball history.

On February 3, 2017, against Dartmouth, her alma mater, Banghart notched her 200th win as a head coach. She tallied her 250th career win on March 2, 2019, against Harvard.

In April 2017, Banghart was selected to be an assistant coach for the 2017 USA Basketball Women's U23 national team, which is composed of women, age 23 or younger, who are currently freshmen, sophomores or juniors in college. The team competed in and won the inaugural U24 Four Nations Tournament in Tokyo, Japan.

On April 30, 2019, Banghart was announced as the new head coach at North Carolina. Her first two seasons at Carolina had their share of ups and downs; however, Banghart's early Carolina tenure picked up steam on the recruiting trail, with all four signees in Carolina's 2021 recruiting class being named to the women's Jordan Brand Classic event.

Banghart recorded her 300th win as a head coach on February 3, 2022, against Wake Forest. Her Tar Heels team won its twentieth game on February 17 in an upset over the No. 3 ranked Louisville Cardinals, becoming the first Tar Heel women's team to post twenty overall wins and ten conference wins in a season since the 2014–15 campaign. The 2021–22 Tar Heels' 13 wins in ACC conference play are the most since the 2012–13 season, when Sylvia Hatchell's team won 14 ACC games.

=== Recognition ===
In 2015, the United States Basketball Writers Association named Banghart as Coach of the Year. Fortune named her one of the World's 50 Greatest Leaders for "taking charge of a mediocre team that had never made the NCAA tournament" while ensuring players met Princeton's academic standards.

== Head coaching record ==
Record table
Season	Team	Overall	Conference	Standing	Postseason
Princeton Tigers (Ivy League) (2007–2019)
2007–08	Princeton	7–23	4–10	6th	
2008–09	Princeton	14–14	9–5	3rd	
2009–10	Princeton	26–3	14–0	1st	NCAA First Round
2010–11	Princeton	24–5	13–1	1st	NCAA First Round
2011–12	Princeton	24–5	14–0	1st	NCAA First Round
2012–13	Princeton	22–7	13–1	1st	NCAA First Round
2013–14	Princeton	21–9	11–3	T–2nd	WNIT Second Round
2014–15	Princeton	31–1	14–0	1st	NCAA Second Round
2015–16	Princeton	23–6	12–2	2nd	NCAA First Round
2016–17	Princeton	16–14	9–5	2nd	WNIT First Round
2017–18	Princeton	24–6	12–2	1st	NCAA First Round
2018–19	Princeton	22–10	12–2	1st	NCAA First Round
Princeton:		254–103 (.711)	137–31 (.815)		
North Carolina Tar Heels (Atlantic Coast Conference) (2019–present)
2019–20	North Carolina	16–14	7–11	T–11th	Postseason cancelled
2020–21	North Carolina	13–11	8–9	8th	NCAA First Round
2021–22	North Carolina	25–7	13–5	T–3rd	NCAA Sweet Sixteen
2022–23	North Carolina	22–11	11–7	T–6th	NCAA Second Round
2023–24	North Carolina	20–13	11–7	T–7th	NCAA Second Round
2024–25	North Carolina	29–8	13–5	T–4th	NCAA Sweet Sixteen
2025–26	North Carolina	28–8	14–4	3rd	NCAA Sweet Sixteen
North Carolina:		153–72 (.680)	77–48 (.616)		
Total:		407–175 (.699)			
National champion Postseason invitational champion Conference regular season champion Conference regular season and conference tournament champion Division regular season champion Division regular season and conference tournament champion Conference tournament champion
