= Central Atlantic Collegiate Conference men's basketball tournament =

- Conference basketball championship
- Sport: Basketball
- Conference: Central Atlantic Collegiate Conference
- Format: Single-elimination tournament
- Played: 2002–2003, 2005–present
- Current champion: Felician (3rd)
- Most championships: Bloomfield (6); Jefferson (6)
- Official website: CACC men's basketball

The Central Atlantic Collegiate Conference men's basketball tournament is the annual conference basketball championship tournament for the Central Atlantic Collegiate Conference. The tournament has been held annually since 2002. It is a single-elimination tournament and seeding is based on regular season records.

The winner receives the CACC's automatic bid to the NCAA Men's Division II Basketball Championship.

== Results ==
Year	Champions	Score	Runner-up
2002	Caldwell	82–49	Nyack
2003	Teikyo Post	74–70	Felician
2004	Unknown		
2005	Bloomfield	91–67	Caldwell
2006	Bloomfield	70–64	Dominican
2007	Caldwell	61–60	USciences
2008	Philadelphia	73–67 (2OT)	Holy Family
2009	Philadelphia	63–56	Bloomfield
2010	Felician	84–69	Goldey–Beacom
2011	Bloomfield	94–81	Goldey–Beacom
2012	Bloomfield	62–50	Goldey–Beacom
2013	Bloomfield	68–64	Philadelphia
2014	Philadelphia	42–41	Holy Family
2015	Philadelphia	77–68	Wilmington
2016	Holy Family	87–68	Philadelphia
2017	Bloomfield	69–56	Dominican
2018	Jefferson	59–58	Dominican
2019	Dominican	70-55	Bloomfield
2020	Dominican	75-63	Jefferson
2021	Cancelled due to the COVID-19 pandemic		
2022	Felician	65-64	Dominican
2023	Caldwell	72-69	Jefferson
2024	Jefferson	89–69	Bloomfield
2025	Bridgeport	67–57	Post
2026	Felician	91–81	Goldey–Beacom

== Championship records ==
School	Finals Record	Finals Appearances	Years
Bloomfield	6–3	9	2005, 2006, 2011, 2012, 2013, 2017
Jefferson (Philadelphia)	6–3	9	2008, 2009, 2014, 2015, 2018, 2024
Felician	3–1	4	2010, 2022, 2026
Caldwell	3–1	4	2002, 2007, 2023
Dominican	2–4	6	2019, 2020
Holy Family	1–2	3	2016
Post (Teikyo Post)	1–1	2	2003
Bridgeport	1–0	1	2025
Goldey–Beacom	0–4	4	
Alliance (Nyack)	0–1	1	
USciences	0–1	1	
Wilmington (DE)	0–1	1	

- Chestnut Hill and Georgian Court have not yet qualified for the CACC tournament finals.
- Concordia (NY) and NJIT never qualified for the CACC tournament finals as a conference member.
- Schools highlighted in pink are former members of the CACC.

== See also ==
- CACC women's basketball tournament
