= 2016–17 Princeton Tigers women's basketball team =

Intercollegiate basketball season

2016–17 Princeton Tigers women's basketball

WNIT, First Round
- Conference: Ivy League
- Record: 16–14 (9–5 Ivy)
- Head coach: Courtney Banghart (10th season)
- Assistant coaches: Milena Flores (10th season); Chessie Jackson (2nd season); Carrie Moore (1st season)
- Home arena: Jadwin Gymnasium

2016–17 Ivy League women's basketball standings
	Conf.				Overall
Team	W		L	PCT	W		L	PCT
Penn†	13	–	1	.929	22	–	7	.759
Princeton	9	–	5	.643	16	–	13	.552
Harvard	8	–	6	.571	21	–	9	.700
Cornell	7	–	7	.500	16	–	11	.593
Brown	7	–	7	.500	16	–	12	.571
Yale	6	–	8	.429	15	–	12	.556
Columbia	3	–	11	.214	13	–	14	.481
Dartmouth	3	–	11	.214	8	–	19	.296
† 2017 Ivy League Tournament winner Rankings from AP Poll

The 2016–17 Princeton Tigers women's basketball team represented Princeton University during the 2016–17 NCAA Division I women's basketball season. The Tigers, led by tenth-year head coach Courtney Banghart, played their home games at Jadwin Gymnasium as members of the Ivy League. The team was picked by the Ivy League in the pre-season to finish second in the conference. The team finished the season with a 16–14 overall, 9–5 Ivy record, and appeared in the Women's National Invitation Tournament, where they lost to Villanova in the first round.

== Previous season ==
The Tigers finished the 2015–16 season with a 23–6 overall record and 12–2 in the Ivy League. Their only two conference losses came against Pennsylvania, who won the season-ending championship game. The Tigers were an at-large selection to the NCAA tournament, notably becoming the first-ever Ivy League team to earn an at-large bid in either the men's or women's NCAA Tournament. However, they lost in the first round to West Virginia.

== Ivy League changes ==
This season, the Ivy League instituted conference postseason tournaments. The tournaments only awarded the Ivy League automatic bids for the NCAA Division I Men's and Women's Basketball Tournaments; the official conference championships continue to be awarded based solely on regular-season results. The Ivy League playoff took place on March 11 and 12 at the Palestra in Philadelphia. There were two semifinal games on the first day, with No. 1 seed Penn playing No. 4 seed Cornell and No. 2 seed Princeton playing No. 3 seed Harvard. The final, ultimately between Penn and Princeton, was played the next day for the NCAA bid.

== Roster ==
2016–17 Princeton Tigers women's basketball team
Players
Coaches

Pos.	#	Name	Height	Year	Hometown
G/F	31	Bella Alarie	6 ft 4 in (1.93 m)	Fr	Bethesda, MD
F	22	Taylor Baur	6 ft 2 in (1.88 m)	Fr	St. Louis, MO
G	2	Taylor Brown (C)	5 ft 8 in (1.73 m)	Sr	Woodstock, GA
G/F	5	Caroline Davis	6 ft 0 in (1.83 m)	So	Newark, DE
G	24	Kenya Holland	5 ft 8 in (1.73 m)	Jr	Stafford, VA
G	23	Qalea Ismail (injured)	6 ft 1 in (1.85 m)	So	Bel Air, MD
G/F	20	Sydney Jordan	6 ft 0 in (1.83 m)	So	Manassas, VA
F/C	11	Sara Lewis	6 ft 3 in (1.91 m)	Fr	San Antonio, TX
G	0	Claudia Muhammad	5 ft 8 in (1.73 m)	So	Charlotte, NC
G	10	Jordan Reid	5 ft 7 in (1.7 m)	So	DeWitt, MI
F	44	Jackie Reyneke	6 ft 4 in (1.93 m)	Sr	Saddle River, NJ
F	45	Leslie Robinson	6 ft 0 in (1.83 m)	Jr	Corvallis, OR
G	25	Gabrielle Rush	5 ft 10 in (1.78 m)	So	Hinsdale, IL
G	13	Vanessa Smith (C)	6 ft 1 in (1.85 m)	Sr	Twinsburg, OH
F	33	Jordan Stallworth	6 ft 0 in (1.83 m)	Fr	Buford, GA
G	32	Tia Weledji	5 ft 10 in (1.78 m)	Jr	Overland Park, KS

Head coach

- Courtney Banghart (Dartmouth)

Assistant coach(es)

- Milena Flores (Stanford)
- Chessie Jackson (Williams)
- Carrie Moore (Western Michigan)

Legend

- (C) Team captain
- (S) Suspended
- (I) Ineligible
- (W) Walk-on
- Injured
- Current redshirt

Roster
Last update: October 30, 2016

2016-17 Ivy awards and recognition
- Bella Alarie – Rookie of the Year; First Team All-Ivy
- Leslie Robinson – Second Team All-Ivy

== Schedule ==
Date time, TV	Rank^{#}	Opponent^{#}	Result	Record	Site (attendance) city, state
Regular season
Nov 11, 2016*; 7:00 pm		Rider	L 62–70	0–1	Jadwin Gymnasium (785); Princeton, NJ
Nov 13, 2016*; Noon		at George Washington	L 45–56	0–2	Charles E. Smith Center (1,003); Washington, D.C.
Nov 19, 2016*; Noon		Dayton	L 56–62 ^{OT}	0–3	Jadwin Gymnasium (518); Princeton, NJ
Nov 22, 2016*; 7:00 pm		at Delaware	L 62–66	0–4	Bob Carpenter Center (1,005); Newark, DE
Nov 25, 2016*; 2:00 pm, ESPN3		Rutgers; Rivalry	W 64–34	1–4	Jadwin Gymnasium (848); Princeton, NJ
Nov 27, 2016*; 1:00 pm		at UMBC	W 69–58	2–4	Retriever Activities Center (356); Baltimore, MD
Nov 30, 2016*; 6:00 pm		Seton Hall	W 94–67	3–4	Jadwin Gymnasium (656); Princeton, NJ
Dec 7, 2016*; 6:00 pm		Lafayette	W 69–27	4–4	Jadwin Gymnasium (641); Princeton, NJ
Dec 10, 2016*; 2:00 pm		at Fordham	L 54–55	4–5	Rose Hill Gymnasium (806); Bronx, NY
Dec 18, 2016*; 2:00 pm, ESPN3		at Kansas State	L 42–60	4–6	Bramlage Coliseum (4,193); Manhattan, KS
Dec 21, 2016*; 6:00 pm		Wagner	W 107–44	5–6	Jadwin Gymnasium (489); Princeton, NJ
Dec 29, 2016*; 7:00 pm		at Georgia Tech	L 51–67	5–7	Hank McCamish Pavilion (856); Atlanta, GA
Dec 31, 2016*; 1:00 pm		at Lipscomb	W 71–43	6–7	Allen Arena (253); Nashville, TN
Ivy League regular season
Jan 7, 2017; 2:00 pm, ESPN3		Penn	L 57–62	6–8 (0–1)	Jadwin Gymnasium (857); Princeton, NJ
Jan 13, 2017; 5:30 pm		Brown	L 88–98	6–9 (0–2)	Jadwin Gymnasium (690); Princeton, NJ
Jan 14, 2017; 5:30 pm, OWS		Yale	W 74–62	7–9 (1–2)	Jadwin Gymnasium (755); Princeton, NJ
Feb 3, 2017; 7:00 pm		Dartmouth	W 85–55	8–9 (2–2)	Jadwin Gymnasium (906); Princeton, NJ
Feb 4, 2017; 6:00 pm		Harvard	W 63–58 ^{OT}	9–9 (3–2)	Jadwin Gymnasium (2,110); Princeton, NJ
Feb 10, 2017; 7:00 pm		at Cornell	W 58–54	10–9 (4–2)	Newman Arena (659); Ithaca, NY
Feb 11, 2017; 6:00 pm		at Columbia	W 62–52	11–9 (5–2)	Levien Gymnasium (562); New York City, NY
Feb 17, 2017; 5:30 pm, ESPN3		at Yale	W 69–47	12–9 (6–2)	John J. Lee Amphitheater (721); New Haven, CT
Feb 18, 2017; 3:30 pm		at Brown	W 81–75	13–9 (7–2)	Pizzitola Sports Center (1,498); Providence, RI
Feb 24, 2017; 7:00 pm		Columbia	W 78–54	14–9 (8–2)	Jadwin Gymnasium (827); Princeton, NJ
Feb 25, 2017; 6:00 pm		Cornell	L 44–55	14–10 (8–3)	Jadwin Gymnasium (1,245); Princeton, NJ
Mar 3, 2017; 7:00 pm, ESPN3		at Harvard	W 64–60	15–10 (9–3)	Lavietes Pavilion (819); Cambridge, MS
Mar 4, 2017; 6:00 pm, ESPN3		at Dartmouth	L 56–58	15–11 (9–4)	Leede Arena (768); Hanover, NH
Mar 7, 2017; 7:00 pm		at Penn	L 40–52	15–12 (9–5)	Palestra (720); Philadelphia, PA
Ivy League Tournament
Mar 11, 2017; 6:30 pm, ESPN3	(2)	vs. (3) Harvard; Semifinals	W 68–47	16–12	Palestra (6,209); Philadelphia, PA
Mar 12, 2017; 4:00 pm, ESPNU	(2)	vs. (1) Penn; Championship Game	L 48–57	16–13	Palestra (3,833); Philadelphia, PA
Women's National Invitation tournament
Mar 17, 2017*; 6:00 pm		Villanova; First Round	L 53–59	16–14	Jadwin Gymnasium; Princeton, NJ
*Non-conference game. ^{#}Rankings from AP Poll. (#) Tournament seedings in parentheses. All times are in Eastern Time.
