= CACC women's basketball tournament =

Central Atlantic Collegiate Conference women's basketball tournament
- Conference basketball championship
- Sport: Basketball
- Conference: Central Atlantic Collegiate Conference
- Format: Single-elimination tournament
- Played: 2002–present
- Current champion: Felician (1st)
- Most championships: Holy Family (8)
- Official website: CACC women's basketball

The Central Atlantic Collegiate Conference women's basketball tournament is the annual conference women's basketball championship tournament for the Central Atlantic Collegiate Conference. The tournament has been held annually since 2002. It is a single-elimination tournament and seeding is based on regular season records.

The winner receives the CACC's automatic bid to the NCAA Division II women's basketball tournament.

Holy Family have won the most tournament titles, with eight.

== Results ==
| Year | Champions | Score | Runner-up | Site |
|---|---|---|---|---|
| 2002 | Holy Family | 71–40 | Caldwell | Pike Creek Valley, DE |
| 2003 | Caldwell | 80–55 | Bloomfield | Caldwell, NJ |
| 2004 | Record not available | | | |
| 2005 | Holy Family (2) | 65–59 | USciences | Caldwell, NJ |
| 2006 | USciences | 66–57 | Caldwell | Philadelphia, PA |
| 2007 | Holy Family (3) | 68–44 | Philadelphia | Orangeburg, NY |
| 2008 | Holy Family (4) | 68–52 | Dominican | Philadelphia, PA |
| 2009 | Philadelphia | 72–63 | Wilmington (DE) | Philadelphia, PA |
| 2010 | Nyack | 45–43 | Holy Family | Caldwell, NJ |
| 2011 | Goldey–Beacom | 66–54 | Holy Family | Philadelphia, PA |
| 2012 | Holy Family (5) | 71–46 | USciences | Caldwell, NJ |
| 2013 | Holy Family (6) | 66–56 | Caldwell | Philadelphia, PA |
| 2014 | Bloomfield | 52–41 | Caldwell | Caldwell, NJ |
| 2015 | Holy Family (7) | 79–75 | Philadelphia | Philadelphia, PA |
| 2016 | Philadelphia (2) | 52–46 | Bloomfield | Orangeburg, NY |
| 2017 | USciences (2) | 72–51 | Caldwell | Caldwell, NJ |
| 2018 | USciences (3) | 64–56 | Jefferson | Philadelphia, PA |
| 2019 | Jefferson (3) | 74–73 | USciences | Caldwell, NJ |
| 2020 | Jefferson (4) | 63–59 | Holy Family | Philadelphia, PA |
| 2021 | Dominican | 81–65 | Georgian Court | Lakewood Township, NJ |
| 2022 | USciences | 53–44 | Jefferson | Caldwell, NJ |
| 2023 | Dominican (2) | 63–54 | Post | Philadelphia, PA |
| 2024 | Jefferson | 61–39 | Chestnut Hill | Caldwell, NJ |
| 2025 | Holy Family (8) | 77–68 | Jefferson | Philadelphia, PA |
| 2026 | Felician | 65–63 | Holy Family | Caldwell, NJ |

== Championship records ==
| School | Finals Record | Finals Appearances | Years |
|---|---|---|---|
| Holy Family | 8–4 | 12 | 2002, 2005, 2007, 2008, 2012, 2013, 2015, 2025 |
| Jefferson (Philadelphia) | 5–5 | 10 | 2009, 2016, 2019, 2020, 2024 |
| USciences | 4–3 | 7 | 2006, 2017, 2018, 2022 |
| Dominican | 2–1 | 3 | 2021, 2023 |
| Caldwell | 1–5 | 6 | 2003 |
| Bloomfield | 1–2 | 3 | 2014 |
| Felician | 1–0 | 1 | 2026 |
| Goldey–Beacom | 1–0 | 1 | 2011 |
| Alliance (Nyack) | 1–0 | 1 | 2010 |
| Chestnut Hill | 0–1 | 1 | |
| Post (Teikyo Post) | 0–1 | 1 | |
| Georgian Court | 0–1 | 1 | |
| Wilmington (DE) | 0–1 | 1 | |

- Bridgeport and have not yet reached a CACC tournament final.
- Concordia (NY) and NJIT never advanced to the CACC tournament finals as a conference members.
- Schools highlighted in pink are former members of the CACC.

== See also ==
- CACC men's basketball tournament
