= 2016–17 Brown Bears women's basketball team =

Intercollegiate basketball season

2016–17 Brown Bears women's basketball

Ocean State Tip-Off Champions

WBI, Quarterfinals
- Conference: Ivy League
- Record: 17–13 (7–7 Ivy)
- Head coach: Sarah Behn (3rd season)
- Assistant coaches: Tyler Patch; Sara Binkhorst; Danielle Pearson
- Home arena: Pizzitola Sports Center

2016–17 Ivy League women's basketball standings
	Conf.				Overall
Team	W		L	PCT	W		L	PCT
Penn†	13	–	1	.929	22	–	7	.759
Princeton	9	–	5	.643	16	–	13	.552
Harvard	8	–	6	.571	21	–	9	.700
Cornell	7	–	7	.500	16	–	11	.593
Brown	7	–	7	.500	16	–	12	.571
Yale	6	–	8	.429	15	–	12	.556
Columbia	3	–	11	.214	13	–	14	.481
Dartmouth	3	–	11	.214	8	–	19	.296
† 2017 Ivy League Tournament winner Rankings from AP Poll

The 2016–17 Brown Bears women's basketball team represented Brown University during the 2016–17 NCAA Division I women's basketball season. The Bears, led by third year head coach Sarah Behn, played their home games at the Pizzitola Sports Center and were members of the Ivy League. They finished the season 17–13, 7–7 in Ivy League play to finish in a tie for fourth place. They lost in the semifinals of the Ivy women's tournament to Penn. They were invited to the Women's Basketball Invitational, where they defeated UMBC in the first round before losing in the quarterfinals to UNC Greensboro.

== Ivy League changes ==
This season, the Ivy League will institute conference postseason tournaments. The tournaments will only award the Ivy League automatic bids for the NCAA Division I Men's and Women's Basketball Tournaments; the official conference championships will continue to be awarded based solely on regular-season results. The Ivy League playoff will take place March 11 and 12 at the Palestra in Philadelphia. There will be two semifinal games on the first day with the No. 1 seed playing the No. 4 seed and the No. 2 seed playing the No. 3 seed. The final will be played the next day for the NCAA bid.

== Roster ==
2016–17 Brown Bears women's basketball team
Players
Coaches

Pos.	#	Name	Height	Year	Previous school	Hometown
G	1	Megan Reilly	5 ft 7 in (1.7 m)	Jr	The Lawrenceville School	Norwood, NJ
G	2	Abby O'Keefe	5 ft 8 in (1.73 m)	Fr	Worcester Academy	St. Louis, MO
G/F	4	Justine Gaziano	6 ft 0 in (1.83 m)	Fr	Natick	Natick, MA
G	10	Taylor Will	5 ft 11 in (1.8 m)	So	Prespect	Arlington Heights, IL
G	12	Rebecca Musgrove	5 ft 9 in (1.75 m)	Sr	St. Anthony's	Plainview, NY
G	22	Randi Richardson	5 ft 5 in (1.65 m)	Fr	Carman-Ainsworth	Flint, MI
F	23	Melissa Heath	6 ft 2 in (1.88 m)	So	Northern Highlands Regional	Ho-Ho-Kus, NJ
F	24	Mary Butler	6 ft 2 in (1.88 m)	So	Bangor	Bangor, ME
G/F	25	Kathleen Ryan	6 ft 2 in (1.88 m)	Fr	Buffalo Academy of the Sacred Heart	Clarence Center, ME
G	30	Shayna Mehta	5 ft 7 in (1.7 m)	So	International	San Francisco, CA
F	31	Erika Steeves	6 ft 2 in (1.88 m)	So	Phillips Exeter Academy	Montreal, QE
G	33	Abby O'Keefe	5 ft 8 in (1.73 m)	Fr	Worcester Academy	St. Louis, MO
F/C	34	Haley Green	6 ft 3 in (1.91 m)	Fr	Glenvar	Salem, VA
F/C	55	Lames ElGammal	6 ft 2 in (1.88 m)	Fr	Baldwin	Baldwin, NY

Head coach

- Sarah Behn (Boston College)

Assistant coach(es)

- Tyler Patch (Rhode Island College)
- Sara Binkhorst (Bowdoin)
- Danielle Pearson (Providence)

Legend

- (C) Team captain
- (S) Suspended
- (I) Ineligible
- (W) Walk-on
- Injured
- Current redshirt

Roster

== Schedule ==
Date time, TV	Rank^{#}	Opponent^{#}	Result	Record	Site (attendance) city, state
Non-conference regular season
11/11/2016*; 6:00 pm		Howard	W 83–78	1–0	Pizzitola Sports Center (411); Providence, RI
11/14/2016*; 7:00 pm		at Sacred Heart	W 80–66	2–0	William H. Pitt Center (363); Fairfield, CT
11/17/2016*; 7:00 pm		at Bryant; Ocean State Cup	L 67–70	2–1	Chace Athletic Center (562); Smithfield, RI
11/20/2016*; 12:00 pm		Colgate	L 62–67	2–2	Pizzitola Sports Center (297); Providence, RI
11/22/2016*; 4:00 pm		Manhattan	L 57–58	2–3	Pizzitola Sports Center (245); Providence, RI
11/27/2016*; 1:00 pm		at Binghamton	W 83–72	3–3	Binghamton University Events Center (1,407); Vestal, NY
12/03/2016*; 3:00 pm		Rhode Island; Ocean State Tip-Off Tournament/Ocean State Cup	W 76–65	4–3	Pizzitola Sports Center (485); Providence, RI
12/04/2016*; 1:00 pm		Providence; Ocean State Tip-Off Tournament championship	W 77–70	5–3	Pizzitola Sports Center (431); Providence, RI
12/08/2016*; 11:30 am		at Vermont	W 62–50	6–3	Patrick Gym (1,206); Burlington, VT
12/22/2016*; 1:00 pm		Saint Peter's	W 80–71	7–3	Pizzitola Sports Center (650); Providence, RI
12/29/2016*; 1:00 pm		at VCU	L 72–85	7–4	Siegel Center (704); Richmond, VA
12/31/2016*; 1:00 pm		at Morgan State	W 68–51	8–4	Talmadge L. Hill Field House (121); Baltimore, MD
01/09/2017*; 12:00 pm		Rhode Island College	W 90–44	9–4	Pizzitola Sports Center (1,567); Providence, RI
Ivy League regular season
01/13/2017; 5:30 pm		at Princeton	W 98–88	10–4 (1–0)	Jadwin Gymnasium (690); Princeton, NJ
01/14/2017; 8:00 pm		at Penn	L 60–86	10–5 (1–1)	Palestra (427); Philadelphia, PA
01/20/2017; 5:30 pm, ESPN3		Yale	W 76–73	11–5 (2–1)	Pizzitola Sports Center (1,217); Providence, RI
01/28/2017; 5:30 pm		at Yale	L 51–73	11–6 (2–2)	John J. Lee Amphitheater (1,007); New Haven, CT
02/03/2017; 6:00 pm		Cornell	W 72–67	12–6 (3–2)	Pizzitola Sports Center (232); Providence, RI
02/04/2017; 4:00 pm		Columbia	W 69–60	13–6 (4–2)	Pizzitola Sports Center (274); Providence, RI
02/10/2017; 7:00 pm, ESPN3		at Harvard	L 59–69	13–7 (4–3)	Lavietes Pavilion (1,721); Cambridge, MA
02/11/2017; 6:00 pm		at Dartmouth	W 65–62	14–7 (5–3)	Leede Arena (181); Hanover, NH
02/17/2017; 5:30 pm, ESPN3		Penn	L 68–71	14–8 (5–4)	Pizzitola Sports Center; Providence, RI
02/18/2017; 3:30 pm, 2		Princeton	L 75–81	14–9 (5–5)	Pizzitola Sports Center (1,498); Providence, RI
02/24/2017; 6:00 pm, ESPN3		Dartmouth	L 88–92 ^{OT}	14–10 (5–6)	Pizzitola Sports Center (243); Providence, RI
02/25/2017; 4:00 pm		Harvard	L 63–66	14–11 (5–7)	Pizzitola Sports Center (521); Providence, RI
03/03/2017; 7:00 pm, ESPN3		at Columbia	W 76–59	15–11 (6–7)	Levien Gymnasium (459); New York City, NY
03/04/2017; 5:00 pm		at Cornell	W 67–46	16–11 (7–7)	Newman Arena (1,625); Ithaca, NY
Ivy League Women's tournament
03/11/2017; 11:00 am, ESPN3	(4)	vs. (1) Penn; Semifinals	L 60–71	16–12	Palestra; Philadelphia, PA
WBI
03/16/2017*; 7:00 pm		at UMBC; First Round	W 81–75	17–12	Retriever Activities Center (250); Catonsville, MD
03/19/2017*; 2:00 pm		at UNC Greensboro; Quarterfinals	L 84–87	17–13	Fleming Gymnasium (387); Greensboro, NC
*Non-conference game. ^{#}Rankings from AP Poll. (#) Tournament seedings in parentheses. All times are in Eastern Time.

== See also ==
- 2016–17 Brown Bears men's basketball team
