= 2016–17 Columbia Lions women's basketball team =

Intercollegiate basketball season

2016–17 Columbia Lions women's basketball
- Conference: Ivy League
- Record: 13–14 (3–11 Ivy)
- Head coach: Megan Griffith (1st season)
- Assistant coaches: Tyler Cordell; Will Ingersoll
- Home arena: Levien Gymnasium

2016–17 Ivy League women's basketball standings
	Conf.				Overall
Team	W		L	PCT	W		L	PCT
Penn†	13	–	1	.929	22	–	7	.759
Princeton	9	–	5	.643	16	–	13	.552
Harvard	8	–	6	.571	21	–	9	.700
Cornell	7	–	7	.500	16	–	11	.593
Brown	7	–	7	.500	16	–	12	.571
Yale	6	–	8	.429	15	–	12	.556
Columbia	3	–	11	.214	13	–	14	.481
Dartmouth	3	–	11	.214	8	–	19	.296
† 2017 Ivy League Tournament winner Rankings from AP Poll

The 2016–17 Columbia Lions women's basketball team represented Columbia University during the 2016–17 NCAA Division I women's basketball season. The Lions, led by first-year head coach Megan Griffith, played their home games at Levien Gymnasium and were members of the Ivy League. They finished the season 13–14, 3–11 in Ivy League play to finish in a tie for seventh place. They failed to qualify for the Ivy women's tournament, new this year.

== Ivy League changes ==
This season, the Ivy League will institute conference postseason tournaments. The tournaments will only award the Ivy League automatic bids for the NCAA Division I Men's and Women's Basketball Tournaments; the official conference championships will continue to be awarded based solely on regular-season results. The Ivy League playoff will take place March 11 and 12 at the Palestra in Philadelphia. There will be two semifinal games on the first day with the No. 1 seed playing the No. 4 seed and the No. 2 seed playing the No. 3 seed. The final will be played the next day for the NCAA bid.

== Roster ==
2016–17 Columbia Lions women's basketball team
Players
Coaches

Pos.	#	Name	Height	Year	Previous school	Hometown
G	1	Alexa Giuliano	5 ft 8 in (1.73 m)	Jr	Morris Catholic	Hackettstown, NJ
F	3	Josie Little	6 ft 2 in (1.88 m)	So	St. Ignatius College Prep	San Francisco, CA
G	4	Paige Tippet	5 ft 8 in (1.73 m)	Jr	Clear Springs	League City, TX
G/F	11	Sarah Elston	6 ft 3 in (1.91 m)	So	Loyola Academy	Bannockburn, IL
G	12	Ara Talkov	6 ft 0 in (1.83 m)	So	Swampscott	Swampscott, MA
F/C	13	Devon Roeper	6 ft 3 in (1.91 m)	Sr	The Bishop's School	San Diego, CA
G	14	Paulina Köerner	5 ft 9 in (1.75 m)	So	Apostelgymnasium	Cologne, Germany
G/F	20	Camille Zimmerman	6 ft 1 in (1.85 m)	Jr	Tempe Preparatory Academy	Tempe, AZ
F	21	Carolyn Gallagher	5 ft 10 in (1.78 m)	Sr	Archbishop Molloy	New York City, NY
G	22	Maya Sampleton	5 ft 9 in (1.75 m)	Fr	St. Stephen's Episcopal	Austin, TX
G	23	Janiya Clemmons	5 ft 9 in (1.75 m)	Fr	Bishop Denis J. O'Connell	Accokeek, MD
G/F	24	Emily Surloff	5 ft 9 in (1.75 m)	So	Windward School	Los Angeles, CA
G/F	25	Stephanie Flynn	5 ft 10 in (1.78 m)	Fr	Hanover	Hanover, MA
F	32	Tori Oliver	6 ft 0 in (1.83 m)	Sr	St. John's College	Manassas, VA
G/F	33	Abby Lee	5 ft 11 in (1.8 m)	So	West Monroe	West Monroe, LA
C	42	Jillian Borreson	6 ft 3 in (1.91 m)	Jr	Jack C. Hays	Mountain City, TX

Head coach

- Megan Griffith (Columbia)

Assistant coach(es)

- Tyler Cordell (Ohio Wesleyan)
- Will Ingersoll (William & Mary)

Legend

- (C) Team captain
- (S) Suspended
- (I) Ineligible
- (W) Walk-on
- Injured
- Current redshirt

Roster

2016-17 Ivy Awards and Recognition
- Camille Zimmerman – First Team All-Ivy

== Schedule ==
Date time, TV	Rank^{#}	Opponent^{#}	Result	Record	Site (attendance) city, state
Non-conference regular season
November 11, 2016*; 2:00 pm		UMBC	L 56–67	0–1	Levien Gymnasium (326); New York City, NY
November 13, 2016*; 2:00 pm		at Richmond	W 65–58	1–1	Robins Center (654); Richmond, VA
November 19, 2016*; 4:00 pm		at Saint Francis (PA)	W 84–77	2–1	DeGol Arena (505); Loretto, PA
November 22, 2016*; 7:00 pm		at Stony Brook	L 53–55	2–2	Island Federal Credit Union Arena (501); Stony Brook, NY
November 27, 2016*; 2:00 pm		Colgate	W 75–67	3–2	Levien Gymnasium (478); New York City, NY
November 30, 2016*; 7:00 pm		at Loyola (MD)	W 65–53	4–2	Reitz Arena (137); Baltimore, MD
December 2, 2016*; 11:00 am		UMass Lowell	W 76–57	5–2	Levien Gymnasium (2,271); New York City, NY
December 7, 2016*; 7:00 pm		Providence	W 66–64 ^{OT}	6–2	Levien Gymnasium (286); New York City, NY
December 10, 2016*; 12:00 pm		at Binghamton	W 75–65	7–2	Binghamton University Events Center; Vestal, NY
December 12, 2016*; 7:00 pm		LIU Brooklyn	W 66–57	8–2	Levien Gymnasium (319); New York City, NY
December 29, 2016*; 10:00 pm		at Cal State Fullerton	W 61–46	9–2	Titan Gym (212); Fullerton, CA
December 31, 2016*; 4:00 pm		at Long Beach State	L 60–73	9–3	Walter Pyramid (641); Long Beach, CA
January 4, 2017*; 11:30 am, ESPN3		at NJIT	W 65–51	10–3	Fleisher Center (996); Newark, NJ
Ivy League regular season
January 14, 2017; 1:00 pm, ESPN3		at Cornell	L 70–77	10–4 (0–1)	Newman Arena; Ithaca, NY
December 21, 2017; 4:30 pm, ESPN3		Cornell	L 55–69	10–5 (0–2)	Levien Gymnasium (875); New York City, NY
January 27, 2017; 7:00 pm		at Dartmouth	W 91–88 ^{4OT}	11–5 (1–2)	Leede Arena (529); Hanover, NH
January 28, 2017; 6:00 pm		at Harvard	L 68–70	11–6 (1–3)	Lavietes Pavilion (704); Cambridge, MA
February 3, 2017; 4:00 pm		at Yale	W 72–68	12–6 (2–3)	John J. Lee Amphitheater (408); New Haven, CT
February 4, 2017; 7:00 pm		at Brown	L 60–69	12–7 (2–4)	Pizzitola Sports Center (274); Providence, RI
February 10, 2017; 7:00 pm		Penn	L 54–64	12–8 (2–5)	Levien Gymnasium (408); New York City, NY
February 11, 2017; 6:00 pm		Princeton	L 52–62	12–9 (2–6)	Levien Gymnasium (562); New York City, NY
February 17, 2017; 7:00 pm		Harvard	L 55–58	12–10 (2–7)	Levien Gymnasium (477); New York City, NY
February 18, 2017; 6:00 pm		Dartmouth	W 69–48	13–10 (3–7)	Levien Gymnasium (532); New York City, NY
February 24, 2017; 7:00 pm		at Princeton	L 54–78	13–11 (3–8)	Jadwin Gymnasium (827); Princeton, NJ
February 25, 2017; 7:00 pm		at Penn	L 59–68	13–12 (3–9)	The Palestra (967); Philadelphia, PA
March 3, 2017; 7:00 pm, ESPN3		Brown	L 59–76	13–13 (3–10)	Levien Gymnasium (459); New York City, NY
March 4, 2017; 6:00 pm		Yale	L 47–55	13–14 (3–11)	Levien Gymnasium (579); New York City, NY
*Non-conference game. ^{#}Rankings from AP Poll. (#) Tournament seedings in parentheses. All times are in Eastern Time.

== See also ==
- 2016–17 Columbia Lions men's basketball team
