= 2016–17 Harvard Crimson women's basketball team =

Intercollegiate basketball season

2016–17 Harvard Crimson women's basketball

Fordham Holiday Classic Champions

WNIT, Second Round
- Conference: Ivy League
- Record: 21–9 (8–6 Ivy)
- Head coach: Kathy Delaney-Smith (35th season)
- Assistant coaches: Mike Roux; Amanda Leahy; Jasmine Sborov
- Home arena: Lavietes Pavilion

2016–17 Ivy League women's basketball standings
	Conf.				Overall
Team	W		L	PCT	W		L	PCT
Penn†	13	–	1	.929	22	–	7	.759
Princeton	9	–	5	.643	16	–	13	.552
Harvard	8	–	6	.571	21	–	9	.700
Cornell	7	–	7	.500	16	–	11	.593
Brown	7	–	7	.500	16	–	12	.571
Yale	6	–	8	.429	15	–	12	.556
Columbia	3	–	11	.214	13	–	14	.481
Dartmouth	3	–	11	.214	8	–	19	.296
† 2017 Ivy League Tournament winner Rankings from AP Poll

The 2016–17 Harvard Crimson women's basketball team represented Harvard University during the 2016–17 NCAA Division I women's basketball season. The Crimson, led by the head coach Kathy Delaney-Smith who was head coach for thirty five years, play their home games at the Lavietes Pavilion and were members of the Ivy League. They finished the season 21–9, 8–6 in Ivy League play to finish in third place. They had lost in the semifinal of the Ivy women's tournament to Princeton. They were invited to the WNIT where they defeated New Hampshire in the first round by scoring more points than they got, before losing to St. John's in the second round by getting less points than they got.

== Ivy League changes ==
This season, the Ivy League will institute conference postseason tournaments. The tournaments will only award the Ivy League automatic bids for the NCAA Division I Men's and Women's Basketball Tournaments; the official conference championships will continue to be awarded based solely on regular-season results. The Ivy League playoff will take place March 11 and 12 at the Palestra in Philadelphia. There will be two semifinal games on the first day with the No. 1 seed playing the No. 4 seed and the No. 2 seed playing the No. 3 seed. The final will be played the next day for the NCAA bid.

== Roster ==
2016–17 Harvard Crimson women's basketball team
Players
Coaches

Pos.	#	Name	Height	Year	Hometown
G	00	Nani Redford	5 ft 5 in (1.65 m)	So	Manhasset, New York
G	01	Kelsey Bogdan	5 ft 11 in (1.8 m)	So	Clarendon Hills, Illinois
G	3	Katie Benzan	5 ft 6 in (1.68 m)	Fr	Wellesley, Massachusetts
F	10	Destiny Nunley (C)	6 ft 1 in (1.85 m)	Sr	North Richland Hills, Texas
G	11	Kirby Porter	6 ft 1 in (1.85 m)	Jr	Chevy Chase, Maryland
F	13	Jeannie Boehm	6 ft 3 in (1.91 m)	Fr	Winnetka, Illinois
G	14	Mackenzie Barta	5 ft 9 in (1.75 m)	Fr	Maple Grove, Minnesota
F	15	Maria Guramare	6 ft 2 in (1.88 m)	Fr	Bédarrides, France
G	20	Madeline Raster	5 ft 9 in (1.75 m)	So	South Bend, Indiana
G	21	Taylor Finley (C)	6 ft 1 in (1.85 m)	Sr	Edina, Minnesota
G	25	Sydney Skinner	5 ft 7 in (1.7 m)	So	Plano, Texas
G	31	Taylor Rooks	6 ft 0 in (1.83 m)	Jr	Warren, New Jersey
G	33	Grace Keane	5 ft 10 in (1.78 m)	Sr	Leawood, Kansas
F	41	Hayley Isenberg	6 ft 2 in (1.88 m)	So	Dallas, Texas

Head coach

- Kathy Delaney-Smith (Bridgewater State)

Assistant coach(es)

- Mike Roux (Assumption (MA))
- Amanda Leahy (Bowdoin)
- Jasmine Sborov (Colorado)

Legend

- (C) Team captain
- (S) Suspended
- (I) Ineligible
- (W) Walk-on
- Injured
- Current redshirt

Roster
Last update: October 13, 2016

== Schedule ==
Date time, TV	Rank^{#}	Opponent^{#}	Result	Record	Site (attendance) city, state
Regular season
Nov 12, 2016*; 3:00 pm		at Minnesota	L 87–103	0–1	Williams Arena (3,056); Minneapolis, MN
Nov 15, 2016*; 6:00 pm		Maine	W 69–62	1–1	Lavietes Pavilion (413); Boston, MA
Nov 18, 2016*; 7:00 pm		Samford	W 57–52	2–1	Lavietes Pavilion (343); Boston, MA
Nov 22, 2016*; 7:00 pm		at Boston University	W 65–52	3–1	Case Gym (262); Boston, MA
Nov 26, 2016*; 6:00 pm		Fairfield	W 58–44	4–1	Lavietes Pavilion (531); Boston, MA
Nov 29, 2016*; 7:00 pm		at Sacred Heart	W 68–60	5–1	William H. Pitt Center (208); Fairfield, CT
Dec 1, 2016*; 7:00 pm		Temple	W 73–62	6–1	Lavietes Pavilion (437); Boston, MA
Dec 4, 2016*; Noon		NJIT	W 59–38	7–1	Lavietes Pavilion (507); Boston, MA
Dec 7, 2016*; 8:00 pm, ESPN3		at Kansas	W 69–59	8–1	Allen Fieldhouse (1,679); Lawrence, KS
Dec 21, 2016*; 1:00 pm		at Siena	W 65–58	9–1	Alumni Recreation Center (1,155); Loudonville, NY
Dec 29, 2016*; 2:30 pm		vs. UNC Asheville; Fordham Holiday Classic semifinals	W 79–62	10–1	Rose Hill Gymnasium (921); Bronx, NY
Dec 30, 2016*; 2:30 pm		vs. Buffalo; Fordham Holiday Classic championship	W 74–62	11–1	Rose Hill Gymnasium; Bronx, NY
Jan 7, 2017; 7:00 pm		Dartmouth	W 70–65	12–1 (1–0)	Lavietes Pavilion (572); Boston, MA
Jan 11, 2017*; 7:00 pm		at La Salle	W 66–64	13–1	Tom Gola Arena (284); Philadelphia, PA
Jan 21, 2017; 6:00 pm, ESPN3		at Dartmouth	W 70–61	14–1 (2–0)	Leede Arena (877); Hanover, NH
Jan 27, 2017; 7:00 pm, ESPN3		Cornell	W 62–59	15–1 (3–0)	Lavietes Pavilion (653); Boston, MA
Jan 28, 2017; 6:00 pm		Columbia	W 70–68	16–1 (4–0)	Lavietes Pavilion (704); Boston, MA
Feb 3, 2017; 7:00 pm, ESPN3		at Penn	L 43–63	16–2 (4–1)	Palestra (763); Philadelphia, PA
Feb 4, 2017; 6:00 pm		at Princeton	L 58–63 ^{OT}	16–3 (4–2)	Jadwin Gymnasium (2,110); Princeton, NJ
Feb 10, 2017; 7:00 pm		Brown	W 69–59	17–3 (5–2)	Lavietes Pavilion (1,721); Boston, MA
Feb 11, 2017; 6:00 pm		Yale	W 76–56	18–3 (6–2)	Lavietes Pavilion (531); Boston, MA
Feb 17, 2017; 7:00 pm		at Columbia	W 58–55	19–3 (7–2)	Levien Gymnasium (477); New York, NY
Feb 18, 2017; 5:00 pm		at Cornell	L 52–57	19–4 (7–3)	Newman Arena (559); Ithaca, NY
Feb 24, 2017; 7:00 pm		at Yale	L 52–57	19–5 (7–4)	John J. Lee Amphitheater (1,002); New Haven, CT
Feb 25, 2017; 4:00 pm		at Brown	W 66–63	20–5 (8–4)	Pizzitola Sports Center (521); Providence, RI
Mar 3, 2017; 7:00 pm		Princeton	L 60–64	20–6 (8–5)	Lavietes Pavilion (819); Boston, MA
Mar 4, 2017; 6:00 pm		Penn	L 46–64	20–7 (8–6)	Lavietes Pavilion (703); Boston, MA
Ivy League tournament
Mar 11, 2017; 6:30 pm, ESPN3	(3)	vs. (2) Princeton; Semifinals	L 47–68	20–8	Palestra (6,209); Philadelphia, PA
Women's National Invitation tournament
Mar 17, 2017*; 7:00 pm		at New Hampshire; First Round	W 69–56	21–8	Lundholm Gym (387); Durham, NH
Mar 19, 2017*; 2:00 pm		at St. John's; Second Round	L 57–62	21–9	Carnesecca Arena (535); Queens, NY
*Non-conference game. ^{#}Rankings from AP Poll. (#) Tournament seedings in parentheses. All times are in Eastern Time.

== Rankings ==
2016–17 NCAA Division I women's basketball rankings

+ Regular season polls	Poll	Pre- Season	Week 2	Week 3	Week 4	Week 5	Week 6	Week 7	Week 8	Week 9	Week 10	Week 11	Week 12	Week 13	Week 14	Week 15	Week 16	Week 17	Week 18	Week 19	Final
AP												RV								N/A	
Coaches																					

Legend
	Increase in ranking
	Decrease in ranking
	Not ranked previous week
(RV)	Received Votes

== See also ==
- 2016–17 Harvard Crimson men's basketball team
