= Allison Guth =

American basketball coach

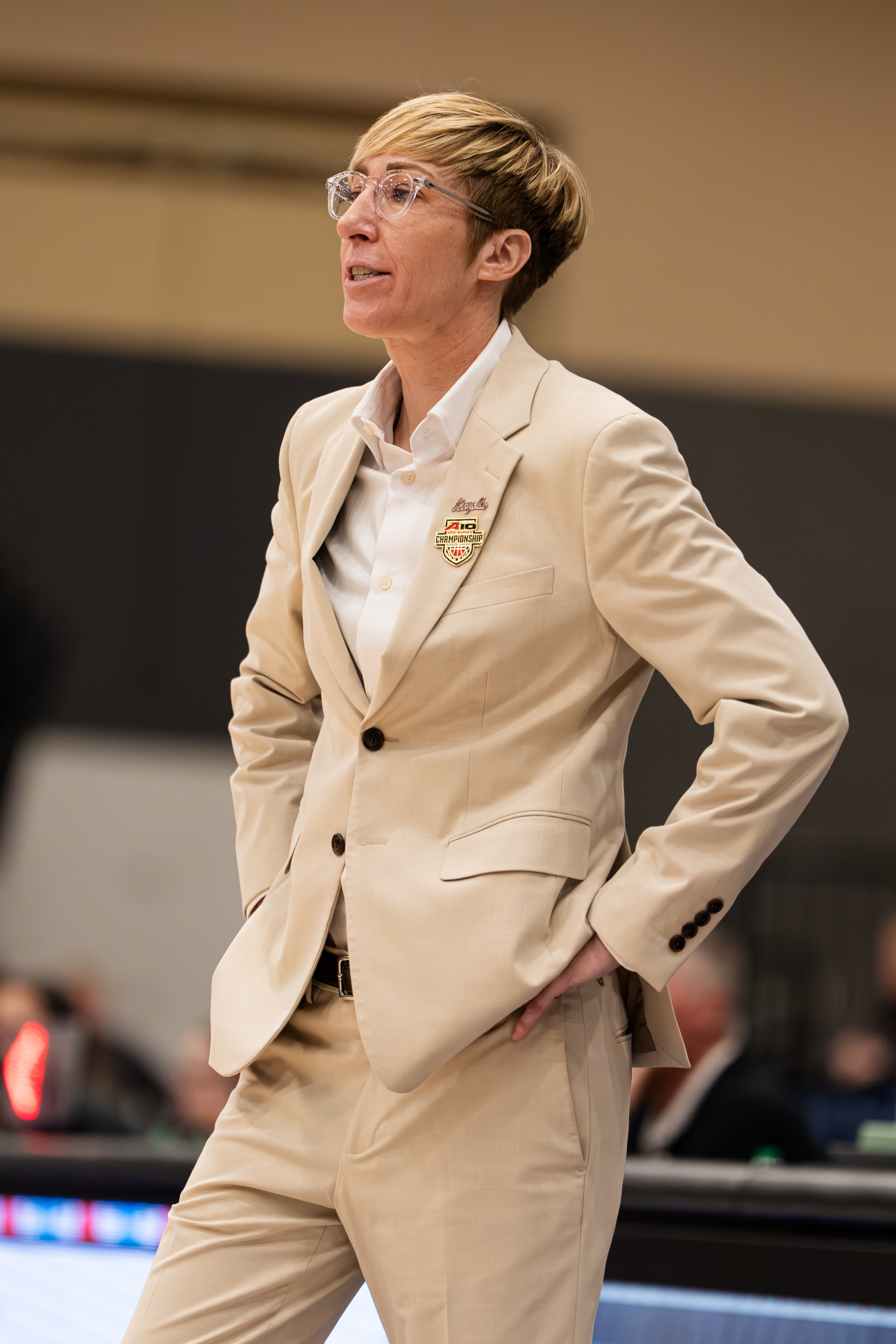
- Guth during the 2026 A10 Championship Tournament at the Henrico Sports & Events Center

Personal information
- Born: 1982 (age 43–44)

Career history

Coaching
- 2005–2007: Loyola Chicago (assistant)
- 2007–2008: Missouri (assistant)
- 2008–2010: DePaul (assistant)
- 2010–2012: Yale (assistant)
- 2013–2015: Northwestern (assistant)
- 2015–2022: Yale
- 2022–2026: Loyola Chicago
- 2026-present: Northwestern (chief of staff)

Allison Guth (born 1982) was recently the head coach of the Loyola Ramblers women's basketball team, a position she held from 2022 until 2026. She now serves as Northwestern Wildcats women's basketball's chief of staff.

Guth and Buffalo Grove High School won their first girls basketball title in 2000 as part of the Illinois High School Association. As a member of the Illinois Fighting Illini women's basketball team, Guth played in the first round of the 2003 Big Ten women's basketball tournament. After joining Coca-Cola in 2004, Guth worked as an assistant coach between 2004 and 2015. Some of these university included the University of Missouri and Northwestern University.

As the coach of the Yale Bulldogs women's basketball from 2015 to 2022, They became "the first Ivy League women's team to win a national postseason tournament" at the 2018 Women's Basketball Invitational. Upon leaving Yale, Guth had 99 wins and 74 losses. During her time at Loyola, the team reached the Super 16 during the 2026 Women's National Invitation Tournament. Guth had 50 wins and 75 losses before she left that year.

== Early life and education ==
Guth was born in the early 1980s and is from Arlington Heights, Illinois. She grew up with two siblings and played on her dad's basketball teams. After becoming an elementary school basketball player, Guth was on the basketball and golf teams at Buffalo Grove High School.

For her post-secondary education, Guth studied business marketing at the University of Illinois. While there, Guth joined the golf team in 2000.

== Career ==
While at Buffalo Grove, Guth and her team won the 1999 Schaumburg regional golf event. Guth and Buffalo Grove won the Class AA division in girls basketball the following year. With their 2000 win, it was the first time Buffalo Grove won an Illinois High School Association title in girls basketball. Outside of sports, she was on the student council while at Buffalo Grove.

While playing basketball, Guth became a redshirt after a knee injury. Guth joined the Illinois Fighting Illini women's basketball team in 2001.

By January 2002, she played at Russian basketball games for Illinois. Guth was also ill with mononucleosis. The following year, her team played in the first round of the Big Ten women's basketball tournament. She remained with the Illinois basketball team until 2004. Guth also went to DePaul University and studied educational leadership.

Guth was hired in April 2026 as Northwestern's Chief of Staff, under women's new head coach Carla Berube.

=== Sales and assistant coaching ===
After moving to Denver in 2004, she was a Coca-Cola employee in sales until the following year. As an assistant coach from 2005 to 2008, Guth spent three years with the Loyola University Chicago and one year with the University of Missouri. While at Loyola, Guth was also a recruiting coordinator. In 2008, Guth became the Director of Basketball Operations for DePaul University. She remained at DePaul before leaving for Yale University in 2010 to resume her recruiter and assistant coach experience. Guth held these two positions for Northwestern University from 2012 to 2015.

=== Head coaching ===
In 2015, Guth became the coach of the Yale Bulldogs women's basketball team. While with Yale, they reached the semifinals of the Ivy League women's basketball tournament during 2018 and 2022. Guth's roster became "the first Ivy League women's team to win a national postseason tournament" at the 2018 Women's Basketball Invitational.

After leaving Yale in 2022, she had 99 wins and 74 losses. That year, Guth became the Loyola Ramblers women's basketball coach. Her team entered the 2026 Women's National Invitation Tournament. Loyola reached the Super 16 at the event. After 50 wins and 75 losses, Guth left Loyola that year.

== Head coaching record ==
Record table
Season	Team	Overall	Conference	Standing	Postseason
Yale Bulldogs (Ivy League) (2015–2022)
2015–16	Yale	14–17	5–9	6th	
2016–17	Yale	15–12	6–8	6th	
2017–18	Yale	19–13	8–6	4th	WBI Champions
2018–19	Yale	16–13	6–8	T–4th	
2019–20	Yale	19–8	9–5	3rd	
2021–22	Yale	16–11	9–5	3rd	
Yale:		99–74 (.572)	43–41 (.512)		
Loyola Chicago Ramblers (Atlantic 10 Conference) (2022–2026)
2022–23	Loyola Chicago	6–24	1–15	15th	
2023–24	Loyola Chicago	15–16	8–10	T–8th	
2024–25	Loyola Chicago	13–17	5–13	T–12th	
2025–26	Loyola Chicago	16–18	9–9	T–12th	WNIT Super 16
Loyola:		49–75 (.395)	23–47 (.329)		
Total:		148–149 (.498)			
National champion Postseason invitational champion Conference regular season champion Conference regular season and conference tournament champion Division regular season champion Division regular season and conference tournament champion Conference tournament champion

== Honors and personal life ==
In 2013, Guth was a member of the 1999-2000 Buffalo Grove High School Girls’ Team that joined the Illinois Coaches Basketball Association Hall of Fame. She has two children.
