= 2016–17 Cornell Big Red women's basketball team =

Intercollegiate basketball season

2016–17 Cornell Big Red women's basketball
- Conference: Ivy League
- Record: 16–11 (7–7 Ivy)
- Head coach: Dayna Smith (15th season)
- Assistant coaches: Val Klopfer; Brendan Burke; Bobby Savino
- Home arena: Newman Arena

2016–17 Ivy League women's basketball standings
	Conf.				Overall
Team	W		L	PCT	W		L	PCT
Penn†	13	–	1	.929	22	–	7	.759
Princeton	9	–	5	.643	16	–	13	.552
Harvard	8	–	6	.571	21	–	9	.700
Cornell	7	–	7	.500	16	–	11	.593
Brown	7	–	7	.500	16	–	12	.571
Yale	6	–	8	.429	15	–	12	.556
Columbia	3	–	11	.214	13	–	14	.481
Dartmouth	3	–	11	.214	8	–	19	.296
† 2017 Ivy League Tournament winner Rankings from AP Poll

The 2016–17 Cornell Big Red women's basketball team represented Cornell University during the 2016–17 NCAA Division I women's basketball season. The Big Red, led by fifteenth year head coach Dayna Smith, played their home games at Newman Arena and were members of the Ivy League. They finished the season 16–11, 7–7 in Ivy League play to finish in a tie for fourth place.

== Ivy League changes ==
This season, the Ivy League will institute conference postseason tournaments. The tournaments will only award the Ivy League automatic bids for the NCAA Division I Men's and Women's Basketball Tournaments; the official conference championships will continue to be awarded based solely on regular-season results. The Ivy League playoff will take place March 11 and 12 at the Palestra in Philadelphia. There will be two semifinal games on the first day with the No. 1 seed playing the No. 4 seed and the No. 2 seed playing the No. 3 seed. The final will be played the next day for the NCAA bid.

== Roster ==
2016–17 Cornell Big Red women's basketball team
Players
Coaches

Pos.	#	Name	Height	Year	Hometown
G	03	Taylor DePalma	5 ft 6 in (1.68 m)	Sr	Ithaca, NY
G	04	Danielle Jorgenson	5 ft 9 in (1.75 m)	Fr	Orono, MN
G	05	Dylan Higgins	5 ft 11 in (1.8 m)	Fr	Bala Cynwyd, PA
G	10	Janée Dennis	6 ft 0 in (1.83 m)	Jr	Burlington Township, NJ
G	12	Samantha Widmann	5 ft 11 in (1.8 m)	Fr	Lawrenceville, NJ
G	13	Caroline Shelquist	5 ft 10 in (1.78 m)	So	Minnetonka, MN
G	22	Kerri Moran	5 ft 8 in (1.73 m)	Sr	Far Hills, NJ
G	23	Samantha Clement	5 ft 9 in (1.75 m)	So	Anaheim, CA
F	23	Nia Marshall	6 ft 0 in (1.83 m)	Sr	Macedonia, OH
F	25	Jessica Willerson	6 ft 3 in (1.91 m)	Fr	Falmouth, ME
F	30	Reena Olsen	6 ft 3 in (1.91 m)	Fr	Cortlandt Manor, NY
F	32	Nicholle Aston	6 ft 2 in (1.88 m)	Sr	Woodland Hills, CA
F	33	Christine Ehland	6 ft 1 in (1.85 m)	Jr	Pittsburgh, PA
G	34	Marie Hatch	5 ft 10 in (1.78 m)	Fr	Bethesda, MD
F	35	Maddy Reed	5 ft 10 in (1.78 m)	Fr	Arlington, VA
G	44	Megan LeDuc	5 ft 6 in (1.68 m)	Sr	Vienna, VA
F	45	Stephanie Umeh	6 ft 1 in (1.85 m)	Fr	Los Angeles, CA

Head coach

- Dayna Smith (Rhode Island)

Assistant coach(es)

- Val Klopfer (Wake Forest)
- Brendan Burke (Endicott)
- Bobby Savino (Ithaca)

Legend

- (C) Team captain
- (S) Suspended
- (I) Ineligible
- (W) Walk-on
- Injured
- Current redshirt

Roster

== Schedule ==
Date time, TV	Rank^{#}	Opponent^{#}	Result	Record	Site (attendance) city, state
Non-conference regular season
11/11/2016*; 7:00 pm		New Hampshire	W 63–56	1–0	Newman Arena (312); Ithaca, NY
11/13/2016*; 1:00 pm		Loyola (MD)	W 58–50	2–0	Newman Arena (365); Ithaca, NY
11/16/2016*; 7:00 pm		at Colgate	W 70–57	3–0	Cotterell Court (618); Hamilton, NY
11/19/2016*; 12:00 pm		at Towson	L 63–68	3–1	SECU Arena (263); Towson, MD
11/22/2016*; 7:00 pm		Howard	W 67–55	4–1	Newman Arena (310); Ithaca, NY
11/26/2016*; 6:00 pm, ACCN Extra		at Pittsburgh	L 44–56	4–2	Peterson Events Center (717); Pittsburgh, PA
11/28/2016*; 7:00 pm		at Saint Francis (PA)	W 78–72	5–2	DeGol Arena (406); Loretto, PA
12/03/2016*; 1:00 pm		Drexel	L 53–63	5–3	Newman Arena (319); Ithaca, NY
12/17/2016*; 1:00 pm		at Youngstown State	W 80–75	6–3	Beeghly Center (1,140); Youngstown, OH
12/22/2016*; 5:00 pm		Canisius	W 60–43	7–3	Newman Arena (412); Ithaca, NY
12/30/2016*; 1:00 pm		at Stony Brook	L 65–66 ^{2OT}	7–4	Island Federal Credit Union Arena (522); Stony Brook, NY
01/01/2017*; 2:00 pm		at Binghamton	W 54–51	8–4	Binghamton University Events Center (1,339); Vestal, NY
01/05/2017*; 6:00 pm		at Delaware State	W 72–51	9–4	Memorial Hall (257); Dover, NY
Ivy League regular season
01/14/2017; 1:00 pm, ESPN3		Columbia	W 77–70	10–4 (1–0)	Newman Arena; Ithaca, NY
01/21/2017; 4:30 pm, ESPN3		at Columbia	W 69–55	11–4 (2–0)	Levien Gymnasium (875); New York City, NY
01/27/2017; 7:00 pm, ESPN3		at Harvard	L 59–62	11–5 (2–1)	Lavietes Pavilion (653); Cambridge, MA
01/28/2017; 6:00 pm, ESPN3		at Dartmouth	L 74–84	11–6 (2–2)	Leede Arena (1,117); Hanover, NH
02/03/2017; 6:00 pm		at Brown	L 67–72	11–7 (2–3)	Pizzitola Sports Center (232); Providence, RI
02/04/2017; 6:00 pm		at Yale	W 76–63	12–7 (3–3)	John J. Lee Amphitheater (427); New Haven, CT
02/10/2017; 6:00 pm		Princeton	L 54–58	12–8 (3–4)	Newman Arena (659); Ithaca, NY
02/11/2017; 5:00 pm		Penn	L 55–61	12–9 (3–5)	Newman Arena (729); Ithaca, NY
02/17/2017; 6:00 pm, ESPN3		Dartmouth	W 72–57	13–9 (4–5)	Newman Arena (467); Ithaca, NY
02/18/2017; 5:00 pm		Harvard	W 57–52	14–9 (5–5)	Newman Arena (559); Ithaca, NY
02/24/2017; 7:00 pm		at Penn	L 34–47	14–10 (5–6)	Palestra (1,013); Philadelphia, PA
02/25/2017; 6:00 pm		at Princeton	W 55–44	15–10 (6–6)	Jadwin Gymnasium (1,245); Princeton, NJ
03/03/2017; 6:00 pm, ESPN3		Yale	W 59–49	16–10 (7–6)	Newman Arena (621); Ithaca, NY
03/04/2017; 5:00 pm		Brown	L 46–67	16–11 (7–7)	Newman Arena (1,625); Ithaca, NY
*Non-conference game. ^{#}Rankings from AP Poll. (#) Tournament seedings in parentheses. All times are in Eastern Time.

== See also ==
- 2016–17 Cornell Big Red men's basketball team
