= Yale Bulldogs women's basketball =

Women's college basketball team

Yale Bulldogs
2025–26 Yale Bulldogs women's basketball team
- University: Yale University
- First season: 1973; 53 years ago
- Head coach: Dalila Eshe (4th season)
- Location: New Haven, Connecticut
- Arena: Payne Whitney Gymnasium (capacity: 2,532)
- Conference: Ivy League
- Nickname: Bulldogs; Elis
- Colors: Yale blue and white
- All-time record: 491–611 (.446)

Conference regular-season champions
- 1979

Uniforms
Home	Away

The Yale Bulldogs women's basketball team is the intercollegiate women's basketball program representing Yale University. The school competes in the Ivy League in Division I of the National Collegiate Athletic Association. The Bulldogs, also nicknamed the Elis, play home basketball games at the Payne Whitney Gymnasium in New Haven, Connecticut on the university campus.

== Postseason history ==
The Bulldogs have never played in the NCAA Tournament. Yale won the Ivy League title in 1979, but the Ivy League champion at the time were not regularly invited to the NCAA Tournament. They have made two postseason appearances, the 2011 WNIT and the 2018 WBI.

=== WNIT results ===
Year	Round	Opponent	Result
2011 WNIT	First Round	Boston College	L 61–85

=== WBI results ===
Year	Round	Opponent	Result
2018 WBI	First Round; Quarterfinals; Semifinals; Championship	Northeastern; Binghamton; South Alabama; Central Arkansas	W 68–58; W 70–64; W 69–68; W 54–50

== Coaches ==
Coaching Records
Name	Years	Wins	Losses	Winning %
Chris Simmons	1973–74	1	12	.077
Mike Baskauskas	1974–75	12	6	.667
Ed Goldstone	1975–76	13	5	.722
Louise O'Neal	1976–79	40	25	.615
Maggie Muldoon	1979–84	54	71	.432
Diann Nestal	1984–90	79	78	.503
Cecelia DeMarco	1990–99	107	127	.457
Amy Backus	1999–2005	54	108	.333
Chris Gobrecht	2005–15	117	162	.419
Allison Guth	2015–22	48	32	.600
Dalila Eshe	2022–present			–
