= 2017 Ivy League women's basketball tournament =

- Classification: Division I
- Season: 2016–17
- Teams: 4
- Site: Palestra; Philadelphia, Pennsylvania
- Champions: Penn (1st title)
- Winning coach: Mike McLaughlin (1st title)
- MVP: Michelle Nwokedi (Penn)
- Attendance: 10,042
- Television: ESPNU, ESPN3

2016–17 Ivy League women's basketball standings
	Conf.				Overall
Team	W		L	PCT	W		L	PCT
Penn†	13	–	1	.929	22	–	7	.759
Princeton	9	–	5	.643	16	–	13	.552
Harvard	8	–	6	.571	21	–	9	.700
Cornell	7	–	7	.500	16	–	11	.593
Brown	7	–	7	.500	16	–	12	.571
Yale	6	–	8	.429	15	–	12	.556
Columbia	3	–	11	.214	13	–	14	.481
Dartmouth	3	–	11	.214	8	–	19	.296
† 2017 Ivy League Tournament winner Rankings from AP Poll

The 2017 Ivy League women's basketball tournament was a women's college conference tournament held March 11–12, 2017, at the Palestra on the campus of the University of Pennsylvania in Philadelphia. It was the first postseason tournament held by the Ivy League in women's basketball. Penn won the tournament, earning an automatic bid to the 2017 NCAA tournament.

== Background ==
The Ivy League was the last NCAA Division I conference not to hold a postseason tournament, instead choosing to award its automatic bids to the NCAA men's and women's tournaments to its regular-season champions. In March 2016, the Ivies announced that they would institute men's and women's conference tournaments beginning with the 2016–17 season. Both tournaments will initially be held at the same site. The conference also reduced by one the number of regular-season games that its members are allowed to schedule.

== Seeds ==
The top four teams in the Ivy League regular-season standings will participate in the tournament and will be seeded according to their records in conference play, resulting in a Shaughnessy playoff.

Seed	School	Conference	Tiebreaker
1	Penn	13-1	
2	Princeton	9-5	
3	Harvard	8-6	
4	Brown	7-7	2-0 vs. Cornell

== Schedule ==
Session	Game	Time*	Matchup^{#}	Television	Attendance
Semifinals – Saturday, March 11
1	1	11:00 AM	#1 Penn vs. #4 Brown	ESPN3	6,209
1	2	6:30 PM	#2 Princeton vs. #3 Harvard	ESPN3	6,209
Championship – Sunday, March 12
2	3	4:00 PM	#1 Penn vs. #2 Princeton	ESPNU	3,833
*Game times in Eastern Time. #Rankings denote tournament seeding.

== Bracket ==
Semifinals; Saturday, March 11; The Palestra
1	Penn	71
4	Brown	60
2	Princeton	68
3	Harvard	47

Championship game Sunday, March 12; The Palestra
1	Penn	57
2	Princeton	49

== Broadcasters ==
- TV/Internet Streaming– ESPN: Brenda VanLengen & Carol Ross– All games
- Radio– Westwood One: Lance Medow & Kim Adams– Championship

== See also ==
- 2017 Ivy League men's basketball tournament
