= 2016–17 Dartmouth Big Green women's basketball team =

Intercollegiate basketball season

2016–17 Dartmouth Big Green women's basketball
- Conference: Ivy League
- Record: 8–19 (3–11 Ivy)
- Head coach: Belle Koclanes (4th season)
- Assistant coaches: Addie Micir; Geleisa George; Steve Harney
- Home arena: Leede Arena

2016–17 Ivy League women's basketball standings
	Conf.				Overall
Team	W		L	PCT	W		L	PCT
Penn†	13	–	1	.929	22	–	7	.759
Princeton	9	–	5	.643	16	–	13	.552
Harvard	8	–	6	.571	21	–	9	.700
Cornell	7	–	7	.500	16	–	11	.593
Brown	7	–	7	.500	16	–	12	.571
Yale	6	–	8	.429	15	–	12	.556
Columbia	3	–	11	.214	13	–	14	.481
Dartmouth	3	–	11	.214	8	–	19	.296
† 2017 Ivy League Tournament winner Rankings from AP Poll

The 2016–17 Dartmouth Big Green women's basketball team represented Dartmouth College during the 2016–17 NCAA Division I women's basketball season. The Big Green, led by fourth year head coach Belle Koclanes, played their home games at Leede Arena and were members of the Ivy League. They finished the season 8–19, 3–11 in Ivy League play to finish in a tie for seventh place.

== Ivy League changes ==
This season, the Ivy League will institute conference postseason tournaments. The tournaments will only award the Ivy League automatic bids for the NCAA Division I Men's and Women's Basketball Tournaments; the official conference championships will continue to be awarded based solely on regular-season results. The Ivy League playoff will take place March 11 and 12 at the Palestra in Philadelphia. There will be two semifinal games on the first day with the No. 1 seed playing the No. 4 seed and the No. 2 seed playing the No. 3 seed. The final will be played the next day for the NCAA bid.

== Roster ==
2016–17 Dartmouth Big Green women's basketball team
Players
Coaches

Pos.	#	Name	Height	Year	Previous school	Hometown
G	1	Cy Lippold	5 ft 2 in (1.57 m)	So	Blair Academy	East Stroudsburg, PA
G	2	Annie McKenna	5 ft 5 in (1.65 m)	Fr	Trinity	Elmwood Park, IL
C	3	Olivia Smith	6 ft 2 in (1.88 m)	Jr	Catherine McAuley	Yarmouth, ME
G	4	Amber Mixon	5 ft 6 in (1.68 m)	Jr	Forest Park	Woodbridge, VA
G	5	Grace Phillips	6 ft 0 in (1.83 m)	Fr	Bishop Shanahan	Downingtown, PA
F	11	Danielle Nieters	6 ft 0 in (1.83 m)	Fr	Bishop McGuinness	Clemmons, SC
F	13	Gabby Hunter	5 ft 10 in (1.78 m)	Fr	Tilton School	Bedford, NH
G	14	Kate Letkewicz	6 ft 0 in (1.83 m)	Jr	Waterloo West	Waterloo, IA
G/F	15	Fanni Szabo	6 ft 1 in (1.85 m)	Sr	Britannica International School	Budapest, Hungary
G	21	Kealy Brown	5 ft 8 in (1.73 m)	So	Liberty	Henderson, NV
F	23	Julianna Thomson	6 ft 2 in (1.88 m)	Fr	Woodland Christian	Conestogo, ON
F	23	Isalys Quiñones	6 ft 3 in (1.91 m)	So	Otay Ranch	Chula Vista, CA
F	31	Emily Dryden	6 ft 3 in (1.91 m)	So	Mullen	Lakewood, CO
G	32	Emily Slangle	5 ft 10 in (1.78 m)	Jr	Martin	Arlington, TX
F	33	Andi Norman	6 ft 0 in (1.83 m)	Jr	Upper Arlington	Upper Arlington, OH
G/F	52	Paula Lemart	5 ft 11 in (1.8 m)	Fr	Northfield Mount Hermon	Covasna, Romania

Head coach

- Belle Koclanes (Richmond)

Assistant coach(es)

- Addie Micir (Princeton)
- Geleisa George (American)
- Steve Harney (Dickinson)

Legend

- (C) Team captain
- (S) Suspended
- (I) Ineligible
- (W) Walk-on
- Injured
- Current redshirt

Roster

== Schedule ==
Date time, TV	Rank^{#}	Opponent^{#}	Result	Record	Site (attendance) city, state
Non-conference regular season
11/11/2016*; 5:30 pm		Central Connecticut	W 61–51	1–0	Leede Arena (611); Hanover, NH
11/13/2016*; 2:00 pm		at Vermont	L 54–59	1–1	Patrick Gym (580); Burlington, VT
11/23/2016*; 2:00 pm		Holy Cross	W 53–49	2–1	Leede Arena (727); Hanover, NH
11/26/2016*; 12:00 pm		Army	L 60–68	2–2	Leede Arena; Hanover, NH
11/30/2016*; 11:00 am		at Old Dominion	L 56–82	2–3	Ted Constant Convocation Center (8,563); Norfolk, VA
12/01/2016*; 7:00 pm		at William & Mary	L 50–63	2–4	Kaplan Arena (381); Williamsburg, VA
12/07/2016*; 5:30 pm		at Boston University	W 61–49	3–4	Case Gym; Boston, MA
12/10/2016*; 1:00 pm		at Maine	L 55–60	3–5	Cross Insurance Center (1,538); Bangor, ME
12/17/2016*; 2:00 pm		Marist	L 61–66	3–6	Leede Arena (532); Hanover, NH
12/18/2016*; 4:00 pm		at Rhode Island	W 62–52	4–6	Ryan Center (399); Kingston, RI
12/21/2016*; 11:00 am		at Boston College	L 53–65	4–7	Conte Forum (2,138); Chestnut Hill, MA
12/29/2016*; 7:00 pm		Albany	W 69–61 ^{OT}	5–7	Leede Arena (213); Hanover, NH
12/31/2016*; 1:00 pm		at New Hampshire; Rivalry	L 47–64	5–8	Lundholm Gym (496); Durham, NH
Ivy League regular season
01/07/2017; 2:00 pm		at Harvard	L 65–70	5–9 (0–1)	Lavietes Pavilion (572); Cambridge, MA
01/21/2017; 6:00 pm, ESPN3		Harvard	L 61–70	5–10 (0–2)	Leede Arena (877); Hanover, NH
01/27/2017; 7:00 pm		Columbia	L 88–91 ^{4OT}	5–11 (0–3)	Leede Arena (529); Hanover, NH
01/28/2017; 6:00 pm, ESPN3		Cornell	W 84–74	6–11 (1–3)	Leede Arena (1,117); Hanover, NH
02/03/2017; 7:00 pm		at Princeton	L 55–85	6–12 (1–4)	Jadwin Gymnasium (906); Princeton, NJ
02/04/2017; 7:00 pm		at Penn	L 38–68	6–13 (1–5)	Palestra (727); Philadelphia, PA
02/10/2017; 7:00 pm		Yale	L 50–57	6–14 (1–6)	Leede Arena (487); Hanover, NH
02/11/2017; 6:00 pm		Brown	L 62–65	6–15 (1–7)	Leede Arena (181); Hanover, NH
02/17/2017; 6:00 pm, ESPN3		at Cornell	L 57–72	6–16 (1–8)	Newman Arena (467); Ithaca, NY
02/18/2017; 6:00 pm		at Columbia	L 48–69	6–17 (1–9)	Levien Gymnasium (532); New York City, NY
02/24/2017; 6:00 pm, ESPN3		at Brown	W 92–88 ^{OT}	7–17 (2–9)	Pizzitola Sports Center (243); Providence, RI
02/25/2017; 7:30 pm		at Yale	L 44–58	7–18 (2–10)	John J. Lee Amphitheater (1,103); New Haven, CT
03/03/2017; 7:00 pm		Penn	L 47–60	7–19 (2–11)	Leede Arena (546); Hanover, NH
03/04/2017; 6:00 pm, ESPN3		Princeton	W 58–56	8–19 (3–11)	Leede Arena (768); Hanover, NH
*Non-conference game. ^{#}Rankings from AP Poll. (#) Tournament seedings in parentheses. All times are in Eastern Time.

== See also ==
- 2016–17 Dartmouth Big Green men's basketball team
