= Goldey–Beacom Lightning =

- University: Goldey–Beacom College
- Conference: CACC
- NCAA: Division II
- Athletic director: Jeremy Benoit
- Location: Wilmington, Delaware
- Varsity teams: 13
- Basketball arena: Joseph West Jones Center
- Baseball stadium: Jackson Athletic Complex
- Soccer stadium: Nancy Churchman Sawin Field
- Golf course: Deerfield Golf Club
- Tennis venue: Delcastle Tennis Center
- Mascot: Strike
- Nickname: Lightning
- Colors: Navy Blue and Vegas Gold
- Website: www.gbcathletics.com

The Goldey–Beacom Lightning are the athletic teams that represent Goldey–Beacom College, located in Wilmington, Delaware, in intercollegiate sports. It is a member of the NCAA Division II ranks in all sports, primarily competing as a member of the Central Atlantic Collegiate Conference (CACC) since the 1999–2000 academic year.

== Varsity teams ==
Goldey–Beacom competes in 13 intercollegiate varsity sports: Men's sports include baseball, basketball, cross country, golf, soccer and track & field; while women's sports include basketball, cross country, soccer, softball, tennis, volleyball and track & field.

== Conference history ==
=== Associations ===
- National Association of Intercollegiate Athletics (1998–2002)
- National Collegiate Athletic Association (2002–present)

=== Conference ===
- Central Atlantic Collegiate Conference (1999–present)
