= Patriot League women's basketball tournament =

College conference basketball tournament

- Conference basketball championship
- Sport: College basketball
- Conference: Patriot League
- Number of teams: 10
- Format: Single-elimination tournament
- Current stadium: on-campus sites
- Current location: on-campus sites
- Played: 1991–present
- Last contest: 2025
- Current champion: Lehigh Mountain Hawks
- Most championships: Holy Cross Crusaders (13)
- Official website: PatriotLeague.org Women's Basketball

The Patriot League women's basketball tournament is the annual conference women's basketball championship tournament for the NCAA Division I Patriot League. The tournament has been held annually since 1991. It is a single-elimination tournament and seeding is based on regular season records.

The tournament champion receives the conference's automatic bid to the NCAA Women's Division I Basketball Championship.

== Results ==
| Year | Champion | Score | Runner-up | Location |
|---|---|---|---|---|
| 1991 | Holy Cross (1) | 65–52 | Army | Hart Center, Worcester, Massachusetts |
| 1992 | Fordham (1) | 65–54 | Lafayette | Stabler Arena, Bethlehem, Pennsylvania |
| 1993 | Holy Cross (2) | 82–63 | Fordham | First rounds at campus locations Davis Gym, Lewisburg, Pennsylvania (final) |
| 1994 | Fordham (2) | 64–60 | Holy Cross | Alumni Hall, Annapolis, Maryland |
| 1995 | Holy Cross (3) | 58–51 | Fordham | first rounds at Christl Arena, West Point, New York; Hart Center, Worcester, Massachusetts (final) |
| 1996 | Holy Cross (4) | 77–55 | Colgate | Hart Center; Worcester, Massachusetts |
| 1997 | Lehigh (1) | 65–63 | Lafayette | Stabler Arena; Bethlehem, Pennsylvania |
| 1998 | Holy Cross (5) | 67–60 | Navy | Alumni Hall final at Hart Center, Worcester, Mass. |
| 1999 | Holy Cross (6) | 72–58 | Navy | first rounds at Christl Arena final at Hart Center, Worcester, Mass. |
| 2000 | Holy Cross (7) | 87–63 | Bucknell | Kirby Sports Center final at Hart Center, Worcester, Mass. |
| 2001 | Holy Cross (8) | 94–68 | Lehigh | first rounds at Alumni Hall final at Hart Center, Worcester, Mass. |
| 2002 | Bucknell (1) | 88–74 | Holy Cross | first rounds at Show Place Arena, Upper Marlboro, Maryland final at Hart Center, Worcester Mass. |
| 2003 | Holy Cross (9) | 78–65 | Army | first rounds at Show Place Arena final at Hart Center, Worcester, Mass. |
| 2004 | Colgate (1) | 71–60 | American | first rounds at Show Place Arena final at Cotterell Court, Hamilton, New York |
| 2005 | Holy Cross (10) | 79–70 | Colgate | first rounds at Hart Center and Stabler Arena final at Hart Center |
| 2006 | Army (1) | 69–68 | Holy Cross | first rounds at Christl Arena, West Point, New York, and Hart Center final at Christl Arena |
| 2007 | Holy Cross (11) | 56–48 | American | first rounds at Alumni Hall final at Hart Center |
| 2008 | Bucknell (2) | 57–45 | Holy Cross | Christl Arena; Bill Bradley Center, Mahwah, New Jersey final at Hart Center |
| 2009 | Lehigh (2) | 64–56 | Lafayette | Stabler Arena, Lehigh University, Bethlehem, Pennsylvania final at highest remaining seed |
| 2010 | Lehigh (3) | 58–42 | American | Stabler Arena, Lehigh University |
| 2011 | Navy (1) | 47–40 | American | Annapolis, Maryland |
| 2012 | Navy (2) | 57–48 | Holy Cross | Final at Alumni Hall |
| 2013 | Navy (3) | 72–53 | Holy Cross | Final at Alumni Hall |
| 2014 | Army (2) | 68–58 | Holy Cross | Final at Christl Arena |
| 2015 | American (1) | 66–50 | Lehigh | Final at Bender Arena, Washington, DC |
| 2016 | Army (3) | 69–51 | Loyola Maryland | Final at Christl Arena |
| 2017 | Bucknell (3) | 79–71 | Navy | Final at Sojka Pavilion |
| 2018 | American (2) | 58–49 | Navy | Final at Bender Arena, Washington, D.C. |
| 2019 | Bucknell (4) | 66–54 | American | Final at Sojka Pavilion |
| 2020 | Cancelled due to the COVID-19 pandemic. | | | |
| 2021 | Lehigh (4) | 64–54 | Boston University | Final at Case Gym, Boston, Massachusetts |
| 2022 | American (3) | 65–54 | Bucknell | Final at Bender Arena, Washington, D.C. |
| 2023 | Holy Cross (12) | 66–61 | Boston University | Final at Case Gym, Boston, Massachusetts |
| 2024 | Holy Cross (13) | 61–55 | Boston University | Final at Hart Center, Worcester, Massachusetts |
| 2025 | Lehigh (5) | 74-62 | Army | Final at Stabler Arena, Bethlehem, Pennsylvania |
| 2026 | Holy Cross (14) | 77-70 | Lehigh | Final at Hart Center, Worcester, Massachusetts |

== Championships by school ==
| School | Championships | Championship Years |
|---|---|---|
| Holy Cross | 14 | 1991, 1993, 1995, 1996, 1998, 1999, 2000, 2001, 2003, 2005, 2007, 2023, 2024, 2026 |
| Lehigh | 5 | 1997, 2009, 2010, 2021, 2025 |
| Bucknell | 4 | 2002, 2008, 2017, 2019 |
| Navy | 3 | 2011, 2012, 2013 |
| Army | 3 | 2006, 2014, 2016 |
| American | 3 | 2015, 2018, 2022 |
| Fordham | 2 | 1992, 1994 |
| Colgate | 1 | 2004 |

- Schools highlighted in pink are former members of the Patriot League.
- Boston University, Lafayette, and Loyola Maryland have not yet won a Patriot League tournament.

== See also ==
- Patriot League men's basketball tournament
