= 2023–24 Army Black Knights women's basketball team =

American college basketball season

2023–24 Army Black Knights women's basketball
- Conference: Patriot League
- Record: 12–17 (9–9 Patriot)
- Head coach: Missy Traversi (3rd season)
- Assistant coaches: Tony DiClemente; Anthony Angotti; Sacha Santimano; Kennedi Thompson; Darren Sorenson
- Home arena: Christl Arena

2023–24 Patriot League women's basketball standings
	Conf.				Overall
Team	W		L	PCT	W		L	PCT
Holy Cross †	11	–	7	.611	21	–	13	.618
Colgate	10	–	8	.556	20	–	14	.588
Boston University	10	–	8	.556	20	–	12	.625
Loyola	10	–	8	.556	16	–	15	.516
Lehigh	9	–	9	.500	17	–	13	.567
Army	9	–	9	.500	12	–	17	.414
Navy	9	–	9	.500	14	–	17	.452
Bucknell	9	–	9	.500	13	–	18	.419
American	8	–	10	.444	10	–	20	.333
Lafayette	5	–	13	.278	10	–	20	.333
† 2024 Patriot League tournament winner

The 2023–24 Army Black Knights women's basketball team represented the United States Military Academy during the 2023–24 NCAA Division I women's basketball season. The Black Knights, who were led by third-year head coach Missy Traversi, played their home games at Christl Arena in West Point, New York as members of the Patriot League.

== Previous season ==
The Black Knights finished the 2022–23 season 13–17, 10–8 in Patriot League play, to finish in a tie for fourth place. They defeated Colgate in the quarterfinals of the Patriot League tournament before falling to top-seeded Boston University in the semifinals.

== Roster ==
2023–24 Army Black Knights women's basketball team
Players
Coaches

Pos.	#	Name	Height	Year	Previous school	Hometown
G	0	June Chatterley	5 ft 8 in (1.73 m)	Fr	USMAPS	Aubrey, TX
G	1	Anna Eng	5 ft 8 in (1.73 m)	Fr	Fairfield	Croton-on-Hudson, NY
G	2	Sam McNaughton	5 ft 7 in (1.7 m)	Sr	Fairfax High School	Fairfax, VA
F	10	Addison Ainsworth	6 ft 0 in (1.83 m)	So	Black Hills High School	Olympia, WA
G	11	Carlee Casteel	5 ft 7 in (1.7 m)	Fr	Rogers Heritage High School	Rogers, AR
G	13	Trinity Hardy	5 ft 8 in (1.73 m)	Jr	Winter Haven High School	Lakeland, FL
G	15	Camryn Tade	5 ft 9 in (1.75 m)	Fr	Carroll Senior High School	Southlake, TX
G/F	20	Taylor Wilson	5 ft 10 in (1.78 m)	Fr	Archbishop John Carroll High School	Bryn Mawr, PA
G	21	Reese Ericson	5 ft 6 in (1.68 m)	So	Lakeridge High School	Lake Oswego, OR
F	23	Reagan Warren	5 ft 10 in (1.78 m)	Sr	Rowlett High School	Rowlett, TX
G/F	24	Alivia Stephens-Kirkman	5 ft 10 in (1.78 m)	So	Issaquah High School	Puyallup, WA
F	30	Kya Smith	6 ft 1 in (1.85 m)	Fr	Coronado High School	Lubbock, TX
F	31	Linden Madison	6 ft 1 in (1.85 m)	So	Monacan High School	Midlothian, VA
G/F	33	Fiona Hastick	5 ft 11 in (1.8 m)	Fr	USMAPS	Reston, VA
G	34	Lauren Lithgow	5 ft 9 in (1.75 m)	Sr	St. Rose High School	Manasquan, NJ
G/F	35	Soleil Montrose	5 ft 10 in (1.78 m)	Fr	Mater Dei High School	Irvine, CA

Head coach

- Missy Traversi (Maine)

Assistant coach(es)

- Tony DiClemente (Stony Brook)
- Anthony Angotti (St. John's)
- Sacha Santimano (Air Force)
- Kennedi Thompson (Binghamton)
- Darren Sorenson (Mount Senario)

Legend

- (C) Team captain
- (S) Suspended
- (I) Ineligible
- (W) Walk-on
- Injured
- Current redshirt

Roster
Last update: April 2, 2024

== Schedule and results ==
Date time, TV	Rank^{#}	Opponent^{#}	Result	Record	Site (attendance) city, state
Non-conference regular season
November 6, 2023*; 5:00 p.m., ESPN+		NJIT	L 57–73	0–1	Christl Arena (400); West Point, NY
November 9, 2023*; 7:00 p.m., ESPN+		at Marist	L 68–76	0–2	McCann Arena (1,047); Poughkeepsie, NY
November 12, 2023*; 1:00 p.m., ESPN+		Fairleigh Dickinson	W 71–63	1–2	Christl Arena (596); West Point, NY
November 17, 2023*; 9:00 p.m., MW Network		at Air Force	L 61–83	1–3	Clune Arena (776); Colorado Springs, CO
November 19, 2023*; 2:00 p.m., ESPN+		at TCU	L 51–88	1–4	Schollmaier Arena (1,957); Fort Worth, TX
November 22, 2023*; 1:00 p.m., ESPN+		Connecticut College	W 59–34	2–4	Christl Arena (579); West Point, NY
November 28, 2023*; 5:00 p.m., ESPN+		Hofstra	L 43–54	2–5	Christl Arena (125); West Point, NY
December 6, 2023*; 5:00 p.m., ESPN+		Vermont	L 42–62	2–6	Christl Arena (200); West Point, NY
December 20, 2023*; 1:00 p.m., ESPN+		Binghamton	L 51–73	2–7	Christl Arena (400); West Point, NY
December 30, 2023*; 5:00 p.m., ESPN+		Five Towns	W 87–52	3–7	Christl Arena (–); West Point, NY
Patriot League regular season
January 3, 2024; 6:00 p.m., ESPN+		Lafayette	L 42–68	3–8 (0–1)	Christl Arena (237); West Point, NY
January 6, 2024; 2:00 p.m., ESPN+		at Holy Cross	L 52–67	3–9 (0–2)	Hart Center (579); Worcester, MA
January 10, 2024; 7:00 p.m., ESPN+		at Loyola (MD)	W 55–45	4–9 (1–2)	Reitz Arena (134); Baltimore, MD
January 14, 2024; 2:00 p.m., ESPN+		American	L 69–75	4–10 (1–3)	Christl Arena (573); West Point, NY
January 17, 2024; 11:00 a.m., ESPN+		at Colgate	W 52–49	5–10 (2–3)	Cotterell Court (1,173); Hamilton, NY
January 20, 2024; 11:00 a.m., CBSSN		at Navy	W 66–51	6–10 (3–3)	Alumni Hall (5,255); Annapolis, MD
January 24, 2024; 6:00 p.m., ESPN+		Boston University	W 61–57	7–10 (4–3)	Christl Arena (321); West Point, NY
January 27, 2024; 3:30 p.m., ESPN+		at Bucknell	W 75–66	8–10 (5–3)	Sojka Pavilion (571); Lewisburg, PA
January 31, 2024; 11:00 a.m., ESPN+		Colgate	W 55–52	9–10 (6–3)	Christl Arena (2,979); West Point, NY
February 3, 2024; 2:00 p.m., ESPN+		at Lafayette	L 54–68	9–11 (6–4)	Kirby Sports Center (583); Easton, PA
February 10, 2024; 11:00 a.m., CBSSN		Navy	W 70–58	10–11 (7–4)	Christl Arena (1,000); West Point, NY
February 14, 2024; 6:00 p.m., ESPN+		at Boston University	L 64–72	10–12 (7–5)	Case Gym (432); Boston, MA
February 17, 2024; 1:00 p.m., ESPN+		Holy Cross	W 58–43	11–12 (8–5)	Christl Arena (787); West Point, NY
February 21, 2024; 6:00 p.m., ESPN+		at Lehigh	L 60–77	11–13 (8–6)	Stabler Arena (492); Bethlehem, PA
February 24, 2024; 1:00 p.m., ESPN+		Bucknell	L 63–65	11–14 (8–7)	Christl Arena (611); West Point, NY
February 27, 2024; 7:00 p.m., ESPN+		at American	W 66–52	12–14 (9–7)	Bender Arena (480); Washington, D.C.
March 2, 2024; 1:00 p.m., ESPN+		Loyola (MD)	L 52–55	12–15 (9–8)	Christl Arena (644); West Point, NY
March 6, 2024; 6:00 p.m., ESPN+		Lehigh	L 51–64	12–16 (9–9)	Christl Arena (647); West Point, NY
Patriot League tournament
March 11, 2024; 6:10 p.m., ESPN+	(6)	at (3) Boston University; Quarterfinals	L 62–64	12–17	Case Gym (483); Boston, MA
*Non-conference game. ^{#}Rankings from AP poll. (#) Tournament seedings in parentheses. All times are in Eastern.
