= 2023–24 American Eagles women's basketball team =

American college basketball season

2023–24 American Eagles women's basketball
- Conference: Patriot League
- Record: 10–20 (8–10 Patriot)
- Head coach: Tiffany Coll (2nd season)
- Assistant coaches: Kaity Healy; Michelle Holmes; Claire Mattox
- Home arena: Bender Arena

2023–24 Patriot League women's basketball standings
	Conf.				Overall
Team	W		L	PCT	W		L	PCT
Holy Cross †	11	–	7	.611	21	–	13	.618
Colgate	10	–	8	.556	20	–	14	.588
Boston University	10	–	8	.556	20	–	12	.625
Loyola	10	–	8	.556	16	–	15	.516
Lehigh	9	–	9	.500	17	–	13	.567
Army	9	–	9	.500	12	–	17	.414
Navy	9	–	9	.500	14	–	17	.452
Bucknell	9	–	9	.500	13	–	18	.419
American	8	–	10	.444	10	–	20	.333
Lafayette	5	–	13	.278	10	–	20	.333
† 2024 Patriot League tournament winner

The 2023–24 American Eagles women's basketball team represented American University during the 2023–24 NCAA Division I women's basketball season. The Eagles, who were led by second-year head coach Tiffany Coll, played their home games at Bender Arena located in Washington, D.C., as members of the Patriot League.

== Previous season ==
The Eagles finished the 2022–23 season 9–22, 7–11 in Patriot League play, to finish in a tie for seventh place. They defeated Navy in the first round of the Patriot League tournament, before falling to eventual tournament champions Holy Cross in the quarterfinals.

== Roster ==
2023–24 American Eagles women's basketball team
Players
Coaches

Pos.	#	Name	Height	Year	Previous school	Hometown
G	1	Anna Rescifina	5 ft 11 in (1.8 m)	So	Liceo Classico Goffredo Mameli	Sicily, Italy
G	2	Ivy Bales	5 ft 10 in (1.78 m)	Sr	Gatlinburg-Pittman High School	Gatlinburg, TN
G	3	Bailey Garbee	5 ft 11 in (1.8 m)	Jr	Quaker Valley High School	Sewickley, PA
G	4	Laura Nogues	5 ft 7 in (1.7 m)	So	Escola Pia de Sabadell	Sabadell, Spain
G	10	Anna LeMaster	5 ft 9 in (1.75 m)	Sr	Dayton	Ashburn, VA
G	13	Kayla Henning	5 ft 7 in (1.7 m)	Sr	Evanston Township High School	Evanston, IL
G	15	Riley DeRubbo	5 ft 8 in (1.73 m)	Sr	Fordham	Washington, PA
F	22	Grace Koepke	6 ft 4 in (1.93 m)	Fr	Vernon Hills High School	Vernon Hills, IL
F	23	Lauren Stack	6 ft 2 in (1.88 m)	GS	Benet Academy	St. Charles, IL
F	24	Marisa Lee	6 ft 1 in (1.85 m)	Sr	Hartford	Marlborough, CT
G	30	Lexi Salazar	5 ft 7 in (1.7 m)	Fr	Plainfield North High School	Plainfield, IL
F	44	Emily Johns	6 ft 1 in (1.85 m)	Sr	Washington Township High School	Washington Township, NJ
F	55	Molly Lavin	6 ft 2 in (1.88 m)	So	City of London Academy	London, England

Head coach

- Tiffany Coll (UMBC)

Assistant coach(es)

- Kaity Healy (Seton Hall)
- Michelle Holmes (American)
- Claire Mattox (Washington)

Legend

- (C) Team captain
- (S) Suspended
- (I) Ineligible
- (W) Walk-on
- Injured
- Current redshirt

Roster
Last update: April 18, 2024

== Schedule and results ==
Date time, TV	Rank^{#}	Opponent^{#}	Result	Record	Site (attendance) city, state
Non-conference regular season
November 6, 2023*; 7:00 p.m., ESPN+		Longwood	W 81–68	1–0	Bender Arena (644); Washington, D.C.
November 11, 2023*; 12:00 p.m., ESPN+		at La Salle	L 53–62	1–1	Tom Gola Arena (778); Philadelphia, PA
November 15, 2023*; 6:00 p.m., ESPN+		at George Washington	L 59–69	1–2	Charles E. Smith Center (422); Washington, D.C.
November 18, 2023*; 6:00 p.m., ESPN+		at Richmond	L 44–76	1–3	Robins Center (410); Richmond, VA
November 22, 2023*; 1:00 p.m., ESPN+		George Mason	L 62–72	1–4	Bender Arena (439); Washington, D.C.
November 29, 2023*; 7:00 p.m., ESPN+		Delaware	L 58–68	1–5	Bender Arena (432); Washington, D.C.
December 2, 2023*; 7:00 p.m., NEC Front Row		at Fairleigh Dickinson	W 63–57	2–5	Rothman Center (167); Hackensack, NJ
December 6, 2023*; 7:00 p.m., ESPN+		Monmouth	L 60–72	2–6	Bender Arena (212); Washington, D.C.
December 10, 2023*; 2:00 p.m., ESPN+		Towson	L 60–68	2–7	Bender Arena (379); Washington, D.C.
December 20, 2023*; 12:30 p.m., ESPN+		UMBC	L 59–60	2–8	Bender Arena (129); Washington, D.C.
December 30, 2023*; 2:00 p.m.		at Howard	L 57–75	2–9	Burr Gymnasium (498); Washington, D.C.
Patriot League regular season
January 3, 2024; 6:00 p.m., ESPN+		at Lehigh	W 68–65	3–9 (1–0)	Stabler Arena (467); Bethlehem, PA
January 6, 2024; 2:00 p.m., ESPN+		Bucknell	W 58–47	4–9 (2–0)	Bender Arena (394); Washington, D.C.
January 10, 2024; 11:30 a.m., ESPN+		Boston University	W 91–87 ^{2OT}	5–9 (3–0)	Bender Arena (908); Washington, D.C.
January 14, 2024; 2:00 p.m., ESPN+		at Army	W 75–69	6–9 (4–0)	Christl Arena (573); West Point, NY
January 17, 2024; 7:00 p.m., ESPN+		Loyola (MD)	L 55–59	6–10 (4–1)	Bender Arena (289); Washington, D.C.
January 20, 2024; 2:00 p.m., ESPN+		Lehigh	W 59–55	7–10 (5–1)	Bender Arena (534); Washington, D.C.
January 24, 2024; 7:00 p.m., ESPN+		at Holy Cross	L 48–59	7–11 (5–2)	Hart Center (984); Worcester, MA
January 27, 2024; 2:00 p.m., ESPN+		at Colgate	W 56–54	8–11 (6–2)	Cotterell Court (244); Hamilton, NY
January 31, 2024; 7:00 p.m., ESPN+		Lafayette	L 55–60	8–12 (6–3)	Bender Arena (391); Washington, D.C.
February 4, 2024; 2:00 p.m., ESPN+		at Bucknell	L 47–61	8–13 (6–4)	Sojka Pavilion (667); Lewisburg, PA
February 10, 2024; 3:00 p.m., ESPN+		Holy Cross	W 74–68	9–13 (7–4)	Bender Arena (594); Washington, D.C.
February 14, 2024; 7:00 p.m., ESPN+		Navy	L 55–69	9–14 (7–5)	Bender Arena (299); Washington, D.C.
February 17, 2024; 2:00 p.m., ESPN+		at Lafayette	L 57–64	9–15 (7–6)	Kirby Sports Center (367); Easton, PA
February 21, 2024; 6:00 p.m., ESPN+		at Boston University	L 56–58	9–16 (7–7)	Case Gym (650); Boston, MA
February 24, 2024; 4:00 p.m., ESPN+		Colgate	L 60–72	9–17 (7–8)	Bender Arena (665); Washington, D.C.
February 27, 2024; 7:00 p.m., ESPN+		Army	L 52–66	9–18 (7–9)	Bender Arena (480); Washington, D.C.
March 2, 2024; 12:00 p.m., ESPN+		at Navy	L 57–73	9–19 (7–10)	Alumni Hall (1,065); Annapolis, MD
March 6, 2024; 7:00 p.m., ESPN+		at Loyola (MD)	W 73–70	10–19 (8–10)	Reitz Arena (370); Baltimore, MD
Patriot League tournament
March 9, 2024; 7:00 p.m., ESPN+	(9)	at (8) Bucknell; First round	L 71–77	10–20	Sojka Pavilion (419); Lewisburg, PA
*Non-conference game. ^{#}Rankings from AP poll. (#) Tournament seedings in parentheses. All times are in Eastern.
