= 2023–24 Loyola Greyhounds women's basketball team =

American college basketball season

2023–24 Loyola Greyhounds women's basketball
- Conference: Patriot League
- Record: 16–15 (10–8 Patriot)
- Head coach: Danielle O'Banion (3rd season)
- Assistant coaches: Katherine Bixby; Diana Martinez; Annalese Lamke
- Home arena: Reitz Arena

2023–24 Patriot League women's basketball standings
	Conf.				Overall
Team	W		L	PCT	W		L	PCT
Holy Cross †	11	–	7	.611	21	–	13	.618
Colgate	10	–	8	.556	20	–	14	.588
Boston University	10	–	8	.556	20	–	12	.625
Loyola	10	–	8	.556	16	–	15	.516
Lehigh	9	–	9	.500	17	–	13	.567
Army	9	–	9	.500	12	–	17	.414
Navy	9	–	9	.500	14	–	17	.452
Bucknell	9	–	9	.500	13	–	18	.419
American	8	–	10	.444	10	–	20	.333
Lafayette	5	–	13	.278	10	–	20	.333
† 2024 Patriot League tournament winner

The 2023–24 Loyola Greyhounds women's basketball team represented Loyola University Maryland during the 2023–24 NCAA Division I women's basketball season. The Greyhounds, who were led by third-year head coach Danielle O'Banion, played their home games at Reitz Arena in Baltimore, Maryland as members of the Patriot League. The Greyhounds finished the season 16–15, 10–8 in Patriot League play, to finish in a three-way tie with Colgate and Boston University for second place.

== Previous season ==
The Greyhounds finished the 2022–23 season 10–21, 4–14 in Patriot League play, to finish in ninth place. They defeated Lafayette in the first round of the Patriot League tournament, before falling to top-seeded Boston University in the quarterfinals.

== Roster ==
2023–24 Loyola Greyhounds women's basketball team
Players
Coaches

Pos.	#	Name	Height	Year	Previous school	Hometown
G	1	Kelly Ratigan	5 ft 8 in (1.73 m)	So	St. Joseph HS	South Bend, IN
G	2	Meliah Van-Otoo	5 ft 4 in (1.63 m)	So	Westtown School	Drexel Hill, PA
C	4	Aminata Hernandez	6 ft 0 in (1.83 m)	Fr	Sant Gabriel	Gran Canaria, Spain
G	5	Kimmie Hicks	5 ft 9 in (1.75 m)	Fr	Saint Frances Academy	Annapolis, MD
F	10	Koi Sims	6 ft 0 in (1.83 m)	Jr	Albany	Glen Burnie, MD
G	11	Lex Therien	6 ft 1 in (1.85 m)	Jr	Cherokee HS	Marlton, NJ
G	12	Cristina Garcia	5 ft 9 in (1.75 m)	So	Pisgah HS	Sant Cugat del Vallès, Spain
G	13	Caramina Tañedo	5 ft 10 in (1.78 m)	Sr	St. John's College HS	Laurel, MD
G	15	Laura Salmerón	5 ft 8 in (1.73 m)	Jr	Institut Llavaneres	Sant Andreu de Llavaneres, Spain
G	20	Kailey Kalet	5 ft 8 in (1.73 m)	Fr	Union Springs HS	Union Springs, NY
G	21	Caroline Orza	5 ft 9 in (1.75 m)	So	Bethesda-Chevy Chase HS	Chevy Chase, MD
F	23	Marta Espinal	5 ft 11 in (1.8 m)	So	Les d'Auro School	Castellnou de Bages, Spain
F	24	Ally Lovisolo	6 ft 1 in (1.85 m)	So	Blair Academy	Allendale, NJ
G	34	Amandine Amorich	5 ft 11 in (1.8 m)	Fr	Cégep de Sainte-Foy	Montpellier, France
F	35	Ava Therien	5 ft 10 in (1.78 m)	GS	Cherokee HS	Marlton, NJ
C	55	Lily Bottomley	6 ft 2 in (1.88 m)	Fr	Northwest HS	Canal Fulton, OH

Head coach

- Danielle O'Banion (Boston College)

Assistant coach(es)

- Katherine Bixby (Ithaca)
- Diana Martinez (St. Andrews)
- Annalese Lamke (Minnesota)

Legend

- (C) Team captain
- (S) Suspended
- (I) Ineligible
- (W) Walk-on
- Injured
- Current redshirt

Roster
Last update: March 25, 2024

== Schedule and results ==
Date time, TV	Rank^{#}	Opponent^{#}	Result	Record	Site (attendance) city, state
Non-conference regular season
November 7, 2023*; 7:00 p.m., ESPN+		at West Virginia	L 39–74	0–1	WVU Coliseum (1,486); Morgantown, WV
November 12, 2023*; 5:00 p.m., ESPN+		Binghamton	W 77–73	1–1	Reitz Arena (382); Baltimore, MD
November 15, 2023*; 7:00 p.m., ESPN+		at UMBC	W 49–48	2–1	Chesapeake Employers Insurance Arena (718); Catonsville, MD
November 22, 2023*; 2:00 p.m., ESPN+		Saint Francis	W 53–45	3–1	Reitz Arena (215); Baltimore, MD
November 25, 2023*; 2:00 p.m., ESPN+		St. Bonaventure	L 51–55	3–2	Reitz Arena (230); Baltimore, MD
November 29, 2023*; 7:00 p.m., FloHoops		at St. John's	L 49–71	3–3	Carnesecca Arena (343); Queens, NY
December 2, 2023*; 12:00 p.m., ESPN+		Mount St. Mary's	W 63–42	4–3	Reitz Arena (321); Baltimore, MD
December 6, 2023*; 11:00 a.m., ESPN+		Bryant	L 54–63	4–4	Reitz Arena (1,349); Baltimore, MD
December 10, 2023*; 2:00 p.m., ESPN+		at Toledo	L 35–65	4–5	Savage Arena (3,860); Toledo, OH
December 22, 2023*; 2:00 p.m., FloHoops		at Monmouth	L 50–63	4–6	OceanFirst Bank Center (597); West Long Branch, NJ
December 30, 2023*; 2:00 p.m.		at Delaware State	W 66–64	5–6	Memorial Hall (350); Dover, DE
Patriot League regular season
January 3, 2024; 7:00 p.m., ESPN+		Colgate	L 65–73	5–7 (0–1)	Reitz Arena (148); Baltimore, MD
January 6, 2024; 2:00 p.m., ESPN+		at Lehigh	W 73–65	6–7 (1–1)	Stabler Arena (485); Bethlehem, PA
January 10, 2024; 7:00 p.m., ESPN+		Army	L 45–55	6–8 (1–2)	Reitz Arena (134); Baltimore, MD
January 13, 2024; 2:00 p.m., ESPN+		at Boston University	L 48–55	6–9 (1–3)	Case Gym (456); Boston, MA
January 17, 2024; 7:00 p.m., ESPN+		at American	W 59–55	7–9 (2–3)	Bender Arena (289); Washington, D.C.
January 20, 2024; 3:00 p.m., ESPN+		Holy Cross	L 51–71	7–10 (2–4)	Reitz Arena (363); Baltimore, MD
January 24, 2024; 6:00 p.m., ESPN+		at Lafayette	W 67–60	8–10 (3–4)	Kirby Sports Center (274); Easton, PA
January 27, 2024; 5:00 p.m., ESPN+		Navy	W 70–67	9–10 (4–4)	Reitz Arena (279); Baltimore, MD
January 31, 2024; 7:00 p.m., ESPN+		Bucknell	L 59–61	9–11 (4–5)	Reitz Arena (242); Baltimore, MD
February 3, 2024; 2:00 p.m., ESPN+		at Holy Cross	W 60–47	10–11 (5–5)	Hart Center (1,091); Worcester, MA
February 10, 2024; 2:00 p.m., ESPN+		at Colgate	W 64–61	11–11 (6–5)	Cotterell Court (443); Hamilton, NY
February 14, 2024; 7:00 p.m., ESPN+		Lafayette	W 76–51	12–11 (7–5)	Reitz Arena (133); Baltimore, MD
February 18, 2024; 2:00 p.m., ESPN+		Lehigh	W 93–76	13–11 (8–5)	Reitz Arena (953); Baltimore, MD
February 21, 2024; 7:00 p.m., ESPN+		at Navy	L 51–53	13–12 (8–6)	Alumni Hall (814); Annapolis, MD
February 24, 2024; 5:00 p.m., ESPN+		Boston University	W 70–65 ^{OT}	14–12 (9–6)	Reitz Arena (283); Baltimore, MD
February 28, 2024; 6:00 p.m., ESPN+		at Bucknell	L 56–74	14–13 (9–7)	Sojka Pavilion (391); Lewisburg, PA
March 2, 2024; 1:00 p.m., ESPN+		at Army	W 55–52	15–13 (10–7)	Christl Arena (644); West Point, NY
March 6, 2024; 7:00 p.m., ESPN+		American	L 70–73	15–14 (10–8)	Reitz Arena (370); Baltimore, MD
Patriot League tournament
March 11, 2024; 7:10 p.m., ESPN+	(4)	(5) Lehigh; Quarterfinals	W 58–51	16–14	Reitz Arena (737); Baltimore, MD
March 14, 2024; 7:00 p.m., ESPN+	(4)	at (1) Holy Cross; Semifinals	L 54–72	16–15	Hart Center (754); Worcester, MA
*Non-conference game. ^{#}Rankings from AP poll. (#) Tournament seedings in parentheses. All times are in Eastern.
