= 2023–24 Lehigh Mountain Hawks women's basketball team =

American college basketball season

2023–24 Lehigh Mountain Hawks women's basketball
- Conference: Patriot League
- Record: 17–13 (9–9 Patriot)
- Head coach: Addie Micir (2nd season)
- Associate head coach: Glenn Rigney
- Assistant coaches: Kaitlyn Cresencia; Kaitlyn Lewis
- Home arena: Stabler Arena

2023–24 Patriot League women's basketball standings
	Conf.				Overall
Team	W		L	PCT	W		L	PCT
Holy Cross †	11	–	7	.611	21	–	13	.618
Colgate	10	–	8	.556	20	–	14	.588
Boston University	10	–	8	.556	20	–	12	.625
Loyola	10	–	8	.556	16	–	15	.516
Lehigh	9	–	9	.500	17	–	13	.567
Army	9	–	9	.500	12	–	17	.414
Navy	9	–	9	.500	14	–	17	.452
Bucknell	9	–	9	.500	13	–	18	.419
American	8	–	10	.444	10	–	20	.333
Lafayette	5	–	13	.278	10	–	20	.333
† 2024 Patriot League tournament winner

The 2023–24 Lehigh Mountain Hawks women's basketball team represented Lehigh University during the 2023–24 NCAA Division I women's basketball season. The Mountain Hawks, who were led by second-year head coach Addie Micir, played their home games at Stabler Arena located in Bethlehem, Pennsylvania, as members of the Patriot League.

== Previous season ==
The Mountain Hawks finished the 2022–23 season 17–14, 12–6 in Patriot League play, to finish in third place. They defeated Bucknell in the quarterfinals of the Patriot League tournament before falling to eventual tournament champions Holy Cross in the semifinals.

== Roster ==
2023–24 Lehigh Mountain Hawks women's basketball team
Players
Coaches

Pos.	#	Name	Height	Year	Previous school	Hometown
G	0	Julianna Ouimette	5 ft 10 in (1.78 m)	Fr	Lakeland Union High School	Minocqua, WI
G/F	2	Remi Sisselman	6 ft 0 in (1.83 m)	Jr	Bucknell	Melville, NY
G	3	Kamara St. Paul	5 ft 9 in (1.75 m)	So	New Rochelle High School	New Rochelle, NY
G	5	Ella Stemmer	5 ft 10 in (1.78 m)	Jr	Saline High School	Ann Arbor, MI
G/F	10	Katie Hurt	5 ft 11 in (1.8 m)	So	John Marshall High School	Rochester, MN
G	11	Fabienne Eggenschwiler	5 ft 11 in (1.8 m)	Sr	Red Bank Catholic High School	Tinton Falls, NJ
G/F	12	Jamie Behar	6 ft 1 in (1.85 m)	Sr	Long Island Lutheran High School	Oceanside, NY
G	14	Kaylee Van Eps	6 ft 0 in (1.83 m)	Jr	Chaska High School	Chaska, MN
G	15	Jessie Ozzauto	5 ft 10 in (1.78 m)	Fr	Huntley High School	Algonquin, IL
G	22	Maddie Albrecht	6 ft 0 in (1.83 m)	Sr	Billings West High School	Billings, MT
G	23	Gracyn Lovette	5 ft 10 in (1.78 m)	Fr	Marin Catholic High School	San Rafael, CA
F	30	Whitney Lind	6 ft 2 in (1.88 m)	Fr	Randall K. Cooper High School	Florence, KY
G	31	Colleen McQuillen	5 ft 10 in (1.78 m)	Jr	Fordham	Cresskill, NJ
F	33	Meghan O'Brien	6 ft 1 in (1.85 m)	Jr	Chantilly High School	Centreville, VA
F	34	Lily Fandre	6 ft 1 in (1.85 m)	So	Eagan High School	Eagan, MN

Head coach

- Addie Micir (Princeton)

Assistant coach(es)

- Glenn Rigney (Miami (FL))
- Kaitlyn Cresencia (Connecticut College)
- Kaitlyn Lewis (American)

Legend

- (C) Team captain
- (S) Suspended
- (I) Ineligible
- (W) Walk-on
- Injured
- Current redshirt

Roster
Last update: April 2, 2024

== Schedule and results ==
Date time, TV	Rank^{#}	Opponent^{#}	Result	Record	Site (attendance) city, state
Non-conference regular season
November 6, 2023*; 5:00 p.m., ESPN+		East Stroudsburg	W 78–42	1–0	Stabler Arena (461); Bethlehem, PA
November 11, 2023*; 2:00 p.m., NEC Front Row		at Stonehill	W 62–50	2–0	Merkert Gymnasium (360); Easton, MA
November 14, 2023*; 7:00 p.m., FloHoops		at Delaware	W 78–77	3–0	Bob Carpenter Center (1,124); Newark, DE
November 17, 2023*; 6:00 p.m., ESPN+		Yale	W 90–75	4–0	Stabler Arena (494); Bethlehem, PA
November 22, 2023*; 2:30 p.m.		vs. Marist; Savannah Hoops Invitational	W 82–64	5–0	Enmarket Arena (97); Savannah, GA
November 23, 2023*; 9:00 a.m.		vs. Bowling Green; Savannah Hoops Invitational	L 73–85	5–1	Enmarket Arena (104); Savannah, GA
November 28, 2023*; 6:00 p.m., ESPN+		Drexel	W 58–57	6–1	Stabler Arena (482); Bethlehem, PA
December 3, 2023*; 2:00 p.m., FloHoops		at Hofstra	W 68–56	7–1	Mack Sports Complex (429); Hempstead, NY
December 7, 2023*; 7:00 p.m., ESPN+		La Salle	W 106–60	8–1	Stabler Arena (703); Bethlehem, PA
December 10, 2023*; 2:00 p.m., ACCNX		at Pittsburgh	L 82–94	8–2	Petersen Events Center (983); Pittsburgh, PA
December 30, 2023*; 2:00 p.m., ESPN+		Rider	L 57–67 ^{OT}	8–3	Stabler Arena (569); Bethlehem, PA
Patriot League regular season
January 3, 2024; 6:00 p.m., ESPN+		American	L 65–68	8–4 (0–1)	Stabler Arena (467); Bethlehem, PA
January 6, 2024; 2:00 p.m., ESPN+		Loyola (MD)	L 65–73	8–5 (0–2)	Stabler Arena (485); Bethlehem, PA
January 10, 2024; 6:00 p.m., ESPN+		at Bucknell	W 69–63	9–5 (1–2)	Sojka Pavilion (462); Lewisburg, PA
January 13, 2024; 2:00 p.m., ESPN+		at Holy Cross	L 54–75	9–6 (1–3)	Hart Center (693); Worcester, MA
January 17, 2024; 6:00 p.m., ESPN+		Navy	W 81–65	10–6 (2–3)	Stabler Arena (448); Bethlehem, PA
January 20, 2024; 2:00 p.m., ESPN+		at American	L 55–59	10–7 (2–4)	Bender Arena (534); Washington, D.C.
January 22, 2024; 4:00 p.m., CBSSN		at Colgate	W 79–61	11–7 (3–4)	Cotterell Court (243); Hamilton, NY
January 27, 2024; 2:00 p.m., ESPN+		Holy Cross	W 70–60	12–7 (4–4)	Stabler Arena (734); Bethlehem, PA
January 31, 2024; 7:00 p.m., ESPN+		at Navy	L 46–62	12–8 (4–5)	Alumni Hall (718); Annapolis, MD
February 3, 2024; 2:00 p.m., ESPN+		Boston University	W 64–62	13–8 (5–5)	Stabler Arena (983); Bethlehem, PA
February 10, 2024; 2:00 p.m., ESPN+		at Lafayette	W 70–68 ^{OT}	14–8 (6–5)	Kirby Sports Center (647); Easton, PA
February 14, 2024; 6:00 p.m., ESPN+		Bucknell	L 49–54	14–9 (6–6)	Stabler Arena (503); Bethlehem, PA
February 18, 2024; 2:00 p.m., ESPN+		at Loyola (MD)	L 76–93	14–10 (6–7)	Reitz Arena (953); Baltimore, MD
February 21, 2024; 6:00 p.m., ESPN+		Army	W 77–60	15–10 (7–7)	Stabler Arena (492); Bethlehem, PA
February 24, 2024; 7:30 p.m., ESPN+		Lafayette	L 63–68	15–11 (7–8)	Stabler Arena (766); Bethlehem, PA
February 28, 2024; 6:00 p.m., ESPN+		at Boston University	L 78–89	15–12 (7–9)	Case Gym (685); Boston, MA
March 2, 2024; 4:30 p.m., ESPN+		Colgate	W 55–47	16–12 (8–9)	Stabler Arena (619); Bethlehem, PA
March 6, 2024; 6:00 p.m., ESPN+		at Army	W 64–51	17–12 (9–9)	Christl Arena (647); West Point, NY
Patriot League tournament
March 11, 2024; 7:10 p.m., ESPN+	(5)	at (4) Loyola (MD); Quarterfinals	L 51–58	17–13	Reitz Arena (737); Baltimore, MD
*Non-conference game. ^{#}Rankings from AP poll. (#) Tournament seedings in parentheses. All times are in Eastern.
