= 2023–24 Colgate Raiders women's basketball team =

American college basketball season

2023–24 Colgate Raiders women's basketball

WNIT, Super 16
- Conference: Patriot League
- Record: 20–14 (10–8 Patriot)
- Head coach: Ganiyat Adeduntan (3rd season)
- Assistant coaches: Jason Asbell; Macey Hollenshead; Ethan Kenney; Jasmine Whitney
- Home arena: Cotterell Court

2023–24 Patriot League women's basketball standings
| | Conf. | | | | Overall |
| Team | W | | L | PCT | W | | L | PCT |
|---|---|---|---|---|---|---|---|---|
| Holy Cross † | 11 | – | 7 | .611 | 21 | – | 13 | .618 |
| Colgate | 10 | – | 8 | .556 | 20 | – | 14 | .588 |
| Boston University | 10 | – | 8 | .556 | 20 | – | 12 | .625 |
| Loyola | 10 | – | 8 | .556 | 16 | – | 15 | .516 |
| Lehigh | 9 | – | 9 | .500 | 17 | – | 13 | .567 |
| Army | 9 | – | 9 | .500 | 12 | – | 17 | .414 |
| Navy | 9 | – | 9 | .500 | 14 | – | 17 | .452 |
| Bucknell | 9 | – | 9 | .500 | 13 | – | 18 | .419 |
| American | 8 | – | 10 | .444 | 10 | – | 20 | .333 |
| Lafayette | 5 | – | 13 | .278 | 10 | – | 20 | .333 |
† 2024 Patriot League tournament winner

The 2023–24 Colgate Raiders women's basketball team represented Colgate University during the 2023–24 NCAA Division I women's basketball season. The Raiders, led by third-year head coach Ganiyat Adeduntan, played their home games at Cotterell Court located in Hamilton, New York as members of the Patriot League.

== Previous season ==
The Raiders finished the 2022–23 season 16–14, 10–8 in Patriot League play, to finish in a tie for fourth place. They were defeated by Army in the quarterfinals of the Patriot League tournament.

== Roster ==
2023–24 Colgate Raiders women's basketball team
Players
Coaches

| Pos. | # | Name | Height | Year | Previous school | Hometown |
|---|---|---|---|---|---|---|
| G/F | 0 | Amarah Streiff | 5 ft 10 in (1.78 m) | Fr | Bishop Ludden High School | Syracuse, NY |
| G | 1 | Morgan McMahon | 5 ft 10 in (1.78 m) | Jr | Saint James School | Hagerstown, MD |
| G/F | 2 | Christina Midgette | 6 ft 0 in (1.83 m) | So | Franklin High School | Princeton, NJ |
| G | 3 | Alexa Brodie | 5 ft 6 in (1.68 m) | Sr | Central Bucks High School South | Chalfont, PA |
| G | 4 | Madison Schiller | 5 ft 8 in (1.73 m) | So | Ramapo High School | Wyckoff, NJ |
| G | 5 | Taylor Golembiewski | 5 ft 8 in (1.73 m) | Jr | Edwin O. Smith High School | Columbia, CT |
| F | 11 | Tiasia McMillan | 6 ft 0 in (1.83 m) | Sr | Carrollwood Day School | Seffner, FL |
| F | 13 | Sophia Diehl | 6 ft 1 in (1.85 m) | Jr | Roland Park Country School | Westminster, MD |
| G | 21 | Lara Cook | 5 ft 10 in (1.78 m) | So | King's Christian Collegiate | St. Catharines, ON |
| F | 23 | Chidinma Okafor | 6 ft 4 in (1.93 m) | Jr | USC Aiken | Santa Clarita, CA |
| G | 25 | Ella Meabon | 5 ft 8 in (1.73 m) | Fr | Fairport High School | Fairport, NY |
| F/C | 35 | Maryan Eniafe | 6 ft 2 in (1.88 m) | Fr | Maret School | Upper Marlboro, MD |
| G/F | 41 | Abbey Ferguson | 5 ft 11 in (1.8 m) | So | Holmdel High School | Holmdel, NJ |
| F | 44 | Grace Klag | 6 ft 2 in (1.88 m) | So | Bucknell | Westfield, NJ |

Head coach

- Ganiyat Adeduntan (Florida State)

Assistant coach(es)

- Jason Asbell (Thomas Edison State)
- Macey Hollenshead (Fairfield)
- Ethan Kenney (Michigan)
- Jasmine Whitney (George Washington)

Legend

- (C) Team captain
- (S) Suspended
- (I) Ineligible
- (W) Walk-on
- Injured
- Current redshirt

Roster
Last update: March 24, 2024

== Schedule and results ==
| Date time, TV | Rank^{#} | Opponent^{#} | Result | Record | Site (attendance) city, state |
Non-conference regular season
| November 7, 2023*; 7:00 p.m., ESPN+ | | Cornell | W 71–60 | 1–0 | Cotterell Court (353); Hamilton, NY |
| November 11, 2023*; 1:00 p.m., ESPN+ | | at UMBC | W 57–51 | 2–0 | Chesapeake Employers Insurance Arena (482); Catonsville, MD |
| November 16, 2023*; 7:00 p.m., ESPN+ | | Canisius | W 61–55 ^{OT} | 3–0 | Cotterell Court (262); Hamilton, NY |
| November 24, 2023*; 4:00 p.m., ACCNX | | at Miami (FL); Miami Thanksgiving Tournament | L 49–67 | 3–1 | Watsco Center (2,169); Coral Gables, FL |
| November 26, 2023*; 11:00 a.m. | | vs. Norfolk State; Miami Thanksgiving Tournament | L 51–58 | 3–2 | Watsco Center (–); Coral Gables, FL |
| November 29, 2023*; 6:00 p.m., ESPN+ | | Keuka | W 97–22 | 4–2 | Cotterell Court (333); Hamilton, NY |
| December 5, 2023*; 6:00 p.m., ESPN+ | | Georgetown | L 40–61 | 4–3 | Cotterell Court (181); Hamilton, NY |
| December 8, 2023*; 6:00 p.m., ESPN+ | | Le Moyne | W 65–57 | 5–3 | Cotterell Court (210); Hamilton, NY |
| December 18, 2023*; 11:00 a.m., NEC Front Row | | at Central Connecticut | L 54–69 | 5–4 | William H. Detrick Gymnasium (1,511); New Britain, CT |
| December 21, 2023*; 1:00 p.m., ESPN+ | | St. Bonaventure | W 58–45 | 6–4 | Cotterell Court (226); Hamilton, NY |
| December 29, 2023*; 2:00 p.m., ESPN+ | | at UMass Lowell | W 65–45 | 7–4 | Costello Athletic Center (177); Lowell, MA |
Patriot League regular season
| January 3, 2024; 7:00 p.m., ESPN+ | | at Loyola (MD) | W 73–65 | 8–4 (1–0) | Reitz Arena (148); Baltimore, MD |
| January 6, 2024; 2:00 p.m., ESPN+ | | Navy | W 73–56 | 9–4 (2–0) | Cotterell Court (–); Hamilton, NY |
| January 10, 2024; 11:00 a.m., ESPN+ | | at Lafayette | W 58–46 | 10–4 (3–0) | Kirby Sports Center (1,836); Easton, PA |
| January 13, 2024; 2:00 p.m., ESPN+ | | Bucknell | W 71–46 | 11–4 (4–0) | Cotterell Court (206); Hamilton, NY |
| January 17, 2024; 11:00 a.m., ESPN+ | | Army | L 49–52 | 11–5 (4–1) | Cotterell Court (1,173); Hamilton, NY |
| January 20, 2024; 2:00 p.m., ESPN+ | | at Boston University | L 66–73 | 11–6 (4–2) | Case Gym (496); Boston, MA |
| January 22, 2024; 4:00 p.m., CBSSN | | Lehigh | L 61–79 | 11–7 (4–3) | Cotterell Court (243); Hamilton, NY |
| January 27, 2024; 2:00 p.m., ESPN+ | | American | L 54–56 | 11–8 (4–4) | Cotterell Court (244); Hamilton, NY |
| January 31, 2024; 11:00 a.m., ESPN+ | | at Army | L 52–55 | 11–9 (4–5) | Christl Arena (2,979); West Point, NY |
| February 3, 2024; 4:00 p.m., ESPN+ | | at Navy | L 58–59 | 11–10 (4–6) | Alumni Hall (815); Annapolis, MD |
| February 10, 2024; 2:00 p.m., ESPN+ | | Loyola (MD) | L 61–64 | 11–11 (4–7) | Cotterell Court (443); Hamilton, NY |
| February 14, 2024; 7:00 p.m., ESPN+ | | at Holy Cross | W 60–43 | 12–11 (5–7) | Hart Center (462); Worcester, MA |
| February 17, 2024; 6:00 p.m., ESPN+ | | at Bucknell | W 59–55 | 13–11 (6–7) | Sojka Pavilion (391); Lewisburg, PA |
| February 21, 2024; 6:00 p.m., ESPN+ | | Lafayette | W 75–49 | 14–11 (7–7) | Cotterell Court (249); Hamilton, NY |
| February 24, 2024; 4:00 p.m., ESPN+ | | at American | W 72–60 | 15–11 (8–7) | Bender Arena (665); Washington, D.C. |
| February 28, 2024; 6:00 p.m., ESPN+ | | Holy Cross | W 86–79 | 16–11 (9–7) | Cotterell Court (214); Hamilton, NY |
| March 2, 2024; 4:30 p.m., ESPN+ | | at Lehigh | L 47–55 | 16–12 (9–8) | Stabler Arena (619); Bethlehem, PA |
| March 6, 2024; 6:00 p.m., ESPN+ | | Boston University | W 77–40 | 17–12 (10–8) | Cotterell Court (355); Hamilton, NY |
Patriot League tournament
| March 11, 2024; 6:00 p.m., ESPN+ | (2) | (7) Navy; Quarterfinals | W 69–64 | 18–12 | Cotterell Court (553); Hamilton, NY |
| March 14, 2024; 6:00 p.m., ESPN+ | (2) | (3) Boston University; Semifinals | L 40–52 | 18–13 | Cotterell Court (428); Hamilton, NY |
WNIT
| March 21, 2024*; 6:00 p.m., ESPN+ | | Albany; First round | W 64–50 | 19–13 | Cotterell Court (273); Hamilton, NY |
| March 25, 2024*; 7:00 p.m., FloHoops | | at Providence; Second round | W 54–41 | 20–13 | Alumni Hall (476); Providence, RI |
| March 29, 2024*; 6:00 p.m., ESPN+ | | at Vermont; Super 16 | L 55–65 | 20–14 | Patrick Gym (1,232); Burlington, VT |
*Non-conference game. ^{#}Rankings from AP poll. (#) Tournament seedings in parentheses. All times are in Eastern.
