= 2023–24 Lafayette Leopards women's basketball team =

American college basketball season

2023–24 Lafayette Leopards women's basketball
- Conference: Patriot League
- Record: 10–20 (5–13 Patriot)
- Head coach: Kia Damon-Olson (7th season)
- Assistant coaches: Tom Lochner; Jacinda Dunbar; John Hannafin
- Home arena: Kirby Sports Center

2023–24 Patriot League women's basketball standings
| | Conf. | | | | Overall |
| Team | W | | L | PCT | W | | L | PCT |
|---|---|---|---|---|---|---|---|---|
| Holy Cross † | 11 | – | 7 | .611 | 21 | – | 13 | .618 |
| Colgate | 10 | – | 8 | .556 | 20 | – | 14 | .588 |
| Boston University | 10 | – | 8 | .556 | 20 | – | 12 | .625 |
| Loyola | 10 | – | 8 | .556 | 16 | – | 15 | .516 |
| Lehigh | 9 | – | 9 | .500 | 17 | – | 13 | .567 |
| Army | 9 | – | 9 | .500 | 12 | – | 17 | .414 |
| Navy | 9 | – | 9 | .500 | 14 | – | 17 | .452 |
| Bucknell | 9 | – | 9 | .500 | 13 | – | 18 | .419 |
| American | 8 | – | 10 | .444 | 10 | – | 20 | .333 |
| Lafayette | 5 | – | 13 | .278 | 10 | – | 20 | .333 |
† 2024 Patriot League tournament winner

The 2023–24 Lafayette Leopards women's basketball team represented Lafayette College during the 2023–24 NCAA Division I women's basketball season. The Leopards, who were led by seventh-year head coach Kia Damon-Olson, played their home games at the Kirby Sports Center located in Easton, Pennsylvania, as members of the Patriot League.

== Previous season ==
The Leopards finished the 2022–23 season 10–19, 7–11 in Patriot League play to finish in a tie for seventh place. They were defeated by Loyola (MD) in the first round of the Patriot League tournament.

== Roster ==
2023–24 Lafayette Leopards women's basketball team
Players
Coaches

| Pos. | # | Name | Height | Year | Previous school | Hometown |
|---|---|---|---|---|---|---|
| G | 1 | Abby Antognoli | 5 ft 7 in (1.7 m) | Jr | St. Rose High School | Bay Head, New Jersey |
| F | 2 | Emma Shields | 6 ft 3 in (1.91 m) | So | Emma Willard School | Troy, New York |
| G | 4 | Kylie Favours | 5 ft 9 in (1.75 m) | Jr | Rutgers Prep | Old Bridge, New Jersey |
| F | 10 | Tasha Chudy | 6 ft 2 in (1.88 m) | Fr | Saratoga Springs High School | Saratoga Springs, New York |
| G | 11 | Grace Montgomery | 5 ft 9 in (1.75 m) | Fr | Toorak College | Melbourne, Australia |
| G | 12 | Teresa Kiewiet | 5 ft 10 in (1.78 m) | Fr | Mankato West High School | North Mankato, Minnesota |
| F | 14 | Kayla Drummond | 6 ft 2 in (1.88 m) | Sr | Crestwood Prep | Ontario, Canada |
| G | 15 | Kay Donahue | 5 ft 10 in (1.78 m) | So | Montgomery High School | Belle Mead, New Jersey |
| C | 22 | Aniya Matthews | 6 ft 3 in (1.91 m) | Sr | Temple | York, Pennsylvania |
| G | 23 | Makayla Andrews | 5 ft 10 in (1.78 m) | Sr | St. Rose High School | Neptune, New Jersey |
| G | 24 | Sauda Ntaconayigize | 5 ft 11 in (1.8 m) | So | Champlain College | Quebec, Canada |
| G | 32 | Halee Smith | 5 ft 10 in (1.78 m) | Jr | Quinnipiac | Alexandria, Pennsylvania |
| F | 44 | Brynn Beffert | 6 ft 1 in (1.85 m) | Fr | Hutchinson High School | Hutchinson, Minnesota |

Head coach

- Kia Damon-Olson (Millersville)

Assistant coach(es)

- Tom Lochner (Temple)
- Jacinda Dunbar (Quinnipiac)
- John Hannafin (Springfield)

Legend

- (C) Team captain
- (S) Suspended
- (I) Ineligible
- (W) Walk-on
- Injured
- Current redshirt

Roster
Last update: April 19, 2024

== Schedule and results ==
| Date time, TV | Rank^{#} | Opponent^{#} | Result | Record | Site (attendance) city, state |
Non-conference regular season
| November 7, 2023*; 7:00 pm, ACCNX | | at Syracuse | L 41–75 | 0–1 | JMA Wireless Dome (1,162); Syracuse, NY |
| November 11, 2023*; 12:00 pm, ESPN+ | | at East Tennessee State | L 43–51 | 0–2 | Brooks Gymnasium (527); Johnson City, TN |
| November 15, 2023*; 6:00 pm, ESPN+ | | Marist | L 76–84 ^{OT} | 0–3 | Kirby Sports Center (284); Easton, PA |
| November 18, 2023*; 2:00 pm, NEC Front Row | | at LIU | W 54–51 | 1–3 | Steinberg Wellness Center (175); Brooklyn, NY |
| November 21, 2023*; 6:00 pm, ESPN+ | | NJIT | W 83–60 | 2–3 | Kirby Sports Center (209); Easton, PA |
| November 26, 2023*; 2:00 pm, NEC Front Row | | at Saint Francis | W 60–58 | 3–3 | DeGol Arena (212); Loretto, PA |
| November 29, 2023*; 7:00 pm, ESPN+ | | at UMBC | W 59–53 | 4–3 | Chesapeake Employers Insurance Arena (312); Catonsville, MD |
| December 1, 2023*; 7:00 pm, B1G+ | | at Rutgers | L 48–69 | 4–4 | Jersey Mike's Arena (1,497); Piscataway, NJ |
| December 6, 2023*; 7:00 pm, ACCNX | | at No. 14 Notre Dame | L 42–96 | 4–5 | Purcell Pavilion (4,745); Notre Dame, IN |
| December 11, 2023*; 6:00 pm, ESPN+ | | Monmouth | L 47–68 | 4–6 | Kirby Sports Center (432); Easton, PA |
| December 21, 2023*; 11:00 am, ESPN+ | | at Dartmouth | W 57–55 | 5–6 | Leede Arena (951); Hanover, NH |
Patriot League regular season
| January 3, 2024; 6:00 pm, ESPN+ | | at Army | W 68–42 | 6–6 (1–0) | Christl Arena (237); West Point, NY |
| January 6, 2024; 2:00 pm, ESPN+ | | Boston University | L 55–62 | 6–7 (1–1) | Kirby Sports Center (253); Easton, PA |
| January 10, 2024; 11:00 am, ESPN+ | | Colgate | L 46–58 | 6–8 (1–2) | Kirby Sports Center (1,836); Easton, PA |
| January 13, 2024; 1:00 pm, ESPN+ | | at Navy | L 47–56 | 6–9 (1–3) | Alumni Hall (622); Annapolis, MD |
| January 17, 2024; 6:00 pm, ESPN+ | | Holy Cross | L 57–80 | 6–10 (1–4) | Kirby Sports Center (432); Easton, PA |
| January 20, 2024; 2:00 pm, ESPN+ | | at Bucknell | L 58–65 | 6–11 (1–5) | Sojka Pavilion (437); Lewisburg, PA |
| January 24, 2024; 6:00 pm, ESPN+ | | Loyola (MD) | L 60–67 | 6–12 (1–6) | Kirby Sports Center (274); Easton, PA |
| January 27, 2024; 2:00 pm, ESPN+ | | at Boston University | L 39–51 | 6–13 (1–7) | Case Gym (570); Boston, MA |
| January 31, 2024; 7:00 pm, ESPN+ | | at American | W 60–55 | 7–13 (2–7) | Bender Arena (391); Washington, D.C. |
| February 3, 2024; 2:00 pm, ESPN+ | | Army | W 68–54 | 8–13 (3–7) | Kirby Sports Center (583); Easton, PA |
| February 10, 2024; 2:00 pm, ESPN+ | | Lehigh | L 68–70 ^{OT} | 8–14 (3–8) | Kirby Sports Center (647); Easton, PA |
| February 14, 2024; 7:00 pm, ESPN+ | | at Loyola (MD) | L 51–76 | 8–15 (3–9) | Reitz Arena (133); Baltimore, MD |
| February 17, 2024; 2:00 pm, ESPN+ | | American | W 64–57 | 9–15 (4–9) | Kirby Sports Center (367); Easton, PA |
| February 21, 2024; 6:00 pm, ESPN+ | | at Colgate | L 49–75 | 9–16 (4–10) | Cotterell Court (249); Hamilton, NY |
| February 24, 2024; 7:30 pm, ESPN+ | | at Lehigh | W 68–63 | 10–16 (5–10) | Stabler Arena (766); Bethlehem, PA |
| February 28, 2024; 6:00 pm, ESPN+ | | Navy | L 49–58 | 10–17 (5–11) | Kirby Sports Center (189); Easton, PA |
| March 2, 2024; 2:00 pm, ESPN+ | | Bucknell | L 45–56 | 10–18 (5–12) | Kirby Sports Center (337); Easton, PA |
| March 6, 2024; 7:00 pm, ESPN+ | | at Holy Cross | L 69–77 | 10–19 (5–13) | Hart Center (305); Worcester, MA |
Patriot League tournament
| March 9, 2024; 1:00 pm, ESPN+ | (10) | at (7) Navy; First round | L 45–67 | 10–20 | Alumni Hall (263); Annapolis, MD |
*Non-conference game. ^{#}Rankings from AP Poll. (#) Tournament seedings in parentheses. All times are in Eastern.
