= 2023–24 Holy Cross Crusaders women's basketball team =

American college basketball season

2023–24 Holy Cross Crusaders women's basketball

Patriot League regular-season and tournament champions

NCAA tournament, first round
- Conference: Patriot League
- Record: 21–13 (11–7 Patriot)
- Head coach: Maureen Magarity (4th season)
- Assistant coaches: Candice Green; Kat Fogarty; Paige Corkins
- Home arena: Hart Center

2023–24 Patriot League women's basketball standings
	Conf.				Overall
Team	W		L	PCT	W		L	PCT
Holy Cross †	11	–	7	.611	21	–	13	.618
Colgate	10	–	8	.556	20	–	14	.588
Boston University	10	–	8	.556	20	–	12	.625
Loyola	10	–	8	.556	16	–	15	.516
Lehigh	9	–	9	.500	17	–	13	.567
Army	9	–	9	.500	12	–	17	.414
Navy	9	–	9	.500	14	–	17	.452
Bucknell	9	–	9	.500	13	–	18	.419
American	8	–	10	.444	10	–	20	.333
Lafayette	5	–	13	.278	10	–	20	.333
† 2024 Patriot League tournament winner

The 2023–24 Holy Cross Crusaders women's basketball team represented the College of the Holy Cross during the 2023–24 NCAA Division I women's basketball season. The Crusaders, led by fourth-year head coach Maureen Magarity, played their home games at the Hart Center in Worcester, Massachusetts and were members of the Patriot League. They finished the season 21–13, 11–7 in Patriot League play, to finish in first place.

== Previous season ==
The Crusaders finished the 2022–23 season 24–8, 13–5 in Patriot League play, to finish in second place. As a No. 2 seed in the Patriot women's tournament, they defeated American in the quarterfinals, Lehigh in the semifinals and Boston University in the championship game. They received an automatic bid to the NCAA women's tournament, where they lost in the first round to Maryland.

== Roster ==
2023–24 Holy Cross Crusaders women's basketball team
Players
Coaches

Pos.	#	Name	Height	Year	Previous school	Hometown
F	0	Callie Wright	6 ft 1 in (1.85 m)	Sr	Bill Crothers Secondary; Memphis	Markham, ON
F	4	Meg Cahalan	6 ft 2 in (1.88 m)	So	St. John Vianney	Middletown, NJ
G	5	Kaitlyn Flanagan	5 ft 8 in (1.73 m)	So	Plymouth Whitemarsh	Plymouth Meeting, PA
F	10	Janelle Allen	5 ft 11 in (1.8 m)	Sr	Marian Central Catholic	Lake in the Hills, IL
G	13	Bronagh Power-Cassidy	5 ft 10 in (1.78 m)	Sr	Marianapolis Prep	Dublin, Ireland
G	15	Cara McCormack	5 ft 3 in (1.6 m)	Sr	St. John the Baptist DHS	Smithtown, NY
G	21	Janie Bachmann	6 ft 0 in (1.83 m)	Fr	St. John Vianney	Holmdel, NJ
F	22	Simone Lewis	6 ft 0 in (1.83 m)	Fr	Georgetown Visitation Prep	Lanham, MD
G	23	Grace Munt	5 ft 11 in (1.8 m)	Jr	Rumson-Fair Haven Regional	Fair Haven, NJ
G	24	Simone Fortman	5 ft 9 in (1.75 m)	So	St. Andrew's Episcopal	Odenton, MD
G	25	Hannah Griffin	5 ft 6 in (1.68 m)	Fr	Gwynedd Mercy Academy	Conshohocken, PA
G	33	Mary-Elizabeth Donnelly	6 ft 0 in (1.83 m)	So	Manasquan	Manasquan, NJ
G	34	Lauren Huber	5 ft 10 in (1.78 m)	Jr	Libertyville	Libertyville, IL
F	35	Lindsay Berger	6 ft 2 in (1.88 m)	Jr	Parkland	Orefield, PA

Head coach

- Maureen Magarity (Marist)

Assistant coach(es)

- Candice Green (Colgate)
- Kat Fogarty (New Hampshire)
- Paige Corkins (Concordia College)

Legend

- (C) Team captain
- (S) Suspended
- (I) Ineligible
- (W) Walk-on
- Injured
- Current redshirt

Roster
Last update: October 3, 2024

== Schedule and results ==
Date time, TV	Rank^{#}	Opponent^{#}	Result	Record	Site (attendance) city, state
Non-conference regular season
November 6, 2023*; 5:00 p.m., ACCNX		at Boston College	L 61–66	0–1	Conte Forum (537); Chestnut Hill, MA
November 9, 2023*; 7:00 p.m., ESPN+		Brown	W 62–54	1–1	Hart Center (617); Worcester, MA
November 13, 2023*; 7:00 p.m., ESPN+		UMass Lowell	W 61–51	2–1	Hart Center (461); Worcester, MA
November 19, 2023*; 1:00 p.m., FloHoops		at Stony Brook	L 55–68	2–2	Island Federal Arena (836); Stony Brook, NY
November 21, 2023*; 7:00 p.m., FloHoops		at Villanova	L 53–63	2–3	Finneran Pavilion (1,385); Villanova, PA
November 29, 2023*; 7:30 p.m., NEC Front Row		at Stonehill	W 59–32	3–3	Merkert Gymnasium (127); Easton, MA
December 3, 2023*; 12:00 p.m., ESPN+		at Vermont	L 44–46	3–4	Patrick Gym (740); Burlington, VT
December 7, 2023*; 6:00 p.m., ESPN+		Connecticut College	W 80–39	4–4	Hart Center (490); Worcester, MA
December 10, 2023*; 6:00 p.m., ESPN+		at Quinnipiac	L 63–66	4–5	M&T Bank Arena (587); Hamden, CT
December 17, 2023*; 2:00 p.m., ESPN+		Northeastern	W 65–41	5–5	Hart Center (393); Worcester, MA
December 20, 2023*; 10:30 a.m., ESPN+		Merrimack	W 55–43	6–5	Hart Center (3,316); Worcester, MA
Patriot League regular season
January 3, 2024; 7:00 p.m., ESPN+		Bucknell	W 69–54	7–5 (1–0)	Hart Center (302); Worcester, MA
January 6, 2024; 2:00 p.m., ESPN+		Army	W 67–52	8–5 (2–0)	Hart Center (579); Worcester, MA
January 10, 2024; 5:30 p.m., ESPN+		at Navy	W 69–54	9–5 (3–0)	Alumni Hall (742); Annapolis, MD
January 13, 2024; 2:00 p.m., ESPN+		Lehigh	W 75–54	10–5 (4–0)	Hart Center (693); Worcester, MA
January 17, 2024; 6:00 p.m., ESPN+		at Lafayette	W 80–57	11–5 (5–0)	Kirby Sports Center (432); Easton, PA
January 20, 2024; 3:00 p.m., ESPN+		at Loyola (MD)	W 71–51	12–5 (6–0)	Reitz Arena (363); Baltimore, MD
January 24, 2024; 7:00 p.m., ESPN+		American	W 59–48	13–5 (7–0)	Hart Center (984); Worcester, MA
January 27, 2024; 2:00 p.m., ESPN+		at Lehigh	L 60–70	13–6 (7–1)	Stabler Arena (734); Bethlehem, PA
January 29, 2024; 4:00 p.m., CBSSN		Boston University; Rivalry	W 61–50	14–6 (8–1)	Hart Center (1,213); Worcester, MA
February 3, 2024; 2:00 p.m., ESPN+/NBCSB		Loyola (MD)	L 47–60	14–7 (8–2)	Hart Center (1,091); Worcester, MA
February 10, 2024; 3:00 p.m., ESPN+		at American	L 68–74	14–8 (8–3)	Bender Arena (594); Washington, D.C.
February 14, 2024; 7:00 p.m., ESPN+		Colgate	L 43–60	14–9 (8–4)	Hart Center (462); Worcester, MA
February 17, 2024; 1:00 p.m., ESPN+		at Army	L 43–58	14–10 (8–5)	Christl Arena (787); West Point, NY
February 21, 2024; 6:00 p.m., ESPN+		at Bucknell	W 58–47 ^{OT}	15–10 (9–5)	Sojka Pavilion (316); Lewisburg, PA
February 24, 2024; 12:00 p.m., ESPN+		Navy	W 71–63	16–10 (10–5)	Hart Center (1,152); Worcester, MA
February 28, 2024; 6:00 p.m., ESPN+		at Colgate	L 79–86	16–11 (10–6)	Cotterell Court (214); Hamilton, NY
March 2, 2024; 3:00 p.m., ESPN+		at Boston University; Rivalry	L 63–66	16–12 (10–7)	Case Gym (1,390); Boston, MA
March 6, 2024; 7:00 p.m., ESPN+		Lafayette	W 77–69	17–12 (11–7)	Hart Center (305); Worcester, MA
Patriot League tournament
March 9, 2024; 7:00 p.m., ESPN+	(1)	(8) Bucknell; Quarterfinals	W 61–56	18–12	Hart Center (435); Worcester, MA
March 14, 2024; 7:00 p.m., ESPN+	(1)	(4) Loyola (MD); Semifinals	W 72–54	19–12	Hart Center (754); Worcester, MA
March 17, 2024; 12:00 p.m., CBSSN	(1)	(3) Boston University; Championship/Rivalry	W 61–55	20–12	Hart Center (1,705); Worcester, MA
NCAA tournament
March 21, 2024*; 9:00 p.m., ESPN2	(16 A2)	vs. (16 A2) UT Martin; First Four	W 72–45	21–12	Carver–Hawkeye Arena (1,092); Iowa City, IA
March 23, 2024*; 3:00 p.m., ABC	(16 A2)	at (1 A2) No. 2 Iowa; First round	L 65–91	21–13	Carver–Hawkeye Arena (14,324); Iowa City, IA
*Non-conference game. ^{#}Rankings from AP poll. (#) Tournament seedings in parentheses. A2=Albany 2. All times are in Eastern.

== See also ==
- 2023–24 Holy Cross Crusaders men's basketball team
