= 2023–24 Bucknell Bison women's basketball team =

American college basketball season

2023–24 Bucknell Bison women's basketball
- Conference: Patriot League
- Record: 13–18 (9–9 Patriot)
- Head coach: Trevor Woodruff (5th season)
- Assistant coaches: Sherill Baker; Taylor Coleman; LaSashia Connelly
- Home arena: Sojka Pavilion

2023–24 Patriot League women's basketball standings
	Conf.				Overall
Team	W		L	PCT	W		L	PCT
Holy Cross †	11	–	7	.611	21	–	13	.618
Colgate	10	–	8	.556	20	–	14	.588
Boston University	10	–	8	.556	20	–	12	.625
Loyola	10	–	8	.556	16	–	15	.516
Lehigh	9	–	9	.500	17	–	13	.567
Army	9	–	9	.500	12	–	17	.414
Navy	9	–	9	.500	14	–	17	.452
Bucknell	9	–	9	.500	13	–	18	.419
American	8	–	10	.444	10	–	20	.333
Lafayette	5	–	13	.278	10	–	20	.333
† 2024 Patriot League tournament winner

The 2023–24 Bucknell Bison women's basketball team represented Bucknell University during the 2023–24 NCAA Division I women's basketball season. The Bison, who were led by fifth-year head coach Trevor Woodruff, played their home games at Sojka Pavilion in Lewisburg, Pennsylvania as members of the Patriot League.

== Previous season ==
The Bison finished the 2022–23 season 13–17, 9–9 in Patriot League play, to finish in sixth place. They were defeated by Lehigh in the quarterfinals of the Patriot League tournament.

== Roster ==
2023–24 Bucknell Bison women's basketball team
Players
Coaches

Pos.	#	Name	Height	Year	Previous school	Hometown
G/F	0	Emma Theodorsson	6 ft 1 in (1.85 m)	So	Moon Area High School	Moon Township, PA
G	1	Ashley O'Connor	5 ft 9 in (1.75 m)	So	St. John Vianney High School	Sea Bright, NJ
G	2	Rosie Scognamiglio	5 ft 10 in (1.78 m)	Fr	St. Rose High School	Bradley Beach, NJ
G	4	Caroline Dingler	5 ft 9 in (1.75 m)	Sr	Darlington School	Rome, GA
G/F	10	Isabella King	6 ft 0 in (1.83 m)	Jr	Bedford High School	Bedford, NH
PG	11	Blake Matthews	5 ft 4 in (1.63 m)	So	Atascocita High School	Houston, TX
F	12	Ashley Sofilkanich	6 ft 3 in (1.91 m)	Fr	St. John Vianney High School	South Amboy, NJ
F	13	Grace Sullivan	6 ft 4 in (1.93 m)	So	Carmel Catholic High School	Antioch, IL
F	20	Kaylee Reinbeau	6 ft 0 in (1.83 m)	Sr	Wheeling Central Catholic High School	Wheeling, WV
G	22	Sophia Sabino	5 ft 9 in (1.75 m)	RS So	Fordham	Rumson, NJ
F	31	Nicole Davis	6 ft 4 in (1.93 m)	Sr	Monacan High School	Richmond, VA
G	33	Julie Kulesza	5 ft 9 in (1.75 m)	Sr	Conrad Schools of Science	Wilmington, DE

Head coach

- Trevor Woodruff (Misericordia)

Assistant coach(es)

- Sherill Baker (Georgia)
- Taylor Coleman (DeSales)
- LaSashia Connelly (Salem College)

Legend

- (C) Team captain
- (S) Suspended
- (I) Ineligible
- (W) Walk-on
- Injured
- Current redshirt

Roster
Last update: April 16, 2024

== Schedule and results ==
Date time, TV	Rank^{#}	Opponent^{#}	Result	Record	Site (attendance) city, state
Non-conference regular season
November 7, 2023*; 6:00 p.m., B1G+		at Penn State	L 51–94	0–1	Bryce Jordan Center (1,977); University Park, PA
November 11, 2023*; 7:00 p.m., ESPN+		at Temple	L 53–77	0–2	Liacouras Center (1,101); Philadelphia, PA
November 15, 2023*; 11:00 a.m., ESPN+		Fairleigh Dickinson	W 49–44	1–2	Sojka Pavilion (1,267); Lewisburg, PA
November 19, 2023*; 4:00 p.m., ACCN		at No. 19 Louisville	L 44–77	1–3	KFC Yum! Center (7,383); Louisville, KY
November 21, 2023*; 12:00 p.m., ESPN+		at Western Kentucky	L 45–63	1–4	E. A. Diddle Arena (2,214); Bowling Green, KY
November 24, 2023*; 2:00 p.m., ESPN+		Robert Morris	W 68–54	2–4	Sojka Pavilion (310); Lewisburg, PA
November 28, 2023*; 6:00 p.m., ESPN+		Saint Joseph's	L 46–71	2–5	Sojka Pavilion (287); Lewisburg, PA
December 2, 2023*; 2:00 p.m., ESPN+		Cornell	L 53–58	2–6	Sojka Pavilion (319); Lewisburg, PA
December 5, 2023*; 7:00 p.m., ESPN+		at Mount St. Mary's	L 46–55	2–7	Knott Arena (544); Emmitsburg, MD
December 17, 2023*; 2:00 p.m., ESPN+		Merrimack	W 64–44	3–7	Sojka Pavilion (286); Lewisburg, PA
December 21, 2023*; 1:00 p.m., FloHoops		at Marquette	L 39–67	3–8	Al McGuire Center (2,240); Milwaukee, WI
Patriot League regular season
January 3, 2024; 7:00 p.m., ESPN+		at Holy Cross	L 54–69	3–9 (0–1)	Hart Center (302); Worcester, MA
January 6, 2024; 2:00 p.m., ESPN+		at American	L 47–58	3–10 (0–2)	Bender Arena (394); Washington, D.C.
January 10, 2024; 6:00 p.m., ESPN+		Lehigh	L 63–69	3–11 (0–3)	Sojka Pavilion (462); Lewisburg, PA
January 13, 2024; 2:00 p.m., ESPN+		at Colgate	L 46–71	3–12 (0–4)	Cotterell Court (206); Hamilton, NY
January 17, 2024; 6:00 p.m., ESPN+		Boston University	W 61–52	4–12 (1–4)	Sojka Pavilion (223); Lewisburg, PA
January 20, 2024; 2:00 p.m., ESPN+		Lafayette	W 65–58	5–12 (2–4)	Sojka Pavilion (437); Lewisburg, PA
January 24, 2024; 7:00 p.m., ESPN+		at Navy	L 48–59	5–13 (2–5)	Alumni Hall (585); Annapolis, MD
January 27, 2024; 3:30 p.m., ESPN+		Army	L 66–75	5–14 (2–6)	Sojka Pavilion (571); Lewisburg, PA
January 31, 2024; 7:00 p.m., ESPN+		at Loyola (MD)	W 61–59	6–14 (3–6)	Reitz Arena (242); Baltimore, MD
February 4, 2024; 2:00 p.m., ESPN+		American	W 61–47	7–14 (4–6)	Sojka Pavilion (667); Lewisburg, PA
February 10, 2024; 2:00 p.m., ESPN+		at Boston University	W 71–60	8–14 (5–6)	Case Gym (848); Boston, MA
February 14, 2024; 6:00 p.m., ESPN+		at Lehigh	W 54–49	9–14 (6–6)	Stabler Arena (503); Bethlehem, PA
February 17, 2024; 6:00 p.m., ESPN+		Colgate	L 55–59	9–15 (6–7)	Sojka Pavilion (391); Lewisburg, PA
February 21, 2024; 6:00 p.m., ESPN+		Holy Cross	L 47–58 ^{OT}	9–16 (6–8)	Sojka Pavilion (316); Lewisburg, PA
February 24, 2024; 1:00 p.m., ESPN+		at Army	W 65–63	10–16 (7–8)	Christl Arena (611); West Point, NY
February 28, 2024; 6:00 p.m., ESPN+		Loyola (MD)	W 74–56	11–16 (8–8)	Sojka Pavilion (391); Lewisburg, PA
March 2, 2024; 2:00 p.m., ESPN+		at Lafayette	W 56–45	12–16 (9–8)	Kirby Sports Center (337); Easton, PA
March 6, 2024; 6:00 p.m., ESPN+		Navy	L 49–55	12–17 (9–9)	Sojka Pavilion (394); Lewisburg, PA
Patriot League tournament
March 9, 2024; 7:00 p.m., ESPN+	(8)	(9) American; First round	W 77–71	13–17	Sojka Pavilion (419); Lewisburg, PA
March 11, 2024; 7:00 p.m., ESPN+	(8)	at (1) Holy Cross; Quarterfinals	L 56–61	13–18	Hart Center (435); Worcester, MA
*Non-conference game. ^{#}Rankings from AP poll. (#) Tournament seedings in parentheses. All times are in Eastern.
