= 2024 Patriot League women's basketball tournament =

Conference postseason tournament

- Classification: Division I
- Season: 2023–24
- Teams: 10
- Site: Campus sites
- Champions: Holy Cross (13th title)
- Winning coach: Maureen Magarity (2nd title)
- MVP: Bronagh Power-Cassidy (Holy Cross)
- Television: ESPN+, CBSSN

2023–24 Patriot League women's basketball standings
	Conf.				Overall
Team	W		L	PCT	W		L	PCT
Holy Cross †	11	–	7	.611	21	–	13	.618
Colgate	10	–	8	.556	20	–	14	.588
Boston University	10	–	8	.556	20	–	12	.625
Loyola	10	–	8	.556	16	–	15	.516
Lehigh	9	–	9	.500	17	–	13	.567
Army	9	–	9	.500	12	–	17	.414
Navy	9	–	9	.500	14	–	17	.452
Bucknell	9	–	9	.500	13	–	18	.419
American	8	–	10	.444	10	–	20	.333
Lafayette	5	–	13	.278	10	–	20	.333
† 2024 Patriot League tournament winner

The 2024 Patriot League Women's Basketball Tournament was the conference postseason tournament for the Patriot League. The tournament was held March 9–17, 2024 at campus sites of the higher seeds. The winner received the conference's automatic bid to the NCAA Tournament.

== Seeds ==
All ten teams in the conference standings qualified for the tournament. The teams were seeded by record in conference, with a tiebreaker system to seed teams with identical conference records.

The two tiebreakers used by the Patriot League are: 1) head-to-head record of teams with identical record and 2) NCAA NET Rankings available on day following the conclusion of Patriot League regular season play.

Seed	School	Conference	Tiebreaker 1	Tiebreaker 2	Tiebreaker 3
1	Holy Cross	11–7			
2	Colgate	10–8	2–2 vs. Boston University/Loyola	2–0 vs. Holy Cross	
3	Boston University	10–8	2–2 vs. Colgate/Loyola	1–1 vs. Holy Cross	231 NET
4	Loyola (MD)	10–8	2–2 vs. Colgate/Loyola	1–1 vs. Holy Cross	262 NET
5	Lehigh	9–9	4–2 vs. Army/Bucknell/Navy		
6	Army	9–9	3–3 vs. Bucknell/Lehigh/Navy	2–0 vs. Navy	
7	Navy	9–9	3–3 vs. Army/Bucknell/Lehigh	0–2 vs. Army	
8	Bucknell	9–9	2–4 vs. Army/Lehigh/Navy		
9	American	8–10			
10	Lafayette	5–13			

== Schedule ==
Game	Time	Matchup	Score	Television
First round – Saturday, March 9
1	1:00 pm	No. 7 Navy vs. No. 10 Lafayette	67–45	ESPN+
2	7:00 pm	No. 8 Bucknell vs No. 9 American	77–71	ESPN+
Quarterfinals – Monday, March 11
3	7:00 pm	No. 1 Holy Cross vs. No. 8 Bucknell	61–56	ESPN+
4	6:00 pm	No. 2 Colgate vs. No. 7 Navy	69–64	ESPN+
5	6:10 pm	No. 3 Boston University vs. No. 6 Army	64–62	ESPN+
6	7:10 pm	No. 4 Loyola (MD) vs. No. 5 Lehigh	58–51	ESPN+
Semifinals – Thursday, March 14
7	7:00 pm	No. 1 Holy Cross vs. No. 4 Loyola (MD)	72–54	ESPN+
8	6:00 pm	No. 2 Colgate vs. No. 3 Boston University	40–52	ESPN+
Championship – Sunday, March 17
9	Noon	No. 1 Holy Cross vs. No. 3 Boston University	61–55	CBSSN
Game times in ET. Rankings denote tournament seeding. All games hosted by higher-seeded team.

== Bracket ==
First round Saturday, March 9, 2024; ESPN+
8	Bucknell	77
9	American	71
7	Navy	67
10	Lafayette	45

Quarterfinals; Monday, March 11, 2024; ESPN+
1	Holy Cross	61
8	Bucknell	56
4	Loyola (MD)	58
5	Lehigh	51
2	Colgate	69
7	Navy	64
3	Boston University	64
6	Army	62

Semifinals; Thursday, March 14, 2024; ESPN+
1	Holy Cross	72
4	Loyola (MD)	54
2	Colgate	40
3	Boston University	52

Championship; Sunday, March 17, 2024; CBSSN
1	Holy Cross	61
3	Boston University	55
