= 2023–24 Boston University Terriers women's basketball team =

American college basketball season

2023–24 Boston University Terriers women's basketball
- Conference: Patriot League
- Record: 20–12 (10–8 Patriot)
- Head coach: Melissa Graves (3rd season)
- Associate head coach: Brianna Finch
- Assistant coaches: Kourtni Williams; Jamie Insel
- Home arena: Case Gym

2023–24 Patriot League women's basketball standings
| | Conf. | | | | Overall |
| Team | W | | L | PCT | W | | L | PCT |
|---|---|---|---|---|---|---|---|---|
| Holy Cross † | 11 | – | 7 | .611 | 21 | – | 13 | .618 |
| Colgate | 10 | – | 8 | .556 | 20 | – | 14 | .588 |
| Boston University | 10 | – | 8 | .556 | 20 | – | 12 | .625 |
| Loyola | 10 | – | 8 | .556 | 16 | – | 15 | .516 |
| Lehigh | 9 | – | 9 | .500 | 17 | – | 13 | .567 |
| Army | 9 | – | 9 | .500 | 12 | – | 17 | .414 |
| Navy | 9 | – | 9 | .500 | 14 | – | 17 | .452 |
| Bucknell | 9 | – | 9 | .500 | 13 | – | 18 | .419 |
| American | 8 | – | 10 | .444 | 10 | – | 20 | .333 |
| Lafayette | 5 | – | 13 | .278 | 10 | – | 20 | .333 |
† 2024 Patriot League tournament winner

The 2023–24 Boston University Terriers women's basketball team represented Boston University during the 2023–24 NCAA Division I women's basketball season. The Terriers, who were led by third-year head coach Melissa Graves, played their home games at Case Gym in Boston, Massachusetts as members of the Patriot League.

== Previous season ==
The Terriers finished the 2022–23 season 24–8, 17–1 in Patriot League play, to finish as Patriot League regular-season champions. They defeated Loyola (MD) in the quarterfinals of the Patriot League tournament, and Army in the semifinals, before falling to Holy Cross in the championship game. They received an automatic bid into the WNIT, where they were defeated by Rhode Island in the first round.

== Roster ==
2023–24 Boston University Terriers women's basketball team
Players
Coaches

| Pos. | # | Name | Height | Year | Previous school | Hometown |
|---|---|---|---|---|---|---|
| G | 3 | Kelsi Mingo | 5 ft 8 in (1.73 m) | Sr | Boca Raton High School | Boca Raton, FL |
| G | 4 | Natalie Jasper | 5 ft 5 in (1.65 m) | Jr | Georgetown | Pittsburgh, PA |
| G | 5 | Aoibhe Gormley | 5 ft 8 in (1.73 m) | Fr | Thayer Academy | Quincy, MA |
| G | 8 | Aina Grane Torres | 6 ft 0 in (1.83 m) | Fr | Bernat el Ferrer | Molins de Rei, Spain |
| G | 10 | Alex Giannaros | 5 ft 5 in (1.65 m) | Jr | Tabor Academy | Brockton, MA |
| F | 11 | Caitlin Weimar | 6 ft 4 in (1.93 m) | Sr | Hendrick Hudson High School | Cortlandt Manor, NY |
| G | 14 | Inés Monteagudo Pardo | 5 ft 11 in (1.8 m) | Fr | Martí Sorolla II School | Valencia, Spain |
| G | 15 | Emelia O'Gilvie | 5 ft 8 in (1.73 m) | Fr | St. Andrew's School | Hyde Park, MA |
| F | 20 | Anete Adler | 6 ft 5 in (1.96 m) | So | Rhode Island | Keila, Estonia |
| G | 21 | Audrey Ericksen | 6 ft 0 in (1.83 m) | Fr | Green Level High School | Cary, NC |
| F | 24 | Sisi Bentley | 6 ft 0 in (1.83 m) | Fr | Northfield Mount Hermon School | Hartford, CT |
| F | 31 | Anastasiia Semenova | 6 ft 2 in (1.88 m) | So | College of Olympic Reserve No. 1 | Saint Petersburg, Russia |
| G | 40 | Sophie Beneventine | 5 ft 8 in (1.73 m) | Sr | Ridge High School | Basking Ridge, NJ |

Head coach

- Melissa Graves (Notre Dame)

Assistant coach(es)

- Brianna Finch (Sonoma State)
- Kourtni Williams (Mid-America Christian)
- Jamie Insel (Assumption)

Legend

- (C) Team captain
- (S) Suspended
- (I) Ineligible
- (W) Walk-on
- Injured
- Current redshirt

Roster
Last update: March 24, 2024

== Schedule and results ==
| Date time, TV | Rank^{#} | Opponent^{#} | Result | Record | Site (attendance) city, state |
Non-conference regular season
| November 6, 2023*; 6:00 p.m., ESPN+ | | UMass Lowell | W 60–58 | 1–0 | Case Gym (841); Boston, MA |
| November 10, 2023*; 5:00 p.m., ESPN+ | | New Hampshire | W 56–47 | 2–0 | Case Gym (510); Boston, MA |
| November 14, 2023*; 6:00 p.m., ESPN+ | | Yale | W 60–53 | 3–0 | Case Gym (605); Boston, MA |
| November 18, 2023*; 2:00 p.m., ESPN+ | | at Rider | L 55–58 | 3–1 | Alumni Gymnasium (686); Lawrenceville, NJ |
| November 22, 2023*; 1:00 p.m., ESPN+ | | Le Moyne | W 64–53 | 4–1 | Case Gym (361); Boston, MA |
| November 26, 2023*; 4:00 p.m., ESPN+ | | at Northern Colorado | W 63–52 | 5–1 | Bank of Colorado Arena (506); Greeley, CO |
| November 28, 2023*; 8:00 p.m. | | at No. 7 Colorado | L 55–85 | 5–2 | CU Events Center (2,743); Boulder, CO |
| December 5, 2023*; 6:00 p.m., ESPN+ | | Saint Joseph's | L 47–62 | 5–3 | Case Gym (171); Boston, MA |
| December 9, 2023*; 7:00 p.m., NESN/ESPN+ | | Harvard | W 80–77 | 6–3 | Case Gym (893); Boston, MA |
| December 12, 2023*; 6:00 p.m., ESPN+ | | Emmanuel | W 80–47 | 7–3 | Case Gym (360); Boston, MA |
| December 22, 2023*; 12:00 p.m., NESN/FloHoops | | at Northeastern | W 83–80 ^{OT} | 8–3 | Cabot Center (352); Boston, MA |
Patriot League regular season
| January 3, 2024; 2:00 p.m., ESPN+ | | Navy | W 62–51 | 9–3 (1–0) | Case Gym (270); Boston, MA |
| January 6, 2024; 2:00 p.m., ESPN+ | | at Lafayette | W 62–55 | 10–3 (2–0) | Kirby Sports Center (253); Easton, PA |
| January 10, 2024; 11:30 a.m., ESPN+ | | at American | L 87–91 ^{2OT} | 10–4 (2–1) | Bender Arena (908); Washington, D.C. |
| January 13, 2024; 2:00 p.m., ESPN+ | | Loyola (MD) | W 55–48 | 11–4 (3–1) | Case Gym (456); Boston, MA |
| January 17, 2024; 6:00 p.m., ESPN+ | | at Bucknell | L 52–61 | 11–5 (4–1) | Sojka Pavilion (223); Lewisburg, PA |
| January 20, 2024; 2:00 p.m., ESPN+ | | Colgate | W 73–66 | 12–5 (4–2) | Case Gym (496); Boston, MA |
| January 24, 2024; 6:00 p.m., ESPN+ | | at Army | L 57–61 | 12–6 (4–3) | Christl Arena (321); West Point, NY |
| January 27, 2024; 2:00 p.m., ESPN+ | | Lafayette | W 51–39 | 13–6 (5–3) | Case Gym (570); Boston, MA |
| January 29, 2024; 4:00 p.m., CBSSN | | at Holy Cross; Turnpike Trophy | L 50–61 | 13–7 (5–4) | Hart Center (1,213); Worcester, MA |
| February 3, 2024; 2:00 p.m., ESPN+ | | at Lehigh | L 62–64 | 13–8 (5–5) | Stabler Arena (983); Bethlehem, PA |
| February 10, 2024; 2:00 p.m., ESPN+ | | Bucknell | L 60–71 | 13–9 (5–6) | Case Gym (848); Boston, MA |
| February 14, 2024; 6:00 p.m., ESPN+ | | Army | W 72–64 | 14–9 (6–6) | Case Gym (432); Boston, MA |
| February 17, 2024; 3:30 p.m., ESPN+ | | at Navy | W 69–60 | 15–9 (7–6) | Alumni Hall (678); Annapolis, MD |
| February 21, 2024; 6:00 p.m., ESPN+ | | American | W 58–56 | 16–9 (8–6) | Case Gym (650); Boston, MA |
| February 24, 2024; 5:00 p.m., ESPN+ | | at Loyola (MD) | L 65–70 ^{OT} | 16–10 (8–7) | Reitz Arena (283); Baltimore, MD |
| February 28, 2024; 6:00 p.m., ESPN+ | | Lehigh | W 89–78 | 17–10 (9–7) | Case Gym (685); Boston, MA |
| March 2, 2024; 3:00 p.m., ESPN+ | | Holy Cross; Turnpike Trophy | W 66–63 | 18–10 (10–7) | Case Gym (1,390); Boston, MA |
| March 6, 2024; 6:00 p.m., ESPN+ | | at Colgate | L 40–77 | 18–11 (10–8) | Cotterell Court (355); Hamilton, NY |
Patriot League tournament
| March 11, 2024; 6:10 p.m., ESPN+ | (3) | (6) Army; Quarterfinals | W 64–62 | 19–11 | Case Gym (483); Boston, MA |
| March 14, 2024; 6:00 p.m., ESPN+ | (3) | at (2) Colgate; Semifinals | W 52–40 | 20–11 | Cotterell Court (428); Hamilton, NY |
| March 17, 2024; 12:00 p.m., CBSSN | (3) | at (1) Holy Cross; Championship/Turnpike Trophy | L 55–61 | 20–12 | Hart Center (1,705); Worcester, MA |
*Non-conference game. ^{#}Rankings from AP poll. (#) Tournament seedings in parentheses. All times are in Eastern.
