= 2023–24 Navy Midshipmen women's basketball team =

American college basketball season

2023–24 Navy Midshipmen women's basketball
- Conference: Patriot League
- Record: 14–17 (9–9 Patriot)
- Head coach: Tim Taylor (4th season)
- Associate head coach: Michael Coppolino
- Assistant coaches: Marlena Tremba; Bernadette Devaney; Faith Randolph
- Home arena: Alumni Hall

2023–24 Patriot League women's basketball standings
| | Conf. | | | | Overall |
| Team | W | | L | PCT | W | | L | PCT |
|---|---|---|---|---|---|---|---|---|
| Holy Cross † | 11 | – | 7 | .611 | 21 | – | 13 | .618 |
| Colgate | 10 | – | 8 | .556 | 20 | – | 14 | .588 |
| Boston University | 10 | – | 8 | .556 | 20 | – | 12 | .625 |
| Loyola | 10 | – | 8 | .556 | 16 | – | 15 | .516 |
| Lehigh | 9 | – | 9 | .500 | 17 | – | 13 | .567 |
| Army | 9 | – | 9 | .500 | 12 | – | 17 | .414 |
| Navy | 9 | – | 9 | .500 | 14 | – | 17 | .452 |
| Bucknell | 9 | – | 9 | .500 | 13 | – | 18 | .419 |
| American | 8 | – | 10 | .444 | 10 | – | 20 | .333 |
| Lafayette | 5 | – | 13 | .278 | 10 | – | 20 | .333 |
† 2024 Patriot League tournament winner

The 2023–24 Navy Midshipmen women's basketball team represented the United States Naval Academy during the 2023–24 NCAA Division I women's basketball season. The Midshipmen, who were led by fourth-year head coach Tim Taylor, played their home games at Alumni Hall in Annapolis, Maryland, as members of the Patriot League.

== Previous season ==
The Midshipmen finished the 2022–23 season 1–29, 1–17 in Patriot League play, to finish in last place. They were defeated by American in the first round of the Patriot League tournament.

== Roster ==
2023–24 Navy Midshipmen women's basketball team
Players
Coaches

| Pos. | # | Name | Height | Year | Previous school | Hometown |
|---|---|---|---|---|---|---|
| G | 1 | Kelli Giuliani | 5 ft 7 in (1.7 m) | So | Flint Hill School | Oakton, VA |
| G | 2 | Kyah Smith | 5 ft 9 in (1.75 m) | Fr | L. C. Bird High School | Richmond, VA |
| G/F | 3 | Shannon Clarke | 6 ft 1 in (1.85 m) | So | Lawrence Free State High School | Lawrence, KS |
| G | 4 | Zanai Barnett-Gay | 5 ft 8 in (1.73 m) | Fr | Riverdale Baptist School | Glenn Dale, MD |
| F | 10 | Lizzie Holder | 6 ft 1 in (1.85 m) | Fr | Colorado | Stillwater, MN |
| G | 11 | Sam Schofield | 5 ft 8 in (1.73 m) | Sr | Anthony Wayne High School | Maumee, OH |
| F | 13 | Gia Pissott | 6 ft 3 in (1.91 m) | So | Toms River High School North | Toms River, NJ |
| F | 14 | Morganne Andrews | 6 ft 1 in (1.85 m) | Sr | Martinsburg High School | Martinsburg, WV |
| G | 22 | Toni Papahronis | 6 ft 1 in (1.85 m) | So | Edmond North High School | Edmond, OK |
| F | 23 | Morgan Demos | 6 ft 2 in (1.88 m) | So | Benet Academy | Downers Grove, IL |
| G | 30 | Maren Louridas | 6 ft 0 in (1.83 m) | So | Bethlehem Central High School | Delmar, NY |
| F | 33 | Violet McNece | 6 ft 0 in (1.83 m) | Fr | Marquette | Chesterfield, MO |
| G/F | 34 | Sydne Watts | 6 ft 0 in (1.83 m) | Sr | Cherokee High School | Canton, GA |
| G | 42 | Saran Moschella | 5 ft 10 in (1.78 m) | Fr | Staten Island Academy | Staten Island, NY |
| C | 44 | Kate Samson | 6 ft 4 in (1.93 m) | So | Saint Gertrude High School | Richmond, VA |

Head coach

- Tim Taylor (James Madison)

Assistant coach(es)

- Michael Coppolino (Eckerd)
- Marlena Tremba (William & Mary)
- Bernadette Devaney (Lehigh)
- Faith Randolph (Virginia)

Legend

- (C) Team captain
- (S) Suspended
- (I) Ineligible
- (W) Walk-on
- Injured
- Current redshirt

Roster
Last update: April 15, 2024

== Schedule and results ==
| Date time, TV | Rank^{#} | Opponent^{#} | Result | Record | Site (attendance) city, state |
Non-conference regular season
| November 8, 2023*; 7:00 p.m., ESPN+ | | Susquehanna | W 78–37 | 1–0 | Alumni Hall (351); Annapolis, MD |
| November 10, 2023*; 5:00 p.m., B1G+ | | at Penn State | L 44–107 | 1–1 | Bryce Jordan Center (2,127); University Park, PA |
| November 15, 2023*; 7:00 p.m., ESPN+ | | Mount St. Mary's | L 59–67 ^{OT} | 1–2 | Alumni Hall (302); Annapolis, MD |
| November 21, 2023*; 6:00 p.m., ESPN+ | | Binghamton | W 66–59 | 2–2 | Alumni Hall (329); Annapolis, MD |
| November 25, 2023*; 1:00 p.m., ESPN+ | | Quinnipiac; Navy Classic | W 75–62 | 3–2 | Alumni Hall (384); Annapolis, MD |
| November 26, 2023*; 1:00 p.m., ESPN+ | | Abilene Christian; Navy Classic | L 62–87 | 3–3 | Alumni Hall (288); Annapolis, MD |
| November 30, 2023*; 7:00 p.m., NEC Front Row | | at Wagner | L 67–69 | 3–4 | Spiro Sports Center (430); Staten Island, NY |
| December 3, 2023*; 11:00 a.m., ESPN+ | | William & Mary | L 53–81 | 3–5 | Alumni Hall (950); Annapolis, MD |
| December 8, 2023*; 5:00 p.m., ESPN+ | | at Dartmouth | L 52–65 | 3–6 | Leede Arena (459); Hanover, NH |
| December 19, 2023*; 6:00 p.m., ESPN+ | | Goucher | W 105–50 | 4–6 | Alumni Hall (362); Annapolis, MD |
| December 30, 2023*; 2:00 p.m., ESPN+ | | at Albany | L 56–87 | 4–7 | Broadview Center (1,328); Albany, NY |
Patriot League regular season
| January 3, 2024; 2:00 p.m., ESPN+ | | at Boston University | L 51–62 | 4–8 (0–1) | Case Gym (270); Boston, MA |
| January 6, 2024; 2:00 p.m., ESPN+ | | at Colgate | L 56–73 | 4–9 (0–2) | Cotterell Court (–); Hamilton, NY |
| January 10, 2024; 5:30 p.m., ESPN+ | | Holy Cross | L 54–69 | 4–10 (0–3) | Alumni Hall (742); Annapolis, MD |
| January 13, 2024; 1:00 p.m., ESPN+ | | Lafayette | W 56–47 | 5–10 (1–3) | Alumni Hall (622); Annapolis, MD |
| January 17, 2024; 6:00 p.m., ESPN+ | | at Lehigh | L 65–81 | 5–11 (1–4) | Stabler Arena (448); Bethlehem, PA |
| January 20, 2024; 11:00 a.m., CBSSN | | Army | L 51–66 | 5–12 (1–5) | Alumni Hall (5,255); Annapolis, MD |
| January 24, 2024; 7:00 p.m., ESPN+ | | Bucknell | W 59–48 | 6–12 (2–5) | Alumni Hall (585); Annapolis, MD |
| January 27, 2024; 5:00 p.m., ESPN+ | | at Loyola (MD) | L 67–70 | 6–13 (2–6) | Reitz Arena (279); Baltimore, MD |
| January 31, 2024; 7:00 p.m., ESPN+ | | Lehigh | W 62–46 | 7–13 (3–6) | Alumni Hall (718); Annapolis, MD |
| February 3, 2024; 4:00 p.m., ESPN+ | | Colgate | W 59–58 | 8–13 (4–6) | Alumni Hall (815); Annapolis, MD |
| February 10, 2024; 11:00 a.m., CBSSN | | at Army | L 58–70 | 8–14 (4–7) | Christl Arena (1,000); West Point, NY |
| February 14, 2024; 7:00 p.m., ESPN+ | | at American | W 69–55 | 9–14 (5–7) | Bender Arena (299); Washington, D.C. |
| February 17, 2024; 3:30 p.m., ESPN+ | | Boston University | L 60–69 | 9–15 (5–8) | Alumni Hall (678); Annapolis, MD |
| February 21, 2024; 7:00 p.m., ESPN+ | | Loyola (MD) | W 53–51 | 10–15 (6–8) | Alumni Hall (814); Annapolis, MD |
| February 24, 2024; 12:00 p.m., ESPN+ | | at Holy Cross | L 63–71 | 10–16 (6–9) | Hart Center (1,152); Worcester, MA |
| February 28, 2024; 6:00 p.m., ESPN+ | | at Lafayette | W 58–49 | 11–16 (7–9) | Kirby Sports Center (189); Easton, PA |
| March 2, 2024; 12:00 p.m., ESPN+ | | American | W 73–57 | 12–16 (8–9) | Alumni Hall (1,065); Annapolis, MD |
| March 6, 2024; 6:00 p.m., ESPN+ | | at Bucknell | W 55–49 | 13–16 (9–9) | Sojka Pavilion (394); Lewisburg, PA |
Patriot League tournament
| March 9, 2024; 1:00 p.m., ESPN+ | (7) | (10) Lafayette; First round | W 67–45 | 14–16 | Alumni Hall (263); Annapolis, MD |
| March 11, 2024; 6:00 p.m., ESPN+ | (7) | at (2) Colgate; Quarterfinals | L 64–69 | 14–17 | Cotterell Court (553); Hamilton, NY |
*Non-conference game. ^{#}Rankings from AP poll. (#) Tournament seedings in parentheses. All times are in Eastern.
