= Navy Midshipmen basketball =

Navy Midshipmen basketball may refer to either of the basketball teams that represent the United States Naval Academy:

- Navy Midshipmen men's basketball
- Navy Midshipmen women's basketball
