= Davis Gym =

Indoor athletic facility in Bucknell University

Coordinates: 40.9561°N 76.8880°W

Davis Gymnasium
- Interactive map of Davis Gymnasium
- Location: Moore Avenue; Lewisburg, PA 17837
- Owner: Bucknell University
- Operator: Bucknell University
- Capacity: 2,500 (1938–2003); 1,100 (2003–present)
- Surface: Hardwood Floor

Construction
- Groundbreaking: September, 1937
- Opened: June, 1938

Tenants
- Bucknell Bison women's volleyball (1978–present); Bucknell Bison wrestling (1944–present); Bucknell Bison men's basketball (1938–2003); Bucknell Bison women's basketball (1973–2003)

Davis Gym is an indoor athletics facility on the campus of Bucknell University in Lewisburg, Pennsylvania, United States. It is currently home to Bucknell Bison volleyball and wrestling. It was the primary venue for basketball and other indoor sports until the Sojka Pavilion opened in 2003. It hosted the Patriot League men's basketball tournament title game in 1993. Following renovations in the 1990s to add reserved seats, Davis Gym's listed capacity was 2,500, though on occasion standing room crowds exceeded that.

Davis Gym is named for John Warren Davis, class of 1896 and chairman of the board of trustees at the time of its opening. It was dedicated in his honor in 1938. The gym replaced Tustin Gymnasium (now Tustin Hall), built in 1890. The building, located on the northern edge of campus with the Lewisburg Cemetery behind it, has a barrel vault ceiling, with end zone scoreboards and seating above the sides of the court. Formerly, bleachers were located courtside during its time as a basketball gym, and a stage was located at the rear (northwest) end of the building but has since been blocked off.
