= 2022–23 Holy Cross Crusaders women's basketball team =

American college basketball season

2022–23 Holy Cross Crusaders women's basketball

Patriot League tournament champions

NCAA tournament, first round
- Conference: Patriot League
- Record: 24–8 (13–5 Patriot)
- Head coach: Maureen Magarity (3rd season)
- Assistant coaches: Clare Fitzpatrick; Kat Fogarty; John McCray
- Home arena: Hart Center

2022–23 Patriot League women's basketball standings
	Conf.				Overall
Team	W		L	PCT	W		L	PCT
Boston University	17	–	1	.944	24	–	9	.727
Holy Cross†	13	–	5	.722	24	–	8	.750
Lehigh	12	–	6	.667	17	–	14	.548
Colgate	10	–	8	.556	16	–	14	.533
Army	10	–	8	.556	13	–	17	.433
Bucknell	9	–	9	.500	13	–	17	.433
Lafayette	7	–	11	.389	10	–	19	.345
American	7	–	11	.389	9	–	22	.290
Loyola	4	–	14	.222	10	–	21	.323
Navy	1	–	17	.056	1	–	29	.033
† 2023 Patriot League tournament winner As of March 11, 2023

The 2022–23 Holy Cross Crusaders women's basketball team represented the College of the Holy Cross during the 2022–23 NCAA Division I women's basketball season. The Crusaders, led by third-year head coach Maureen Magarity, played their home games at the Hart Center in Worcester, Massachusetts and were members of the Patriot League.

The Crusaders finished the season 24–8, 13–5 in Patriot League play, to finish in second place. As a No. 2 seed in the Patriot women's tournament, they defeated American in the quarterfinals, Lehigh in the semifinals and Boston University in the championship game. They received an automatic bid to the NCAA women's tournament, where they lost in the first round to Maryland.

== Roster ==
2022–23 Holy Cross Crusaders women's basketball team
Players
Coaches

Pos.	#	Name	Height	Year	Previous school	Hometown
F	0	Callie Wright	6 ft 1 in (1.85 m)	Jr	Bill Crothers Secondary; Memphis	Markham, ON
G	1	Addisyn Cross	5 ft 7 in (1.7 m)	Sr	Villa Maria Academy	Fairview, PA
F	4	Meg Cahalan	6 ft 2 in (1.88 m)	Fr	St. John Vianney	Middletown, NJ
G	5	Kaitlyn Flanagan	5 ft 8 in (1.73 m)	Fr	Plymouth Whitemarsh	Plymouth Meeting, PA
F	10	Janelle Allen	5 ft 11 in (1.8 m)	Jr	Marian Central Catholic	Lake in the Hills, IL
G	13	Bronagh Power-Cassidy	5 ft 10 in (1.78 m)	Jr	Marianapolis Prep	Dublin, Ireland
G	15	Cara McCormack	5 ft 3 in (1.6 m)	Jr	St. John the Baptist DHS	Smithtown, NY
G	21	Grace Munt	5 ft 11 in (1.8 m)	So	Rumson-Fair Haven Regional	Fair Haven, NJ
G	24	Simone Fortman	5 ft 9 in (1.75 m)	Fr	St. Andrew's Episcopal	Odenton, MD
G	33	Mary-Elizabeth Donnelly	6 ft 0 in (1.83 m)	Fr	Manasquan	Manasquan, NJ
G	34	Lauren Huber	5 ft 10 in (1.78 m)	So	Libertyville	Libertyville, IL
F	35	Lindsay Berger	6 ft 2 in (1.88 m)	So	Parkland	Orefield, PA

Head coach

- Maureen Magarity (Marist)

Assistant coach(es)

- Clare Fitzpatrick (Cornell)
- Kat Fogarty (New Hampshire)
- John McCray (Ohio State)

Legend

- (C) Team captain
- (S) Suspended
- (I) Ineligible
- (W) Walk-on
- Injured
- Current redshirt

Roster
Last update: March 5, 2025

== Schedule ==
Date time, TV	Rank^{#}	Opponent^{#}	Result	Record	Site (attendance) city, state
Non-conference regular season
November 7, 2022*; 7:00 p.m.		at Merrimack	W 67–39	1–0	Hammel Court; North Andover, MA
November 11, 2022*; 8:00 p.m., FloSports		at Marquette	L 55–75	1–1	Al McGuire Center (1,283); Milwaukee, WI
November 16, 2022*; 7:00 p.m., ESPN+		New Hampshire	W 56–49	2–1	Hart Center (306); Worcester, MA
November 20, 2022*; 1:00 p.m., ESPN+		Conn College	W 65–49	3–1	Hart Center (253); Worcester, MA
November 23, 2022*; 12:00 p.m., ACCNX		at Boston College	L 42–52	3–2	Conte Forum (604); Chestnut Hill, MA
November 27, 2022*; 2:00 p.m., ESPN+		at Dartmouth	W 68–55	4–2	Leede Arena (351); Hanover, NH
November 30, 2022*; 7:00 p.m., ESPN+		at Brown	W 60–45	5–2	Pizzitola Sports Center (138); Providence, RI
December 3, 2022*; 1:00 p.m., NESN		at Northeastern	W 60–55	6–2	Cabot Center (202); Boston, MA
December 8, 2022*; 7:00 p.m., ESPN+		Stonehill	W 74–62	7–2	Hart Center (212); Worcester, MA
December 11, 2022*; 2:00 p.m., ESPN+		at UMass Lowell	W 62–57	8–2	Costello Athletic Center (201); Lowell, MA
December 20, 2022*; 10:30 a.m., ESPN+		Vermont	L 34–64	8–3	Hart Center (1,812); Worcester, MA
Patriot League regular season
December 30, 2022; 2:00 p.m., ESPN+		at Bucknell	W 62–45	9–3 (1–0)	Sojka Pavilion (509); Lewisburg, PA
January 2, 2023; 12:30 p.m., ESPN+		Navy	W 53–40	10–3 (2–0)	Hart Center (453); Worcester, MA
January 5, 2023; 7:00 p.m., ESPN+		at American	W 62–45	11–3 (3–0)	Bender Arena (217); Washington, D.C.
January 8, 2023; 2:00 p.m., ESPN+		at Loyola (MD)	W 53–46	12–3 (4–0)	Reitz Arena (250); Baltimore, MD
January 11, 2023; 7:00 p.m., ESPN+		Lehigh	W 66–64	13–3 (5–0)	Hart Center (137); Worcester, MA
January 14, 2023; 2:00 p.m., ESPN+		Lafayette	W 66–50	14–3 (6–0)	Hart Center (308); Worcester, MA
January 18, 2023; 11:00 a.m., ESPN+		at Colgate	W 59–49	15–3 (7–0)	Cotterell Court (1,219); Hamilton, NY
January 21, 2023; 2:00 p.m., ESPN+		Bucknell	W 69–50	16–3 (8–0)	Hart Center (354); Worcester, MA
January 25, 2023; 6:00 p.m., ESPN+		Lehigh	L 74–76 ^{OT}	16–4 (8–1)	Stabler Arena (497); Bethlehem, PA
January 28, 2023; 2:00 p.m., ESPN+		Army	L 66–74	16–5 (8–2)	Hart Center (1,571); Worcester, MA
February 4, 2023; 12:30 p.m., ESPN+		at Navy	W 71–52	17–5 (9–2)	Alumni Hall (853); Annapolis, MD
February 8, 2023; 6:00 p.m., ESPN+		at Lafayette	W 67–49	18–5 (10–2)	Kirby Sports Center (523); Easton, PA
February 11, 2023; 2:00 p.m., NBCSB/ESPN+		American	L 65–67 ^{OT}	18–6 (10–3)	Hart Center (463); Worcester, MA
February 15, 2023; 6:00 p.m., ESPN+		at Boston University; Rivalry	L 59–66	18–7 (10–4)	Case Gym (714); Boston, MA
February 18, 2023; 2:00 p.m., ESPN3		Colgate	L 56–60	18–8 (10–5)	Hart Center (1,042); Worcester, MA
February 22, 2023; 7:00 p.m., ESPN+		Loyola (MD)	W 59–51	19–8 (11–5)	Hart Center (1,042); Worcester, MA
February 25, 2023; 7:00 p.m., ESPN3		at Army	W 60–54	20–8 (12–5)	Christl Arena (1); West Point, NY
March 1, 2023; 7:00 p.m., ESPN+		Boston University; Rivalry	W 57–50	21–8 (13–5)	Hart Center (880); Worcester, MA
Patriot League women's tournament
March 6, 2023; 7:00 p.m., ESPN+	(2)	(7) American; Quarterfinals	W 73–44	22–8	Hart Center (384); Worcester, MA
March 9, 2023; 7:00 p.m., ESPN+	(2)	(3) Lehigh; Semifinals	W 71–54	23–8	Hart Center (398); Worcester, MA
March 12, 2023; 12:00 p.m., CBSSN	(2)	at (1) Boston University; Championship game/rivalry	W 66–61	24–8	Case Gym (1,305); Boston, MA
NCAA women's tournament
March 17, 2023*; 2:30 p.m., ESPNews	(15 G1)	at (2 G1) No. 7 Maryland; First round	L 61–93	24–9	Xfinity Center (4,415); College Park, MD
*Non-conference game. ^{#}Rankings from AP poll. (#) Tournament seedings in parentheses. G1=Greenville 1. All times are in Eastern.

== See also ==
- 2022–23 Holy Cross Crusaders men's basketball team
