= Lafayette Leopards women's basketball =

| 2026–27 Lafayette Leopards women's basketball team |
- University: Lafayette College
- Head coach: Ben O'Brien (1st season)
- Location: Easton, Pennsylvania
- Arena: Kirby Sports Center (capacity: 3,500)
- Conference: Patriot
- Nickname: Leopards
- Colors: Maroon and white

Conference tournament champions
- 1985, 1987, 1988

Conference regular-season champions
- 1985, 1987, 1988

Uniforms
| Home | Away |

The Lafayette Leopards women’s basketball team is the college basketball program representing Lafayette College in Easton, Pennsylvania. The Leopards currently participate as part of the NCAA Division I basketball, and compete in the Patriot League. The Leopards currently play their home games at the Kirby Sports Center.

Since the Leopards began play in 1972, they have an all-time record of 571–810 (through 2024–25), though they have had only one winning season since 1997–98, when in the COVID-19 interrupted 2019–20 season they finished 15–14. They have never appeared in the NCAA Tournament, but they went to the Eastern Association of Intercollegiate Athletics for Women (EAIAW) playoffs in 1977, 1978, and 1981. They won the East Coast Conference title in 1985, 1987, and 1988.

== History ==
The Lafayette women's basketball team has a strong tradition and has played intercollegiate competition since 1973, two seasons after women were first admitted on campus. For the first half of its history until the Patriot League era in the early 1990s, women's basketball had a winning tradition that entailed five 20-win seasons and five appearances in the ECC Championship game in seven seasons of league play. Additionally, the women had 17 winning seasons in 22 years of play. Since 1993–94, the Leopards have had only one winning season. During that span, they have had two double-digit wins seasons: 2007–08 and 2010–11.

Lafayette quickly established a winning tradition. In their fourth season, the Leopards went 10–1, followed by a 15–3 season in 1976–77. Led by head coach Barbara Young, the Leopards received their first postseason bid to the Eastern Association of Intercollegiate Athletics for Women (EAIAW) playoffs (NCAA predecessor). The Leopards defeated Kutztown University before bowing out to Princeton University in their second loss to the Tigers that season. Lafayette qualified again in 1978 and defeated Loyola University (MD) before losing to Monmouth University by one point.

Pat Fisher took over the squad in 1980–81 and would coach the Leopards for the next 20 seasons. She quickly established strong squads. Her first season entailed another AIAW bid, but the Leopards lost at home to Saint Peter's University, then Saint Peter's College. In 1982–83, the Leopards started ECC play and quickly established their dominance in the league. Lafayette won 20 or more games for five straight seasons, including their best record ever of 24–6 in 1984–85 and 1986–87. Lafayette won the 1985 ECC Tournament Championship by crushing Lehigh by 20 and defeated the Mountain Hawks for the second title in 1987. Lafayette made the championship game in 1984, 1986, and 1988, but lost to Drexel University and the University of Delaware twice by a combined 11 points.

During the 1980s, the Leopards were led by their best players in history. Maureen McManus and Stacey Cagnello, who played together from 1983–1987, finished first and second on the all-time career scoring list with 1,813 and 1,520 points, respectively. McManus also led the team in rebounding for two seasons. The squad was also led by Beth Mowins, who finished her career as the all-time leader in assists with 703, more than 400 ahead of the current second place leader, and is also ranked 11th in all-time scoring. Mowins later went on to serve as a sportscaster at ESPN and serves a color commentator for many major college basketball and football games.

The Leopards entered Patriot League play in 1990–91 and posted two 19-win seasons in 1992 and 1993. In December 1992, Heidi Caruso tied the all-time women's NCAA individual record for steals in a game against Kansas State University with 14. She still holds the record and led the nation in steals in 1992, 1993, and 1994, with her 1993 and 1994 mark being the third and fourth best individual marks to date. She is the NCAA women's third all-time steals leader. After going 7–5 in Patriot League play and 15–13 overall in 1997–98, the Leopards have not had a winning record in Patriot League play or in a season. Pat Fisher stepped down following 2001 with a 295–284 career mark in 21 years. Tammy Smith promptly took over the program, but the Leopards won only 55 games in nine seasons, including 27 wins in the Patriot League. However, the Leopards made a miracle run to the 2009 Patriot League Championship game. After a 6–21 season and only two league wins, the Leopards knocked off American University and Navy to reach the championship game, where the fell by eight to Lehigh.

Diane Nolan took over the program in 2010 and led the Leopards to their second double-digit win total in 13 years. The Leopards are currently led by phenom shot-blocker Danielle Fiacco, who despite missing a portion of the 2010–11 season to injury, managed to finish with 71 blocks as a freshman. Halfway through her sophomore campaign, she set a new Lafayette record with 161 blocks and counting. She finished the season ranked second in the NCAA with 3.73 blocks per game behind Baylor's Brittney Griner.

| Season | Coach | Record | Conference record |
|---|---|---|---|
| 1972–73 | Sharon Mitchell | 4–2 | n/a |
| 1973–74 | Sharon Mitchell | 4–4 | n/a |
| 1974–75 | Sharon Mitchell | 4–6 | n/a |
| 1975–76 | Barbara Young | 10–1 | n/a |
| 1976–77 | Barbara Young | 15–3 | n/a |
| 1977–78 | Barbara Young | 14–4 | n/a |
| 1978–79 | Barbara Young | 9–8 | n/a |
| 1979–80 | Barbara Young | 11–9 | n/a |
| 1980–81 | Pat Fisher | 13–7 | n/a |
| 1981–82 | Pat Fisher | 7–16 | n/a |
| 1982–83 | Pat Fisher | 13–12 | n/a |
| 1983–84 | Pat Fisher | 16–10 | n/a |
| 1984–85 | Pat Fisher | 24–6 | n/a |
| 1985–86 | Pat Fisher | 21–8 | n/a |
| 1986–87 | Pat Fisher | 24–6 | 6–4 |
| 1987–88 | Pat Fisher | 20–10 | n/a |
| 1988–89 | Pat Fisher | 20–9 | n/a |
| 1989–90 | Pat Fisher | 11–17 | 6–6 |
| 1990–91 | Pat Fisher | 10–19 | 4–8 |
| 1991–92 | Pat Fisher | 19–10 | 11–3 |
| 1992–93 | Pat Fisher | 19–9 | 10–4 |
| 1993–94 | Pat Fisher | 18–9 | 9–5 |
| 1994–95 | Pat Fisher | 3–24 | 3–11 |
| 1995–96 | Pat Fisher | 6–21 | 3–9 |
| 1996–97 | Pat Fisher | 14–15 | 5–7 |
| 1997–98 | Pat Fisher | 15–13 | 7–5 |
| 1998–99 | Pat Fisher | 8–20 | 4–8 |
| 1999-00 | Pat Fisher | 7–22 | 4–8 |
| 2000–01 | Pat Fisher | 7–21 | 3–9 |
| 2001–02 | Tammy Smith | 3–25 | 1–13 |
| 2002–03 | Tammy Smith | 3–25 | 2–12 |
| 2003–04 | Tammy Smith | 1–27 | 1–13 |
| 2004–05 | Tammy Smith | 5–23 | 3–11 |
| 2005–06 | Tammy Smith | 8–20 | 3–11 |
| 2006–07 | Tammy Smith | 7–23 | 5–9 |
| 2007–08 | Tammy Smith | 14–16 | 6–8 |
| 2008–09 | Tammy Smith | 8–22 | 2–12 |
| 2009–10 | Tammy Smith | 6–23 | 4–10 |
| 2010–11 | Dianne Nolan | 11–19 | 4–10 |
| 2011–12 | Dianne Nolan | 8–22 | 2–12 |
| 2012–13 | Dianne Nolan | 11–19 | 4–10 |
| 2013–14 | Dianne Nolan | 14–16 | 8–10 |
| 2014–15 | Dianne Nolan | 14–17 | 6–12 |
| 2015–16 | Theresa Grentz | 6–23 | 4–14 |
| 2016–17 | Theresa Grentz | 4–28 | 2–16 |
| 2017–18 | Kia Damon-Olson | 11–19 | 6–11 |
| 2018–19 | Kia Damon-Olson | 9–22 | 2–16 |
| 2019–20 | Kia Damon-Olson | 15–14 | 11–7 |
| 2020–21 | Kia Damon-Olson | 5–8 | 1–5 |
| 2021–22 | Kia Damon-Olson | 12–18 | 7–11 |
| 2022–23 | Kia Damon-Olson | 10–19 | 7–11 |
| 2023–24 | Kia Damon-Olson | 10–20 | 5–13 |
| 2024–25 | Kia Damon-Olson | 10–21 | 6–12 |
| 2025–26 | Kia Damon-Olson | 10–18 | 6–11 |
