= Colgate Raiders women's basketball =

Women's collegiate basketball program

2025–26 Colgate Raiders women's basketball team
- University: Colgate University
- Head coach: Shannon Bush (1st season)
- Conference: Patriot
- Location: Hamilton, New York
- Arena: Cotterell Court (capacity: 1,750)
- Nickname: Raiders
- Colors: Maroon and white

Uniforms
Home	Away

NCAA tournament appearances
- 2004

Conference tournament champions
- 2004

The Colgate Raiders women’s basketball team is the college basketball program representing Colgate University in Hamilton, New York. The Raiders currently participate as part of the NCAA Division I basketball, and compete in the Patriot League. The Raiders currently play their home games at the Cotterell Court.

== History ==
They joined the Patriot League in 1990. They were previously in the MECA for the 1986–87 season and the All-North Atlantic Conference for the 1989–90 season. They have made one NCAA Tournament appearance, losing to Tennessee 77–54 in the First Round in 2004.

Season	Coach	Record	Conference record
1973–74	Ruth Goehring	4–6	n/a
1974–75	Ruth Goehring	5–7	n/a
1975–76	Ruth Goehring	5–6	n/a
1976–77	Ruth Goehring	8–5	n/a
1977–78	Ruth Goehring	12–4	n/a
1978–79	Ruth Goehring	12–9	n/a
1979–80	Robert Hart	11–9	n/a
1980–81	Kathleen Connell	19–6	n/a
1981–82	Kathleen Connell	11–18	n/a
1982–83	Kathleen Connell	8–19	n/a
1983–84	Kathleen Connell	12–17	n/a
1984–85	Kathleen Connell	10–18	n/a
1985–86	Kathleen Connell	16–11	n/a
1986–87	Kathleen Connell	14–13	6–4
1987–88	Kathleen Connell	13–14	n/a
1988–89	Kathleen Connell	10–17	n/a
1989–90	Kathleen Connell	11–16	6–6
1990–91	Kathleen Connell	14–14	6–6
1991–92	Kathleen Connell	5–22	4–10
1992–93	Liz Feeley	4–23	3–11
1993–94	Liz Feeley	7–20	6–8
1994–95	Liz Feeley	12–15	9–5
1995–96	Ron Rohn	12–17	5–7
1996–97	Ron Rohn	7–20	3–9
1997–98	Ron Rohn	10–17	2–10
1998–99	Ron Rohn	8–19	4–8
1999-00	Ron Rohn	13–16	6–6
2000–01	Ron Rohn	7–22	3–9
2001–02	Beth Combs	14–17	7–7
2002–03	Beth Combs	9–18	4–10
2003–04	Beth Combs	21–10	10–4
2004–05	Kristin Hughes	12–18	6–8
2005–06	Kristin Hughes	9–20	6–8
2006–07	Kristin Hughes	6–25	4–10
2007–08	Pam Bass	1–29	0–14
2008–09	Pam Bass	5–25	1–13
2009–10	Pam Bass	10–19	5–9
2010–11	Pam Bass	7–22	2–12
2011–12	Nicci Hays Fort	8–22	5–9
2012–13	Nicci Hays Fort	10–21	3–11
2013–14	Nicci Hays Fort	8–22	4–14
2014–15	Nicci Hays Fort	9–22	7–11
2015–16	Nicci Hays Fort	7–23	4–14
2016–17	Bill Cleary	10–20	7–11
2017–18	Bill Cleary	7–23	3–15
2018–19	Bill Cleary	12–17	8–10
2019–20	Bill Cleary	19–11	11–7
2020–21	Bill Cleary	1–8	1–8
2021–22	Ganiyat Adeduntan	16–14	10–8
2022–23	Ganiyat Adeduntan	20–14	10–8
2023–24	Ganiyat Adeduntan	23–10	13–5

== Postseason appearances ==
The Raiders have made the NCAA Division I women's basketball tournament once. They are 0–1 in NCAA Tournament appearances.

Year	Round	Opponent	Result
2004	First Round	Tennessee	L 54–77
