= 2023 Patriot League women's basketball tournament =

- Classification: Division I
- Season: 2022–23
- Teams: 10
- Site: Campus sites
- Champions: Holy Cross (14th title)
- Winning coach: Maureen Magarity (1st title)
- Television: ESPN+, CBSSN

The 2023 Patriot League women's basketball tournament was the conference postseason tournament for the Patriot League. The tournament was held March 4, 6, 9, and 12, 2023, at campus sites of the higher seeds. The winner receives the conference's automatic bid to the NCAA tournament.

2022–23 Patriot League women's basketball standings
	Conf.				Overall
Team	W		L	PCT	W		L	PCT
Boston University	17	–	1	.944	24	–	8	.750
Holy Cross†	13	–	5	.722	24	–	8	.750
Lehigh	12	–	6	.667	17	–	14	.548
Colgate	10	–	8	.556	16	–	14	.533
Army	10	–	8	.556	13	–	17	.433
Bucknell	9	–	9	.500	13	–	17	.433
Lafayette	7	–	11	.389	10	–	19	.345
American	7	–	11	.389	9	–	22	.290
Loyola	4	–	14	.222	10	–	21	.323
Navy	1	–	17	.056	1	–	29	.033
† 2023 Patriot League tournament winner As of March 11, 2023

== Seeds ==
All ten teams in the conference standings qualify for the tournament. The teams are seeded by record in conference, with a tiebreaker system to seed teams with identical conference records.

The tiebreakers used by the Patriot League are: 1) head-to-head record of teams with identical record, 2) comparison of records against individual teams in the conference starting with the top-ranked team(s) and working down, 3) NCAA NET Rankings available on day following the conclusion of Patriot League regular-season play and 4) comparison of winning percentage versus out-of-league common opponents.

Seed	School	Conference	Tiebreaker
1	Boston University	17–1	
2	Holy Cross	13–5	
3	Lehigh	12–6	
4	Colgate	10–8	2–0 vs. Lehigh
5	Army	10–8	0–2 vs. Lehigh
6	Bucknell	9–9	
7	American	7–11	1–1 vs. Holy Cross
8	Lafayette	7–11	0–2 vs. Holy Cross
9	Loyola (MD)	4–14	
10	Navy	1–17	

== Schedule ==
Game	Time	Matchup	Score	Television	Attendance
First round – Saturday, March 4
1	4:00 pm	No. 9 Loyola (MD) at No. 8 Lafayette	61–52	ESPN+	567
2	5:00 pm	No. 10 Navy at No. 7 American	71–78	ESPN+	423
Quarterfinals – Monday, March 6
3	6:00 pm	No. 9 Loyola (MD) at No. 1 Boston University	52–66	ESPN+	422
4	7:00 pm	No. 7 American at No. 2 Holy Cross	44–73	ESPN+	384
5	6:00 pm	No. 6 Bucknell at No. 3 Lehigh	55–63	ESPN+	685
6	7:00 pm	No. 5 Army at No. 4 Colgate	55–50	ESPN+	782
Semifinals – Thursday, March 9
7	6:00 pm	No. 5 Army at No. 1 Boston University	68–84^{OT}	ESPN+	454
8	7:00 pm	No. 3 Lehigh at No. 2 Holy Cross	54–71	ESPN+	398
Championship – Sunday, March 12
9	Noon	No. 2 Holy Cross at No. 1 Boston University	66–61	CBSSN	1,305
Game times in ET. Rankings denote tournament seeding. All games hosted by higher-seeded team.

== Bracket ==
First round Saturday, March 4, 2023; ESPN+
8	Lafayette	52
9	Loyola (MD)	61
7	American	78
10	Navy	71

Quarterfinals; Monday, March 6, 2022; ESPN+
1	Boston University	66
9	Loyola (MD)	52
4	Colgate	50
5	Army	55
3	Lehigh	63
6	Bucknell	55
2	Holy Cross	73
7	American	44

Semifinals; Thursday, March 9, 2022; ESPN+
1	Boston University	84*
5	Army	68
3	Lehigh	54
2	Holy Cross	71

Championship; Sunday, March 12, 2022; CBSSN
1	Boston University	61
2	Holy Cross	66

* denotes overtime period
