= Navy Midshipmen women's basketball =

Women's college basketball team

Navy Midshipmen
| 2025–26 Navy Midshipmen women's basketball team |
- University: United States Naval Academy
- Head coach: Tim Taylor (5th season)
- Location: Annapolis, Maryland
- Arena: Alumni Hall (capacity: 5,710)
- Conference: Patriot
- Nickname: Midshipmen
- Colors: Navy blue and gold

NCAA Division I tournament appearances
- 2011, 2012, 2013

Conference tournament champions
- 2011, 2012, 2013

Conference regular-season champions
- 2011, 2013, 2014, 2026

Uniforms
| Home | Away |

The Navy Midshipmen women's basketball team is the women's basketball team that represents the United States Naval Academy in Annapolis, Maryland. The team currently competes in the Patriot League. The Midshipmen are currently coached by Tim Taylor.

== History ==
The 1976–77 season, while played under a junior varsity level, was the first year in which women first attended the Naval Academy. The following year, the team played under the Division II label, playing from 1979 until 1991, when they rose up to Division I and joined the Patriot League.

In 2008, Navy hired Stefanie Pemper as head coach. From 2008 to her final season in 2020, Pemper became the winningest coach in the program's history with a 214–164 record. She was fired on March 10, 2020, and succeeded by Tim Taylor on April 28.

== NCAA tournament results ==
| Year | Seed | Round | Opponent | Result |
|---|---|---|---|---|
| 2011 | #14 | First Round | #3 DePaul | L 43-56 |
| 2012 | #15 | First Round | #2 Maryland | L 44-59 |
| 2013 | #15 | First Round | #2 Kentucky | L 41-61 |
