= Bucknell Bison women's basketball =

| 2025-26 Bucknell Bison women's basketball team |
- University: Bucknell University
- Head coach: Trevor Woodruff (6th season)
- Location: Lewisburg, Pennsylvania
- Arena: Sojka Pavilion (capacity: 4,000)
- Conference: Patriot
- Nickname: Bison
- Colors: Blue and orange

NCAA Division I tournament appearances
- 2002, 2008, 2017, 2019

Conference tournament champions
- 2002, 2008, 2017, 2019

Conference regular-season champions
- 1996, 2006, 2016, 2017, 2019, 2020

Uniforms
| Home | Away |

The Bucknell Bison women's basketball team is the college basketball program representing Bucknell University in Lewisburg, Pennsylvania. The Bison currently participate as a member of the NCAA Division I, and compete in the Patriot League. The Bison currently play their home games at the Sojka Pavilion.

== History ==
As of the 2015–16 season, the Bison have an all-time record of 499–593. They played in the East Coast Conference from 1982 to 1990 before joining the Patriot League in 1990. They played in their first NCAA Tournament in 2002 after winning the Patriot League Tournament. In the first round, they lost to Baylor 80–56. In 2008, they qualified again for the Tournament after winning the Patriot League title, though they lost to North Carolina 85–50 in the first round. Since playing in the Patriot League beginning in 1990, they have a 193–169 record in the conference.

| Season | Record | Conference record | Coach |
|---|---|---|---|
| 1973–74 | 3–3 | n/a | Barbara Testa |
| 1974–75 | 2–6 | n/a | Barbara Testa |
| 1975–76 | 6–4 | n/a | Barbara Testa |
| 1976–77 | 6–4 | n/a | Rebecca Carr |
| 1977–78 | 8–8 | n/a | Rebecca Carr |
| 1978–79 | 9–6 | n/a | Rebecca Carr |
| 1979–80 | 8–12 | n/a | Rebecca Carr |
| 1980–81 | 7–12 | n/a | Terrie Grieb |
| 1981–82 | 5–19 | n/a | Karen Harden |
| 1982–83 | 8–17 | 2–7 | Karen Harden |
| 1983–84 | 9 17 | 1 7 | Cindy Connelley |
| 1984–85 | 4–22 | 1–13 | Lori Howard |
| 1985–86 | 11–17 | 4–11 | Lori Howard |
| 1986–87 | 17–11 | 7–7 | Lori Howard |
| 1987–88 | 18–11 | 8–6 | Lori Howard |
| 1988–89 | 16–12 | 7–7 | Lori Howard |
| 1989–90 | 9–19 | 5–9 | Lori Howard |
| 1990–91 | 2–24 | 1–11 | Lori Howard |
| 1991–92 | 7–20 | 4–10 | Juliene Simpson |
| 1992–93 | 11–17 | 8–6 | Juliene Simpson |
| 1993–94 | 6–21 | 3–11 | Juliene Simpson |
| 1994–95 | 11–17 | 7–7 | Juliene Simpson |
| 1995–96 | 18–9 | 10–2 | Juliene Simpson |
| 1996–97 | 12–14 | 6–6 | Juliene Simpson |
| 1997–98 | 12–14 | 6–6 | Kathy Fedorjaka |
| 1998–99 | 13–14 | 8–4 | Kathy Fedorjaka |
| 1999-00 | 15 15 | 8–4 | Kathy Fedorjaka |
| 2000–01 | 20–8 | 9–3 | Kathy Fedorjaka |
| 2001–02 | 21–10 | 11–3 | Kathy Fedorjaka |
| 2002–03 | 13–15 | 7–7 | Kathy Fedorjaka |
| 2003–04 | 15–14 | 7–7 | Kathy Fedorjaka |
| 2004–05 | 10–18 | 4–10 | Kathy Fedorjaka |
| 2005–06 | 18–11 | 10–4 | Kathy Fedorjaka |
| 2006–07 | 20–11 | 12–2 | Kathy Fedorjaka |
| 2007–08 | 16–16 | 8–6 | Kathy Fedorjaka |
| 2008–09 | 16–12 | 8–6 | Kathy Fedorjaka |
| 2009–10 | 7–21 | 3–11 | Kathy Fedorjaka |
| 2010–11 | 11–17 | 7–7 | Kathy Fedorjaka |
| 2011–12 | 5–25 | 3–11 | Kathy Fedorjaka/Bill Broderick |
| 2012–13 | 15–16 | 5–9 | Aaron Roussell |
| 2013–14 | 16–14 | 11–7 | Aaron Roussell |
| 2014–15 | 18–12 | 10–8 | Aaron Roussell |
| 2015–16 | 25–8 | 17–1 | Aaron Roussell |
| 2016–17 | 27–6 | 16–2 | Aaron Roussell |
| 2017–18 | 22–10 | 15–3 | Aaron Roussell |
| 2018–19 | 28–6 | 16–2 | Aaron Roussell |

== NCAA tournament results ==
Bucknell has made the NCAA Division I women's basketball tournament four times. They have a record of 0-4.

| Year | Seed | Round | Opponent | Result |
|---|---|---|---|---|
| 2002 | #15 | First round | #2 Vanderbilt | L 56-80 |
| 2008 | #16 | First round | #1 North Carolina | L 50-85 |
| 2017 | #14 | First round | #3 Maryland | L 61-103 |
| 2019 | #12 | First round | #5 Florida State | L 67-70 |
