= Boston University Terriers women's basketball =

2026–27 Boston University Terriers women's basketball team
- University: Boston University
- Head coach: Melissa Graves (6th season)
- Location: Boston, Massachusetts
- Arena: Case Gym (capacity: 1,800)
- Conference: Patriot
- Nickname: Terriers
- Colors: Scarlet and white

NCAA Division I tournament appearances
- 2003

AIAW tournament appearances
- 1980

Conference tournament champions
- 1988, 1989, 2003

Conference regular-season champions
- 2023

Uniforms
Home	Away

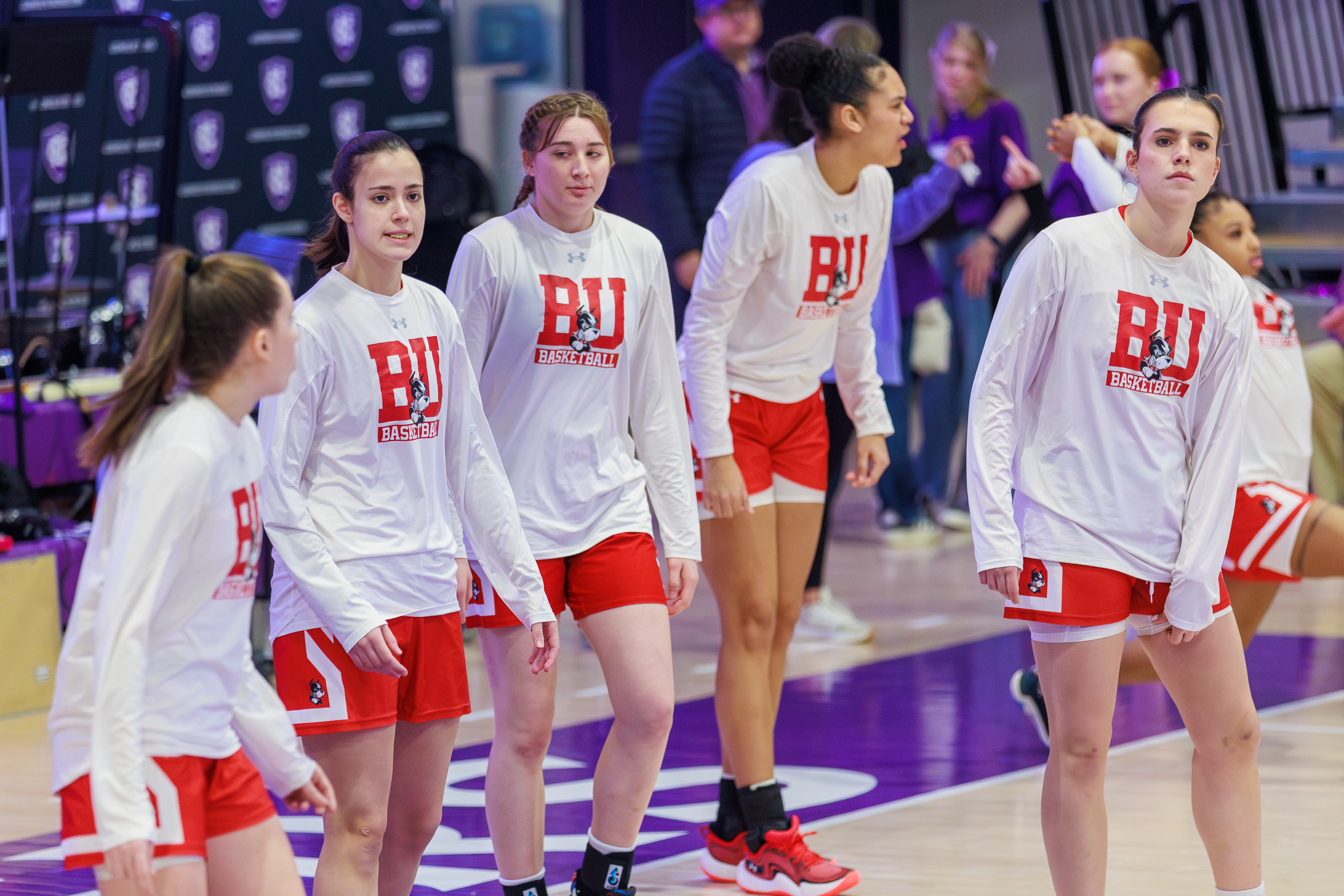
Members of the 2024-25 team warm up before a game

The Boston University Terriers women’s basketball is the team for the college basketball program representing Boston University in Boston, Massachusetts. The Terriers currently participate as part of the NCAA Division I basketball, and compete in the Patriot League. The Terriers currently play their home games at Case Gym.

== History ==
Since beginning play in 1975, the Terriers have an all-time record of 571-564. Boston University won the America East Conference women's basketball tournament thrice in their time in the conference (1988, 1989, 2003, with runner up status in 1986, 1990, 2004-2006, 2008, 2009, 2011). They have played in just one NCAA Tournament, in 2003. In the first round, they were defeated 91–44 by UConn.

The Terriers are currently coached by seventh-year head coach Melissa Graves. Prior to Graves, Marisa Moseley, served as their head coach, who previously served as an assistant coach at UConn under head coach Geno Auriemma for nine seasons.

Prior to Moseley, Katy Steding served as head coach from the 2014-2015 season until Moseley took over in April 2018. Under her guidance, the Terriers had a 31-88 record. Moseley left for Wisconsin in 2021.

== Postseason appearances ==
=== NCAA Division I ===
Year	Round	Opponent	Result
2003	First Round	Connecticut	L 44-91

=== WNIT results ===
Year	Round	Opponent	Result
2009	First Round; Second Round	Central Connecticut; Boston College	W 79–60; L 53–68
2010	First Round	Providence	L 58–64
2023	First Round	Rhode Island	L 40–46

=== AIAW Division I ===
The Terriers made one appearance in the AIAW National Division I basketball tournament, with a combined record of 0–1.

Year	Round	Opponent	Result
1980	First Round	Kansas State	L, 68–72
