= Cotterell Court =

Arena at Colgate University in Hamilton, New York

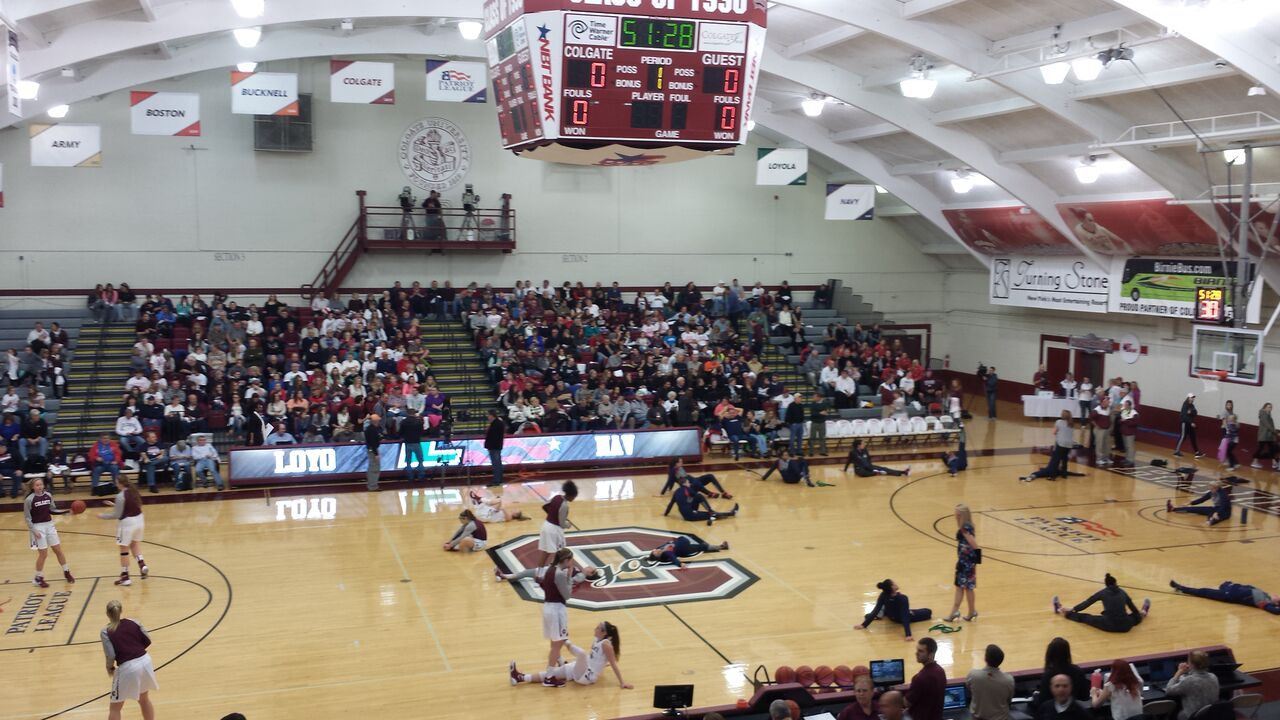
- View of the court during a basketball game in 2015
- Interactive map of Cotterell Court
- Address: 13 Oak Drive; Hamilton, NY; U.S.
- Coordinates: 42.814957°N 75.542754°W
- Owner: Colgate University
- Operator: Colgate University Athletics
- Capacity: 1,750 (basketball / volleyball)
- Type: Arena
- Surface: Hardwood
- Current use: Basketball; Volleyball

Construction
- Opened: 1959; 67 years ago
- Renovated: 2001

Tenants
- Colgate Raiders teams: men's (1959–) and women's (1973–) basketball, volleyball

Website
- colgateathletics.com/facilities/cotterell-court/4

Cotterell Court is a 1,750-seat multi-purpose arena in Hamilton, New York. It was built in 1959 and is home to the Colgate University Raiders basketball and volleyball teams. It is named for Wesley M. Cotterell '19, a two-time letterwinner in basketball and school trustee. The basketball arena was built as the northern half of the William A. Reid Athletic Center, a twin barrel-vaulted complex which also houses Starr Rink. The complex is located on the western side of campus next to Andy Kerr Stadium and across Broad Street from Huntington Gymnasium, the school's former athletics facility. The hardwood was replaced in 2016 for the first time since the venue's opening. The gym has bleacher seating on three sides, with the main sides being the east and west sides and a much shorter section on the north side. The main entrance to the arena is on the south side, leading into the rest of the athletic center.

Cotterell Court hosted the championship game of the 1995, 1996, 2019, 2020 Patriot League men's basketball tournament, and most recently in 2024, and also hosted the 2004 Patriot League women's basketball tournament. It has also hosted many notable concerts over the years, often as part of Colgate's homecoming or other university events. These include a November 4, 1977 Grateful Dead show which was recorded and released in its entirety on their 2014 live album Dave's Picks Volume 12. Other concerts include The Doors with Stone Poneys in 1968, Bob Marley on Halloween in 1979, and Phish in 1993.

== See also ==
- List of NCAA Division I basketball arenas
