= Sojka Pavilion =

Bucknell University's home basketball court in Lewisburg, PA

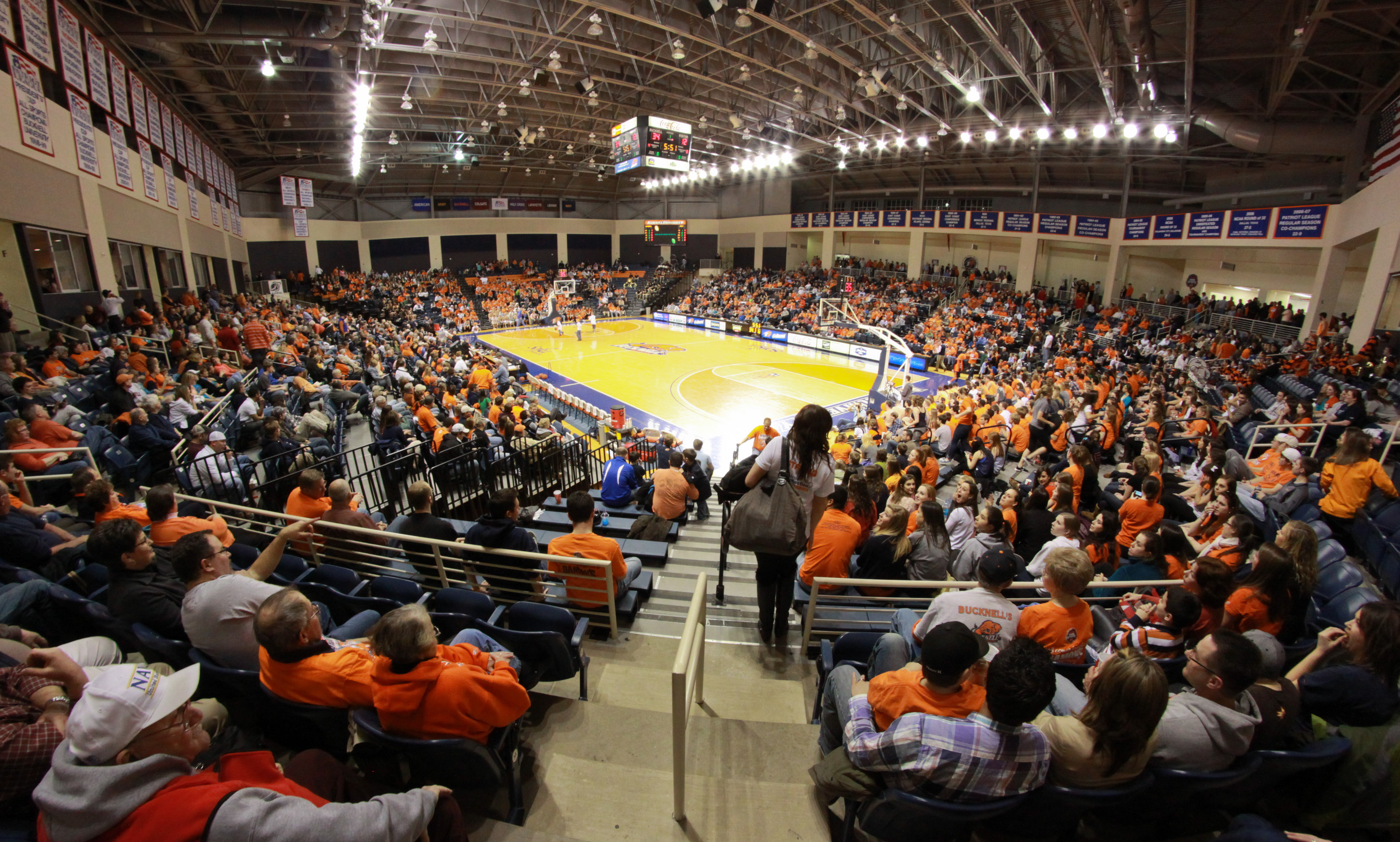
- Interactive map of Sojka Pavilion
- Location: 701 Moore Avenue; Lewisburg, PA 17837
- Coordinates: 40.956964°N 76.887093°W
- Owner: Bucknell University
- Operator: Bucknell University
- Capacity: 4,000
- Surface: Hardwood floor

Construction
- Groundbreaking: May 2001
- Opened: January 15, 2003
- Cost: $31.5 million ($55.1 million in 2025 dollars)
- Architects: Ewing Cole Cherry Brott; Rosser International; Wallover Architects
- General contractors: Mowery & Associates

Tenants
- Bucknell Bison men's basketball (Patriot League) (2003–present); Bucknell Bison women's basketball (Patriot League) (2003–present)

Sojka Pavilion is a 4,000-seat multi-purpose arena in Lewisburg, Pennsylvania. It was built in 2003 and is home to the Bucknell University Bison basketball teams, replacing nearby Davis Gym. It is named for Dr. Gary Allan Sojka, a former president of the university who remained at the university as a professor of biology after the end of his term, until his retirement in 2006. It features locker rooms, a hardwood playing surface, a team store, two concession stands, LED video boards, and a Jumbotron.

In 2006, 2011, 2012, 2013, 2017 and 2018, Sojka Pavilion hosted the Patriot League men's basketball tournament championship final game.

== See also ==
- List of NCAA Division I basketball arenas
