= Sue Troyan =

American basketball coach

Playing career
- 1984–1988: Dickinson College

Coaching career (HC unless noted)
- 1995–2022: Lehigh

Head coaching record
- Overall: 420–352 (.544)
- Tournaments: 0–4 (NCAA)

Accomplishments and honors

Championships
- Patriot League (1997, 2009, 2010, 2021)

Awards
- Patriot League Coach of the Year (2005, 2009)

Sue Troyan is an American basketball coach who was the head women's basketball coach at Lehigh University, a position that she held from 1995 to 2022. Prior to coaching basketball at Lehigh, she was the university's softball coach for five years.

== Playing career ==
While attending Dickinson College in Carlisle, Pennsylvania, Troyan competed in both basketball and track. She was voted the basketball team's most valuable player following her 1988 senior season, and was a three-time All-American in track.

== Head coaching record ==
Record table
Season	Team	Overall	Conference	Standing	Postseason
Lehigh Mountain Hawks (Patriot League) (1995–present)
1995–96	Lehigh	14–13	5–7	4th	
1996–97	Lehigh	15–15	7–5	3rd	NCAA Tourney first round
1997–98	Lehigh	11–17	4–8	5th	
1998–99	Lehigh	15–12	6–6	4th	
1999–2000	Lehigh	13–16	6–6	4th	
2000–01	Lehigh	16–14	7–5	3rd	
2001–02	Lehigh	12–16	8–6	3rd	
2002–03	Lehigh	12–15	9–5	3rd	
2003–04	Lehigh	13–16	9–5	3rd	
2004–05	Lehigh	16–14	9–5	2nd	
2005–06	Lehigh	10–18	5–9	6th	
2006–07	Lehigh	11–19	5–9	7th	
2007–08	Lehigh	18–13	9–5	3rd	
2008–09	Lehigh	26–7	12–2	1st	NCAA Tourney first round
2009–10	Lehigh	29–4	13–1	1st	NCAA Tourney first round
2010–11	Lehigh	21–11	10–4	2nd	WNIT first round
2011–12	Lehigh	17–13	9–5	2nd	
2012–13	Lehigh	14–16	6–8	5th	
2013–14	Lehigh	13–18	5–13	8th	
2014–15	Lehigh	19–12	9–9	6th	
2015–16	Lehigh	18–13	10–8	4th	
2016–17	Lehigh	10–20	5–13	9th	
2017–18	Lehigh	15–15	9–9	4th	
2018–19	Lehigh	21–10	12–6	3rd	
2019–20	Lehigh	19–11	10–8	6th	
2020–21	Lehigh	10–6	7–5	2nd of 3 Central	NCAA Tourney first round
2021–22	Lehigh	19–11	11–7	5th	
Lehigh:		430–361 (.544)	218–178 (.551)		
Total:		430–361 (.544)			

== Personal life ==
She met her future husband Fran while finishing undergraduate studies at Dickinson University, where he was enrolled at Penn State Dickinson Law. When she accepted a graduate assistant's job with Lehigh's University women's basketball team and pursued her Master of Business Administration at Lehigh, he worked in nearby Allentown. She was offered an assistant coach's job with the basketball team and the head coaching position with the university's softball team. Fran became her assistant in softball and took over the head coaching job in 1995, after she was named the new head basketball head coach.

They reside in Lower Saucon Township, Pennsylvania, and have three children.
