= Bob Schneider (basketball) =

Bob Schneider (born August 25, 1936) is a retired American high school and university sports coach. Schneider started his coaching career with high schools in Texas and New Mexico between 1958 and 1978. During this time period, Schneider was primarily a coach for Canyon High School from 1966 to 1978. With Canyon, Schneider won five basketball and three track titles in the 3A girls division as part of the University Interscholastic League. He also had 350 wins and 59 losses with the girls basketball team at Canyon.

As a university basketball coach, Schneider had 49 wins and 38 losses for Texas Woman's University between 1978 and 1981. After joining West Texas State University in 1981, Schneider's team reached the final of 1988 NCAA Division II women's basketball tournament. After the university was renamed to West Texas A&M in 1993, Schneider remained with the team until 2006. With West Texas, Schneider won the Lone Star Conference women's basketball tournament eight times. After leaving the university with 585 wins and 163 losses, Schneider had a combined total of 1045 wins and 293 losses in basketball. He received a WBCA National Coach of the Year Award in 1997 and became part of the Women's Basketball Hall of Fame in 2022.

== Early life and education ==
Schneider was born in Darrouzett, Texas on August 25, 1936. He lived with his family at a farm while playing on varsity teams during his education. By the late 1950s, Schneider went to Oklahoma Panhandle State, Clarendon College and West Texas State University for his post-secondary studies.

== Career ==
=== High school ===
After Schneider could not find work in sportscasting following his education, Schneider became a history teacher and multi-sport coach for Darrouzett High School in 1958. Between 1958 and 1966, Schneider primarily worked in Clayton, New Mexico before going to McLean High School in Texas. During this time period, he worked as a track and football coach for boys. With the girls, Schneider coached the basketball team at McLean.

Between 1966 and 1978, Schneider worked at Canyon High School and was their basketball and track coach for girls. He was also one of the coaches for Canyon's football team that year. As part of the University Interscholastic League, Schneider won five basketball titles between 1969 and 1978 with Canyon in the 3A division. His Canyon track team also won the UIL title consecutively from 1976 to 1978 as part of the 3A division. In boys football, Schneider continued to coach the junior varsity team during the 1960s and 1970s. Overall, Schneider had 350 wins and 59 losses with the girls basketball team at Canyon.

=== College ===
In 1978, Schneider started coaching the women's basketball team for Texas Woman's University. As part of the AIAW, Schneider had 49 wins and 38 losses. In 1981, Schneider was hired to work as a gym teacher for West Texas State University. He was also selected to coach the West Texas State women that year in track and basketball.

During the 1980s, West Texas reached the first round in 1985 and 1986 at the National Women's Invitational Tournament. As a member of the Lone Star Conference, West Texas State won the Lone Star Conference women's basketball tournament from 1987 to 1991. With the NCAA, Schneider and his team reached the final of the 1988 NCAA Division II women's basketball tournament.

In 1993, West Texas State was renamed to West Texas A&M. With West Texas A&M, Schneider had won the Lone Star Conference tournament three more times between 1995 and 2006. After leaving in 2006, Schneider had 585 wins and 163 losses in women's basketball games with West Texas. When he ended his basketball career that year, Schneider had a combined total of 1045 wins and 293 losses.

== Honors and personal life ==
As the Basketball Coach of the Year for the Texas Panhandle Sports Hall of Fame from 1974 to 1997, Schneider won this award two times with Canyon and three times with West Texas. As their Track and Field Coach of the Year, Schneider won the 1977 award for Canyon. He joined their Hall of fame in 2006. When "100 of the top coaches...in UIL [h]istory" were chosen in 2021, Schneider was on their girls basketball coaches list.

For West Texas, Schneider was the 1985 Coach of the Year for the Oil Country Athletic Conference in basketball. For the Lone Star Conference, Schneider was the sole women's basketball Coach of the Year four times and a co-winner two times between 1987 and 2006. In 2007, the LSC picked Schneider as one of their "top 75 men's and women's basketball players and coaches".

Schneider entered the Texas High School Basketball Hall of Fame in 1997. He also received the WBCA National Coach of the Year Award in 1997 for Division II schools in the NCAA. In 2000, Schneider was on the 20th Century's Top 100 Sports Legends of the Texas Panhandle list by the Amarillo Globe-News. He joined hall of fames for West Texas A&M and the North Texas Junior College Athletic Conference in 2011. During 2022, Schneider became part of the Women's Basketball Hall of Fame. Schneider had three kids during his marriage.

== See also ==
- List of college women's basketball career coaching wins leaders
