= 2015 Patriot League women's basketball tournament =

Women's basketball tournament

- Classification: Division I
- Season: 2014–15
- Teams: 10
- Site: Campus sites
- Television: CBS Sports Network

2014–15 Patriot League women's basketball standings
	Conf.				Overall
Team	W		L	PCT	W		L	PCT
American†	16	–	2	.889	24	–	8	.750
Army	14	–	4	.778	23	–	8	.742
Holy Cross	11	–	7	.611	15	–	17	.469
Bucknell	10	–	8	.556	18	–	12	.600
Navy	10	–	8	.556	17	–	14	.548
Lehigh	9	–	9	.500	19	–	12	.613
Colgate	7	–	11	.389	9	–	22	.290
Lafayette	6	–	12	.333	14	–	17	.452
Loyola (MD)	5	–	13	.278	7	–	23	.233
Boston University	2	–	16	.111	5	–	25	.167
† 2015 Patriot League tournament winner As of March 19, 2015; Rankings from AP poll

The 2015 Patriot League women's basketball tournament was held March 4, 6, 10 and 15 at campus sites of the higher seed. The winner of the tournament received an automatic bid to the NCAA tournament.

American won the tournament after defeating Lehigh, 66–50, in the championship game.

== Seeds ==
Teams are seeded by conference record, with a ties broken by record between the tied teams followed by record against the regular-season champion, if necessary.

Seed	School	Conference	Overall	Tiebreaker
1	American	15-2	20-8	
2	Army	14-4	22-6	
3	Holy Cross	11-7	15-16	
4	Bucknell	10-8	18-11	2-0 vs. Navy
5	Navy	10-8	16-13	0-2 vs. Bucknell
6	Lehigh	9-9	17-11	
7	Colgate	7-11	8-21	
8	Lafayette	6-12	13-16	
9	Loyola (MD)	5-13	7-22	
10	Boston U	2-16	5-24	

== Schedule ==
Game	Time*	Matchup^{#}	Television	Attendance
First round – Wednesday, March 4
1	7:00 pm	#9 Loyola (MD) at #8 Lafayette		692
2	7:00 pm	#10 Boston University at #7 Colgate		376
Quarterfinals – Friday, March 6
3	7:00 pm	#8 Lafayette at #1 American		319
4	7:00 pm	#5 Navy at #4 Bucknell		495
5	6:00 pm	#6 Lehigh at #3 Holy Cross		357
6	7:00 pm	#7 Colgate at #2 Army		487
Semifinals – Monday, March 9
7	7:00 pm	#5 Navy at #1 American		545
8	7:00 pm	#6 Lehigh at #2 Army		542
Championship – Saturday, March 14
9	6:00 pm	#6 Lehigh at #1 American	CBSSN	1,014
*Game times in EST. #-Rankings denote tournament seeding.

== Bracket ==
First round March 4
8	Lafayette	58
9	Loyola	46
7	Colgate	58
10	Boston U	48

Quarterfinals; March 6
1	American	79
8	Lafayette	56
4	Bucknell	49
5	Navy	60
2	Army	48^{OT}
7	Colgate	45
3	Holy Cross	62
6	Lehigh	75

Semifinals; March 9
1	American	60
5	Navy	53
2	Army	57
6	Lehigh	76

Championship; March 14; CBS Sports Network
1	American	66
6	Lehigh	50
