= List of college women's basketball career coaching wins leaders =

This is a list of college women's basketball coaches by number of career wins. The list includes coaches with at least 600 wins at the NCAA, AIAW and NAIA levels. Geno Auriemma, head coach of the UConn Huskies since 1985, is at the top of the list with 1,288 career wins. The highest winning percentage in the group also belongs to Geno Auriemma, with a .886 career winning percentage. The fastest coach to reach 600 wins is GP Gromacki, current head coach of Division III Amherst College, who reached the mark in his 686th game on February 2, 2024.

== NCAA and NAIA women's basketball coaches with 600 wins ==
=== Key ===
	Expected to be active in the 2026–27 season
*	Elected to the Women's Basketball Hall of Fame as a coach
†	Elected to the Naismith Memorial Basketball Hall of Fame as a coach
**	Elected as a coach to both the Naismith Memorial Basketball Hall of Fame and the Women's Basketball Hall of Fame

The source for all statistics and schedules for NCAA teams is https://stats.ncaa.org/head_coaches

Sources for NAIA teams are specified in the relevant entries.

=== Coaches ===
Statistics updated at the end of the 2025–26 season.

Rank	Name	Years	Wins	Losses	Pct.	Teams (Seasons)
1	Geno Auriemma **	41	1,288	166	.886	UConn (1985–)
2	Tara VanDerveer **	45	1,216	271	.818	Idaho (1978–80), Ohio State (1980–85), Stanford (1985–95, 1996–2024)
3	Pat Summitt **	38	1,098	208	.841	Tennessee (1974–2012)
4	Barbara Stevens **	43	1,058	291	.784	Clark (MA) (1977–83), Massachusetts (1983–86), Bentley (1986–2020)
5	C. Vivian Stringer **	50	1,055	426	.712	Cheyney (1971–83), Iowa (1983–95), Rutgers (1995–2022)
6	Sylvia Hatchell **	44	1,023	405	.716	Francis Marion (1975–86), North Carolina (1986–2019)
7	Andy Yosinoff	48	951	326	.745	Emmanuel (MA) (1977–)
8	Muffet McGraw **	38	936	293	.762	Lehigh (1982–87), Notre Dame (1987–2020)
9	Tom Shirley	44	922	398	.698	DeSales (1981–89), Jefferson (1989–)
10	Jim Foster *	40	903	347	.722	Saint Joseph's (1978–91), Vanderbilt (1991–2002), Ohio State (2002–13), Chattanooga (2013–2018)
11	Jody Conradt **	38	900	309	.744	Sam Houston (1969–73), UT Arlington (1973–76), Texas (1976–2007)
12	Lisa Bluder	40	884	396	.691	St. Ambrose (1984–90), Drake (1990–2000), Iowa (2000–2024)
13	Wes Moore	37	880	275	.762	Maryville (TN) (1987–93), Francis Marion (1995–98), Chattanooga (1998–2013), NC State (2013–)
14	Joe Foley	37	866	324	.728	Arkansas Tech (1987–2003), Little Rock (2003–2024)
15	Robin Selvig	38	865	286	.752	Montana (1978–2016)
16	Andy Landers *	36	862	299	.742	Georgia (1979–2015)
17	Gary Blair **	37	852	348	.710	Stephen F. Austin (1985–93), Arkansas (1993–2003), Texas A&M (2003–2022)
18	Dave Slifer	37	848	300	.739	Mount Mercy (1989–95), Missouri Western State (1995–2004), Central Missouri (2004–)
19	Curt Fredrickson	39	846	306	.734	Northern State (1977–83, 1985–2018)
20	Bill Fennelly	38	822	388	.679	Toledo (1988–95), Iowa State (1995–)
21	Kevin Borseth	37	821	316	.722	Michigan Tech (1987–98), Michigan (2007–12), Green Bay (1998–2007, 2012–2024)
22	Michael Strong	34	815	182	.817	Scranton (1979–94, 1995–2014)
23	Michael Miller	40	808	263	.754	Messiah (1986–)
24	Mark Campbell *	27	800	130	.860	Union (TN) (1999–)
25	Mike Davis	35	797	349	.695	Columbia (MO) (2001–14), Central Methodist (1987–99, 2015–2024)
26	Gordy Presnell	39	794	392	.669	Seattle Pacific (1987–2005), Boise State (2005–)
27	Doug Bruno *	38	786	405	.660	DePaul (1976–78, 1988–2024)
28	Joe McKeown	40	785	453	.634	New Mexico State (1986–89), George Washington (1989–2008), Northwestern (2008–2026)
29-T	Harry Perretta	42	783	489	.616	Villanova (1978–2020)
29-T	Kim Mulkey **	26	783	130	.858	Baylor (2000–2021), LSU (2021–)
31	Michael Durbin	41	782	303	.721	Wittenberg (1985–86), Saint Benedict (1986–)
32	Nancy Fahey *	36	779	232	.771	Washington (MO) (1986–2017), Illinois (2017–2022)
33	Glenn Wilkes Jr.	40	769	368	.676	Rollins (1986–)
34	Kris Huffman	33	760	165	.822	DePauw (1993–)
35	Brian Morehouse	30	758	107	.876	Hope (1996–)
36	Stephanie Gaitley	39	757	419	.644	Richmond (1985–91), Saint Joseph's (1991–2001), LIU Brooklyn (2002–08), Monmouth (2008–11), Fordham (2011–2022), Fairleigh Dickinson (2023–)
37	Phillip Kahler	34	757	171	.816	St. John Fisher (1974–2008)
38	Dixie Jeffers	39	744	287	.722	Rio Grande (1983–86), Capital (1986–2022)
39	Cheri Harrer	36	742	252	.746	Baldwin Wallace (1990–)
40	Debbie Ryan *	34	739	324	.695	Virginia (1977–2011)
41-T	Kay Yow **	38	737	344	.682	Elon (1971–75), NC State (1975–2009)
41-T	John Wethington	37	737	428	.633	Lindsey Wilson (1989–)
43	Joanne Bracker *	42	736	403	.646	Midland (NE) (1970–2012)
44	Dale Neal	26	735	185	.799	Freed–Hardeman (1994–2020)
45	Carmen Dolfo	35	734	281	.723	Western Washington (1990–2003, 2004–)
46	David Smalley	34	733	348	.678	Rio Grande (1992–)
47	Russ Davis	30	720	199	.783	Vanguard (1996–)
48	Judy Blinstrub	39	719	330	.685	Babson (1984–2023)
49	Sue Gunter **	34	708	308	.697	Stephen F. Austin (1968–80), LSU (1982–2004)
50-T	Cindy Russo	38	707	408	.634	Lamar (1978–80), FIU (1977–78, 1980–2015)
50-T	Brian Niemuth	39	707	322	.687	Simpson (1987–)
52	Lonnie Kruse	33	706	244	.743	Sterling (KS) (1981–2014)
53	Lisa Stone	38	704	391	.643	Cornell (IA) (1985–88), Wisconsin–Eau Claire (1988–2000), Drake (2000–2003), Wisconsin (2003–2011), Saint Louis (2012–2022), WashU (2024–)
54	Jamie Sale	28	703	225	.758	Briar Cliff (1998–2001), Morningside (2001–)
55	Joan Bonvicini	36	701	421	.625	Long Beach State (1979–91), Arizona (1991–2008), Seattle (2009–2016)
56	Fred Richter	36	700	274	.719	DeSales (1990–)
57	Dave Krauth	34	695	302	.697	Augustana (SD) (1989–2023)
58-T	Connie Tilley	42	693	312	.690	St. Norbert (1977–2019)
58-T	Rene Portland	31	693	265	.723	Saint Joseph's (1976–78), Colorado (1978–80), Penn State (1980–2007)
60	Jeff Mittie	34	691	396	.636	Missouri Western (1992–95), Arkansas St. (1995–99), TCU (1999–2014), Kansas St. (2014–)
61	Yvonne Kauffman	42	689	328	.677	Elizabethtown (1970–2012)
62	Brenda Frese	27	688	208	.768	Ball State (1999–2001), Minnesota (2001–02), Maryland (2002–)
63	Marty Rowe	28	684	222	.755	Brescia University (1998–2004), Lee (2004–)
64	Dawn Staley	26	683	194	.779	Temple (2000–2008), South Carolina (2008–)
65-T	Buffie Burson	32	682	300	.695	North Georgia (1994–)
65-T	Mike McLaughlin	30	682	246	.735	Holy Family (1995–2009), Penn (2009–2020, 2021–)
67-T	Tom Jessee	33	681	291	.701	Bluefield St. (1988–1997), Tampa (2002–)
67-T	Theresa Grentz **	35	681	362	.653	Saint Joseph's (1974–76), Rutgers (1976–95), Illinois (1995–2007), Lafayette (2015–17)
69	Nancy Winstel	32	675	255	.726	Midway (1978–81), Northern Kentucky (1983–2012)
70	Karl Smesko	26	672	139	.829	Walsh (1997–98), Purdue Fort Wayne (1999–2001), FGCU (2002–2024)
71	Amy Ruley *	29	671	198	.772	North Dakota State (1979–2008)
72	Michael McDevitt	33	667	231	.743	Southern Maine (2008–09), St. Joseph (ME) (1987–2003, 2009–2025)
73	Nancy Funk	40	663	353	.653	Messiah (1977–86), Johns Hopkins (1986–2017)
74	Gary Fifield	27	660	137	.828	Southern Maine (1987–2008, 2009–15)
75-T	Mary Beth Spirk	38	659	360	.647	Moravian (1987–2024, 2025–)
75-T	Steve Brooks	24	659	176	.789	Indiana Wesleyan (1999–2016), Saint Francis (2017–21), Marian (IN) (2021–2024)
77	Aaron Johnston	27	655	202	.764	South Dakota State (1999–)
78	Lisa Stockton	33	654	371	.638	Greensboro College (1987–90), Tulane (1994–2024)
79	Lonnie Bartley	31	652	258	.716	Fort Valley State (1984–2013, 2015–2017)
80	Tim Shea	30	649	197	.767	Salem State (1981–2011)
81	Kelly Graves	29	648	298	.685	Saint Mary's (CA) (1997–2000), Gonzaga (2000–14), Oregon (2014–)
82	Carroll LaHaye	38	647	376	.632	Randolph–Macon (1982–2020)
83	Joanne P. McCallie	28	646	255	.717	Maine (1992–2000), Michigan State (2000–2007), Duke (2007–2020)
84	Mary Fleig	37	645	377	.631	Franklin & Marshall (1983–90), Millersville (1990–2020)
85	Stephanie Findley	37	640	484	.569	Oklahoma Christian (1985–2022)
86	G. P. Gromacki	25	639	104	.860	St. Lawrence (1998–2004), Hamilton (2006–07), Amherst (2007–)
87	Robin Hagen-Smith	24	637	161	.798	Shawnee State (1989–2013)
88	Bob Schneider *	28	634	201	.759	Texas Woman's (1978–81), West Texas A&M (1981–2006)
89	Lori Culler	35	633	430	.595	Huntington (1986–2022)
90	Kathleen Delaney-Smith	39	630	434	.592	Harvard (1982–2020, 2021–2022)
91-T	Gene Roebuck	25	628	145	.812	North Dakota (1987–2012)
91-T	David Smith	34	628	333	.653	St. Joseph's (IN) (1976–78, 1984–90), Shippensburg (1990–98), Bellarmine (1998–2012), West Virginia State (2012–2016)
93	Scott Rueck	30	627	270	.699	George Fox (1996–2010), Oregon State (2010–)
94	Chris Gobrecht	44	626	662	.486	CSUF (1979–1985), Washington (1985–1996), Florida St. (1996–97), USC (1997–2004), Yale (2005–2015), Air Force (2015–2024)
95	Kissy Walker	35	620	318	.661	Husson (1989–2001, 2003–)
96	Naomi Graves	40	616	451	.577	WPI (1985–91), Springfield (1992–)
97	Royce Chadwick	36	615	466	.569	Oklahoma Panhandle (1984–86), Sam Houston (1986–89), SFA (1994–2001), Marshall (2001–12), Texas A&M Corpus Christi (2012–2025)
98-T	Bill Gibbons Jr.	34	613	410	.599	Holy Cross (1985–2019)
98-T	Robert Skinner	44	613	586	.511	Paine (1980–1991), Albany St. (GA) (1991–2024)
100	Susan Dunagan	33	611	271	.693	Roanoke (1981–2014)
101-T	Wendy Larry	27	608	234	.722	Virginia Wesleyan (1977–78), Arizona (1985–87), Old Dominion (1987–2011)
101-T	Sharon Fanning	36	608	460	.569	Chattanooga (1976–87), Kentucky (1987–95), Mississippi State (1995–2012)
101-T	Wendee Saintsing	35	608	368	.623	Barton (1989–2024)
104-T	Joe Ciampi *	27	607	213	.740	Army (1977–79), Auburn (1979–2004)
104-T	Mike Granelli	32	607	249	.709	Saint Peter's (NJ) (1972–2004)
106-T	J. Randall Ognibene	33	606	264	.697	Mount Saint Mary (1980–2013)
106-T	John Reynolds Jr	38	606	451	.573	Florida Tech (1987–2025)
108	Jim Scheible	35	603	313	.658	Clarkson (1989–1990), Elmira (1992–1999), Rochester (NY) (1999–)
109	Lynne Agee	33	602	334	.643	Roanoke (1978–81), UNC Greensboro (1981–2011)
110	Robin Pingeton	31	601	393	.605	St Ambrose (1992–2000), Illinois State (2003–2010), Missouri (2010–2025), Wisconsin (2025–)

== See also ==
- WBCA National Coach of the Year
- Naismith College Coach of the Year
- AP Coach of the Year
- USBWA Women's National Coach of the Year
