= Lone Star Conference men's basketball tournament =

Men's basketball tournament

- Conference basketball championship
- Sport: Basketball
- Conference: Lone Star Conference
- Number of teams: 8
- Format: Single-elimination tournament
- Played: 1975–present
- Current champion: Dallas Baptist (2nd)
- Most championships: West Texas A&M (12)
- Official website: Lone Star men's basketball

Host locations
- Frisco, TX (2018–2020, 2022–present); Allen, TX (2012–2017); Campus Sites (1975–2011, 2021)

The Lone Star Conference men's basketball tournament is the annual conference basketball championship tournament for the Lone Star Conference. The tournament has been held annually since 1981. It is a single-elimination tournament and seeding is based on regular season records.

The winner, declared conference champion, receives the Lone Star Conference's automatic bid to the NCAA Men's Division II Basketball Championship.

== Results ==
Year	Champions	Score	Runner-up	Venue
1975	Sam Houston State	83–74	Howard Payne	Brownwood, TX
1976	Howard Payne	74–68	Angelo State	Brownwood, TX
1977	East Texas State	77–66	Howard Payne	Brownwood, TX
1978	East Texas State	76–71	Howard Payne	Brownwood, TX
1979	Southwest Texas State	70–69	East Texas State	Huntsville, TX
1980	Southwest Texas State	70–61	Texas A&I	Huntsville, TX
1981	Sam Houston State	89–76	Howard Payne	Huntsville, TX
1982	Sam Houston State	53–50	Stephen F. Austin	Huntsville, TX
1983	Stephen F. Austin	68–56	Sam Houston State	Nacogdoches, TX
1984	Angelo State	83–80	East Texas State	Commerce, TX
1985	Abilene Christian	99–81	Angelo State	Abilene, TX
1986	Abilene Christian	74–65	Texas A&I	Abilene, TX
1987	Abilene Christian	78–69	West Texas State	Abilene, TX
1988	Angelo State	94–73	West Texas State	San Angelo, TX
1989	Angelo State	84–66	Texas A&I	San Angelo, TX
1990	West Texas State	91–70	East Texas State	Commerce, TX
1991	West Texas State	83–70	Central State (OK)	Amarillo, TX
1992	Texas A&I	98–97	Central Oklahoma	Abilene, TX
1993	Eastern New Mexico	76–68	Texas A&M–Kingsville	Abilene, TX
1994	West Texas A&M	85–79	Abilene Christian	Canyon, TX
1995	Central Oklahoma	96–93	Texas A&M–Kingsville	Edmond, OK
1996	Texas A&M–Kingsville	112–95	Central Oklahoma	Commerce, TX
1997	Central Oklahoma	89–85	Texas A&M–Commerce	Edmond, OK
1998	Central Oklahoma	123–101	West Texas A&M	Edmond, OK
1999	Midwestern State	78–62	Tarleton State	Wichita Falls, TX
2000	Midwestern State	93–83	West Texas A&M	Tahlequah, OK
2001	West Texas A&M	75–73^{OT}	Angelo State	San Angelo, TX
2002	Northeastern State (OK)	66–50	Tarleton State	Tahlequah, OK
2003	West Texas A&M	69–61	Tarleton State	Portales, NM
2004	Tarleton State	69–66	Northeastern State	Stephenville, TX
2005	Texas A&M–Commerce	77–62	West Texas A&M	Commerce, TX
2006	West Texas A&M	99–85	Tarleton State	Durant, OK
2007	Midwestern State	89–80	Southeastern Oklahoma State	Wichita Falls, TX
2008	Central Oklahoma	72–70	Texas A&M–Commerce	Bartlesville, OK
2009	Midwestern State	66–60	Southwestern Oklahoma State	Bartlesville, OK
2010	Midwestern State	65–55	Tarleton State	Bartlesville, OK
2011	Central Oklahoma	68–52	Tarleton State	Bartlesville, OK
2012	Midwestern State	57–51	Tarleton State	Allen, TX
2013	Tarleton State	53–50	Midwestern State	Allen, TX
2014	Tarleton State	71–65	Midwestern State	Allen, TX
2015	Texas A&M–Commerce	68–61	Angelo State	Allen, TX
2016	Midwestern State	88–72	Angelo State	Allen, TX
2017	UT Permian Basin	93–85	Angelo State	Allen, TX
2018	West Texas A&M	80–76	Texas–Permian Basin	Frisco, TX
2019	West Texas A&M	57-55	Texas A&M-Commerce	Frisco, TX
2020	West Texas A&M	81–65	St. Edward's	Frisco, TX
2021	West Texas A&M	108–89	St. Edward's	Canyon, TX
2022	West Texas A&M	77–70	Texas A&M–Kingsville	Frisco, TX
2023	West Texas A&M	64–63	Angelo State	Frisco, TX
2024	Eastern New Mexico	91–88	Lubbock Christian	Frisco, TX
2025	Dallas Baptist	76–70	Lubbock Christian	Frisco, TX
2026	Dallas Baptist	76–74	Eastern New Mexico	Frisco, TX

== Championship records ==
School School	Finals Record	Finals Appearances	Years
West Texas A&M (West Texas State)	12–5	17	1990, 1991, 1994, 2001, 2003, 2006, 2018, 2019, 2020, 2021, 2022, 2023
Midwestern State	7–2	9	1999, 2000, 2007, 2009, 2010, 2012, 2016
Central Oklahoma (Central State)	5–3	8	1995, 1997, 1998, 2008, 2011
East Texas A&M (East Texas State, Texas A&M–Commerce)	4–6	10	1977, 1978, 2005, 2015
Tarleton State	3–7	10	2004, 2013, 2014
Angelo State	3–7	10	1984, 1988, 1989
Abilene Christian	3–1	4	1985, 1986, 1987
Sam Houston State (Sam Houston)	3–1	4	1975, 1981, 1982
Texas A&M–Kingsville (Texas A&I)	2–6	8	1992, 1996
Eastern New Mexico	2–1	3	1993, 2024
Dallas Baptist	2–0	2	2025, 2026
Southwest Texas State (Texas State)	2–0	2	1979, 1980
Howard Payne	1–5	6	1976
UT Permian Basin	1–1	2	2017
Northeastern State (OK)	1–1	2	2002
Stephen F. Austin	1–1	2	1983
Lubbock Christian	0–2	2	
St. Edward's	0–2	2	
Southeastern Oklahoma State	0–1	1	
Southwestern Oklahoma State	0–1	1	

- Cameron, Oklahoma Christian, St. Mary's (TX), Sul Ross State, Texas A&M International, UT Tyler, and Western New Mexico have yet to qualify for the tournament finals. Sul Ross State left the LSC after the 1975–76 season and did not return until 2024–25.
- Arkansas–Fort Smith, East Central (OK), Harding, Incarnate Word, and Ouachita Baptist never qualified for the tournament finals as Lone Star Conference members.
- Schools highlighted in pink are former members of the Lone Star Conference.

== See also ==
- Lone Star Conference women's basketball tournament
