= 2014–15 Colgate Raiders women's basketball team =

Intercollegiate basketball season

2014–15 Colgate Raiders women's basketball
- Conference: Patriot League
- Record: 9–22 (7–11 Patriot)
- Head coach: Nicci Hays Fort (4th season)
- Assistant coaches: Melissa D'Amico; Katherine Menendez; Justin Paluch
- Home arena: Cotterell Court

2014–15 Patriot League women's basketball standings
	Conf.				Overall
Team	W		L	PCT	W		L	PCT
American†	16	–	2	.889	24	–	8	.750
Army	14	–	4	.778	23	–	8	.742
Holy Cross	11	–	7	.611	15	–	17	.469
Bucknell	10	–	8	.556	18	–	12	.600
Navy	10	–	8	.556	17	–	14	.548
Lehigh	9	–	9	.500	19	–	12	.613
Colgate	7	–	11	.389	9	–	22	.290
Lafayette	6	–	12	.333	14	–	17	.452
Loyola (MD)	5	–	13	.278	7	–	23	.233
Boston University	2	–	16	.111	5	–	25	.167
† 2015 Patriot League tournament winner As of March 19, 2015; Rankings from AP poll

The 2014–15 Colgate Raiders women's basketball team represented Colgate University during the 2014–15 NCAA Division I women's basketball season. The Raiders, led by fourth year head coach Nicci Hays Fort, played their home games at Cotterell Court and were members of the Patriot League. They finished the season 9–22, 7–11 in Patriot League play to finish in seventh place. They advance to the quarterfinals of the Patriot League women's tournament where they lost to Army.

== Roster ==
Number	Name	Year	Position	Height	Hometown	High School
3	Randyll Butler	Jr.	G	5-8	Chicago, IL	Marist HS
4	Mariah Jones	Sr.	G	5-6	Silver Spring, MD	St. John's College HS
11	Kateri Stone	Fr.	G	6-1	Glen Ellyn, IL	Montini Catholic HS
12	Ariel Etheridge	Fr.	G	5-8	Smithfield, RI	Tabor Academy (Mass)
13	Katie Curtis	So.	G	5-6	Lebanon, IN	Lebanon HS
14	Paige Kriftcher	Jr.	G	5-9	Port Washington, NY	Long Island Lutheran HS
20	Steph Poland	So.	C	6-3	Valley View, OH	Hathaway Brown
21	Missy Repoli	Sr.	G	5-8	Marlboro, NJ	St. John Vianney HS
23	Tori Pozsonyi	Fr.	F	6-1	Roselle Park, NJ	Roselle Catholic HS
25	Josie Stockill	Jr.	F	6-3	Napier, New Zealand	Napier Girls HS
33	Julia Barcello	Fr.	F	6-0	Chandler, AZ	Seton Catholic Prep HS
34	Steph Schultz	Sr.	F/C	6-1	Pottstown, PA	Pottsgrove HS
42	Carole Harris	Sr.	F	5-10	Lansing, MI	Waverly HS

== Schedule ==
Date time, TV	Rank^{#}	Opponent^{#}	Result	Record	Site (attendance) city, state
Exhibition
11/07/2014*; 7:00 pm		King's College	W 91–42	–	Cotterell Court (325); Hamilton, NY
Non-conference regular season
11/15/2014*; 2:00 pm		at Harvard	L 53–68	0–1	Lavietes Pavilion (506); Cambridge, MA
11/19/2014*; 7:00 pm		Cornell	L 66–74	0–2	Cotterell Court (431); Hamilton, NY
11/22/2014*; 2:00 pm		at Drexel	L 51–59	0–3	Daskalakis Athletic Center (552); Philadelphia, PA
11/26/2014*; 7:00 pm		at No. 22 Georgia	L 35–66	0–4	Stegeman Coliseum (2,240); Athens, GA
11/28/2014*; 2:00 pm		at No. 21 Rutgers	L 44–60	0–5	Louis Brown Athletic Center (1,428); Piscataway, NJ
12/02/2014*; 7:00 pm		at St. Bonaventure	L 49–65	0–6	Reilly Center (378); Olean, NY
12/06/2014*; 4:00 pm		Albany	L 48–67	0–7	Cotterell Court (370); Hamilton, NY
12/10/2014*; 7:00 pm		Binghamton	W 74–55	1–7	Cotterell Court (322); Hamilton, NY
12/13/2014*; 2:00 pm		at Monmouth	L 62–82	1–8	Multipurpose Activity Center (346); West Long Branch, NJ
12/21/2014*; 2:00 pm		Kent State	L 61–62	1–9	Cotterell Court (366); Hamilton, NY
12/28/2014*; 4:00 pm		at Siena	L 68–80	1–10	Times Union Center (365); Albany, NY
Patriot regular season
12/31/2014; 2:00 pm		Lehigh	L 68–86	1–11 (0–1)	Cotterell Court (442); Hamilton, NY
01/03/2015; 2:00 pm		at Bucknell	L 75–77 ^{OT}	1–12 (0–2)	Sojka Pavilion (358); Lewisburg, PA
01/07/2015; 7:00 pm		at Holy Cross	W 76–71	2–12 (1–2)	Hart Center (358); Worcester, MA
01/10/2015; 4:00 pm		American	L 58–66	2–13 (1–3)	Cotterell Court (536); Hamilton, NY
01/14/2015; 7:00 pm		at Boston University	L 53–58	2–14 (1–4)	Case Gym (191); Boston, MA
01/17/2015; 4:00 pm		Navy	L 63–65	2–15 (1–5)	Cotterell Court (506); Hamilton, NY
01/21/2015; 7:00 pm		Army	L 62–64	2–16 (1–6)	Cotterell Court (477); Hamilton, NY
01/24/2015; 2:00 pm		at Loyola (MD)	W 72–45	3–16 (2–6)	Reitz Arena (309); Baltimore, MD
01/28/2015; 7:00 pm		at Lafayette	L 56–58	3–17 (2–7)	Kirby Sports Center (248); Easton, PA
01/31/2015; 4:00 pm		Bucknell	W 54–41	4–17 (3–7)	Cotterell Court (783); Hamilton, NY
02/04/2015; 7:00 pm, TWCSC		Holy Cross	L 62–68	4–18 (3–8)	Cotterell Court (617); Hamilton, NY
02/07/2015; 7:00 pm		at American	L 46–75	4–19 (3–9)	Bender Arena (287); Washington, D.C.
02/11/2015; 7:00 pm, TWCSC		Boston University	W 67–54	5–19 (4–9)	Cotterell Court (483); Hamilton, NY
02/14/2015; 4:00 pm		at Navy	L 52–64	5–20 (4–10)	Alumni Hall (742); Annapolis, MD
02/18/2015; 7:00 pm		at Army	L 47–48	5–21 (4–11)	Christl Arena (569); West Point, NY
02/21/2015; 4:00 pm		Loyola (MD)	W 54–53	6–21 (5–11)	Cotterell Court (570); Hamilton, NY
02/25/2015; 7:00 pm		Lafayette	W 49–36	7–21 (6–11)	Cotterell Court (248); Hamilton, NY
02/28/2015; 7:30 pm		at Lehigh	W 61–60	8–21 (7–11)	Stabler Arena (740); Bethlehem, PA
Patriot League Tournament
03/04/2015; 7:00 pm		Boston University; First Round	W 58–48	9–21	Cotterell Court (376); Hamilton, NY
03/06/2015; 7:00 pm		at Navy; Quarterfinals	L 45–48 ^{OT}	9–22	Alumni Hall (487); Annapolis, MD
*Non-conference game. ^{#}Rankings from AP Poll. (#) Tournament seedings in parentheses. All times are in Eastern Time.

== See also ==
- 2014–15 Colgate Raiders men's basketball team
