= Bill Gibbons (basketball) =

American basketball coach

Biographical details
- Born: Worcester, Massachusetts, U.S.
- Education: Clark University

Coaching career (HC unless noted)
- 1986–2019: Holy Cross

Head coaching record
- Overall: 613–410 (.599)

Bill Gibbons, Jr. is an American former women's basketball coach. As head coach for College of the Holy Cross in Worcester, Massachusetts, Gibbons was one of the longest tenured coaches in the NCAA Division I, having debuted as coach during the 1985–86 season and coaching at Holy Cross until 2019. In 2007, Gibbons was an assistant coach on the United States squad that won the gold medal in women's basketball at the Pan American Games.

In October 2014, Gibbons was removed as head basketball coach after a former player, Ashley Cooper, filed a lawsuit against him alleging physical and verbal abuse. He was reinstated to the team in January 2015 after Holy Cross investigated and concluded that "The College believes the lawsuit's allegations have no legal merit" and were false.

On March 28, 2019, Gibbon’s contract was not renewed after a second suspension as head coach.

He was born and raised in Worcester and graduated from Clark University with his B.A. and M.A.

== Coaching career ==
Sources:

- NCAA
- Patriot League record book
- Holy Cross Year-By-Year Records
- Patriot League 2017–18 Women's Basketball Standings
- Patriot League 2016–17 Women's Basketball Standings
- 2015–16 Patriot League WBB

Record table
Season	Team	Overall	Conference	Standing	Postseason
Holy Cross Crusaders (Metro Atlantic Athletic Conference) (1985–1990)
1985–86	Holy Cross	21–7	8–4	3rd	
1986–87	Holy Cross	19–10	8–4	2nd	
1987–88	Holy Cross	21–8	9–3	2nd	
1988–89	Holy Cross	21–10	10–2	2nd	NCAA First round
1989–90	Holy Cross	20–10	7–3	4th	
Holy Cross (MAAC):		102–45 (.694)	42–16 (.724)		
Holy Cross Crusaders (Patriot League) (1990–2019)
1990–91	Holy Cross	25–6	12–0	1st	NCAA Second round
1991–92	Holy Cross	16–13	10–4	T-3rd	
1992–93	Holy Cross	22–7	12–2	1st	
1993–94	Holy Cross	15–14	10–4	3rd	
1994–95	Holy Cross	21–9	12–2	1st	NCAA First round
1995–96	Holy Cross	23–10	9–3	2nd	NCAA First round
1996–97	Holy Cross	23–4	12–0	1st	
1997–98	Holy Cross	21–9	10–2	1st	NCAA First round
1998–99	Holy Cross	21–8	11–1	1st	NCAA First round
1999–00	Holy Cross	23–7	11–1	1st	NCAA First round
2000–01	Holy Cross	21–9	11–1	1st	NCAA First round
2001–02	Holy Cross	23–8	12–2	1st	WNIT First round
2002–03	Holy Cross	24–8	13–1	1st	NCAA First round
2003–04	Holy Cross	13–15	8–6	4th	
2004–05	Holy Cross	20–11	12–2	1st	NCAA First round
2005–06	Holy Cross	16–14	10–4	2nd	
2006–07	Holy Cross	15–18	7–7	3rd	NCAA First round
2007–08	Holy Cross	19–13	10–4	2nd	
2008–09	Holy Cross	13–17	8–6	4th	
2009–10	Holy Cross	10–21	5–9	4th	
2010–11	Holy Cross	10–20	6–8	6th	
2011–12	Holy Cross	19–15	7–7	5th	WBI second round
2012–13	Holy Cross	18–14	8–6	4th	
2013–14	Holy Cross	20–12	10–8	5th	
2014–15	Holy Cross	15–17	11–7	3rd	
2015–16	Holy Cross	13–17	10–8	5th	
2016–17	Holy Cross	8–22	6–12	7th	
2017–18	Holy Cross	13–18	7–11	7th	
Holy Cross (Patriot):		500–356 (.584)	270–128 (.678)		
Total:		602–401 (.600)	312–144 (.684)		
National champion Postseason invitational champion Conference regular season champion Conference regular season and conference tournament champion Division regular season champion Division regular season and conference tournament champion Conference tournament champion

== See also ==
- List of college women's basketball career coaching wins leaders
