= 2014–15 American Eagles women's basketball team =

Intercollegiate basketball season

2014–15 American Eagles women's basketball

Patriot League Regular Season & Tournament Champions

NCAA Women's Tournament, first round
- Conference: Patriot League
- Record: 24–9 (16–2 Patriot)
- Head coach: Megan Gebbia (2nd season)
- Assistant coaches: Tiffany Coll; Nikki Flores; Emily Stallings
- Home arena: Bender Arena

2014–15 Patriot League women's basketball standings
	Conf.				Overall
Team	W		L	PCT	W		L	PCT
American†	16	–	2	.889	24	–	8	.750
Army	14	–	4	.778	23	–	8	.742
Holy Cross	11	–	7	.611	15	–	17	.469
Bucknell	10	–	8	.556	18	–	12	.600
Navy	10	–	8	.556	17	–	14	.548
Lehigh	9	–	9	.500	19	–	12	.613
Colgate	7	–	11	.389	9	–	22	.290
Lafayette	6	–	12	.333	14	–	17	.452
Loyola (MD)	5	–	13	.278	7	–	23	.233
Boston University	2	–	16	.111	5	–	25	.167
† 2015 Patriot League tournament winner As of March 19, 2015; Rankings from AP poll

The 2014–15 American Eagles women's basketball team represented American University during the 2014–15 NCAA Division I women's basketball season. The Eagles, led by second year head coach Megan Gebbia, played their home games at Bender Arena and were members of the Patriot League. They finished the season 24–9, 16–2 in Patriot League play to win the Patriot League Regular Season Championship. They also won the Patriot League women's tournament to earn an automatic trip to the NCAA women's tournament for the first time in school history, where they lost to Iowa in the first round.

== Roster ==
2014–15 American Eagles women's basketball team
Players
Coaches

Pos.	#	Name	Height	Year	Previous school	Hometown
G	1	Asha Henley	5 ft 5 in (1.65 m)	Fr	Blake	Silver Spring, MD
G	2	Shaquilla Curtis	5 ft 9 in (1.75 m)	Sr	Archbishop Spalding	Baltimore, MD
G	3	Jen Dumiak	5 ft 10 in (1.78 m)	Sr	La Costa Canyon	Carlsbad, CA
G	4	Emily Kinneston	5 ft 8 in (1.73 m)	Fr	Champlain Valley Union	Shelburne, VT
F	10	Lauren Crisler	6 ft 2 in (1.88 m)	So	North Penn	North Wales, PA
F	12	Michelle Holmes	6 ft 1 in (1.85 m)	Jr	Notre Dame Academy	Toledo, OH
F	13	Arron Zimmerman	6 ft 0 in (1.83 m)	Sr	Saint John Vianney School	Wayside, NJ
F	14	Maria Liddane	5 ft 7 in (1.7 m)	Fr	Grosse Point North	Goosse Pointe Woods, MI
G/F	20	Jordan Light	6 ft 0 in (1.83 m)	So	Good Counsel	Vienna, VA
G	21	Kate Bond	5 ft 9 in (1.75 m)	Fr	Mount St. Mary	Norman, OK
G	32	Ari Booth	5 ft 7 in (1.7 m)	Jr	Pflugerville	Pflugerville, TX
F	33	Michael Harris	6 ft 1 in (1.85 m)	Fr	Abington	Abington, PA

Head coach

- Megan Gebbia

Assistant coach(es)

- Tiffany Coll
- Nikki Flores
- Emily Stallings

Legend

- (C) Team captain
- (S) Suspended
- (I) Ineligible
- (W) Walk-on
- Injured
- Current redshirt

Roster

== Schedule ==
Date time, TV	Rank^{#}	Opponent^{#}	Result	Record	Site (attendance) city, state
Non-conference regular season
11/17/2015*; 5:00 pm		George Washington	L 52–63	0–1	Bender Arena (526); Washington, D.C.
11/20/2015*; 7:00 pm		James Madison	L 65–69	0–2	Bender Arena (338); Washington, D.C.
11/23/2015*; 7:00 pm		Princeton	L 56–63	0–3	Bender Arena (1,628); Washington, D.C.
11/28/2015*; 6:30 pm		vs. Gonzaga; South Point Thanksgiving Shootout	W 59–56	1–3	South Point Arena (N/A); Enterprise, NV
11/29/2015*; 9:00 pm		vs. Oregon; South Point Thanksgiving Shootout	W 72–64	2–3	South Point Arena (177); Enterprise, NV
12/03/2015*; 7:00 pm		UMBC	W 77–51	3–3	Bender Arena (198); Washington, D.C.
12/06/2015*; 12:00 pm		at Massachusetts	L 61–71	3–4	Mullins Center (338); Amherst, MA
12/12/2015*; 7:00 pm		at No. 14 Maryland	L 50–94	3–5	Xfinity Center (3,498); College Park, MD
12/17/2015*; 7:00 pm		at Manhattan	W 60–52	4–5	Draddy Gymnasium (188); Bronx, NY
12/20/2015*; 2:00 pm		at Maryland Eastern Shore	W 64–52	5–5	Hytche Athletic Center (214); Princess Anne, MD
12/28/2015*; 2:00 pm		at Wake Forest	L 64–77	5–6	LJVM Coliseum (551); Winston-Salem, NC
Patriot League regular season
12/31/2015; 12:00 pm		at Bucknell	W 60–55	6–6 (1–0)	Sojka Pavilion (526); Lewisburg, PA
01/03/2015; 1:00 pm		at Holy Cross	W 74–63	7–6 (2–0)	Hart Center (873); Worcester, MA
01/07/2015; 7:00 pm		Loyola (MD)	W 62–50	8–6 (3–0)	Bender Arena (148); Washington, D.C.
01/10/2015; 4:00 pm		at Colgate	W 66–58	9–6 (4–0)	Cotterell Court (536); Hamilton, NY
01/14/2015; 7:00 pm		at Lehigh	W 75–73 ^{OT}	10–6 (5–0)	Stabler Arena (671); Bethlehem, PA
01/17/2015; 2:00 pm		Lafayette	W 63–44	11–6 (6–0)	Bender Arena (759); Washington, D.C.
01/21/2015; 7:00 pm		Boston University	W 75–45	12–6 (7–0)	Bender Arena (172); Washington, D.C.
01/24/2015; 3:00 pm		at Army	L 60–68	12–7 (7–1)	Christl Arena (764); West Point, NY
01/27/2015; 8:00 pm, ASN		Navy	W 59–49	13–7 (8–1)	Bender Arena (436); Washington, D.C.
01/31/2015; 2:00 pm		Holy Cross	L 61–67	13–8 (8–2)	Bender Arena (578); Washington, D.C.
02/04/2015; 7:00 pm		at Loyola (MD)	W 55–44	14–8 (9–2)	Reitz Arena (267); Baltimore, MD
02/07/2015; 2:00 pm		Colgate	W 75–46	15–8 (10–2)	Bender Arena (287); Washington, D.C.
02/11/2015; 7:00 pm		Lehigh	W 74–64	16–8 (11–2)	Bender Arena (219); Washington, D.C.
02/14/2015; 2:00 pm		at Lafayette	W 74–58	17–8 (12–2)	Kirby Sports Center (514); Easton, PA
02/18/2015; 7:00 pm		at Boston University	W 58–50	18–8 (13–2)	Case Gym (148); Boston, MA
02/21/2015; 1:00 pm		Army	W 45–42	19–8 (14–2)	Bender Arena (408); Washington, D.C.
02/25/2015; 7:00 pm		at Navy	W 41–29	20–8 (15–2)	Alumni Hall (1,026); Annapolis, MD
02/28/2015; 4:00 pm		Bucknell	W 65–55	21–8 (16–2)	Bender Arena (717); Washington, D.C.
Patriot League Women's Tournament
03/06/2015; 7:00 pm		Lafayette; Quarterfinals	W 79–56	22–8	Bender Arena (319); Washington, D.C.
03/09/2015; 7:00 pm		Navy; Semifinals	W 60–53	23–8	Bender Arena (545); Washington, D.C.
03/14/2015; 6:00 pm, CBSSN		Lehigh; Championship Game	W 66–50	24–8	Bender Arena (1,014); Washington, D.C.
NCAA Women's Tournament
03/20/2015*; 2:30 pm, ESPN2		at No. 18 Iowa; First Round	L 67–75	24–9	Carver–Hawkeye Arena (4,429); Iowa City, IA
*Non-conference game. ^{#}Rankings from AP poll. (#) Tournament seedings in parentheses. All times are in Eastern Time.

== See also ==
- 2014–15 American Eagles men's basketball team
