= Nancy Winstel =

Nancy H. Winstel (born December 10, 1953) is an American retired head women's basketball coach who coached at Northern Kentucky University from 1983 through 2012.

At the time of her retirement, Winstel ranked 3rd in wins and 9th in winning percentage among active NCAA Division II women's basketball coaches and 5th in wins and 21st in winning percentage among all time coaches with an overall record of 675–255 (73%). At Northern Kentucky University, Winstel compiled a record of 636–214 (75%). In 2000, NKU won the NCAA Women's Division II Basketball Championship, the first national championship in the history of the school and the first national championship by a Kentucky college women's team in any sport at any level. NKU won their second NCAA Women's Division II Basketball Championship in 2008, becoming one of only five schools to win more than one. The 2006–2007 team and Winstel are the subject of Thirteen Women Strong: The Making of a Team, written by NKU English professor Robert K. Wallace.

Born in Newport, Kentucky, Winstel is a graduate of St. Thomas High School in Fort Thomas, Kentucky. She received her BA in physical education and history from Northern Kentucky University in 1977. She was a walk in on NKU's first women's basketball team. She then after received her master's degree in physical education with an emphasis on coaching from Indiana University Bloomington in 1978, then soon became head women's basketball coach at Midway College in Kentucky for three years. In 1981, she returned to NKU as assistant coach for the women's basketball and volleyball teams and head coach of the women's softball team for two years before becoming head women's basketball coach in 1983.

Winstel announced her retirement on March 28, 2012, after 29 seasons at Northern Kentucky University.

== Coaching milestones ==
In 2009, Winstel achieved her 600th overall victory as a college coach.

== Tournament record ==
Winstel's teams have won two national championships (2000, 2008), finished as national runner-up once (2003), have appeared in five final fours (1987, 1998, 2000, 2003, 2008), and have qualified for the NCAA tournament 20 times. Her teams have won or shared the Great Lakes Valley Conference championship ten times, most recently in 2009.

== Honors ==
Winstel was named Women's Basketball Coaches Association Division II National Coach of the Year honor in 1999–2000. She has been named Great Lakes Valley Conference Coach of the Year six times. In December 2009, she was named National Coach of the Decade by the Women's Division II Bulletin, which also named the NKU women's basketball team the program of the decade.

Winstel still ranks 3rd on the school's all-time list for rebounding averaging 8.3 per game. During the 1974–1977 seasons she also averaged 10.3 points per game in her first season.

== See also ==
- List of college women's basketball career coaching wins leaders
