= Dave Slifer =

American college basketball coach

Current position
- Title: Head coach
- Team: Central Missouri
- Conference: The MIAA
- Record: 464–201 (.698)

Biographical details
- Born: Charleston, Illinois
- Education: Mount Mercy University; Eastern Illinois University

Coaching career (HC unless noted)
- 1989–1995: Mount Mercy
- 1985–2004: Missouri Western
- 2004–present: Central Missouri

Head coaching record
- Overall: 848–300 (.739)

Accomplishments and honors

Championships
- NCAA Division II Tournament championship (2018); 4 MIAA regular season championships (1996, 2001, 2013, 2017); 3 MIAA Tournament championships (1997, 1998, 2002); 6 MCC regular season championships

Awards
- 3 MIAA Coach of the Year (1997, 2002, 2018)

David Slifer is an American college women's basketball coach at the University of Central Missouri. During his tenure at Central Missouri, Slifer has led the Jennies to one national championship, four conference regular season championships and eight NCAA tournament appearances. Prior to his current post, Slifer was the head coach for Mid-America Intercollegiate Athletics Association-rival Missouri Western from 1995 to 2004, and was the head coach at his alma mater Mount Mercy University from 1989 to 1995.

== Career ==
=== Mount Mercy University ===
Slifer, a Charleston, Illinois native, began his coaching career at his alma mater Mount Mercy University in 1989. While at Mount Mercy, Slifer led Mount Mercy to six consecutive conference championships, six winning seasons for 28 or more wins, and no more than six losses. With the exception of his first year, Slifer led the Mustangs to the NAIA Tournament finishing in the Final Four during his last two seasons.

=== Missouri Western State College ===
In March 1995, Slifer was announced as the next head coach at Missouri Western State College, an NCAA Division II school competing in the Mid-America Intercollegiate Athletics Association. During his nine seasons at Missouri Western, Slifer led the women's basketball program to two regular season championships, three conference tournament championships, seven NCAA Division II Tournament appearances, and was the MIAA Coach of the Year award in 1997 and 2002. Slifer left after the 2003–04 season.

=== University of Central Missouri ===
In April 2004, Slifer was named the head coach at MIAA-rival Central Missouri State University. During his time at Central Missouri, Slifer has led the Jennies basketball program to two regular season championships, eight NCAA Division II Tournament appearances, and one national championship. Slifer won his third MIAA Coach of the Year Award in 2018.

== Head coach record ==
Record table
Season	Team	Overall	Conference	Standing	Postseason
Mount Mercy Mustangs (Midwest Collegiate Conference) (1989–1995)
1989–90	Mount Mercy	29–5		1st	
1990–91	Mount Mercy	29–5		1st	
1991–92	Mount Mercy	30–5		1st	NAIA Tournament Quarterfinals
1992–93	Mount Mercy	28–5		1st	NAIA Tournament Quarterfinals
1993–94	Mount Mercy	31–4		1st	NAIA Tournament Semifinals
1994–95	Mount Mercy	31–6		1st	NAIA Tournament Final Four
Mount Mercy:		178–30 (.856)			
Missouri Western Griffons (Mid-America Intercollegiate Athletics Association) (1995–2004)
1995–96	Missouri Western	16–12	8–8	7th	
1996–97	Missouri Western	24–7	14–4	1st	NCAA Regionals
1997–98	Missouri Western	23–9	12–4	2nd	NCAA Regionals
1998–99	Missouri Western	25–5	13–3	2nd	NCAA Regionals
1999–2000	Missouri Western	22–9	13–5	3rd	NCAA Regionals
2000–01	Missouri Western	25–7	14–4	3rd	
2001–02	Missouri Western	27–3	16–2	1st	NCAA Regionals
2002–03	Missouri Western	23–8	13–5	3rd	NCAA Regionals
2003–04	Missouri Western	21–9	16–4	4th	NCAA Regionals
Missouri Western:		206–69 (.749)	115–41 (.737)		
Central Missouri Jennies (Mid-America Intercollegiate Athletics Association) (2004–present)
2004–05	Central Missouri State	23–8	13–5	3rd	
2005–06	Central Missouri State	22–10	11–5	3rd	
2006–07	Central Missouri	14–14	7–11	6th	
2007–08	Central Missouri	14–14	9–9	6th	
2008–09	Central Missouri	17–11	12–8	5th	
2009–10	Central Missouri	19–12	13–7	3rd	
2010–11	Central Missouri	16–13	12–10	6th	
2011–12	Central Missouri	20–9	13–7	4th	
2012–13	Central Missouri	24–6	14–4	2nd	
2013–14	Central Missouri	26–5	17–2	1st	
2014–15	Central Missouri	21–9	13–6	5th	
2015–16	Central Missouri	11–18	9–13	10th	
2016–17	Central Missouri	24–7	15–4	2nd	
2017–18	Central Missouri	30–3	18–1	1st	NCAA Champions
2018–19	Central Missouri	25–7	15–4	2nd	NCAA Central Regional Tournament
2019–20	Central Missouri	27–4	18–1	1st	NCAA tournament cancelled due to COVID-19
2020–21	Central Missouri	23–5	19–3	2nd	NCAA Final Four
2021–22	Central Missouri	19–11	15–7	4th	
2022–23	Central Missouri	25–5	19–3	2nd	NCAA First round
2023–24	Central Missouri	21–8	15–7	T-5th	
2024–25	Central Missouri	17–15	8–11	T-7th	
2025–26	Central Missouri	26–7	17–2	1st	NCAA Second round
Central Missouri:		464–201 (.698)	302–130 (.699)		
Total:		848–300 (.739)			
National champion Postseason invitational champion Conference regular season champion Conference regular season and conference tournament champion Division regular season champion Division regular season and conference tournament champion Conference tournament champion

== See also ==
- List of college women's basketball career coaching wins leaders
