= 2014–15 Lafayette Leopards women's basketball team =

Intercollegiate basketball season

2014–15 Lafayette Leopards women's basketball
- Conference: Patriot League
- Record: 14–17 (6–12 Patriot)
- Head coach: Dianne Nolan (5th season)
- Assistant coaches: Theresa Grentz; C.K. Calhoun; Ross James
- Home arena: Kirby Sports Center

2014–15 Patriot League women's basketball standings
	Conf.				Overall
Team	W		L	PCT	W		L	PCT
American†	16	–	2	.889	24	–	8	.750
Army	14	–	4	.778	23	–	8	.742
Holy Cross	11	–	7	.611	15	–	17	.469
Bucknell	10	–	8	.556	18	–	12	.600
Navy	10	–	8	.556	17	–	14	.548
Lehigh	9	–	9	.500	19	–	12	.613
Colgate	7	–	11	.389	9	–	22	.290
Lafayette	6	–	12	.333	14	–	17	.452
Loyola (MD)	5	–	13	.278	7	–	23	.233
Boston University	2	–	16	.111	5	–	25	.167
† 2015 Patriot League tournament winner As of March 19, 2015; Rankings from AP poll

The 2014–15 Lafayette Leopards women's basketball team represented Lafayette College during the 2014–15 NCAA Division I women's basketball season. The Leopards, led by fifth year head coach Dianne Nolan, played their home games at Kirby Sports Center and were members of the Patriot League. They finished the season 14–17, 6–12 in Patriot League play to finish in seventh place. They lost in the quarterfinals of the Patriot League women's tournament to American.

== Roster ==
2014–15 Lafayette Leopards women's basketball team
Players
Coaches

Pos.	#	Name	Height	Year	Previous school	Hometown
G	2	Maddie Peabody	5 ft 5 in (1.65 m)	Sr	Sacred Heart Academy	Louisville, KY
G	5	Brya Freeland	5 ft 5 in (1.65 m)	Sr	Archbishop Spalding	Pasadena, MD
G	11	Anna Ptasinski	5 ft 10 in (1.78 m)	Fr	Regis Jesuit	Highlands Ranch, CO
G	12	Linnel Macklin	5 ft 9 in (1.75 m)	Sr	Bowie	Bowie, MD
G	13	Jamie O'Hare	5 ft 6 in (1.68 m)	Jr	St. Peter's	Staten Island, NY
F	14	Harriet Ottewill-Soulsby	6 ft 3 in (1.91 m)	So	Charnwood College	Loughborough, England
F	15	Emily Homan	6 ft 3 in (1.91 m)	Sr	Delaware County Christian	Upper Darby, PA
G	22	Sammy Stipa	5 ft 5 in (1.65 m)	Fr	Spring-Ford	Royersford, PA
G	23	Maia Hood	5 ft 9 in (1.75 m)	So	Alexander Hamilton	Elmsford, NY
F	33	Annette Snow	5 ft 11 in (1.8 m)	Jr	Blair Academy	Manalapan, NJ
C	42	Ellen Graham	6 ft 2 in (1.88 m)	Fr	Lincoln-Way North	Frankford, IL
F	43	Ashley Lutz	6 ft 1 in (1.85 m)	Fr	Lincoln Sudbury	Sudbury, MA

Head coach

- Dianne Nolan

Assistant coach(es)

- Theresa Grentz
- C.K. Calhoun
- Ross James

Legend

- (C) Team captain
- (S) Suspended
- (I) Ineligible
- (W) Walk-on
- Injured
- Current redshirt

Roster

== Schedule ==
Date time, TV	Rank^{#}	Opponent^{#}	Result	Record	Site (attendance) city, state
Exhibition
11/05/2014*; 7:00 pm		Bloomsburg (PA)	W 65–49	–	Kirby Sports Center (N/A); Easton, PA
Non-conference regular season
11/14/2014*; 7:00 pm		Delaware	W 63–52	1–0	Kirby Sports Center (547); Easton, PA
11/19/2014*; 7:00 pm		at Columbia	L 65–72	1–1	Levien Gymnasium (N/A); New York City, NY
11/23/2014*; 2:00 pm, WBPH		Hartford	W 74–59	2–1	Kirby Sports Center (577); Easton, PA
11/25/2014*; 7:00 pm		at Rider	W 66–48	3–1	Alumni Gymnasium (301); Lawrenceville, NJ
11/28/2014*; 7:00 pm		at No. 12 Louisville	L 61–102	3–2	KFC Yum! Center (7,923); Louisville, KY
12/02/2014*; 7:00 pm, WBPH		Penn	W 60–57	4–2	Kirby Sports Center (462); Easton, PA
12/05/2014*; 7:00 pm		at St. Francis Brooklyn	W 73–51	5–2	Generoso Pope Athletic Complex (N/A); Brooklyn, NY
12/07/2014*; 2:00 pm		at Seton Hall	L 63–80	5–3	Walsh Gymnasium (491); South Orange, NJ
12/18/2014*; 7:00 pm		at Stony Brook	L 58–60	5–4	Island Federal Credit Union Arena (401); Stony Brook, NY
12/21/2014*; 2:00 pm, WBPH		NJIT	W 66–50	6–4	Kirby Sports Center (432); Easton, PA
12/28/2014*; 2:00 pm		at Saint Peter's	W 49–34	7–4	Yanitelli Center (121); Jersey City, NJ
Patriot League Regular season
12/31/2014; 2:00 pm, WBPH		Army	W 71–60	8–4 (1–0)	Kirby Sports Center (873); Easton, PA
01/03/2015; 7:00 pm		at Navy	L 52–65	8–5 (1–1)	Alumni Hall (488); Annapolis, MD
01/07/2015; 7:00 pm, WBPH		Bucknell	L 71–77	8–6 (1–2)	Kirby Sports Center (371); Easton, PA
01/10/2015; 2:00 pm, WBPH		Boston University	W 67–60	9–6 (2–2)	Kirby Sports Center (578); Easton, PA
01/14/2015; 11:30 am		at Loyola (MD)	W 57–49	10–6 (3–2)	Reitz Arena (1,753); Baltimore, MD
01/17/2015; 2:00 pm		at American	L 44–63	10–7 (3–3)	Bender Arena (759); Washington, D.C.
01/21/2015; 11:30 am, WBPH		Holy Cross	L 46–64	10–8 (3–4)	Kirby Sports Center (258); Easton, PA
01/25/2015; 1:00 pm, ASN		at Lehigh	L 60–65	10–9 (3–5)	Stabler Arena (371); Bethlehem, PA
01/28/2015; 7:00 pm, WBPH		Colgate	W 58–56	11–9 (4–5)	Kirby Sports Center (248); Easton, PA
01/31/2015; 2:00 pm, WBPH		Navy	L 60–65	11–10 (4–6)	Kirby Sports Center (673); Easton, PA
02/04/2015; 7:00 pm		at Bucknell	L 37–51	11–11 (4–7)	Sojka Pavilion (448); Lewisburg, PA
02/07/2015; 2:00 pm		at Boston University	L 49–56	11–12 (4–8)	Case Gym (N/A); Boston, MA
02/11/2015; 7:00 pm, WBPH		Loyola (MD)	W 69–63	12–12 (5–8)	Kirby Sports Center (573); Easton, PA
02/14/2015; 2:00 pm, WBPH		American	L 58–74	12–13 (5–9)	Kirby Sports Center (514); Easton, PA
02/18/2015; 7:00 pm		at Holy Cross	L 53–59	12–14 (5–10)	Hart Center (877); Worcester, MA
02/21/2015; 2:00 pm, WBPH		Lehigh	W 59–51	13–14 (6–10)	Kirby Sports Center (673); Easton, PA
02/25/2015; 7:00 pm		at Colgate	L 36–49	13–15 (6–11)	Cotterell Court (248); Hamilton, NY
02/28/2015; 3:00 pm		at Army	L 41–57	13–16 (6–12)	Christl Arena (952); West Point, NY
Patriot League Women's Tournament
03/04/2014; 7:00 pm		Loyola (MD); First Round	W 58–46	14–16	Kirby Sports Center (692); Easton, PA
03/06/2014; 7:00 pm		at American; Quarterfinals	L 56–79	14–17	Bender Arena (319); Washington, D.C.
*Non-conference game. ^{#}Rankings from AP poll. (#) Tournament seedings in parentheses. All times are in Eastern Time.

== See also ==
- 2014–15 Lafayette Leopards men's basketball team
