= 2014–15 Holy Cross Crusaders women's basketball team =

Intercollegiate basketball season

2014–15 Holy Cross Crusaders women's basketball
- Conference: Patriot League
- Record: 15–17 (11–7 Patriot)
- Head coach: Bill Gibbons (30th season)
- Assistant coaches: Ann McInerney; Matt Raquet; Kindyll Dorsey
- Home arena: Hart Center

2014–15 Patriot League women's basketball standings
	Conf.				Overall
Team	W		L	PCT	W		L	PCT
American†	16	–	2	.889	24	–	8	.750
Army	14	–	4	.778	23	–	8	.742
Holy Cross	11	–	7	.611	15	–	17	.469
Bucknell	10	–	8	.556	18	–	12	.600
Navy	10	–	8	.556	17	–	14	.548
Lehigh	9	–	9	.500	19	–	12	.613
Colgate	7	–	11	.389	9	–	22	.290
Lafayette	6	–	12	.333	14	–	17	.452
Loyola (MD)	5	–	13	.278	7	–	23	.233
Boston University	2	–	16	.111	5	–	25	.167
† 2015 Patriot League tournament winner As of March 19, 2015; Rankings from AP poll

The 2014–15 Holy Cross Crusaders women's basketball team represented the College of the Holy Cross during the 2014–15 NCAA Division I women's basketball season. The Crusaders, led by thirty-year head coach Bill Gibbons, played their home games at the Hart Center and were members of the Patriot League. They finished the season 15–17, with an 11–7 record in Patriot League play to finish in third place. They lost in the quarterfinals of the Patriot League women's tournament, where Lehigh defeated them.

== Roster ==
2014–15 Holy Cross Crusaders women's basketball team
Players
Coaches

Pos.	#	Name	Height	Year	Previous school	Hometown
G	3	Infiniti Thomas-Waheed	5 ft 10 in (1.78 m)	Fr	Newton North	Newton, MA
G	4	Tricia Byrne	5 ft 7 in (1.7 m)	Fr	Scranton Prep	Dunmore, PA
G	5	Katie Doherty	5 ft 10 in (1.78 m)	Fr	Sachem East	Holbrook, NY
G	11	Shannon Druck	5 ft 8 in (1.73 m)	Fr	Susquehannock	New Freedom, PA
G	12	Lisa Mifsud	5 ft 7 in (1.7 m)	Jr	Villa Maria Academy	Erie, PA
G/F	15	Madelyn Ganser	5 ft 11 in (1.8 m)	So	Needham	Needham, MA
G	24	Kate Gillespie	5 ft 8 in (1.73 m)	Jr	Georgetown Visitation	Washington, D.C.
F	25	Clare Sullivan	6 ft 3 in (1.91 m)	Sr	Rivers	Belmont, MA
F	31	Raquel Scott	6 ft 0 in (1.83 m)	Jr	Immaculate Heart Academy	Ridgewood, NJ
G/F	32	Jenn Dynis	5 ft 11 in (1.8 m)	So	Visitation Academy	St. Louis, MO
C	40	Molly Hourigan	6 ft 4 in (1.93 m)	Jr	Jordan-Elbridge	Memphis, NY
F	41	Amy Hasenauer	6 ft 2 in (1.88 m)	Fr	Hilton	Greece, NY
F	50	Emily Parker	6 ft 2 in (1.88 m)	Sr	Johnston	Johnston, IA

Head coach

- Bill Gibbons

Assistant coach(es)

- Ann McInerney
- Matt Raquet
- Kindyll Dorsey

Legend

- (C) Team captain
- (S) Suspended
- (I) Ineligible
- (W) Walk-on
- Injured
- Current redshirt

Roster

== Schedule ==
Date time, TV	Rank^{#}	Opponent^{#}	Result	Record	Site (attendance) city, state
Regular season
11/16/2014*; 2:00 pm		Manhattan	L 60–66	0–1	Hart Center (453); Worcester, MA
11/18/2014*; 7:00 pm		at Yale	L 70–83	0–2	John J. Lee Amphitheater (152); New Haven, CT
11/20/2014*; 7:00 pm		at Dartmouth	L 53–69	0–3	Leede Arena (419); Hanover, NH
11/23/2014*; 5:00 pm		at No. 3 Notre Dame; Hall of Fame Women's Challenge	L 29–104	0–4	Edmund P. Joyce Center (8,684); South Bend, IN
11/24/2014*; 8:00 pm		vs. Quinnipiac; Hall of Fame Women's Challenge	L 67–74	0–5	Edmund P. Joyce Center (8,566); South Bend, IN
11/25/2014*; 8:00 pm		vs. Harvard; Hall of Fame Women's Challenge	L 76–79 ^{OT}	0–6	Edmund P. Joyce Center (8,429); South Bend, IN
11/30/2014*; 3:00 pm		vs. Georgetown; Hall of Fame Women's Challenge	W 73–69	1–6	Mohegan Sun Arena (2,307); Uncasville, CT
12/03/2014*; 5:00 pm		at Bryant	L 68–74	1–7	Chace Athletic Center (394); Smithfield, RI
12/10/2014*; 7:00 pm, WCTR		Boston College	W 80–64	2–7	Hart Center (867); Worcester, MA
12/14/2014*; 2:00 pm		at Massachusetts	L 61–72	2–8	Mullins Center (311); Amherst, MA
12/22/2014*; 11:15 am		UMass Lowell	W 78–63	3–8	Hart Center (2,824); Worcester, MA
12/28/2014*; 12:00 pm		vs. Norfolk State; Seawolves Holiday Classic	W 63–62	4–8	Island Federal Credit Union Arena (796); Stony Brook, NY
12/29/2014*; 12:00 pm		vs. Western Michigan; Seawolves Holiday Classic	L 40–51	4–9	Island Federal Credit Union Arena (682); Stony Brook, NY
12/31/2014; 2:00 pm		at Boston University	W 71–48	5–9 (1–0)	Case Gym (203); Boston, MA
01/03/2015; 1:00 pm		American	L 63–74	5–10 (1–1)	Hart Center (873); Worcester, MA
01/07/2015; 7:00 pm		Colgate	L 71–76	5–11 (1–2)	Hart Center (574); Worcester, MA
01/10/2015; 2:00 pm		at Bucknell	W 53–52	6–11 (2–2)	Sojka Pavilion (588); Lewisburg, PA
01/14/2015; 7:00 pm		at Army	L 53–67	6–12 (2–3)	Christl Arena (536); West Point, NY
01/17/2015; 1:00 pm		Lehigh	L 60–66	6–13 (2–4)	Hart Center (797); Worcester, MA
01/21/2015; 11:30 am		at Lafayette	W 64–46	7–13 (3–4)	Kirby Sports Center (258); Easton, PA
01/24/2015; 2:00 pm		at Navy	W 60–44	8–13 (4–4)	Alumni Hall (507); Annapolis, MD
01/29/2015; 7:00 pm		Loyola (MD)	L 51–57	8–14 (4–5)	Hart Center (523); Worcester, MA
01/31/2015; 2:00 pm		at American	W 67–61	9–14 (5–5)	Bender Arena (578); Washington, D.C.
02/04/2015; 7:00 pm, TWCSC		at Colgate	W 68–62	10–14 (6–5)	Cotterell Court (617); Hamilton, NY
02/07/2015; 2:00 pm		Bucknell	W 69–61	11–14 (7–5)	Hart Center (1,253); Worcester, MA
02/11/2015; 7:00 pm, WCTR		Army	L 51–53	11–15 (7–6)	Hart Center (956); Worcester, MA
02/14/2015; 2:00 pm, SE2		at Lehigh	L 58–71	11–16 (7–7)	Stabler Arena (1,159); Bethlehem, PA
02/18/2015; 7:00 pm		Lafayette	W 59–53	12–16 (8–7)	Hart Center (877); Worcester, MA
02/21/2015; 1:00 pm		Navy	W 48–44	13–16 (9–7)	Hart Center (1,056); Worcester, MA
02/25/2015; 8:00 pm		at Loyola (MD)	W 65–37	14–16 (10–7)	Reitz Arena (297); Baltimore, MD
02/28/2015; 1:00 pm		Boston University	W 76–62	15–16 (11–7)	Hart Center (946); Worcester, MA
Patriot League Women's Tournament
03/06/2015; 6:00 pm		Lehigh; Quarterfinals	L 62–75	15–17	Hart Center (357); Worcester, MA
*Non-conference game. ^{#}Rankings from AP Poll. (#) Tournament seedings in parentheses. All times are in Eastern Time.

== See also ==
2014–15 Holy Cross Crusaders men's basketball team
