= Lone Star Conference women's basketball tournament =

- Conference basketball championship
- Sport: Basketball
- Conference: Lone Star Conference
- Number of teams: 8
- Format: Single-elimination tournament
- Played: 1983–present
- Current champion: Texas Woman's (4th)
- Most championships: West Texas A&M (16)
- Official website: Lone Star women's basketball

Host locations
- Frisco, TX (2018–2020, 2022–present); Allen, TX (2012–2017); Bartlesville, OK (2008–2011); Campus Sites (1975–2011, 2021)

The Lone Star Conference women's basketball tournament is the annual conference women's basketball championship tournament for the Lone Star Conference. The tournament has been held annually since 1983. It is a single-elimination tournament and seeding is based on regular season records.

The winner receives the Lone Star Conference's automatic bid to the NCAA Division II women's basketball tournament.

== Results ==
Year	Champions	Score	Runner-up	Venue
1983	Abilene Christian	55–53	Texas A&I	Nacogdoches, TX
1984	Howard Payne	53–51	Sam Houston State	Commerce, TX
1985	Abilene Christian	70–50	Howard Payne	Abilene, TX
1986	Abilene Christian	102–56	Angelo State	Abilene, TX
1987	West Texas State	98–60	Abilene Christian	Canyon, TX
1988	West Texas State	82–53	Abilene Christian	Canyon, TX
1989	West Texas State	72–58	Abilene Christian	Canyon, TX
1990	West Texas State	78–50	Texas Woman's	Canyon, TX
1991	West Texas State	86–52	Eastern New Mexico	Canyon, TX
1992	Central Oklahoma	87–85	Abilene Christian	Abilene, TX
1993	Abilene Christian	90–79	Eastern New Mexico	Abilene, TX
1994	Angelo State	79–69	Abilene Christian	San Angelo, TX
1995	West Texas A&M	74–68	Abilene Christian	Canyon, TX
1996	Abilene Christian	82–60	West Texas A&M	Canyon, TX
1997	West Texas A&M	59–56	Abilene Christian	Canyon, TX
1998	Abilene Christian	76–54	Harding	Abilene, TX
1999	Abilene Christian	70–57	West Texas A&M	Canyon, TX
2000	Texas A&M–Kingsville	82–67	West Texas A&M	Kingsville, TX
2001	Midwestern State	65–61	Southeastern Oklahoma	Wichita Falls, TX
2002	Angelo State	82–67	Midwestern State	San Angelo, TX
2003	Northeastern State	82–68	West Texas A&M	Tahlequah, OK
2004	Angelo State	78–63	Northeastern State	Canyon, TX
2005	Angelo State	61–49	Northeastern State	Tahlequah, OK
2006	West Texas A&M	83–68	Angelo State	Canyon, TX
2007	Texas A&M–Commerce	81–71	West Texas A&M	Commerce, TX
2008	West Texas A&M	85–73	Central Oklahoma	Bartlesville, OK
2009	West Texas A&M	66–59	Central Oklahoma	Bartlesville, OK
2010	West Texas A&M	66–59	Northeastern State	Bartlesville, OK
2011	Texas Woman's	74–73	Central Oklahoma	Bartlesville, OK
2012	Tarleton State	48–44	Incarnate Word	Allen, TX
2013	Midwestern State	85–83 (OT)	West Texas A&M	Allen, TX
2014	West Texas A&M	73–67	Tarleton State	Allen, TX
2015	West Texas A&M	73–70	Midwestern State	Allen, TX
2016	Angelo State	68–65 (2OT)	West Texas A&M	Allen, TX
2017	Tarleton State	80–78	Angelo State	Allen, TX
2018	West Texas A&M	80–66	Tarleton State	Frisco, TX
2019	West Texas A&M	71–55	Angelo State	Frisco, TX
2020	Lubbock Christian	57–44	Texas A&M–Commerce	Frisco, TX
2021	Lubbock Christian	78–57	Texas A&M–Commerce	Lubbock, TX
2022	West Texas A&M	67–66	Texas A&M–Commerce	Frisco, TX
2023	Angelo State	63–62	Texas Woman's	Frisco, TX
2024	Texas Woman's	70–60	UT Permian Basin	Frisco, TX
2025	Texas Woman's	73-66 (OT)	Lubbock Christian	Frisco, TX
2026	Texas Woman's	54–46	West Texas A&M	Frisco, TX

== Championship records ==
School School	Finals Record	Finals Appearances	Years
West Texas A&M (West Texas State)	16–8	24	1987, 1988, 1989, 1990, 1991, 1995, 1997, 2006, 2008, 2009, 2010, 2014, 2015, 2018, 2019, 2022
Abilene Christian	7–7	14	1983, 1985, 1986, 1993, 1996, 1998, 1999
Angelo State	6–4	10	1994, 2002, 2004, 2005, 2016, 2023
Texas Woman's	4–2	6	2011, 2024, 2025, 2026
Tarleton State	2–2	4	2012, 2017
Midwestern State	2–2	4	2001, 2013
Lubbock Christian	2–1	3	2020, 2021
Texas A&M–Commerce (East Texas State; now East Texas A&M)	1–3	4	2007
Northeastern State (OK)	1–3	4	2003
Texas A&M–Kingsville (Texas A&I)	1–1	2	2000
Central Oklahoma (Central State)	1–3	4	1992
Howard Payne	1–1	2	1984
Eastern New Mexico	0–2	2	
UT Permian Basin	0–1	1	
Sam Houston State (Sam Houston)	0–1	1	
Harding	0–1	1	
Southeastern Oklahoma State	0–1	1	
Incarnate Word	0–1	1	

- Arkansas–Fort Smith, Cameron, Dallas Baptist, Oklahoma Christian, St. Edward's, St. Mary's (TX), Texas A&M International, UT Tyler, and Western New Mexico have yet to qualify for the tournament finals. Sul Ross State left the LSC in 1976, before the women's tournament was established, and did not return to the conference until the 2024–25 season.
- East Central, Ouachita Baptist, Southwest Texas State (now Texas State), Southwestern Oklahoma State, and Stephen F. Austin never qualified for the tournament finals as Lone Star Conference members.
- Schools highlighted in pink are former members of the Lone Star Conference

== See also ==
- Lone Star Conference men's basketball tournament
