= Joanne Bracker =

American basketball coach (1945–2023)

Joanne Bracker (May 3, 1945 – February 1, 2023) was an American college basketball coach. Bracker taught basketball during the late 1960s before becoming the women's basketball coach for Midland University in 1970. With the Midland Warriors, Bracker appeared multiple times at the NAIA Women's Basketball Championships for Division I and Division II between the 1980s to 2000s. Bracker's best performance with the team as head coach was a fourth-place finish at the 1985 Division I championship.

Bracker continued to coach with Midland until her retirement in 2012. After her retirement, Bracker held the record for most wins ever for a NAIA women's basketball coach with 736 wins and 403 losses. Apart from Midland, Bracker was a committee member that picked American women's basketball players for the 1991 Pan American Games, 1992 Summer Olympics, and 1996 Summer Olympics. Bracker was inducted into the National Association of Intercollegiate Athletics Hall of Fame in 1996 and the Women's Basketball Hall of Fame in 1999.

== Early life and education ==
In the mid-1940s, Bracker was born in Mondamin, Iowa. Bracker began playing basketball as a forward during high school and was on the starting lineup for two years. For her post-secondary education, Bracker continued playing basketball at Dana College and graduated with physical education and English majors in 1966. She continued her education with a master's degree from the University of Northern Colorado in 1970.

== Career ==
During the late 1960s, Bracker taught physical education for children in Omaha, Nebraska, and Casper, Wyoming, before becoming an assistant for the women's basketball team at Northern Colorado. In 1970, Bracker turned down a field hockey coaching position at Iowa State for a women's basketball coaching position at Midland University. Between the 1980s to 2000s, the Midland Warriors appeared multiple times at the NAIA Women's Basketball Championships for Division I and Division II while Bracker was their head coach. Their best performance during this time period was a fourth-place finish at the 1985 Division I championship.

In 2012, Bracker held the record for the most ever wins as a women's basketball coach in the NAIA when she retired with 736 wins and 403 losses. While coaching, Bracker was an instructor in physical education with Midland before becoming an assistant professor in 1974. After her retirement, Bracker continued teaching physical education with Midland. Outside of Midland, Bracker was one of the committee members that selected American women's basketball competitors for the 1991 Pan American Games, 1992 Summer Olympics, and 1996 Summer Olympics.

== Awards and honors ==
In the early 1980s, Bracker was named into athletic halls of fame by Dana College and Midland University. Apart from individual schools, Bracker was named into the National Association of Intercollegiate Athletics Hall of Fame in 1996. A few years later, she was inducted into the Women's Basketball Hall of Fame upon its establishment in 1999.

== Personal life and death ==
Bracker was married and had a child. She died on February 1, 2023, at the age of 77.

== See also ==
- List of college women's basketball career coaching wins leaders
