= Nancy Funk =

American basketball coach (1951–2018)

Nancy Wickert Funk (April 27, 1951 – February 6, 2018) was an American basketball coach. Funk retired from Johns Hopkins in April 2017 with a record of 537–264 over 31 years as coach. At the time of her retirement, she was the winningest coach in program history and ranked eighth in NCAA Division III history in career victories.

== Early life and education ==
Funk was born on April 27, 1951, to parents John D. Wickert and Madelyn G. Smith in Allentown, Pennsylvania. She remained in Allentown until grade three when her family moved to Philadelphia. From there, she graduated from Central Dauphin High School before enrolling in Messiah University for a degree in nursing and a minor in biology.

== Career ==
Only a year after graduating, Funk left the nursing field to coach a middle school basketball team and eventually reached the collegiate level. She returned to her alma mater and spent nine years coaching their women's basketball team to a 126–89 record. As a result of her success, she was recruited to coach the Johns Hopkins University women's basketball team by athletic director Bob Scott. In her first year as coach in 1986, Funk's team won only four games. Within three years, she led the team to a 12–10 record, the best season they had at the time. Following this, Funk guided Hopkins to .500 or above for 27 straight seasons from 1988–89 to 2014–15. Funk earned her 650th career win when the Blue Jays concluded the 2015–16 season with a 76–55 win over Washington College. She was subsequently inducted into the Blue Jays Hall of Fame in 2015. Two years later, Funk was named the Centennial Conference Coach of the Year for the second time since 2011.

Funk retired from Johns Hopkins in April 2017 with a record of 537–264 over 31 years as coach. At the time of her retirement, she was the winningest coach in program history and ranked eighth in NCAA Division III history in career victories. Following her retirement, Funk died on February 6, 2018, due to cancer.

== See also ==
- List of college women's basketball career coaching wins leaders
