= 2014–15 Bucknell Bison women's basketball team =

Intercollegiate basketball season

2014–15 Bucknell Bison women's basketball
- Conference: Patriot League
- Record: 18–12 (10–8 Patriot)
- Head coach: Aaron Roussell (3rd season)
- Assistant coaches: Katie Adams; Mike Lane; LaTonya Watson
- Home arena: Sojka Pavilion

2014–15 Patriot League women's basketball standings
	Conf.				Overall
Team	W		L	PCT	W		L	PCT
American†	16	–	2	.889	24	–	8	.750
Army	14	–	4	.778	23	–	8	.742
Holy Cross	11	–	7	.611	15	–	17	.469
Bucknell	10	–	8	.556	18	–	12	.600
Navy	10	–	8	.556	17	–	14	.548
Lehigh	9	–	9	.500	19	–	12	.613
Colgate	7	–	11	.389	9	–	22	.290
Lafayette	6	–	12	.333	14	–	17	.452
Loyola (MD)	5	–	13	.278	7	–	23	.233
Boston University	2	–	16	.111	5	–	25	.167
† 2015 Patriot League tournament winner As of March 19, 2015; Rankings from AP poll

The 2014–15 Lafayette Leopards women's basketball team represented Bucknell University during the 2014–15 NCAA Division I women's basketball season. The Bison, led by fourth-year head coach Aaron Roussell, played their home games at Sojka Pavilion and were members of the Patriot League. They finished the season 18–12, 10–8 in Patriot League play to finish in a tie for fourth place. They lost in the quarterfinals of the Patriot League women's tournament to Navy. Despite having 18 wins, they were not invited to a postseason tournament.

== Roster ==
2014–15 Bucknell Bison women's basketball team
Players	Coaches
3 Tyler Craig G 5-8 Jr. Columbus, Ohio (St. Francis DeSales); 4 Claire Maree O'Bryan G 5-10 Jr. Darwin, Australia (The Hill School (Pa.)); 10 Julia Gnieser G 5-6 Fr. Dix Hills, N.Y. (Half Hollow Hills East); 11 Megan McGurk G 5-7 So. West Chester, Pa. (Academy of Notre Dame); 12 Claire DeBoer F 6-1 So. Grosse Pointe, Mich. (Grosse Pointe South); 13 Jorden Sneed G 5-6 So. Chatsworth, Calif. (Sierra Canyon); 21 Jacquie Klotz G 6-0 Fr. West Windsor, N.J. (The Lawrenceville School); 23 Tara Wilk G 5-5 Sr. Washington, N.J. (Immaculate Heart Academy); 31 Katherine Harris G 5-6 Sr. Derry, N.H. (Pinkerton Academy); 32 Catherine Romaine F 6-2 Fr. Chapel Hill, N.C. (Chapel Hill); 33 Carly Richardson G 5-11 Fr. Palmyra, Pa. (Palmyra); 34 Sheaira Jones G 5-9 Jr. Cincinnati, Ohio (Colerain); 35 Micki Impellizeri F 6-3 Sr. Seaford, N.Y. (St. Anthony's); 41 Sune Swart F 6-3 So. Franklin, Pa. (Cranberry); 44 Audrey Dotson F 6-1 Sr. Vienna, Va. (Flint Hill School); Pos. / # / Name / Height / Year / Previous school / Hometown	Head coach: Aaron Roussell; Assistant coach(es): Katie Adams; Mike Lane; LaTonya Watson; Legend: (C) Team captain; (S) Suspended; (I) Ineligible; (W) Walk-on; Injured; Current redshirt; Roster

== Schedule ==
Date time, TV	Rank^{#}	Opponent^{#}	Result	Record	Site (attendance) city, state
Non-conference regular season
11/14/2014*; 6:00 pm		at Bowling Green	W 53–52	1–0	Stroh Center (1,476); Bowling Green, OH
11/16/2014*; 2:00 pm		at Michigan	L 61–68	1–1	Crisler Arena (1,913); Ann Arbor, MI
11/22/2014*; 2:00 pm		at Fairleigh Dickinson	W 61–60 ^{OT}	2–1	Rothman Center (312); Hackensack, NJ
11/25/2014*; 7:00 pm, ESPN3		at Youngstown State	L 54–69	2–2	Beeghly Center (1,093); Youngstown, OH
11/29/2014*; 2:00 pm		Cornell	W 59–51	3–2	Sojka Pavilion (572); Lewisburg, PA
12/03/2014*; 7:00 pm		Morgan State	W 79–50	4–2	Sojka Pavilion (465); Lewisburg, PA
12/07/2014*; 3:00 pm		at Delaware	L 56–58	4–3	Bob Carpenter Center (1,734); Newark, DE
12/09/2014*; 7:00 pm		UMBC	W 85–41	5–3	Sojka Pavilion (426); Lewisburg, PA
12/19/2014*; 4:30 pm		Yale	W 73–66	6–3	Sojka Pavilion (531); Lewisburg, PA
12/21/2014*; 1:00 pm		at Mount St. Mary's	W 74–49	7–3	Knott Arena (347); Emmitsburg, MD
12/28/2014*; 2:00 pm		at Binghamton	W 67–58	8–3	Binghamton University Events Center (1,153); Vestal, NY
Patriot regular season
12/31/2014; 12:00 pm		American	L 55–60	8–4 (0–1)	Sojka Pavilion (526); Lewisburg, PA
01/03/2015; 2:00 pm		Colgate	W 77–75 ^{OT}	9–4 (1–1)	Sojka Pavilion (358); Lewisburg, PA
01/07/2015; 7:00 pm		at Lafayette	W 77–71	10–4 (2–1)	Kirby Sports Center (371); Easton, PA
01/10/2015; 2:00 pm		Holy Cross	L 52–53	10–5 (2–2)	Sojka Pavilion (588); Lewisburg, PA
01/14/2015; 7:00 pm		Navy	W 44–42 ^{OT}	11–5 (3–2)	Alumni Hall (1,123); Annapolis, MD
01/18/2015; 3:00 pm		at Army	L 45–67	11–6 (3–3)	Christl Arena (620); West Point, NY
01/21/2015; 7:00 pm		Loyola (MD)	W 66–49	12–6 (4–3)	Sojka Pavilion (302); Lewisburg, PA
01/24/2015; 2:00 pm		Boston University	W 72–56	13–6 (5–3)	Sojka Pavilion (442); Lewisburg, PA
01/28/2015; 7:00 pm		at Lehigh	L 61–76	13–7 (5–4)	Stabler Arena (543); Bethlehem, PA
01/31/2015; 4:00 pm		at Colgate	L 41–54	13–8 (5–5)	Cotterell Court (783); Hamilton, NY
02/04/2015; 7:00 pm		Lafayette	W 51–37	14–8 (6–5)	Sojka Pavilion (783); Lewisburg, PA
02/07/2015; 2:00 pm		at Holy Cross	L 61–69	14–9 (6–6)	Hart Center (1,253); Worcester, MA
02/11/2015; 7:00 pm		Navy	W 51–50	15–9 (7–6)	Sojka Pavilion (371); Lewisburg, PA
02/15/2015; 2:00 pm, CBSSN		Army	L 46–50	15–10 (7–7)	Sojka Pavilion (929); Lewisburg, PA
02/18/2015; 7:00 pm		Loyola (MD)	W 72–61	16–10 (8–7)	Reitz Arena (127); Baltimore, MD
02/21/2015; 1:00 pm		at Boston University	W 65–60	17–10 (9–7)	Case Gym (236); Boston, MA
02/25/2015; 7:00 pm		Lehigh	W 69–61	18–10 (10–7)	Sojka Pavilion (389); Lewisburg, PA
02/28/2015; 4:00 pm		at American	L 55–65	18–11 (10–8)	Bender Arena (717); Washington, D.C.
Patriot League Women's Tournament
03/06/2015; 7:00 pm		Navy; Quarterfinals	L 49–60	18–12	Sojka Pavilion (495); Lewisburg, PA
*Non-conference game. ^{#}Rankings from AP Poll. (#) Tournament seedings in parentheses. All times are in Eastern Time.

== See also ==
- 2014–15 Bucknell Bison men's basketball team
