= 2014–15 Lehigh Mountain Hawks women's basketball team =

Intercollegiate basketball season

2014–15 Lehigh Mountain Hawks women's basketball
- Conference: Patriot League
- Record: 19–12 (9–9 Patriot)
- Head coach: Sue Troyan (20th season)
- Assistant coaches: Glenn Rigney; Caitlin Gillard; Rachel Roberts
- Home arena: Stabler Arena

2014–15 Patriot League women's basketball standings
	Conf.				Overall
Team	W		L	PCT	W		L	PCT
American†	16	–	2	.889	24	–	8	.750
Army	14	–	4	.778	23	–	8	.742
Holy Cross	11	–	7	.611	15	–	17	.469
Bucknell	10	–	8	.556	18	–	12	.600
Navy	10	–	8	.556	17	–	14	.548
Lehigh	9	–	9	.500	19	–	12	.613
Colgate	7	–	11	.389	9	–	22	.290
Lafayette	6	–	12	.333	14	–	17	.452
Loyola (MD)	5	–	13	.278	7	–	23	.233
Boston University	2	–	16	.111	5	–	25	.167
† 2015 Patriot League tournament winner As of March 19, 2015; Rankings from AP poll

The 2014–15 Lehigh Mountain Hawks women's basketball team represented Lehigh University during the 2014–15 NCAA Division I women's basketball season. The Mountain Hawks, led by twentieth year head coach Sue Troyan, played their home games at Stabler Arena and were members of the Patriot League. They finished the season 19–12, 9–9 in Patriot League play to finish in sixth place. They advanced to the championship game of the Patriot League women's tournament where they lost to American. Despite having 19 wins, they were not invited to a postseason tournament.

== Roster ==
2014–15 Lehigh Mountain Hawks women's basketball team
Players
Coaches

Pos.	#	Name	Height	Year	Previous school	Hometown
G	5	Elizabeth Jordan	5 ft 10 in (1.78 m)	Jr	Hononegah Community HS	Roscoe, IL
G/F	10	Kiernan McCloskey	6 ft 1 in (1.85 m)	So	Germantown Academy	Lower Gwynedd, PA
G	11	Taylor Campbell	5 ft 9 in (1.75 m)	Fr	Marquette HS	Chesterfield, MO
G	12	Lexi Martins	6 ft 0 in (1.83 m)	So	Irvington HS	Irvington, NY
G	14	Sarah Williams	5 ft 9 in (1.75 m)	Sr	Fenwick HS	Chicago, IL
G	15	Bernadette Devaney	5 ft 8 in (1.73 m)	Fr	Nova HS	Cooper City, FL
G	20	Quinci Mann	5 ft 10 in (1.78 m)	Fr	St. Ignatius Prep	San Francisco, CA
F	22	Elizabeth Sharlow	6 ft 2 in (1.88 m)	Jr	Bishop George Ahr HS	Edison, NJ
G	23	Kari Moffat	5 ft 6 in (1.68 m)	So	Adlai E. Stevenson HS	Lincolnshire, IL
G	25	Kayla Burton	5 ft 8 in (1.73 m)	So	Newton South HS	Newton, MA
G/F	30	Katie O'Reilly	5 ft 11 in (1.8 m)	Sr	St. John Vianney HS	Colts Neck, NJ
F	34	Kerry Kinek	6 ft 3 in (1.91 m)	Jr	Allentown Central Catholic HS	Whitehall, PA
G	35	Amina Affini	6 ft 0 in (1.83 m)	Jr	Wilmington HS	Wilmington, OH
F	44	Mae Williams	6 ft 0 in (1.83 m)	Fr	Monarch HS	Lafayette, OH

Head coach

- Sue Troyan

Assistant coach(es)

- Glenn Rigney
- Caitlin Gillard
- Rachel Roberts

Legend

- (C) Team captain
- (S) Suspended
- (I) Ineligible
- (W) Walk-on
- Injured
- Current redshirt

Roster

== Schedule ==
Date time, TV	Rank^{#}	Opponent^{#}	Result	Record	Site (attendance) city, state
Non-conference regular season
11/15/2014*; 7:00 pm		at Monmouth	W 82–70	1–0	Multipurpose Activity Center (730); West Long Branch, NJ
11/15/2014*; 7:00 pm		East Stroudsburg	W 77–53	2–0	Stabler Arena (694); Bethlehem, PA
11/21/2014*; 7:00 pm		at NJIT	W 74–54	3–0	Fleisher Center (334); Newark, NJ
11/25/2014*; 7:00 pm		at Saint Peter's	W 70–58	4–0	Yanitelli Center (214); Jersey City, NJ
11/30/2014*; 1:00 pm		at Sacred Heart	W 85–77	5–0	William H. Pitt Center (N/A); Fairfield, CT
12/02/2014*; 11:00 am		Hampton	W 85–67	6–0	Stabler Arena (4,078); Bethlehem, PA
12/04/2014*; 7:00 pm		at Saint Joseph's	W 73–71	7–0	Hagan Arena (612); Philadelphia, PA
12/20/2014*; 3:00 pm		at Arizona State; ASU Classic semifinals	L 61–81	7–1	Wells Fargo Arena (1,189); Tempe, AZ
12/21/2014*; 2:00 pm		vs. Eastern Illinois; ASU Classic 3rd place game	W 72–69	8–1	Wells Fargo Arena (N/A); Tempe, AZ
12/28/2014*; 2:00 pm		Duquesne	L 75–82	8–2	Stabler Arena (732); Bethlehem, PA
Patriot League Regular season
12/31/2014; 2:00 pm		at Colgate	W 86–68	9–2 (1–0)	Cotterell Court (442); Hamilton, NY
01/03/2015; 2:00 pm		Boston University	W 85–64	10–2 (2–0)	Stabler Arena (649); Bethlehem, PA
01/07/2015; 7:00 pm		Army	W 63–51	11–2 (3–0)	Stabler Arena (668); Bethlehem, PA
01/10/2015; 2:00 pm		at Loyola (MD)	L 52–64	11–3 (3–1)	Reitz Arena (178); Baltimore, MD
01/14/2015; 7:00 pm		American	L 73–75 ^{OT}	11–4 (3–2)	Stabler Arena (671); Bethlehem, PA
01/17/2015; 1:00 pm		at Holy Cross	W 66–60	12–4 (4–2)	Hart Center (797); Worcester, MA
01/21/2015; 7:00 pm		at Navy	L 44–47	12–5 (4–3)	Alumni Hall (954); Annapolis, MD
01/25/2015; 1:00 pm, ASN		Lafayette	W 65–60	13–5 (5–3)	Stabler Arena (371); Bethlehem, PA
01/28/2015; 7:00 pm		Bucknell	W 76–61	14–5 (6–3)	Stabler Arena (543); Bethlehem, PA
01/31/2015; 2:00 pm		at Boston University	W 78–71	15–5 (7–3)	Case Gym (214); Boston, MA
02/04/2015; 7:00 pm		at Army	L 62–66	15–6 (7–4)	Christl Arena (499); West Point, NY
02/07/2015; 2:00 pm		Loyola (MD)	W 75–61	16–6 (8–4)	Stabler Arena (685); Bethlehem, PA
02/11/2015; 7:00 pm		at American	L 64–74	16–7 (8–5)	Bender Arena (219); Washington, D.C.
02/14/2015; 2:00 pm		Holy Cross	W 71–58	17–7 (9–5)	Stabler Arena (1,159); Bethlehem, PA
02/18/2015; 7:00 pm		Navy	L 44–50	17–8 (9–6)	Stabler Arena (578); Bethlehem, PA
02/21/2015; 2:00 pm		at Lafayette	L 51–59	17–9 (9–7)	Kirby Sports Center (673); Easton, PA
02/25/2015; 7:00 pm		at Bucknell	L 61–69	17–10 (9–8)	Sojka Pavilion (389); Lewisburg, PA
02/28/2015; 7:30 pm		Colgate	L 60–61	17–11 (9–9)	Stabler Arena (740); Bethlehem, PA
Patriot League Women's Tournament
03/06/2015; 6:00 pm		at Holy Cross; Quarterfinals	W 75–62	18–11	Hart Center (357); Worcester, MA
03/09/2015; 7:00 pm		at Army; Semifinals	W 76–57	19–11	Christl Arena (545); West Point, NY
03/14/2015; 6:00 pm, CBSSN		at American; Championship Game	L 50–66	19–12	Bender Arena (1,014); Washington, D.C.
*Non-conference game. ^{#}Rankings from AP Poll. (#) Tournament seedings in parentheses. All times are in Eastern Time.

== See also ==
2014–15 Lehigh Mountain Hawks men's basketball team
