= 2014–15 Army Black Knights women's basketball team =

Intercollegiate basketball season

2014–15 Army Black Knights women's basketball

WNIT, First Round
- Conference: Patriot League
- Record: 23–8 (14–4 Patriot)
- Head coach: Dave Magarity (9th season)
- Assistant coaches: Emily Garner; Jenna McLaughlin; Lisa Strack
- Home arena: Christl Arena

2014–15 Patriot League women's basketball standings
| | Conf. | | | | Overall |
| Team | W | | L | PCT | W | | L | PCT |
|---|---|---|---|---|---|---|---|---|
| American† | 16 | – | 2 | .889 | 24 | – | 8 | .750 |
| Army | 14 | – | 4 | .778 | 23 | – | 8 | .742 |
| Holy Cross | 11 | – | 7 | .611 | 15 | – | 17 | .469 |
| Bucknell | 10 | – | 8 | .556 | 18 | – | 12 | .600 |
| Navy | 10 | – | 8 | .556 | 17 | – | 14 | .548 |
| Lehigh | 9 | – | 9 | .500 | 19 | – | 12 | .613 |
| Colgate | 7 | – | 11 | .389 | 9 | – | 22 | .290 |
| Lafayette | 6 | – | 12 | .333 | 14 | – | 17 | .452 |
| Loyola (MD) | 5 | – | 13 | .278 | 7 | – | 23 | .233 |
| Boston University | 2 | – | 16 | .111 | 5 | – | 25 | .167 |
† 2015 Patriot League tournament winner As of March 19, 2015; Rankings from AP poll

The 2014–15 Army Black Knights women's basketball team represented the United States Military Academy during the 2014–15 NCAA Division I women's basketball season. The Black Knights, led by ninth year head coach Dave Magarity, played their home games at Christl Arena and were members of the Patriot League. They finished the season 23–7, 14–4 in Patriot League play to finish in second place. They advance semifinals of the Patriot League women's tournament where they lost to Lehigh. They were invited to the Women's National Invitation Tournament where they lost in the first round to St. John's.

== Roster ==
2014–15 Army Black Knights women's basketball team
Players
Coaches

| Pos. | # | Name | Height | Year | Previous school | Hometown |
|---|---|---|---|---|---|---|---|
| G | 2 | Brigette Ocran | 5 ft 6 in (1.68 m) | — | Jr | Paint Branch | Burtonsville, Md |
| F | 3 | Maggie Crisman | 6 ft 1 in (1.85 m) | — | Sr | Bow | Bow, N.H. |
| F | 4 | Margaret Anne Hubbell | 5 ft 9 in (1.75 m) | — | Fr | Germantown Academy | Doylestownm Pa. |
| G | 5 | Kelsey Minato | 5 ft 8 in (1.73 m) | — | Jr | Huntington Beach | Huntington Beach, Calif. |
| G | 10 | Aliyah Murray | 5 ft 10 in (1.78 m) | — | Fr | Delran | Delran, N.J. |
| F | 12 | Olivia Schretzman | 6 ft 1 in (1.85 m) | — | Sr | Springboro | Dayton, Ohio |
| F/C | 13 | Lena Hicks | 6 ft 4 in (1.93 m) | — | Fr | Elkton | Charlotte, N.C. |
| G | 20 | Destinee Morris | 5 ft 7 in (1.7 m) | — | Fr | Centennial | Lino Lakes, Minn. |
| G | 21 | Janae McNeal | 5 ft 9 in (1.75 m) | — | Fr | Courtland | Spotsylvania, Va. |
| G/F | 22 | Bridget Ryan | 5 ft 11 in (1.8 m) | — | Jr | Mount Saint mary Academy (Blair Academy) | Scotch Plains, N.J. |
| G | 23 | Daizjah Morris | 5 ft 7 in (1.7 m) | — | Fr | Centennial | Lino Lakes, Minn. |
| G/F | 24 | Jean Parker | 5 ft 9 in (1.75 m) | — | Jr | Jesuit | Portland, Ore. |
| F | 25 | Bridgette Dougherty | 6 ft 1 in (1.85 m) | — | So | Southern Lehigh | Coopersburg, Pa. |
| G | 30 | Jordan Elliott | 5 ft 9 in (1.75 m) | — | Sr | Seoul (South Korea) American HS | Fayetteville, N.C. |
| F | 32 | Ciara Jackson | 6 ft 1 in (1.85 m) | — | Sr | Ragsdale | High Point, N.C. |
| F/C | 33 | Aimee Oertner | 6 ft 2 in (1.88 m) | — | Jr | Northern Lehigh | Slatington, Pa. |
| F | 34 | Jahla Osborne | 6 ft 0 in (1.83 m) | — | Fr | Colonial Forge | Stafford, Va. |
| F/C | 35 | Dani failor | 6 ft 1 in (1.85 m) | — | So | Post Falls | Post Falls, Idaho |
| F | 41 | Brianna Johnson | 5 ft 10 in (1.78 m) | — | Jr | Etiwanda | Fontana, Calif. |
| F | 42 | Alex Elzinga | 5 ft 11 in (1.8 m) | — | So | Adlai E. Stevenson | Long grove, Ill. |
| F | 44 | Allie Setter | 5 ft 10 in (1.78 m) | — | Jr | Shenendehowa Central | Ballston Lake, N.Y. |
| F/C | 52 | Stephanie Geyer | 6 ft 1 in (1.85 m) | — | So | Del Oro | Loomis, Calif. |

Head coach

Dave Magarity

Assistant coach(es)

- Emily Garner
- Jenna McLaughlin
- Lisa Strack

Legend

- (C) Team captain
- (S) Suspended
- (I) Ineligible
- (W) Walk-on
- Injured
- Current redshirt

Roster

== Schedule ==
| Date time, TV | Rank^{#} | Opponent^{#} | Result | Record | Site (attendance) city, state |
Non-conference regular season
| 11/15/2014*; 2:00 pm | | at Quinnipiac | L 64–79 | 0–1 | TD Bank Sports Center (610); Hampden, CT |
| 11/18/2014*; 7:00 pm | | Stony Brook | W 68–59 | 1–1 | Christl Arena (519); West Point, NY |
| 11/22/2014*; 2:00 pm | | at Manhattan | W 81–49 | 2–1 | Draddy Gymnasium (248); Riverdale, NY |
| 11/25/2014*; 5:00 pm | | Air Force | W 79–35 | 3–1 | Christl Arena (835); West Point, NY |
| 11/28/2014*; 10:00 pm | | at UC Santa Barbara | W 61–39 | 4–1 | The Thunderdome (373); Santa Barbara, CA |
| 11/30/2014*; 4:00 pm | | at Pepperdine | W 56–44 | 5–1 | Firestone Fieldhouse (N/A); Malibu, CA |
| 12/06/2014*; 2:00 pm | | at Fairleigh Dickinson | L 48–56 | 5–2 | Rothman Center (342); Hackensack, NJ |
| 12/08/2014*; 7:00 pm | | St. Francis Brooklyn | W 61–55 | 6–2 | Christl Arena (456); West Point, NY |
| 12/13/2014*; 1:00 pm | | at Central Connecticut | W 74–60 | 7–2 | William H. Detrick Gymnasium (362); New Britain, CT |
| 12/20/2014*; 1:00 pm | | St. Thomas Aquinas | W 70–45 | 8–2 | Christl Arena (731); West Point, NY |
Conference regular season
| 12/31/2014; 2:00 pm, WBPH | | at Lafayette | L 60–71 | 8–3 (0–1) | Kirby Sports Center (873); Easton, PA |
| 01/03/2015; 1:00 pm | | Loyola (MD) | W 55–44 | 9–3 (1–1) | Christl Arena (731); West Point, NY |
| 01/07/2015; 7:00 pm | | at Lehigh | L 51–63 | 9–4 (1–2) | Stabler Arena (668); Bethlehem, PA |
| 01/10/2015; 2:30 pm | | Navy | L 50–53 | 9–5 (1–3) | Christl Arena (5,291); West Point, NY |
| 01/14/2015; 7:00 pm | | Holy Cross | W 67–53 | 10–5 (2–3) | Christl Arena (536); West Point, NY |
| 01/18/2015; 3:00 pm | | Bucknell | W 67–45 | 11–5 (3–3) | Christl Arena (620); West Point, NY |
| 01/21/2015; 7:00 pm | | at Colgate | W 64–62 | 12–5 (4–3) | Cotterell Court (477); Hamilton, NY |
| 01/24/2015; 3:00 pm | | American | W 68–60 | 13–5 (5–3) | Christl Arena (764); West Point, NY |
| 01/29/2015; 7:00 pm | | at Boston University | W 65–40 | 14–5 (6–3) | Case Gym (140); Boston, MA |
| 01/31/2015; 2:00 pm | | at Loyola (MD) | W 62–53 | 15–5 (7–3) | Reitz Arena (837); Baltimore, MD |
| 02/04/2015; 7:00 pm | | Lehigh | W 66–62 | 16–5 (8–3) | Christl Arena (499); West Point, NY |
| 02/07/2015; 4:30 pm | | at Navy; Star Game | W 58–46 | 17–5 (9–3) | Alumni Hall (6,110); Annapolis, MD |
| 02/11/2015; 7:05 pm, WCTR | | at Holy Cross | W 53–51 | 18–5 (10–3) | Hart Center (956); Worcester, MA |
| 02/15/2015; 2:00 pm, CBSSN | | at Bucknell | W 50–46 | 19–5 (11–3) | Sojka Pavilion (929); Lewisburg, PA |
| 02/18/2015; 7:00 pm | | Colgate | W 48–47 | 20–5 (12–3) | Christl Arena (569); West Point, NY |
| 02/21/2015; 1:00 pm | | at American | L 42–45 | 20–6 (12–4) | Bender Arena (408); Washington, D.C. |
| 02/25/2015; 7:00 pm | | Boston University | W 64–50 | 21–6 (13–4) | Christl Arena (754); West Point, NY |
| 02/28/2015; 3:00 pm | | Lafayette | W 57–41 | 22–6 (14–4) | Christl Arena (952); West Point, NY |
Patriot League Tournament
| 03/06/2015; 7:00 pm | | (7) Colgate; Quarterfinals | W 48–45 ^{OT} | 23–6 | Christl Arena (487); West Point, NY |
| 03/09/2015; 7:00 pm | | (6) Lehigh; Semifinals | L 57–76 | 23–7 | Christl Arena (542); West Point, NY |
WNIT
| 03/19/2015; 7:00 pm, ESPN3 | | at St. John's; First Round | L 56–64 | 23–8 | Carnesecca Arena (211); Queens, NY |
*Non-conference game. ^{#}Rankings from AP Poll. (#) Tournament seedings in parentheses. All times are in Eastern Time.

== See also ==
- 2014–15 Army Black Knights men's basketball team
