= UT Permian Basin Falcons =

- University: University of Texas Permian Basin
- Nickname: Falcons
- NCAA: Division II
- Conference: LSC (primary); RMAC (swimming)
- Athletic director: Scott Larson
- Location: Odessa, Texas
- First season: 1995
- Varsity teams: 14 (6 men's, 8 women's)
- Football stadium: Astound Broadband Stadium
- Basketball arena: Falcon Dome
- Baseball stadium: Roden Field
- Soccer stadium: UTPB Soccer Field
- Colors: Falcon orange and black
- Website: utpbfalcons.com

The UT Permian Basin Falcons (also UTPB Falcons) are the athletic teams that represent the University of Texas Permian Basin, located in Odessa, Texas, United States, in intercollegiate sports as a member of the Division II level of the National Collegiate Athletic Association (NCAA), primarily competing in Lone Star Conference for most of their varsity sports since the 2016–17 academic year. A UTPB Falcons football team was added for the 2016 NCAA Division II football season to bring the total number of varsity teams to 16. UTPB previously competed in the D-II Heartland Conference from 2006–07 to 2015–16; in the Red River Athletic Conference (RRAC) of the National Association of Intercollegiate Athletics (NAIA) from 1998–99 to 2005–06; and as an NAIA Independent from 1995–96 to 1997–98.

== History ==
Although early attempts were made to develop athletics at the university, such as a tennis team from 1979–88 and a rugby team for a short time, the university's position as an upper-level institution for junior, senior, and graduate students made long-term sustainability of athletic teams difficult. In 1991, the Texas State Legislature authorized UTPB to offer freshman and sophomore level courses, and within a year, a committee of faculty, staff, and community members assembled by UTPB President Charles Sorber investigated the potential for intercollegiate athletics. The committee recommended the creation of a limited program of athletics to increase student life and increase freshmen enrollment. In 1993, the legislature and the board of regents approved a student fee to help support an athletics program and authorized the creation of the current UTPB athletics. By 1994, the university had begun club sports on campus, and in 1995, the university joined the National Association of Intercollegiate Athletics (NAIA). Volleyball became the first intercollegiate sport in the fall of 1995. Softball and men's soccer and joined the athletic program in the following academic year; and the university joined the Red River Athletic Conference (RRAC).

The early 2000s brought more expansion to the UTPB athletic program when the students voted to increase the amount of student fees allocated to support of athletics. The legislature and board of regents approved the fee increase in summer of 2001 and the university added women's soccer in the fall of 2001, followed by men's and women's basketball in the fall of 2002. The university began offering a limited number of athletic scholarships in 2003 and a second fee increase in the fall of 2003 allowed for the addition of five additional sports for the 2004-05 academic year, when the school added men's and women's cross country, men’s and women’s swimming, and baseball. Major changes to the athletic program occurred in 2006 when the university was approved for provisional membership in the NCAA. The university also became a member of the Heartland Conference. After a successful transition period, UTPB became a full member of the NCAA at the Division II level in the fall of 2008.

The Falcons have seen success since joining the Lone Star, shocking the league in their first season by winning the men's basketball conference championship. They followed that season with a run to the South Central Regional Finals and reached the top-10 in the country in national polls. On November 2, 2020, Todd Dooley took over as director of athletics, replacing the retiring Scott Farmer, who served as AD since 2017. After the COVID pandemic forced the 2020 football season to be moved to the spring, the Falcons went 5-0 and finished undefeated for the first time in program history.

== Varsity teams ==
UTPB competes in 14 intercollegiate varsity sports: Men's sports include baseball, basketball, football, golf, swimming & diving and tennis; while women's sports include basketball, cross country, golf, soccer, softball, swimming & diving, tennis and volleyball.

Basketball player Daeshon Francis played basketball for the school in 2016–18. In 2016–17, he averaged 18.2 points and 6.6 rebounds per game, with a .559 field goal percentage. He was named 2016-17 Lone Star Conference Player of the Year, Lone Star Conference All-First Team, Lone Star Conference Newcomer of the Year, and NABC All-District South Central First Team.

=== Conference Championships ===
==== Lone Star Conference ====
Basketball (M)	2017
Football	2023
Tennis (M)	2024

==== Heartland Conference ====
Baseball	2009
Basketball (M)	2011
Basketball (W)	2011
Volleyball	2008

==== Red River Athletic Conference (RRAC) ====
Soccer (M)	2005
Volleyball	1999, 2000, 2001

==== Rocky Mountain Athletic Conference (RMAC) ====
Swimming and Diving (M)	2008

== Gallery ==
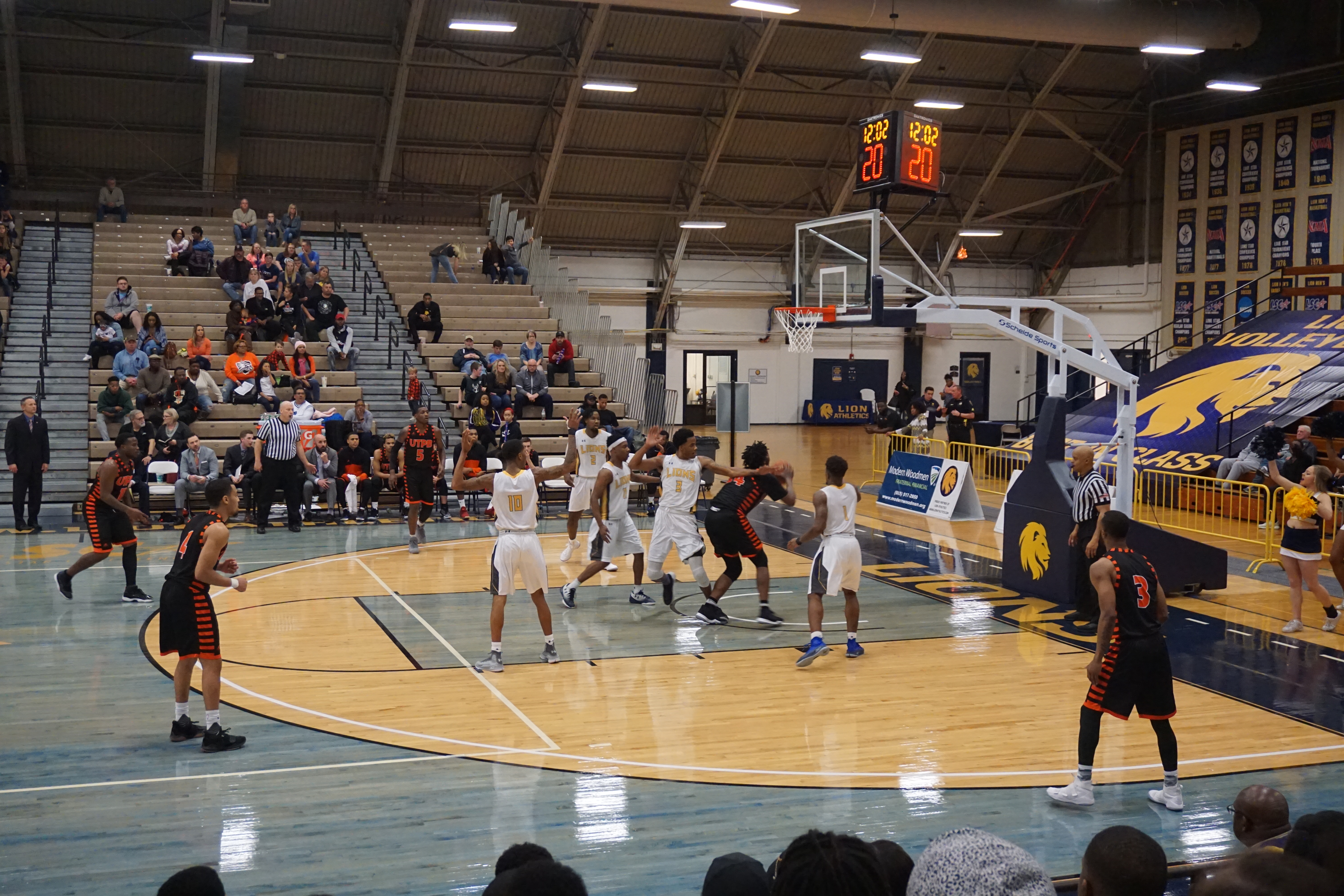
Men's basketball game

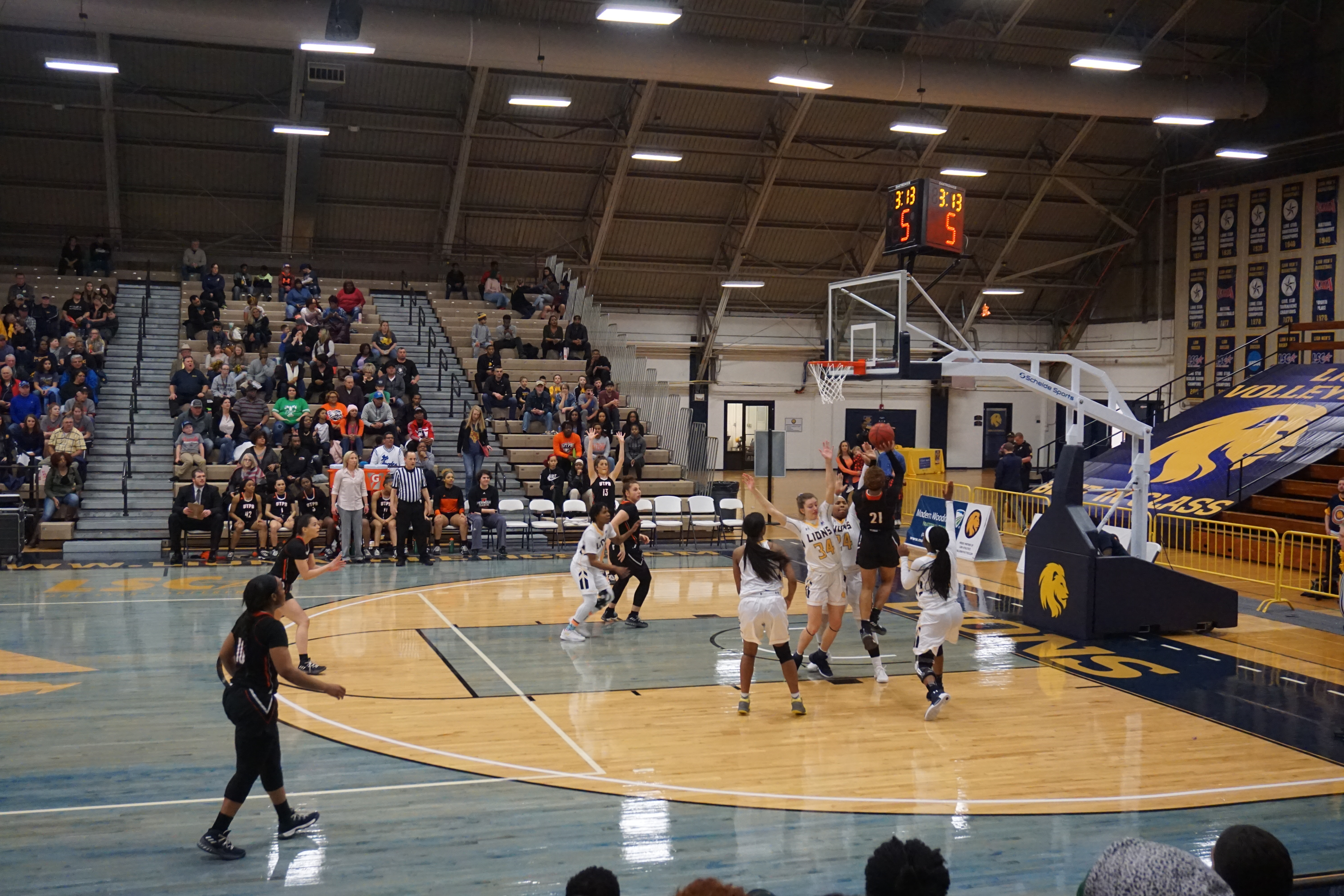
Women's basketball game

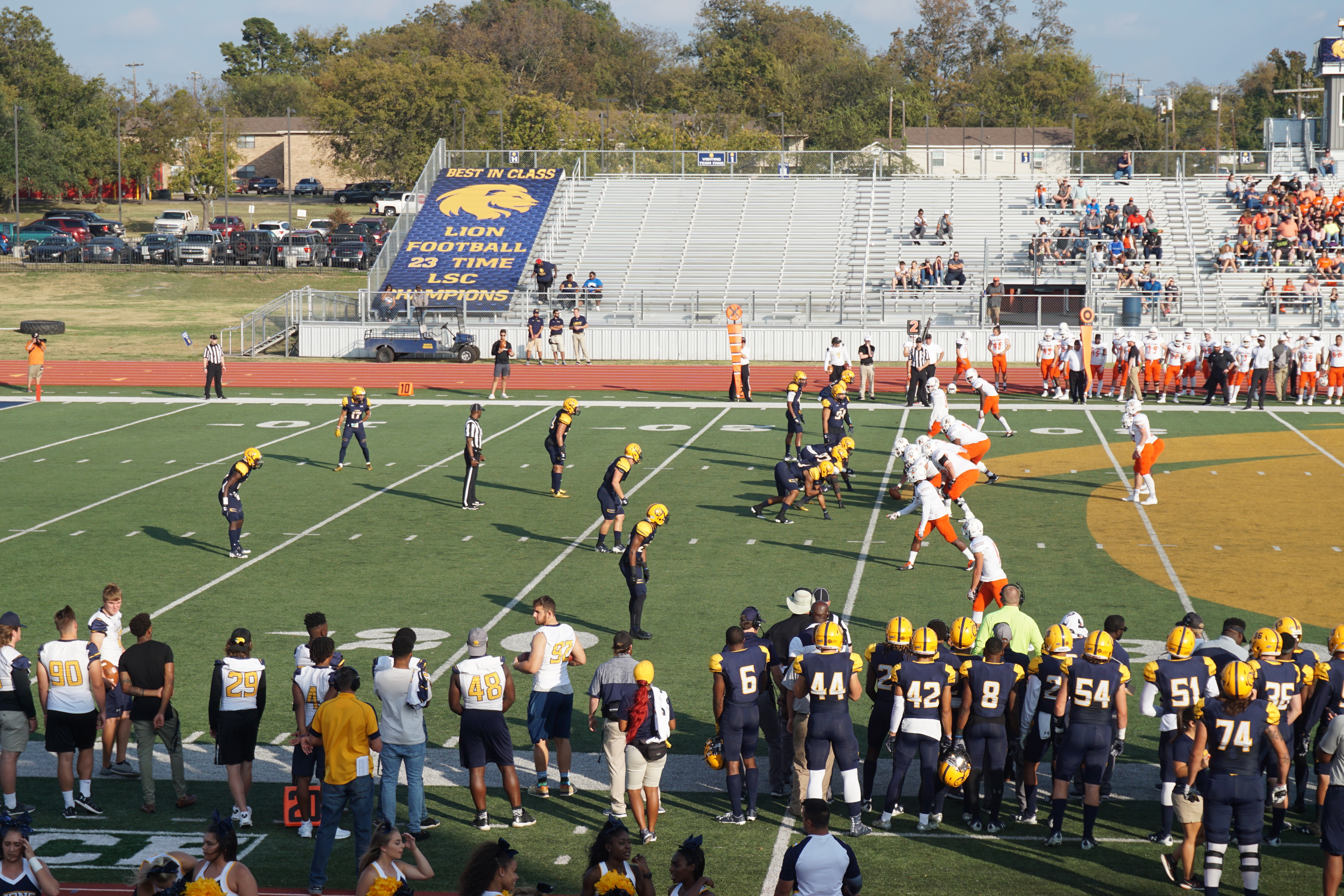
Football game

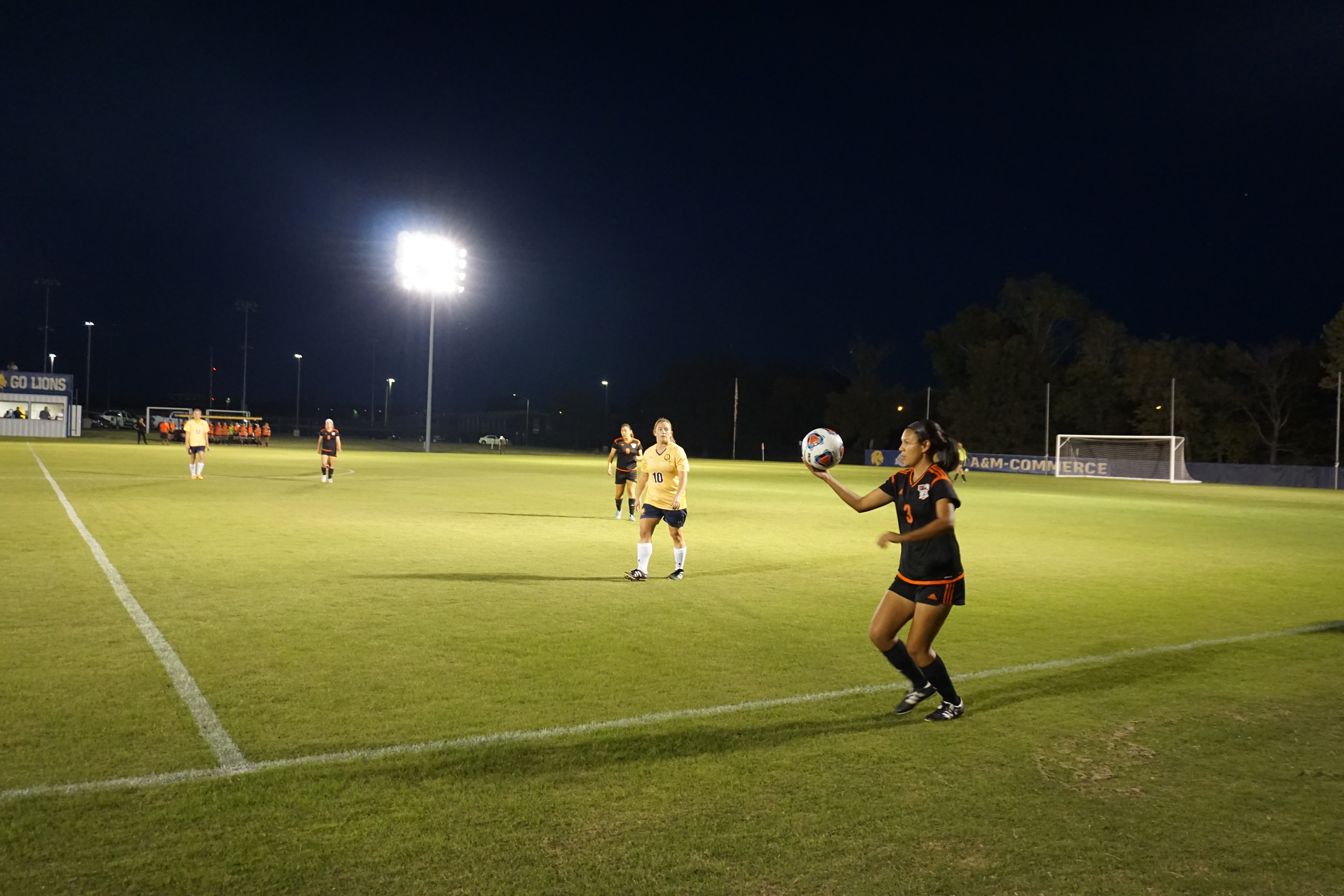
Women's soccer match

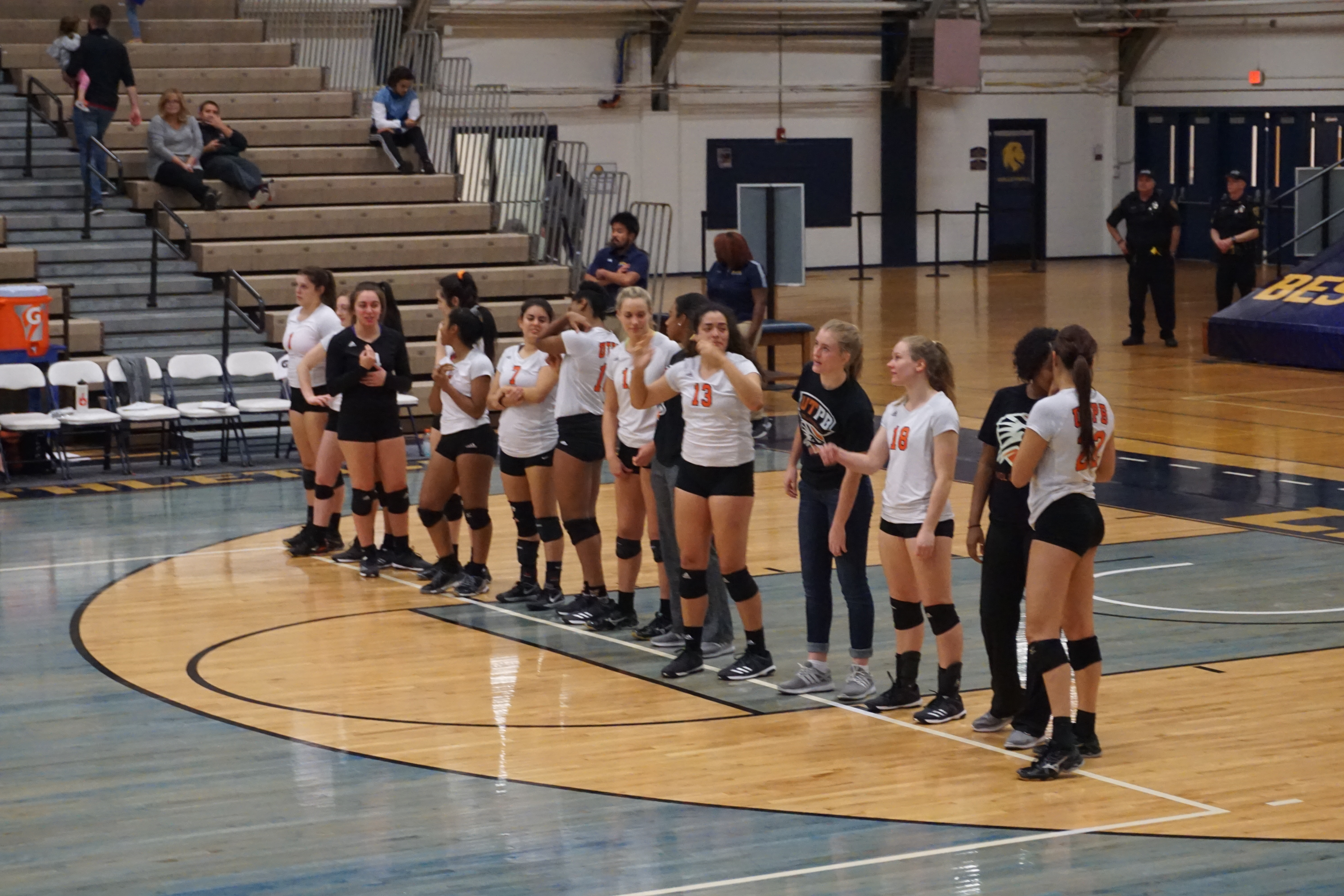
Women's volleyball game
