= Lehigh Mountain Hawks women's basketball =

2026–27 Lehigh Mountain Hawks women's basketball team
- University: Lehigh University
- Head coach: Addie Micir (5th season)
- Location: Bethlehem, Pennsylvania
- Arena: Stabler Arena (capacity: 5,600 – basketball)
- Conference: Patriot League
- Nickname: Mountain Hawks
- Colors: Brown and white

NCAA Division I tournament appearances
- 1997, 2009, 2010, 2021, 2025

Conference tournament champions
- 1986, 1997, 2009, 2010, 2021, 2025

Conference regular-season champions
- 1986, 2009, 2010, 2025

The Lehigh Mountain Hawks women’s basketball team is a college basketball program representing Lehigh University in Bethlehem, Pennsylvania. The Mountain Hawks are a member of NCAA Division I basketball, and compete in the Patriot League. They are coached by Addie Micir, entering her 3rd season as head coach. The Mountain Hawks currently play their home games at Stabler Arena.

== History ==
Lehigh first sponsored a varsity women's basketball team for the 1974–75 season, just a few years after the university became coed. The team competed in the East Coast Conference from 1982–83 through the 1989–90 season. Muffet McGraw coached the team from 1982 to 1987 before becoming the head coach at Notre Dame. Lehigh is a charter member of the Patriot League, which began play in women's basketball in the fall of 1990.

As of the end of the 2017–18 season, the Mountain Hawks have an all-time record of 571–599. They have won four conference championships in their history, including an East Coast Conference title in 1986 and three Patriot League titles in 1997, 2009 and 2010. They have made five NCAA Tournament appearances in program history, and have lost in the first round all four times.

== Home arenas ==
The team originally played its home games exclusively inside Grace Hall on Lehigh's main Asa Packer Campus. Upon the opening of Stabler Arena in 1979, Lehigh's women's team began playing select games at Stabler, while still playing a majority of their home games at Grace Hall. The program began playing its full home schedule at Stabler during the 1989–90 season. Through the 2017–18 season, Lehigh has compiled a 255–184 record at Stabler Arena.

== Records ==
=== Most points scored in a match ===
In the 2023–24 season, the team broke their record for the most points scored in a single game with 106 points scored against La Salle University. This breaks the previous record held by Lehigh, when they defeated Albright College 103–34 on Feb 3, 1977.

=== Most three pointers in a match ===
On December 7, 2023, in a match against La Salle University Lehigh scored 17 three-pointers, which tied the Patriot League record.

== Year-by-year records ==
Record table
Season	Coach	Overall	Conference	Standing	Postseason
Independent (1974–1982)
1974–75	Barbara Lipkin	2–5			
1975–76	Barbara Lipkin	6–4			
1976–77	Annette Lynch	13–7			
1977–78	Annette Lynch	6–10			
1978–79	Annette Lynch	10–8			
1979–80	Annette Lynch	11–10			
1980–81	Maureen Frederick	7–15			
1981–82	Maureen Frederick	7–15			
East Coast Conference (1982–1990)
1982–83	Muffet McGraw	14–9	4–5	2nd West	
1983–84	Muffet McGraw	13–9	4–4	6th	
1984–85	Muffet McGraw	20–8	10–4	3rd	
1985–86	Muffet McGraw	24–4	12–2	1st	
1986–87	Muffet McGraw	17–11	8–6	3rd	
1987–88	Anne Sinnot-Skutches	10–17	6–8	6th	
1988–89	Anne Skutches/Jocelyn Beck	7–21	5–9	7th	
1989–90	Jocelyn Beck	21–8	12–2	2nd	
Patriot League (1990–present)
1990–91	Jocelyn Beck	10–18	3–9	6th	
1991–92	Jocelyn Beck	2–26	1–13	8th/Last	
1992–93	Jocelyn Beck	1–26	1–13	8th/Last	
1993–94	Jocelyn Beck	6–21	4–10	7th	
1994–95	Jocelyn Beck	3–24	2–12	8th/Last	
1995–96	Sue Troyan	14–13	5–7	4th	
1996–97	Sue Troyan	15–15	7–5	3rd	NCAA Division I Round of 64
1997–98	Sue Troyan	11–17	4–8	5th	
1998–99	Sue Troyan	15–12	6–6	4th	
1999–00	Sue Troyan	13–16	6–6	4th	
2000–01	Sue Troyan	16–14	7–5	3rd	
2001–02	Sue Troyan	12–16	8–6	3rd	
2002–03	Sue Troyan	12–15	9–5	3rd	
2003–04	Sue Troyan	13–16	9–5	3rd	
2004–05	Sue Troyan	19–10	10–4	2nd	
2005–06	Sue Troyan	10–18	5–9	6th	
2006–07	Sue Troyan	11–19	5–9	7th	
2007–08	Sue Troyan	18–13	9–5	3rd	
2008–09	Sue Troyan	26–7	12–2	1st	NCAA Division I Round of 64
2009–10	Sue Troyan	29–4	13–1	1st	NCAA Division I Round of 64
2010–11	Sue Troyan	21–11	10–4	2nd	WNIT First Round
2011–12	Sue Troyan	17–13	9–5	2nd	
2012–13	Sue Troyan	14–16	6–8	5th	
2013–14	Sue Troyan	13–18	5–13	8th	
2014–15	Sue Troyan	19–12	9–9	6th	
2015–16	Sue Troyan	18–13	10–8	4th	
2016–17	Sue Troyan	10–20	5–13	9th	
2017–18	Sue Troyan	15–15	9–9	4th	
2018–19	Sue Troyan	21–10	12–6	3rd	
2019–20	Sue Troyan	19–11	10–8	6th	
2020–21	Sue Troyan	10–6	7–5	4th	NCAA Division I Round of 64
2021–22	Sue Troyan	19–11	11–7	5th	
2022–23	Addie Micir	17–14	12–6	3rd	
2023–24	Addie Micir	17–13	9–9	5th	
2024–25	Addie Micir	27–7	15–3	1st	NCAA Division I Round of 64
2025–26	Addie Micir	17–14	11–7	4th	
Total:		718–685			
National champion Postseason invitational champion Conference regular season champion Conference regular season and conference tournament champion Division regular season champion Division regular season and conference tournament champion Conference tournament champion

- Due to the COVID-19 pandemic, the Patriot League for the 2020–21 season was temporarily divided into three regional mini-conferences based on geography. Each team played a 16-game regular-season schedule which included four matches against each regional opponent. As usual, listed standings position reflected by conference tournament seed.

== NCAA tournament results ==
Year	Seed	Round	Opponent	Result
1997	#16	First Round	#1 Connecticut	L 35–103
2009	#15	First Round	#2 Auburn	L 49–85
2010	#13	First Round	#4 Iowa State	L 42–79
2021	#13	First Round	#4 West Virginia	L 53–77
2025	#15	First Round	#2 Duke	L 25–86
