= 2024–25 Colgate Raiders women's basketball team =

American college basketball season

2024–25 Colgate Raiders women's basketball

WNIT, First Round
- Conference: Patriot League
- Record: 23–10 (13–5 Patriot)
- Head coach: Ganiyat Adeduntan (4th season)
- Assistant coaches: Macey Hollenshead; Jason Asbell; Ethan Kenney; Lauren Coleman
- Home arena: Cotterell Court

2024–25 Patriot League women's basketball standings
	Conf.				Overall
Team	W		L	PCT	W		L	PCT
Lehigh †	15	–	3	.833	27	–	7	.794
Army	14	–	4	.778	25	–	8	.758
Colgate	13	–	5	.722	23	–	10	.697
Navy	11	–	7	.611	19	–	12	.613
Holy Cross	11	–	7	.611	19	–	12	.613
Bucknell	11	–	7	.611	17	–	14	.548
Lafayette	6	–	12	.333	10	–	21	.323
Boston University	5	–	13	.278	12	–	19	.387
Loyola	3	–	15	.167	9	–	21	.300
American	1	–	17	.056	1	–	29	.033
† 2025 Patriot League tournament winner

The 2024–25 Colgate Raiders women's basketball team represented Colgate University during the 2024–25 NCAA Division I women's basketball season. The Raiders, who were led by fourth-year head coach Ganiyat Adeduntan, played their home games at Cotterell Court in Hamilton, New York as members of the Patriot League.

== Previous season ==
The Raiders finished the 2023–24 season 20–14, 10–8 in Patriot League play, to finish in a three-way tie for second place. They defeated Navy, before falling to Boston University in the semifinals of the Patriot League tournament. They received an automatic bid into the WNIT, where they would defeat Albany in the first round, and Providence in the second round, before falling to Vermont in the Super 16.

== Preseason ==
On October 16, 2024, the Patriot League released their preseason coaches poll. Colgate was picked to finish second in the Patriot League regular season.

=== Preseason rankings ===
Patriot League preseason poll
Predicted finish	Team	Votes (1st place)
1	Loyola (MD)	148 (10)
2	Colgate	120 (5)
3	Lehigh	109
4	Army	108 (1)
5	Boston University	106 (2)
6	Holy Cross	102 (2)
7	Navy	101
8	Bucknell	51
9	Lafayette	30
10	American	25

=== Preseason All-Patriot League Team ===
Preseason All-Patriot League Team
Player	Position	Year
Taylor Golembiewski	Guard	Senior

== Roster ==
2024–25 Colgate Raiders women's basketball team
Players
Coaches

Pos.	#	Name	Height	Year	Previous school	Hometown
G/F	0	Amarah Streiff	5 ft 10 in (1.78 m)	So	Bishop Ludden High School	Syracuse, New York
G	1	Morgan McMahon	5 ft 10 in (1.78 m)	Sr	St. James School	Hagerstown, Maryland
G/F	2	Christina Midgette	6 ft 0 in (1.83 m)	Jr	Franklin High School	Princeton, New Jersey
G	3	Ella Mahaffey	5 ft 7 in (1.7 m)	Fr	Riverside High School	Leesburg, Virginia
G	4	Madison Schiller	5 ft 8 in (1.73 m)	Jr	Ramapo High School	Wyckoff, New Jersey
G	5	Taylor Golembiewski	5 ft 8 in (1.73 m)	Sr	E. O. Smith High School	Columbia, Connecticut
G	12	Laila Hankerson	5 ft 6 in (1.68 m)	So	Xavier	Charlotte, North Carolina
F	13	Sophia Diehl	6 ft 1 in (1.85 m)	Sr	Roland Park Country School	Westminster, Maryland
G	20	Tatiana Matthews	5 ft 9 in (1.75 m)	Fr	Dunnellon High School	Dunnellon, Florida
G	21	Lara Cook	5 ft 10 in (1.78 m)	Jr	King's Christian Collegiate	St. Catharines, Ontario
F	23	Chidinma Okafor (5Y)	6 ft 4 in (1.93 m)	Sr	USC Aiken	Santa Clarita, California
G	24	Anne Bair	5 ft 8 in (1.73 m)	Jr	Manhattan	Gettysburg, Pennsylvania
G/F	25	Ella Meabon	5 ft 8 in (1.73 m)	So	Fairport High School	Fairport, New York
F/C	35	Maryan Eniafe	6 ft 2 in (1.88 m)	So	Maret School	Upper Marlboro, Maryland
G/F	41	Abbey Ferguson	5 ft 11 in (1.8 m)	Jr	Holmdel High School	Holmdel, New Jersey
F	44	Grace Klag	6 ft 2 in (1.88 m)	Jr	Bucknell	Westfield, New Jersey

Head coach

- Ganiyat Adeduntan (Florida State)

Assistant coach(es)

- Macey Hollenshead (Fairfield)
- Jason Asbell (Thomas Edison State)
- Ethan Kenney (Michigan)
- Lauren Coleman (Florida State)

Legend

- (C) Team captain
- (S) Suspended
- (I) Ineligible
- (W) Walk-on
- (5Y) Fifth-year senior
- Injured
- Current redshirt

Roster
Last update: May 10, 2025

== Schedule and results ==
Date time, TV	Rank^{#}	Opponent^{#}	Result	Record	Site (attendance) city, state
Non-conference regular season
November 4, 2024*; 6:00 pm, ESPN+		UMass Lowell	W 74–62	1–0	Cotterell Court (426); Hamilton, NY
November 8, 2024*; 2:00 pm, ESPN+		at Cal State Bakersfield	W 71–42	2–0	Icardo Center (1,326); Bakersfield, CA
November 10, 2024*; 5:00 pm, B1G+		at No. 5 UCLA	L 63–81	2–1	Pauley Pavilion (3,285); Los Angeles, CA
November 15, 2024*; 6:00 pm, ESPN+		Central Connecticut	W 74–60	3–1	Cotterell Court (256); Hamilton, NY
November 19, 2024*; 11:00 am, FloHoops		at Delaware	L 82–88	3–2	Bob Carpenter Center (4,631); Newark, DE
November 23, 2024*; 1:00 pm, ESPN+		at St. Bonaventure	W 82–72	4–2	Reilly Center (303); St. Bonaventure, NY
November 29, 2024*; 1:00 pm, ESPN+		UMBC; Colgate Thanksgiving Tournament semifinals	W 75–49	5–2	Cotterell Court (471); Hamilton, NY
November 30, 2024*; 4:00 pm, ESPN+		Akron; Colgate Thanksgiving Tournament championship	W 62–45	6–2	Cotterell Court (327); Hamilton, NY
December 7, 2024*; 4:00 pm, RyzSN		vs. Omaha; Coaches vs. Racism	L 57–71	6–3	Entertainment and Sports Arena; Washington, D.C.
December 10, 2024*; 6:00 pm, ESPN+		Union	W 92–51	7–3	Cotterell Court (173); Hamilton, NY
December 14, 2024*; 3:00 pm, ESPN+		Pitt–Johnstown	W 71–46	8–3	Cotterell Court (183); Hamilton, NY
December 21, 2024*; 12:00 pm, NEC Front Row		at Le Moyne	W 69–45	9–3	Ted Grant Court (259); DeWitt, NY
December 29, 2024*; 1:00 pm, ESPN+		at Canisius	W 66–47	10–3	Koessler Athletic Center (422); Buffalo, NY
Patriot League regular season
January 2, 2025; 6:00 pm, ESPN+		at Army	L 38–56	10–4 (0–1)	Christl Arena (569); West Point, NY
January 5, 2025; 2:00 pm, ESPN+		Bucknell	L 34–51	10–5 (0–2)	Cotterell Court (278); Hamilton, NY
January 8, 2025; 6:00 pm, ESPN+		at Lehigh	W 70–66	11–5 (1–2)	Stabler Arena (530); Bethlehem, PA
January 11, 2025; 2:00 pm, ESPN+		at Boston University	W 61–49	12–5 (2–2)	Case Gym (915); Boston, MA
January 15, 2025; 11:00 am, ESPN+		Navy	W 62–54	13–5 (3–2)	Cotterell Court (1,604); Hamilton, NY
January 18, 2025; 2:00 pm, ESPN+		Lafayette	W 72–56	14–5 (4–2)	Cotterell Court (208); Hamilton, NY
January 22, 2025; 6:00 pm, ESPN+		at Bucknell	L 67–71 ^{OT}	14–6 (4–3)	Sojka Pavilion (294); Lewisburg, PA
January 25, 2025; 2:00 pm, ESPN+		American	W 85–43	15–6 (5–3)	Cotterell Court (303); Hamilton, NY
January 29, 2025; 6:00 pm, ESPN+		Army	L 60–65	15–7 (5–4)	Cotterell Court (197); Hamilton, NY
February 1, 2025; 2:00 pm, ESPN+		at Lafayette	W 75–44	16–7 (6–4)	Kirby Sports Center (668); Easton, PA
February 9, 2025; 2:00 pm, ESPN+		at Loyola (MD)	W 74–59	17–7 (7–4)	Reitz Arena (930); Baltimore, MD
February 12, 2025; 6:00 pm, ESPN+		Holy Cross	W 73–51	18–7 (8–4)	Cotterell Court (186); Hamilton, NY
February 15, 2025; 2:00 pm, ESPN+		Boston University	W 71–51	19–7 (9–4)	Cotterell Court (308); Hamilton, NY
February 19, 2025; 7:00 pm, ESPN+		at Navy	W 76–72 ^{OT}	20–7 (10–4)	Alumni Hall (408); Annapolis, MD
February 22, 2025; 2:00 pm, ESPN+		Loyola (MD)	W 68–57	21–7 (11–4)	Cotterell Court (423); Hamilton, NY
February 26, 2025; 6:00 pm, ESPN+		at Holy Cross	L 55–59	21–8 (11–5)	Hart Center (562); Worcester, MA
March 1, 2025; 2:00 pm, ESPN+		at American	W 83–64	22–8 (12–5)	Bender Arena (912); Washington, D.C.
March 5, 2025; 6:00 pm, ESPN+		Lehigh	W 78–59	23–8 (13–5)	Cotterell Court (461); Hamilton, NY
Patriot League tournament
March 10, 2025; 6:00 pm, ESPN+	(3)	(6) Bucknell; Quarterfinals	L 58–63	23–9	Cotterell Court (573); Hamilton, NY
WNIT
March 22, 2025*; 6:00 pm, ESPN+		Coppin State; First Round	L 48–58	23–10	Cotterell Court (243); Hamilton, NY
*Non-conference game. ^{#}Rankings from AP Poll. (#) Tournament seedings in parentheses. All times are in Eastern.
