= 2024–25 American Eagles women's basketball team =

American college basketball season

2024–25 American Eagles women's basketball
- Conference: Patriot League
- Record: 1–29 (1–17 Patriot)
- Head coach: Tiffany Coll (3rd season)
- Assistant coaches: Michelle Holmes; Kaitlyn Lewis; Christie Rogers
- Home arena: Bender Arena

2024–25 Patriot League women's basketball standings
	Conf.				Overall
Team	W		L	PCT	W		L	PCT
Lehigh †	15	–	3	.833	27	–	7	.794
Army	14	–	4	.778	25	–	8	.758
Colgate	13	–	5	.722	23	–	10	.697
Navy	11	–	7	.611	19	–	12	.613
Holy Cross	11	–	7	.611	19	–	12	.613
Bucknell	11	–	7	.611	17	–	14	.548
Lafayette	6	–	12	.333	10	–	21	.323
Boston University	5	–	13	.278	12	–	19	.387
Loyola	3	–	15	.167	9	–	21	.300
American	1	–	17	.056	1	–	29	.033
† 2025 Patriot League tournament winner

The 2024–25 American Eagles women's basketball team represented American University during the 2024–25 NCAA Division I women's basketball season. The Eagles, who were led by third-year head coach Candice Dupree, played their home games at Bender Arena in Washington, D.C., as members of the Patriot League.

== Previous season ==
The Eagles finished the 2023–24 season 10–20, 8–10 in Patriot League play, to finish in ninth place. They were defeated by Bucknell in the first round of the Patriot League tournament.

== Preseason ==
On October 16, 2024, the Patriot League released their preseason coaches poll. American was picked to finish last in the Patriot League regular season.

=== Preseason rankings ===
Patriot League preseason poll
Predicted finish	Team	Votes (1st place)
1	Loyola (MD)	148 (10)
2	Colgate	120 (5)
3	Lehigh	109
4	Army	108 (1)
5	Boston University	106 (2)
6	Holy Cross	102 (2)
7	Navy	101
8	Bucknell	51
9	Lafayette	30
10	American	25

=== Preseason All-Patriot League Team ===
No Eagles were named to the Preseason All-Patriot League Team.

== Roster ==
2024–25 American Eagles women's basketball team
Players
Coaches

Pos.	#	Name	Height	Year	Previous school	Hometown
G	1	Anna Rescifina	5 ft 11 in (1.8 m)	Jr	Liceo Classico Goffredo Mameli	Sicily, Italy
G	2	Ivy Bales	5 ft 10 in (1.78 m)	GS	Gatlinburg-Pittman High School	Gatlinburg, Tennessee
G	3	Bailey Garbee	5 ft 11 in (1.8 m)	Sr	Quaker Valley High School	Sewickley, Pennsylvania
G	4	Laura Nogues	5 ft 7 in (1.7 m)	Jr	Escola Pia de Sabadell	Sabadell, Spain
G	5	Molly Driscoll	5 ft 8 in (1.73 m)	Fr	Allentown Central Catholic High School	Allentown, Pennsylvania
F	10	Grace Koepke	6 ft 4 in (1.93 m)	So	Vernon Hills High School	Vernon Hills, Illinois
G	11	Elizabeth Archer	6 ft 0 in (1.83 m)	Fr	Blair Academy	Chatham, New Jersey
G	12	Madisyn Moore-Nicholson	5 ft 7 in (1.7 m)	Fr	Georgetown Day School	Odenton, Maryland
G	20	Mary Bolesky	5 ft 4 in (1.63 m)	Fr	Lancaster Catholic High School	Elizabethtown, Pennsylvania
F	24	Ellie Pingree	6 ft 2 in (1.88 m)	Fr	St. Paul's School	Bow, New Hampshire
G	30	Lexi Salazar	5 ft 7 in (1.7 m)	So	Plainfield North High School	Plainfield, Illinois
F	32	Cecilia Kay	6 ft 2 in (1.88 m)	Fr	Bishop Fenwick High School	Melrose, Massachusetts

Head coach

- Tiffany Coll (UMBC)

Assistant coach(es)

- Michelle Holmes (American)
- Kaitlyn Lewis (American)
- Christie Rogers (Washington College)

Legend

- (C) Team captain
- (S) Suspended
- (I) Ineligible
- (W) Walk-on
- Injured
- Current redshirt

Roster
Last update: May 15, 2025

== Schedule and results ==
Date time, TV	Rank^{#}	Opponent^{#}	Result	Record	Site (attendance) city, state
Non-conference regular season
November 4, 2024*; 7:00 pm, ACCNX		at Virginia	L 68–104	0–1	John Paul Jones Arena (3,974); Charlottesville, VA
November 8, 2024*; 12:00 pm, ESPN+		Fairleigh Dickinson	L 59–62	0–2	Bender Arena (417); Washington, D.C.
November 13, 2024*; 7:00 pm, ESPN+		Longwood	L 41–59	0–3	Bender Arena (528); Washington, D.C.
November 20, 2024*; 6:30 pm, ESPN+		at UMBC	L 45–50	0–4	Chesapeake Employers Insurance Arena (273); Catonsville, MD
November 23, 2024*; 2:00 pm, ESPN+		La Salle	L 60–69	0–5	Bender Arena (411); Washington, D.C.
November 27, 2024*; 6:30 pm		vs. Milwaukee; Puerto Rico Clasico	L 60–74	0–6	Coliseo Rubén Rodríguez (100); Bayamón, PR
November 29, 2024*; 6:30 pm		vs. Winthrop; Puerto Rico Clasico	L 66–74	0–7	Coliseo Rubén Rodríguez (100); Bayamón, PR
December 7, 2024*; 3:30 pm, ESPN+		at Towson	L 62–89	0–8	TU Arena (325); Towson, MD
December 16, 2024*; 7:00 pm, ESPN+		George Washington	L 47–62	0–9	Bender Arena (311); Washington, D.C.
December 21, 2024*; 4:30 pm, FloHoops		at Monmouth	L 51–64	0–10	OceanFirst Bank Center (731); West Long Branch, NJ
December 29, 2024*; 12:30 pm, ESPN+		Howard	L 46–75	0–11	Bender Arena (495); Washington, D.C.
Patriot League regular season
January 2, 2025; 7:00 pm, ESPN+		Navy	L 59–66	0–12 (0–1)	Bender Arena (355); Washington, D.C.
January 5, 2025; 2:00 pm, ESPN+		at Holy Cross	L 61–69	0–13 (0–2)	Hart Center (872); Worcester, MA
January 8, 2025; 11:30 am, ESPN+		Boston University	L 67–70	0–14 (0–3)	Bender Arena (302); Washington, D.C.
January 11, 2025; 2:00 pm, ESPN+		at Bucknell	L 50–65	0–15 (0–4)	Sojka Pavilion (378); Lewisburg, PA
January 13, 2025; 4:00 pm, CBSSN		at Loyola (MD)	L 38–77	0–16 (0–5)	Reitz Arena (500); Baltimore, MD
January 18, 2025; 2:00 pm, ESPN+		Holy Cross	L 44–76	0–17 (0–6)	Bender Arena (590); Washington, D.C.
January 22, 2025; 6:00 pm, ESPN+		at Lehigh	L 55–61	0–18 (0–7)	Stabler Arena (732); Bethlehem, PA
January 25, 2025; 2:00 pm, ESPN+		at Colgate	L 43–85	0–19 (0–8)	Cotterell Court (303); Hamilton, NY
January 29, 2025; 7:00 pm, ESPN+		Lafayette	W 54–52	1–19 (1–8)	Bender Arena (477); Washington, D.C.
February 1, 2025; 1:00 pm, ESPN+		at Army	L 60–84	1–20 (1–9)	Christl Arena (558); West Point, NY
February 8, 2025; 2:00 pm, ESPN+		Lehigh	L 52–67	1–21 (1–10)	Bender Arena (923); Washington, D.C.
February 12, 2025; 6:00 pm, ESPN+		at Lafayette	L 55–72	1–22 (1–11)	Kirby Sports Center (347); Easton, PA
February 15, 2025; 12:30 pm, ESPN+		Loyola (MD)	L 39–68	1–23 (1–12)	Bender Arena (518); Washington, D.C.
February 19, 2025; 7:00 pm, ESPN+		Army	L 43–63	1–24 (1–13)	Bender Arena (394); Washington, D.C.
February 22, 2025; 2:00 pm, ESPN+		at Boston University	L 72–82	1–25 (1–14)	Case Gym (590); Boston, MA
February 26, 2025; 7:00 pm, ESPN+		at Navy	L 60–88	1–26 (1–15)	Alumni Hall (668); Annapolis, MD
March 1, 2025; 2:00 pm, ESPN+		Colgate	L 64–83	1–27 (1–16)	Bender Arena (912); Washington, D.C.
March 5, 2025; 7:00 pm, ESPN+		Bucknell	L 46–77	1–28 (1–17)	Bender Arena (676); Washington, D.C.
Patriot League tournament
March 8, 2025; 4:00 pm, ESPN+	(10)	at (7) Lafayette; First Round	L 53–87	1–29	Kirby Sports Center (342); Easton, PA
*Non-conference game. ^{#}Rankings from AP Poll. (#) Tournament seedings in parentheses. All times are in Eastern.
