= 2024–25 Lehigh Mountain Hawks women's basketball team =

American college basketball season

2024–25 Lehigh Mountain Hawks women's basketball

Patriot League regular-season & tournament champions

NCAA tournament, first round
- Conference: Patriot League
- Record: 27–7 (15–3 Patriot)
- Head coach: Addie Micir (3rd season)
- Associate head coach: Kaitlyn Cresencia
- Assistant coaches: Maddie Gallagher; Allison Chernow
- Home arena: Stabler Arena

2024–25 Patriot League women's basketball standings
	Conf.				Overall
Team	W		L	PCT	W		L	PCT
Lehigh †	15	–	3	.833	27	–	7	.794
Army	14	–	4	.778	25	–	8	.758
Colgate	13	–	5	.722	23	–	10	.697
Navy	11	–	7	.611	19	–	12	.613
Holy Cross	11	–	7	.611	19	–	12	.613
Bucknell	11	–	7	.611	17	–	14	.548
Lafayette	6	–	12	.333	10	–	21	.323
Boston University	5	–	13	.278	12	–	19	.387
Loyola	3	–	15	.167	9	–	21	.300
American	1	–	17	.056	1	–	29	.033
† 2025 Patriot League tournament winner

The 2024–25 Lehigh Mountain Hawks women's basketball team represent Lehigh University during the 2024–25 NCAA Division I women's basketball season. The Mountain Hawks, who were led by third-year head coach Addie Micir, played their home games at Stabler Arena located in Bethlehem, Pennsylvania, as members of the Patriot League.

Lehigh won the 2025 Patriot League women's basketball tournament, earning them an automatic bid to the 2025 NCAA Division I women's basketball tournament.

== Previous season ==
The Mountain Hawks finished the 2023–24 season 17–13, 9–9 in Patriot League play, to finish in a four-way tie for fifth place. They were defeated by Loyola (MD) in the quarterfinals of the Patriot League tournament.

== Preseason ==
On October 16, 2024, the Patriot League released their preseason coaches poll. Lehigh was picked to finish third in the Patriot League regular season.

=== Preseason rankings ===
Patriot League preseason poll
Predicted finish	Team	Votes (1st place)
1	Loyola (MD)	148 (10)
2	Colgate	120 (5)
3	Lehigh	109
4	Army	108 (1)
5	Boston University	106 (2)
6	Holy Cross	102 (2)
7	Navy	101
8	Bucknell	51
9	Lafayette	30
10	American	25

=== Preseason All-Patriot League Team ===
No Mountain Hawks were named to the Preseason All-Patriot League Team.

== Roster ==
2024–25 Lehigh Mountain Hawks women's basketball team
Players
Coaches

Pos.	#	Name	Height	Year	Previous school	Hometown
G/F	2	Remi Sisselman	6 ft 0 in (1.83 m)	Sr	Bucknell	Melville, NY
G	3	Sibelle Zambie	5 ft 9 in (1.75 m)	Fr	Greenhill School	Plano, TX
G	5	Ella Stemmer	5 ft 10 in (1.78 m)	Sr	Saline High School	Ann Arbor, MI
G/F	10	Katie Hurt	5 ft 11 in (1.8 m)	Jr	John Marshall High School	Rochester, MN
G	11	Keshia Vitalicio	5 ft 7 in (1.7 m)	Fr	Carondelet High School	Concord, CA
G/F	12	Belle Bramer	6 ft 1 in (1.85 m)	Fr	Archbishop Mitty High School	Los Gatos, CA
G	14	Kaylee Van Eps	6 ft 0 in (1.83 m)	Sr	Chaska High School	Chaska, MN
G	15	Jessie Ozzauto	5 ft 10 in (1.78 m)	So	Huntley High School	Algonquin, IL
G	22	Maddie Albrecht (5Y)	6 ft 0 in (1.83 m)	Sr	Billings West High School	Billings, MT
G	23	Gracyn Lovette	5 ft 10 in (1.78 m)	So	Marin Catholic High School	San Rafael, CA
F	30	Whitney Lind	6 ft 2 in (1.88 m)	So	Randall K. Cooper High School	Florence, KY
G	31	Colleen McQuillen	5 ft 10 in (1.78 m)	Sr	Fordham	Cresskill, NJ
F	33	Meghan O'Brien	6 ft 1 in (1.85 m)	Sr	Chantilly High School	Centreville, VA
F	34	Lily Fandre	6 ft 2 in (1.88 m)	Jr	Eagan High School	Eagan, MN

Head coach

- Addie Micir (Princeton)

Assistant coach(es)

- Kaitlyn Cresencia (Connecticut College)
- Maggie Gallagher (Marist)
- Allison Chernow (Emory)

Legend

- (C) Team captain
- (S) Suspended
- (I) Ineligible
- (W) Walk-on
- (5Y) Fifth-year senior
- Injured
- Current redshirt

Roster
Last update: March 18, 2025

== Schedule and results ==
Date time, TV	Rank^{#}	Opponent^{#}	Result	Record	Site (attendance) city, state
Non-conference regular season
November 4, 2024*; 6:00 p.m., ESPN+		LIU	W 83–59	1–0	Stabler Arena (467); Bethlehem, PA
November 8, 2024*; 7:00 p.m., B1G+		at Michigan	L 55–86	1–1	Crisler Center (2,747); Ann Arbor, MI
November 10, 2024*; 3:00 p.m., B1G+		at Northwestern	W 85–68	2–1	Welsh–Ryan Arena (1,166); Evanston, IL
November 17, 2024*; 12:00 p.m., ESPN+		at Brown	W 62–55	3–1	Pizzitola Sports Center (321); Providence, RI
November 22, 2024*; 6:00 p.m., ESPN+		Hofstra	W 80–61	4–1	Stabler Arena (488); Bethlehem, PA
November 26, 2024*; 4:30 p.m., ESPN+		at La Salle	L 62–65	4–2	John Glaser Arena (286); Philadelphia, PA
November 30, 2024*; 12:00 p.m., ESPN+		Marist; Christmas City Classic	W 56–39	5–2	Stabler Arena (482); Bethlehem, PA
December 1, 2024*; 2:30 p.m., ESPN+		Valparaiso; Christmas City Classic	W 77–59	6–2	Stabler Arena (426); Bethlehem, PA
December 4, 2024*; 6:00 p.m., FloHoops		at Drexel	L 44–53	6–3	Daskalakis Athletic Center (359); Philadelphia, PA
December 8, 2024*; 1:00 p.m., ESPN+		at Cornell	W 73–51	7–3	Newman Arena (245); Ithaca, NY
December 21, 2024*; 12:00 p.m., ESPN+		Wofford	W 69–64	8–3	Stabler Arena (512); Bethlehem, PA
December 29, 2024*; 1:00 p.m., ESPN+		Misericordia	W 81–22	9–3	Stabler Arena (628); Bethlehem, PA
Patriot League regular season
January 2, 2025; 6:00 p.m., ESPN+		at Bucknell	W 65–53	10–3 (1–0)	Sojka Pavilion (287); Lewisburg, PA
January 5, 2025; 2:00 p.m., ESPN+		Loyola (MD)	W 74–66	11–3 (2–0)	Stabler Arena (493); Bethlehem, PA
January 8, 2025; 6:00 p.m., ESPN+		Colgate	L 66–70	11–4 (2–1)	Stabler Arena (530); Bethlehem, PA
January 12, 2025; 1:00 p.m., ESPN+		at Army	W 90–51	12–4 (3–1)	Christl Arena (450); West Point, NY
January 15, 2025; 6:00 p.m., ESPN+		Boston University	W 80–54	13–4 (4–1)	Stabler Arena (563); Bethlehem, PA
January 18, 2025; 5:00 p.m., ESPN+		at Loyola (MD)	W 54–43	14–4 (5–1)	Reitz Arena (245); Baltimore, MD
January 22, 2025; 6:00 p.m., ESPN+		American	W 61–55	15–4 (6–1)	Stabler Arena (732); Bethlehem, PA
January 25, 2025; 4:30 p.m., ESPN+		Lafayette	W 73–51	16–4 (7–1)	Stabler Arena (1,747); Bethlehem, PA
January 29, 2025; 7:00 p.m., ESPN+		at Navy	W 87–66	17–4 (8–1)	Alumni Hall (557); Annapolis, MD
February 1, 2025; 5:00 p.m., ESPN+		Holy Cross	W 60–47	18–4 (9–1)	Stabler Arena (941); Bethlehem, PA
February 8, 2025; 2:00 p.m., ESPN+		at American	W 67–52	19–4 (10–1)	Bender Arena (923); Washington, D.C.
February 12, 2025; 6:00 p.m., ESPN+		Navy	W 74–56	20–4 (11–1)	Stabler Arena (623); Bethlehem, PA
February 15, 2025; 2:00 p.m., ESPN+		at Holy Cross	W 69–59 ^{OT}	21–4 (12–1)	Hart Center (1,006); Worcester, MA
February 19, 2025; 6:00 p.m., ESPN+		Bucknell	W 73–59	22–4 (13–1)	Stabler Arena (714); Bethlehem, PA
February 22, 2025; 2:00 p.m., ESPN+		at Lafayette	W 75–61	23–4 (14–1)	Kirby Sports Center (883); Easton, PA
February 26, 2025; 6:00 p.m., ESPN+		at Boston University	L 68–80	23–5 (14–2)	Case Gym (720); Boston, MA
March 1, 2025; 2:00 p.m., ESPN+		Army	W 76–61	24–5 (15–2)	Stabler Arena (866); Bethlehem, PA
March 5, 2025; 6:00 p.m., ESPN+		at Colgate	L 59–78	24–6 (15–3)	Cotterell Court (461); Hamilton, NY
Patriot League tournament
March 10, 2025; 6:00 p.m., ESPN+	(1)	(8) Boston University; Quarterfinals	W 62–44	25–6	Stabler Arena (826); Bethlehem, PA
March 13, 2025; 6:00 p.m., ESPN+	(1)	(5) Holy Cross; Semifinals	W 65–44	26–6	Stabler Arena (868); Bethlehem, PA
March 16, 2025; 12:00 p.m., CBSSN	(1)	(2) Army; Championship	W 74–62	27–6	Stabler Arena (1,515); Bethlehem, PA
NCAA tournament
March 21, 2025; 8:00 p.m., ESPNU	(15 B2)	at (2 B2) No. 7 Duke; First round	L 25–86	27–7	Cameron Indoor Stadium (4,280); Durham, NC
*Non-conference game. ^{#}Rankings from AP poll. (#) Tournament seedings in parentheses. All times are in Eastern.
