= 2024–25 Lafayette Leopards women's basketball team =

American college basketball season

2024–25 Lafayette Leopards women's basketball
- Conference: Patriot League
- Record: 10–21 (6–12 Patriot)
- Head coach: Kia Damon-Olson (8th season)
- Assistant coaches: Tom Lochner; John Hannafin; Lauren Hammersley; Jamarra Robinson
- Home arena: Kirby Sports Center

2024–25 Patriot League women's basketball standings
	Conf.				Overall
Team	W		L	PCT	W		L	PCT
Lehigh †	15	–	3	.833	27	–	7	.794
Army	14	–	4	.778	25	–	8	.758
Colgate	13	–	5	.722	23	–	10	.697
Navy	11	–	7	.611	19	–	12	.613
Holy Cross	11	–	7	.611	19	–	12	.613
Bucknell	11	–	7	.611	17	–	14	.548
Lafayette	6	–	12	.333	10	–	21	.323
Boston University	5	–	13	.278	12	–	19	.387
Loyola	3	–	15	.167	9	–	21	.300
American	1	–	17	.056	1	–	29	.033
† 2025 Patriot League tournament winner

The 2024–25 Lafayette Leopards women's basketball team represented Lafayette College during the 2024–25 NCAA Division I women's basketball season. The Leopards, who were led by eighth-year head coach Kia Damon-Olson, played their home games at the Kirby Sports Center in Easton, Pennsylvania, as members of the Patriot League.

== Previous season ==
The Leopards finished the 2023–24 season 10–20, 5–13 in Patriot League play, to finish in last place. They were defeated by Navy in the first round of the Patriot League tournament.

== Preseason ==
On October 16, 2024, the Patriot League released their preseason coaches poll. Lafayette was picked to finish ninth in the Patriot League regular season.

=== Preseason rankings ===
Patriot League preseason poll
Predicted finish	Team	Votes (1st place)
1	Loyola (MD)	148 (10)
2	Colgate	120 (5)
3	Lehigh	109
4	Army	108 (1)
5	Boston University	106 (2)
6	Holy Cross	102 (2)
7	Navy	101
8	Bucknell	51
9	Lafayette	30
10	American	25

=== Preseason All-Patriot League Team ===
No Leopards were named to the Preseason All-Patriot League Team.

== Roster ==
2024–25 Lafayette Leopards women's basketball team
Players
Coaches

Pos.	#	Name	Height	Year	Previous school	Hometown
G	0	Talia Zurinskas	5 ft 7 in (1.7 m)	Fr	Parkland High School	Allentown, Pennsylvania
G	1	Abby Antognoli	5 ft 7 in (1.7 m)	Sr	St. Rose High School	Bay Head, New Jersey
F	2	Emma Shields	6 ft 3 in (1.91 m)	Jr	Emma Willard School	Troy, New York
G	4	Kylie Favours	5 ft 9 in (1.75 m)	Sr	Rutgers Prep	Old Bridge, New Jersey
F	10	Tasha Chudy	6 ft 2 in (1.88 m)	So	Saratoga Springs High School	Saratoga Springs, New York
F	11	Mingaile Urmuleviciute	6 ft 3 in (1.91 m)	Jr	Trinity Collegiate School	Kaunas, Lithuania
G	12	Teresa Kiewiet	5 ft 10 in (1.78 m)	So	Mankato West High School	North Mankato, Minnesota
G	15	Kay Donahue	5 ft 10 in (1.78 m)	Jr	Montgomery High School	Belle Mead, New Jersey
G	22	Rosie Scognamiglio	5 ft 10 in (1.78 m)	So	St. Rose High School	Bradley Beach, New Jersey
F	23	Jordyn Mays	6 ft 2 in (1.88 m)	Fr	Travis High School	Richmond, Texas
G	24	Sauda Ntaconayigize	5 ft 11 in (1.8 m)	Jr	Champlain Regional College	Quebec City, Quebec
G	32	Halee Smith	5 ft 10 in (1.78 m)	Sr	Quinnipiac	Alexandria, Pennsylvania
F	44	Brynn Beffert	6 ft 1 in (1.85 m)	So	Hutchinson High School	Hutchinson, Minnesota

Head coach

- Kia Damon-Olson (Millersville)

Assistant coach(es)

- Tom Lochner (Temple)
- John Hannafin (Springfield)
- Lauren Hammersley (Assumption)
- Jamarra Robinson (Saint Leo)

Legend

- (C) Team captain
- (S) Suspended
- (I) Ineligible
- (W) Walk-on
- Injured
- Current redshirt

Roster
Last update: May 13, 2025

== Schedule and results ==
Date time, TV	Rank^{#}	Opponent^{#}	Result	Record	Site (attendance) city, state
Non-conference regular season
November 4, 2024*; 5:00 pm, ACCNX		at Boston College	L 55–85	0–1	Conte Forum (510); Chestnut Hill, MA
November 9, 2024*; 2:00 pm, ESPN+		Saint Francis	W 53–45	1–1	Kirby Sports Center (246); Easton, PA
November 13, 2024*; 7:00 pm, ESPN+		at Marist	L 41–73	1–2	McCann Arena (861); Poughkeepsie, NY
November 17, 2024*; 2:00 pm, ESPN+/NBCSP		No. 6 Notre Dame	L 55–91	1–3	Kirby Sports Center (2,329); Easton, PA
November 22, 2024*; 7:00 pm, ESPN+		at No. 13 West Virginia	L 28–98	1–4	WVU Coliseum (3,042); Morgantown, WV
November 26, 2024*; 7:00 pm, ESPN+		at NJIT	W 71–69	2–4	Wellness and Events Center (375); Newark, NJ
December 1, 2024*; 2:00 pm, FloHoops/NBCSP		at Monmouth	L 54–60	2–5	OceanFirst Bank Center (687); West Long Branch, NJ
December 4, 2024*; 6:00 pm, ESPN+		Fairleigh Dickinson	L 62–69	2–6	Kirby Sports Center (246); Easton, PA
December 8, 2024*; 2:00 pm, ESPN+		Wagner	W 74–45	3–6	Kirby Sports Center (207); Easton, PA
December 18, 2024*; 6:00 pm, ESPN+		Dartmouth	L 47–60	3–7	Kirby Sports Center (164); Easton, PA
December 21, 2024*; 12:00 pm, B1G+		at Rutgers	L 65–72	3–8	Jersey Mike's Arena (1,858); Piscataway, NJ
Patriot League regular season
January 2, 2025; 2:00 pm, ESPN+		at Boston University	W 66–55	4–8 (1–0)	Case Gym (261); Boston, MA
January 5, 2025; 2:00 pm, ESPN+		Navy	L 49–71	4–9 (1–1)	Kirby Sports Center (274); Easton, PA
January 8, 2025; 6:00 pm, ESPN+		Bucknell	L 48–64	4–10 (1–2)	Kirby Sports Center (165); Easton, PA
January 11, 2025; 2:00 pm, ESPN+		at Holy Cross	L 69–75	4–11 (1–3)	Hart Center (753); Worcester, MA
January 15, 2025; 11:00 am, ESPN+/NBCSP		Army	L 65–74	4–12 (1–4)	Kirby Sports Center (1,829); Easton, PA
January 18, 2025; 2:00 pm, ESPN+		at Colgate	L 56–72	4–13 (1–5)	Cotterell Court (208); Hamilton, NY
January 22, 2025; 6:00 pm, ESPN+		Loyola (MD)	W 60–59	5–13 (2–5)	Kirby Sports Center (186); Easton, PA
January 25, 2025; 4:30 pm, ESPN+		at Lehigh	L 51–73	5–14 (2–6)	Stabler Arena (1,747); Bethlehem, PA
January 29, 2025; 7:00 pm, ESPN+		at American	L 52–54	5–15 (2–7)	Bender Arena (477); Washington, D.C.
February 1, 2025; 2:00 pm, ESPN+/NBCSP		Colgate	L 44–75	5–16 (2–8)	Kirby Sports Center (668); Easton, PA
February 8, 2025; 4:00 pm, ESPN+		at Navy	W 61–60	6–16 (3–8)	Alumni Hall (1,033); Annapolis, MD
February 12, 2025; 6:00 pm, ESPN+		American	W 72–55	7–16 (4–8)	Kirby Sports Center (347); Easton, PA
February 15, 2025; 2:00 pm, ESPN+		at Bucknell	L 51–62	7–17 (4–9)	Sojka Pavilion (206); Lewisburg, PA
February 19, 2025; 6:00 pm, ESPN+/NBCSP		Holy Cross	L 42–83	7–18 (4–10)	Kirby Sports Center (463); Easton, PA
February 22, 2025; 2:00 pm, ESPN+		Lehigh	L 61–75	7–19 (4–11)	Kirby Sports Center (883); Easton, PA
February 26, 2025; 3:00 pm, ESPN+		at Army	L 48–75	7–20 (4–12)	Christl Arena (472); West Point, NY
March 1, 2025; 2:00 pm, ESPN+		Boston University	W 63–58	8–20 (5–12)	Kirby Sports Center (326); Easton, PA
March 5, 2025; 7:00 pm, ESPN+		at Loyola (MD)	W 57–54	9–20 (6–12)	Reitz Arena (241); Baltimore, MD
Patriot League tournament
March 8, 2025; 4:00 pm, ESPN+	(7)	(10) American; First Round	W 87–53	10–20	Kirby Sports Center (342); Easton, PA
March 10, 2025; 6:00 pm, ESPN+	(7)	at (2) Army; Quarterfinals	L 40–55	10–21	Christl Arena; West Point, NY
*Non-conference game. ^{#}Rankings from AP Poll. (#) Tournament seedings in parentheses. All times are in Eastern.
