= Melissa Graves =

American basketball coach and former player

Current position
- Title: Head coach
- Team: Boston University
- Conference: Patriot
- Record: 84–74 (.532)

Biographical details
- Born: May 10, 1986 (age 40); Brookhaven, New York, U.S.

Playing career
- 2004–2008: Notre Dame
- Position: Center

Coaching career (HC unless noted)
- 2013–2015: Colgate (assistant)
- 2015–2018: Yale (assistant)
- 2018–2021: Wake Forest (assistant)
- 2021–present: Boston University

Head coaching record
- Overall: 84–74 (.532)
- Tournaments: 0–1 (WNIT)

Accomplishments and honors

Championships
- Patriot League regular season (2023)

Awards
- Patriot League Coach of the Year (2023)

Melissa Graves (née D'Amico; born May 10, 1986) is an American basketball coach and former player who is currently the head women's basketball coach at Boston University, a role she has held since 2021.

== Playing career ==
Graves played college basketball at Notre Dame before playing professionally overseas in Spain, China, Greece, Poland, and the Czech Republic.

=== Notre Dame statistics ===
Legend
GP	Games played	GS	Games started	MPG	Minutes per game
FG%	Field goal percentage	3P%	3-point field goal percentage	FT%	Free throw percentage
RPG	Rebounds per game	APG	Assists per game	SPG	Steals per game
BPG	Blocks per game	PPG	Points per game	**Bold**	Career high

Year	Team	GP	Points	FG%	3P%	FT%	RPG	APG	SPG	BPG	PPG
2004–05	Notre Dame	26	49	43.8%	-	43.8%	1.4	0.2	0.1	0.5	1.9
2005–06	Notre Dame	30	177	46.8%	-	54.1%	3.7	0.5	0.4	**1.2**	5.9
2006–07	Notre Dame	**33**	**256**	52.8%	-	78.7%	**4.6**	**0.5**	**0.5**	0.9	**8.0**
2007–08	Notre Dame	31	88	**54.0%**	-	**80.0%**	2.0	0.3	0.3	0.6	2.8
Career		119	570	50.0%	-	66.3%	3.0	0.4	0.3	0.8	4.8

== Coaching career ==
Graves began her coaching career as an assistant coach at Colgate in 2013. She was named an assistant at Yale in 2015, during which she was named to the Women's Basketball Coaches Association's "Thirty Under 30" list. and was later named an assistant at Wake Forest in 2018.

=== Boston University ===
Graves was named the head coach at Boston University on April 26, 2021.

== Head coaching record ==
Record table
Season	Team	Overall	Conference	Standing	Postseason
Boston University Terriers (Patriot League) (2021–present)
2021–22	Boston University	17–14	12–6	T–3rd	
2022–23	Boston University	24–9	17–1	1st	WNIT First Round
2023–24	Boston University	20–12	10–8	T–2nd	
2024–25	Boston University	12–19	5–13	8th	
2025–26	Boston University	11–20	6–12	8th	
Boston University:		84–74 (.532)	50–40 (.556)		
Total:		84–74 (.532)			
National champion Postseason invitational champion Conference regular season champion Conference regular season and conference tournament champion Division regular season champion Division regular season and conference tournament champion Conference tournament champion
