= 2025 Patriot League women's basketball tournament =

Conference postseason tournament

- Classification: Division I
- Season: 2024–25
- Teams: 10
- Site: Campus sites
- Television: ESPN+, CBSSN

2024–25 Patriot League women's basketball standings
	Conf.				Overall
Team	W		L	PCT	W		L	PCT
Lehigh †	15	–	3	.833	27	–	7	.794
Army	14	–	4	.778	25	–	8	.758
Colgate	13	–	5	.722	23	–	10	.697
Navy	11	–	7	.611	19	–	12	.613
Holy Cross	11	–	7	.611	19	–	12	.613
Bucknell	11	–	7	.611	17	–	14	.548
Lafayette	6	–	12	.333	10	–	21	.323
Boston University	5	–	13	.278	12	–	19	.387
Loyola	3	–	15	.167	9	–	21	.300
American	1	–	17	.056	1	–	29	.033
† 2025 Patriot League tournament winner

The 2025 Patriot League Women's Basketball Tournament was the conference postseason tournament for the Patriot League. The tournament was held March 8-16, 2025 at campus sites of the higher seeds. The winner received the conference's automatic bid to the NCAA Tournament.

== Seeds ==
All ten teams in the conference standings qualified for the tournament. The teams were seeded by record in conference, with a tiebreaker system to seed teams with identical conference records.

The first tiebreaker is the head-to-head records of the tied teams. If teams remain tied, the tied teams' records against the highest seeded Patriot League team not involved in the tie are compared, provided each of the tied teams played that team at least once. If the tied teams have identical winning percentages against the highest seeded team, the process works its way down the standings. Since ties are resolved sequentially starting with the no. 1 seed, teams seeded above the tied teams are considered separately rather than as a group, even if they have identical records. If the teams remain tied, the NCAA NET rankings available on the day following the conclusion of Patriot League regular-season play are used. In the event tied teams have identical NET rankings, the tied teams' winning percentages against non-Patriot League common opponents are compared. If the tie involves three or more teams, and one or more teams are superior or inferior to the others after any step, but three or more teams remain tied, the multiple-team tiebreaker process continues and does not revert to a new multiple-team tiebreaker. Multiple-team tiebreakers revert to a two-team tiebreaker, when the number of tied teams is reduced to two. In the prior season, multiple-team tiebreakers continued until they were completely resolved, even if only two teams remained tied.

Once a team is eliminated from a multiple-team tiebreaker, either by demonstrating superiority or inferiority to the remaining tied teams, it is treated as if it had not been involved in the initial tie for the purposes of applying the remaining steps in continuing the tiebreaker procedure, and such team is seeded according to the tiebreaker result.

Seed	School	Conference	Tiebreaker 1	Tiebreaker 2
1	Lehigh	15–3		
2	Army	14–4		
3	Colgate	13–5		
4	Navy	11–7	4–0 vs. Holy Cross/Bucknell	
5	Holy Cross	11–7	2–0 vs. Bucknell	
6	Bucknell	11–7	0–2 vs. Holy Cross	
7	Lafayette	6–12		
8	Boston University	5–13		
9	Loyola	3–15		
10	American	1–17		

== Schedule ==
Game	Time	Matchup	Score	Television	Attendance
First round – Saturday, March 8
1	4:00 pm	No. 7 Lafayette vs. No. 10 American	75–51	ESPN+	
2	2:00 pm	No. 8 Boston University vs. No. 9 Loyola	87–53	ESPN+	
Quarterfinals – Monday, March 10
3	6:00 pm	No. 1 Lehigh vs. No. 8 Boston University	62–44	ESPN+	
4	6:00 pm	No. 2 Army vs. No. 7 Lafayette	55–40	ESPN+	
5	6:00 pm	No. 3 Colgate vs. No. 6 Bucknell	58–63	ESPN+	
6	6:00 pm	No. 4 Navy vs. No. 5 Holy Cross	52–66	ESPN+	
Semifinals – Thursday, March 13
7	6:00 pm	No. 1 Lehigh vs. No. 5 Holy Cross	65–44	ESPN+	
8	6:00 pm	No. 2 Army vs. No. 6 Bucknell	49–39	ESPN+	
Championship – Sunday, March 16
9	12:00 pm	No. 1 Lehigh vs. No. 2 Army	74–62	CBSSN	
*Game times in ET (UTC−5 for the first round and UTC−4 for the quarterfinals, semifinals, and championship). Rankings denote tournament seed. All games hosted by higher-seeded team.

== Bracket ==
First round Saturday, March 8 ESPN+
8	Boston University	75
9	Loyola	51
7	Lafayette	87
10	American	53

Quarterfinals; Monday, March 10; ESPN+
1	Lehigh	62
8	Boston University	44
4	Navy	52
5	Holy Cross	66
2	Army	55
7	Lafayette	40
3	Colgate	58
6	Bucknell	63

Semifinals; Thursday, March 13; ESPN+
1	Lehigh	65
5	Holy Cross	49
2	Army	49
6	Bucknell	39

Championship; Sunday, March 16; CBSSN
1	Lehigh	74
2	Army	62
