= 2024–25 Bucknell Bison women's basketball team =

American college basketball season

2024–25 Bucknell Bison women's basketball
- Conference: Patriot League
- Record: 17–14 (11–7 Patriot)
- Head coach: Trevor Woodruff (6th season)
- Associate head coach: Sherill Baker
- Assistant coaches: Owen Brown; Shelby Case; Edward Joyner Jr.
- Home arena: Sojka Pavilion

2024–25 Patriot League women's basketball standings
	Conf.				Overall
Team	W		L	PCT	W		L	PCT
Lehigh †	15	–	3	.833	27	–	7	.794
Army	14	–	4	.778	25	–	8	.758
Colgate	13	–	5	.722	23	–	10	.697
Navy	11	–	7	.611	19	–	12	.613
Holy Cross	11	–	7	.611	19	–	12	.613
Bucknell	11	–	7	.611	17	–	14	.548
Lafayette	6	–	12	.333	10	–	21	.323
Boston University	5	–	13	.278	12	–	19	.387
Loyola	3	–	15	.167	9	–	21	.300
American	1	–	17	.056	1	–	29	.033
† 2025 Patriot League tournament winner

The 2024–25 Bucknell Bison women's basketball team represented Bucknell University during the 2024–25 NCAA Division I women's basketball season. The Bison, who were led by sixth-year head coach Trevor Woodruff, played their home games at Sojka Pavilion in Lewisburg, Pennsylvania as members of the Patriot League.

== Previous season ==
The Bison finished the 2023–24 season 13–18, 9–9 in Patriot League play, to finish in a four-way tie for fifth place. They defeated American, before falling to top-seeded and eventual tournament champions Holy Cross in the quarterfinals of the Patriot League tournament.

== Preseason ==
On October 16, 2024, the Patriot League released their preseason coaches poll. Bucknell was picked to finish eighth in the Patriot League regular season.

=== Preseason rankings ===
Patriot League preseason poll
Predicted finish	Team	Votes (1st place)
1	Loyola (MD)	148 (10)
2	Colgate	120 (5)
3	Lehigh	109
4	Army	108 (1)
5	Boston University	106 (2)
6	Holy Cross	102 (2)
7	Navy	101
8	Bucknell	51
9	Lafayette	30
10	American	25

=== Preseason All-Patriot League Team ===
Preseason All-Patriot League Team
Player	Position	Year
Ashley Sofilkanich	Forward	Sophomore

=== Preseason Defensive Player of the Year ===
Preseason Defensive Player of the Year
Player	Position	Year
Ashley Sofilkanich	Forward	Sophomore

== Roster ==
2024–25 Bucknell Bison women's basketball team
Players
Coaches

Pos.	#	Name	Height	Year	Previous school	Hometown
F	0	Elena Houghton	6 ft 1 in (1.85 m)	Jr	Sam Houston	Washington, D.C.
G	2	Isabella Casey	5 ft 10 in (1.78 m)	Fr	Germantown Academy	Radnor, Pennsylvania
F	4	Desirae Ashton	6 ft 0 in (1.83 m)	Fr	Bishop Ireton High School	Fredericksburg, Virginia
F	7	Julia Heiden	6 ft 3 in (1.91 m)	Fr	Kitas Gymnasium	Gothenburg, Sweden
G/F	10	Isabella King	6 ft 0 in (1.83 m)	Sr	Bedford High School	Bedford, New Hampshire
F	12	Ashley Sofilkanich	6 ft 3 in (1.91 m)	So	St. John Vianney High School	South Amboy, New Jersey
G	13	Hope Masonius	5 ft 9 in (1.75 m)	Fr	Manasquan High School	Spring Lake, New Jersey
G/F	20	Reese Zemitis	6 ft 0 in (1.83 m)	Fr	Neshaminy High School	Langhorne, Pennsylvania
G	21	Anna Kunzwiler	5 ft 9 in (1.75 m)	So	Stetson	Leesburg, Virginia
G	22	Sophia Sabino	5 ft 9 in (1.75 m)	RS Jr	Fordham	Rumson, New Jersey
F	23	Tuana Coskun	6 ft 0 in (1.83 m)	So	Robert Morris	Istanbul, Turkey
G/F	33	Elana Weisman	6 ft 2 in (1.88 m)	Fr	Archbishop Mitty High School	Burlingame, California

Head coach

- Trevor Woodruff (Misericordia)

Assistant coach(es)

- Sherill Baker (Georgia)
- Owen Brown (San Francisco)
- Shelby Case (UIC)
- Edward Joyner Jr. (Hampton)

Legend

- (C) Team captain
- (S) Suspended
- (I) Ineligible
- (W) Walk-on
- Injured
- Current redshirt

Roster
Last update: May 13, 2025

== Schedule and results ==
Date time, TV	Rank^{#}	Opponent^{#}	Result	Record	Site (attendance) city, state
Non-conference regular season
November 4, 2024*; 5:00 pm, B1G+		at Penn State	L 68–90	0–1	Bryce Jordan Center (1,575); University Park, PA
November 9, 2024*; 1:00 pm, ACCNX		at Pittsburgh	L 61–64	0–2	Petersen Events Center (347); Pittsburgh, PA
November 13, 2024*; 7:00 pm, NEC Front Row		at Fairleigh Dickinson	L 56–67	0–3	Bogota Savings Bank Center (287); Hackensack, NJ
November 16, 2024*; 7:00 pm, ESPN+		at Merrimack	L 59–62	0–4	Lawler Arena (247); North Andover, MA
November 20, 2024*; 6:00 pm, ESPN+		Mount St. Mary's	W 63–47	1–4	Sojka Pavilion (289); Lewisburg, PA
November 23, 2024*; 11:00 am, ESPN+		Youngstown State	W 51–36	2–4	Sojka Pavilion (198); Lewisburg, PA
November 29, 2024*; 2:00 pm, ESPN+		at Robert Morris	W 65–54	3–4	UPMC Events Center (221); Moon Township, PA
December 4, 2024*; 11:00 am, ESPN+		Vermont	W 62–59 ^{OT}	4–4	Sojka Pavilion (1,596); Lewisburg, PA
December 6, 2024*; 6:00 pm, ESPN+		Dartmouth	W 53–50	5–4	Sojka Pavilion (258); Lewisburg, PA
December 10, 2024*; 6:00 pm, ESPN+		at Duquesne	L 48–65	5–5	UPMC Cooper Fieldhouse (662); Pittsburgh, PA
December 21, 2024*; 2:00 pm, ESPN+		Hofstra	L 71–76 ^{OT}	5–6	Sojka Pavilion (247); Lewisburg, PA
Patriot League regular season
January 2, 2025; 6:00 pm, ESPN+		Lehigh	L 53–65	5–7 (0–1)	Sojka Pavilion (287); Lewisburg, PA
January 5, 2025; 2:00 pm, ESPN+		at Colgate	W 51–34	6–7 (1–1)	Cotterell Court (278); Hamilton, NY
January 8, 2025; 6:00 pm, ESPN+		at Lafayette	W 64–48	7–7 (2–1)	Kirby Sports Center (165); Easton, PA
January 11, 2025; 2:00 pm, ESPN+		American	W 65–50	8–7 (3–1)	Sojka Pavilion (378); Lewisburg, PA
January 15, 2025; 6:00 pm, ESPN+		at Holy Cross	L 37–63	8–8 (3–2)	Hart Center (601); Worcester, MA
January 18, 2025; 1:00 pm, ESPN+		at Navy	L 47–49	8–9 (3–3)	Alumni Hall (678); Annapolis, MD
January 22, 2025; 6:00 pm, ESPN+		Colgate	W 71–67 ^{OT}	9–9 (4–3)	Sojka Pavilion (294); Lewisburg, PA
January 25, 2025; 2:00 pm, ESPN+		Boston University	W 74–59	10–9 (5–3)	Sojka Pavilion (268); Lewisburg, PA
January 29, 2025; 7:00 pm, ESPN+		at Loyola (MD)	W 54–49	11–9 (6–3)	Reitz Arena (230); Baltimore, MD
February 1, 2025; 4:00 pm, ESPN+		Navy	L 75–79 ^{OT}	11–10 (6–4)	Sojka Pavilion (421); Lewisburg, PA
February 8, 2025; 12:00 pm, ESPN+		Army	W 75–65	12–10 (7–4)	Sojka Pavilion (439); Lewisburg, PA
February 12, 2025; 6:00 pm, ESPN+		at Boston University	W 67–63	13–10 (8–4)	Case Gym (393); Boston, MA
February 15, 2025; 2:00 pm, ESPN+		Lafayette	W 62–51	14–10 (9–4)	Sojka Pavilion (206); Lewisburg, PA
February 19, 2025; 6:00 pm, ESPN+		at Lehigh	L 59–73	14–11 (9–5)	Stabler Arena (714); Bethlehem, PA
February 22, 2025; 12:00 pm, ESPN+		at Army	L 54–69	14–12 (9–6)	Christl Arena (673); West Point, NY
February 26, 2025; 6:00 pm, ESPN+		Loyola (MD)	W 79–45	15–12 (10–6)	Sojka Pavilion (266); Lewisburg, PA
March 1, 2025; 2:00 pm, ESPN+		Holy Cross	L 60–67	15–13 (10–7)	Sojka Pavilion (614); Lewisburg, PA
March 5, 2025; 7:00 pm, ESPN+		at American	W 77–46	16–13 (11–7)	Bender Arena (676); Washington, D.C.
Patriot League tournament
March 10, 2025; 6:00 pm, ESPN+	(6)	at (3) Colgate; Quarterfinals	W 63–58	17–13	Cotterell Court (573); Hamilton, NY
March 13, 2025; 6:00 pm, ESPN+	(6)	at (2) Army; Semifinals	L 39–49	17–14	Christl Arena (888); West Point, NY
*Non-conference game. ^{#}Rankings from AP Poll. (#) Tournament seedings in parentheses. All times are in Eastern.
