= 2024–25 Holy Cross Crusaders women's basketball team =

American college basketball season

2024–25 Holy Cross Crusaders women's basketball
- Conference: Patriot League
- Record: 19–12 (11–7 Patriot)
- Head coach: Candice Green (1st season)
- Assistant coaches: Kat Fogarty; Paige Corkins
- Home arena: Hart Center

2024–25 Patriot League women's basketball standings
| | Conf. | | | | Overall |
| Team | W | | L | PCT | W | | L | PCT |
|---|---|---|---|---|---|---|---|---|
| Lehigh † | 15 | – | 3 | .833 | 27 | – | 7 | .794 |
| Army | 14 | – | 4 | .778 | 25 | – | 8 | .758 |
| Colgate | 13 | – | 5 | .722 | 23 | – | 10 | .697 |
| Navy | 11 | – | 7 | .611 | 19 | – | 12 | .613 |
| Holy Cross | 11 | – | 7 | .611 | 19 | – | 12 | .613 |
| Bucknell | 11 | – | 7 | .611 | 17 | – | 14 | .548 |
| Lafayette | 6 | – | 12 | .333 | 10 | – | 21 | .323 |
| Boston University | 5 | – | 13 | .278 | 12 | – | 19 | .387 |
| Loyola | 3 | – | 15 | .167 | 9 | – | 21 | .300 |
| American | 1 | – | 17 | .056 | 1 | – | 29 | .033 |
† 2025 Patriot League tournament winner

The 2024–25 Holy Cross Crusaders women's basketball team represented the College of the Holy Cross during the 2024–25 NCAA Division I women's basketball season. The Crusaders, who were led by first-year head coach Candice Green, played their home games at the Hart Center in Worcester, Massachusetts as members of the Patriot League.

The Crusaders finished the season 19–12, 11–7 in Patriot League play, to finish in a three-way tie for fourth place. They defeated in Navy in the quarterfinals of the Patriot League tournament before being eliminated by Lehigh in the semifinals.

== Previous season ==
The Crusaders finished the 2023–24 season 21–13, 11–7 in Patriot League play, to finish as the Patriot League regular-season champions. They defeated Bucknell, Loyola (MD) and Boston University to win the Patriot League tournament championship for the second consecutive year, to earn the Patriot League's automatic bid to the NCAA tournament. They received the #16 seed in the Albany Regional 2, where they defeated fellow #16 seed UT Martin in the First Four before falling to top region seed and eventual tournament runner-up Iowa in the first round.

On August 20, 2024, head coach Maureen Magarity announced that she would be stepping down from her head coaching position after four seasons, citing family reasons, with assistant coach Candice Green being named the interim head coach for the 2024–25 season.

== Preseason ==
On October 16, 2024, the Patriot League released their preseason coaches poll. Holy Cross was picked to finish sixth in the Patriot League regular season.

=== Preseason rankings ===
Patriot League preseason poll
| Predicted finish | Team | Votes (1st place) |
|---|---|---|
| 1 | Loyola (MD) | 148 (10) |
| 2 | Colgate | 120 (5) |
| 3 | Lehigh | 109 |
| 4 | Army | 108 (1) |
| 5 | Boston University | 106 (2) |
| 6 | Holy Cross | 102 (2) |
| 7 | Navy | 101 |
| 8 | Bucknell | 51 |
| 9 | Lafayette | 30 |
| 10 | American | 25 |

=== Preseason All-Patriot League Team ===
No Crusaders were named to the Preseason All-Patriot League Team.

== Roster ==
2024–25 Holy Cross Crusaders women's basketball team
Players
Coaches

| Pos. | # | Name | Height | Year | Previous school | Hometown |
|---|---|---|---|---|---|---|
| F | 4 | Meg Cahalan | 6 ft 2 in (1.88 m) | Jr | St. John Vianney High School | Middletown, NJ |
| G | 5 | Kaitlyn Flanagan | 5 ft 8 in (1.73 m) | Jr | Plymouth-Whitemarsh High School | Plymouth Meeting, PA |
| G | 10 | Stella Gougoufkas | 5 ft 9 in (1.75 m) | Fr | James Madison High School | Vienna, VA |
| G | 21 | Janie Bachmann | 6 ft 0 in (1.83 m) | So | St. John Vianney High School | Holmdel, NJ |
| F | 22 | Simone Lewis | 6 ft 0 in (1.83 m) | So | Georgetown Visitation Prep | Lanham, MD |
| G | 23 | Grace Munt | 5 ft 11 in (1.8 m) | Sr | Rumson-Fair Haven Regional High School | Fair Haven, NJ |
| G | 24 | Simone Foreman | 5 ft 9 in (1.75 m) | Jr | St. Andrew's Episcopal School | Odenton, MD |
| G | 25 | Hannah Griffin | 5 ft 6 in (1.68 m) | So | Gwynedd Mercy Academy | Conshohocken, PA |
| G | 32 | Kendall Eddy | 5 ft 7 in (1.7 m) | So | Providence | Haverhill, MA |
| G | 33 | Mary-Elizabeth Donnelly | 6 ft 0 in (1.83 m) | Jr | Manasquan High School | Manasquan, NJ |
| G | 34 | Lauren Huber | 5 ft 10 in (1.78 m) | Sr | Libertyville High School | Libertyville, IL |
| F | 35 | Lindsay Berger | 6 ft 2 in (1.88 m) | Sr | Parkland High School | Orefield, PA |
| F | 44 | Gracynn Gough | 6 ft 0 in (1.83 m) | Fr | Charlotte Catholic High School | Charlotte, NC |

Head coach

- Candice Green (Colgate)

Assistant coach(es)

- Kat Fogarty (New Hampshire)
- Paige Corkins (Concordia College)

Legend

- (C) Team captain
- (S) Suspended
- (I) Ineligible
- (W) Walk-on
- Injured
- Current redshirt

Roster
Last update: May 12, 2025

== Schedule and results ==
| Date time, TV | Rank^{#} | Opponent^{#} | Result | Record | Site (attendance) city, state |
Non-conference regular season
| November 4, 2024*; 6:00 p.m., ESPN+ | | Quinnipiac | L 74–78 | 0–1 | Hart Center (1,014); Worcester, MA |
| November 9, 2024*; 1:00 p.m., ESPN+ | | at UMass Lowell | W 61–49 | 1–1 | Costello Athletic Center (276); Lowell, MA |
| November 13, 2024*; 7:00 p.m., ESPN+ | | at Brown | W 68–53 | 2–1 | Pizzitola Sports Center (326); Providence, RI |
| November 16, 2024*; 1:00 p.m., ESPN+ | | at Vermont | L 50–67 | 2–2 | Patrick Gym (877); Burlington, VT |
| November 20, 2024*; 6:00 p.m., ESPN+/NESN | | at UMass | W 75–70 | 3–2 | Mullins Center (940); Amherst, MA |
| November 23, 2024*; 2:00 p.m., ESPN+ | | Boston College | L 55–81 | 3–3 | Hart Center (1,074); Worcester, MA |
| November 26, 2024*; 6:00 p.m., ESPN+ | | at New Hampshire | W 57–43 | 4–3 | Lundholm Gym (181); Durham, NH |
| December 3, 2024*; 7:00 p.m., SNY | | at No. 2 UConn | L 52–88 | 4–4 | Harry A. Gampel Pavilion (10,299); Storrs, CT |
| December 8, 2024*; 2:00 p.m., ESPN+ | | Stony Brook | W 73–56 | 5–4 | Hart Center (391); Worcester, MA |
| December 17, 2024*; 10:30 a.m., ESPN+ | | Marist | W 66–49 | 6–4 | Hart Center (3,077); Worcester, MA |
| December 21, 2024*; 1:00 p.m., FloHoops/NESN | | at Northeastern | W 61–37 | 7–4 | Cabot Center (189); Boston, MA |
Patriot League regular season
| January 2, 2025; 6:30 p.m., ESPN+ | | at Loyola (MD) | W 49–46 | 8–4 (1–0) | Reitz Arena (225); Baltimore, MD |
| January 5, 2025; 2:00 p.m., ESPN+ | | American | W 69–61 | 9–4 (2–0) | Hart Center (872); Worcester, MA |
| January 8, 2025; 7:00 p.m., ESPN+ | | at Navy | L 56–67 | 9–5 (2–1) | Alumni Hall (501); Annapolis, MD |
| January 11, 2025; 2:00 p.m., ESPN+ | | Lafayette | W 75–69 | 10–5 (3–1) | Hart Center (753); Worcester, MA |
| January 15, 2025; 6:00 p.m., ESPN+ | | Bucknell | W 63–37 | 11–5 (4–1) | Hart Center (601); Worcester, MA |
| January 18, 2025; 2:00 p.m., ESPN+ | | at American | W 76–44 | 12–5 (5–1) | Bender Arena (590); Washington, D.C. |
| January 22, 2025; 11:00 a.m., ESPN+ | | at Army | W 61–52 | 13–5 (6–1) | Christl Arena (478); West Point, NY |
| January 25, 2025; 2:00 p.m., ESPN+ | | Loyola (MD) | W 53–27 | 14–5 (7–1) | Hart Center (1,067); Worcester, MA |
| January 27, 2025; 4:00 p.m., CBSSN | | at Boston University; Turnpike Trophy | L 49–52 | 14–6 (7–2) | Case Gym (1,632); Boston, MA |
| February 1, 2025; 5:00 p.m., ESPN+ | | at Lehigh | L 47–60 | 14–7 (7–3) | Stabler Arena (941); Bethlehem, PA |
| February 8, 2025; 3:00 p.m., ESPN+/NESN | | Boston University; Turnpike Trophy | W 60–47 | 15–7 (8–3) | Hart Center (2,517); Worcester, MA |
| February 12, 2025; 6:00 p.m., ESPN+ | | at Colgate | L 51–73 | 15–8 (8–4) | Cotterell Court (186); Hamilton, NY |
| February 15, 2025; 2:00 p.m., ESPN+ | | Lehigh | L 59–69 ^{OT} | 15–9 (8–5) | Hart Center (1,006); Worcester, MA |
| February 19, 2025; 6:00 p.m., ESPN+/NBCSP | | at Lafayette | W 83–42 | 16–9 (9–5) | Kirby Sports Center (463); Easton, PA |
| February 22, 2025; 2:00 p.m., ESPN+ | | Navy | L 57–66 | 16–10 (9–6) | Hart Center (1,302); Worcester, MA |
| February 26, 2025; 6:00 p.m., ESPN+ | | Colgate | W 59–55 | 17–10 (10–6) | Hart Center (562); Worcester, MA |
| March 1, 2025; 2:00 p.m., ESPN+ | | at Bucknell | W 67–60 | 18–10 (11–6) | Sojka Pavilion (614); Lewisburg, PA |
| March 5, 2025; 6:00 p.m., ESPN+ | | Army | L 46–64 | 18–11 (11–7) | Hart Center (614); Worcester, MA |
Patriot League tournament
| March 10, 2025; 6:00 p.m., ESPN+ | (5) | at (4) Navy; Quarterfinals | W 66–52 | 19–11 | Alumni Hall (539); Annapolis, MD |
| March 13, 2025; 6:00 p.m., ESPN+ | (5) | at (1) Lehigh; Semifinals | L 44–65 | 19–12 | Stabler Arena (868); Bethlehem, PA |
*Non-conference game. ^{#}Rankings from AP poll. (#) Tournament seedings in parentheses. All times are in Eastern.
