= 2024–25 Boston University Terriers women's basketball team =

American college basketball season

2024–25 Boston University Terriers women's basketball
- Conference: Patriot League
- Record: 12–19 (5–13 Patriot)
- Head coach: Melissa Graves (4th season)
- Assistant coaches: Kourtni Williams; Jason Pellum
- Home arena: Case Gym

2024–25 Patriot League women's basketball standings
	Conf.				Overall
Team	W		L	PCT	W		L	PCT
Lehigh †	15	–	3	.833	27	–	7	.794
Army	14	–	4	.778	25	–	8	.758
Colgate	13	–	5	.722	23	–	10	.697
Navy	11	–	7	.611	19	–	12	.613
Holy Cross	11	–	7	.611	19	–	12	.613
Bucknell	11	–	7	.611	17	–	14	.548
Lafayette	6	–	12	.333	10	–	21	.323
Boston University	5	–	13	.278	12	–	19	.387
Loyola	3	–	15	.167	9	–	21	.300
American	1	–	17	.056	1	–	29	.033
† 2025 Patriot League tournament winner

The 2024–25 Boston University Terriers women's basketball team represented Boston University during the 2024–25 NCAA Division I women's basketball season. The Terriers, who were led by fourth-year head coach Melissa Graves, played their home games at Case Gym in Boston, Massachusetts as members of the Patriot League.

== Previous season ==
The Terriers finished the 2023–24 season 20–12, 10–8 in Patriot League play, to finish in a three-way tie for second place. They defeated Army, and Colgate, before falling to top-seeded Holy Cross in the Patriot League tournament championship game.

== Preseason ==
On October 16, 2024, the Patriot League released their preseason coaches poll. Boston University was picked to finish fifth in the Patriot League regular season.

=== Preseason rankings ===
Patriot League preseason poll
Predicted finish	Team	Votes (1st place)
1	Loyola (MD)	148 (10)
2	Colgate	120 (5)
3	Lehigh	109
4	Army	108 (1)
5	Boston University	106 (2)
6	Holy Cross	102 (2)
7	Navy	101
8	Bucknell	51
9	Lafayette	30
10	American	25

=== Preseason All-Patriot League Team ===
Preseason All-Patriot League Team
Player	Position	Year
Alex Giannaros	Guard	Senior

== Roster ==
2024–25 Boston University Terriers women's basketball team
Players
Coaches

Pos.	#	Name	Height	Year	Previous school	Hometown
G	1	Taylor Williams	5 ft 8 in (1.73 m)	Fr	Crestwood Prep	Ajax, Ontario
G	4	Natalie Jasper	5 ft 5 in (1.65 m)	Sr	Georgetown	Pittsburgh, Pennsylvania
G	5	Aoibhe Gormley	5 ft 8 in (1.73 m)	So	Thayer Academy	Quincy, Massachusetts
G	8	Aina Grane Torres	6 ft 0 in (1.83 m)	So	Bernat el Ferrer	Molins de Rei, Spain
G	10	Alex Giannaros	5 ft 5 in (1.65 m)	Sr	Tabor Academy	Brockton, Massachusetts
G	11	Brooke Baisley	5 ft 10 in (1.78 m)	Fr	Gill St. Bernard's School	Flanders, New Jersey
G	12	Bella McLaughlin	5 ft 8 in (1.73 m)	So	Providence	Hampden, Maine
G	14	Inés Monteagudo Pardo	5 ft 11 in (1.8 m)	So	Martí Sorolla II School	Valencia, Spain
G	18	Hildur Gunnsteinsdóttir	5 ft 10 in (1.78 m)	Fr	Hamar Basketball Club	Selfoss, Iceland
F	20	Anete Adler	6 ft 5 in (1.96 m)	Jr	Rhode Island	Keila, Estonia
G	21	Audrey Ericksen	6 ft 0 in (1.83 m)	So	Green Level High School	Cary, North Carolina
F	23	Channing Warren	6 ft 3 in (1.91 m)	Fr	Timber Creek High School	Orlando, Florida
F	31	Anastasiia Semenova	6 ft 2 in (1.88 m)	Jr	Spartak Saint Petersburg	Saint Petersburg, Russia
F	33	Inez Gallegos	6 ft 0 in (1.83 m)	Fr	Sacred Heart Cathedral Prep	San Francisco, California
F	42	Allison Schwertner	6 ft 3 in (1.91 m)	Fr	Mullen High School	Littleton, Colorado
F	94	Sisi Bentley	6 ft 0 in (1.83 m)	So	Northfield Mount Hermon School	Hartford, Connecticut

Head coach

- Melissa Graves (Notre Dame)

Assistant coach(es)

- Kourtni Williams (Mid-America Christian)
- Jason Pellum (Connecticut)

Legend

- (C) Team captain
- (S) Suspended
- (I) Ineligible
- (W) Walk-on
- Injured
- Current redshirt

Roster
Last update: May 13, 2025

== Schedule and results ==
Date time, TV	Rank^{#}	Opponent^{#}	Result	Record	Site (attendance) city, state
Non-conference regular season
November 4, 2024*; 4:30 pm, ESPN+		Northeastern	W 60–48	1–0	Case Gym (1,676); Boston, MA
November 7, 2024*; 7:00 pm, SNY		at No. 2 UConn	L 32–86	1–1	XL Center (13,355); Hartford, CT
November 12, 2024*; 6:00 pm, ESPN+		Emmanuel; Exhibition	W 71–38	–	Case Gym; Boston, MA
November 16, 2024*; 6:00 pm, ESPN+		at New Hampshire	L 60–69	1–2	Lundholm Gym (270); Durham, NH
November 21, 2024*; 6:00 pm, ESPN+		Maine	W 67–57	2–2	Case Gym (459); Boston, MA
November 27, 2024*; 12:00 pm, ESPN+		Georgetown	L 61–69	2–3	Case Gym (594); Boston, MA
December 1, 2024*; 1:00 pm, ESPN+		Rider	W 64–59	3–3	Case Gym (864); Boston, MA
December 5, 2024*; 6:00 pm, NEC Front Row		at Le Moyne	W 60–55	4–3	Ted Grant Court (305); DeWitt, NY
December 10, 2024*; 6:00 pm, ESPN+		Albany	L 36–72	4–4	Case Gym (720); Boston, MA
December 12, 2024*; 6:00 pm, NESN/ESPN+		at UMass Lowell	W 62–55	5–4	Costello Athletic Center (269); Lowell, MA
December 21, 2024*; 12:00 pm, ESPN+		at Harvard	L 26–86	5–5	Lavietes Pavilion (743); Cambridge, MA
December 29, 2024*; 2:00 pm, ESPN+		at Yale	W 77–56	6–5	John J. Lee Amphitheater (444); New Haven, CT
Patriot League regular season
January 2, 2025; 2:00 pm, ESPN+		Lafayette	L 55–66	6–6 (0–1)	Case Gym (261); Boston, MA
January 5, 2025; 1:00 pm, ESPN+		at Army	L 59–69	6–7 (0–2)	Christl Arena (588); West Point, NY
January 8, 2025; 11:30 am, ESPN+		at American	W 70–67	7–7 (1–2)	Bender Arena (302); Washington, D.C.
January 11, 2025; 2:00 pm, ESPN+		Colgate	L 49–61	7–8 (1–3)	Case Gym (915); Boston, MA
January 15, 2025; 6:00 pm, ESPN+		at Lehigh	L 54–80	7–9 (1–4)	Stabler Arena (563); Bethlehem, PA
January 18, 2025; 2:00 pm, ESPN+		Army	L 52–59	7–10 (1–5)	Case Gym (473); Boston, MA
January 22, 2025; 11:30 am, NESN/ESPN+		Navy	L 64–74	7–11 (1–6)	Case Gym (766); Boston, MA
January 25, 2025; 2:00 pm, ESPN+		at Bucknell	L 59–74	7–12 (1–7)	Sojka Pavilion (268); Lewisburg, PA
January 27, 2025; 4:00 pm, CBSSN		Holy Cross; Turnpike Trophy	W 52–49	8–12 (2–7)	Case Gym (1,632); Boston, MA
February 1, 2025; 5:00 pm, ESPN+		Loyola (MD)	L 68–72	8–13 (2–8)	Case Gym (627); Boston, MA
February 8, 2025; 3:00 pm, NESN/ESPN+		at Holy Cross; Turnpike Trophy	L 47–60	8–14 (2–9)	Hart Center (2,517); Worcester, MA
February 12, 2025; 6:00 pm, ESPN+		Bucknell	L 63–67	8–15 (2–10)	Case Gym (393); Boston, MA
February 15, 2025; 2:00 pm, ESPN+		at Colgate	L 51–71	8–16 (2–11)	Cotterell Court (308); Hamilton, NY
February 19, 2025; 7:00 pm, ESPN+		at Loyola (MD)	W 55–38	9–16 (3–11)	Reitz Arena (240); Baltimore, MD
February 22, 2025; 2:00 pm, ESPN+		American	W 82–72	10–16 (4–11)	Case Gym (590); Boston, MA
February 26, 2025; 6:00 pm, ESPN+		Lehigh	W 80–68	11–16 (5–11)	Case Gym (720); Boston, MA
March 1, 2025; 2:00 pm, ESPN+		at Lafayette	L 58–63	11–17 (5–12)	Kirby Sports Center (326); Easton, PA
March 5, 2025; 5:30 pm, ESPN+		at Navy	L 47–60	11–18 (5–13)	Alumni Hall (502); Annapolis, MD
Patriot League tournament
March 8, 2025; 2:00 pm, ESPN+	(8)	(9) Loyola (MD); First Round	W 75–51	12–18	Case Gym (230); Boston, MA
March 10, 2025; 6:00 pm, ESPN+	(8)	at (1) Lehigh; Quarterfinals	L 44–62	12–19	Stabler Arena (826); Bethlehem, PA
*Non-conference game. ^{#}Rankings from AP Poll. (#) Tournament seedings in parentheses. All times are in Eastern.
