= 2024–25 Loyola Greyhounds women's basketball team =

American college basketball season

2024–25 Loyola Greyhounds women's basketball
- Conference: Patriot League
- Record: 9–21 (3–15 Patriot)
- Head coach: Danielle O'Banion (4th season)
- Assistant coaches: Diana Martinez; Annalese Lamke
- Home arena: Reitz Arena

2024–25 Patriot League women's basketball standings
	Conf.				Overall
Team	W		L	PCT	W		L	PCT
Lehigh †	15	–	3	.833	27	–	7	.794
Army	14	–	4	.778	25	–	8	.758
Colgate	13	–	5	.722	23	–	10	.697
Navy	11	–	7	.611	19	–	12	.613
Holy Cross	11	–	7	.611	19	–	12	.613
Bucknell	11	–	7	.611	17	–	14	.548
Lafayette	6	–	12	.333	10	–	21	.323
Boston University	5	–	13	.278	12	–	19	.387
Loyola	3	–	15	.167	9	–	21	.300
American	1	–	17	.056	1	–	29	.033
† 2025 Patriot League tournament winner

The 2024–25 Loyola Greyhounds women's basketball team represented Loyola University Maryland during the 2024–25 NCAA Division I women's basketball season. The Greyhounds, who were led by fourth-year head coach Danielle O'Banion, played their home games at Reitz Arena in Baltimore, Maryland as members of the Patriot League.

== Previous season ==
The Greyhounds finished the 2023–24 season 16–15, 10–8 in Patriot League play, to finish in a three-way tie for second place. They defeated Lehigh, before falling to top-seeded and eventual tournament champions Holy Cross in the semifinals of the Patriot League tournament.

== Preseason ==
On October 16, 2024, the Patriot League released their preseason coaches poll. Loyola was picked to finish first in the Patriot League regular season.

=== Preseason rankings ===
Patriot League preseason poll
Predicted finish	Team	Votes (1st place)
1	Loyola (MD)	148 (10)
2	Colgate	120 (5)
3	Lehigh	109
4	Army	108 (1)
5	Boston University	106 (2)
6	Holy Cross	102 (2)
7	Navy	101
8	Bucknell	51
9	Lafayette	30
10	American	25

=== Patriot League Preseason Player of the Year ===
Patriot League Preseason Player of the Year
Player	Position	Year
Lex Therien	Forward	Senior

=== Preseason All-Patriot League Team ===
Preseason All-Patriot League Team
Player	Position	Year
Lex Therien	Forward	Senior

== Roster ==
2024–25 Loyola Greyhounds women's basketball team
Players
Coaches

Pos.	#	Name	Height	Year	Previous school	Hometown
G	1	Kelly Ratigan	5 ft 8 in (1.73 m)	Jr	St. Joseph High School	South Bend, Indiana
G	2	Meliah Van-Otoo	5 ft 4 in (1.63 m)	Jr	Westtown School	Drexel Hill, Pennsylvania
C	4	Aminata Hernandez	6 ft 0 in (1.83 m)	So	Sant Gabriel	Gran Canaria, Spain
G	5	Kimmie Hicks	5 ft 9 in (1.75 m)	So	Saint Frances Academy	Annapolis, Maryland
F	10	Koi Sims	6 ft 0 in (1.83 m)	Sr	Albany	Glen Burnie, Maryland
F	11	Lex Therien	6 ft 1 in (1.85 m)	Sr	Cherokee High School	Marlton, New Jersey
G	12	Cristina Garcia	5 ft 9 in (1.75 m)	Jr	Pisgah High School	Barcelona, Spain
G	15	Laura Salmerón	5 ft 8 in (1.73 m)	Sr	Institut Llavaneres	Barcelona, Spain
G	20	Kailey Kalet	5 ft 8 in (1.73 m)	So	Union Springs High School	Union Springs, New York
F	23	Marta Espinal	5 ft 11 in (1.8 m)	Jr	Les d'Auro School	Barcelona, Spain
F	24	Ally Lovisolo	6 ft 1 in (1.85 m)	Jr	Blair Academy	Allendale, New Jersey
G	25	Avery Simmons	5 ft 11 in (1.8 m)	Fr	Park Hill South High School	Parkville, Missouri
G	33	Gabby Betton	5 ft 9 in (1.75 m)	Fr	Lakeville North High School	Lakeville, Minnesota
G	34	Amandine Amorich	5 ft 11 in (1.8 m)	So	Cégep de Sainte-Foy	Montpellier, France
C	55	Lily Bottomley	6 ft 2 in (1.88 m)	So	Northwest High School	Canal Fulton, Ohio

Head coach

- Danielle O'Banion (Boston College)

Assistant coach(es)

- Diana Martinez (St. Andrews)
- Annalese Lamke (Minnesota)

Legend

- (C) Team captain
- (S) Suspended
- (I) Ineligible
- (W) Walk-on
- Injured
- Current redshirt

Roster
Last update: May 15, 2025

== Schedule and results ==
Date time, TV	Rank^{#}	Opponent^{#}	Result	Record	Site (attendance) city, state
Non-conference regular season
November 7, 2024*; 7:00 pm, ESPN+		at James Madison	L 54–85	0–1	Atlantic Union Bank Center (2,273); Harrisonburg, VA
November 10, 2024*; 5:00 pm, ESPN+		UMBC	W 54–46	1–1	Reitz Arena (658); Baltimore, MD
November 13, 2024*; 7:00 pm, ESPN+		St. John's	L 61–69	1–2	Reitz Arena (353); Baltimore, MD
November 17, 2024*; 2:00 pm, NEC Front Row		at Saint Francis	W 65–52	2–2	DeGol Arena (420); Loretto, PA
November 23, 2024*; 2:00 pm, ESPN+		UNC Asheville	W 67–51	3–2	Reitz Arena (7,344); Baltimore, MD
November 27, 2024*; 12:00 pm, ESPN+		at St. Bonaventure	W 60–42	4–2	Reilly Center (352); St. Bonaventure, NY
November 30, 2024*; 2:00 pm, ESPN+		at Binghamton	L 46–62	4–3	Dr. Bai Lee Court (1,060); Vestal, NY
December 4, 2024*; 11:00 am, ESPN+		Radford	W 70–64 ^{OT}	5–3	Reitz Arena (1,107); Baltimore, MD
December 7, 2024*; 2:00 pm, ESPN+		at Mount St. Mary's	L 48–65	5–4	Knott Arena (355); Emmitsburg, MD
December 22, 2024*; 12:00 pm, ACCNX		at No. 3 Notre Dame	L 54–97	5–5	Purcell Pavilion (7,746); Notre Dame, IN
December 30, 2024*; 2:00 pm, ESPN+		Haverford	W 82–38	6–5	Reitz Arena (215); Baltimore, MD
Patriot League regular season
January 2, 2025; 6:30 pm, ESPN+		Holy Cross	L 46–49	6–6 (0–1)	Reitz Arena (225); Baltimore, MD
January 5, 2025; 2:00 pm, ESPN+		at Lehigh	L 66–74	6–7 (0–2)	Stabler Arena (493); Bethlehem, PA
January 8, 2025; 7:00 pm, ESPN+		Army	L 55–70	6–8 (0–3)	Reitz Arena (145); Baltimore, MD
January 11, 2025; 1:00 pm, ESPN+		at Navy	L 59–63	6–9 (0–4)	Alumni Hall (1,027); Annapolis, MD
January 13, 2025; 4:00 pm, CBSSN		American	W 77–38	7–9 (1–4)	Reitz Arena (500); Baltimore, MD
January 18, 2025; 5:00 pm, ESPN+		Lehigh	L 43–54	7–10 (1–5)	Reitz Arena (245); Baltimore, MD
January 22, 2025; 6:00 pm, ESPN+		at Lafayette	L 59–60	7–11 (1–6)	Kirby Sports Center (186); Easton, PA
January 25, 2025; 2:00 pm, ESPN+		at Holy Cross	L 27–53	7–12 (1–7)	Hart Center (1,067); Worcester, MA
January 29, 2025; 7:00 pm, ESPN+		Bucknell	L 49–54	7–13 (1–8)	Reitz Arena (230); Baltimore, MD
February 1, 2025; 5:00 pm, ESPN+		at Boston University	W 72–68	8–13 (2–8)	Case Gym (627); Boston, MA
February 9, 2025; 2:00 pm, ESPN+		Colgate	L 59–74	8–14 (2–9)	Reitz Arena (930); Baltimore, MD
February 12, 2025; 6:00 pm, ESPN+		at Army	L 53–64	8–15 (2–10)	Christl Arena (453); West Point, NY
February 15, 2025; 12:30 pm, ESPN+		at American	W 68–39	9–15 (3–10)	Bender Arena (518); Washington, D.C.
February 19, 2025; 7:00 pm, ESPN+		Boston University	L 38–55	9–16 (3–11)	Reitz Arena (240); Baltimore, MD
February 22, 2025; 2:00 pm, ESPN+		at Colgate	L 57–68	9–17 (3–12)	Cotterell Court (423); Hamilton, NY
February 26, 2025; 6:00 pm, ESPN+		at Bucknell	L 45–79	9–18 (3–13)	Sojka Pavilion (266); Lewisburg, PA
March 1, 2025; 12:00 pm, ESPN+		Navy	L 53–66	9–19 (3–14)	Reitz Arena (465); Baltimore, MD
March 5, 2025; 7:00 pm, ESPN+		Lafayette	L 54–57	9–20 (3–15)	Reitz Arena (241); Baltimore, MD
Patriot League tournament
March 8, 2025; 2:00 pm, ESPN+	(9)	at (8) Boston University; First Round	L 51–75	9–21	Case Gym (230); Boston, MA
*Non-conference game. ^{#}Rankings from AP Poll. (#) Tournament seedings in parentheses. All times are in Eastern.
