= 2024–25 Navy Midshipmen women's basketball team =

American college basketball season

2024–25 Navy Midshipmen women's basketball

WNIT, First Round
- Conference: Patriot League
- Record: 19–12 (11–7 Patriot)
- Head coach: Tim Taylor (5th season)
- Associate head coach: Michael Coppolino
- Assistant coaches: Marlena Tremba; Bernadette Devaney; Faith Randolph
- Home arena: Alumni Hall

2024–25 Patriot League women's basketball standings
	Conf.				Overall
Team	W		L	PCT	W		L	PCT
Lehigh †	15	–	3	.833	27	–	7	.794
Army	14	–	4	.778	25	–	8	.758
Colgate	13	–	5	.722	23	–	10	.697
Navy	11	–	7	.611	19	–	12	.613
Holy Cross	11	–	7	.611	19	–	12	.613
Bucknell	11	–	7	.611	17	–	14	.548
Lafayette	6	–	12	.333	10	–	21	.323
Boston University	5	–	13	.278	12	–	19	.387
Loyola	3	–	15	.167	9	–	21	.300
American	1	–	17	.056	1	–	29	.033
† 2025 Patriot League tournament winner

The 2024–25 Navy Midshipmen women's basketball team represented the United States Naval Academy during the 2024–25 NCAA Division I women's basketball season. The Midshipmen, who were led by fifth-year head coach Tim Taylor, played their home games at Alumni Hall in Annapolis, Maryland, as members of the Patriot League.

== Previous season ==
The Midshipmen finished the 2023–24 season 14–17, 9–9 in Patriot League play, to finish in a four-way tie for fifth place. They would defeat Lafayette, before falling to Colgate in the quarterfinals of the Patriot League tournament.

== Preseason ==
On October 16, 2024, the Patriot League released their preseason coaches poll. Navy was picked to finish seventh in the Patriot League regular season.

=== Preseason rankings ===
Patriot League preseason poll
Predicted finish	Team	Votes (1st place)
1	Loyola (MD)	148 (10)
2	Colgate	120 (5)
3	Lehigh	109
4	Army	108 (1)
5	Boston University	106 (2)
6	Holy Cross	102 (2)
7	Navy	101
8	Bucknell	51
9	Lafayette	30
10	American	25

=== Preseason All-Patriot League Team ===
Preseason All-Patriot League Team
Player	Position	Year
Zanai Barnett-Gay	Guard	Sophomore

== Roster ==
2024–25 Navy Midshipmen women's basketball team
Players
Coaches

Pos.	#	Name	Height	Year	Previous school	Hometown
G	1	Kelli Giuliani	5 ft 7 in (1.7 m)	Jr	Flint Hill School	Oakton, Virginia
G	2	Kyah Smith	5 ft 9 in (1.75 m)	So	L. C. Bird High School	Richmond, Virginia
G	4	Zanai Barnett-Gay	5 ft 8 in (1.73 m)	So	Riverdale Baptist School	Glenn Dale, Maryland
G	5	Mary Gibbons	5 ft 7 in (1.7 m)	Fr	Wachusett Regional High School	Holden, Massachusetts
G	6	Julianna Almeida	5 ft 9 in (1.75 m)	Fr	Saddle River Day School	North Arlington, New Jersey
F	10	Lizzie Holder	6 ft 1 in (1.85 m)	So	Colorado	Stillwater, Minnesota
G	12	Morgan Blackford	5 ft 6 in (1.68 m)	So	Solon High School	Solon, Ohio
F	13	Gia Pissott	6 ft 3 in (1.91 m)	Jr	Toms River High School North	Toms River, New Jersey
G	22	Toni Papahronis	6 ft 1 in (1.85 m)	Jr	Edmond North High School	Edmond, Oklahoma
F	23	Morgan Demos	6 ft 2 in (1.88 m)	Jr	Benet Academy	Downers Grove, Illinois
G	25	Nia Henley	5 ft 5 in (1.65 m)	Fr	Riverbend High School	Spotsylvania, Virginia
G	30	Maren Louridas	6 ft 0 in (1.83 m)	Jr	Bethlehem Central High School	Delmar, New York
G	42	Saran Moschella	5 ft 10 in (1.78 m)	So	Staten Island Academy	Staten Island, New York
C	44	Kate Samson	6 ft 4 in (1.93 m)	Jr	Saint Gertrude High School	Richmond, Virginia

Head coach

- Tim Taylor (James Madison)

Assistant coach(es)

- Michael Coppolino (Eckerd)
- Marlena Tremba (William & Mary)
- Bernadette Devaney (Lehigh)
- Faith Randolph (Virginia)

Legend

- (C) Team captain
- (S) Suspended
- (I) Ineligible
- (W) Walk-on
- Injured
- Current redshirt

Roster
Last update: May 11, 2025

== Schedule and results ==
Date time, TV	Rank^{#}	Opponent^{#}	Result	Record	Site (attendance) city, state
Non-conference regular season
November 4, 2024*; 6:00 pm, ESPN+		at Rider	W 74–52	1–0	Alumni Gymnasium (589); Lawrenceville, NJ
November 6, 2024*; 7:00 pm, ESPN+		Bryn Athyn	W 103–45	2–0	Alumni Hall (325); Annapolis, MD
November 12, 2024*; 11:00 am, ESPN+		at Iona	W 55–53	3–0	Hynes Athletics Center (2,171); New Rochelle, NY
November 14, 2024*; 7:00 pm, ESPN+		Wagner	W 79–46	4–0	Alumni Hall (302); Annapolis, MD
November 17, 2024*; 12:00 pm, Pass Tha Ball		vs. Radford	W 78–73 ^{OT}	5–0	Colonial Hall (286); White Sulphur Springs, WV
November 23, 2024*; 1:00 pm, ESPN+		at Longwood	W 75–61	6–0	Joan Perry Brock Center (1,092); Farmville, VA
November 30, 2024*; 1:00 pm, ESPN+		Toledo; Navy Classic	L 51–58	6–1	Alumni Hall; Annapolis, MD
December 1, 2024*; 1:00 pm, ESPN+		George Mason; Navy Classic	L 63–85	6–2	Alumni Hall; Annapolis, MD
December 4, 2024*; 7:00 pm, ESPN+		Dartmouth	L 58–61 ^{OT}	6–3	Alumni Hall (544); Annapolis, MD
December 7, 2024*; 12:00 pm, ESPN+		Stetson	W 66–49	7–3	Alumni Hall (365); Annapolis, MD
December 19, 2024*; 6:00 pm, ESPN+		Delaware	W 79–69	8–3	Alumni Hall (462); Annapolis, MD
Patriot League regular season
January 2, 2025; 7:00 pm, ESPN+		at American	W 66–59	9–3 (1–0)	Bender Arena (355); Washington, D.C.
January 5, 2025; 2:00 pm, ESPN+		at Lafayette	W 71–49	10–3 (2–0)	Kirby Sports Center (274); Easton, PA
January 8, 2025; 7:00 pm, ESPN+		Holy Cross	W 67–56	11–3 (3–0)	Alumni Hall (501); Annapolis, MD
January 11, 2025; 1:00 pm, ESPN+		Loyola (MD)	W 63–59	12–3 (4–0)	Alumni Hall (1,027); Annapolis, MD
January 15, 2025; 11:00 am, ESPN+		at Colgate	L 54–62	12–4 (4–1)	Cotterell Court (1,604); Hamilton, NY
January 18, 2025; 1:00 pm, ESPN+		Bucknell	W 49–47	13–4 (5–1)	Alumni Hall (678); Annapolis, MD
January 22, 2025; 11:30 am, ESPN+		at Boston University	W 74–64	14–4 (6–1)	Case Gym (766); Boston, MA
January 26, 2025; 1:00 pm, CBSSN		at Army	L 49–59	14–5 (6–2)	Christl Arena (4,643); West Point, NY
January 29, 2025; 7:00 pm, ESPN+		Lehigh	L 66–87	14–6 (6–3)	Alumni Hall (557); Annapolis, MD
February 1, 2025; 4:00 pm, ESPN+		at Bucknell	W 79–75 ^{OT}	15–6 (7–3)	Sojka Pavilion (421); Lewisburg, PA
February 8, 2025; 4:00 pm, ESPN+		Lafayette	L 60–61	15–7 (7–4)	Alumni Hall (1,033); Annapolis, MD
February 12, 2025; 6:00 pm, ESPN+		at Lehigh	L 56–74	15–8 (7–5)	Stabler Arena (623); Bethlehem, PA
February 15, 2025; 11:00 am, CBSSN		Army	L 64–68	15–9 (7–6)	Alumni Hall (5,298); Annapolis, MD
February 19, 2025; 7:00 pm, ESPN+		Colgate	L 72–76 ^{OT}	15–10 (7–7)	Alumni Hall (408); Annapolis, MD
February 22, 2025; 2:00 pm, ESPN+		at Holy Cross	W 66–57	16–10 (8–7)	Hart Center (1,302); Worcester, MA
February 26, 2025; 7:00 pm, ESPN+		American	W 88–60	17–10 (9–7)	Alumni Hall (668); Annapolis, MD
March 1, 2025; 12:00 pm, ESPN+		at Loyola (MD)	W 66–53	18–10 (10–7)	Reitz Arena (465); Baltimore, MD
March 5, 2025; 5:30 pm, ESPN+		Boston University	W 60–47	19–10 (11–7)	Alumni Hall (502); Annapolis, MD
Patriot League tournament
March 10, 2025; 6:00 pm, ESPN+	(4)	(5) Holy Cross; Quarterfinals	L 52–66	19–11	Alumni Hall (539); Annapolis, MD
WNIT
March 22, 2025*; 2:00 pm, ESPN+		at Old Dominion; First Round	L 42–63	19–12	Chartway Arena (871); Norfolk, VA
*Non-conference game. ^{#}Rankings from AP Poll. (#) Tournament seedings in parentheses. All times are in Eastern.
