= 2024–25 Army Black Knights women's basketball team =

American college basketball season

2024–25 Army Black Knights women's basketball

WNIT, Second Round
- Conference: Patriot League
- Record: 25–8 (14–4 Patriot)
- Head coach: Missy Traversi (4th season)
- Associate head coach: Tony DiClemente
- Assistant coaches: Claire Gritt; Glenn Rigney; Brie Wajer; Brittany Aikens
- Home arena: Christl Arena

2024–25 Patriot League women's basketball standings
	Conf.				Overall
Team	W		L	PCT	W		L	PCT
Lehigh †	15	–	3	.833	27	–	7	.794
Army	14	–	4	.778	25	–	8	.758
Colgate	13	–	5	.722	23	–	10	.697
Navy	11	–	7	.611	19	–	12	.613
Holy Cross	11	–	7	.611	19	–	12	.613
Bucknell	11	–	7	.611	17	–	14	.548
Lafayette	6	–	12	.333	10	–	21	.323
Boston University	5	–	13	.278	12	–	19	.387
Loyola	3	–	15	.167	9	–	21	.300
American	1	–	17	.056	1	–	29	.033
† 2025 Patriot League tournament winner

The 2024–25 Army Black Knights women's basketball team represented the United States Military Academy during the 2024–25 NCAA Division I women's basketball season. The Black Knights, who were led by fourth-year head coach Missy Traversi, played their home games at Christl Arena in West Point, New York as members of the Patriot League.

== Previous season ==
The Black Knights finished the 2023–24 season 12–17, 9–9 in Patriot League play, to finish in a four-way tie for fifth place. They were defeated by Boston University in the quarterfinals of the Patriot League tournament.

== Preseason ==
On October 16, 2024, the Patriot League released their preseason coaches poll. Army was picked to finish fourth in the Patriot League regular season.

=== Preseason rankings ===
Patriot League preseason poll
Predicted finish	Team	Votes (1st place)
1	Loyola (MD)	148 (10)
2	Colgate	120 (5)
3	Lehigh	109
4	Army	108 (1)
5	Boston University	106 (2)
6	Holy Cross	102 (2)
7	Navy	101
8	Bucknell	51
9	Lafayette	30
10	American	25

=== Preseason All-Patriot League Team ===
No Black Knights were named to the Preseason All-Patriot League Team.

== Roster ==
2024–25 Army Black Knights women's basketball team
Players
Coaches

Pos.	#	Name	Height	Year	Previous school	Hometown
G	1	Anna Eng	5 ft 5 in (1.65 m)	So	Fairfield	Croton-on-Hudson, New York
G	2	Audrey Annee	5 ft 9 in (1.75 m)	Fr	Center Grove High School	Indianapolis, Indiana
G	3	Brooke Wilson	5 ft 9 in (1.75 m)	Fr	Archbishop John Carroll High School	Bryn Mawr, Pennsylvania
G	4	Stella Chartrand	5 ft 9 in (1.75 m)	Fr	The Westminster Schools	Atlanta, Georgia
G	11	Carlee Casteel	5 ft 7 in (1.7 m)	So	Rogers Heritage High School	Rogers, Arkansas
G	12	Hannah Laub	6 ft 0 in (1.83 m)	Fr	Waubonsie Valley High School	Naperville, Illinois
G	13	Trinity Hardy	5 ft 8 in (1.73 m)	Sr	Winter Haven High School	Lakeland, Florida
G	20	Camryn Tade	5 ft 9 in (1.75 m)	So	Carroll High School	Southlake, Texas
G	21	Reese Ericson	5 ft 6 in (1.68 m)	Jr	Lakeridge High School	Lake Oswego, Oregon
G/F	22	Taylor Wilson	5 ft 10 in (1.78 m)	So	Archbishop John Carroll High School	Bryn Mawr, Pennsylvania
F	23	Sam Tillson	6 ft 1 in (1.85 m)	Fr	McKinney High School	McKinney, Texas
F	30	Kya Smith	6 ft 1 in (1.85 m)	So	Coronado High School	Lubbock, Texas
G/F	33	Fiona Hastick	5 ft 11 in (1.8 m)	So	Paul VI Catholic High School (USMAPS)	Reston, Virginia
G/F	35	Soleil Montrose	5 ft 10 in (1.78 m)	So	UTEP	Irvine, California
F	44	Sophia McCartney	6 ft 2 in (1.88 m)	Fr	St. John Neumann High School	Naples, Florida

Head coach

- Missy Traversi (Maine)

Assistant coach(es)

- Tony DiClemente (Stony Brook)
- Claire Gritt (Denver)
- Glenn Rigney (Miami (FL))
- Brie Wajer (Villanova)
- Brittany Aikens (Fresno State)

Legend

- (C) Team captain
- (S) Suspended
- (I) Ineligible
- (W) Walk-on
- Injured
- Current redshirt

Roster
Last update: May 6, 2025

== Schedule and results ==
Date time, TV	Rank^{#}	Opponent^{#}	Result	Record	Site (attendance) city, state
Non-conference regular season
November 4, 2024*; 5:00 pm, ESPN+		Cornell	L 54–60	0–1	Christl Arena (250); West Point, NY
November 6, 2024*; 6:00 pm, ESPN+		at Siena	W 66–56	1–1	UHY Center (864); Loudonville, NY
November 9, 2024*; 1:00 pm, ESPN+		Saint Peter's	W 64–42	2–1	Christl Arena (588); West Point, NY
November 12, 2024*; 6:00 pm, ESPN+		Oakland	W 58–54	3–1	Christl Arena (462); West Point, NY
November 15, 2024*; 6:00 pm, ESPN+		Air Force	W 57–51 ^{OT}	4–1	Christl Arena (948); West Point, NY
November 20, 2024*; 6:00 pm, ESPN+		at NJIT	W 69–68 ^{OT}	5–1	Wellness and Events Center (345); Newark, NJ
November 23, 2024*; 1:00 pm, ESPN+		at UMass	W 56–50	6–1	Mullins Center (959); Amherst, MA
December 3, 2024*; 12:00 pm, NEC Front Row		at Mercyhurst	Canceled		Owen McCormick Court; Erie, PA
December 7, 2024*; 1:00 pm, ESPN+		at New Hampshire	W 60–59	7–1	Lundholm Gym (339); Durham, NH
December 13, 2024*; 2:00 pm, ESPN+		at Howard	L 54–61	7–2	Burr Gymnasium (498); Washington, D.C.
December 29, 2024*; 12:00 pm, ESPN+		Mount Saint Mary	W 85–36	8–2	Christl Arena (1,102); West Point, NY
Patriot League regular season
January 2, 2025; 6:00 pm, ESPN+		Colgate	W 56–38	9–2 (1–0)	Christl Arena (569); West Point, NY
January 5, 2025; 1:00 pm, ESPN+		Boston University	W 69–59	10–2 (2–0)	Christl Arena (588); West Point, NY
January 8, 2025; 7:00 pm, ESPN+		at Loyola (MD)	W 70–55	11–2 (3–0)	Reitz Arena (145); Baltimore, MD
January 12, 2025; 1:00 pm, ESPN+		Lehigh	L 51–90	11–3 (3–1)	Christl Arena (450); West Point, NY
January 15, 2025; 11:00 am, ESPN+		at Lafayette	W 74–65	12–3 (4–1)	Kirby Sports Center (1,829); Easton, PA
January 18, 2025; 2:00 pm, ESPN+		at Boston University	W 59–52	13–3 (5–1)	Case Gym (473); Boston, MA
January 22, 2025; 11:00 am, ESPN+		Holy Cross	L 52–61	13–4 (5–2)	Christl Arena (478); West Point, NY
January 26, 2025; 1:00 pm, CBSSN		Navy	W 59–49	14–4 (6–2)	Christl Arena (4,643); West Point, NY
January 29, 2025; 6:00 pm, ESPN+		at Colgate	W 65–60	15–4 (7–2)	Cotterell Court (197); Hamilton, NY
February 1, 2025; 6:00 pm, ESPN+		American	W 84–60	16–4 (8–2)	Christl Arena (558); West Point, NY
February 8, 2025; 12:00 pm, ESPN+		at Bucknell	L 65–75	16–5 (8–3)	Sojka Pavilion (439); Lewisburg, PA
February 12, 2025; 6:00 pm, ESPN+		Loyola (MD)	W 64–53	17–5 (9–3)	Christl Arena (453); West Point, NY
February 15, 2025; 11:00 am, CBSSN		at Navy	W 68–64	18–5 (10–3)	Alumni Hall (5,298); Annapolis, MD
February 19, 2025; 7:00 pm, ESPN+		at American	W 63–43	19–5 (11–3)	Bender Arena (394); Washington, D.C.
February 22, 2025; 12:00 pm, ESPN+		Bucknell	W 69–54	20–5 (12–3)	Christl Arena (673); West Point, NY
February 26, 2025; 3:00 pm, ESPN+		Lafayette	W 75–48	21–5 (13–3)	Christl Arena (472); West Point, NY
March 1, 2025; 2:00 pm, ESPN+		at Lehigh	L 61–76	21–6 (13–4)	Stabler Arena (866); Bethlehem, PA
March 5, 2025; 6:00 pm, ESPN+		at Holy Cross	W 64–46	22–6 (14–4)	Hart Center (614); Worcester, MA
Patriot League tournament
March 10, 2025; 6:00 pm, ESPN+	(2)	(7) Lafayette; Quarterfinals	W 55–40	23–6	Christl Arena; West Point, NY
March 13, 2025; 6:00 pm, ESPN+	(2)	(6) Bucknell; Semifinals	W 49–39	24–6	Christl Arena (888); West Point, NY
March 16, 2025; 12:00 pm, CBSSN	(2)	at (1) Lehigh; Championship	L 62–74	24–7	Stabler Arena (1,515); Bethlehem, PA
WNIT
March 20, 2025*; 5:00 pm, ESPN+		at Bryant; First Round	W 59–58	25–7	Chace Athletic Center; Smithfield, RI
March 23, 2025*; 2:00 pm, B1G+		at Rutgers; Second Round	L 60–71	25–8	Jersey Mike's Arena (703); Piscataway, NJ
*Non-conference game. ^{#}Rankings from AP Poll. (#) Tournament seedings in parentheses. All times are in Eastern.
