= 2020–21 Boston University Terriers women's basketball team =

Intercollegiate basketball season

2020–21 Boston University Terriers women's basketball
- Conference: Patriot League
- Record: 12–3 (10–2 Patriot)
- Head coach: Marisa Moseley (3rd season)
- Assistant coach: Kate Barnosky
- Home arena: Case Gym

2020–21 Patriot League women's basketball standings
	Conf.				Overall
Team	W		L	PCT	W		L	PCT
North
Boston University	11	–	2	.846	12	–	3	.800
Holy Cross	7	–	7	.500	7	–	8	.467
Army	6	–	8	.429	9	–	11	.450
Colgate	1	–	8	.111	1	–	8	.111
Central
Bucknell	8	–	1	.889	9	–	1	.900
Lehigh†	8	–	5	.615	10	–	6	.625
Lafayette	5	–	7	.417	5	–	8	.385
South
American	7	–	4	.636	8	–	4	.667
Navy	5	–	4	.556	5	–	8	.385
Loyola (MD)	0	–	12	.000	0	–	13	.000
† 2021 Patriot League tournament winner Colgate suspended their season on February 18, 2021; As of July 7, 2024; Rankings from AP poll

The 2020–21 Boston University Terriers women's basketball team represented Boston University during the 2020–21 NCAA Division I women's basketball season. The Terriers were led by third-year head coach Marisa Moseley and played their home games at Case Gym as members of the Patriot League.

== Previous season ==
They finished the previous season 18–12, 12–6 in Patriot League play, to finish in second place. They beat American in the quarterfinals of the Patriot League tournament. The tournament was cancelled after the quarterfinals due to the COVID-19 pandemic. The NCAA tournament and NIT were also cancelled due to the pandemic.

== Roster ==
2020–21 Boston University Terriers women's basketball team
Players
Coaches

Pos.	#	Name	Height	Year	Previous school	Hometown
G	2	Katie Nelson	5 ft 8 in (1.73 m)	Sr	Bishop Feehan HS	Falmouth, MA
G	3	Kelsi Mingo	5 ft 8 in (1.73 m)	GS	Boca Raton HS	Boca Raton, FL
G	4	Liz Shean	5 ft 8 in (1.73 m)	So	Yorktown HS	Arlington, VA
F	5	Chiara Tibbitt	6 ft 1 in (1.85 m)	Jr	Rutgers Prep	Somerset, NJ
F	10	Ashley Sieper	6 ft 2 in (1.88 m)	Jr	Tampa Catholic HS	Tampa, FL
F	12	Annabelle Larnard	6 ft 0 in (1.83 m)	So	Northfield Mount Hermon	Scituate, MA
G	14	Sydney Johnson	5 ft 9 in (1.75 m)	So	The Lovett School	Powder Springs, GA
G	21	Emily Esposito	5 ft 9 in (1.75 m)	RS Jr	Gorham HS	Gorham, ME
G	22	Maggie Pina	5 ft 7 in (1.7 m)	So	Academy of Notre Dame de Namur	West Chester, PA
G	23	Tenisha Pressley	5 ft 9 in (1.75 m)	Sr	Gloucester Catholic HS	Deptford, NJ
F	25	Riley Childs	6 ft 0 in (1.83 m)	Jr	Medway HS	Medway, MA
F	33	Maren Durant	6 ft 3 in (1.91 m)	So	The Rivers School	Winchester, MA
G	40	Sophie Beneventine	5 ft 8 in (1.73 m)	Fr	Ridge HS	Basking Ridge, NJ
F	55	Mackenzie Miers	6 ft 2 in (1.88 m)	Sr	Easton Area HS	Easton, PA

Head coach

- Marisa Moseley (Boston University)

Assistant coach(es)

- Kate Barnosky (Tufts)

Legend

- (C) Team captain
- (S) Suspended
- (I) Ineligible
- (W) Walk-on
- Injured
- Current redshirt

Roster
Last update: July 17, 2024

== Schedule ==
Date time, TV	Rank^{#}	Opponent^{#}	Result	Record	High points	High rebounds	High assists	Site (attendance) city, state
Non-conference regular season
Patriot League regular season
January 4, 2021		Holy Cross						Case Gym; Boston, MA
January 5, 2021		at Holy Cross						Hart Center; Worcester, MA
January 9, 2021		at Colgate						Cotterell Court; Hamilton, NY
January 10, 2021		at Colgate						Cotterell Court; Hamilton, NY
January 16, 2021		at Army						Christl Arena; West Point, NY
January 17, 2021		at Army						Christl Arena; West Point, NY
January 23, 2021		Lafayette						Case Gym; Boston, MA
January 24, 2021		Lafayette						Case Gym; Boston, MA
January 30, 2021		Holy Cross						Case Gym; Boston, MA
January 31, 2021		Holy Cross						Hart Center; Worcester, MA
February 6, 2021		Colgate						Case Gym; Boston, MA
February 7, 2021		Colgate						Case Gym; Boston, MA
February 13, 2021		Army						Case Gym; Boston, MA
February 14, 2021		Army						Case Gym; Boston, MA
February 20, 2021		at Holy Cross						Hart Center; Worcester, MA
February 21, 2021		Holy Cross						Case Gym; Boston, MA
Patriot League tournament
		vs.						
*Non-conference game. ^{#}Rankings from AP poll. (#) Tournament seedings in parentheses. All times are in Eastern.

== See also ==
- 2020–21 Boston University Terriers men's basketball team
