= 2021–22 Army Black Knights women's basketball team =

Intercollegiate basketball season

2021–22 Army Black Knights women's basketball
- Conference: Patriot League
- Record: 15–10 (9–6 Patriot)
- Head coach: Missy Traversi (1st season)
- Assistant coaches: Anthony Angotti; Cristina Centeno; Tony DiClemente; Jenerrie Harris; Gadson Lefft
- Home arena: Christl Arena

2021–22 Patriot League women's basketball standings
	Conf.				Overall
Team	W		L	PCT	W		L	PCT
Holy Cross	14	–	4	.778	20	–	11	.645
American †	13	–	5	.722	23	–	9	.719
Boston University	12	–	6	.667	17	–	14	.548
Bucknell	12	–	6	.667	24	–	10	.706
Lehigh	11	–	7	.611	19	–	11	.633
Army	10	–	8	.556	16	–	13	.552
Lafayette	7	–	11	.389	12	–	18	.400
Navy	5	–	13	.278	10	–	21	.323
Colgate	4	–	14	.222	6	–	24	.200
Loyola (MD)	2	–	16	.111	5	–	24	.172
† 2022 Patriot League tournament winner

The 2021–22 Army Black Knights women's basketball team represent the United States Military Academy during the 2021–22 NCAA Division I women's basketball season. The Black Knights are led by 1st-year head coach Missy Traversi, and play their home games at Christl Arena in West Point, New York as members of the Patriot League.

== Previous season ==
The Black Knights finished the 2021 season 9–11, 6–8 in Patriot League play to finish in third place in the North Division. They secured the sixth seed in the Patriot League Tournament, losing in the quarterfinals to American.

== Schedule ==
Date time, TV	Rank^{#}	Opponent^{#}	Result	Record	High points	High rebounds	High assists	Site (attendance) city, state
Non-conference regular season
November 13, 2021*; 7:00 p.m., ESPN3		at Manhattan	L 55–75	0–1	23 – Hardy	7 – Hunter	3 – Hardy	Draddy Gymnasium (140); The Bronx, NY
November 18, 2021*; 6:00 p.m., ESPN+		Quinnipiac	L 56–75	0–2	18 – Fallon	9 – Scamman	3 – Hall	Christl Arena (527); West Point, NY
November 21, 2021*; 1:30 p.m.		at Sacred Heart	W 76–68	1–2	23 – Hunter	11 – Hunter	2 – Hardy; Fallon	William H. Pitt Center; Fairfield, CT
November 24, 2021*; 1:00 p.m., ESPN+		Air Force	W 73–62	2–2	18 – Hardy	10 – Scamman	3 – Hardy	Christl Arena (568); West Point, NY
November 26, 2021*; 3:00 p.m., ESPN+		Maine	W 87–81	3–2	21 – Murray	11 – Hunter	5 – Fallon	Christl Arena (550); West Point, NY
December 1, 2021*; 7:00 p.m.		at LIU	W 74–71	4–2	24 – Hunter	14 – Hunter	6 – Hardy	Steinberg Wellness Center (126); Brooklyn, NY
December 4, 2021*; 1:00 p.m., ESPN+		Rider	L 57–59	4–3	17 – Hunter	14 – Hunter	4 – Hall	Christl Arena (516); West Point, NY
December 8, 2021*; 5:00 p.m., NEC Front Row		at Bryant	W 74–50	5–3	19 – Hall	11 – Hunter	5 – McNaughton	Chace Athletic Center (400); Smithfield, RI
December 28, 2021*; 5:00 p.m., ESPN+		at Yale	L 50–68	5–4	20 – Fallon	9 – Fallon	2 – Fallon; Sullivan	Payne Whitney Gymnasium; New Haven, CT
Patriot League regular season
January 2, 2022; 12:00 p.m., ESPN+		Bucknell	W 69–62	6–4 (1–0)	24 – Fallon	14 – Hunter	5 – Murray	Christl Arena (497); West Point, NY
January 5, 2022; 6:00 p.m., ESPN+		at Lehigh	L 55–62	6–5 (1–1)	15 – Fallon	12 – Fallon	4 – Hall	Stabler Arena (526); Bethlehem, PA
January 8, 2022; 1:00 p.m., ESPN+		Colgate	W 66–63	7–5 (2–1)	16 – Brown	14 – Hunter	5 – Fallon	Christl Arena (563); West Point, NY
January 12, 2022; 6:00 p.m., ESPN+		at Boston University	L 56–64	7–6 (2–2)	20 – Murray	10 – Hunter	8 – McNaughton	Case Gym (177); Boston, MA
January 15, 2022; 2:00 p.m., ESPN+		at Lafayette	W 62–56	8–6 (3–2)	22 – Fallon	9 – Hunter	5 – Hunter	Kirby Sports Center (236); Easton, PA
January 19, 2022; 6:00 p.m., ESPN+		at American	L 65–80	8–7 (3–3)	13 – Hunter	17 – Hunter	4 – Fallon	Bender Arena (259); Washington, D.C.
January 22, 2022; 11:00 a.m., CBSSN		at Navy	L 60–61	8–8 (3–4)	16 – Hunter	11 – Hunter	6 – McNaughton	Alumni Hall; Annapolis, MD
January 26, 2022; 6:00 p.m., ESPN+		Lehigh	W 70–57	9–8 (4–4)	22 – Murray	11 – Fallon	5 – Hall	Christl Arena (454); West Point, NY
January 29, 2022; 4:00 p.m., ESPN+		Lafayette	W 50–46	10–8 (5–4)	18 – Stralkus	10 – Hunter	6 – Fallon	Christl Arena (509); West Point, NY
January 31, 2022*; 4:00 p.m., ESPN+		Immaculata	W 78–41	11–8	11 – Rhine	10 – Muse	4 – Strippoli	Christl Arena (466); West Point, NY
February 2, 2022; 2:00 p.m., ESPN+		at Loyola	W 63–57	12–8 (6–4)	18 – Hall	8 – Fallon	3 – Fallon	Reitz Arena (124); Baltimore, MD
February 5, 2022; 12:00 p.m., ESPN+		at Holy Cross	L 54–74	12–9 (6–5)	13 – Hunter	11 – Hunter	1 – Multiple	Hart Center (102); Worcester, MA
February 9, 2022; 6:00 p.m., ESPN+		Boston University	L 56–69	12–10 (6–6)	19 – McNaughton	7 – Fallon	3 – Hunter; McNaughton	Christl Arena (477); West Point, NY
February 12, 2022; 11:00 a.m., CBSSN		Navy	W 70–66	13–10 (7–6)	17 – Fallon	8 – Fallon	5 – Fallon; Hunter	Christl Arena (3,800); West Point, NY
February 16, 2022; 7:00 p.m., ESPN+		at Colgate	W 51–38	14–10 (8–6)	24 – Fallon	11 – Fallon	3 – Fallon	Cotterell Court (120); Hamilton, NY
February 19, 2022; 1:00 p.m., ESPN+		American	W 67–62 ^{OT}	15–10 (9–6)	14 – McNaughton	11 – Hunter	3 – McNaughton	Christl Arena (571); West Point, NY
February 23, 2022; 6:00 p.m., ESPN+		at Bucknell	L 51–79	15–11 (9–7)	10 – Hall	5 – Hunter	4 – McNaughton	Sojka Pavilion (475); Lewisburg, PA
February 26, 2022; 1:00 p.m., ESPN+		Holy Cross	L 59–73	15–12 (9–8)	12 – Hunter	9 – Hunter	3 – Fallon	Christl Arena (766); West Point, NY
March 2, 2022; 6:00 p.m., ESPN+		Loyola	W 63–55	16–12 (10–8)	14 – Hunter	10 – Hunter	3 – Multiple	Christl Arena (471); West Point, NY
Patriot League tournament
March 7, 2022; 6:00 p.m., ESPN+	(6)	at (3) Boston University; Quarterfinals	L 74–80	16–13	37 – Fallon	11 – Hunter	2 – Multiple	Case Gym (358); Boston, MA
*Non-conference game. ^{#}Rankings from AP Poll. (#) Tournament seedings in parentheses. All times are in Eastern Time.
