= 2020–21 Army Black Knights women's basketball team =

Intercollegiate basketball season

2020–21 Army Black Knights women's basketball
- Conference: Patriot League
- Record: 9–11 (6–8 Patriot)
- Head coach: Dave Magarity (15th season)
- Assistant coaches: Lisa Strack; Ben Chase; Liz Flooks; Heather Stec; Margaree King Richard
- Home arena: Christl Arena

2020–21 Patriot League women's basketball standings
	Conf.				Overall
Team	W		L	PCT	W		L	PCT
North
Boston University	11	–	2	.846	12	–	3	.800
Holy Cross	7	–	7	.500	7	–	8	.467
Army	6	–	8	.429	9	–	11	.450
Colgate	1	–	8	.111	1	–	8	.111
Central
Bucknell	8	–	1	.889	9	–	1	.900
Lehigh†	8	–	5	.615	10	–	6	.625
Lafayette	5	–	7	.417	5	–	8	.385
South
American	7	–	4	.636	8	–	4	.667
Navy	5	–	4	.556	5	–	8	.385
Loyola (MD)	0	–	12	.000	0	–	13	.000
† 2021 Patriot League tournament winner Colgate suspended their season on February 18, 2021; As of July 7, 2024; Rankings from AP poll

The 2020–21 Army Black Knights women's basketball team represented the United States Military Academy during the 2020–21 NCAA Division I women's basketball season. The Black Knights were led by 15th-year head coach Dave Magarity, and played their home games at Christl Arena in West Point, New York as members of the Patriot League. They finished the season 9–11, 6–8 in Patriot League play to finish in third place in the North Division. They secured the sixth seed in the Patriot League Tournament, losing in the quarterfinals to American.

== Previous season ==
They finished the previous season 9–22, 4–14 in Patriot League play to finish in seventh place. They lost to American in the first round of the Patriot League tournament. The tournament was cancelled after the Quarterfinals due to the COVID-19 pandemic. The NCAA tournament and NIT were also cancelled due to the pandemic.

== Roster ==
2020–21 Army Black Knights women's basketball team
Players
Coaches

Pos.	#	Name	Height	Year	Previous school	Hometown
G	0	Kaci Helmick	5 ft 7 in (1.7 m)	Fr	Spruce Creek HS (FL)	Clarksville, TN
G	1	Melanie George	5 ft 5 in (1.65 m)	Fr	Fairfax HS	Fairfax, VA
G	2	Sam McNaughton	5 ft 7 in (1.7 m)	Fr	Fairfax HS	Fairfax, VA
G	3	Natalie Rhine	5 ft 6 in (1.68 m)	So	Bethlehem Catholic HS (USMAPS)	Allentown, PA
F	4	Kamryn Hall	5 ft 11 in (1.8 m)	So	C. K. McClatchy HS	Sacramento, CA
G	10	Sarah Bohn (C)	5 ft 7 in (1.7 m)	Jr	Gilmour Academy	Broadview Heights, OH
F	11	Sabria Hunter	6 ft 1 in (1.85 m)	So	Austintown Fitch HS	Austintown, OH
G	12	Lauren Lithgow	5 ft 9 in (1.75 m)	Fr	St. Rose HS	Manasquan, NJ
F	13	Lindsey Scamman	6 ft 0 in (1.83 m)	Jr	Twentynine Palms HS	Twentynine Palms, CA
G	14	Hope Brown	5 ft 9 in (1.75 m)	So	Bethlehem Catholic HS (USMAPS)	Phillipsburg, NJ
F	15	Kate Murray	6 ft 0 in (1.83 m)	Jr	Eagle HS	Boise, ID
F	22	Reagan Warren	5 ft 10 in (1.78 m)	Fr	Rowlett HS	Rowlett, TX
F	23	Taylor Sullivan	6 ft 3 in (1.91 m)	Jr	Capital HS	Helena, MT
G	24	Natalie Stralkus	5 ft 11 in (1.8 m)	Jr	The Peddie School	East Brunswick, NJ
F	25	Jessica Rawls	6 ft 0 in (1.83 m)	Sr	Central Dauphin East HS	Harrisburg, PA
G	31	Alisa Fallon	5 ft 10 in (1.78 m)	Jr	Maine West HS	Des Plaines, IL
F	33	Liz Layne	6 ft 0 in (1.83 m)	Sr	Elkhorn South HS	Omaha, NE
F	35	McKenzie Muse	6 ft 2 in (1.88 m)	Fr	Bryant HS	Bryant, AR

Head coach

- Dave Magarity (Saint Francis (PA))

Assistant coach(es)

- Lisa Strack (American)
- Ben Chase (Emerson)
- Liz Flooks (Niagara)
- Heather Stec (Siena)
- Margaree King Richard (Army)

Legend

- (C) Team captain
- (S) Suspended
- (I) Ineligible
- (W) Walk-on
- Injured
- Current redshirt

Roster
Last update: January 10, 2021

== Schedule ==
Date time, TV	Rank^{#}	Opponent^{#}	Result	Record	High points	High rebounds	High assists	Site (attendance) city, state
Non-conference regular season
November 25, 2020; 2:00 p.m., ESPN+		Hofstra	L 78–81	0–1	23 – Fallon	11 – Fallon	6 – Bohn	Christl Arena (52); West Point, NY
November 29, 2020; 3:00 p.m., ESPN+		Iona	W 67–52	1–1	19 – Murray	12 – Murray	4 – Bohn	Christl Arena; West Point, NY
December 2, 2020; 7:00 p.m., ESPN+		at Rider	W 70–55	2–1	25 – Fallon	18 – Murray	6 – Sullivan	Alumni Gymnasium (1); Lawrenceville, NJ
December 5, 2020; 1:00 p.m., ESPN+		Marist	L 55–83	2–2	10 – Fallon	9 – Fallon	5 – Bohn	Christl Arena (38); West Point, NY
December 12, 2020; 2:00 p.m., ESPN+		at Quinnipiac	W 51–50	3–2	16 – Murray	12 – Fallon	5 – Bohn	People's United Center; Hamden, CT
Patriot League regular season
January 2, 2021; 3:00 p.m., ESPN+		Colgate	L 76–87	3–3 (0–1)	19 – Lithgow	6 – Helmick	6 – Fallon	Christl Arena; West Point, NY
January 3, 2021; 2:30 p.m., ESPN+		Colgate	W 72–53	4–3 (1–1)	16 – Fallon; Lithgow	12 – Rawls; Sullivan	7 – Fallon	Christl Arena (26); West Point, NY
January 9, 2021; 3:00 p.m., ESPN+		Holy Cross	L 46–80	4–4 (1–2)	13 – Helmick	6 – Sullivan	2 – Fallon; Rawls	Christl Arena (16); West Point, NY
January 10, 2021; 3:00 p.m., ESPN+		at Holy Cross	L 42–61	4–5 (1–3)	15 – Fallon; Stralkus	9 – Fallon	5 – Bohn	Hart Center; Worcester, MA
January 16, 2021; 3:00 p.m., ESPN+		Boston University	L 45–59	4–6 (1–4)	12 – Stralkus	9 – Fallon	4 – Bohn; Fallon	Christl Arena (8); West Point, NY
January 17, 2021; 3:00 p.m., ESPN+		Boston University	W 54–43	5–6 (2–4)	13 – Bohn	8 – Fallon	3 – Fallon	Christl Arena; West Point, NY
January 23, 2021; 1:00 p.m., ESPN+		Navy	L 49–63	5–7 (2–5)	13 – Bohn	8 – Fallon	3 – Bohn; Fallon	Christl Arena (202); West Point, NY
January 24, 2021; 1:00 p.m., ESPN+		Navy	W 63–58	6–7 (3–5)	14 – Fallon	9 – Murray	4 – Fallon; McNaughton	Christl Arena; West Point, NY
January 30, 2021; 3:00 p.m., ESPN+		at Colgate	W 79–53	7–7 (4–5)	19 – Lithgow	11 – Sullivan	7 – Fallon	Cotterell Court; Hamilton, NY
January 31, 2021; 3:00 p.m., ESPN+		at Colgate	W 79–45	8–7 (5–5)	16 – Sullivan	12 – Murray	5 – Fallon	Cotterell Court; Hamilton, NY
February 6, 2021; 2:30 p.m., ESPN+		at Holy Cross	L 49–61	8–8 (5–6)	12 – Fallon	10 – Fallon	2 – Fallon	Hart Center; Worcester, MA
February 7, 2021; 3:00 p.m., ESPN+		Holy Cross	W 60–42	9–8 (6–6)	20 – Hunter	6 – Murray; Stralkus	3 – Bohn	Christl Arena; West Point, NY
February 13, 2021; 1:00 p.m., ESPN+		at Boston University	L 41–82	9–9 (6–7)	7 – Hunter; Lithgow	4 – Hunter; Fallon	1 – Multiple	Case Gym; Boston, MA
February 14, 2021; 1:00 p.m., ESPN+		at Boston University	L 53–65	9–10 (6–8)	17 – Fallon	7 – Fallon	5 – Fallon	Case Gym; Boston, MA
February 20, 2021; 11:00 a.m., CBSSN		at Navy	Cancelled					Alumni Hall; Annapolis, MD
February 21, 2021; 12:00 p.m., CBSSN		at Navy	Cancelled					Alumni Hall; Annapolis, MD
February 27, 2021, ESPN+		vs. Holy Cross	Cancelled					
February 28, 2021, ESPN+		vs. Holy Cross	Cancelled					
Patriot League tournament
Mar 7, 2021; 4:00 p.m., ESPN+	(6)	(3) American; Quarterfinals	L 56–76	9–11	17 – Hunter	5 – Fallon	2 – Lithgow; Sullivan	Bender Arena; Washington, D.C.
*Non-conference game. ^{#}Rankings from AP Poll. (#) Tournament seedings in parentheses. All times are in Eastern Time.

== See also ==
- 2020–21 Army Black Knights men's basketball team
