= 2021–22 American Eagles women's basketball team =

Intercollegiate basketball season

2021–22 American Eagles women's basketball

Patriot League tournament champions

NCAA tournament, first round
- Conference: Patriot League
- Record: 23–9 (13–5 Patriot)
- Head coach: Megan Gebbia (9th season)
- Assistant coaches: Tiffany Coll; Nikki Flores; Emily Stallings
- Home arena: Bender Arena

2021–22 Patriot League women's basketball standings
| | Conf. | | | | Overall |
| Team | W | | L | PCT | W | | L | PCT |
|---|---|---|---|---|---|---|---|---|
| Holy Cross | 14 | – | 4 | .778 | 20 | – | 11 | .645 |
| American † | 13 | – | 5 | .722 | 23 | – | 9 | .719 |
| Boston University | 12 | – | 6 | .667 | 17 | – | 14 | .548 |
| Bucknell | 12 | – | 6 | .667 | 24 | – | 10 | .706 |
| Lehigh | 11 | – | 7 | .611 | 19 | – | 11 | .633 |
| Army | 10 | – | 8 | .556 | 16 | – | 13 | .552 |
| Lafayette | 7 | – | 11 | .389 | 12 | – | 18 | .400 |
| Navy | 5 | – | 13 | .278 | 10 | – | 21 | .323 |
| Colgate | 4 | – | 14 | .222 | 6 | – | 24 | .200 |
| Loyola (MD) | 2 | – | 16 | .111 | 5 | – | 24 | .172 |
† 2022 Patriot League tournament winner

The 2021–22 American Eagles women's basketball team represented the American University Eagles during the 2021–22 NCAA Division I women's basketball season. The Eagles were led by ninth-year head coach Megan Gebbia and played their home games at Bender Arena as members of the Patriot League.

They finished the season 23–9 overall and 13–5 in Patriot League play to finish in second place. As the second seed in the Patriot League tournament, they earned a bye into the quarterfinals, where they defeated Lafayette, Boston University and Bucknell to win the title. They received an automatic bid to the NCAA tournament, where they were the fourteenth seed in the Wichita Region. They were defeated in the first round by Michigan to end their season.

== Previous season ==
They finished the previous season 7–4, 6–3 in Patriot League play, to finish in first place in the South Division. They earned a bye in to the quarterfinals of the Patriot League tournament, where they defeated Army, before losing to Boston University in the semifinals. They were not invited to the NCAA tournament or the WNIT.

== Roster ==
2021–22 American Eagles women's basketball team
Players
Coaches

| Pos. | # | Name | Height | Year | Previous school | Hometown |
|---|---|---|---|---|---|---|
| G | 2 | Ivy Bales | 5 ft 10 in (1.78 m) | So | Gatlinburg-Pittman HS | Gatlinburg, TN |
| G | 3 | Bailey Garbee | 5 ft 11 in (1.8 m) | Fr | Quaker Valley HS | Sewickley, PA |
| G | 4 | Emily Fisher | 5 ft 7 in (1.7 m) | Sr | Emmaus College | Melbourne, Australia |
| G | 5 | Sadie Stetson | 5 ft 7 in (1.7 m) | Jr | St. Johnsbury Academy | Waterford, VT |
| G | 10 | Jade Edwards | 5 ft 10 in (1.78 m) | Sr | The Latin School of Chicago | Chicago, IL |
| G | 11 | Jordyn Meunier | 5 ft 10 in (1.78 m) | Fr | Williston Northampton School | Longmeadow, MA |
| G | 13 | Kayla Henning | 5 ft 7 in (1.7 m) | So | Evanston Township HS | Evanston, IL |
| F | 14 | Taylor Brown | 6 ft 1 in (1.85 m) | Sr | Lakeville North HS | Lakeville, MN |
| F | 15 | Karla Vres | 6 ft 3 in (1.91 m) | Jr | JENSEN gymnasium Södra (Sweden) | Zagreb, Croatia |
| G | 21 | Maddie Doring | 5 ft 11 in (1.8 m) | Sr | St. John Vianney HS | Sayreville, NJ |
| G | 22 | Riley DeRubbo | 5 ft 8 in (1.73 m) | So | Trinity HS | Washington, PA |
| F | 23 | Lauren Stack | 6 ft 2 in (1.88 m) | Jr | Benet Academy | St. Charles, IL |
| G | 24 | Laura Graytok | 5 ft 8 in (1.73 m) | Sr | Greater Latrobe Senior HS | Latrobe, PA |
| F | 44 | Emily Johns | 6 ft 1 in (1.85 m) | Sr | Washington Township HS | Washington Township, NJ |

Head coach

- Megan Gebbia (Towson)

Assistant coach(es)

- Tiffany Coll (UMBC)
- Nikki Flores (Marist)
- Emily Stallings (Marist)

Legend

- (C) Team captain
- (S) Suspended
- (I) Ineligible
- (W) Walk-on
- Injured
- Current redshirt

Roster
Last update: May 20, 2022

== Schedule ==
| Date time, TV | Rank^{#} | Opponent^{#} | Result | Record | Site (attendance) city, state |
Non-conference regular season
| November 9, 2021; 5:30 p.m., ESPN+ | | at George Washington | L 47–58 | 0–1 | Charles E. Smith Center (417); Washington, D.C. |
| November 12, 2021; 7:00 p.m., ESPN3 | | at Marist | W 59–52 | 1–1 | McCann Arena (1,373); Poughkeepsie, NY |
| November 13, 2021; 3:00 p.m., ESPN3 | | at Vermont | W 68–61 ^{OT} | 2–1 | Patrick Gym (290); Burlington, VT |
| November 17, 2021; 8:00 p.m., BTN Plus | | at Minnesota | L 56–73 | 2–2 | Williams Arena (2,643); Minneapolis, MN |
| November 23, 2021; 7:00 p.m., ESPN+ | | George Mason | W 69–61 | 3–2 | Bender Arena (349); Washington, D.C. |
| December 1, 2021; 7:00 p.m., ESPN+ | | UMBC | W 55–47 | 4–2 | Bender Arena (433); Washington, D.C. |
| December 5, 2021; 6:00 p.m., ESPN+ | | Radford | W 68–58 | 5–2 | Bender Arena (364); Washington, D.C. |
| December 7, 2021; 7:00 p.m., ACCNX | | at Virginia | W 69–56 | 6–2 | John Paul Jones Arena (1,441); Charlottesville, VA |
| December 11, 2021; 2:00 p.m., ESPN+ | | Towson | L 61–79 | 6–3 | Bender Arena (452); Washington, D.C. |
| December 18, 2021; 3:00 p.m. | | at Longwood | W 62–58 | 7–3 | Willett Hall (218); Farmville, VA |
| December 21, 2021; 1:00 p.m. | | at Howard | Canceled | | Burr Gymnasium; Washington, D.C. |
Patriot League regular season
| January 5, 2022; 6:00 p.m., ESPN+ | | Colgate | W 66–52 | 8–3 (1–0) | Bender Arena (220); Washington, D.C. |
| January 8, 2022; 1:00 p.m., ESPN+ | | at Boston University | L 46–69 | 8–4 (1–1) | Case Gym (187); Boston, MA |
| January 12, 2022; 6:00 p.m., ESPN+ | | Holy Cross | W 52–39 | 9–4 (2–1) | Bender Arena (269); Washington, D.C. |
| January 16, 2022; 4:00 p.m., CBSSN | | at Bucknell | L 52–62 | 9–5 (2–2) | Sojka Pavilion (428); Lewisburg, PA |
| January 19, 2022; 6:00 p.m., ESPN+ | | Army | W 80–65 | 10–5 (3–2) | Bender Arena (259); Washington, D.C. |
| January 22, 2022; 2:00 p.m., ESPN+ | | Loyola (MD) | W 53–49 | 11–5 (4–2) | Bender Arena (472); Washington, D.C. |
| January 26, 2022; 5:00 p.m., ESPN+ | | at Holy Cross | L 44–55 | 11–6 (4–3) | Hart Center (92); Worcester, MA |
| January 29, 2022; 2:00 p.m., ESPN+ | | Navy | W 69–60 | 12–6 (5–3) | Bender Arena (411); Washington, D.C. |
| February 1, 2022; 6:00 p.m., ESPN+ | | at Lafayette | W 58–51 | 13–6 (6–3) | Kirby Sports Center (217); Easton, PA |
| February 5, 2022; 2:00 p.m., ESPN+ | | at Colgate | L 60–74 | 13–7 (6–4) | Cotterell Court (163); Hamilton, NY |
| February 9, 2022; 6:00 p.m., ESPN+ | | Bucknell | W 56–48 | 14–7 (7–4) | Bender Arena (559); Washington, D.C. |
| February 12, 2022; 2:00 p.m., ESPN+ | | Boston University | W 70–57 | 15–7 (8–4) | Bender Arena (611); Washington, D.C. |
| February 16, 2022; 7:00 p.m., ESPN+ | | at Navy | W 54–43 | 16–7 (9–4) | Alumni Hall (402); Annapolis, MD |
| February 19, 2022; 1:00 p.m., ESPN+ | | at Army | L 62–67 | 16–8 (9–5) | Christl Arena (571); West Point, NY |
| February 22, 2022; 3:00 p.m., ESPN+ | | Lehigh | W 64–45 | 17–8 (10–5) | Bender Arena (168); Washington, D.C. |
| February 23, 2022; 7:00 p.m., ESPN+ | | Lehigh | W 61–52 | 18–8 (11–5) | Bender Arena (0); Washington, D.C. |
| February 26, 2022; 4:00 p.m., ESPN+ | | at Loyola (MD) | W 49–48 | 19–8 (12–5) | Reitz Arena (384); Baltimore, MD |
| March 2, 2022; 7:00 p.m., ESPN+ | | LaFayette | W 62–48 | 20–8 (13–5) | Bender Arena (462); Washington, D.C. |
Patriot League tournament
| March 7, 2022; 7:00 p.m., ESPN+ | (2) | vs. (7) LaFayette; Quarterfinals | W 54–48 | 21–8 | Bender Arena (283); Washington, D.C. |
| March 10, 2022; 6:00 p.m., ESPN+ | (2) | vs. (3) Boston University; Semifinals | W 70–48 | 22–8 | Bender Arena (386); Washington, D.C. |
| March 13, 2022; Noon, CBSSN | (2) | vs. (4) Bucknell; Final | W 65–54 | 23–8 | Bender Arena (1,107); Washington, D.C. |
NCAA tournament
| March 19, 2022; 3:30 p.m., ESPN2 | (14) | at (3) No. 12 Michigan; First round | L 39–74 | 23–9 | Crisler Center (6,741); Ann Arbor, MI |
*Non-conference game. ^{#}Rankings from AP poll. (#) Tournament seedings in parentheses. W=Wichita. All times are in Eastern.

== Rankings ==
Ranking movements Legend: — = Not ranked
| | Week | | | | | | | | | | | | | | | | | | |
| Poll | Pre | 1 | 2 | 3 | 4 | 5 | 6 | 7 | 8 | 9 | 10 | 11 | 12 | 13 | 14 | 15 | 16 | 17 | Final |
|---|---|---|---|---|---|---|---|---|---|---|---|---|---|---|---|---|---|---|---|
| AP | — | — | — | — | — | — | — | — | — | — | — | — | — | — | — | — | — | — | — |
| Coaches | — | — | — | — | — | — | — | — | — | — | — | — | — | — | — | — | — | — | — |

Legend
| | Increase in ranking |
| | Decrease in ranking |
| | Not ranked previous week |
| (RV) | Received votes |
| (NR) | Not ranked and did not receive votes |

The Coaches Poll did not release a Week 2 poll, and the AP poll did not release a poll after the NCAA tournament.
