= 1986–87 Marist Red Foxes men's basketball team =

American college basketball season

1986–87 Marist Red Foxes men's basketball
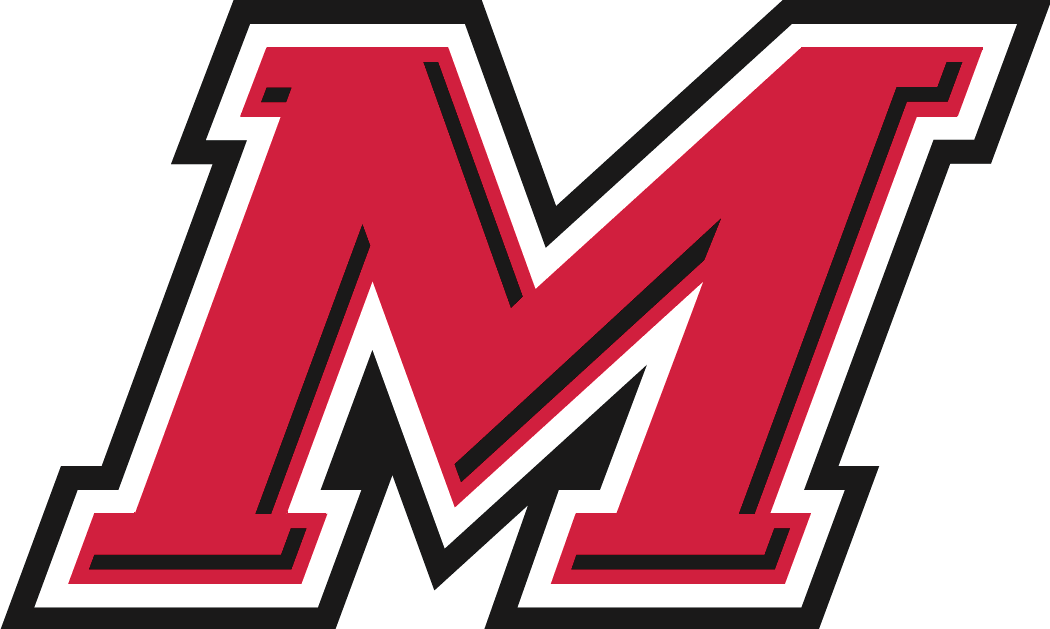

ECAC Metro regular season champions ECAC Metro tournament champions

NCAA tournament, first round
- Conference: Eastern Collegiate Athletic Conference Metro
- Record: 20–10 (15–1 ECACM)
- Head coach: Dave Magarity (1st season)
- Home arena: McCann Recreation Center

1986–87 ECAC Metro men's basketball standings
	Conf.				Overall
Team	W		L	PCT	W		L	PCT
Marist †	15	–	1	.938	20	–	10	.667
Fairleigh Dickinson	11	–	5	.688	19	–	10	.655
Loyola (MD)	10	–	6	.625	15	–	14	.517
Wagner	8	–	8	.500	16	–	13	.552
Robert Morris	7	–	9	.438	13	–	14	.481
St. Francis (PA)	7	–	9	.438	11	–	16	.407
Long Island	5	–	11	.313	13	–	14	.481
St. Francis (NY)	5	–	11	.313	11	–	16	.407
Monmouth	4	–	12	.250	8	–	19	.296
† 1987 ECAC Metro tournament winner Rankings from AP Poll

The 1986–87 Marist Red Foxes men's basketball team represented Marist College in the 1986–87 NCAA Division I men's basketball season. The Red Foxes, led by first-year head coach Dave Magarity, played their home games at the James J. McCann Recreation Center in Poughkeepsie, New York as members of the ECAC Metro Conference. They finished the season 20–11, 15–1 in ECACM play, finishing in first place and winning the ECAC regular season championship. As the No. 1 seed in the ECAC tournament, they advanced to the championship game, where they defeated second-seeded Fairleigh Dickinson 64–55 in overtime to win the school's second consecutive ECAC Metro men's basketball tournament title. The Red Foxes earned the automatic bid to the 1986 NCAA tournament, receiving a 14 seed in the West region. They were defeated in the first round 68–93 by No. 12 Pittsburgh.

== Coaching change ==
In May 1986, several Marist players met with senior college administrators to discuss their complaints about the handling of the team by head coach Matthew Furjanic Jr. Several of them indicated they would not return for the 1986–87 if Furjanic, who had one year left on his contract, remained as head coach. Furjanic took over for Marist in the fall of 1984 after the forced resignation of 5-month term coach Mike Perry, who admitted committing violations of NCAA rules by offering extra benefits to a player to mask allegations and complaints of sexual advances towards the prospective recruit. Furjanic would step down a couple weeks later, citing personal reasons. On June 10, 1986, Marist hired former Saint Francis (PA) head coach Dave Magarity to replace him.

== NCAA penalties ==
While the NCAA was investigating the self reported violations of 1984, 2 days before the 1986–87 season was to begin, the NCAA declared Rik Smits, Miroslav Pecarski, and Rudy Bourgarel ineligible because the NCAA said that Mike Perry illegally recruited them for Marist. The NCAA Council's subcommittee on eligibility issued a decision that Pecarski and Bourgarel's violations were minor, and their suspensions would last seven games, although stats seem to indicate it was reduced to four. Smits, facing a complete season suspension, was eventually decided on nine games. Without Smits, Marist started the season 3–6, and losing the first game he returned to.

== Previous season ==
The Red Foxes finished the 1985–86 season 19–12, 11–5 in ECACM play to finish in second place. As the No. 2 seed in the ECAC tournament, they advanced to the championship game, where they defeated top-seeded Fairleigh Dickinson 57–56 in overtime to win the school's first ECAC Metro men's basketball tournament title. The Red Foxes earned the automatic bid to the 1986 NCAA tournament, receiving a 15 seed in the Southeast region. They were defeated in the first round 53–68 by No. 6 Georgia Tech.

== Roster ==
1986–87 Marist Red Foxes men's basketball team
Players
Coaches

Pos.	#	Name	Height	Weight	Year	Hometown
G	3	Drafton Davis	6 ft 0 in (1.83 m)	165 lb (75 kg)	Jr	Bronx, NY
F	10	Ted Sharpenter	6 ft 5 in (1.96 m)	—	Fr	Chicago, IL
G	11	Matt Schoenfeld	5 ft 9 in (1.75 m)	160 lb (73 kg)	Fr	Roselle, NJ
G	14	Chris Green	6 ft 0 in (1.83 m)	—	Fr	Boston, MA
G	20	John McDonough	6 ft 3 in (1.91 m)	180 lb (82 kg)	Jr	Lincroft, NJ
G	23	Ron McCants	6 ft 2 in (1.88 m)	175 lb (79 kg)	Sr	Bronx, NY
G	25	Tim Murphy	6 ft 4 in (1.93 m)	185 lb (84 kg)	Sr	Cromwell, CT
G	32	Darryl McClung	6 ft 3 in (1.91 m)	—	Jr
F	35	Peter Krasovec	6 ft 7 in (2.01 m)	215 lb (98 kg)	So	Budapest, Hungary
C	40	Rudy Bourgarel	7 ft 0 in (2.13 m)	225 lb (102 kg)	So	Les Abymes, Guadeloupe
F	43	Miroslav Pecarski	6 ft 11 in (2.11 m)	222 lb (101 kg)	So	Novi Sad, Yugoslavia
F	44	Mark Shamley	6 ft 6 in (1.98 m)	190 lb (86 kg)	Sr	White Plains, NY
C	45	Rik Smits	7 ft 3 in (2.21 m)	250 lb (113 kg)	Jr	Eindhoven, Netherlands
G		Ernest McFadden	6 ft 0 in (1.83 m)	—	Sr

Head coach

- Dave Magarity (Saint Francis (PA))

Assistant coach(es)

- Jeff Bower
- Bogdan Jovicic
- Tim Murray

Legend

- (C) Team captain
- (S) Suspended
- (I) Ineligible
- (W) Walk-on
- Injured
- Current redshirt

Roster
Last update: January 7, 2021

== Schedule and results ==
Date time, TV	Rank^{#}	Opponent^{#}	Result	Record	Site (attendance) city, state
Regular season
November 28, 1986*		vs. Youngstown State; Joe Lapchick Tournament	L 52–56	0–1	Carnesecca Arena (6008); Queens, New York
November 29, 1986*		vs. Southern University	L 82–89	0–2	Carnesecca Arena (6008); Queens, New York
December 5, 1986*		Maryland Eastern Shore; Pepsi Marist Classic	W 85–54	1–2	McCann Recreation Center (2195); Poughkeepsie, New York
December 6, 1986*		Lafayette; Pepsi Marist Classic	W 65–64	2–2	McCann Recreation Center (2206); Poughkeepsie, New York
December 10, 1986*		Fairfield	L 54–60 ^{OT}	2–3	McCann Recreation Center (2100); Poughkeepsie, New York
December 13, 1986*		vs. Hofstra	W 72–71	3–3	Madison Square Garden (11839); New York City
December 20, 1986*		Saint Peter's	L 50–52 ^{OT}	3–4	McCann Recreation Center (1880); Poughkeepsie, New York
December 23, 1986*		at Utica College	L 57–59	3–5	Harold Thomas Clark Jr. Athletic Center (673); Utica, New York
December 30, 1986*		Iona	L 53–62 ^{OT}	3–6	McCann Recreation Center (2430); Poughkeepsie, New York
January 3, 1987*		at Bucknell	L 64–66	3–7	Davis Gym (720); Lewisburg, Pennsylvania
January 5, 1987		Wagner	W 73–62	4–7 (1–0)	McCann Recreation Center (2809); Poughkeepsie, New York
January 7, 1987		at St. Francis (NY)	L 53–54	4–8 (1–1)	Pope Physical Education Center (1050); Brooklyn, New York
January 13, 1987		at Long Island University	W 92–70	5–8 (2–1)	Brooklyn Paramount Theater (700); Brooklyn, New York
January 17, 1987		at Loyola (MD)	W 59–55	6–8 (3–1)	Reitz Arena (2200); Baltimore, Maryland
January 20, 1987*		at Cleveland State	L 49–52	6–9	Woodling Gym (5099); Cleveland, Ohio
January 24, 1987		Robert Morris	W 63–52	7–9 (4–1)	McCann Recreation Center (2908); Poughkeepsie, New York
January 28, 1987		at Fairleigh Dickinson	W 75–73	8–9 (5–1)	FDU Gym (1143); Hackensack, New Jersey
February 2, 1987		Saint Francis (PA)	W 75–52	9–9 (6–1)	McCann Recreation Center (2898); Poughkeepsie, New York
February 4, 1987		Monmouth	W 77–60	10–9 (7–1)	McCann Recreation Center (2809); Poughkeepsie, New York
February 7, 1987		Long Island	W 74–55	11–9 (8–1)	McCann Recreation Center (3189); Poughkeepsie, New York
February 9, 1987		Loyola (MD)	W 89–71	12–9 (9–1)	McCann Recreation Center (2888); Poughkeepsie, New York
February 11, 1987		St. Francis (NY)	W 64–53	13–9 (10–1)	McCann Recreation Center (2819); Poughkeepsie, New York
February 14, 1987		at Monmouth	W 70–52	14–9 (11–1)	William T. Boylan Gymnasium (1235); West Long Branch, New Jersey
February 18, 1987		Fairleigh Dickinson	W 91–88	15–9 (12–1)	McCann Recreation Center (3589); Poughkeepsie, New York
February 21, 1987		vs. Wagner	W 80–64	16–9 (13–1)	Meadowlands Arena (15287); East Rutherford, New Jersey
February 26, 1987		at Saint Francis (PA)	W 84–78	17–9 (14–1)	DeGol Arena (1300); Loretto, Pennsylvania
February 28, 1987		at Robert Morris	W 61–57	18–9 (15–1)	Charles L. Sewall Center (2051); Moon Township, Pennsylvania
ECAC Metro tournament
March 6, 1987	(1)	(4) Wagner; Semifinals	W 59–57	19–9	McCann Recreation Center (3809); Poughkeepsie, New York
March 7, 1987	(1)	(2) Fairleigh Dickinson; Championship	W 64–55	20–9	McCann Recreation Center (3898); Poughkeepsie, New York
NCAA tournament
March 13, 1987*	(14 W)	vs. (3 W) No. 12 Pittsburgh; 1st round	L 68–93	20–10	McKale Center (12885); Tucson, Arizona
*Non-conference game. ^{#}Rankings from AP Poll. (#) Tournament seedings in parentheses. All times are in Eastern.
