= 2022 Patriot League women's basketball tournament =

- Classification: Division I
- Season: 2021–22
- Teams: 10
- Site: Campus sites
- Television: ESPN+, CBSSN

The 2022 Patriot League women's basketball tournament was the conference postseason tournament for the Patriot League. The tournament was held March 5, 7, 10, and 13, 2022, at campus sites of the higher seeds. The winner receives the conference's automatic bid to the NCAA tournament.

2021–22 Patriot League women's basketball standings
	Conf.				Overall
Team	W		L	PCT	W		L	PCT
Holy Cross	14	–	4	.778	20	–	11	.645
American †	13	–	5	.722	23	–	9	.719
Boston University	12	–	6	.667	17	–	14	.548
Bucknell	12	–	6	.667	24	–	10	.706
Lehigh	11	–	7	.611	19	–	11	.633
Army	10	–	8	.556	16	–	13	.552
Lafayette	7	–	11	.389	12	–	18	.400
Navy	5	–	13	.278	10	–	21	.323
Colgate	4	–	14	.222	6	–	24	.200
Loyola (MD)	2	–	16	.111	5	–	24	.172
† 2022 Patriot League tournament winner

== Seeds ==
All ten teams in the conference standings qualify for the tournament. The teams are seeded by record in conference, with a tiebreaker system to seed teams with identical conference records.

The tiebreakers used by the Patriot League are: 1) head-to-head record of teams with identical record, 2) comparison of records against individual teams in the conference starting with the top-ranked team(s) and working down, 3) NCAA NET Rankings available on day following the conclusion of Patriot League regular-season play and 4) comparison of winning percentage versus out-of-league common opponents. Boston University was given the 3 seed over Bucknell due to a head-to-head sweep.

Seed	School	Conference	Tiebreaker
1	Holy Cross	14-4	
2	American	13-5	
3	Boston University	12-6	2-0 vs. Bucknell
4	Bucknell	12-6	0-2 vs. Boston University
5	Lehigh	11-7	
6	Army	10-8	
7	Lafayette	7-11	
8	Navy	5-13	
9	Colgate	4-14	
10	Loyola (MD)	2-16	

== Schedule ==
Game	Time	Matchup	Score	Television	Attendance
First round – Saturday, March 5
1	1:00pm	No. 9 Colgate at No. 8 Navy	55-60	ESPN+	
2	2:00 pm	No. 10 Loyola (MD) at No. 7 Lafayette	49-58	ESPN+	
Quarterfinals – Monday, March 7
3	7:00 pm	No. 8 Navy at No. 1 Holy Cross	50-49	ESPN+	
4	7:00 pm	No. 7 Lafayette at No. 2 American	48-54	ESPN+	
5	6:00 pm	No. 6 Army at No. 3 Boston University	74-80	ESPN+	
6	6:00 pm	No. 5 Lehigh at No. 4 Bucknell	53-56	ESPN+	
Semifinals – Thursday, March 10
7	6:00pm	No. 8 Navy at No. 4 Bucknell	44-64	ESPN+	
8	6:00pm	No. 3 Boston University at No. 2 American	48-70	ESPN+	
Championship – Sunday, March 13
9	Noon	No. 4 Bucknell at No. 2 American	54-65	CBSSN	
Game times in ET. Rankings denote tournament seeding. All games hosted by higher-seeded team.

== Bracket ==
First round Saturday, March 5, 2022; ESPN+
8	Navy	60
9	Colgate	55
7	Lafayette	58
10	Loyola (MD)	49

Quarterfinals; Monday, March 7, 2022; ESPN+
1	Holy Cross	49
8	Navy	50
4	Bucknell	56
5	Lehigh	53
3	Boston University	80
6	Army	74
2	American	54
7	Lafayette	48

Semifinals; Thursday, March 10, 2022; ESPN+
8	Navy	44
4	Bucknell	64
3	Boston University	48
2	American	70

Championship; Sunday, March 13, 2022; CBSSN
4	Bucknell	54
2	American	65

* denotes overtime period
