= 2020–21 Bucknell Bison women's basketball team =

Intercollegiate basketball season

2020–21 Bucknell Bison women's basketball
- Conference: Patriot League
- Record: 0–0 (0–0 Patriot)
- Head coach: Trevor Woodruff (2nd season)
- Assistant coaches: Jim Reed; Kelly Mazzante; Taylor Coleman
- Home arena: Sojka Pavilion

2020–21 Patriot League women's basketball standings
	Conf.				Overall
Team	W		L	PCT	W		L	PCT
North
Boston University	11	–	2	.846	12	–	3	.800
Holy Cross	7	–	7	.500	7	–	8	.467
Army	6	–	8	.429	9	–	11	.450
Colgate	1	–	8	.111	1	–	8	.111
Central
Bucknell	8	–	1	.889	9	–	1	.900
Lehigh†	8	–	5	.615	10	–	6	.625
Lafayette	5	–	7	.417	5	–	8	.385
South
American	7	–	4	.636	8	–	4	.667
Navy	5	–	4	.556	5	–	8	.385
Loyola (MD)	0	–	12	.000	0	–	13	.000
† 2021 Patriot League tournament winner Colgate suspended their season on February 18, 2021; As of July 7, 2024; Rankings from AP poll

The 2020–21 Bucknell Bison women's basketball team represented the Bucknell University Bison during the 2020–21 NCAA Division I women's basketball season. The Bison were led by second-year head coach Trevor Woodruff and played their home games at Sojka Pavilion as members of the Patriot League.

== Previous season ==
The Bison finished the previous season 24–6, 16–2 in Patriot League play to finish in first place. They advanced to the semifinals of the Patriot League Tournament before it was cancelled due to the COVID-19 pandemic. The NCAA tournament and NIT were also cancelled due to the pandemic.

== Roster ==
2020–21 Bucknell Bison women's basketball team
Players
Coaches

Pos.	#	Name	Height	Year	Previous school	Hometown
F	3	Tessa Brugler	6 ft 1 in (1.85 m)	Sr	Nazareth Area HS	Nazareth, PA
G	4	Caroline Dingler	5 ft 9 in (1.75 m)	Fr	Darlington School	Rome, GA
G	11	Taylor O’Brien	5 ft 9 in (1.75 m)	Jr	Plymouth-Whitemarsh HS	Lafayette, Hill, PA
G	12	Marly Walls	5 ft 8 in (1.73 m)	Jr	Nelson County HS	Bardstown, KY
G	14	Tai Johnson	5 ft 8 in (1.73 m)	So	Mars Area HS	Gibsonia, PA
F	20	Kaylee Reinbeau	6 ft 0 in (1.83 m)	Fr	Wheeling Central Catholic HS	Wheeling, WV
F	21	Carly Krsul	6 ft 1 in (1.85 m)	So	Robbinsdale Armstrong HS	Plymouth, MN
G	23	Ally Johnson	5 ft 10 in (1.78 m)	Sr	Beechwood HS	Fort Mitchell, KY
F	24	Autumn Ceppi	6 ft 1 in (1.85 m)	Sr	Dana Hall School	Bedford, MA
G	25	Abby Kapp	6 ft 0 in (1.83 m)	Sr	Boyertown Area Senior High School	Barto, PA
F	31	Nicole Davis	6 ft 4 in (1.93 m)	Fr	Monacan HS	Richmond, VA
F	33	Julie Kulesza	5 ft 9 in (1.75 m)	Fr	Conrad Schools of Science	Wilmington, DE
F	52	Emma Shaffer	6 ft 2 in (1.88 m)	So	Ursuline Academy	Cincinnati, OH

Head coach

- Trevor Woodruff (Misericordia)

Assistant coach(es)

- Jim Reed (Bucknell)
- Kelly Mazzante (Penn State)
- Taylor Coleman (DeSales)

Legend

- (C) Team captain
- (S) Suspended
- (I) Ineligible
- (W) Walk-on
- Injured
- Current redshirt

Roster
Last update: November 28, 2020

== Schedule ==
Date time, TV	Rank^{#}	Opponent^{#}	Result	Record	High points	High rebounds	High assists	Site (attendance) city, state
Non-conference regular season
Patriot League regular season
January 2, 2021		Navy						Sojka Pavilion; Lewisburg, PA
January 3, 2021		at Navy						Alumni Hall; Annapolis, MD
January 9, 2021		at Lafayette						Kirby Sports Center; Easton, PA
January 10, 2021		Lafayette						Sojka Pavilion; Lewisburg, PA
January 16, 2021		at Lehigh						Stabler Arena; Bethlehem, PA
January 17, 2021		Lehigh						Sojka Pavilion; Lewisburg, PA
January 23, 2021		Colgate						Sojka Pavilion; Lewisburg, PA
January 24, 2021		Colgate						Sojka Pavilion; Lewisburg, PA
January 30, 2021		Lehigh						Sojka Pavilion; Lewisburg, PA
January 31, 2021		at Lehigh						Stabler Arena; Bethlehem, PA
February 6, 2021		Loyola (MD)						Sojka Pavilion; Lewisburg, PA
February 7, 2021		at Loyola (MD)						Reitz Arena; Baltimore, MD
February 13, 2021		at American						Bender Arena; Washington, D.C.
February 14, 2021		American						Sojka Pavilion; Lewisburg, PA
February 20, 2021		Lafayette						Sojka Pavilion; Lewisburg, PA
February 21, 2021		at Lafayette						Kirby Sports Center; Easton, PA
Patriot League Tournament
		vs.			– –			
*Non-conference game. ^{#}Rankings from AP Poll. (#) Tournament seedings in parentheses. All times are in Eastern Time.

== See also ==
- 2020–21 Bucknell Bison men's basketball team
