= Missy Traversi =

American basketball player and coach

Current position
- Title: Head coach
- Team: Merrimack
- Conference: MAAC
- Record: 0–0 (–)

Biographical details
- Education: University of Maine (B.A., 2005); Ohio University (M.S., 2013)

Playing career

College:
- 2001–2005: Maine

Professional:
- 2005–2006: Brahe Basket

Coaching career (HC unless noted)
- 2006–2007: Brookline HS
- 2007–2008: Jämtland Basket (assistant)
- 2008–2010: Dover-Sherborn HS
- 2010–2011: Harvard (assistant)
- 2011–2014: Attleboro HS
- 2014–2016: Wheelock
- 2016–2021: Adelphi
- 2021–2025: Army
- 2026–present: Merrimack

Administrative career (AD unless noted)
- 2016–2021: Adelphi (assistant AD)

Head coaching record
- Overall: 66–55 (.545) (NCAA D-I); 83–37 (.692) (NCAA D-II)
- Tournaments: 1–1 (NCAA D-II) 1-1 (Women's NIT)

Melissa Anne Traversi (born January 27, 1983) is an American basketball coach and former player. She is currently the head coach of the Merrimack Warriors women's basketball team. From 2021 to 2025, she was head coach of the Army Black Knights.

== Early life and playing career ==
Traversi grew up in Attleboro, Massachusetts.

She played basketball, swimming, and tennis at Bishop Feehan High School, graduating in 2001.

== Coaching career ==
On March 29, 2021, Traversi was named the eighth women's basketball coach in United States Military Academy history.

After a 25-8 season which included a 14-4 second place finish in the Patriot League, it was announced on May 6, 2025 that Traversi would not be returning as the Black Knights' coach for the 25-26 season.

== Head coaching record ==
=== NCAA Division I & II ===
Record table
Season	Team	Overall	Conference	Standing	Postseason
Adelphi Panthers (Northeast-10) (2016–2021)
2016–17	Adelphi	27–5	18–2	1st (Southwest)	NCAA Regional Semifinals
2017–18	Adelphi	14–16	9–11	4th (Southwest)	
2018–19	Adelphi	15–13	12–8	2nd (Southwest)	
2019–20	Adelphi	27–3	17–2	1st (Southwest)	Postseason cancelled due to the COVID-19 pandemic.
2020–21	Adelphi				Season cancelled due to the COVID-19 pandemic.
Adelphi:		83–37 (.692)	55–23 (.705)		
Army Black Knights (Patriot League) (2021–2025)
2021–22	Army	16–13	10–8	6th	
2022–23	Army	13–17	10–8	T-4th	
2023–24	Army	12–17	9–9	T-5th	
2024–25	Army	25–8	14–4	2nd	WNIT Second Round
Army:		66–55 (.545)	43–29 (.597)		
Merrimack Warriors (Metro) (2026–present)
2026–27	Merrimack	0–0	0–0		
Merrimack:		0–0 (–)	0–0 (–)		
Total:		149–92 (.618)			
National champion Postseason invitational champion Conference regular season champion Conference regular season and conference tournament champion Division regular season champion Division regular season and conference tournament champion Conference tournament champion
