= Megan Gebbia =

American basketball coach (born 1973)

Current position
- Title: Head coach
- Team: Wake Forest
- Conference: ACC
- Record: 47–80 (.370)

Biographical details
- Born: March 7, 1973 (age 53); Frederick, Maryland, U.S.

Playing career
- 1990–1994: Towson

Coaching career (HC unless noted)
- 1995–1996: American (assistant)
- 1996–2002: UMBC (assistant)
- 2002–2003: Wright State (assistant)
- 2003–2013: Marist (Assoc. HC)
- 2013–2022: American
- 2022–present: Wake Forest

Head coaching record
- Overall: 207–186 (.527)

Megan Gebbia (/ˈdʒɛbiːə/ JEB-ee-ə; born March 7, 1973) is currently the head coach of the Wake Forest University women's basketball team, replacing Jen Hoover on May 26, 2022.

== Career ==
She had previously served in a similar capacity at American University for nine seasons from 2013 to 2022. A two-time Patriot League Coach of the Year in 2015 and 2018, she was the program's all-time wins leader with a 160–106 record who also led the Eagles to three NCAA Division I women's basketball tournament bids in 2015, 2018 and 2022. She was succeeded by Tiffany Coll twelve days later on June 7.

Prior to American, she spent 10 years at Marist College, including the last seven as associate head coach. She had joined the Red Foxes women's basketball coaching staff on June 4, 2003. She was an assistant coach with American in 1995–96, followed by six years at UMBC from 1996 to 2002 and Wright State in 2002–03.

A 1990 graduate of Middletown High School, she earned a Bachelor of Science in Psychology from Towson State University in 1994.

== Career statistics ==
=== College ===
Year	Team	GP	GS	MPG	FG%	3P%	FT%	RPG	APG	SPG	BPG	TO	PPG
1990–91	Towson	27	-	-	33.6	21.4	92.9	2.1	1.1	0.8	0.1	-	3.4
1991–92	Towson	27	-	-	28.3	20.0	70.0	1.3	1.1	0.6	0.1	-	2.6
1992–93	Towson	28	-	-	37.8	25.0	85.7	3.2	2.5	1.8	0.4	-	8.5
1993–94	Towson	24	-	-	42.9	38.7	80.0	5.5	4.3	2.0	0.5	-	12.1
Career		106	-	-	37.6	31.9	82.1	3.0	2.2	1.3	0.3	-	6.5
Statistics retrieved from Sports-Reference.

== Head coaching record ==
Record table
Season	Team	Overall	Conference	Standing	Postseason
American Eagles (Patriot League) (2013–2022)
2013–14	American	22–10	14–4	3rd	WNIT first round
2014–15	American	24–9	16–2	1st	NCAA first round
2015–16	American	8–23	5–13	7th	
2016–17	American	15–16	11–7	4th	
2017–18	American	26–7	16–2	1st	NCAA First Round
2018–19	American	22–11	16–2	2nd	WNIT first round
2019–20	American	13–17	8–10	7th	
2020–21	American	7–4	7–4	3rd	
2021–22	American	23–9	13–5	2nd	NCAA First Round
American:		160–106 (.602)	106–49 (.684)		
Wake Forest Demon Deacons (ACC) (2022–present)
2022–23	Wake Forest	17–17	5–13	T–11th	WNIT Second Round
2023–24	Wake Forest	7–25	2–16	T–14th	
2024–25	Wake Forest	9–20	2–16	T–17th	
2025–26	Wake Forest	14–18	4–14	15th	WNIT First Round
Wake Forest:		47–80 (.370)	13–59 (.181)		
Total:		207–186 (.527)			
National champion Postseason invitational champion Conference regular season champion Conference regular season and conference tournament champion Division regular season champion Division regular season and conference tournament champion Conference tournament champion
