= 2020–21 American Eagles women's basketball team =

Intercollegiate basketball season

2020–21 American Eagles women's basketball
- Conference: Patriot League
- Record: 0–0 (0–0 Patriot)
- Head coach: Megan Gebbia (8th season)
- Assistant coaches: Tiffany Coll; Nikki Flores; Emily Stallings
- Home arena: Bender Arena

2020–21 Patriot League women's basketball standings
	Conf.				Overall
Team	W		L	PCT	W		L	PCT
North
Boston University	11	–	2	.846	12	–	3	.800
Holy Cross	7	–	7	.500	7	–	8	.467
Army	6	–	8	.429	9	–	11	.450
Colgate	1	–	8	.111	1	–	8	.111
Central
Bucknell	8	–	1	.889	9	–	1	.900
Lehigh†	8	–	5	.615	10	–	6	.625
Lafayette	5	–	7	.417	5	–	8	.385
South
American	7	–	4	.636	8	–	4	.667
Navy	5	–	4	.556	5	–	8	.385
Loyola (MD)	0	–	12	.000	0	–	13	.000
† 2021 Patriot League tournament winner Colgate suspended their season on February 18, 2021; As of July 7, 2024; Rankings from AP poll

The 2020–21 American Eagles women's basketball team represented the American University Eagles during the 2020–21 NCAA Division I women's basketball season. The Eagles were by eighth-year head coach Megan Gebbia and played their home games at Bender Arena as members of the Patriot League.

== Previous season ==
They finished the previous season 13–17, 8–10 in Patriot League play to finish in fifth place. They advanced to the Quarterfinals of the Patriot League tournament before losing to Boston University. The tournament was cancelled after the Quarterfinals due to the COVID-19 pandemic. The NCAA tournament and NIT were also cancelled due to the pandemic.

== Roster ==
2020–21 American Eagles women's basketball team
Players
Coaches

Pos.	#	Name	Height	Year	Previous school	Hometown
G	2	Ivy Bales	5 ft 10 in (1.78 m)	Fr	Gatlinburg-Pittman HS	Gatlinburg, TN
G	4	Emily Fisher	5 ft 7 in (1.7 m)	Jr	Emmaus College	Melbourne, Australia
G	5	Sadie Stetson	5 ft 7 in (1.7 m)	So	St. Johnsbury Academy	Waterford, VT
G	10	Jade Edwards	5 ft 10 in (1.78 m)	Jr	The Latin School of Chicago	Chicago, IL
F	11	Taekenya Cleveland	6 ft 0 in (1.83 m)	Sr	Regis Jesuit HS	Aurora, CO
G	12	Indeya Sanders	5 ft 6 in (1.68 m)	Sr	Herndon HS	Reston, VA
G	13	Kayla Henning	5 ft 7 in (1.7 m)	Fr	Evanston Township HS	Evanston, IL
F	14	Taylor Brown	6 ft 1 in (1.85 m)	Jr	Lakeville North HS	Lakeville, MN
F	15	Karla Vres	6 ft 3 in (1.91 m)	So	JENSEN gymnasium Södra (Sweden)	Zagreb, Croatia
G	21	Maddie Doring	5 ft 11 in (1.8 m)	Jr	St. John Vianney HS	Sayreville, NJ
F	22	Keagan Schwab	—	Fr	South County HS	Fairfax Station, VA
F	23	Lauren Stack	6 ft 2 in (1.88 m)	So	Benet Academy	St. Charles, IL
G	24	Laura Graytok	5 ft 8 in (1.73 m)	Jr	Greater Latrobe Senior HS	Latrobe, PA
F	32	Thuraya Abdul Hamid	5 ft 10 in (1.78 m)	So	Blair Academy	Amman, Jordan
F	44	Emily Johns	6 ft 1 in (1.85 m)	Fr	Washington Township HS	Washington Township, NJ

Head coach

- Megan Gebbia (Towson)

Assistant coach(es)

- Tiffany Coll (UMBC)
- Nikki Flores (Marist)
- Emily Stallings (Marist)

Legend

- (C) Team captain
- (S) Suspended
- (I) Ineligible
- (W) Walk-on
- Injured
- Current redshirt

Roster
Last update: November 28, 2020

== Schedule ==
Date time, TV	Rank^{#}	Opponent^{#}	Result	Record	High points	High rebounds	High assists	Site (attendance) city, state
Non-conference regular season
Patriot League regular season
January 2, 2021		Loyola (MD)						Bender Arena; Washington, D.C.
January 3, 2021		at Loyola (MD)						Reitz Arena; Baltimore, MD
January 9, 2021		Lehigh						Bender Arena; Washington, D.C.
January 10, 2021		at Lehigh						Stabler Arena; Bethlehem, PA
January 16, 2021		Navy						Bender Arena; Washington, D.C.
January 17, 2021		at Navy						Alumni Hall; Annapolis, MD
January 23, 2021		at Loyola (MD)						Reitz Arena; Baltimore, MD
January 24, 2021		Loyola (MD)						Bender Arena; Washington, D.C.
January 30, 2021		at Lafayette						Kirby Sports Center; Easton, PA
January 31, 2021		Lafayette						Bender Arena; Washington, D.C.
February 6, 2021		at Navy						Alumni Hall; Annapolis, MD
February 7, 2021		Navy						Bender Arena; Washington, D.C.
February 13, 2021		Bucknell						Bender Arena; Washington, D.C.
February 14, 2021		at Bucknell						Sojka Pavilion; Lewisburg, PA
February 20, 2021		at Loyola (MD)						Reitz Arena; Annapolis, MD
February 21, 2021		Loyola (MD)						Bender Arena; Washington, D.C.
Patriot League tournament
		vs.			– –			
*Non-conference game. ^{#}Rankings from AP Poll. (#) Tournament seedings in parentheses. All times are in Eastern Time.

== See also ==
- 2020–21 American Eagles men's basketball team
