= 1986–87 St. Francis Terriers men's basketball team =

American college basketball season

1986–87 St. Francis Terriers men's basketball
- Conference: ECAC Metro
- Record: 11–16 (5–11 NEC)
- Head coach: Bob Valvano (3rd season)
- Home arena: Generoso Pope Athletic Complex

1986–87 ECAC Metro men's basketball standings
	Conf.				Overall
Team	W		L	PCT	W		L	PCT
Marist †	15	–	1	.938	20	–	10	.667
Fairleigh Dickinson	11	–	5	.688	19	–	10	.655
Loyola (MD)	10	–	6	.625	15	–	14	.517
Wagner	8	–	8	.500	16	–	13	.552
Robert Morris	7	–	9	.438	13	–	14	.481
St. Francis (PA)	7	–	9	.438	11	–	16	.407
Long Island	5	–	11	.313	13	–	14	.481
St. Francis (NY)	5	–	11	.313	11	–	16	.407
Monmouth	4	–	12	.250	8	–	19	.296
† 1987 ECAC Metro tournament winner Rankings from AP Poll

The 1986–87 St. Francis Terriers men's basketball team represented St. Francis College during the 1986–87 NCAA Division I men's basketball season. The team was coached by Bob Valvano, who was in his third year at the helm of the St. Francis Terriers. The Terrier's home games were played at the Generoso Pope Athletic Complex. The team has been a member of the Northeast Conference since 1981, although at this time the conference was known as the ECAC Metro Conference.

The Terriers finished their season at 11–16 overall and 5–11 in conference play. They did not qualify for the NEC Tournament.

== Roster ==
1986–87 St. Francis Brooklyn Terriers men's basketball team
Players
Coaches

Pos.	#	Name	Height	Weight	Year	Hometown
C		Barry Leskun	6 ft 8 in (2.03 m)	—	Sr
F		Donald Pugh	6 ft 4 in (1.93 m)	—	Sr
F		Dickens Benoit	6 ft 4 in (1.93 m)	—	Sr
C		Magdi Ahamed	6 ft 7 in (2.01 m)	—	Jr
F		Darwin Purdie	6 ft 6 in (1.98 m)	—	So	Wilmington, Delaware
G		Rodney Henry	6 ft 0 in (1.83 m)	—	So
G		Juan Jorge	6 ft 4 in (1.93 m)	—	So
G		Chris Palermo	6 ft 1 in (1.85 m)	—	So
G		John Flannigan	5 ft 11 in (1.8 m)	—	Fr
C		Stefan Jensen	6 ft 9 in (2.06 m)	—	Fr
F		Vishnue Naraine	6 ft 5 in (1.96 m)	—	Fr
G		Bob Dentel	6 ft 0 in (1.83 m)	—	Fr

Head coach

- Bob Valvano (Virginia Wesleyan '79)

Assistant coach(es)

Legend

- (C) Team captain
- (S) Suspended
- (I) Ineligible
- (W) Walk-on
- Injured
- Current redshirt

== Schedule and results ==
Date time, TV	Opponent	Result	Record	Site (attendance) city, state
Regular Season
November, 1986*	Morgan State	L 58–61	0–1	Generoso Pope Athletic Complex (1,029); Brooklyn, NY
December 1, 1986*	Manhattan	L 59–73	0–2	Generoso Pope Athletic Complex (1,000); Brooklyn, NY
December 3, 1986*	at Rider	W 68–59	1–2	Alumni Gymnasium (310); Lawrenceville, NJ
December 5, 1986*	at Coastal Carolina; Coastal Carolina Tournament	L 49–61	1–3	Kimbel Arena (750); Conway, SC
December 6, 1986	vs. Long Island; Coastal Carolina Tournament	L 53–73	1–4 (0–1)	Kimbel Arena (400); Conway, SC
December 10, 1986	Fairleigh Dickinson	L 55–68	1–5 (0–2)	Generoso Pope Athletic Complex (750); Brooklyn, NY
December __, 1986*	Baruch	W 59–42	2–5	Generoso Pope Athletic Complex (1,250); Brooklyn, NY
January 3, 1987	Long Island; Battle of Brooklyn	W 94–91 ^{OT}	3–5 (1–2)	Generoso Pope Athletic Complex (1,500); Brooklyn, NY
January 7, 1987	Marist	W 54–53	4–5 (2–2)	Generoso Pope Athletic Complex (1,050); Brooklyn, NY
January, 1987*	Hunter	W 95–62	5–5	Generoso Pope Athletic Complex (750); Brooklyn, NY
January 13, 1987*	at Bucknell	L 59–78	5–6	Davis Gym (1,465); Lewisburg, PA
January 15, 1987	at Saint Francis (PA)	L 60–72	5–7 (2–3)	Maurice Stokes Athletic Center (800); Loretto, PA
January 17, 1987	at Robert Morris	L 34–48	5–8 (2–4)	Charles L. Sewall Center (750); Moon Township, PA
January 21, 1987	at Fairleigh Dickinson	L 66–86	5–9 (2–5)	(300); Rutherford, NJ
January 24, 1987	Wagner	L 64–66	5–10 (2–6)	Generoso Pope Athletic Complex (850); Brooklyn, NY
January 26, 1987	at Loyola (MD)	L 80–95	5–11 (2–7)	Reitz Arena (708); Baltimore, MD
January 29, 1987	Monmouth	W 61–55	6–11 (3–7)	Generoso Pope Athletic Complex (500); Brooklyn, NY
January 31, 1987	at Long Island	L 67–73	6–12 (3–8)	Schwartz Athletic Center (900); Brooklyn, NY
February __, 1987*	Pace	W 66–59	7–12	Generoso Pope Athletic Complex (750); Brooklyn, NY
February __, 1987*	York	W 77–59	8–12	Generoso Pope Athletic Complex (500); Brooklyn, NY
February 11, 1987	at Marist	L 53–64	8–13 (3–9)	McCann Arena (2,819); Poughkeepsie, NY
February 16, 1987	at Loyola (MD)	L 80–95	8–14 (3–10)	Reitz Arena (708); Baltimore, MD
February 19, 1987	Saint Francis (PA)	W 76–67	9–14 (4–10)	Generoso Pope Athletic Complex (2,004); Brooklyn, NY
February 21, 1987	Robert Morris	L 55–57	9–15 (4–11)	Generoso Pope Athletic Complex (350); Brooklyn, NY
February 23, 1987	at Monmouth	W 67–66	10–15 (5–11)	William T. Boylan Gymnasium (250); West Long Branch, NJ
February 26, 1987*	Central Connecticut	W 87–82	11–15	Generoso Pope Athletic Complex (500); Brooklyn, NY
February 28, 1987	at Wagner	L 66–74	11–16	Sutter Gymnasium (2,150); Staten Island, NY
*Non-conference game. ^{#}Rankings from AP Poll. (#) Tournament seedings in parentheses. All times are in Eastern Time.
