= 1987 ECAC Metro men's basketball tournament =

- Classification: Division I
- Season: 1986–87
- Teams: 6
- Site: Campus sites
- Finals site: McCann Field House; Poughkeepsie, NY
- Champions: Marist (2nd title)
- Winning coach: Dave Magarity (1st title)
- MVP: Drafton Davis (Marist)
- ECAC Metro men's basketball tournaments

1986–87 ECAC Metro men's basketball standings
| | Conf. | | | | Overall |
| Team | W | | L | PCT | W | | L | PCT |
|---|---|---|---|---|---|---|---|---|
| Marist † | 15 | – | 1 | .938 | 20 | – | 10 | .667 |
| Fairleigh Dickinson | 11 | – | 5 | .688 | 19 | – | 10 | .655 |
| Loyola (MD) | 10 | – | 6 | .625 | 15 | – | 14 | .517 |
| Wagner | 8 | – | 8 | .500 | 16 | – | 13 | .552 |
| Robert Morris | 7 | – | 9 | .438 | 13 | – | 14 | .481 |
| St. Francis (PA) | 7 | – | 9 | .438 | 11 | – | 16 | .407 |
| Long Island | 5 | – | 11 | .313 | 13 | – | 14 | .481 |
| St. Francis (NY) | 5 | – | 11 | .313 | 11 | – | 16 | .407 |
| Monmouth | 4 | – | 12 | .250 | 8 | – | 19 | .296 |
† 1987 ECAC Metro tournament winner Rankings from AP Poll

The 1987 ECAC Metro men's basketball tournament (now known as the Northeast Conference men's basketball tournament) was held March 3–5. The quarterfinal and semifinal rounds were played on campus sites with the championship game held at McCann Field House in Poughkeepsie, New York.

Marist defeated Fairleigh Dickinson in the championship game, 64–55 in overtime, to win the school's second ECAC Metro men's basketball tournament title. The Red Foxes earned the automatic bid to the 1987 NCAA Tournament.

== Bracket ==
Quarterfinals; Sunday, March 3
4 | Wagner | 82
5 | Robert Morris | 72
3 | Loyola (MD) | 77
6 | St. Francis (PA) | 69

Semifinals; Tuesday, March 4
1 | Marist | 59
4 | Wagner | 57
3 | Loyola (MD) | 50
2 | Fairleigh Dickinson | 75

Championship; Wednesday, March 5
1 | Marist | 64*
2 | Fairleigh Dickinson | 55
