= 1998 Women's National Invitation Tournament =

College basketball postseason tournament

- Teams: 16
- Finals site: Ferrell Center, Waco, TX
- Champions: Penn State (1st title)
- Runner-up: Baylor (1st title game)
- Semifinalists: LSU (3rd semifinal); Indiana (2nd semifinal)
- Winning coach: Rene Portland (1st title)
- MVP: Helen Darling (Penn State)
- Attendance: 10,057 (championship)

The 1998 Women's National Invitation Tournament was a single-elimination tournament of 16 NCAA Division I teams that were not selected to participate in the 1998 Women's NCAA tournament. It was the first edition of the postseason Women's National Invitation Tournament (WNIT).

The final four of the tournament paired Penn State against Indiana and Baylor against LSU. It was Penn State and Indiana's third meeting of the year, Penn State won the rubber match 70–42 while Baylor beat LSU 66–61.

== Bracket ==
Visiting teams in first round are listed first. Games marked signify overtime. Source

=== Regional bracket ===
First Round; March 13
Villanova	61
Penn State	68
American	68
Saint Joseph's	77
Cincinnati	62
Toledo	76
Xavier	74
Indiana	80

Second Round; March 15
at Penn State	72
Saint Joseph's	59
at Toledo	60
Indiana	61

Quarterfinals; March 20
at Penn State	70
Indiana	42

=== Regional bracket ===
First Round; March 13 & 15
Boise State	38
LSU	58
Butler	95
Bowling Green	90
Oklahoma State	75
Rice	52
Mississippi State	65
Baylor	75

Second Round; March 15 & 17
at LSU	74
Butler	58
Oklahoma State	47
at Baylor	54

Quarterfinals; March 20
LSU	61
at Baylor	66

=== Championship ===
Championship; March 24
Penn State	59
at Baylor	56

=== WNIT All-Tournament Team ===
- Helen Darling - Penn State (MVP)
- LaToya Ellis - Baylor

== See also ==
- 1998 National Invitation Tournament
