= Dave Magarity =

American basketball coach

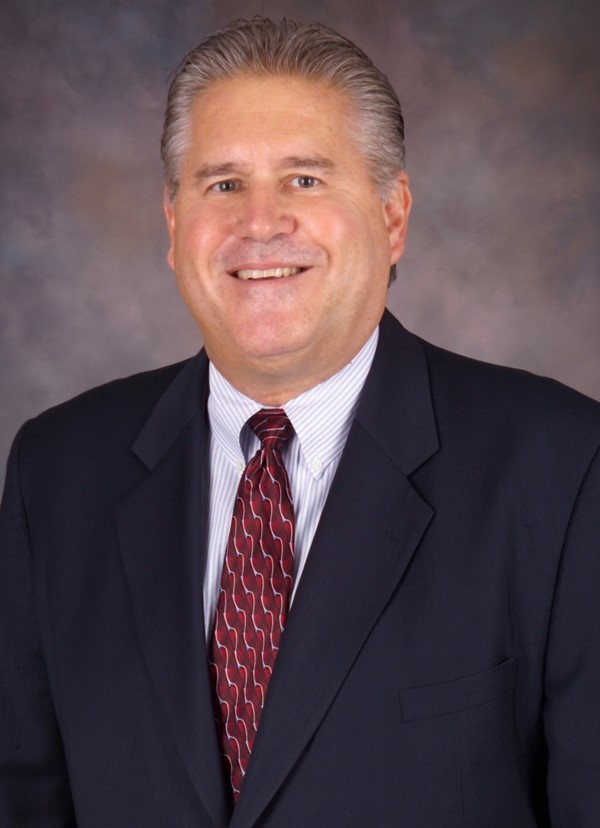
- Magarity in 2009

Biographical details
- Born: January 26, 1950 (age 76); Philadelphia, Pennsylvania, U.S.

Playing career
- 1968–1972: Saint Francis (PA)

Coaching career (HC unless noted)
- 1974–1978: Saint Francis (PA) (asst.)
- 1978–1983: Saint Francis (PA)
- 1983–1986: Iona (asst.)
- 1986–2004: Marist
- 2005–2006: Army (women's asst.)
- 2006–2021: Army (women's)

Head coaching record
- Overall: 313–335 (.483) (men's); 266–183 (.592) (women's)

Accomplishments and honors

Championships
- 2 NEC regular season (1987, 1988) NEC tournament champion (1987); MAAC Regular Season Champion (2002); 2x Patriot League Women’s Regular Season Champion (2013, 2016) 2x Patriot League Women’s Tournament Champion (2014, 2016)

Awards
- 2× NEC Coach of the Year (1987, 1995) MAAC Coach of the Year (2001); Patriot League Women's Coach of the Year (2013); NY Metropolitan Coach of Year (2007, 2016) WBCA East Regional Coach of Year (2016)

David William Magarity (born January 26, 1950) is an American college basketball coach who most recently was the head coach of the Army Black Knights women's basketball team. He previously served as the head men's basketball coach at St. Francis (PA) and Marist.

== Coaching career ==
Magarity landed his first coaching job at his alma mater as an assistant coach in 1974, and was elevated to head coach at St. Francis in 1978, where he was 60–76 in five seasons. After a three-year stop at Iona as an assistant under Pat Kennedy and participated in the 1984 and 1985 NCAA Division I Men's Basketball Tournament. Magarity accepted the head coaching position at Marist in 1986, where he stayed for 18 seasons, amassing a 253–259 record while guiding the Red Foxes to the 1987 NCAA tournament with Rik Smits, as well as a National Invitational Tournament appearance in 1996. He won two ECAC Metro conference regular season titles, a tournament title, and one MAAC regular season title.

Magarity stepped down from Marist after the 2004 season, and became an administrator for two seasons at both the MAAC and Mid-American Conference before joining Maggie Dixon's staff at Army as a women's basketball Associate Head coach. After Dixon's sudden death in 2006, Magarity was elevated to the position of head coach of the Black Knights. He coached there for 16 seasons until his retirement in 2021.

== Personal life ==
Magarity's daughter Maureen is a former assistant of his at Army, and was the head coach at New Hampshire for 10 years before accepting the head coaching position at Holy Cross, like Army a member of the Patriot League. His son David played basketball at Marist. He has several other family members who played basketball at NCAA Division I schools—sisters Anne and Rosemary respectively at La Salle and Villanova, brother Bill at Georgia, and Bill's daughter Regan at Virginia Tech.

The January 9, 2021 game between Army and Holy Cross was the first time that a father and daughter coached against one another in Division I basketball.

== Head coaching record ==
=== Men ===
Record table
Season	Team	Overall	Conference	Standing	Postseason
Saint Francis Red Flash (NCAA Division I independent) (1978–1981)
1978–79	Saint Francis (PA)	13–13			
1979–80	Saint Francis (PA)	12–16			
1980–81	Saint Francis (PA)	17–10			
Saint Francis Red Flash (Eastern Collegiate Athletic Conference South) (1981–1984)
1981–82	Saint Francis (PA)	6–20	3–11	5th (South)	
1982–83	Saint Francis (PA)	12–17	7–7	2nd (South)	
Saint Francis (PA):		60–76 (.441)	10–18 (.357)		
Marist Red Foxes (Eastern Collegiate Athletic Conference Metro/Northeast Conference) (1986–1997)
1986–87	Marist	20–10	15–1	1st	NCAA first round
1987–88	Marist	18–9	13–3	T–1st	
1988–89	Marist	13–15	9–7	4th	
1989–90	Marist	17–11	10–6	3rd	
1990–91	Marist	6–22	4–12	8th	
1991–92	Marist	13–16	6–10	7th	
1992–93	Marist	14–16	10–8	4th	
1993–94	Marist	14–13	10–8	6th	
1994–95	Marist	17–13	12–6	3rd	
1995–96	Marist	22–7	14–4	2nd	
1996–97	Marist	6–22	4–14	9th	
Marist Red Foxes (Metro Atlantic Athletic Conference) (1997–2004)
1997–98	Marist	11–17	7–11	8th	
1998–99	Marist	16–12	8–10	6th	
1999–00	Marist	14–14	10–8	4th	
2000–01	Marist	17–13	11–7	4th	
2001–02	Marist	19–9	13–5	T–1st	
2002–03	Marist	13–16	8–10	6th	
2003–04	Marist	6–22	4–14	9th	
Marist:		253–259 (.494)	168–144 (.538)		
Total:		313–335 (.483)			
National champion Postseason invitational champion Conference regular season champion Conference regular season and conference tournament champion Division regular season champion Division regular season and conference tournament champion Conference tournament champion

=== Women ===
Record table
Season	Team	Overall	Conference	Standing	Postseason
Army Black Knights (Patriot League) (2006–2021)
2006–07	Army	24–6	11–3	2nd	
2007–08	Army	18–12	9–5	4th	
2008–09	Army	19–12	8–6	5th	
2009–10	Army	11–17	5–9	4th	
2010–11	Army	13–16	7–7	5th	
2011–12	Army	14–16	8–6	4th	
2012–13	Army	22–9	11–3	1st	WNIT First Round
2013–14	Army	25–8	14–4	2nd	NCAA Tournament first round
2014–15	Army	23–8	14–4	2nd	WNIT First Round
2015–16	Army	29–3	17–1	1st	NCAA Tournament first round
2016–17	Army	22–9	12–6	3rd	
2017–18	Army	17–14	9–9	4th	
2018–19	Army	11–19	6–12	7th	
2019–20	Army	8–20	4–13	9th	
2020–21	Army	9–11	6–8	3rd	
Army:		266–183 (.592)	141–96 (.595)		
Total:		266–183 (.592)			
National champion Postseason invitational champion Conference regular season champion Conference regular season and conference tournament champion Division regular season champion Division regular season and conference tournament champion Conference tournament champion
