= 2021 Patriot League women's basketball tournament =

2021 women's basketball championship tournament for the NCAA Division I Patriot League

- Classification: Division I
- Season: 2020–21
- Teams: 8
- Site: Campus sites
- Champions: Lehigh (4th title)
- Winning coach: Sue Troyan (4th title)
- Television: ESPN+, CBS Sports Network

2020–21 Patriot League women's basketball standings
	Conf.				Overall
Team	W		L	PCT	W		L	PCT
North
Boston University	11	–	2	.846	12	–	3	.800
Holy Cross	7	–	7	.500	7	–	8	.467
Army	6	–	8	.429	9	–	11	.450
Colgate	1	–	8	.111	1	–	8	.111
Central
Bucknell	8	–	1	.889	9	–	1	.900
Lehigh†	8	–	5	.615	10	–	6	.625
Lafayette	5	–	7	.417	5	–	8	.385
South
American	7	–	4	.636	8	–	4	.667
Navy	5	–	4	.556	5	–	8	.385
Loyola (MD)	0	–	12	.000	0	–	13	.000
† 2021 Patriot League tournament winner Colgate suspended their season on February 18, 2021; As of July 7, 2024; Rankings from AP poll

The 2021 Patriot League women's basketball tournament (officially known as the 2021 PenFed Credit Union Patriot League Women's Basketball Championship due to sponsorship reasons) was the postseason women's basketball tournament for the 2020–21 season in the Patriot League. The tournament was held March 7–14, 2021. The tournament winner received an automatic invitation to the 2021 NCAA Division I women's basketball tournament. Lehigh won the conference tournament championship game over Boston University, 64–54.

== Seeds ==
Seed	School	Conference	Tiebreaker 1
1	Bucknell	8–1	
2	Boston University	11–2	
3	American	7–4	
4	Lehigh	8–5	
5	Holy Cross	7–7	
6	Army	6–8	
7	Lafayette	5–7	
8	Loyola (MD)	0–12	

== Schedule ==
Game	Time*	Matchup^{#}	Score	Television
Quarterfinals – Sunday, March 7, 2021
1	2:00 p.m.	No. 7 Lafayette at No. 2 Boston University	50-65	ESPN+
2	2:00 p.m.	No. 5 Holy Cross No. 4 Lehigh	68-74	ESPN+
3	4:00 p.m.	No. 8 Loyola (MD) at No. 1 Bucknell	56-76	ESPN+
4	4:00 p.m.	No. 6 Army at No. 3 American	57-75	ESPN+
Semifinals – Thursday, March 11, 2021
5	7:00 p.m.	No. 4 Lehigh at No. 1 Bucknell	63-54	ESPN+
6	6:00 p.m.	No. 3 American at No. 2 Boston University	51-72	ESPN+
Championship – Sunday, March 14, 2021
7	4:00 p.m.	No. 4 Lehigh at No. 2 Boston University	64-54	CBS Sports Network
*All times Eastern. ^{#}Rankings denote tournament seeding.

== Bracket ==
Quarterfinals; Sunday, March 7 ESPN+
1	Bucknell	65
8	Loyola (MD)	50
4	Lehigh	75
5	Holy Cross	57
3	American	76
6	Army	56
2	Boston University	74
7	Lafayette	68

Semifinals; Thursday, March 11; ESPN+
1	Bucknell	54
4	Lehigh	63
3	American	51
2	Boston University	72

Championship; Sunday, March 14; CBS Sports Network, 4:00 pm
4	Lehigh	64
2	Boston University	54

== See also ==
- 2021 Patriot League men's basketball tournament
- Patriot League women's basketball tournament
