= American Eagles women's basketball =

| 2026–27 American Eagles women's basketball team |
- University: American University
- Head coach: Kelly Killion (1st season)
- Location: Washington, D.C.
- Arena: Bender Arena (capacity: 4,500)
- Conference: Patriot
- Nickname: Eagles
- Colors: Blue, white, and red

NCAA Division I tournament appearances
- 2015, 2018, 2022

Conference tournament champions
- 2015, 2018, 2022

Conference regular-season champions
- 2018

American Eagles women's basketball team represents American University and plays its home games at Bender Arena in Washington D.C. It competes as part of the Patriot League in NCAA Division I. In 2015, it received its first ever bid in the NCAA Division I women's basketball tournament as a 14 seed after a 28–4 record and their first ever Patriot League tournament championship. They lost to #3 Iowa 75–67 in the First Round.

== Current staff ==
| Position | Name | Year | Alma mater |
|---|---|---|---|
| Head coach | Kelly Killion | 2008 | Holy Family University |
| Assistant Coach | Niya Beverly | 2021 | Penn State |
| Assistant Coach | Michelle Holmes | 2016 | American |
| Assistant Coach | Claire Mattox | 2014 | Washington |
| Director of Basketball Ops | Nicole Krusen | 2016 | Loyola University Maryland |

== Year-by-year records ==
- American
- Patriot

Record table
| Season | Coach | Overall | Conference | Standing | Postseason |
|---|---|---|---|---|---|
Joanne Benton (1966–1969)
| 1966–67 | Joanne Benton | 1–3 | | | |
| 1967–68 | Joanne Benton | 0–1 | | | |
| 1968–69 | Joanne Benton | 3–1 | | | |
| Joanne Benton: | | 4–5 (.444) | | | |
Pat Hurst (1969–1970)
| 1969–70 | Pat Hurst | 0–9 | | | |
| Pat Hurst: | | 0–9 (.000) | | | |
Diane Headlee (1970–1972)
| 1970–71 | Diane Headlee | 1–10 | | | |
| 1971–72 | Diane Headlee | 6–5 | | | |
| Diane Headlee: | | 7–15 (.318) | | | |
Janet Sadowski (1974–1976)
| 1974–75 | Janet Sadowski | 7–4 | | | |
| 1975–76 | Janet Sadowski | 11–4 | | | |
| Janet Sadowski: | | 18–8 (.692) | | | |
Bessie Stockard (1976–1978)
| 1976–77 | Bessie Stockard | 1–2 | | | |
| 1977–78 | Bessie Stockard | 4–1 | | | |
| Bessie Stockard: | | 5–3 (.625) | | | |
Linda Ziemke (1978–1988)
| 1978–79 | Linda Ziemke | 6–8 | | | |
| 1979–80 | Linda Ziemke | 6–13 | | | |
| 1980–81 | Linda Ziemke | 10–13 | | | |
| 1981–82 | Linda Ziemke | 13–12 | | | |
| 1982–83 | Linda Ziemke | 10–10 | | | |
| 1983–84 | Linda Ziemke | 10–18 | | | |
| 1983–84 | Linda Ziemke | 10–18 | | | |
Patriot League (1984–present)
| 1984–85 | Linda Ziemke | 12–14 | 3–9 | 6th | |
| 1985–86 | Linda Ziemke | 20–7 | 8–4 | 3rd | |
| 1986–87 | Linda Ziemke | 20–8 | 7–5 | T-2nd | |
| 1987–88 | Linda Ziemke | 13–15 | 6–6 | 4th | |
| Linda Ziemke: | | 130–136 (.489) | 24–24 (.500) | | |
Darci Wilson (Patriot League) (1988–1989)
| 1988–89 | Darci Wilson | 5–23 | 3–9 | T-5th | |
| Darci Wilson: | | 5–23 (.179) | 3–9 (.250) | | |
Jeff Thatcher (Patriot League) (1989–2000)
| 1989–90 | Jeff Thatcher | 9–19 | 3–9 | 6th | |
| 1990–91 | Jeff Thatcher | 9–19 | 1–11 | 7th | |
| 1991–92 | Jeff Thatcher | 16–12 | 6–8 | 6th | |
| 1992–93 | Jeff Thatcher | 15–13 | 7–7 | T-3rd | |
| 1993–94 | Jeff Thatcher | 8–19 | 3–11 | 6th | |
| 1994–95 | Jeff Thatcher | 13–14 | 7–7 | T-3rd | |
| 1995–96 | Jeff Thatcher | 12–16 | 9–7 | 4th | |
| 1996–97 | Jeff Thatcher | 18–9 | 11–5 | 2nd | |
| 1997–98 | Jeff Thatcher | 23–7 | 11–5 | 2nd | WNIT 1st Round |
| 1998–99 | Jeff Thatcher | 11–16 | 4–12 | T-8th | |
| 1999–2000 | Jeff Thatcher | 12–16 | 5–11 | T-7th | |
| Jeff Thatcher: | | 146–160 (.447) | 67–93 (.419) | | |
Shann Hart (Patriot League) (2000–2004)
| 2000–01 | Shann Hart | 4–23 | 2–14 | 8th | |
| 2001–02 | Shann Hart | 12–14 | 7–7 | T-4th | |
| 2002–03 | Shann Hart | 18–11 | 10–4 | 2nd | |
| 2003–04 | Shann Hart | 16–14 | 9–5 | T-2nd | |
| Shann Hart: | | 50–52 (.490) | 28–30 (.490) | | |
Melissa McFerrin (Patriot League) (2004–2008)
| 2004–05 | Melissa McFerrin | 12–16 | 7–7 | 4th | |
| 2005–06 | Melissa McFerrin | 7–21 | 4–10 | 7th | |
| 2006–07 | Melissa McFerrin | 13–19 | 6–8 | T-4th | |
| 2007–08 | Melissa McFerrin | 18–13 | 11–3 | 1st | WNIT First Round |
| Melissa McFerrin: | | 50–69 (.420) | | | |
Matt Corkery (Patriot League) (2008–2013)
| 2008–09 | Matt Corkery | 19–12 | 9–5 | 2nd | |
| 2009–10 | Matt Corkery | 22–10 | 13–1 | T-1st | WNIT First Round |
| 2010–11 | Matt Corkery | 22–9 | 10–4 | T-1st | |
| 2011–12 | Matt Corkery | 23–8 | 14–0 | 1st | WNIT First Round |
| 2012–13 | Matt Corkery | 15–14 | 8–6 | T-3rd | |
| Matt Corkery: | | 101–53 (.656) | 54–16 (.771) | | |
Megan Gebbia (Patriot League) (2013–2022)
| 2013–14 | Megan Gebbia | 22–10 | 14–4 | T-2nd | WNIT First Round |
| 2014–15 | Megan Gebbia | 24–9 | 16–2 | 1st | NCAA first round |
| 2015–16 | Megan Gebbia | 8–23 | 5–13 | 7th | |
| 2016–17 | Megan Gebbia | 15–16 | 11–7 | T-4th | |
| 2017–18 | Megan Gebbia | 26–7 | 16–2 | 1st | NCAA first round |
| 2018–19 | Megan Gebbia | 22–11 | 16–2 | 2nd | WNIT First Round |
| 2019–20 | Megan Gebbia | 13–17 | 8–10 | 7th | |
| 2020–21 | Megan Gebbia | 7–4 | 7–4 | 3rd | |
| 2021–22 | Megan Gebbia | 23–8 | 13–5 | 2nd | NCAA first round |
| Megan Gebbia: | | 160–105 (.604) | 106–49 (.684) | | |
Tiffany Coll (Patriot League) (2022–2025)
| 2022–23 | Tiffany Coll | 9–22 | 7–11 | T–7th | |
| Tiffany Coll: | | 9–22 (.290) | 7–11 (.389) | | |
| Total: | | 685–660 (.509) | | | |
National champion Postseason invitational champion Conference regular season champion Conference regular season and conference tournament champion Division regular season champion Division regular season and conference tournament champion Conference tournament champion

Ref

== NCAA Tournament appearances ==
The Eagles are 0–3 in NCAA Tournament appearances.

| Year | Seed | Round | Opponent | Result |
|---|---|---|---|---|
| 2015 | 14 | First Round | (3) Iowa | L 67–75 |
| 2018 | 14 | First Round | (3) UCLA | L 60–71 |
| 2022 | 14 | First Round | (3) Michigan | L 39–74 |

== WNIT ==
The Eagles have made seven appearances in the Women's National Invitation Tournament. They have a combined record of 0–7.

| Year | Round | Opponent | Result |
|---|---|---|---|
| 1998 | First Round | Saint Joseph's | L 68–77 |
| 2008 | First Round | Villanova | L 52–53 |
| 2009 | First Round | James Madison | L 59–61 |
| 2010 | First Round | Old Dominion | L 55–63 |
| 2012 | First Round | Villanova | L 39–58 |
| 2014 | First Round | Seton Hall | L 60–63 |
| 2019 | First Round | Penn | L 45–64 |

== Stafford H. Cassell Hall of Fame ==
The Stafford H. Cassell Hall of Fame was introduced celebrate the rich history of American University Athletics. The following are some former members of the women's basketball team to be introduced into the Hall of Fame.

=== Inductees ===
| Player | Tenure | Inducted | Description |
|---|---|---|---|
| Jackie Frazier-Lyde | 1979—1983 | 2005 | One of AU's top all-time scorers, Jacqui Frazier-Lyde was the first female basketball player to reach the 1,000-point milestone at American University. Scored 1,106 points in her career and was a former boxer is the daughter of former world Heavyweight boxing champion Joe Frazier. |
| Beth Shearer Clark | 1984—1988 | 1999 | Scored a career 1,611 points a feat that now ranks her second amongst all-time leading scorers. She currently ranks 1st in scoring average in a season, averaging 19.1 points per game in her last season as an Eagle, while her 534 points that year are the third-most in program history. She is considered one of the best scorers in AU history. |
| Mary Klima | 1994—1998 | 2010 | Klima was a standout member of American's 1998 WNIT team, and ranks among the most prolific rebounder in university history, Klima leads the all-time list in career re- bounds (881), single-season re-bounds (304) and single-game rebounds (24). |
| Jody Thornton Powell | 1983—1987 | 1999 | One of the great passers in AU women's basketball history was Jody Thornton Powell. In her career from 1983 to 1987, she recorded 693 assists, ranking at the top of the school charts. She also started 102 games over her four-year career. |
| Ethel Smith | 1927—1931 | 1996 | Ethel Smith, a 1931 graduate from AU, was honored in 1977 with a Lifetime Achievement Award from the university for her years of service. From 1943 to 1945, she served as the president of the university's Alumni Association. |
| Darci Smith Wilson | 1980—1984 | 1996 | As a student-athlete, she had success, scoring 1,164 career points to go along with a 14.4 scoring average. Smith Wilson was also a powerhouse on the glass with 569 career rebounds, which ranks tied for 11th all-time. |

== See also ==
- American Eagles men's basketball
