= 2020 Patriot League women's basketball tournament =

- Classification: Division I
- Season: 2019–20
- Teams: 10
- Site: Campus sites
- Television: PLN, CBSSN

2019–20 Patriot League women's basketball standings
	Conf.				Overall
Team	W		L	PCT	W		L	PCT
Bucknell	15	–	2	.882	22	–	6	.786
Colgate	11	–	6	.647	19	–	9	.679
Boston University	11	–	6	.647	16	–	12	.571
Lafayette	11	–	6	.647	15	–	12	.556
Holy Cross	10	–	7	.588	17	–	11	.607
Lehigh	8	–	8	.500	16	–	11	.593
American	7	–	10	.412	11	–	16	.407
Loyola (MD)	5	–	11	.313	8	–	19	.296
Army	4	–	13	.235	8	–	20	.286
Navy	2	–	15	.118	7	–	21	.250
† 2020 Patriot League tournament winner As of March 12, 2025; Rankings from AP poll

The 2020 Patriot League women's basketball tournament was the postseason women's basketball tournament for the Patriot League which was scheduled to be held from March 7 to March 15 at campus sites of the higher seed. The winner would have earned an automatic bid to the NCAA women's tournament. On March 12, the NCAA announced that the tournament was cancelled due to the coronavirus pandemic.

== Seeds ==
Teams are seeded by conference record, with ties broken in the following order:

- Head-to-head record between the teams involved in the tie
- Record against the highest-seeded team not involved in the tie, going down through the seedings as necessary
- Higher RPI entering the tournament, as published by College Basketball News

American, Bucknell, Holy Cross, BU, and Lehigh received first round byes.

Seed	School	Conference	Overall	Tiebreaker
1	Bucknell	16–2	23–6	
2	Boston University	12–6	17–12	
3	Colgate	11–7	19–10	
4	Holy Cross	11–7	18–11	
5	Lafayette	11–7	18–13	
6	Lehigh	10–8	18–11	
7	American	8–10	12–16	
8	Loyola (MD)	5–13	8–21	
9	Army	4–14	8–21	
10	Navy	2–16	7–22	

== Schedule ==
Game	Time*	Matchup	Score	Television
First round – Saturday, March 7
1	2:00 pm	#10 Navy at #7 American	53–63	PLN
2	5:00 pm	#9 Army at #8 Loyola (MD)	72–65	PLN
Quarterfinals – Monday, March 9
3	6:00 pm	#7 American at #2 Boston U	44–46	PLN
4	6:00 pm	#9 Army at #1 Bucknell	61–87	PLN
5	7:00 pm	#6 Lehigh at #3 Colgate	69–52	PLN
6	7:00 pm	#5 Lafayette at #4 Holy Cross	33–52	PLN
Semifinals – Thursday, March 12
7	6:00 pm	#4 Holy Cross vs. #1 Bucknell	cancelled	PLN
8	6:00 pm	#6 Lehigh vs. #2 Boston U	cancelled	PLN
Championship – Sunday, March 15
9	cancelled	Winner of game 7 vs. Winner of game 8	N/A	CBSSN
*Game times in ET. #-Rankings denote tournament seeding. All games hosted by higher-seeded team.

== Bracket ==
First round March 7 Patriot League Network
8	Loyola (MD)	65
9	Army	72
7	American	63
10	Navy	53

Quarterfinals; March 9 Patriot League Network
1	Bucknell	87
9	Army	61
4	Holy Cross	52
5	Lafayette	33
2	BU	46
7	American	44
3	Colgate	62
6	Lehigh	69

Semifinals; March 12; Patriot League Network
1	Bucknell
4	Holy Cross
2	BU
6	Lehigh

Championship; March 15; CBS Sports Network
1/4
2/6
